= 2025 Polish presidential election =

- 18 May 2025 (first round); 1 June 2025 (second round)
- Opinion polls
- Turnout: 67.31% (first round) ▲2.80pp 71.63% (second round) ▲3.45pp
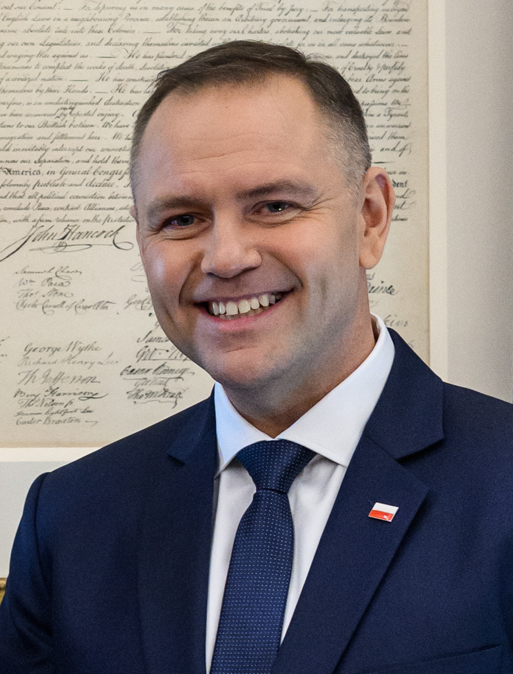

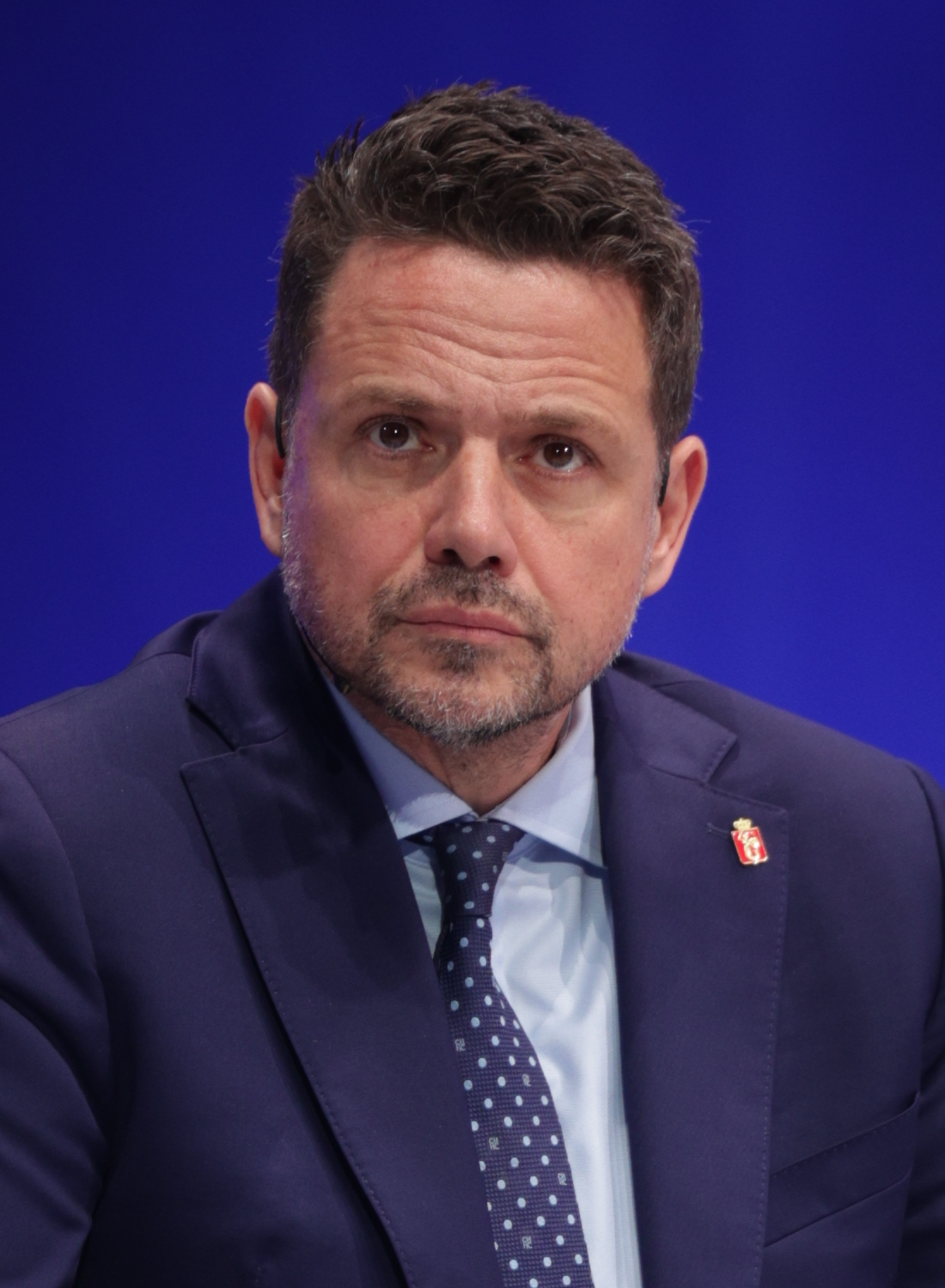
Candidate	Karol Nawrocki	Rafał Trzaskowski
Party	Independent (Note: Independent candidate supported by Law and Justice.)	PO
Popular vote	10,606,877	10,237,286
Percentage	50.89%	49.11%
President before election
Andrzej Duda
Independent (Note: The President of Poland traditionally resigns from party membership after taking office. Although Duda was officially an independent, his 2020 campaign was endorsed and funded by Law and Justice.)
Elected President
Karol Nawrocki
Independent (Note: Independent candidate supported and backed by Law and Justice.)

Presidential elections were held in Poland on 18 May 2025. As no candidate received a majority of the vote, a second round was held on 1 June 2025. Incumbent president Andrzej Duda was ineligible for re-election to a third term. The second round was won by conservative Institute of National Remembrance director Karol Nawrocki, with 50.89% of the vote, who was backed by the Law and Justice (PiS) party. Nawrocki defeated the progressive-liberal Mayor of Warsaw, Rafał Trzaskowski, who received 49.11% of the vote, nominated for the second time by the Civic Coalition (KO). It was the third consecutive victory for a candidate supported by Law and Justice in the presidential elections.

In the first round, Trzaskowski narrowly came first with 31.4% of the vote, while the right-wing and far-right candidates, Nawrocki, Sławomir Mentzen (Confederation) and Grzegorz Braun (KKP) overperformed polls, winning 29.5%, 14.8% and 6.3% respectively, coming in second, third and fourth. Other candidates of the ruling coalition underperformed and fell below expectations; the centre-right candidate Szymon Hołownia (PL2050) received 4.99% of the vote while the left-wing candidates together secured 10.2%, with coalition candidate Magdalena Biejat (The Left) coming below opposition Adrian Zandberg (Razem).

Nawrocki ran on a nationalist and socially conservative platform, focusing his campaign against the incumbent government. Nawrocki's platform called for significant government intervention in the economy, close ties between the Catholic Church and the Polish government, opposition to the European Green Deal and economic regulations, the maintenance of Poland's restrictive abortion laws, also being in opposition to legalization of same-sex marriage or civil unions. Trzaskowski supported moderate economic liberalization, social liberalism, ecological regulations, European integration, the broad legalization of abortion, the introduction of same-sex civil unions, and a greater role for the local governments of voivodeships. They also differed on their foreign policy approach, with Trzaskowski supporting the further strengthening of relations with the European Union and approving Ukraine's membership in NATO, and Nawrocki opposing Ukraine's accession to NATO and being against the strengthening of relations with the EU, instead supporting stronger cooperation with the United States. Both, however, supported continuing military support to Ukraine.

Observers noted that a victory for Nawrocki would hurt Donald Tusk's government due the governing coalition not having votes in the Sejm to overrule a presidential veto. The election result continued the trend of tighter electoral margins over the last 25 years, becoming the closest in Polish history, and the streak of Law and Justice aligned presidential candidates winning presidential elections, losing only one out of five since its founding in 2001. The first-round results indicated a notable shift in political momentum for anti-establishment parties, with the Confederation Liberty and Independence (Mentzen), Confederation of the Polish Crown (Braun) and Razem (Zandberg) having their best results in history. Exit polls indicated that both candidates won nearly 50% of each age demographic, a change from older voters voting for the Law and Justice candidate and younger voters voting for Trzaskowski in the prior election. Anti-establishment parties gained most of the youth vote; the far-right Sławomir Mentzen performed best among the youngest generation of Polish voters, with left-wing Adrian Zandberg coming second. The election saw the largest number of candidates since the 1995 presidential election, with 13 candidates running for president.

== Electoral system ==
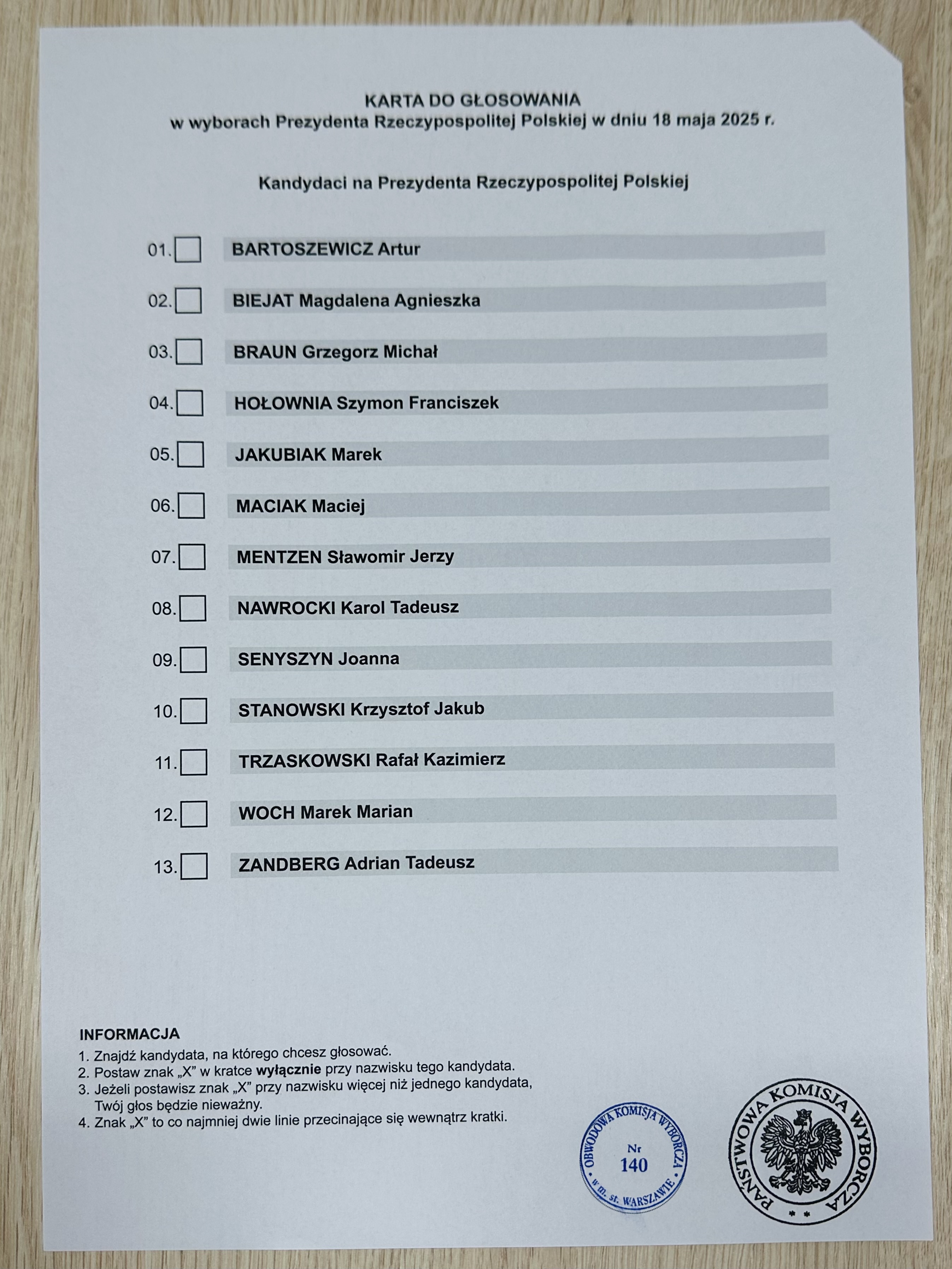
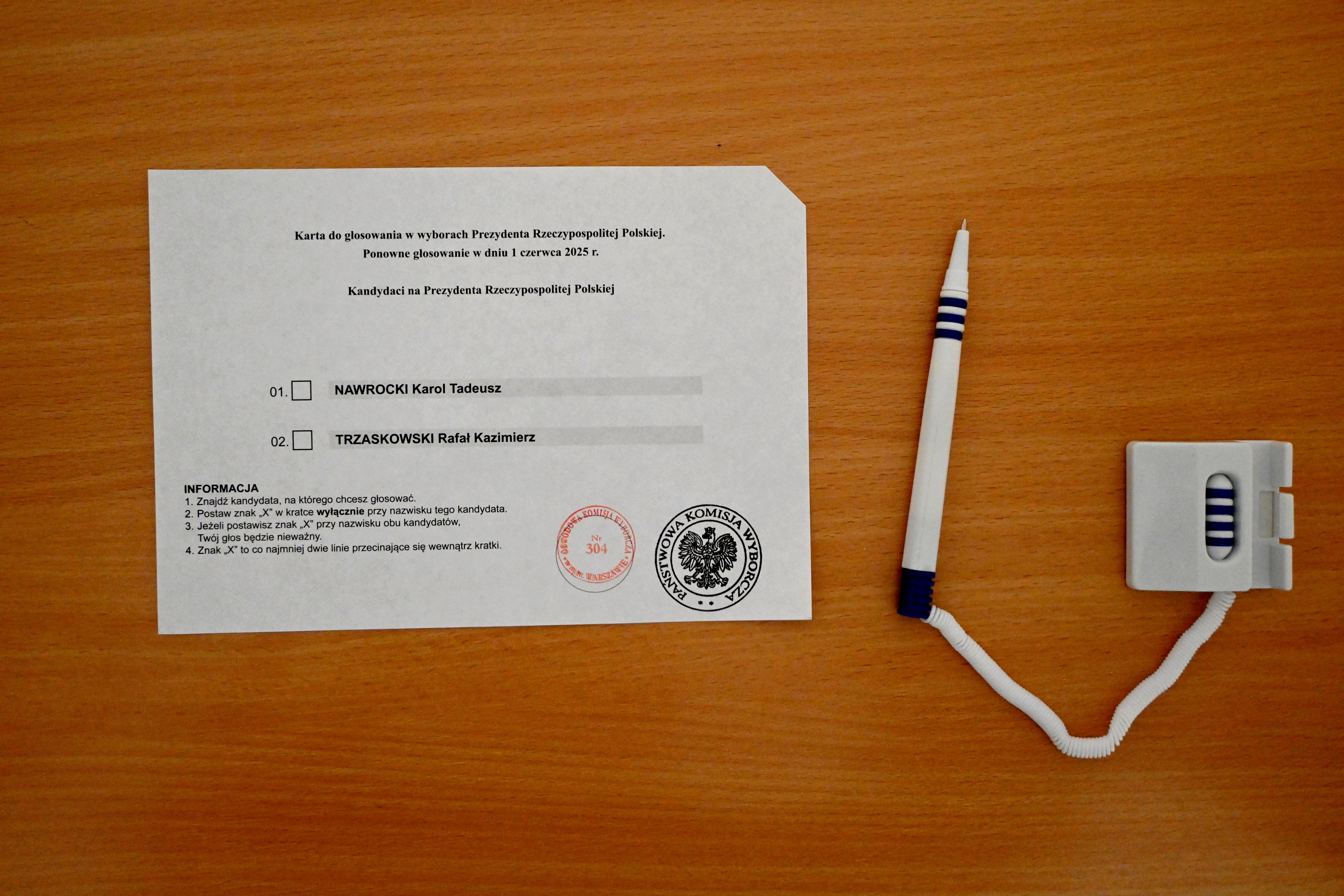
Voting ballots in the first (left) and second (right) rounds of the election.

Presidential elections in Poland must be held on a day off work (Sunday or public holiday), between 75 and 100 days before the end of the term of the sitting president. However, they may be held earlier if the office becomes vacant due to the death, resignation, or removal of the incumbent. The Marshal of the Sejm is responsible for setting the date of presidential elections and in this case had three possible dates to choose from: 4 May, 11 May, or 18 May 2025.

The President of Poland is elected using the two-round system; if no candidate receives a majority of the vote in the first round, a run-off is held between the top two candidates. Presidents serve a five-year term and can be re-elected once. Presidential terms expire on 6 August, and the president-elect takes the oath of office on the same day before the National Assembly (a joint session of the Sejm and the Senate).

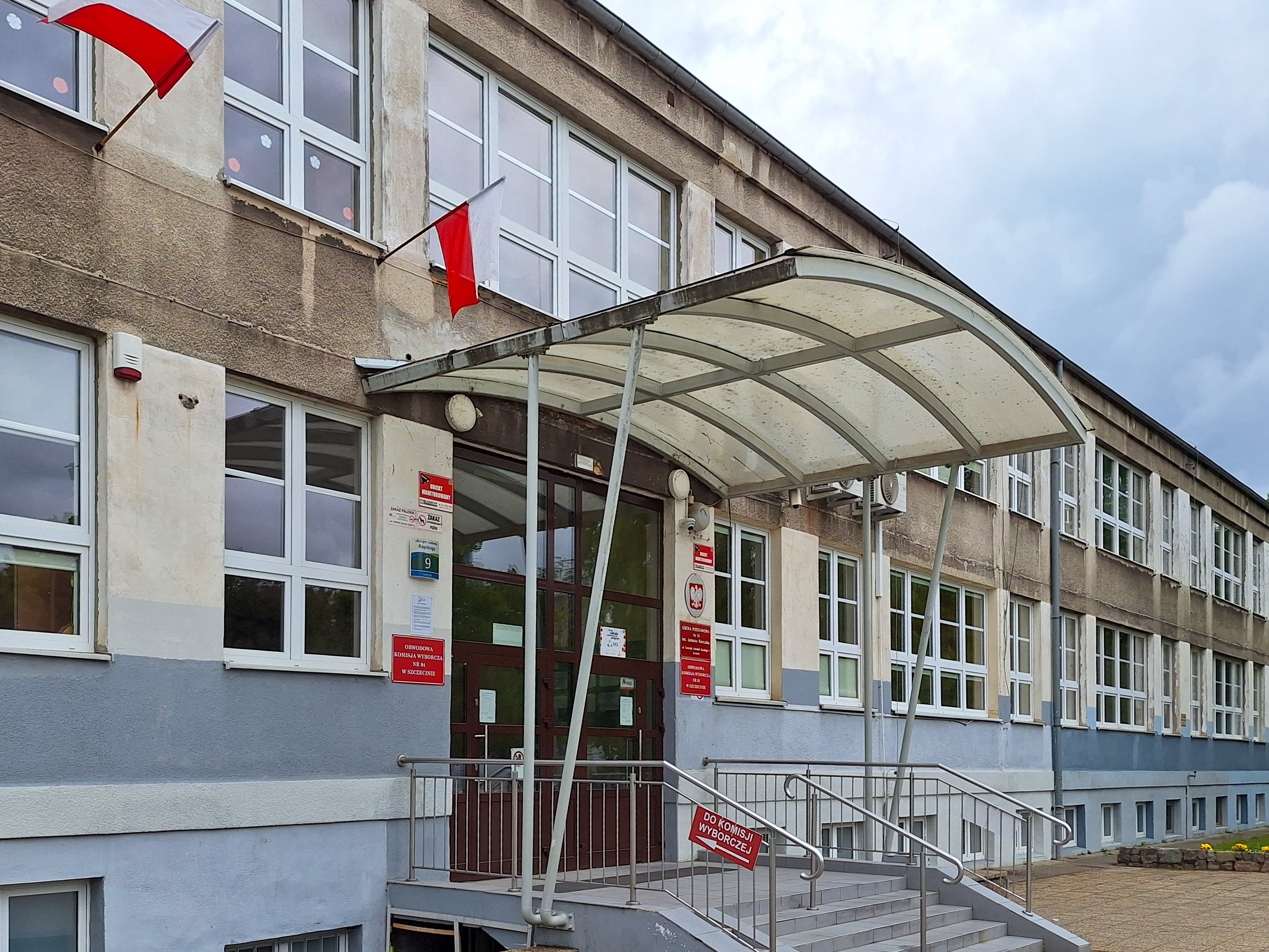
A district electoral commission in Szczecin

In order to be registered to contest the election, a candidate must be a Polish citizen, be at least 35 years old on the day of the first round of the election, and have collected at least 100,000 voters' signatures by 4 April 2025 at 16:00 (CEST). In 2025, 13 candidates registered, the highest amount of candidates tied with 1995.

All citizens are eligible to vote following their 18th birthday, except for those that have been disenfranchised, stripped of public rights, or are detained. Voters cast votes in their regional district electoral commissions (plural Polish: okręgowe komisje wyborcze), but can also vote abroad, outside of their assigned district electoral commission, or by correspondence if they have notified the electoral commission beforehand. Voting takes place for 14 hours, between 7:00 and 21:00 (CEST).

The elections are managed by the National Electoral Commission (Polish: Państwowa Komisja Wyborcza), which, for this election, was composed of the chairman (Sylwester Marciniak), deputy chairman (Wojciech Sych) and seven members recommended by groups in the Sejm — two by Civic Coalition, two by Law and Justice, and one respectively by Poland 2050, the Polish People's Party, and The Left.

The National Electoral Commission, in press conferences throughout election day, reports turnout for 12:00, 17:00 (CEST) and the final turnout. For the day preceding, and day of, the election, until polls close at 21:00, election silence is in place. In the second round of the presidential election, there were 87 incidents of electoral silence being broken.

== Background ==
=== Duda's second inauguration ===
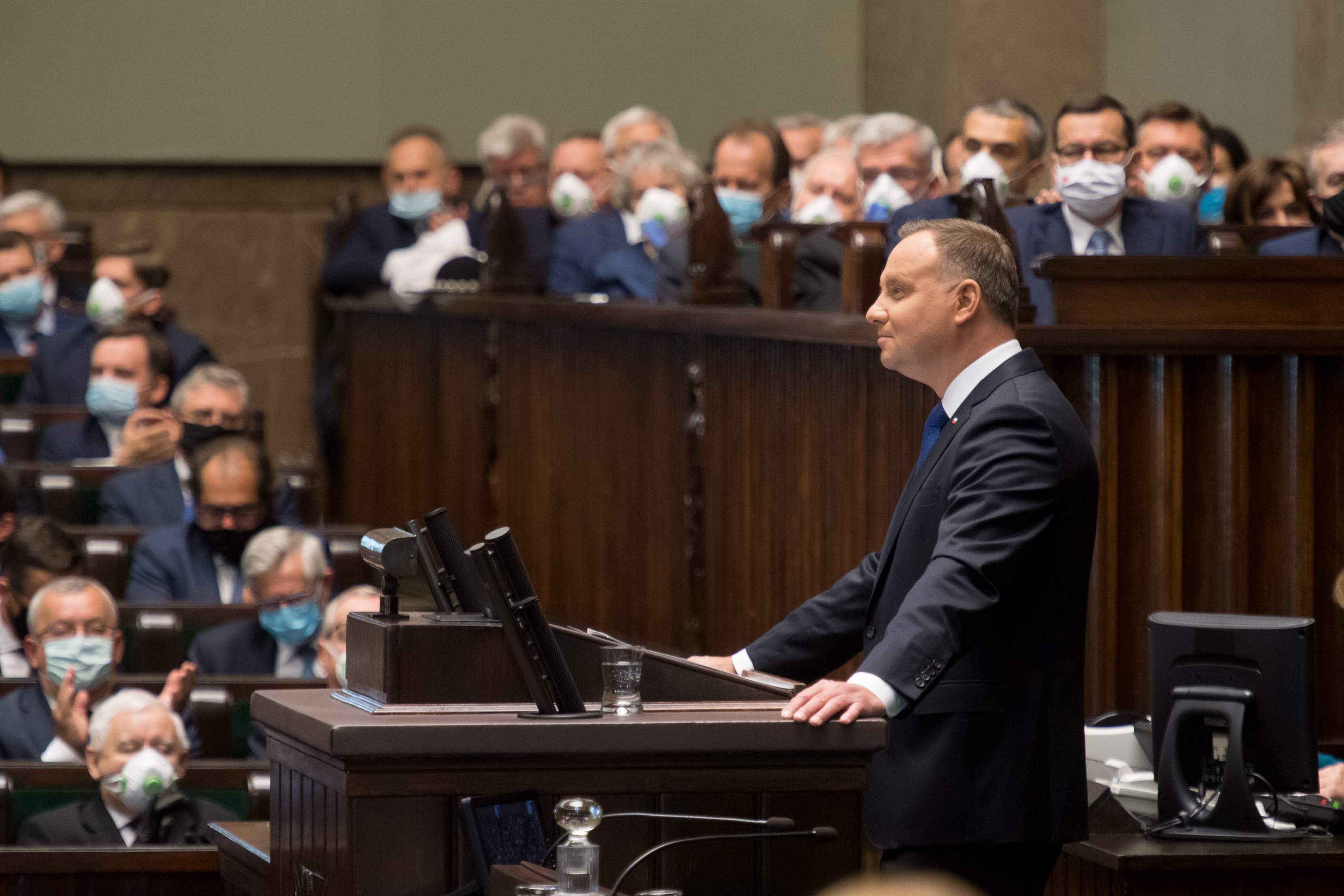
Andrzej Duda being sworn in for his second term on 6 August 2020

Incumbent President Andrzej Duda (PiS) narrowly defeated Rafał Trzaskowski (PO) in the 2020 presidential election and was sworn in for his second term on 6 August 2020. Duda would govern along with Prime Minister Mateusz Morawiecki and his cabinet until the 2023 parliamentary election. The parliamentary election saw record-high turnout, with 74.4% of eligible Poles casting their vote, an increase of 12.6 percentage points since 2019.

=== Tusk's cabinet ===
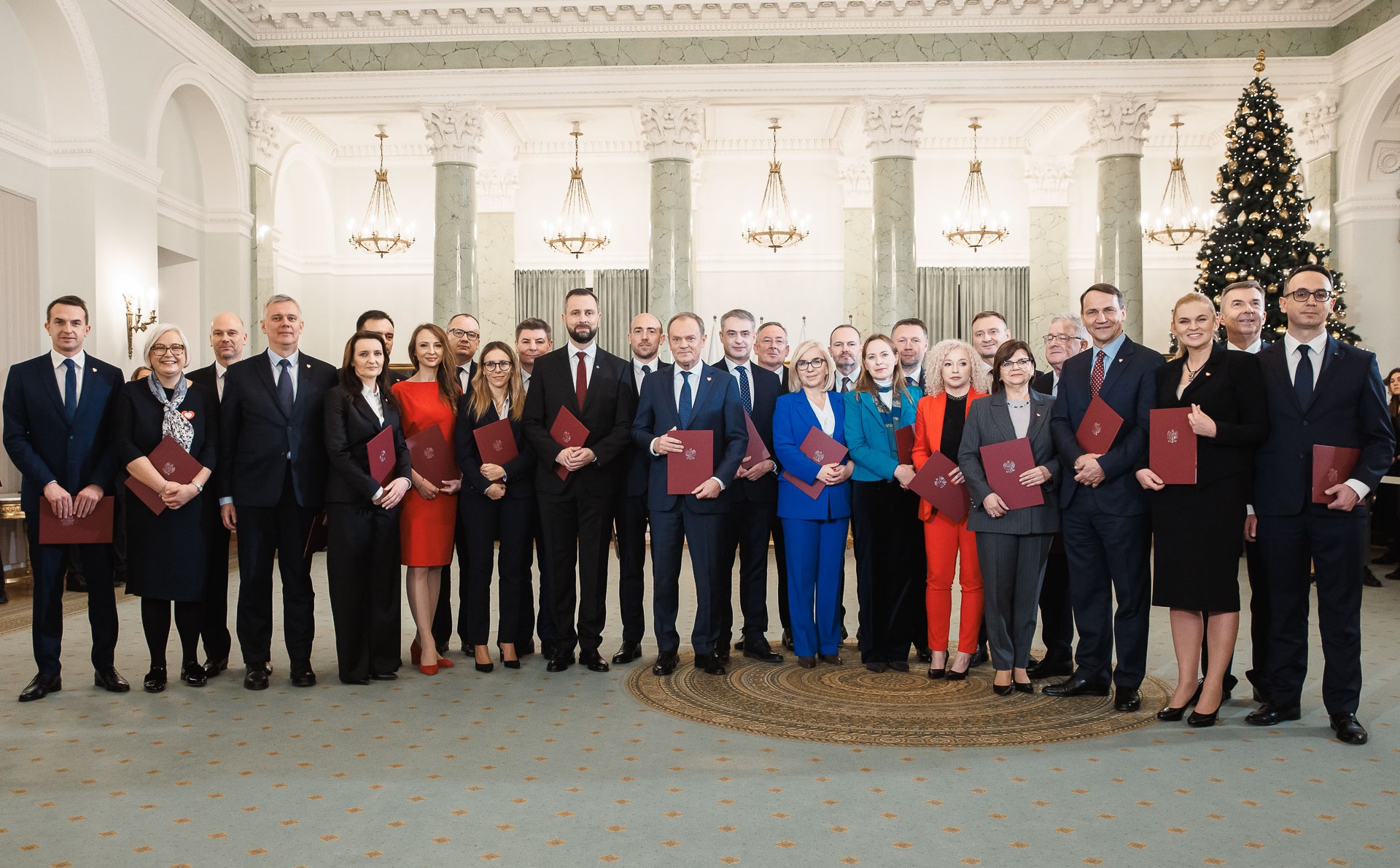
Third Cabinet of Donald Tusk

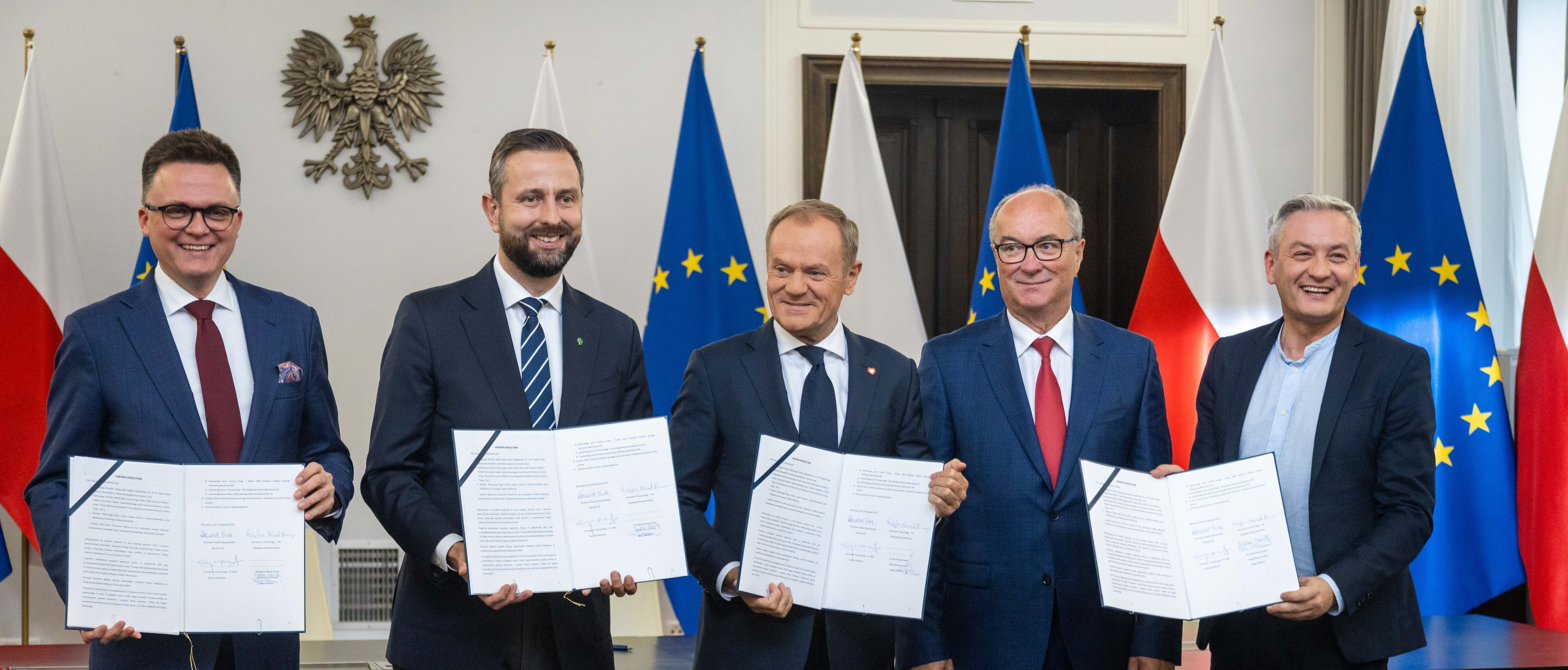
Leaders of coalition parties signing the coalition agreement, left to right: Szymon Hołownia (PL2050-TD), Władysław Kosiniak-Kamysz (PSL-TD), Donald Tusk (KO), Włodzimierz Czarzasty (NL) and Robert Biedroń (NL). In the presidential election, the TD alliance fielded Szymon Hołownia, KO fielded Rafał Trzaskowski, and NL fielded Magdalena Biejat.

Following the 2023 parliamentary election and installment of the short-lived renomination of Mateusz Morawiecki, Donald Tusk's cabinet, comprising Civic Coalition, Poland 2050, the Polish People's Party, and the New Left, began governing the country. Tusk's coalition did not have enough votes to bypass the presidential veto, for which it would need 276 votes.

==== Tusk cabinet economic policy ====
Since the coalition's rise to power, Tusk's cabinet had pledged to deregulate the economy and balance the budget. In February 2025, Tusk invited billionaire Rafał Brzoska and Google CEO Sundar Pichai to deregulate the Polish economy and cut labor regulations. Tusk's proposal of Brzoska has led to media labelling him as the "Polish Elon Musk", but Brzoska later abandoned the project, citing poor cooperation. Tusk has been accused of granting Google a monopoly over the Artificial Intelligence sector in Poland via his investment agreements with Pichai. In May, Tusk also promised more than one hundred laws that would help deregulate the Polish economy, but they were scrapped.

==== Tusk cabinet social policy ====
The ruling coalition was composed of mostly centrist or slightly right leaning parties. However, the New Left also being part of the cabinet, postulated decriminalization of abortion and progressive LGBT+-policies. The Sejm rejected the proposal in July 2024. Facing opposition within the ruling coalition of a large group of dissidents from the Polish People's Party, the vote failed with 218 votes against and 215 for decriminalization.

==== Tusk cabinet healthcare policy ====
On 4 April, the Sejm narrowly voted (213–190, with KO, PL2050 and PSL voting for – PiS, NL and Razem against – and Konfederacja mainly abstaining) to decrease the health insurance contribution (Polish: składka zdrowotna) for entrepreneurs, which sparked protests from the left, especially members of Razem, accusing the government of attempting to undermine and then privatize public healthcare. Ultimately, Andrzej Duda vetoed the health contribution decrease on 6 May.

== Candidate selection ==
=== Registered candidates ===
Name	Born	Campaign	Last position/job	Party	Endorsed by
Artur Bartoszewicz	18 January 1974 (52); Suwałki, Podlaskie		Lecturer at the Collegium of Socio-Economics of the Warsaw School of Economics	Independent	Social Interest
Magdalena Biejat	11 January 1982 (44); Warsaw, Mazovia		Deputy Marshal of the Senate (2023–present); Member of the Sejm (2019–2023); Senator (2023–present)	Independent	The Left: Common Tomorrow; New Left; Polish Socialist Party; Labour Union
Grzegorz Braun	11 March 1967 (59); Toruń, Kuyavia–Pomerania		Leader of the Confederation of the Polish Crown (2019–present); Member of the Sejm (2019–2024); MEP for Lesser Poland (2024–present); 2015 presidential election candidate	Confederation of the Polish Crown	Congress of the New Right
Grzegorz Braun	11 March 1967 (59); Toruń, Kuyavia–Pomerania		Leader of the Confederation of the Polish Crown (2019–present); Member of the Sejm (2019–2024); MEP for Lesser Poland (2024–present); 2015 presidential election candidate	Confederation of the Polish Crown	KORWiN
Grzegorz Braun	11 March 1967 (59); Toruń, Kuyavia–Pomerania		Leader of the Confederation of the Polish Crown (2019–present); Member of the Sejm (2019–2024); MEP for Lesser Poland (2024–present); 2015 presidential election candidate	Confederation of the Polish Crown	National Revival of Poland
Grzegorz Braun	11 March 1967 (59); Toruń, Kuyavia–Pomerania		Leader of the Confederation of the Polish Crown (2019–present); Member of the Sejm (2019–2024); MEP for Lesser Poland (2024–present); 2015 presidential election candidate	Confederation of the Polish Crown	PolExit
Grzegorz Braun	11 March 1967 (59); Toruń, Kuyavia–Pomerania		Leader of the Confederation of the Polish Crown (2019–present); Member of the Sejm (2019–2024); MEP for Lesser Poland (2024–present); 2015 presidential election candidate	Confederation of the Polish Crown	Real Europe Movement
Szymon Hołownia	3 September 1976 (50); Białystok, Podlaskie		Marshal of the Sejm (2023–present); Member of the Sejm (2023–present); Leader of Poland 2050 (2021–present); 2020 presidential election candidate	Poland 2050	Third Way: Poland 2050; Polish People's Party; Centre for Poland
Marek Jakubiak	30 April 1959 (67); Warsaw, Mazovia		Leader of Federation for the Republic (2018–present); Member of the Sejm (2015–2019, 2023–present); 2020 presidential election candidate Brewer	Federation for the Republic	Free Republicans: Federation for the Republic; Kukiz'15; Freedom and Prosperity
Maciej Maciak	30 August 1970 (56); Włocławek, Kuyavia-Pomerania		Leader of RDiP (2023–present); Journalist, YouTuber	Independent	Prosperity and Peace Movement
Sławomir Mentzen	20 November 1986 (39); Toruń, Kuyavia–Pomerania		Chairman of New Hope (2022–present); Member of the Sejm (2023–present); Tax advisor	New Hope	Confederation: New Hope; National Movement
Karol Nawrocki	3 March 1983 (43); Gdańsk, Pomerania		President of the Institute of National Remembrance (2021–present); Director of the Museum of the Second World War (2017–2021); Chairman of the Siedlce District Council in Gdańsk (2011–2017)	Independent	United Right: Law and Justice; Renewal of the Republic of Poland
Karol Nawrocki	3 March 1983 (43); Gdańsk, Pomerania		President of the Institute of National Remembrance (2021–present); Director of the Museum of the Second World War (2017–2021); Chairman of the Siedlce District Council in Gdańsk (2011–2017)	Independent	Self-Defence of the Republic of Poland
Karol Nawrocki	3 March 1983 (43); Gdańsk, Pomerania		President of the Institute of National Remembrance (2021–present); Director of the Museum of the Second World War (2017–2021); Chairman of the Siedlce District Council in Gdańsk (2011–2017)	Independent	United Beyond Boundaries
Joanna Senyszyn	1 February 1949 (77); Gdynia, Pomerania		Member of the Sejm (2001–2009, 2019–2023); MEP for Lesser Poland (2009–2014); Journalist	Independent	Democratic Left Association
Joanna Senyszyn	1 February 1949 (77); Gdynia, Pomerania		Member of the Sejm (2001–2009, 2019–2023); MEP for Lesser Poland (2009–2014); Journalist	Independent	Nonpartisians
Krzysztof Stanowski	21 July 1982 (44); Warsaw, Mazovia		Journalist, YouTuber; Kanał Zero and KTS Weszło owner	Independent	
Rafał Trzaskowski	17 January 1972 (54); Warsaw, Mazovia		Mayor of Warsaw (2018–present); Vice-chairman of the Civic Platform (2020–present); 2020 presidential election second round	Civic Platform	Civic Coalition: Civic Platform; Modern; Polish Initiative; The Greens
Rafał Trzaskowski	17 January 1972 (54); Warsaw, Mazovia		Mayor of Warsaw (2018–present); Vice-chairman of the Civic Platform (2020–present); 2020 presidential election second round	Civic Platform	Social Democracy of Poland
Rafał Trzaskowski	17 January 1972 (54); Warsaw, Mazovia		Mayor of Warsaw (2018–present); Vice-chairman of the Civic Platform (2020–present); 2020 presidential election second round	Civic Platform	Alliance of Democrats
Rafał Trzaskowski	17 January 1972 (54); Warsaw, Mazovia		Mayor of Warsaw (2018–present); Vice-chairman of the Civic Platform (2020–present); 2020 presidential election second round	Civic Platform	Union of European Democrats
Rafał Trzaskowski	17 January 1972 (54); Warsaw, Mazovia		Mayor of Warsaw (2018–present); Vice-chairman of the Civic Platform (2020–present); 2020 presidential election second round	Civic Platform	Yes! For Poland
Marek Woch	17 December 1978 (47); Kąkolewnica, Lublin		Leader of the Bezpartyjni Samorządowcy (2024–present)	Bezpartyjni Samorządowcy (Note: Denounced by Lower Silesian branch of the party)	Social Alternative
Marek Woch	17 December 1978 (47); Kąkolewnica, Lublin		Leader of the Bezpartyjni Samorządowcy (2024–present)	Bezpartyjni Samorządowcy	Labour Party
Marek Woch	17 December 1978 (47); Kąkolewnica, Lublin		Leader of the Bezpartyjni Samorządowcy (2024–present)	Bezpartyjni Samorządowcy	Slavic Union
Adrian Zandberg	4 December 1979 (46); Aalborg, Denmark		Co-leader of Partia Razem (2022–present); Member of the Sejm (2019–present)	Partia Razem	

=== Law and Justice ===
Potential candidates
Karol Nawrocki	Tobiasz Bocheński	Przemysław Czarnek
Director of the Institute of National Remembrance (2021-2025)	Member of the European Parliament (2024-present)	Minister of Education and Science (2020-2023)

Because of the centralized nature of the party, the choice for selecting who the party's candidate would be fell primarily to the party chairman, Jarosław Kaczyński, based on social research and the balance of factional power within the party. Preceding the election, speculative candidates included PiS parliamentary leader Mariusz Błaszczak, MEP Tobiasz Bocheński, poseł Zbigniew Bogucki, former Minister Przemysław Czarnek, MEP Patryk Jaki, former Prime Minister Mateusz Morawiecki, poseł Arkadiusz Mularczyk, IPN director Karol Nawrocki, poseł Kacper Płażyński, former Deputy Minister Tomasz Szatkowski and MEP Dominik Tarczyński, among others. President of the World Anti-Doping Agency, Witold Bańka, was also considered Kaczyński's favoured candidate, but he refused to run in the election.

In an August Radio Maryja interview, Kaczyński stated that the selection of possible candidates was narrowing, and described that the PiS candidate must be a "young, tall, imposing, handsome" male "[with] a family". A United Surveys poll in September 2024 suggested 29% of PiS voters supported Błaszczak, 21% supported Morawiecki, 11% supported Czarnek, 7% supported Nawrocki, 6% supported Bocheński and 6% supported Tarczyński. The possibility of a primary election for the party was rumored, but ultimately, never announced.

By November 2024, media speculation regarding the candidates narrowed down to, most frequently, Bocheński, Czarnek and Nawrocki. According to Newsweek, Nawrocki was supported internally by party activists such as Adam Bielan, Joachim Brudziński, Sławomir Cenckiewicz, Marta Kaczyńska, and Mateusz Morawiecki (despite initially desiring to himself be the candidate).

Ultimately, the party selected nonpartisan Karol Nawrocki as its candidate on 22 November, and declared his candidacy publicly on 24 November.

=== Civic Coalition ===
Potential candidates
Rafał Trzaskowski	Radosław Sikorski
Mayor of Warsaw (2018-present)	Minister of Foreign Affairs (2007-2014, 2023-present)

Unlike the other parties, the Civic Platform historically held primary elections to select a candidate for the 2010 and 2020 presidential elections. In the lead-up to the election, the Mayor of Warsaw, Rafał Trzaskowski, was considered the presumptive nominee of the Civic Coalition for the presidential election, running for the second time after his loss in the previous election. Minister of Foreign Affairs Radosław Sikorski, who previously also attempted to become the Civic Platform's candidate for the 2010 Polish presidential election and 2020 presidential elections, pursued the Coalition's nomination for a third time. With Trzaskowski's presumptive nominee status challenged by Sikorski, the Civic Coalition on 9 November announced it will be holding a presidential primary within the party to decide who will be the coalition's candidate in the election.

Trzaskowski's most prominent backers were Dorota Łoboda, Sławomir Nitras, Barbara Nowacka, Agnieszka Pomaska, Adam Szłapka and Cezary Tomczyk. Trzaskowski was considered the candidate who could appeal to left-leaning voters. He was the favorite across the race, consistently overperforming Sikorski in opinion polls.

Sikorski was endorsed by Roman Giertych, Marta Golbik, Joanna Kluzik-Rostkowska, Gabriela Morawska-Stanecka, Arkadiusz Myrcha and Bogdan Zdrojewski. His campaign was focused on being more experienced to handle the increasingly tense international situation of Poland, and the assumption that he could gain more votes from centrist and conservative electorates in the second round, with opposition voters preferring him, in contrast to coalition voters preferring Trzaskowski. Sikorski, from the position of the underdog, campaigned aggressively, utilizing a powerful social media campaign, manifesting in him winning Donald Tusk's Twitter poll with 64.7% against Trzaskowski's 35.3%.

Other topics in the campaign also included the 2024 United States presidential election, and the Jewish ancestry of Sikorski's wife, Anne Applebaum, which Sikorski commented as unacceptable discourse.

On 22 November, the primary election took place, after which Trzaskowski was declared the winner the following day, with 75% of the votes, against Sikorski's 25%.

=== Confederation Liberty and Independence and Confederation of the Polish Crown ===
Initially, the Confederation alliance planned to hold another set of primary elections in autumn, like it had done five years prior, with both National Movement leader Krzysztof Bosak, and New Hope leader Sławomir Mentzen declaring their participation, with Confederation of the Polish Crown leader Grzegorz Braun being considered a possible candidate. Przemysław Wipler of New Hope ruled out the possibility of his faction allowing for Braun or any other politician to contesting the alliance's primary.

On 13 August, Bosak stated that he would only contest a hypothetical presidential primary election for all right-wing parties, and in the event of such not being organized, endorsed Mentzen, stating that holding a primary election for the alliance alone would not advance their cause. Grzegorz Braun announced his disapproval for the possibility of the alliance not holding a primary, appealing for the candidate selection process to be open and procedural, instead of agreed in backroom deals.

Regardless, on 20 August, Confederation announced that Mentzen would be its candidate in the election without a primary. In opposition to this, Braun, who had been increasingly marginalized in the Confederation since the departure of Janusz Korwin-Mikke from New Hope leadership, declared a separate candidacy on 16 January, leaving the Confederation alliance.

=== Third Way ===
Marshal of the Sejm Szymon Hołownia was the presumptive nominee, announcing his candidacy on 13 November. He was endorsed by the Polish People's Party and the Centre for Poland on 14 December, making it the first time that since 1990 that the Polish People's Party did not field a presidential candidate. Despite being a part of the Third Way alliance, the Union of European Democrats chose to endorse Rafał Trzaskowski instead.

=== The Left ===
The Left was splintered among its constituent parties. The New Left considered several candidates for President: Vicemarshal of the Senate Magdalena Biejat, Minister Agnieszka Dziemianowicz-Bąk, Deputy Prime Minister Krzysztof Gawkowski, Minister Katarzyna Kotula, Mayor of Włocławek Krzysztof Kukucki and poseł Łukasz Litewka. An important matter for some in the party was to present a female candidate. Rzeczpospolita claims, however, that the party most strongly debated between Biejat and Kukucki. On 15 December, the party officially endorsed Magdalena Biejat, a nonpartisan who recently seceded from Razem.

Another party in the Left, Razem, dissatisfied with the governing coalition, held a non-binding referendum to leave the Left alliance and join the parliamentary opposition on 11–12 October, with results indicating 70% of participants supporting leaving. As a result, it established its own parliamentary group, but suffered a split, with the pro-government faction that included Magdalena Biejat aligning with the New Left. On 11 January, Adrian Zandberg, Razem's leader, announced his start in the presidential election.

Former Democratic Left Alliance poseł Joanna Senyszyn declared her start in the election on 20 January, successfully registering and contesting them.

Labour Union leader Waldemar Witkowski also declared he would partake in the elections, but ended up endorsing Biejat instead.

=== Alternate proposals ===
Speculative candidates included military personnel, including general Rajmund Andrzejczak and Head of the National Security Bureau Jacek Siewiera, or journalist Dorota Gawryluk. None of them ran.

Throughout the candidate selection process, media presented the possibility of the ruling coalition running a single candidate. Polls showed Trzaskowski as the most popular choice for a coalition candidate. The idea of a coalition candidate was supported by the leader of the Polish People's Party, Władysław Kosiniak-Kamysz, but demeaned by other coalition leaders.

=== Withdrawn ===
- Stanisław Żółtek – MEP for Lesser Poland and Świętokrzyskie (2014–2019), leader of the Congress of the New Right and PolExit; withdrew to endorse Grzegorz Braun
- Krzysztof Andrzej Sitko – withdrew to endorse Marek Woch
- Katarzyna Cichos – withdrew to endorse Marek Woch

=== Candidate registration ===
A group of citizens seeking to register a candidate in the election was required to establish an electoral committee (Polish: komitet wyborczy) consisting of at least 15 members and submit a notice to the National Electoral Commission, supported with 1,000 citizens' signatures, no later than 24 March 2025. To register a candidate, an electoral committee had to submit an additional 99,000 endorsement signatures to the PKW by 4 April 2025, the final date for candidate registration. The PKW verified the lists of signatures as they were submitted. The following committees and candidates applied for registration:

Electoral committees
	Candidate	Status	Date
1	Sławomir Mentzen (KWiN)	Candidate registered	3 February
2	Rafał Trzaskowski (KO)	Candidate registered	17 March
3	Grzegorz Braun (KKP)	Candidate registered	10 March
4	Szymon Hołownia (TD)	Candidate registered	24 March
5	Adrian Zandberg (Razem)	Candidate registered	24 March
6	Wiesław Lewicki (NK)	Candidacy rejected	9 April
7	Maciej Maciak (RDiP)	Candidate registered	9 April
8	Magdalena Biejat (Lewica)	Candidate registered	31 March
9	Marek Woch (BS)	Candidate registered	31 March
10	Marek Jakubiak (K’15)	Candidate registered	4 April
11	Karol Nawrocki (PiS)	Candidate registered	21 March
12	Wojciech Papis (B)	Notice accepted	
13	Romuald Starosielec (RNP)	Candidacy rejected	11 April
14	Paweł Tanajno (PL!SP)	Candidacy rejected	11 April
15	Dawid Jackiewicz (ind.)	Candidacy rejected	9 April
16	Aldona Skirgiełło (SRP)	Notice accepted	
17	Dominika Jasińska (ind.)	Notice accepted	
18	Joanna Senyszyn (SLD)	Candidate registered	31 March
19	Krzysztof Tołwiński (FRONT)	Notice accepted	
20	Eugeniusz Maciejewski (PIAST-JMENiŚ)	Notice accepted	
21	Katarzyna Cichos (ind.)	Notice accepted / withdrew (Note: Withdrew to endorse Marek Woch.)	8 March
22	Piotr Szumlewicz (ind.)	Notice accepted	
23	Jan Kubań (ind.)	Notice accepted	
24	Włodzimierz Rynkowski (ZS)	Notice accepted	
25	Marcin Bugajski (ind.)	Notice accepted	
26	Jolanta Duda (ind.)	Notice accepted	
27	Artur Bartoszewicz (ind.)	Candidate registered	17 March
28	Kamil Całek (ind.)	Notice accepted	
29	Krzysztof Andrzej Sitko (AS)	Notice accepted / withdrew (Note: Withdrew to endorse Marek Woch.)	29 March
30	Jakub Perkowski (FdR)	Notice accepted	
31	Sebastian Ross (ind.)	Notice accepted	
32	Marta Ratuszyńska (DR)	Notice accepted	
33	Stanisław Żółtek (KNP)	Notice accepted / withdrew (Note: Withdrew to endorse Grzegorz Braun.)	20 March
34	Krzysztof Stanowski (ind.)	Candidate registered	11 April
35	Robert Śledź (PIN)	Notice accepted	
36	Adam Nawara (PL!SP)	Notice accepted	
37	Grzegorz Kołek (ind.)	Notice accepted	
38	Tomasz Ziółkowski (ind.)	Notice accepted	
39	Roman Jackowski (ind.)	Notice accepted	
40	Piotr Daniel Lechowicz (KWiN)	Notice accepted	
41	Robert Więcko (ind.)	Notice accepted	
42	Zbigniew Litke (ind.)	Notice accepted	
43	Grzegorz Niedźwiecki (ind.)	Notice rejected	
44	Maria Leśniak-Wojciechowska (RNP)	Notice rejected	
45	Katarzyna Łysik (ind.)	Notice accepted	
46	Dariusz Eligiusz Staszczak (ind.)	Notice rejected	
47	Artur Szostak (P3)	Notice rejected	
48	Andrzej Jan Kasela (ind.)	Notice accepted	
49	Krzysztof Kaszewiak (ind.)	Notice rejected	
50	Zbnigniew Józef Burzyński (WiS)	Notice rejected	
51	Mieczysław Eugeniusz Sendecki (ZS)	Notice rejected	
52	Sławomir Grzywa (SS)	Notice rejected	
53	Krzysztof Olaf Samberger (ind.)	Notice rejected	

== Campaign issues ==
=== Campaign themes ===
==== Nawrocki's campaign ====
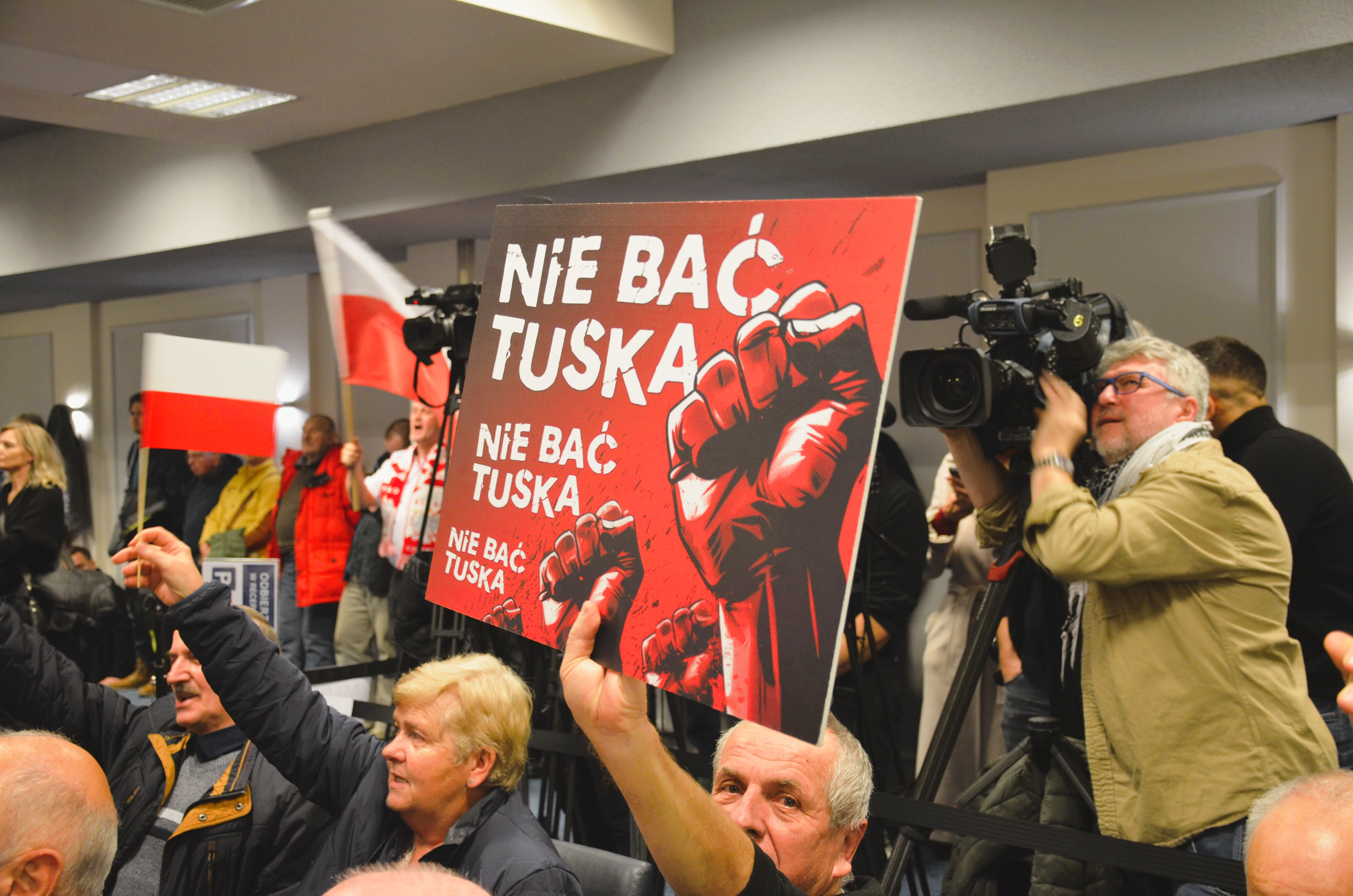
Anti-Tusk "NIE BAĆ TUSKA" sign at a Nawrocki meeting in Bielsko-Biała

Karol Nawrocki pitted his campaign against the unpopular (Note: The government and Prime Minister have received net negative approval between January and May 2025, both situated within -2 to -20 net approval.) government and Prime Minister, declaring the election as a referendum on the Tusk cabinet, and attacking Trzaskowski for being the vice-chairman of the ruling Civic Platform. He portrayed himself as a nonpartisan "citizens' candidate" (Polish: kandydat obywatelski) supported by Law and Justice, as he was never a member of any political party, and as an authentic "flesh and bone man" (Polish: człowiek z krwi i kości), contrasting with Trzaskowski by calling him the product of a political laboratory. Nawrocki's campaign was oriented around the welfare of citizens, national security and infrastructural development.

==== Trzaskowski's campaign ====
Rafał Trzaskowski defended the incumbent coalition government, blaming its inaction on the presidential veto of incumbent president Andrzej Duda. He portrayed himself as a competent and educated candidate, highlighting his knowledge of foreign languages, education and political experience, promising to be independent of party decisionmaking. He challenged Nawrocki's nonpartisan presentation, attacking him as the "decision of the [PiS] party chairman".

==== Mentzen's campaign ====
Sławomir Mentzen presented himself as the anti-establishment candidate who would take on the "duopoly" of the Law and Justice and Civic Platform parties, which have dominated politics since the 2005 parliamentary election. He was the dominant candidate in social media and among the youth. He also campaigned on polling indicating himself to have the highest chance out of all the right-wing candidates to defeat Trzaskowski in the second round of the election. He focused his campaign on economic and security issues, most prominently tax reform, immigration and military readiness for war.

==== Braun's campaign ====
Grzegorz Braun ran on the slogan "This is Poland!". Braun's campaign was also unique in making populist demands, such as the exhumation of the Jedwabne pogrom victims, releasing classified files on the dissolution of the Military Information Services, and restarting investigations into deaths of Jerzy Popiełuszko, Andrzej Lepper, Sławomir Petelicki and Marek Papała. Braun became popular for controversial stunts during his campaign; he organized protests that successfully forced the German supermarket chain Lidl to resign from building a store near the place of Marian apparitions in Gietrzwałd, winning over voters concerned with preserving Catholic tradition, economic nationalism and limiting foreign capital in Poland. Braun's campaign and rhetoric was described by critics as "hostile to democracy, full of conspiracy theories, religiously fundamentalist, and often openly anti-Semitic and anti-Ukrainian", while supporters praised his "fight for truth, authenticity", "soldier-like" dedication to the values of God, Honour, Fatherland, and challenging the submissive attitude of the Polish governments towards Ukraine, Israel and NATO. His campaign was centered on Polish nationalism, Catholic tradition and opposition to NATO and the European Union.

==== Other campaigns ====
Szymon Hołownia promised to support "local Poland", decentralize the state administration and apply referendums to resolve polarizing issues. He presented himself as a "candidate for the people", as opposed to a partisan candidate. Hołownia highlighted energy transition, housing prices, national security and children's safety from technology addiction as campaign issues.

Adrian Zandberg, a leftwing candidate, contrasted himself against former party ally Magdalena Biejat in his criticism of the ruling coalition, which he criticized as corrupt and ineffectual in resolving problems of the citizens. He presented himself as an anti-establishment candidate, fighting for votes among Mentzen's young anti-establishment base. Zandberg's campaign oriented around infrastructural development, reducing housing prices and improving Poland's healthcare system.

Magdalena Biejat, a former member of Zandberg's Razem party, criticized Zandberg for his opposition to the ruling government, highlighting the pro-government Left's accomplishments as allies of the Prime Minister. Biejat focused on issues such as housing prices, legalization of abortion and secularization.

=== Economy ===
Nawrocki's program was described as economically interventionist, or economically left-wing. Nawrocki described himself as a strong supporter of armaments and social investment programmes. Nawrocki supported large economic investments; he strongly supports the Central Communication Port (Polish: Centralny Port Komunikacyjny, CPK) project, and praised the Central Industrial Region and Stocznia Gdynia schemes developed in the interwar Second Polish Republic. Nawrocki expressed his fascination with other large investments such as the Vistula Spit canal and Świnoujście LNG terminal, wanting to pursue similar undertakings. He promised investments of new infrastructure in every gmina.

During the campaign, Trzaskowski was described as neoliberal. He opposed increasing social spending and expressed openess to austerity policies. He proposed to remove child benefits from unemployed Ukrainian refugees, endorsed Rafał Brzoska's "deregulation task force" and wanted to accelerate the process of deregulation, and pledged to sign the government's bill to cut health insurance tax for entrepreneurs.

Braun promised to oppose any budget bill "that allocates a single złoty to matters unrelated to Poles"; this included opposing welfare benefits for Ukrainian immigrants and Jewish property claims. He also demanded a reversal of "selling off Polish land and resources". He argued that Poland should generate energy from both renewable and non-renewable sources, focusing on lowering life costs instead of minimizing the environmental impact.

=== European Union and foreign policy ===
Nawrocki opposed adoption of the Euro as Poland's currency. He also opposed the European Green Deal as well as the EU–Mercosur Association Agreement and further EU economic regulations.

Hołownia opposed adoption of the Euro until Poland's economy is ready for its adoption, drawing criticism for changing his rhetoric from strong support of the currency.

Braun advocated multilateralism - he supported Polexit, supported securing mutual energy and safe border agreements with Belarus, sought to withdraw Polish aid to Ukraine, and criticized the Polish government for becoming "the servants of Ukraine". Braun also campaigned on pursuing good relations with the Russian Federation and punishing Israel for the "Israeli genocide in Gaza".

=== Housing ===
The enactment of a cadastral tax (Polish: podatek katastralny) on owners of several properties was seen as a way to remedy the increasing cost of housing within cities. A SW Research poll showed that, overall, 40% of respondents supported and 34% opposed the introduction of a cadastral tax. Another proposed solution was the construction of low-rent housing by the state.

Nawrocki's stance on the cadastral tax idea was criticized as contradictory, with him stating opposition to a cadastral tax, yet supporting taxation of properties possessed by owners of three or more houses. He promised to lower the cost of housing in the country, stating he would "fight for cheap housing".

Trzaskowski's electoral committee declared its candidate was against the introduction of a cadastral tax and in favor of state construction of housing.

Mentzen opposed cadastral taxes and was against state construction of low-rent housing.

=== Social issues ===
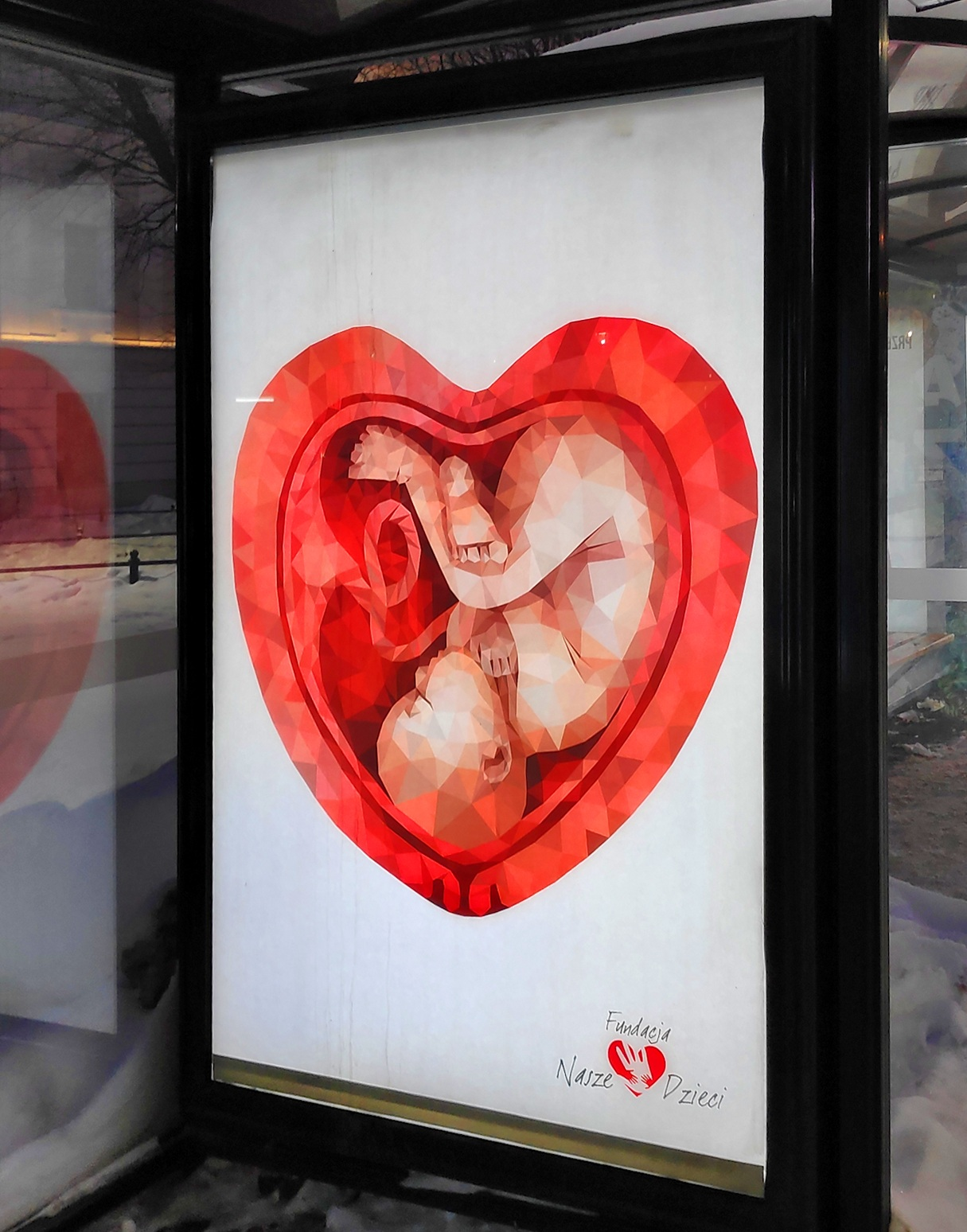
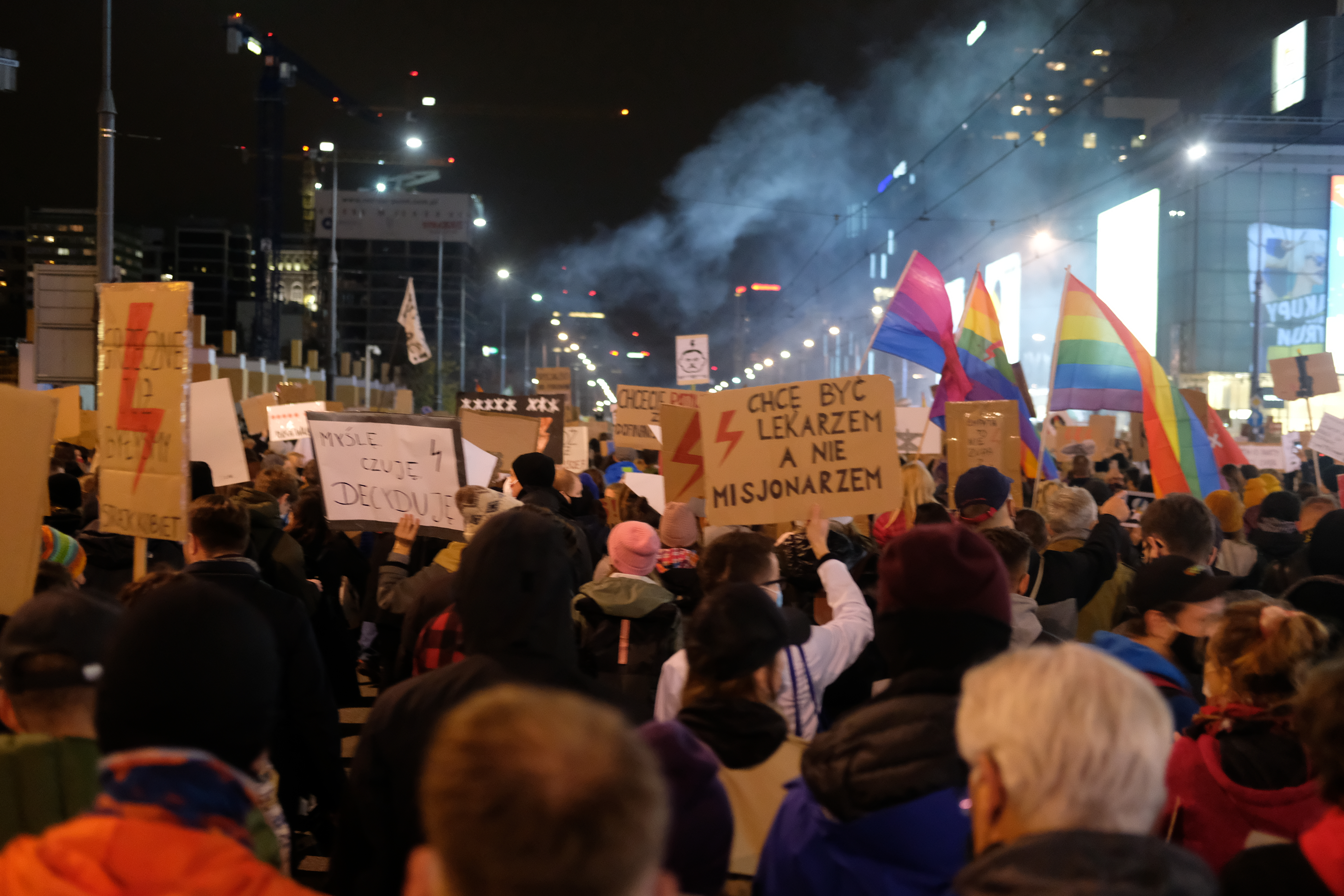
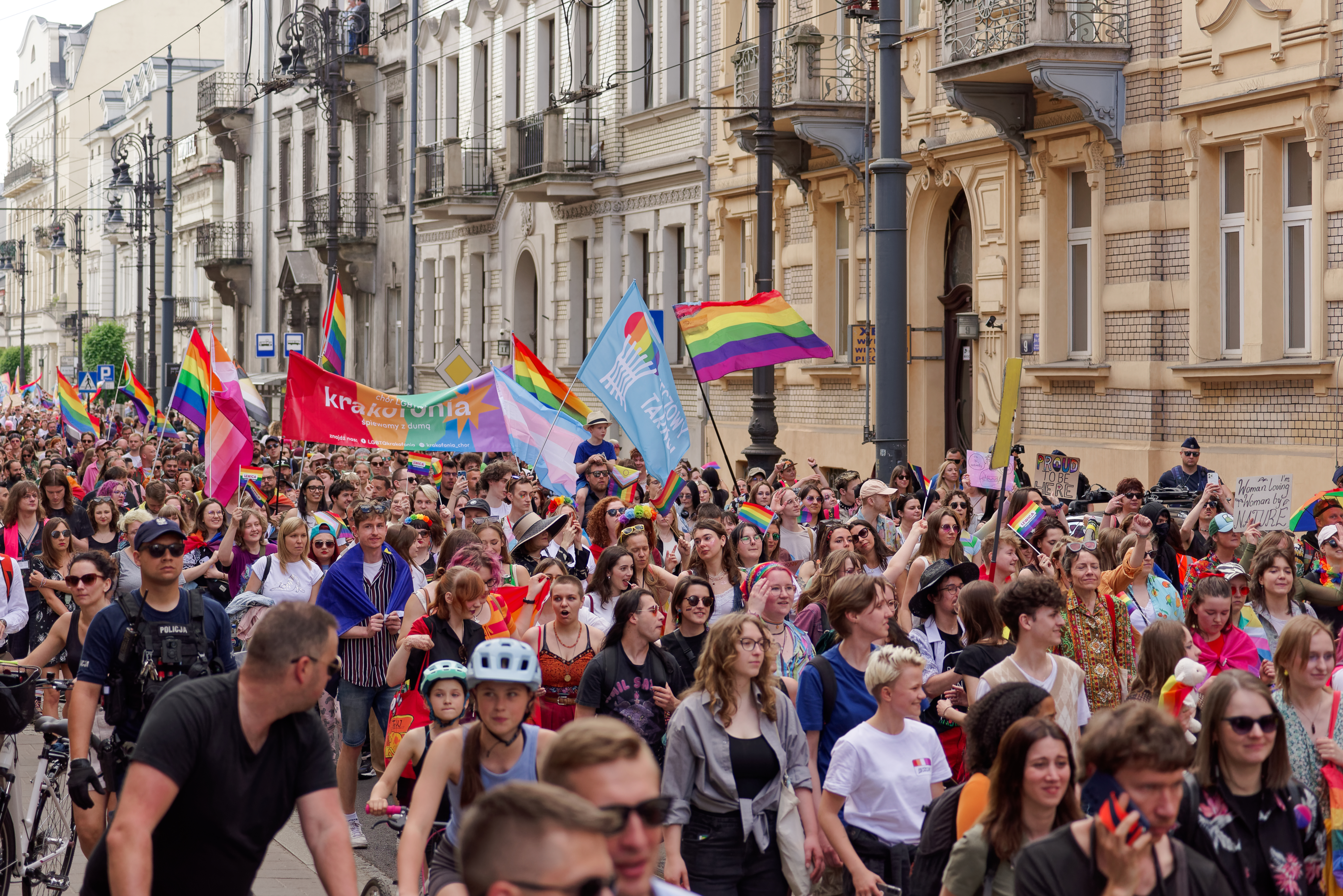
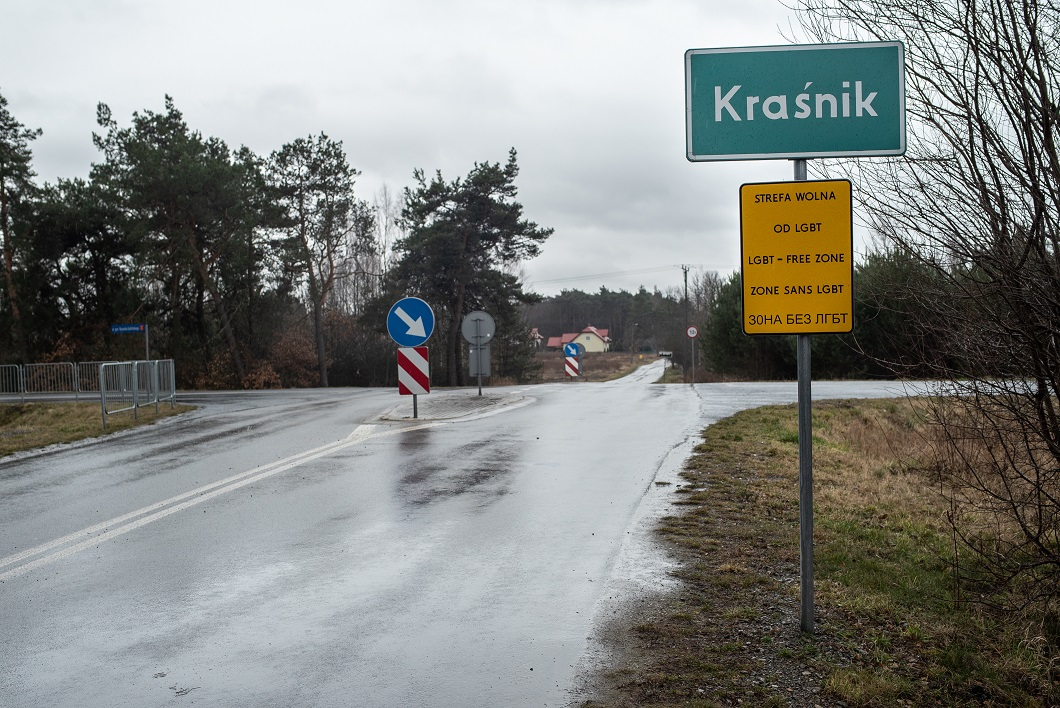
Anti-abortion poster in Bytom (top left)
2020 pro-choice protest in Warsaw (top right)
Pride parade in Kraków (bottom left)
LGBT-free zone sign in Kraśnik (bottom right)

Nawrocki ran a nationalist and socially conservative campaign, portraying the government as gender ideology radicals. He was opposed to the easing of Poland's abortion laws and the introduction of same-sex marriage or civil unions, instead supporting the instatement of closest person status for homosexual couples.

Trzaskowski was ideologically culturally liberal, supporting causes such as the LGBT rights movement, same-sex civil unions and abortion legalization, but moderated by standing against same-sex adoption and distancing himself from the LGBT movement. Trzaskowski stated he would appear at the nationalist Independence March if he won the election, despite usually obstructing the event's occurrence as Mayor of Warsaw.

Mentzen emphasized protection of free speech in his campaign, standing against "leftwing political correctness". Mentzen supported easing gun laws, legalization of marijuana and gambling. However, he also declared his opposition to legalized abortion. During the campaign, he refrained from tackling LGBT rights issues.

Braun postulated a total abortion ban, abolition of healthcare monopolies, Polish exit from the World Health Organization, universal access to guns, abolition of compulsory vaccination and introduction of school vouchers.

=== Welfare and taxation ===
Nawrocki supported social welfare programmes, calling for "a welfare state with zero VAT on food". He stressed the lack of transport in Poland and has pledged to develop rail infrastructure in underdeveloped regions of the country. His other proposals include abolishing tax on savings and increasing the annual indexation of pensions. He also expressed welfare chauvinist views — believing that Poles are "treated worse in their own country than immigrants", Nawrocki argued that social benefits in Poland should be for Poles only, and pensions for unemployed Ukrainian refugees should be eliminated; additionally, Polish citizens should have a priority in healthcare, school and kindergarten queues.

Mentzen's campaign oriented around the lowering of taxes, removing the inheritance tax, capital gains tax, and simplifying the personal income tax, corporate tax, value-added tax, among others.

Braun supported the abolition of income tax, corporation tax and compulsory health insurance.

== Campaign ==
=== First round ===
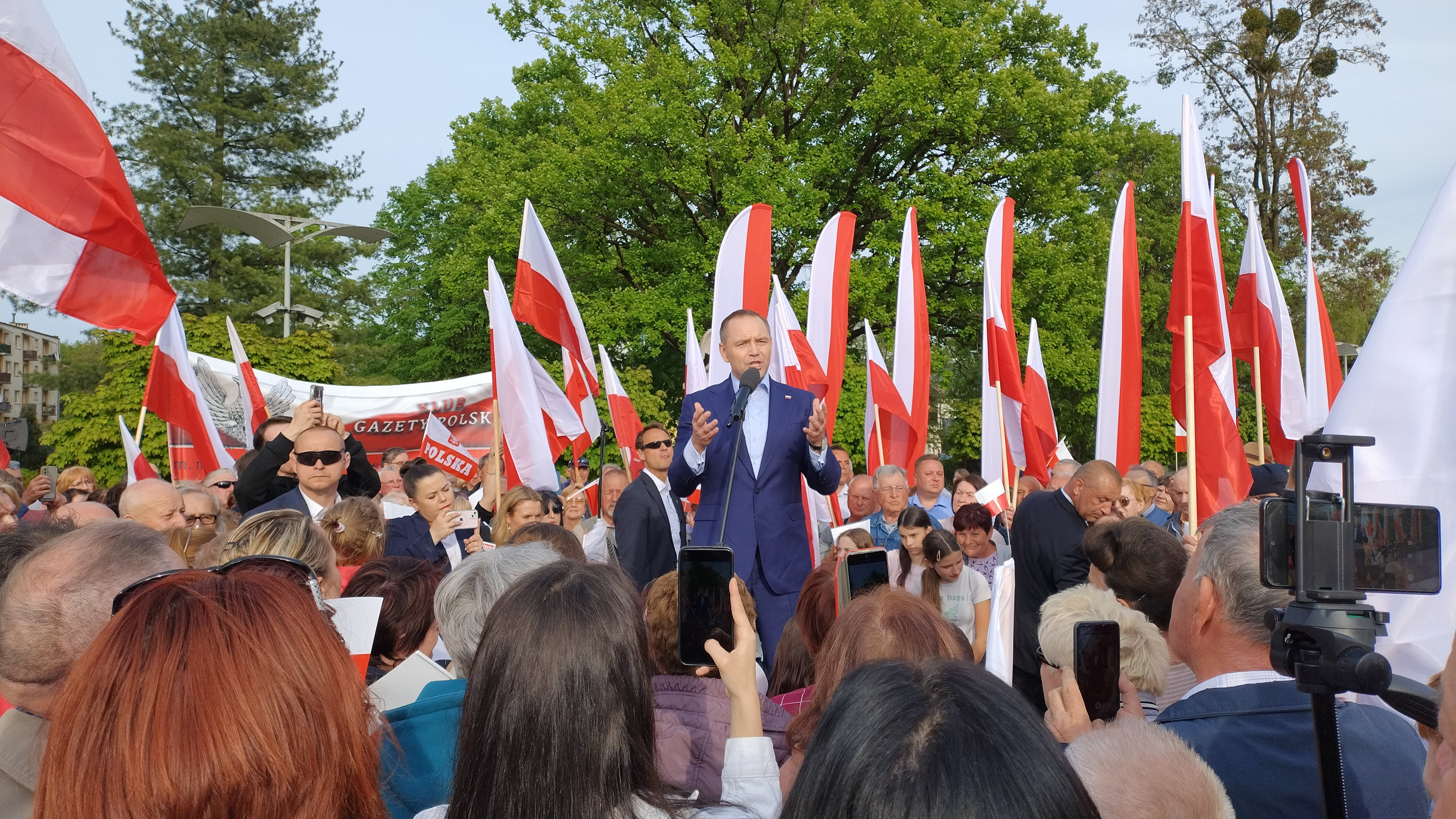
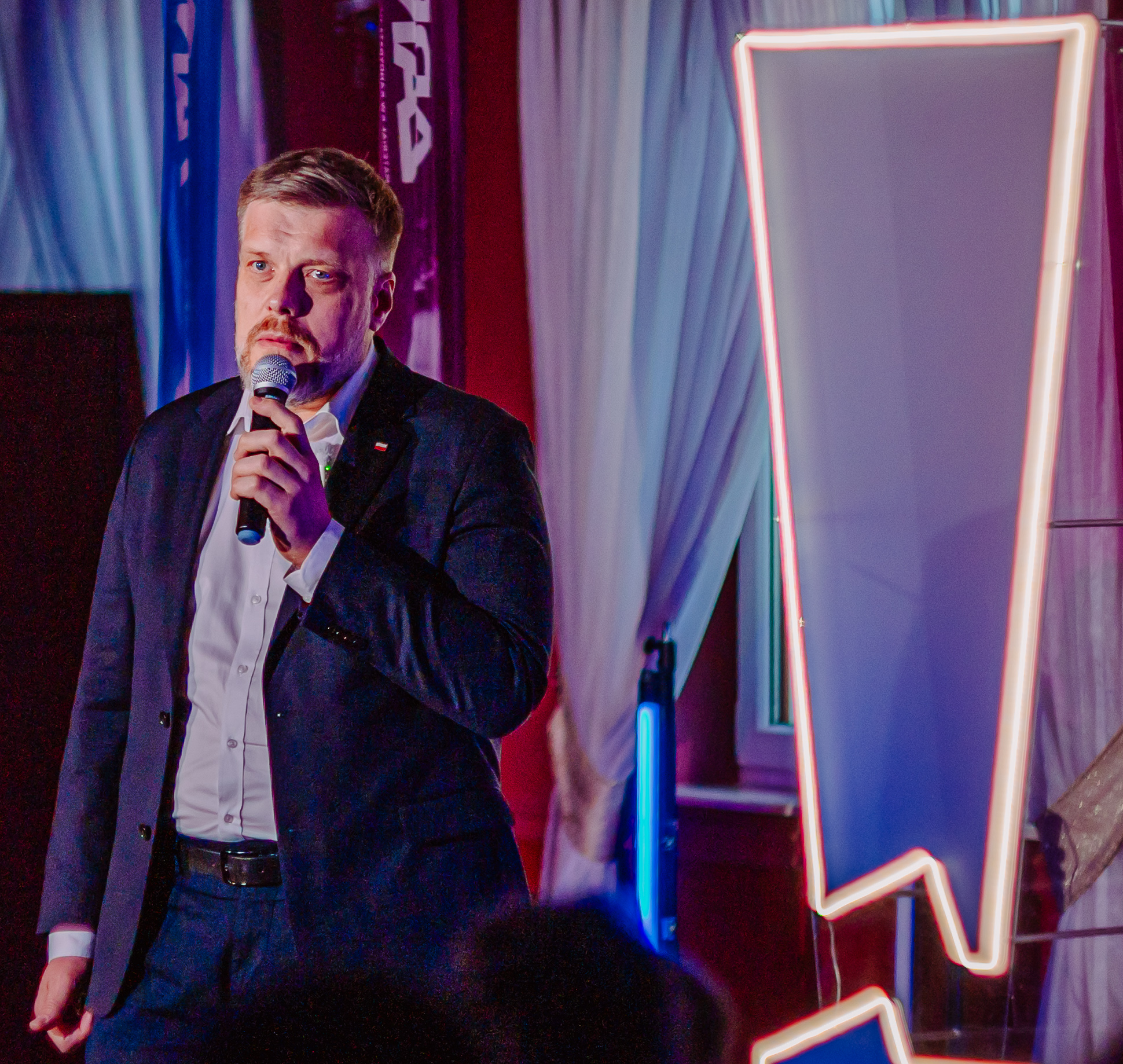
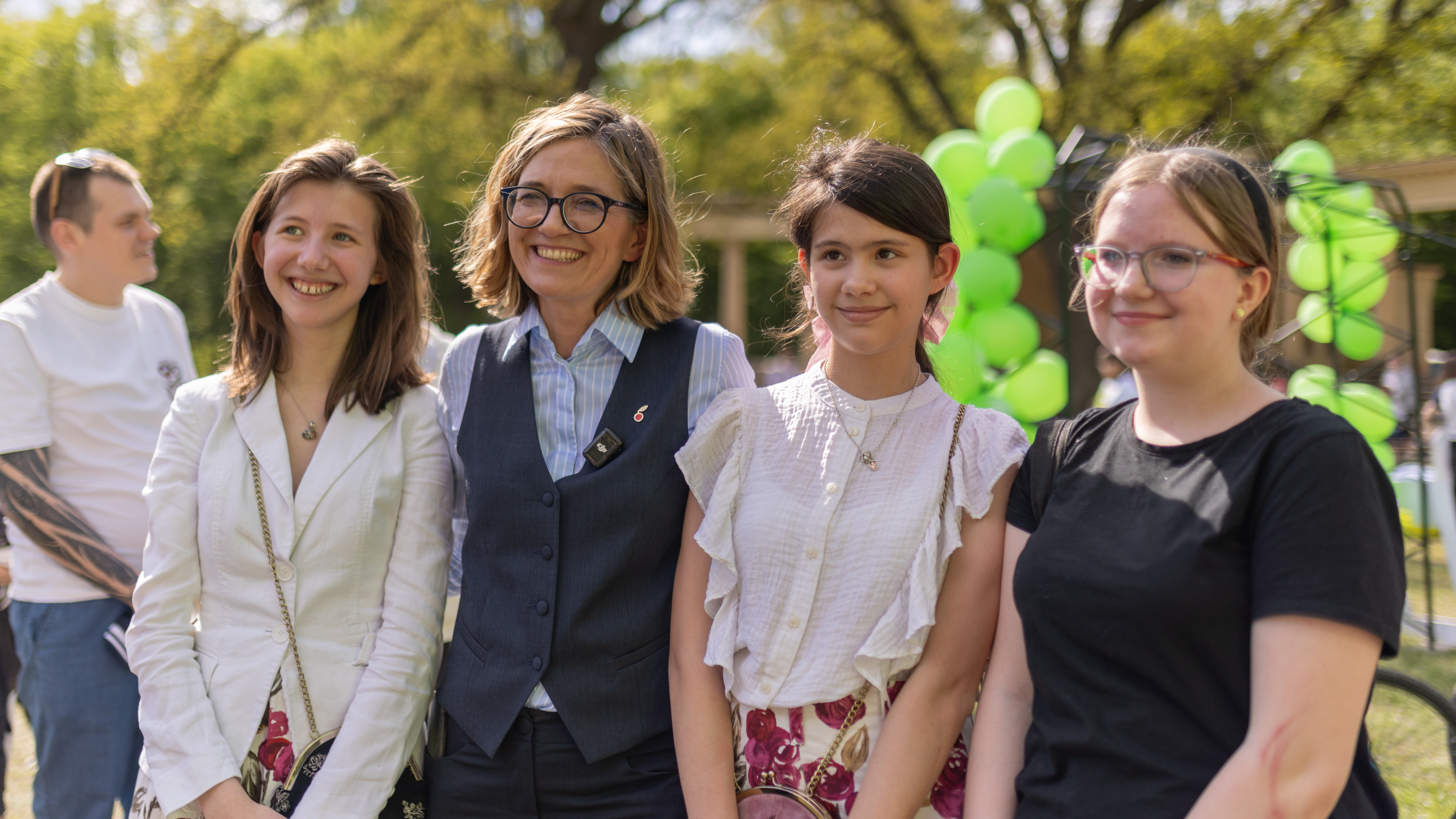
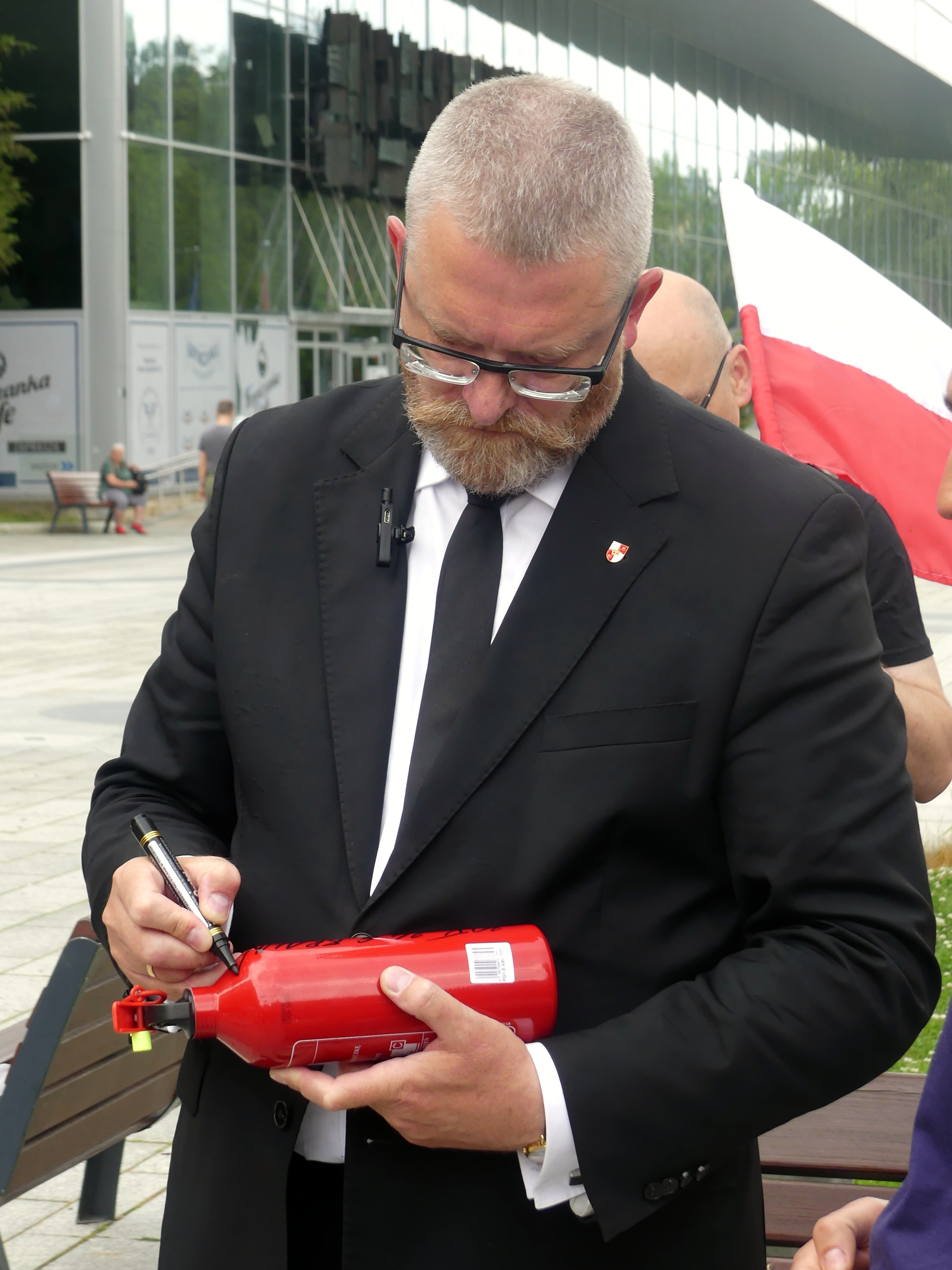
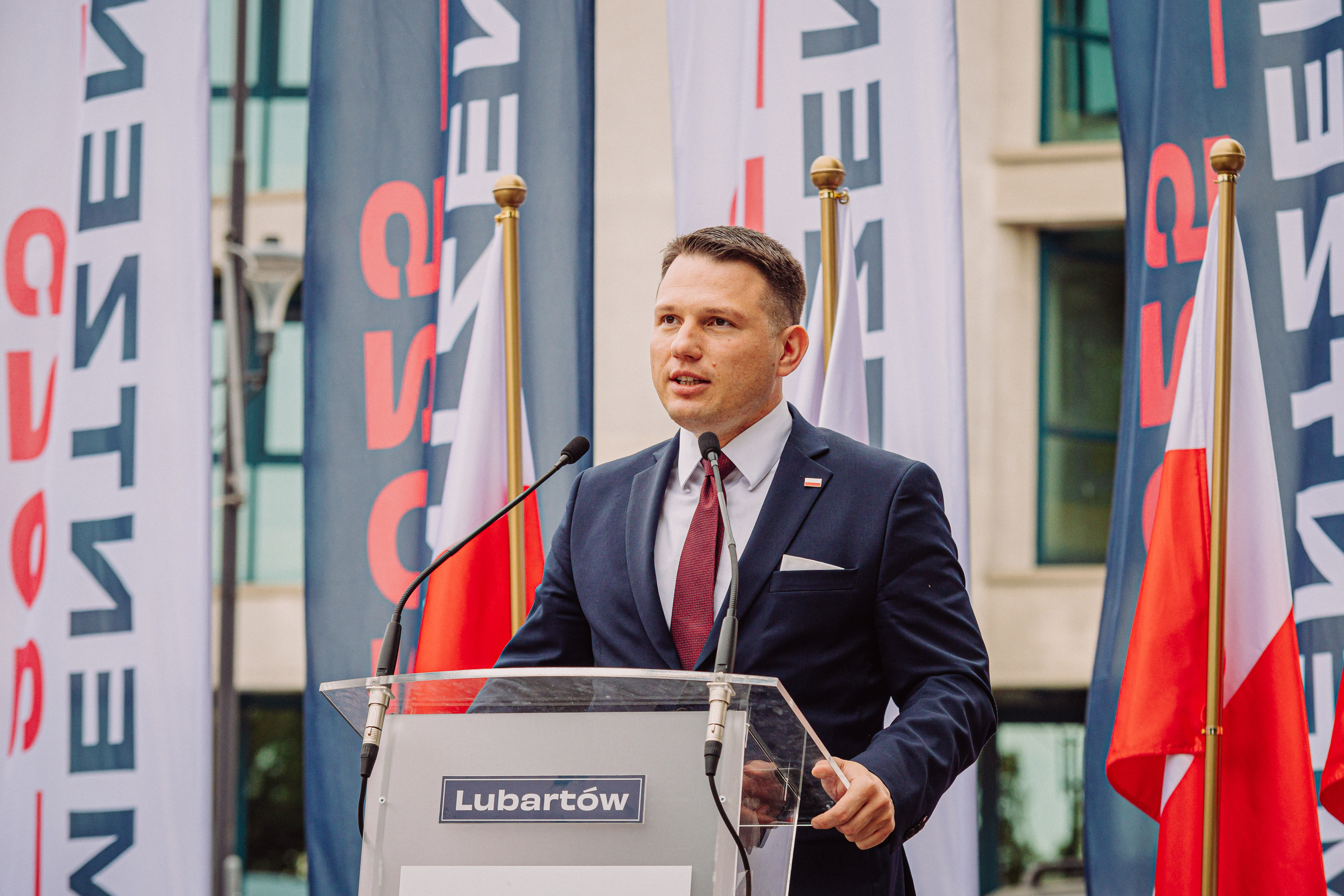
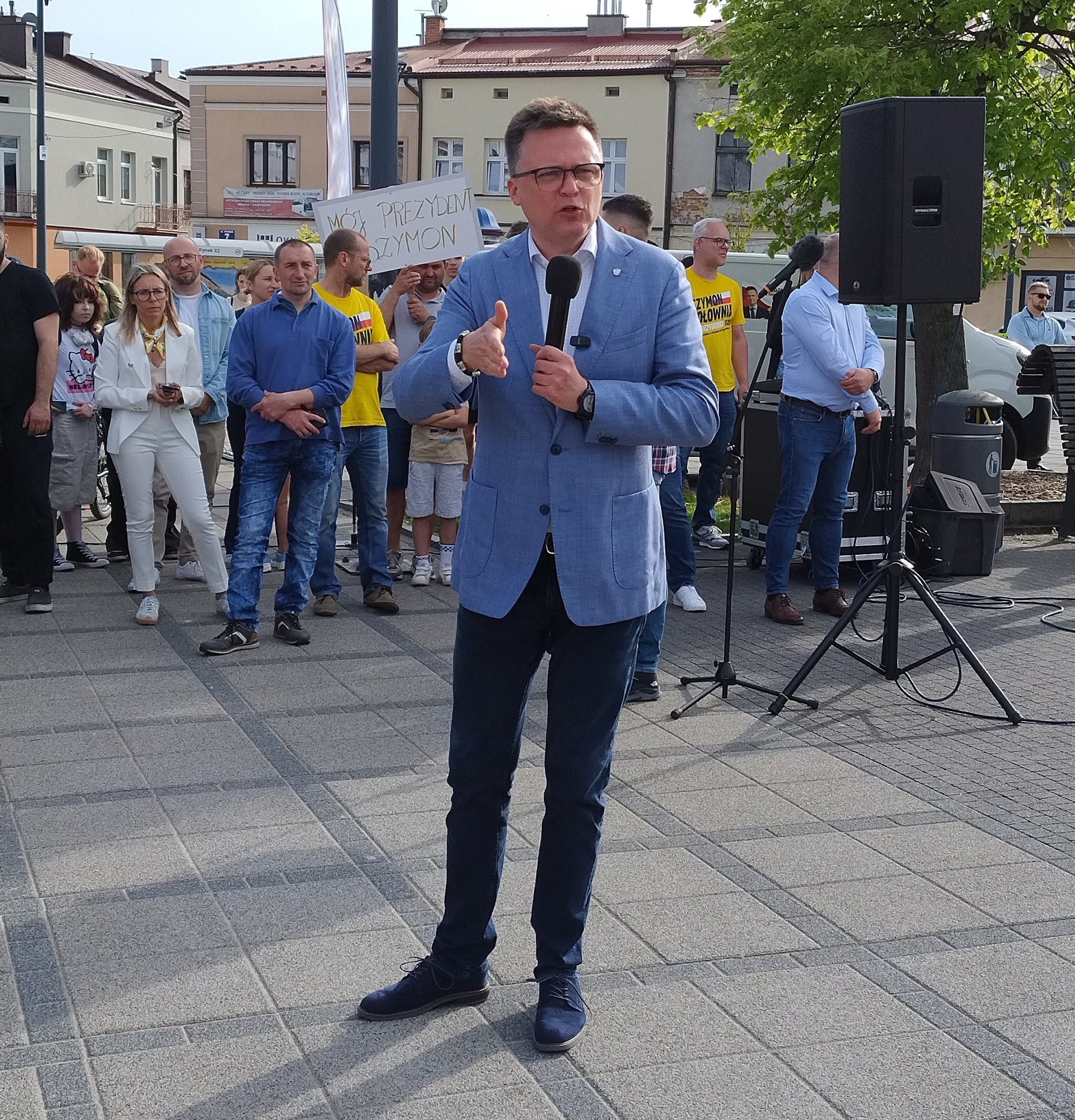
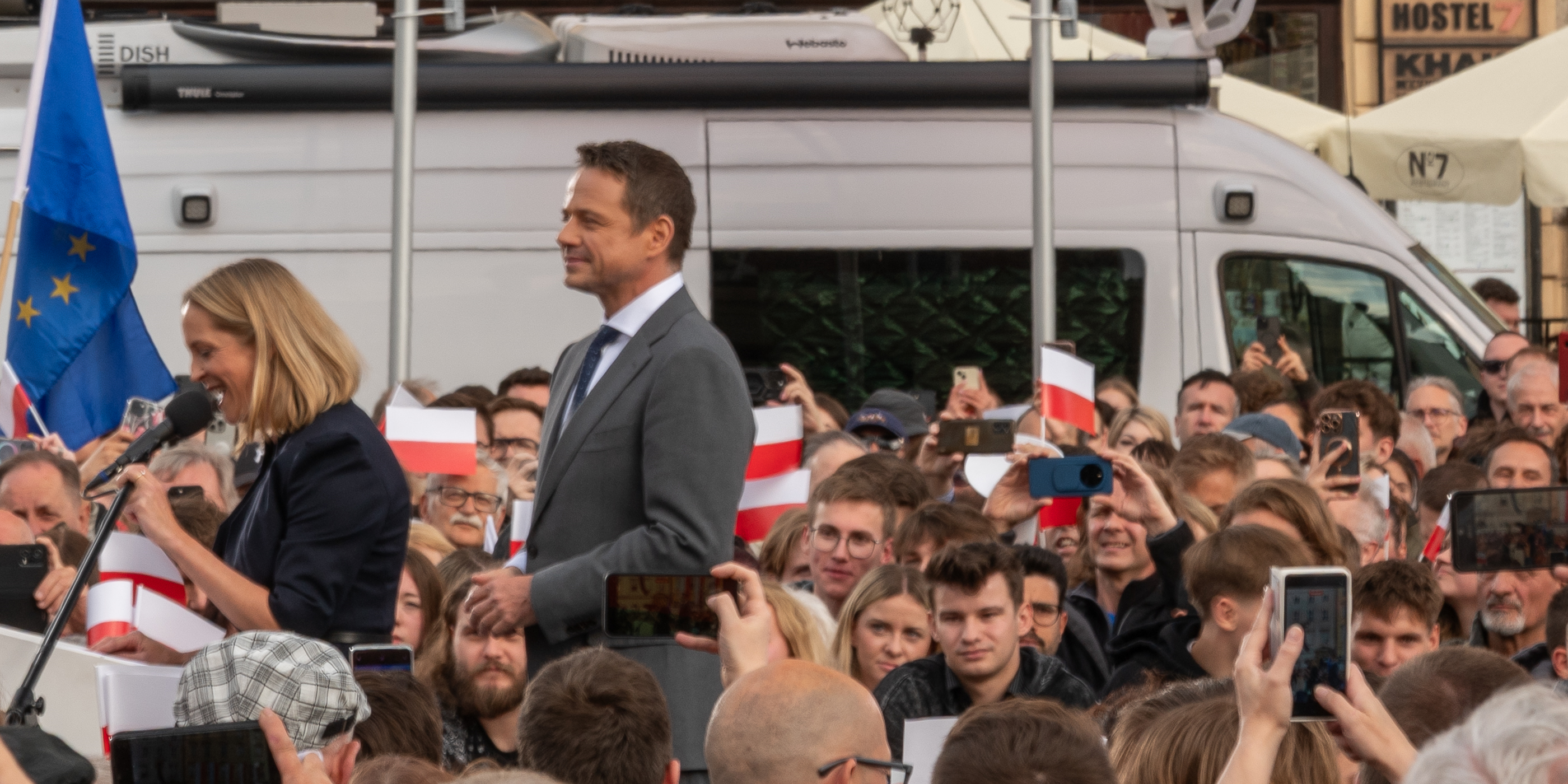
Candidates at campaign events, left to right and top to bottom: Nawrocki in Nowa Dęba, Zandberg in Lubartów, Biejat in Łódź, Braun in Krynica Zdrój, Mentzen in Lubartów, Hołownia in Mielec, Trzaskowski in Kraków.

Sławomir Mentzen of the Confederation alliance was the first candidate to begin an electoral campaign on 31 August 2024, drawing criticism and accusations of illegality from politicians of other parties for its early start. Marshal of the Sejm Szymon Hołownia from the Poland 2050 party declared his candidacy on 13 November. The Civic Coalition (KO) selected its candidate in a presidential primary on 22 November after Minister of Foreign Affairs Radosław Sikorski challenged presumptive nominee, Mayor of Warsaw Rafał Trzaskowski, who was KO's 2020 presidential candidate. Following the KO primary, Institute of National Remembrance chairman Karol Nawrocki was endorsed by the Law and Justice party on 24 November as an officially independent candidate, as he never belonged to any political party. Other groups also ran their own candidates. Parties of the left, the New Left and Razem, selected Magdalena Biejat and Adrian Zandberg respectively. On the right, the Free Republicans group endorsed Marek Jakubiak, and the Confederation of the Polish Crown ran Grzegorz Braun after splitting off from Mentzen's Confederation. Other candidates, not representing parties in parliament, also appeared: Artur Bartoszewicz (independent), Maciej Maciak (Prosperity and Peace Movement), Joanna Senyszyn (Democratic Left Association), Krzysztof Stanowski (independent) and Marek Woch (Bezpartyjni Samorządowcy). In total, the first round of the election had 13 candidates on the ballot, the largest amount of candidates tied with the 1995 presidential election.

Speculation swiftly began on whether PiS would replace Nawrocki when it was revealed that he had contact with a future criminal as part of his time as a boxer two decades prior, for which he was attacked by opposing politicians. Polling showed, however, that the vast plurality of people did not expect Nawrocki to be replaced. Nawrocki would continue being PiS' presidential candidate going into the first round and would face further controversies about his private life.

At the party conference on 2 March, Nawrocki declared the election a "referendum on rejecting Tusk", which would remain a theme throughout the campaign, referenced in events like the successful Zabrze recall referendum for the city's KO-aligned mayor, which occurred a week before the first round of the election. On 13 February 2025, Nawrocki was endorsed by Solidarity, Poland's largest trade union, pledging not to raise the age of retirement and to defend the minimum wage. Following the first round, on 20 May, Rural Solidarity also endorsed Nawrocki. At Nawrocki's electoral convention in Łódź on 26 April, he earned the endorsement of outgoing president Andrzej Duda, who previously refrained from issuing endorsements or supporting any of the candidates. Nawrocki also secured the support of Donald Trump, with Kristi Noem endorsing him at the first Polish CPAC event near Rzeszów on 27 May.

During the campaign, Trzaskowski took a "turn to the right"; Trzaskowski put forward the idea to limit welfare programs for non-working Ukrainian refugees which was proposed in the Sejm by Law and Justice on 20 January to "check" the genuinity of Trzaskowski's proposal. While being a supporter of LGBT rights, he was not outspoken about it. During the first TVP debate in Końskie, after being given an LGBT flag by Nawrocki, Trzaskowski first hid and then gave away the flag to his opponent, Magdalena Biejat. Despite being a supporter of same-sex civil unions, he spoke out against same-sex adoption.

Mentzen and Braun, who would come third and fourth in the election, campaigned along right-wing social and economic lines. Mentzen, who polled best among the youth, and eventually won the demographic, visited the largest amount of powiats out of all the other candidates. Some commentators believed Mentzen had a chance to enter the second round, and by March, Mentzen was rising in opinion polling, in some of them even slightly coming ahead of Nawrocki. However, he began declining afterwards.

In March, a controversy erupted over an abortion conducted in the 36th week of pregnancy of a fetus with a birth defect in a hospital in Oleśnica. Right-wing politicians criticized the abortion. President Duda called the act barbaric, Nawrocki called it murder and stated that the state should help children with disabilities, Braun came to notoriety regarding the incident when on 16 April, he, along with others, stormed into the hospital and constrained the gynecologist who conducted the abortion for several minutes, claiming to be doing a poseł's intervention for which, alongside other incidents, he lost his europarliamentary immunity. On 27 March, Mentzen held an interview with candidate Krzysztof Stanowski, during which his assertion expressing unconditional opposition to abortion and describing pregnancy resulting from rape as "unpleasant" sparked significant backlash, with some commentators attributing his decline in polling by late March to this statement.

An important election issue was the matter of the health insurance contribution (Polish: składka zdrowotna), with the country's poor healthcare being amongst the most important problems. In April, the center and center-right parties in the coalition government narrowly voted to decrease the health insurance contribution for entrepreneurs, which sparked protests from the left, especially MPs from Razem, accusing the government of attempting to undermine and then privatize public healthcare. On 11 April, Razem's leader, Adrian Zandberg, missed the first TVP debate to have an audience with President Andrzej Duda about the health contribution, which he vetoed on 6 May. Following Duda's veto of the decrease, Trzaskowski defended his party's health insurance contribution proposal, stating it would lead to increase the amount of money in the healthcare system, with Hołownia also approving of the proposal. Meanwhile, Nawrocki and Biejat disagreed, speaking of the already poor state of Poland's healthcare.

During the course of the campaign, public criticism emerged over Nawrocki's acquisition of a second apartment from an elderly man in pre-trial detention. As Nawrocki had declared to own just one apartment during a debate, Onet publicized information about him owning a second one. The candidate proceeded to declare that he had acquired the second apartment from the elderly man for pledging lifelong care in exchange, however it was revealed the man was placed in a state care facility without Nawrocki's involvement. Amid accusations of exploitation, Nawrocki defended the deal's legality and promised to donate the property to charity.

=== Second round ===
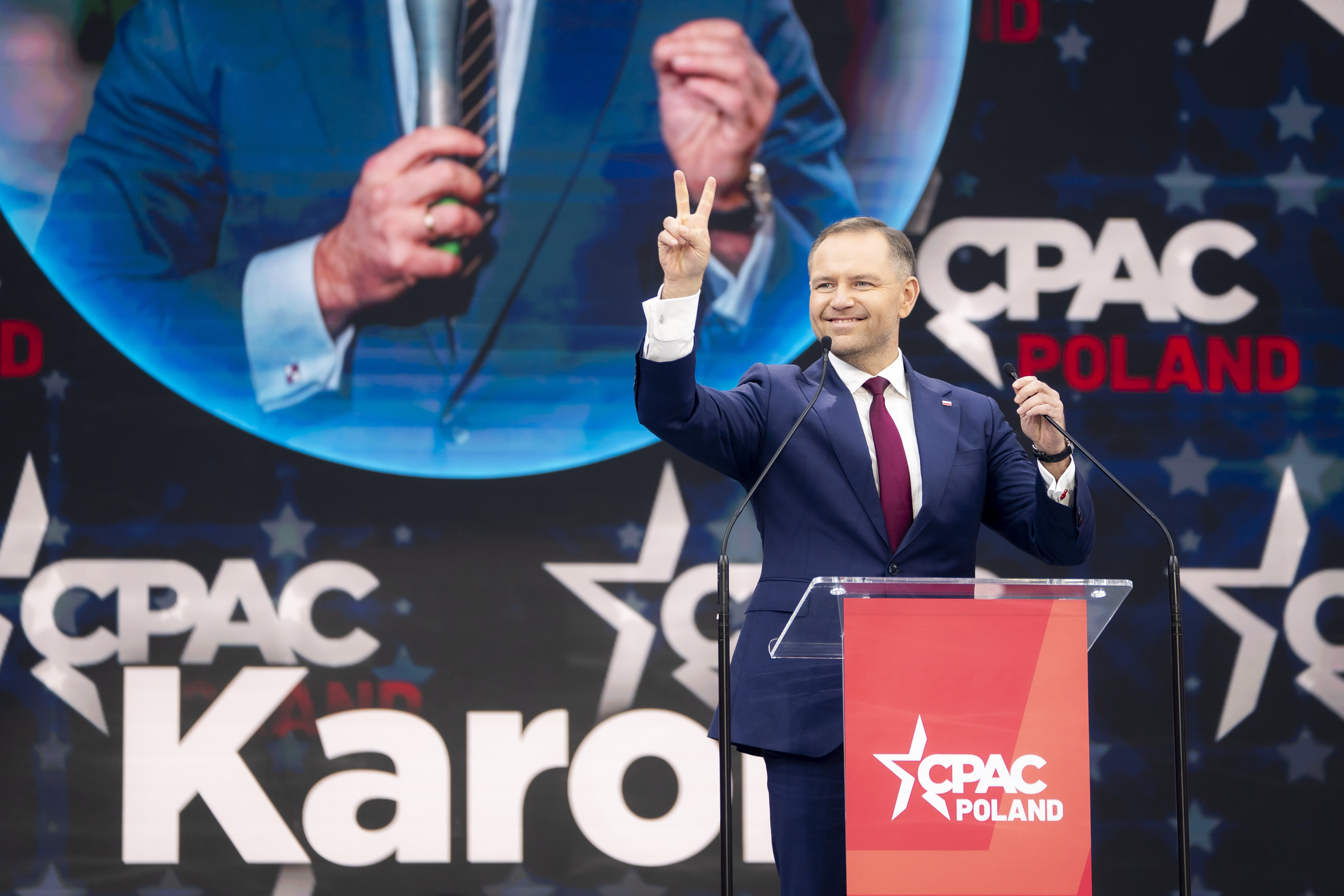
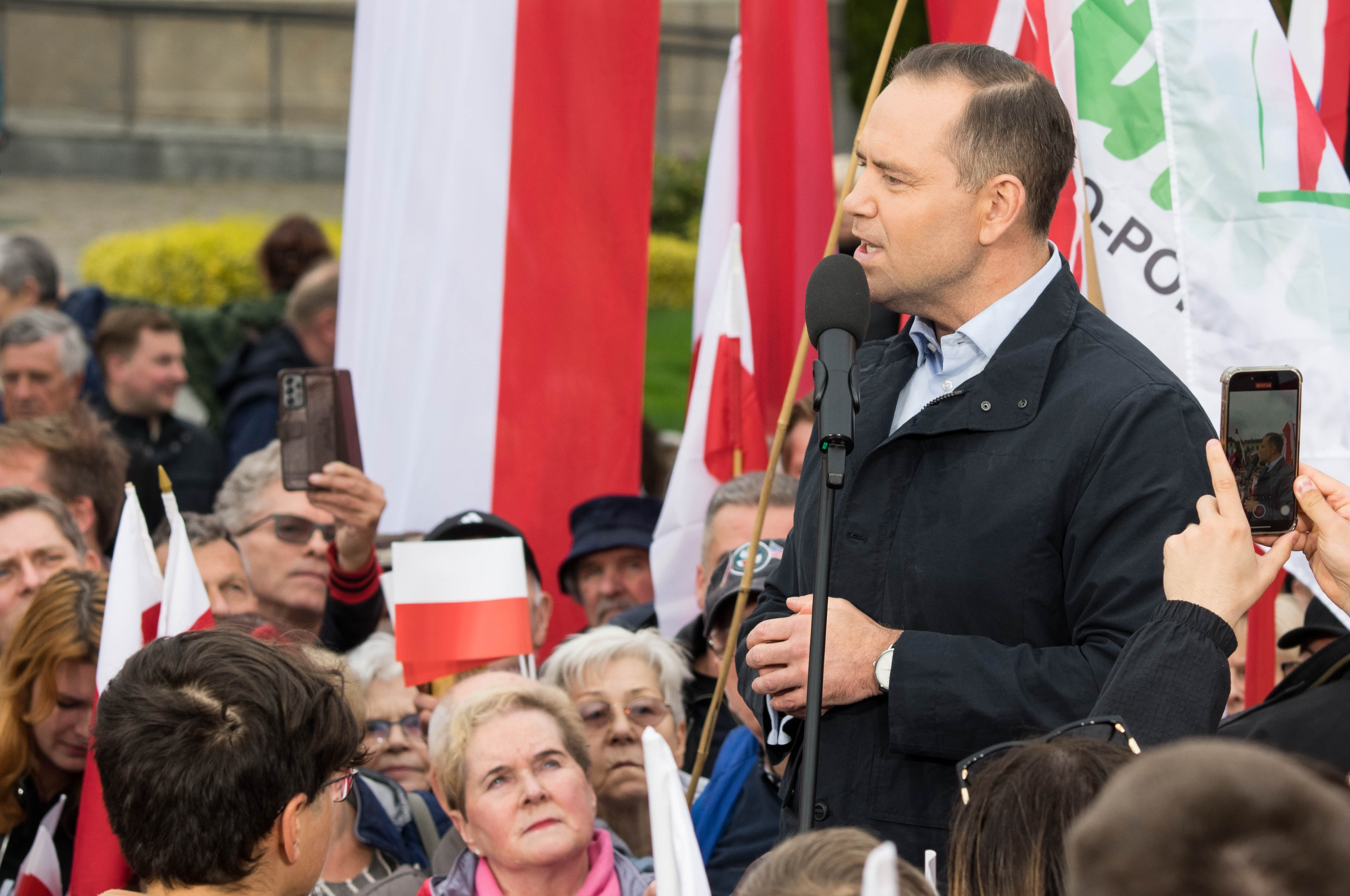
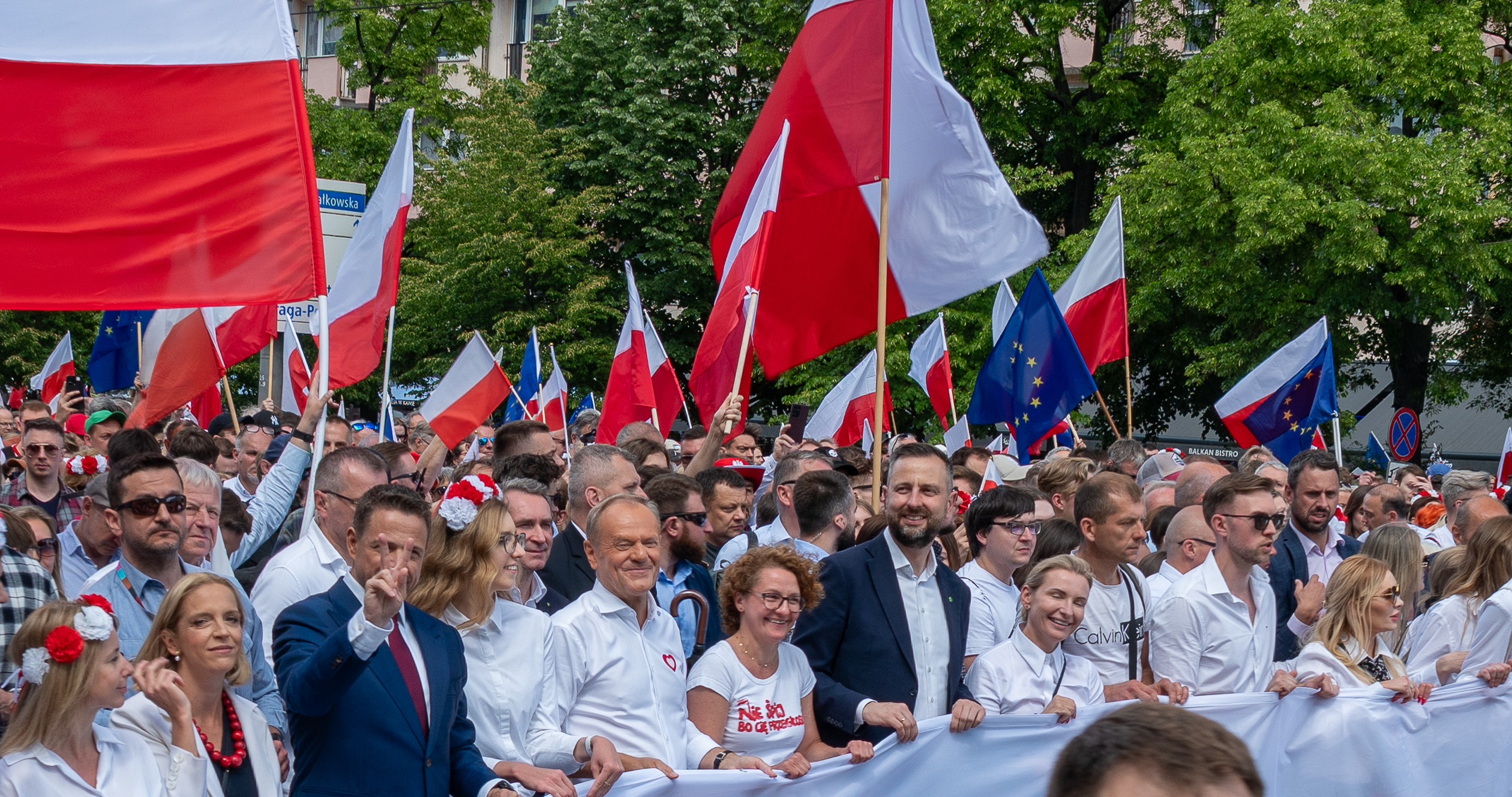
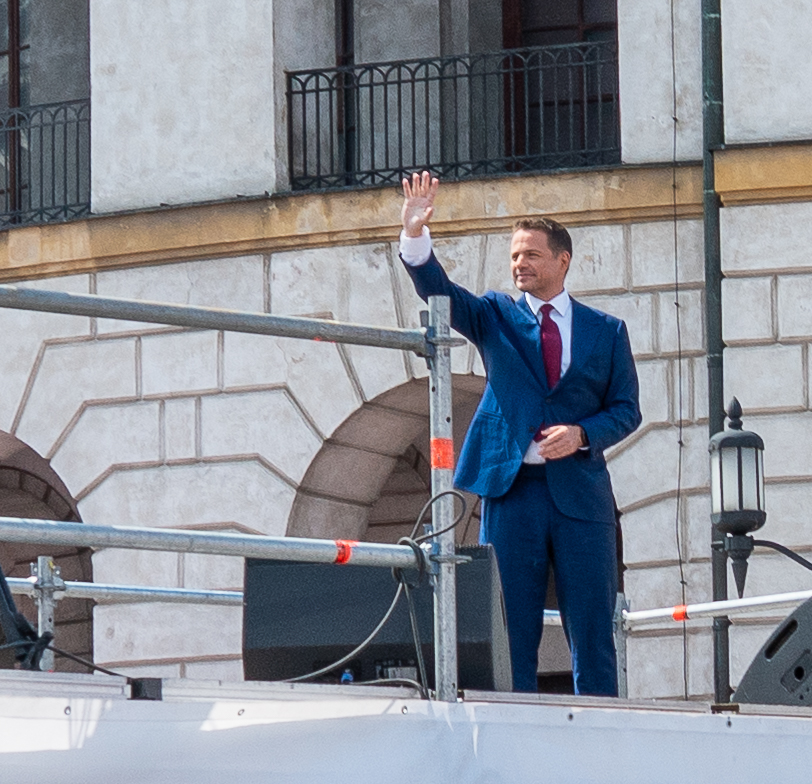
Candidates at campaign events in the second round.
First row: Nawrocki at a CPAC event in Jasionka, Nawrocki at a rally in Bydgoszcz.
Second row: Trzaskowski at his "Great March of Patriots" in Warsaw.

Trzaskowski and Nawrocki advanced to the second round, with Nawrocki overperforming in the polls. Hołownia and Biejat quickly endorsed Trzaskowski, and Jakubiak endorsed Nawrocki. Mentzen, who came third in the first round with 14.8% of the vote, called both advancing candidates to meet with him in a public meeting, and presented a set of eight points (Note: The declaration included commitments to not allow for: the introduction of new taxes or increasing existing ones; introduction of the Euro in Poland; the restricting of freedom of speech, abiding by the constitution; sending soldiers to Ukrainian territory; allowing Ukrainian accession to NATO; the restricting of access to arms for private citizens; transfer of additional powers to European Union institutions; signing of European Union treaties that would weaken Poland) for each candidate to sign onto, which were signed by Nawrocki. Trzaskowski also appeared on 24 May 2025, agreeing with four out of the eight points, but not agreeing to sign onto them, and being more assertive towards the host. Following Trzaskowski's appearance, he went out to drink with Mentzen, generating accusations of Mentzen being a traitor by Confederation figures. Trzaskowski, meanwhile, faced criticism from Left supporters, which were dissatisfied with him drinking with a far-right politician.

Shortly after the completion of the first round, both candidates announced launching rallies of support to be held in Warsaw on the same day, 25 May. Differing turnout estimates were presented, ranging between 130,000 and 160,000, including Romanian president-elect Nicușor Dan, for Trzaskowski's march and between 50,000 and 70,000 for Nawrocki's rally.

Throughout the second round, Nawrocki encountered a set of new controversies involving his personal life, beginning with the revelation that he had previously participated in a 70 vs 70 football hooligans' fight (Polish: ustawka) between fans of Lechia Gdańsk and Lech Poznań. Facing criticism, he accused Prime Minister Tusk of likewise participating in football hooliganism in his youth, and called the fights "noble battles". It also came to light that Nawrocki had Chelsea F.C. and Lechia Gdańsk tattoos on his torso. Further controversies about Nawrocki's personal background emerged due to allegations of him having worked as a bodyguard for prostitutes in a five-star Grand Hotel in Sopot in his youth and using nicotine pouches (erroneously referred to as snus) while on air during a presidential debate, causing allegations of him possibly being heavily addicted to nicotine.

Meanwhile, Trzaskowski's campaign was hampered by party colleagues — KO poseł Kinga Gajewska was criticized for taking photos handing nursing home residents sacks of potatoes, former President Bronisław Komorowski claiming he most proudly hunts ducks (Polish: Kaczory, implying PiS leaders Lech and Jarosław Kaczyński), KO poseł Przemysław Witek sarcastically responding with "What's the harm in promising?" to the question about whether Trzaskowski and KO would agree to Mentzen's postulate of not imposing any new taxes, and Prime Minister Donald Tusk citing convicted Freak Fighter Jacek Murański as his main source for Nawrocki's Grand Hotel allegations, sounding like he was favoring Murański's comments more than the research conducted by his own government ministries in the early 2010's.

=== Second round candidate endorsements ===
All.	Party	2023 votes	Endorsement
ZP	Law and Justice	31.72% (Note: Aggregate results for Law and Justice (29.11%), Sovereign Poland (2.15%) and The Republicans (0.46%))	Karol Nawrocki
ZP	Freedom and Prosperity	31.72%	Karol Nawrocki
ZP	Renewal of the Republic of Poland	31.72%	Karol Nawrocki
ZP	Kukiz'15	0.35%	Karol Nawrocki
KO	Civic Platform	23.12%	Rafał Trzaskowski
KO	League of Polish Families	23.12%	Rafał Trzaskowski
KO	Yes! For Poland	23.12%	Rafał Trzaskowski
KO	Modern	1.74%	Rafał Trzaskowski
KO	The Greens	0.31%	Rafał Trzaskowski
KO	AGROunia	0.25%	Against Nawrocki
KO	Democratic Left Association	0.01%	Rafał Trzaskowski
TD	Poland 2050	7.23%	Rafał Trzaskowski
TD	Polish People's Party	5.51%	Rafał Trzaskowski
TD	Centre for Poland	0.32%	Rafał Trzaskowski
TD	Union of European Democrats	0.10%	Rafał Trzaskowski
L	New Left	5.55%	Rafał Trzaskowski
L	Razem	2.10%	No endorsement
L	Labour Union	0.05%	Rafał Trzaskowski
L	Polish Socialist Party	0.02%	No endorsement
L	Freedom and Equality	0.002%	Karol Nawrocki
KWiN	New Hope	2.56%	Against Trzaskowski
KWiN	National Movement	0.92%	Against Trzaskowski
KWiN	Confederation of the Polish Crown	0.85%	Karol Nawrocki
Candidate		First round	Endorsement
Sławomir Mentzen		14.81%	Against Trzaskowski (Note: Candidate asked his voters to vote based on their conscience without explicitly supporting either of the second round candidates, but stated: "I see no reason to vote for Rafał Trzaskowski." and when speaking of Karol Nawrocki, he argued: "The choice should be obvious. We have a candidate who has signed a declaration that he will abide by them.” Media reports noted that while officially not endorsing anyone, Mentzen "made clear gestures towards Karol Nawrocki." Nawrocki also claimed that Mentzen privately expressed support for him. Political scientist Gavin Rae argued that while not endorsing either candidate, Mentzen declared himself against Trzaskowski. Ultimately, 87.2% of Mentzen's voters voted for Nawrocki in the second round.)
Grzegorz Braun		6.34%	Karol Nawrocki
Szymon Hołownia		4.99%	Rafał Trzaskowski
Adrian Zandberg		4.86%	No endorsement
Magdalena Biejat		4.23%	Rafał Trzaskowski
Krzysztof Stanowski		1.24%	Against both (Note: The candidate declared his intention to cast an invalid vote.)
Joanna Senyszyn		1.09%	Rafał Trzaskowski
Marek Jakubiak		0.77%	Karol Nawrocki
Artur Bartoszewicz		0.49%	Karol Nawrocki
Maciej Maciak		0.19%	Boycott
Marek Woch		0.09%	Karol Nawrocki

==== Other endorsements ====
Extraparliamentary parties	Endorsement
Bezpartyjni Samorządowcy	Karol Nawrocki
German Minority Electoral Committee	No endorsement
KORWiN	Karol Nawrocki
Jesus is Lord (There is One Poland)	Karol Nawrocki
Right Wing of the Republic	Karol Nawrocki
Rodacy Kamraci	Karol Nawrocki
Patriotic Movement	Karol Nawrocki
Self-Defence of the Republic of Poland	Karol Nawrocki
People's Party "Patrimony"	Karol Nawrocki
Real Politics Union	Karol Nawrocki
United Beyond Boundaries	Karol Nawrocki
Union of Christian Families	Karol Nawrocki
European Party	Endorsement
European Conservatives and Reformists Party	Karol Nawrocki
European Green Party	Rafał Trzaskowski
European People's Party	Rafał Trzaskowski
Union of European Federalists	Rafał Trzaskowski
Volt Europa	Rafał Trzaskowski (Note: Endorsed by the Polish branch of the Pan-European movement, Volt Poland.)

==== Foreign politicians ====
Country	Position	Leader	Party	Endorsement
Hungary	Prime Minister	Viktor Orbán	Fidesz	Karol Nawrocki
Hungary	Foreign Minister	Péter Szijjártó	Fidesz	Karol Nawrocki
Romania	President	Nicușor Dan (Note: Candidate in the 2025 Romanian presidential election, the second round of which took place on the same day as the first round of the Polish election.)	Independent	Rafał Trzaskowski
Romania	Party leader	George Simion	Alliance for the Union of Romanians	Karol Nawrocki
USA	President	Donald Trump	Republican Party	Karol Nawrocki
USA	Secretary of Homeland Security	Kristi Noem	Republican Party	Karol Nawrocki

== Debates ==
Ten debates were organized, with eight directly between candidates participating in the election, with most excluding Maciej Maciak. Due to the boycotting of debates hosted by the right-wing TV Republika by Trzaskowski and Biejat, the two candidates had the lowest turnout, with Trzaskowski or his representative appearing at only 56% of the debates he was invited to.

Końskie TVP debate winner IBRiS poll (Note: Sample size: 1,067, polling period: 12 April 2025)
Trzaskowski	32.4%
Nawrocki	28.0%
Hołownia	11.8%
Biejat	10.6%
Stanowski	5.3%
Jakubiak	4.2%
Senyszyn	0.2%
Maciak	0.0%

On 11 April 2025, two debates took place in Końskie, widely described as chaotic. One was organized by TV Republika, wPolsce24 and the Catholic Telewizja Trwam, with five candidates participating (Hołownia, Jakubiak, Nawrocki, Senyszyn, Stanowski). Another one, organized by Trzaskowski's committee and moderated by journalists of TVP, TVN and Polsat, was held at the town's sports hall once the candidates from the earlier debate joined Biejat, Maciak and Trzaskowski. The former was initiated in opposition to the latter event, which organization started spontaneously on 9 April, and which in the beginning was meant for just the two leading candidates, however other ones were also invited just shortly before its planned start. An IBRiS poll showed most respondents showing Trzaskowski (32.4%) as the winner of the debate, ahead of Nawrocki (28.0%), Hołownia (11.8%) and Biejat (10.6%). However, Marcin Duma, the chairman of IBRiS, commented that relative to their standings in voting intention polls, Hołownia and Biejat were the clear winners of the debate.

On 12 May 2025 an official presidential debate involving all 13 candidates was hosted by the state broadcaster Telewizja Polska. During the debate, two questions were published by an employee of the broadcaster Jarosław Olechowski on Twitter prior to being asked by the host Dorota Wysocka-Schnepf; one at the time of their publication, the other over an hour later.

On 23 May 2025, the first second-round debate was held between Nawrocki and Trzaskowski. The debate had thematic sections for healthcare, foreign policy, economics, welfare, security and social policy. Nawrocki was criticized for using a nicotine pouch (snus) in the middle of the debate. Meanwhile, Trzaskowski caused controversy for calling Stowarzyszenie Demagog to fact-check Nawrocki, which confirmed Nawrocki's statement.

The final debate of the election, organized by Telewizja Republika, was set to take place on 28 May 2025 in the market square of Końskie. However, Trzaskowski ultimately declined the invitation and instead travelled to Kalisz to speak with voters in a one-on-one format there. Nawrocki's televised conversation with the town's residents was interrupted by Witold Zembaczyński, who drew attention to himself using a deck of cards and by running in front of the stage.

Journalist Krzysztof Stanowski, himself a candidate, held extensive interviews with all of the other candidates, except for Maciej Maciak, the interview with whom was ended abruptly just after a few minutes once Maciak expressed favorable views about the Russian president Vladimir Putin. Stanowski's interviews had a major influence on the course of the electoral campaign.

#	Date	Time (CEST)	Location	Hosted by	Host(s)	Ref
1	11 April 2025	18:50	Końskie	TV Republika; TV Trwam; wPolsce24	Katarzyna Gójska; Jakub Więcław; Michał Adamczyk	
2	11 April 2025	20:44	Końskie	TVP; TVN; Polsat; Campaign staff of Trzaskowski (Note: The debate was organised by Trzaskowski's campaign committee; TVP, TVN, and Polsat all agreed to conduct and transmit the debate. The TV signal was also available for other stations.)	Joanna Dunikowska-Paź; Grzegorz Kajdanowicz; Piotr Witwicki	
3	14 April 2025	20:03	Warsaw	TV Republika	Katarzyna Gójska	
4	28 April 2025	18:00	Warsaw	Super Express	Jan Złotorowicz; Jacek Prusinowski	
5	30 April 2025	20:00	Gdynia	Campaign teams of Biejat and Hołownia	Joanna Dzieniszewska; Łukasz Michnik	
6	5 May 2025	20:00	Polsat studio	Polsat News	Piotr Witwicki	
7	9 May 2025	20:00	Warsaw	TV Republika; TV Trwam; wPolsce24	Katarzyna Gójska; Piotr Krupa; Michał Adamczyk	
8	12 May 2025	20:00	TVP headquarters, Warsaw	TVP; TVN; Polsat	Dorota Wysocka-Schnepf; Radomir Wit; Piotr Witwicki	
9	23 May 2025	20:00	TVP headquarters, Warsaw	TVP; TVN; Polsat; (Note: The TV signal was also available for other stations.)	Jacek Prusinowski (Super Express)	
10	28 May 2025	20:00	Końskie	TV Republika	Katarzyna Gójska	

=== Participation ===
The following is a table of participating candidates in each debate:

Participating candidates
Candidate
Candidate	P Present I Invited, not present N Not invited										Total	Attnd.
Candidate	1	2	3	4	5	6 (Note: Campaign staffers' debate, staffers representing candidates in parentheses: Marcin Bartoszewicz (Artur Bartoszewicz); Anna Górska (Magdalena Biejat); Marta Czech (Grzegorz Braun); Paweł Śliz (Szymon Hołownia); Jarosław Sachajko (Marek Jakubiak); Przemysław Wipler (Sławomir Mentzen); Tobiasz Bocheński (Karol Nawrocki); Monika Rosa (Rafał Trzaskowski); Piotr Bakun (Joanna Senyszyn); Wojciech Hadaj (Krzysztof Stanowski); Paweł Frankiewicz (Marek Woch); Marcelina Zawisza (Adrian Zandberg))	7	8	9	10	Total	Attnd.
Bartoszewicz	I	I	P	P	N	P	P	P	N	N	5	71%
Biejat	I	P	I	P	P	P	I	P	N	N	5	63%
Braun	I	I	P	P	N	P	P	P	N	N	5	71%
Hołownia	P	P	P	P	P	P	P	P	N	N	8	100%
Jakubiak	P	P	P	P	N	P	P	P	N	N	7	100%
Maciak	N	P	N	P	N	N	N	P	N	N	3	100%
Mentzen	I	I	P	P	N	P	P	P	N	N	5	71%
Nawrocki	P	P	P	P	N	P	P	P	P	P	9	100%
Senyszyn	P	P	P	P	N	P	P	P	N	N	7	100%
Stanowski	P	P	P	P	N	P	P	P	N	N	7	100%
Trzaskowski	I	P	I	P	N	P	I	P	P	I	5	56%
Woch	I	I	P	P	N	P	P	P	N	N (Note: Woch arrived at the end of the debate to endorse Nawrocki.)	5	71%
Zandberg	I	I	P	P	N	P	P	P	N	N	5	71%

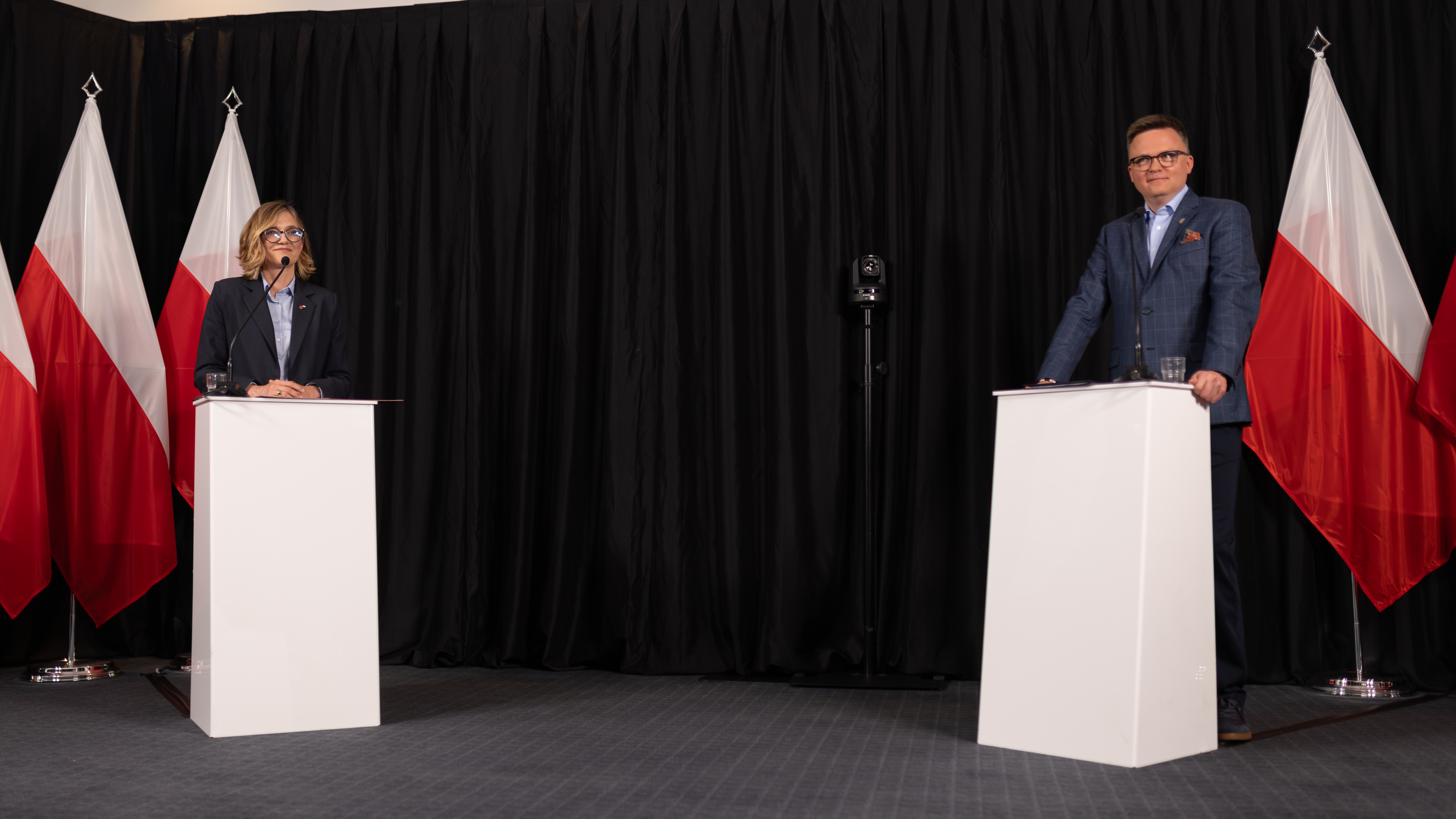
Biejat-Hołownia debate on 30 April in Gdynia

== Timeline ==
Marshal of the Sejm Szymon Hołownia announced the election day on 8 January 2025; the following schedule was approved by the National Electoral Commission on 15 January 2025:

Timeline of the 2025 Polish presidential election

Date	Event description
until 24 March 2025	Notifying the National Electoral Commission of setting up election committees for candidates for the Presidency of the Republic of Poland
until 31 March 2025	The appointment of constituency electoral commissions
until 4 April 2025 at 16:00 CEST	Submitting to the National Electoral Commission candidates for the Presidency of the Republic of Poland
from 4 April 2025 until 15 May 2025	Submitting by voters requests to: issue the certificate confirming the right to vote in the place of residence on election day, change the voting location, Submitting by soldiers performing basic military service or those performing military training and policemen serving in quarted units, officers of the State Security Service, the Border Guards, the State Fire Service and the Prison Service serving in quarted units, requests to change the voting location
from 4 April 2025 until 15 May 2025	Local voting commissions are to be constituted; Foreign voting districts and polling stations abroad are to be announced
until 14 April 2025	Establishment of polling districts in medical facilities, social welfare facilities, penal institutions and detention centers, as well as in extramural departments of these establishments, dormitories and complexes of dormitories, as well as determination of their boundaries, consecutive number, as well as their locations
until 18 April 2025	Providing public information on the consecutive numbers and boundaries of polling districts, as well as location of district electoral commissions, including premises adapted to the needs of disabled persons, as well as the possibility of postal voting and proxy voting, Submission of requests to establish polling districts aboard Polish ships by captains of ships, Nomination of candidates to district electoral commission by agents of election committees
from 3 May 2025 until 17 May 2025 at 00:00 CEST	Broadcast without payment of the election programmes, prepared by election committees by means of public radio and television broadcasters
until 5 May 2025	Notice of the intention to vote by correspondence by disabled voters, including by means of overlays on ballot papers in Braille alphabet, and by voters who are 60 years of age or older on the day of voting, notice of the intention to exercise the right to free transportation to the polling station or free return transportation by disabled voters and by voters who are 60 years of age or older on the day of voting, in a commune where on the election day there is no communal passenger transport
until 8 May 2025	Providing public information on the organization of free transportation in communes, rural or urban-rural communes, on the day referred to in the art. 37f § 1 of the Electoral Code
until 9 May 2025	Submitting requests to draw up the power of attorney to vote by disabled voters and those who are 60 years of age or older on the day of voting

Date	Event description
until 13 May 2025	Submitting requests to be entered in the roll of voters in polling districts established abroad by voters staying abroad, Submitting requests to be entered in the roll of voters in polling districts established on Polish ships by voters present aboard those ships
until 15 May 2025	Information for disabled voters and voters who are 60 years of age or older on the day of voting, who have noticed of their intention to exercise their right to transportation to the polling station, about the timing of transportation on the voting day.
On 17 May 2025 at 00:00 CEST	The electoral campaign formally concludes; Election silence commences: no political broadcasts, social media posts, or issuing of new physical advertising materials is allowed
On 18 May 2025	The vote takes place between 7:00–21:00 CEST; Projected results of the exit poll are announced after 21:00 CEST
from 19 May 2025 until 29 May 2025	Submitting by voters requests to: issue the certificate confirming the right to vote in the place of residence on election day, change the voting location, Submitting by soldiers performing basic military service or those performing military training and policemen serving in quarted units, officers of the State Security Service, the Border Guards, the State Fire Service and the Prison Service serving in quarted units, requests to change the voting location
until 22 May 2025	Notice of the intention to vote by correspondence by disabled voters, including by means of overlays on ballot papers in Braille alphabet, and by voters who are 60 years of age or older on the day of voting
until 23 May 2025	Submitting requests to draw up the power of attorney to vote by disabled voters and those who are 60 years of age or older on the day of voting
until 27 May 2025	Notice of the intention to exercise the right to free transportation to the polling station or free return transportation by disabled voters and by voters who are 60 years of age or older on the day of voting, in a commune where on the election day there is no communal passenger transport, Submitting requests to be entered in the roll of voters in polling districts established abroad by voters staying abroad, Submitting requests to be entered in the roll of voters in polling districts established on Polish ships by voters present aboard those ships
until 29 May 2025	Information for disabled voters and voters who are 60 years of age or older on the day of voting, who have noticed of their intention to exercise their right to transportation to the polling station, about the timing of transportation on the voting day
On 30 May 2025 at 00:00 CEST	The electoral campaign formally concludes; Election silence commences: no political broadcasts, social media posts, or issuing of new physical advertising materials is allowed
On 1 June 2025	The vote takes place between 7:00–21:00 CEST; Projected results of the exit poll are announced after 21:00 CEST

== Opinion polls ==
=== First round ===
LOESS curve for the 2025 Polish presidential election, first round.

=== Second round ===
LOESS curve for the 2025 Polish presidential election, second round.

== Results ==
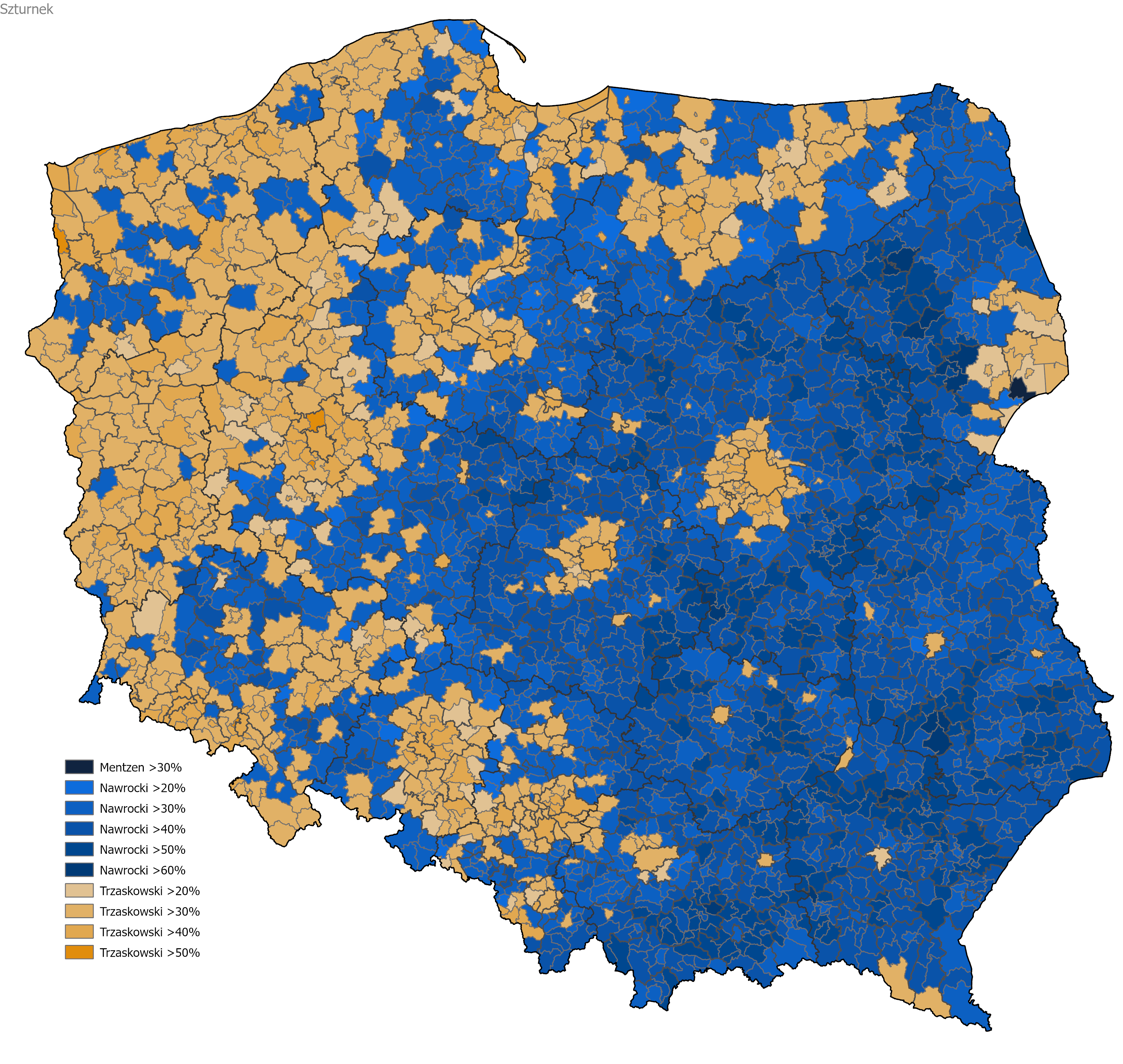

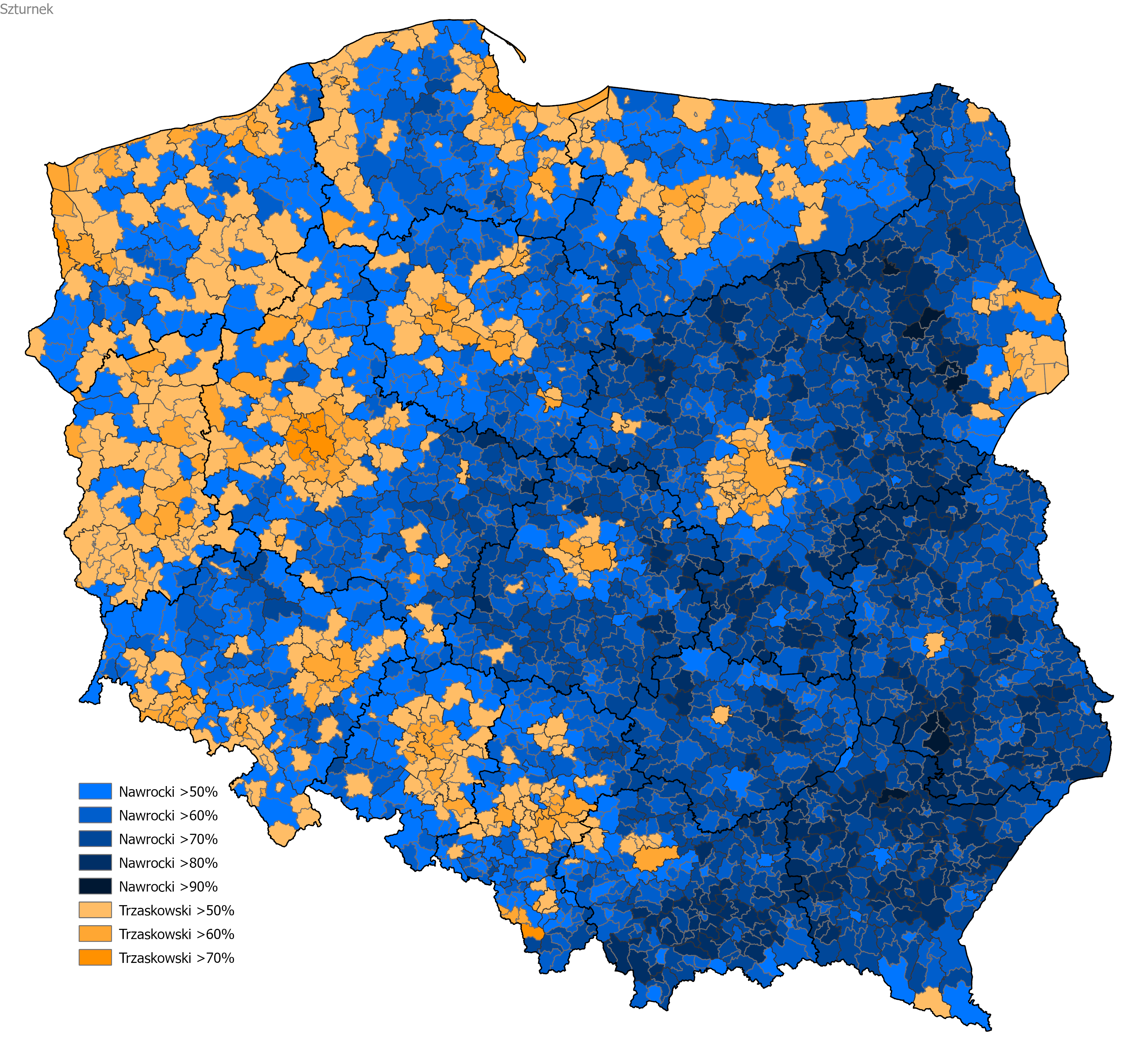

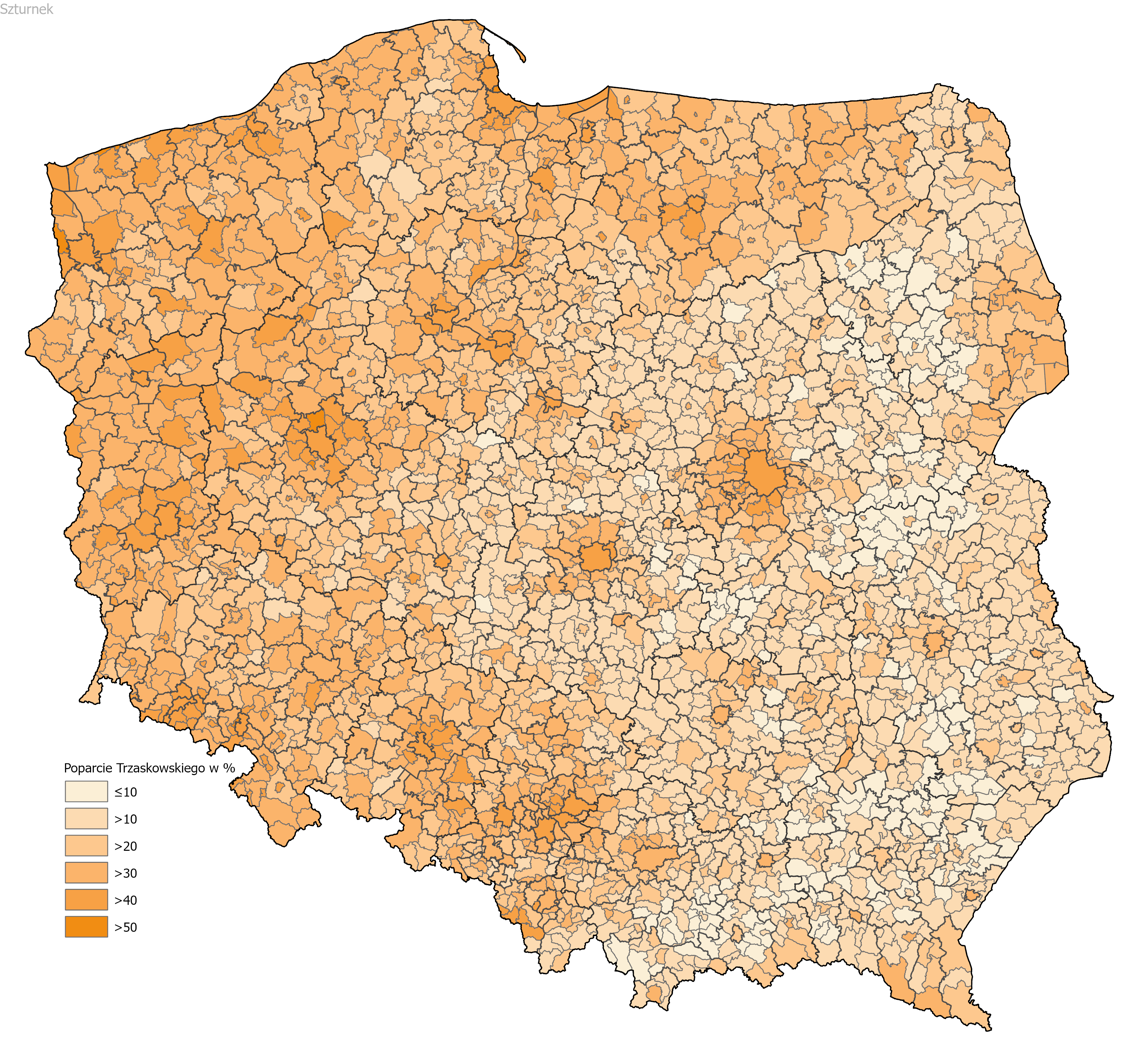

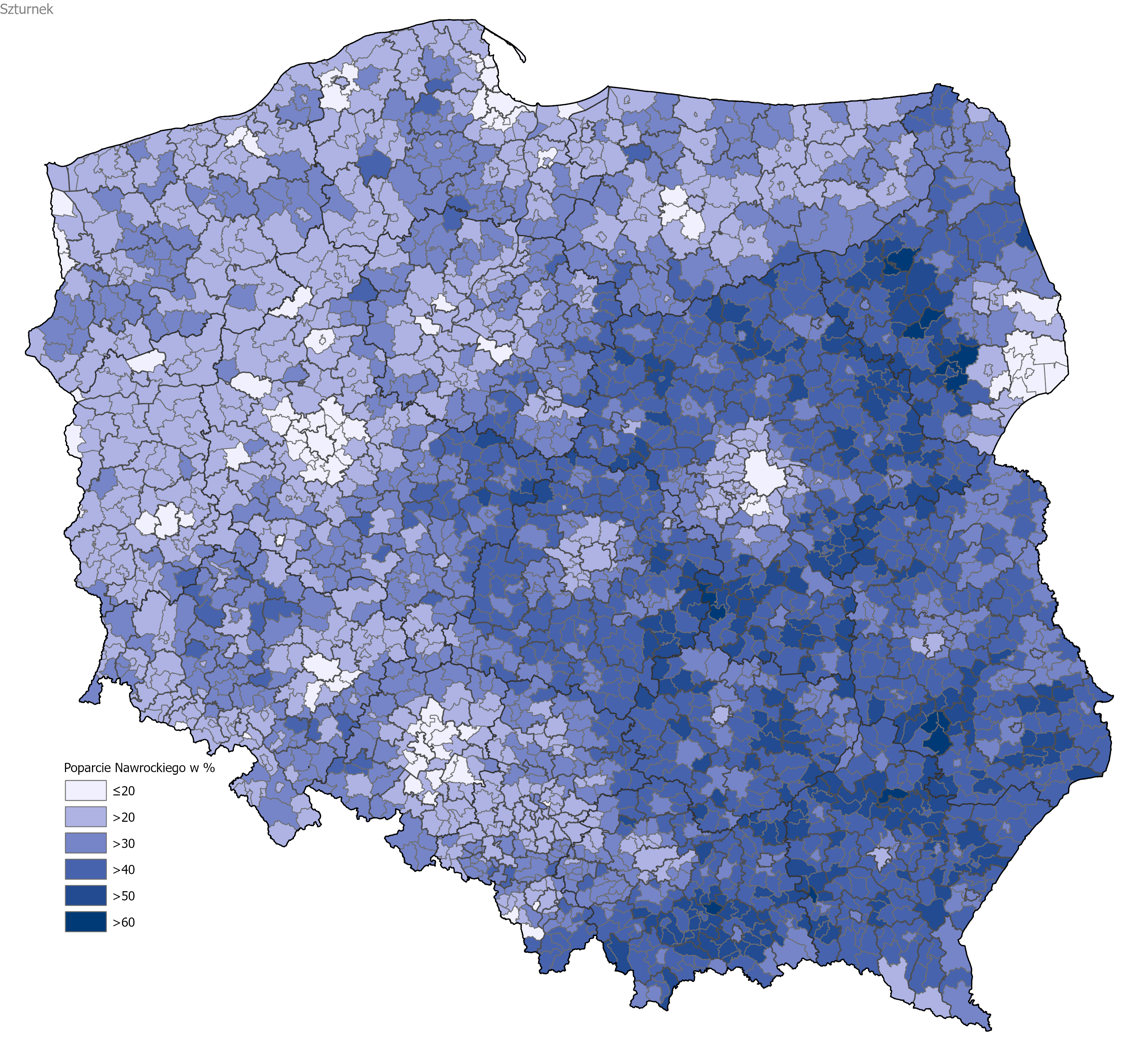

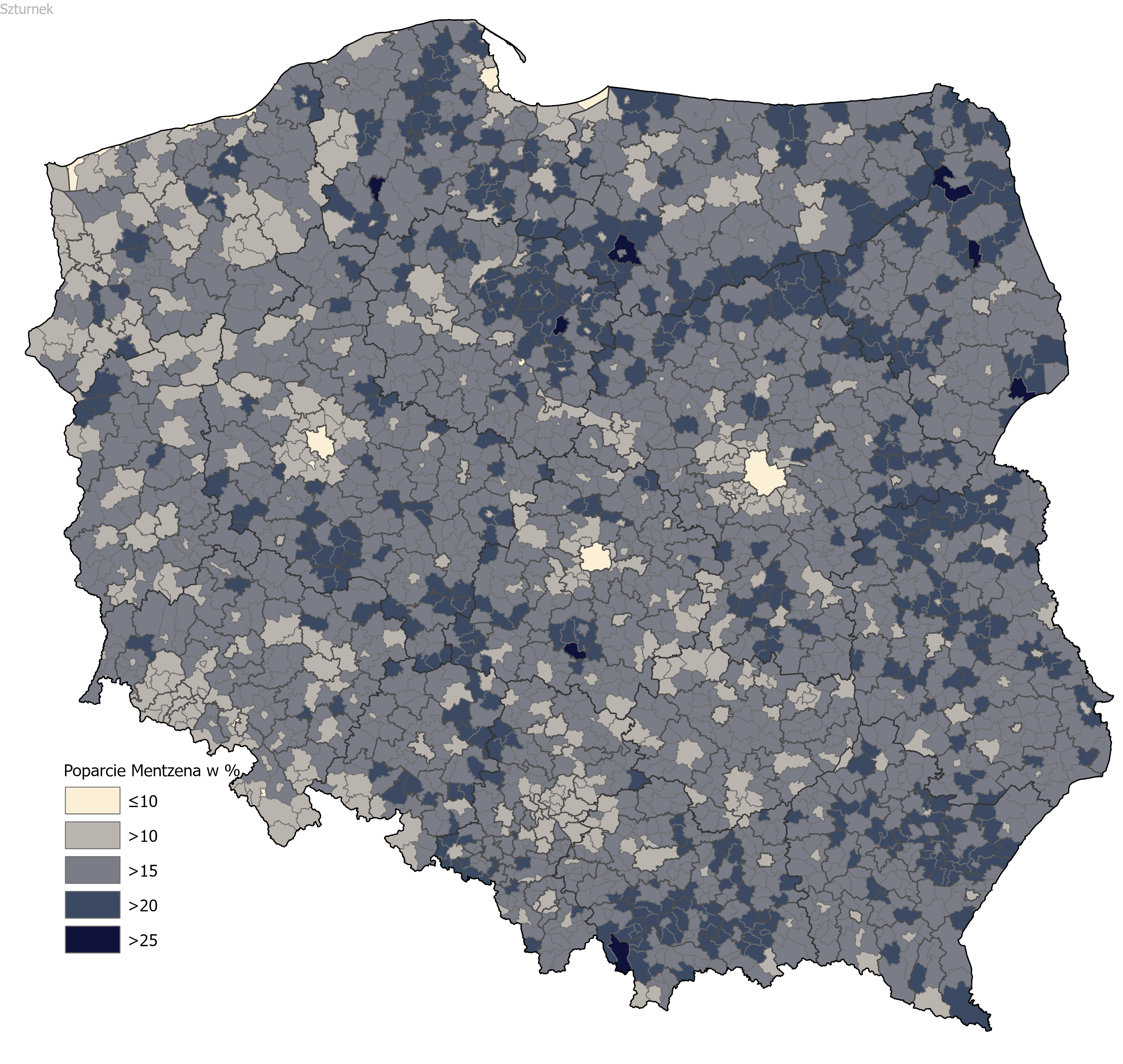

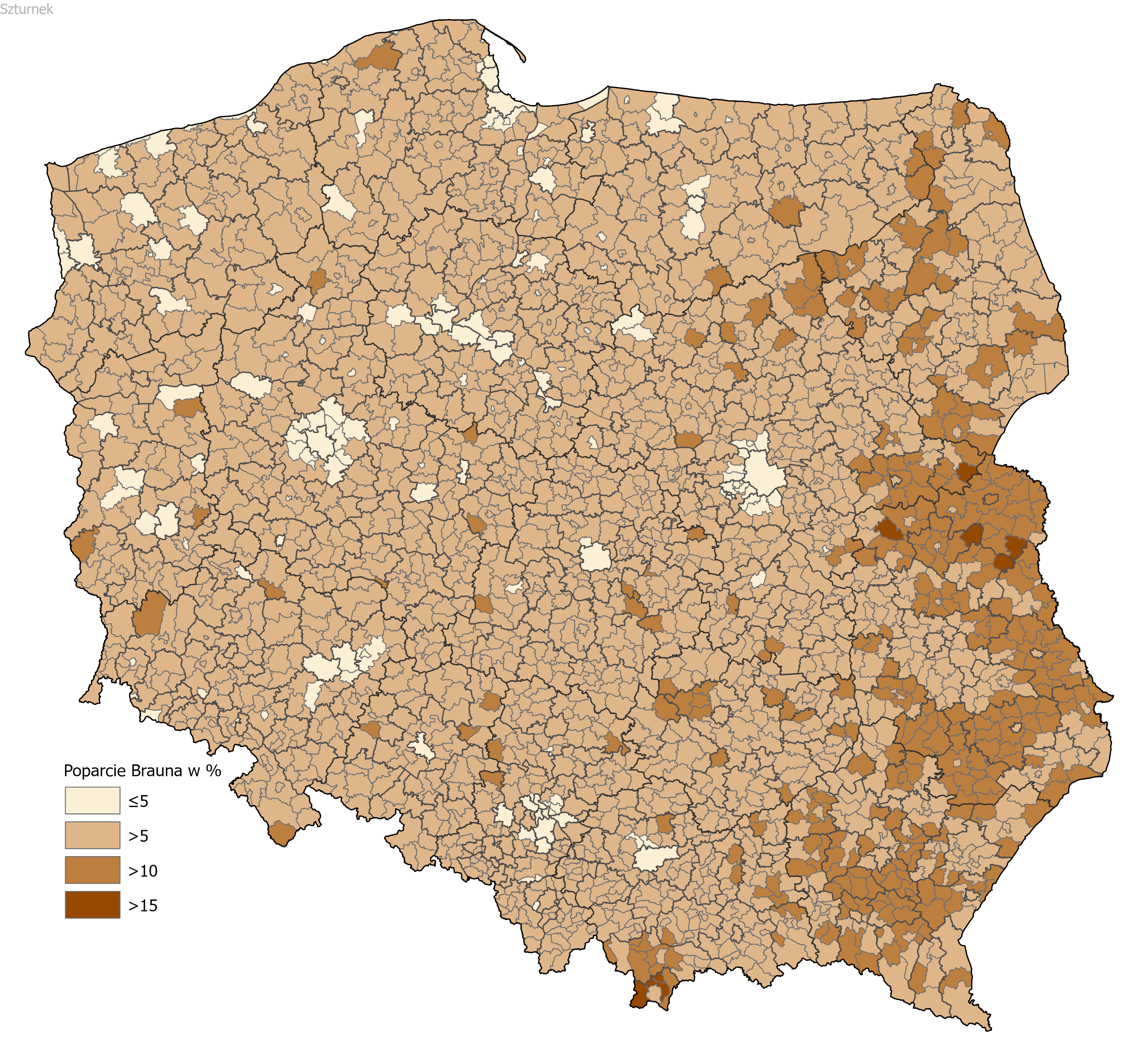

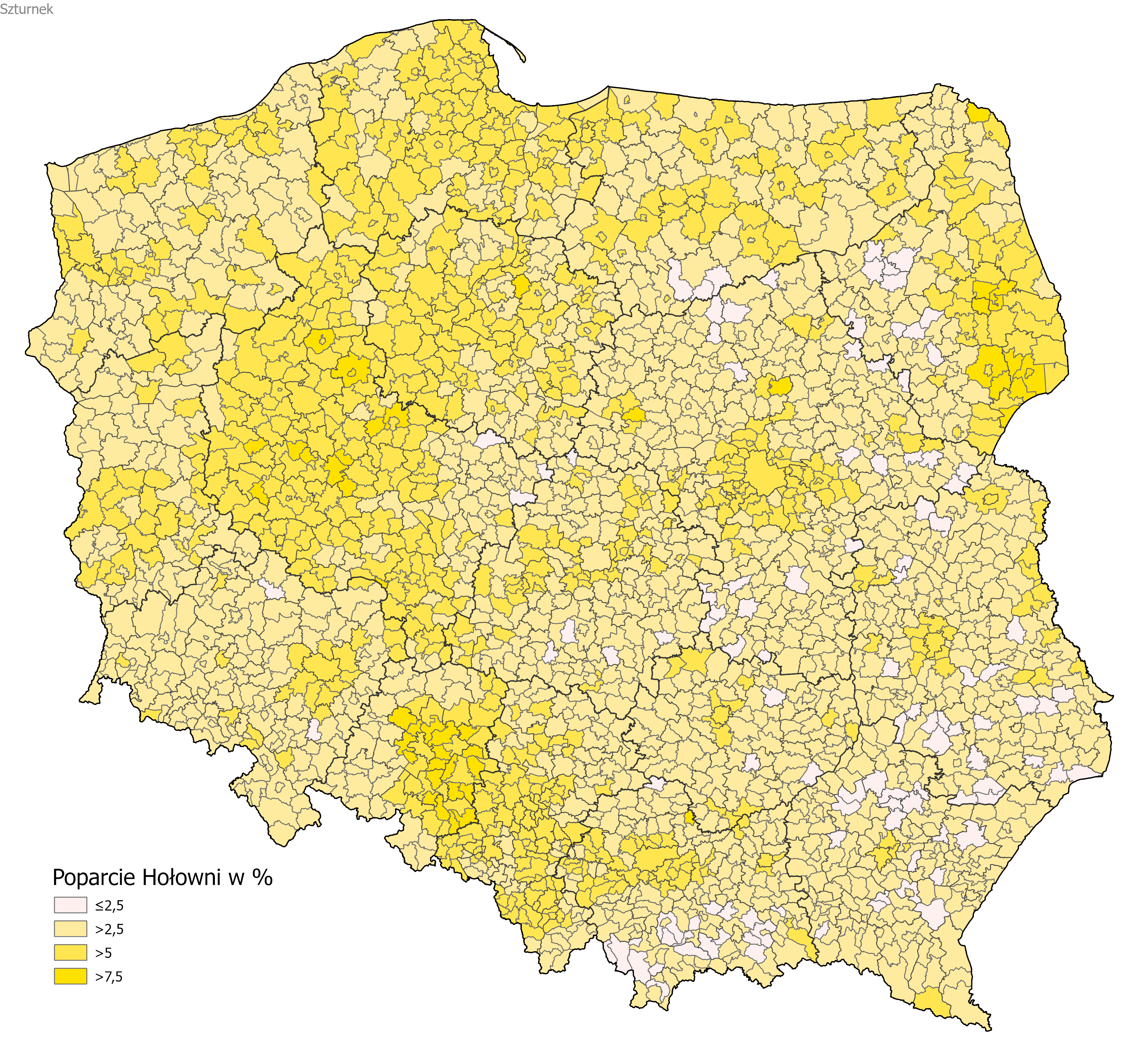

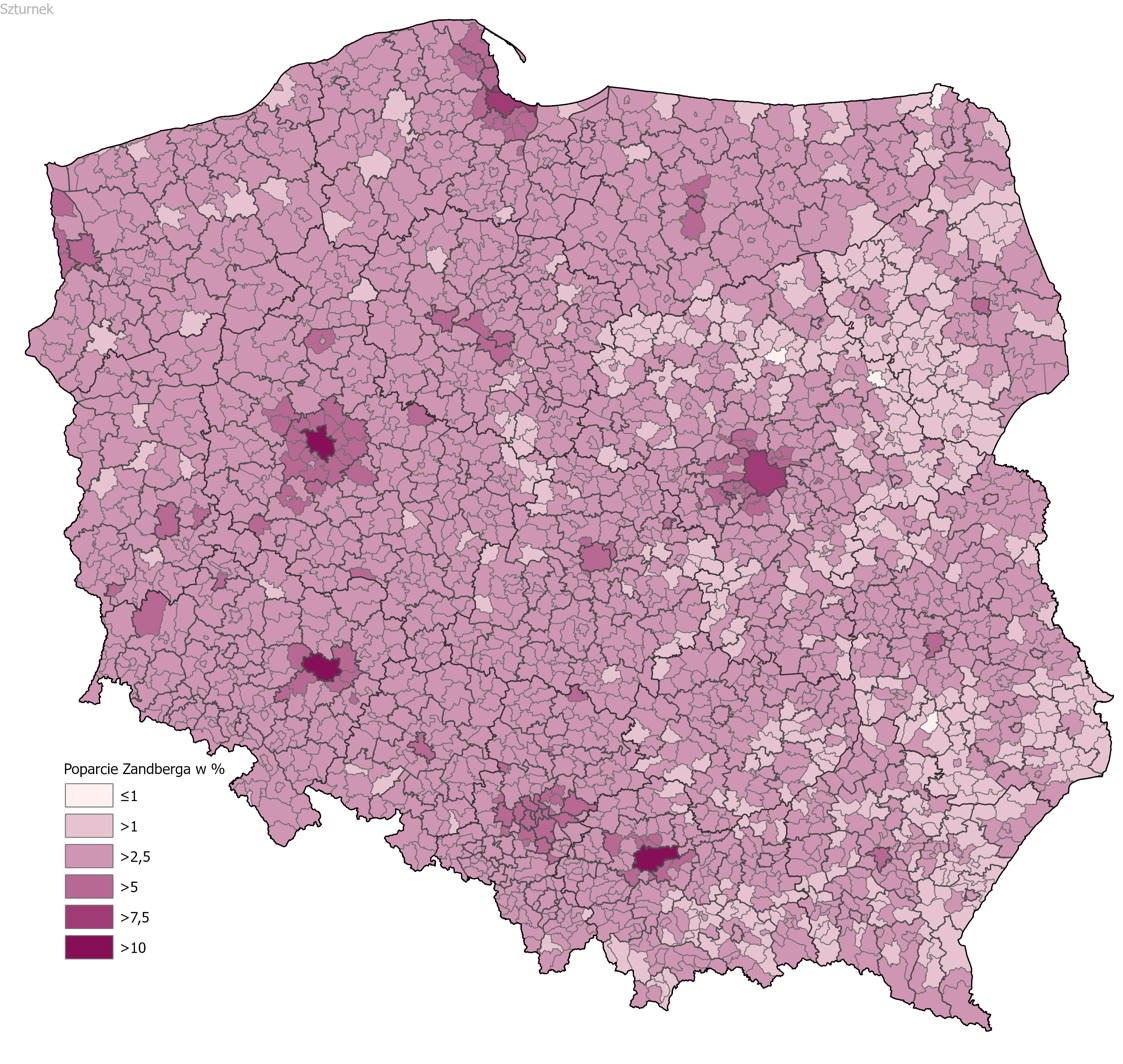

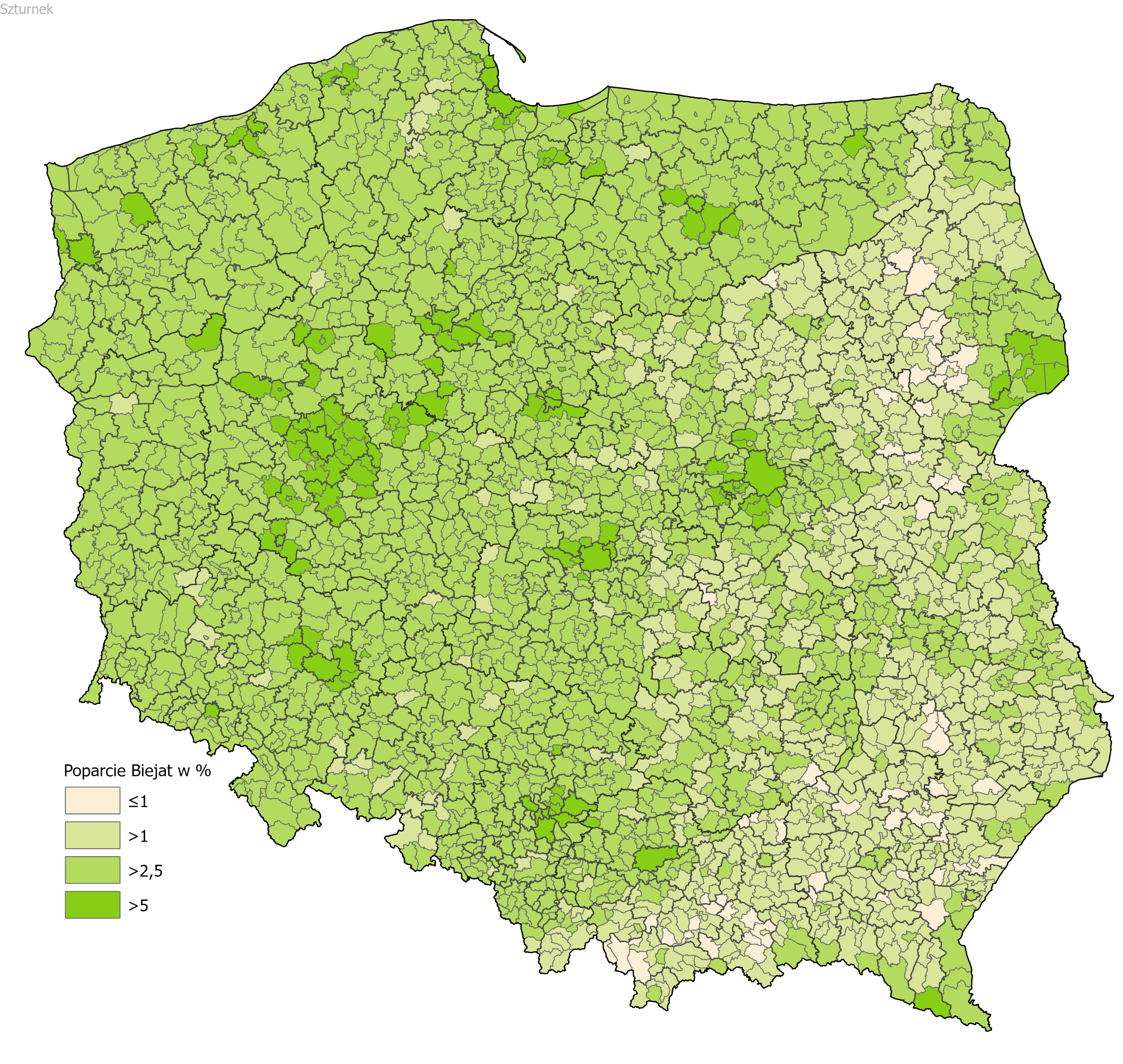

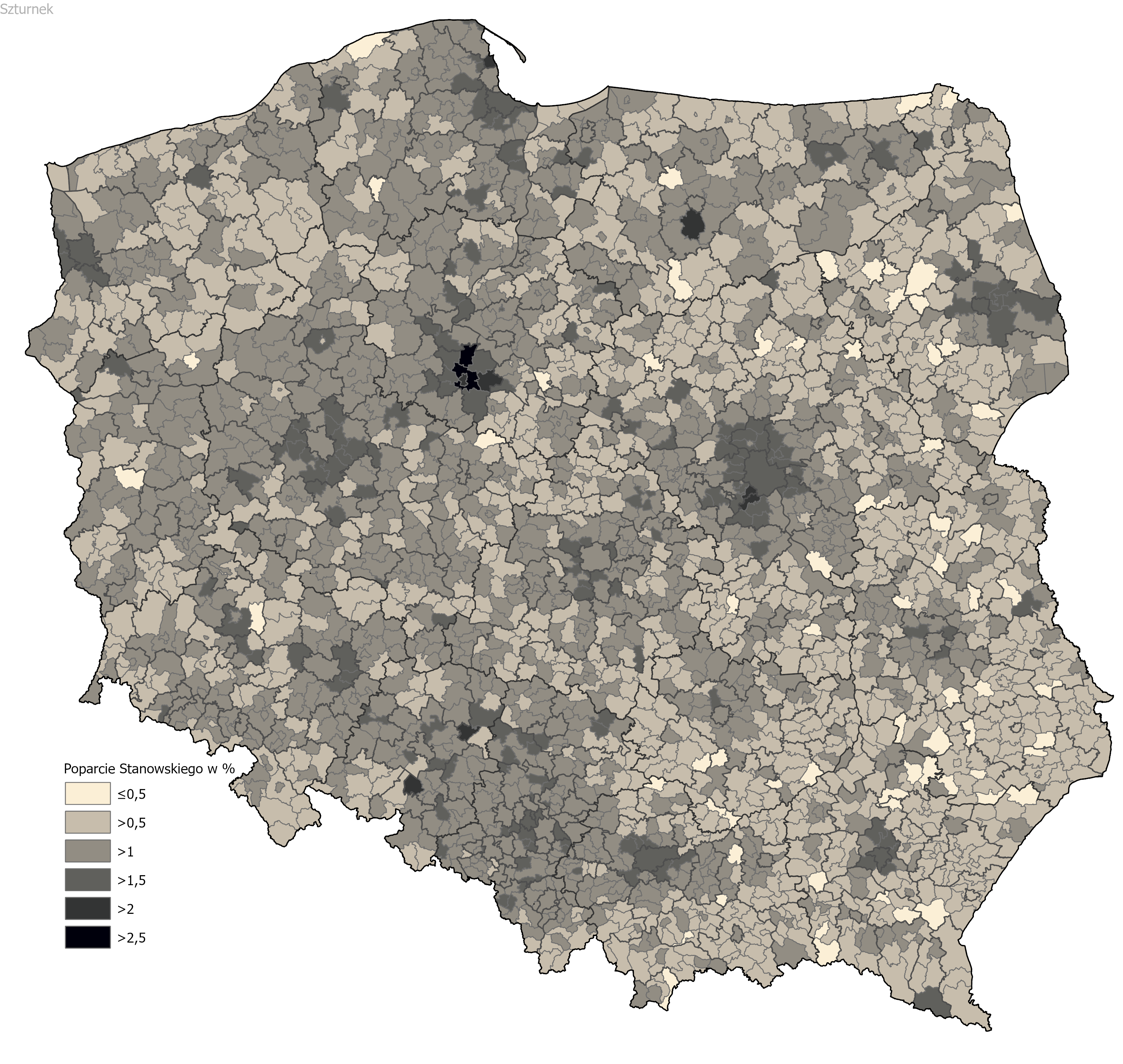

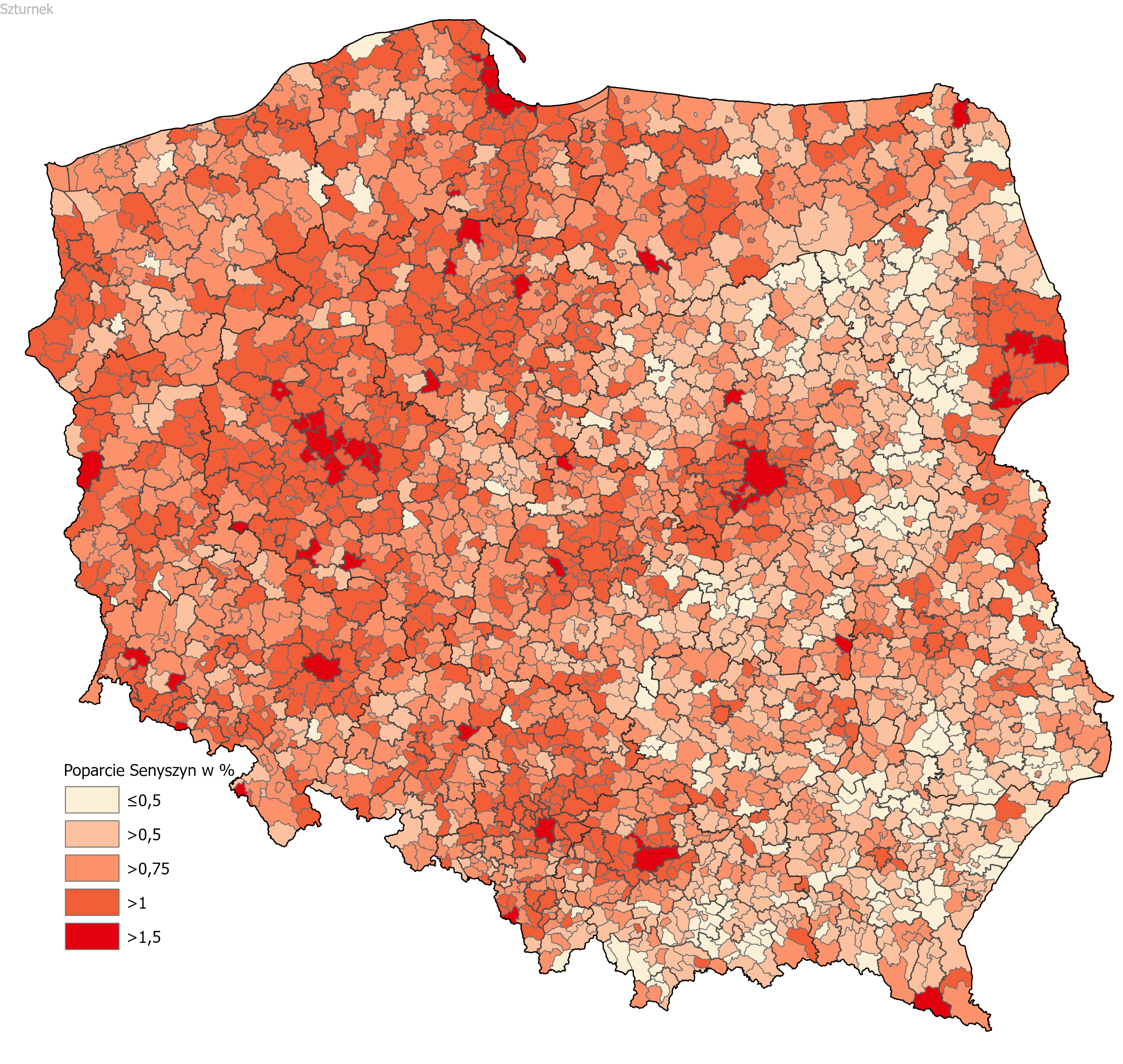

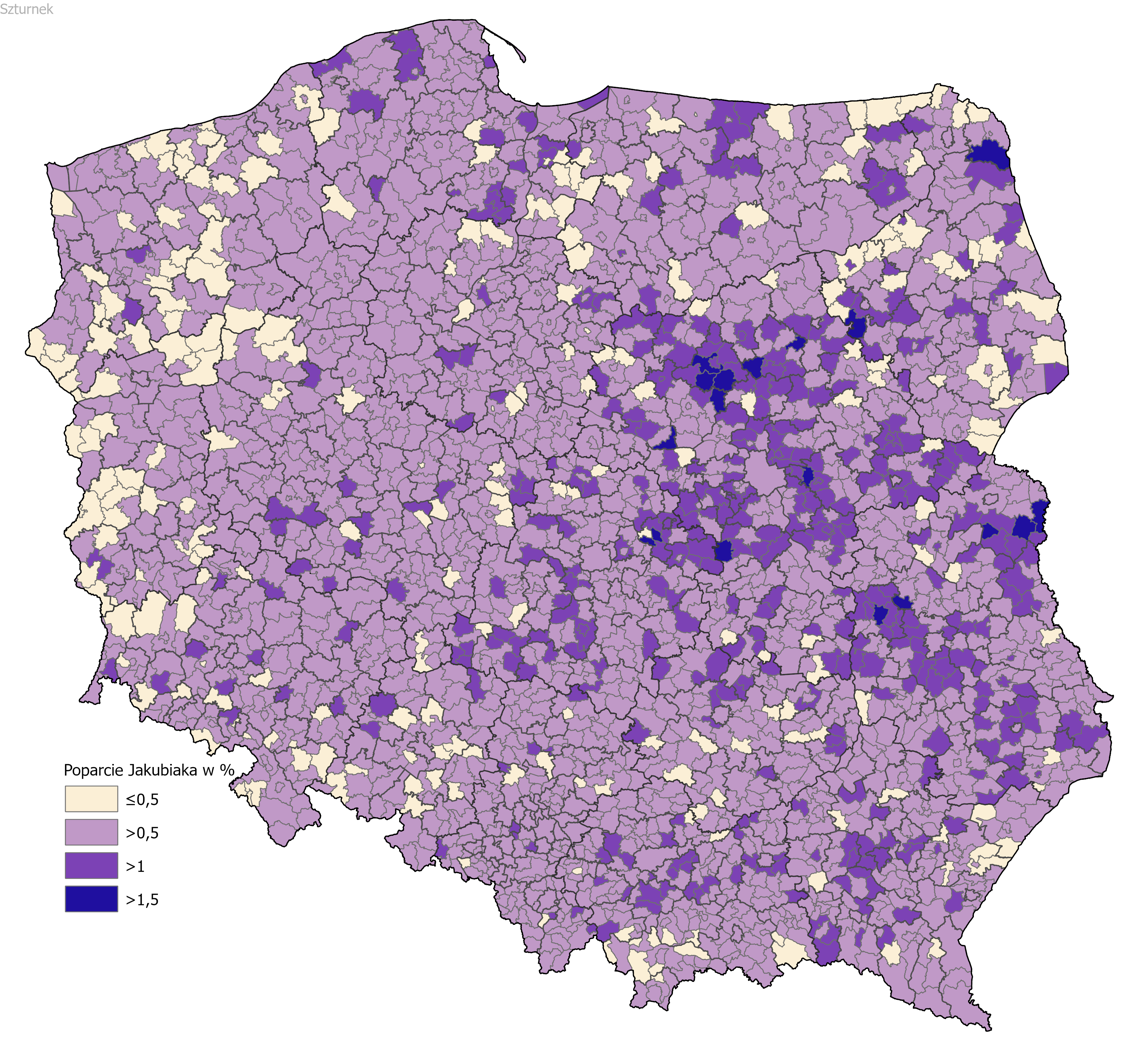

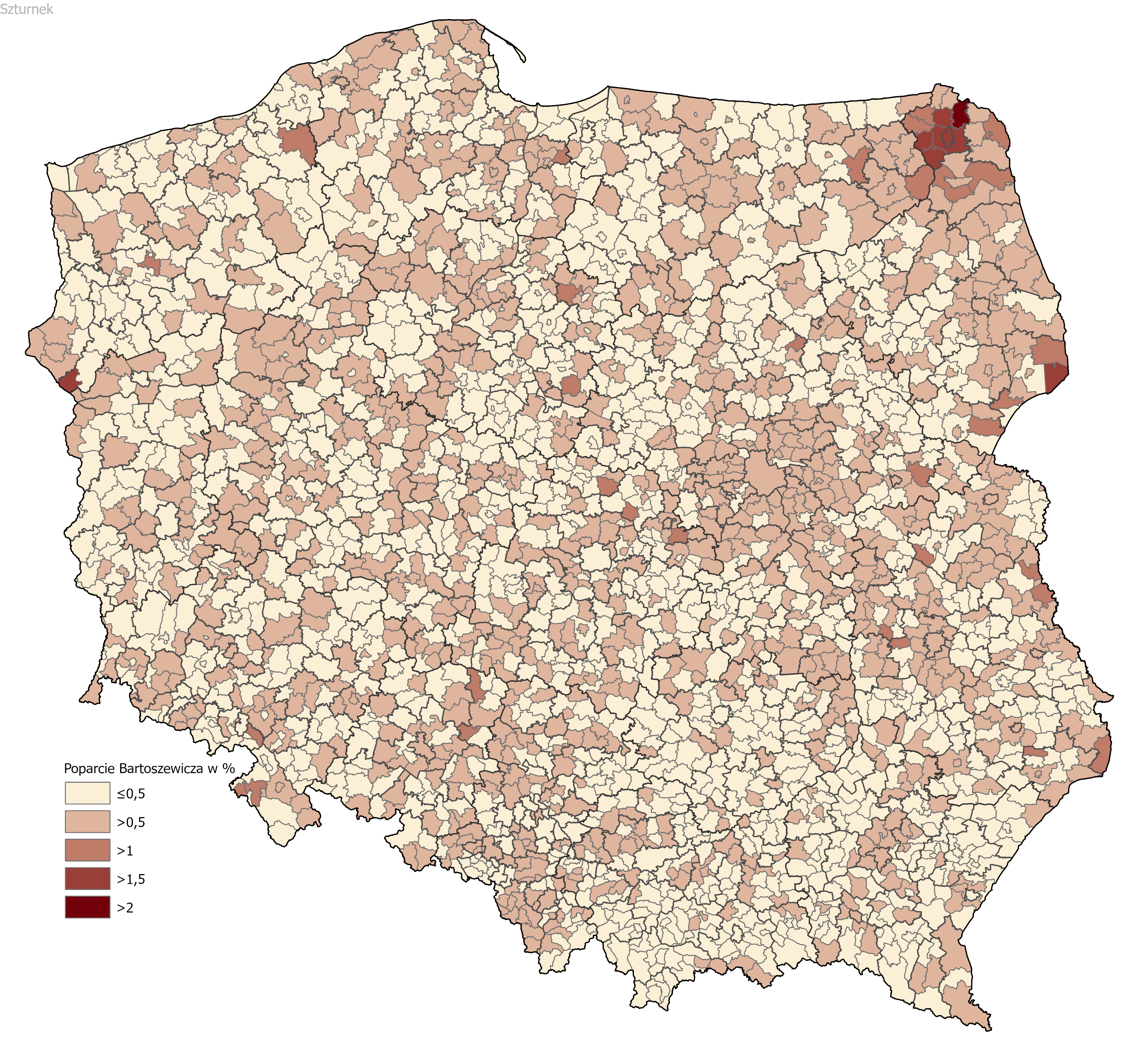

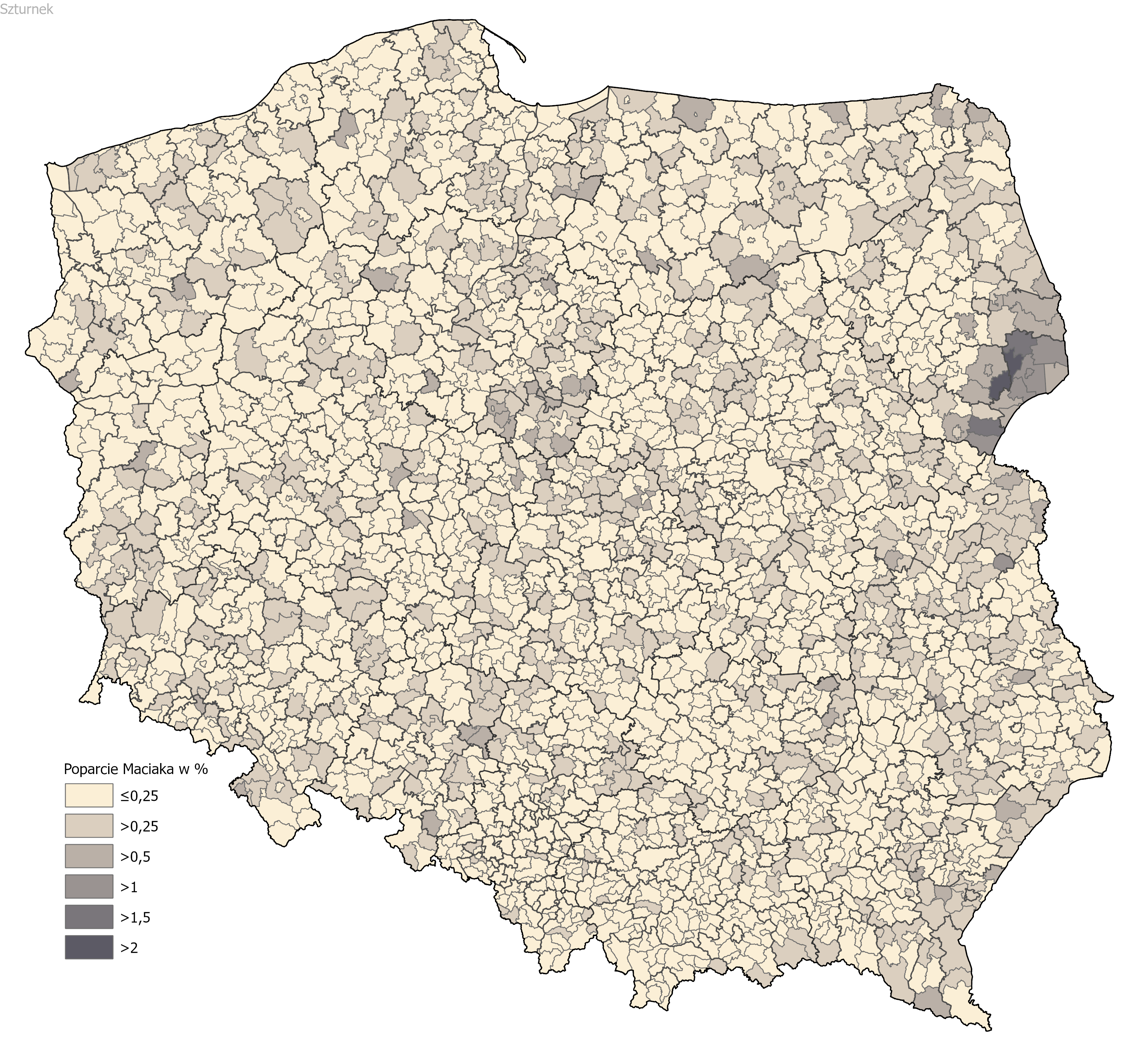

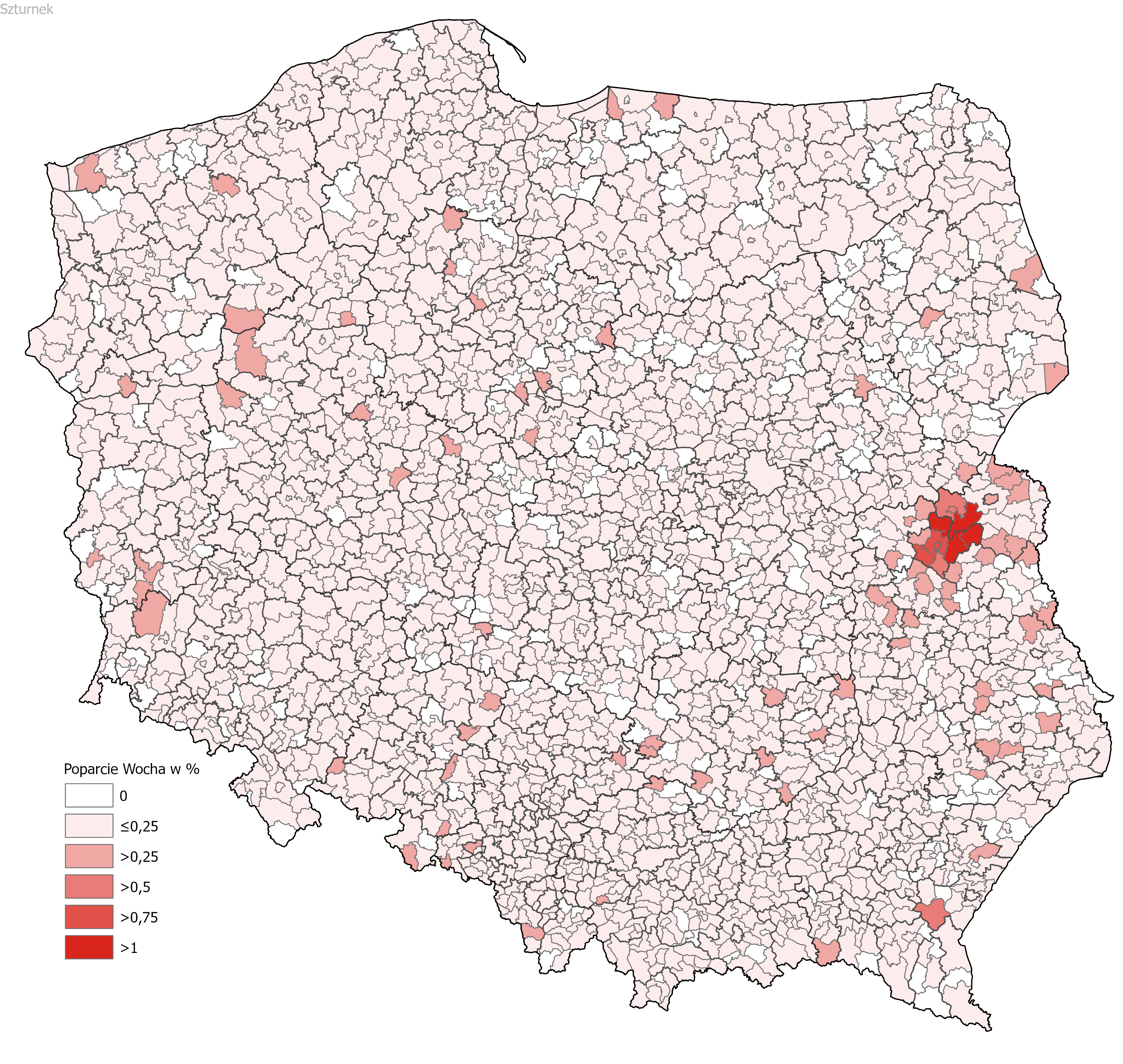

In the first round Trzaskowski came first with 31% of the vote, with Nawrocki coming in second with 30%, advancing to the second round. The right-wing candidates Nawrocki, Mentzen and Braun overperformed polls, received 30%, 15% and 6% respectively, finishing second, third and fourth. Hołownia and Biejat underperformed, coming fifth and seventh, the latter coming below her left-wing rival, Zandberg.

In the second round, according to an exit poll by Ipsos, Trzaskowski received 50.3% of the vote and Nawrocki 49.7%, however, the margin of 0.6% was within the margin of error. Shortly after the poll was released, Trzaskowski claimed victory giving a speech to supporters in Warsaw. A late poll, released by Ipsos at 23:00, later indicated that Nawrocki came first with 50.7% of the vote. After all votes were counted, Nawrocki's vote share ended with 10,606,877 votes (50.89%), against Trzaskowski's 10,237,286 (49.11%).

Candidate	Party	First round		Second round	
Candidate	Party	Votes	%	Votes	%
Karol Nawrocki	Independent (PiS)	5,790,804	29.54	10,606,877	50.89
Rafał Trzaskowski	Civic Coalition (PO)	6,147,797	31.36	10,237,286	49.11
Sławomir Mentzen	Confederation (New Hope)	2,902,448	14.81		
Grzegorz Braun	Polish Crown	1,242,917	6.34		
Szymon Hołownia	Third Way (Poland 2050)	978,901	4.99		
Adrian Zandberg	Partia Razem	952,832	4.86		
Magdalena Biejat	Independent (The Left)	829,361	4.23		
Krzysztof Stanowski	Independent	243,479	1.24		
Joanna Senyszyn	Independent (SLD)	214,198	1.09		
Marek Jakubiak	Free Republicans	150,698	0.77		
Artur Bartoszewicz	Independent	95,640	0.49		
Maciej Maciak	Independent (RDiP)	36,371	0.19		
Marek Woch	Bezpartyjni Samorządowcy	18,338	0.09		
Total		19,603,784	100.00	20,844,163	100.00
Valid votes		19,603,784	99.56	20,844,163	99.10
Invalid/blank votes		85,813	0.44	189,294	0.90
Total votes		19,689,597	100.00	21,033,457	100.00
Registered voters/turnout		29,252,340	67.31	29,363,722	71.63
Source: National Electoral Commission

Vote share
Second round
Nawrocki	50.89%
Trzaskowski	49.11%
First round
Trzaskowski	31.36%
Nawrocki	29.54%
Mentzen	14.81%
Braun	6.34%
Hołownia	4.99%
Zandberg	4.86%
Biejat	4.23%
Stanowski	1.24%
Senyszyn	1.09%
Others	1.54%

=== By voivodeship, abroad and ships ===
==== First round ====
Voivodeship	Trzaskowski KO		Nawrocki PiS		Mentzen Confederation		Braun KKP		Hołownia TD		Zandberg Razem		Biejat The Left		Stanowski Ind.		Senyszyn SLD		Jakubiak WR		Bartoszewicz Ind.		Maciak RDiP		Woch BS	
Voivodeship	Votes	%	Votes	%	Votes	%	Votes	%	Votes	%	Votes	%	Votes	%	Votes	%	Votes	%	Votes	%	Votes	%	Votes	%	Votes	%
Lower Silesian	519,319	36.52	362,779	25.51	192,749	13.56	77,921	5.48	66,643	4.69	80,976	5.70	66,320	4.66	17,430	1.23	17,342	1.22	2,717	0.68	6,727	0.47	2,717	0.19	1,249	0.09
Kuyavian-Pomeranian	339,442	35.63	251,323	26.38	141,713	14.87	49,699	5.22	49,495	5.19	41,052	4.31	44,077	4.63	12,039	1.26	10,304	1.08	2,087	0.67	4,296	0.45	2,087	0.22	879	0.09
Lublin	213,269	20.65	402,906	39.02	170,886	16.55	96,862	9.38	44,662	4.32	36,471	3.53	28,625	2.77	10,828	1.05	9,009	0.87	2,143	0.93	5,551	0.54	2,143	0.21	1,811	0.18
Lubusz	183,321	40.49	105,266	23.25	64,452	14.23	25,954	5.73	22,352	4.94	18,325	4.05	17,529	3.87	5,159	1.14	4,520	1.00	779	0.58	2,133	0.47	779	0.17	383	0.08
Łódź	377,192	30.27	400,817	32.17	172,049	13.81	75,641	6.07	58,080	4.66	56,702	4.55	56,981	4.57	15,248	1.22	13,629	1.09	2,391	0.82	6,133	0.49	2,391	0.19	1,043	0.08
Lesser Poland	445,859	24.41	643,054	35.21	295,847	16.20	120,425	6.59	89,634	4.91	99,552	5.45	63,052	3.45	22,519	1.23	18,951	1.04	2,845	0.82	8,090	0.44	2,845	0.16	1,592	0.09
Masovian	957,329	31.52	897,133	29.53	409,064	13.47	170,378	5.61	150,536	4.96	168,936	5.56	151,315	4.98	42,731	1.41	38,173	1.26	4,944	0.94	15,830	0.52	4,944	0.16	2,736	0.09
Opole	148,253	35.59	107,179	25.73	63,664	15.28	26,750	6.42	23,534	5.65	16,984	4.08	14,838	3.56	5,116	1.23	3,976	0.95	936	0.68	2,107	0.51	936	0.22	408	0.10
Subcarpathian	188,299	17.90	449,871	42.77	185,021	17.59	96,959	9.22	40,971	3.90	32,335	3.07	23,395	2.22	10,695	1.02	7,691	0.73	2,032	0.84	4,824	0.46	2,032	0.19	886	0.08
Podlaskie	130,372	23.31	199,325	35.64	95,487	17.07	43,059	7.70	32,337	5.78	20,277	3.63	16,375	2.93	6,547	1.17	4,967	0.89	1,781	0.80	3,810	0.68	1,781	0.32	399	0.07
Pomeranian	460,423	38.05	268,441	22.19	171,136	14.14	70,843	5.85	69,922	5.78	70,843	5.85	58,120	4.80	16,683	1.38	15,856	1.31	2,052	0.67	5,805	0.48	2,052	0.17	1,165	0.10
Silesian	722,469	33.37	599,900	27.71	322,362	14.89	122,604	5.66	115,554	5.34	104,539	4.83	93,143	4.30	29,062	1.34	23,672	1.09	3,948	0.70	10,551	0.49	3,948	0.18	2,090	0.10
Świętokrzyskie	140,322	23.73	236,151	39.94	85,188	14.41	36,923	7.94	24,745	4.18	19,749	3.34	18,283	3.09	6,035	1.02	4,996	0.84	1,121	0.80	2,626	0.44	1,121	0.19	496	0.08
Warmian-Masurian	215,229	34.56	168,158	27.00	96,346	15.47	37,144	5.96	31,510	5.06	25,111	4.03	26,577	4.27	7,187	1.15	5,983	0.96	1,250	0.74	3,188	0.51	1,250	0.20	562	0.09
Greater Poland	619,185	35.04	433,259	24.52	258,786	14.64	97,413	5.51	104,788	5.93	97,235	5.50	87,208	4.93	22,660	1.28	21,174	1.20	3,060	0.70	8,353	0.47	3,060	0.17	1,733	0.10
West Pomeranian	315,978	40.31	190,398	24.29	100,468	12.82	42,219	5.39	38,167	4.87	33,598	4.29	35,057	4.47	9,356	1.19	8,155	1.04	1,368	0.62	3,562	0.45	1,368	0.17	671	0.09
Abroad and ships	171,536	36.82	74,844	16.07	77,229	16.58	51,552	11.07	15,971	3.43	30,147	6.47	28,466	6.11	4,184	0.90	5,800	1.24	2,932	0.63	2,054	0.44	917	0.20	235	0.05
Poland	6,147,797	31.36	5,790,804	29.54	2,902,448	14.81	1,242,917	6.34	962,930	4.99	952,832	4.86	829,361	4.23	243,479	1.24	214,198	1.09	150,698	0.77	95,640	0.49	36,371	0.19	18,338	0.09
Source: National Electoral Commission

==== Second round ====
Voivodeship	Nawrocki PiS		Trzaskowski KO	
Voivodeship	Votes	%	Votes	%
Lower Silesian	673,218	44.19	850,305	55.81
Kuyavian-Pomeranian	470,660	46.58	539,860	53.42
Lublin	720,119	66.54	362,053	33.46
Lubusz	201,982	41.78	281,477	58.22
Łódź	701,859	53.20	617,350	46.80
Lesser Poland	1,132,733	58.87	791,494	41.13
Masovian	1,585,019	49.72	1,602,996	50.28
Opole	210,321	47.02	236,992	52.98
Subcarpathian	780,429	71.02	318,485	28.98
Podlaskie	357,847	61.39	225,062	38.61
Pomeranian	521,725	40.87	754,823	59.13
Silesian	1,111,205	48.66	1,172,343	51.34
Świętokrzyskie	401,863	63.61	229,895	36.39
Warmian-Masurian	320,797	48.29	343,483	51.71
Greater Poland	837,129	44.83	1,030,175	55.17
West Pomeranian	359,267	41.97	496,666	58.03
Abroad and ships	220,704	36.51	383,827	63.49
Poland	10,606,877	50.89	10,237,286	49.11
Source: National Electoral Commission

=== Electorate demographics ===
2nd Ipsos late polls for the first (Note: The average margin of error for the Ipsos poll is approximately 0.12 percentage points.) and second rounds. Shifts calculated from 2020 Ipsos late poll
Demographic	Second round			First round												
Demographic	Nawrocki PiS	Trzaskowski KO	Shift for PiS from 2020	Trzaskowski KO	Nawrocki PiS	Mentzen KWiN	Braun KKP	Hołownia TD	Zandberg Razem	Biejat The Left	Stanowski Ind.	Senyszyn SLD	Jakubiak WR	Bartoszewicz Ind.	Maciak RDiP	Woch BS
Total vote	50.89	49.11	-0.14	31.36	29.54	14.81	6.34	4.99	4.86	4.23	1.24	1.09	0.77	0.49	0.19	0.09
Late poll results	51.0	49.0	=0.0	31.2	29.7	14.5	6.3	4.9	4.8	4.1	1.3	1.4	0.8	0.5	0.4	0.1
Sex
Men	55.5	44.5	+3.6	28.0	28.6	19.7	7.6	4.4	4.0	2.4	1.8	1.3	1.0	0.6	0.4	0.2
Women	47.2	52.8	-2.5	34.1	30.8	9.8	5.1	5.3	5.6	5.6	0.9	1.4	0.5	0.4	0.4	0.1
Age
18–29 years old	53.2	46.8	+16.9	13.0	11.1	34.8	5.3	4.3	18.7	5.3	2.5	3.3	0.8	0.5	0.3	0.1
30–39 years old	54.0	46.0	+8.7	21.6	19.5	24.8	9.9	6.9	5.2	6.1	2.4	1.7	0.9	0.5	0.4	0.1
40–49 years old	47.9	52.1	+2.3	34.2	26.9	11.2	8.6	7.1	2.2	5.0	1.5	1.3	0.8	0.6	0.4	0.2
50–59 years old	49.4	50.6	-10.3	36.8	36.3	7.7	6.1	4.9	1.6	3.5	0.7	0.6	0.8	0.6	0.3	0.1
60 and older	51.0	49.0	-11.5	42.5	45.3	2.6	2.9	2.4	0.5	1.7	0.2	0.5	0.6	0.4	0.3	0.1
Education
Elementary	73.0	27.0	-4.3	16.0	52.3	12.7	5.6	2.5	4.7	2.4	1.1	1.1	0.6	0.5	0.4	0.1
Vocational	69.8	30.2	-5.2	22.1	49.2	13.2	7.4	3.0	1.2	1.7	0.4	0.6	0.4	0.4	0.3	0.1
Secondary	53.9	46.1	+3.0	28.9	29.8	17.0	6.9	4.1	5.4	3.3	1.4	1.3	0.8	0.5	0.4	0.2
Higher	39.0	61.0	+4.1	38.6	19.9	12.8	5.3	6.6	5.7	5.9	1.6	1.8	0.9	0.5	0.3	0.1
Agglomeration
Rural	64.2	35.8	+0.4	21.7	38.1	17.4	7.7	4.7	3.2	2.9	1.1	1.1	0.9	0.6	0.4	0.2
<50,000 pop.	48.7	51.3	+1.8	33.9	29.5	13.6	6.5	4.6	4.3	3.6	1.1	1.3	0.6	0.6	0.3	0.1
51,000 – 200,000 pop.	42.9	57.1	-6.7	38.0	23.9	13.2	5.6	5.2	4.9	4.6	1.9	1.2	0.7	0.4	0.3	0.1
201,000 – 500,000 pop.	34.7	65.3	-4.0	42.9	18.7	11.3	3.8	6.1	6.6	5.8	1.7	1.8	0.5	0.5	0.2	0.1
>500,000 pop.	33.2	66.8	-1.0	40.7	17.6	10.8	3.9	5.1	9.7	6.8	1.5	2.1	0.9	0.3	0.5	0.1
Occupation
Company owner	44.6	55.4	+10.5	37.5	17.3	19.9	7.8	5.8	2.7	4.0	1.9	1.1	1.0	0.5	0.3	0.2
Manager/expert	36.3	63.7	+3.7	37.4	16.9	15.0	5.0	7.2	5.2	6.7	2.2	2.1	1.1	0.7	0.4	0.1
Admin/services	48.3	51.7	+3.6	30.2	24.3	15.7	6.7	6.3	6.2	5.8	1.5	1.7	0.6	0.5	0.3	0.2
Farmer	80.1	19.9	-1.3	12.2	52.4	14.2	10.4	3.5	1.1	1.5	0.9	1.2	1.3	0.7	0.5	0.1
Worker	69.3	30.7	+2.9	17.4	36.7	21.8	10.8	4.0	2.6	2.3	1.7	0.8	0.7	0.6	0.3	0.3
Student	44.3	55.7	+14.2	16.1	10.2	26.3	4.0	4.9	25.2	5.8	1.9	4.0	0.8	0.3	0.4	0.1
Unemployed	64.3	35.7	-1.1	19.6	33.9	18.4	8.7	6.0	5.5	3.6	1.0	1.4	0.5	0.4	0.6	0.4
Retired	51.6	48.4	-12.5	42.3	45.7	2.5	2.9	2.4	0.6	1.7	0.3	0.3	0.4	0.5	0.3	0.1
Other	54.8	45.2	+4.2	24.2	28.7	18.9	8.7	5.3	5.0	4.7	1.3	1.5	0.8	0.4	0.4	0.1
Second round presidential vote in 2020 (Note: Shift column denotes shifts from second round presidential vote in 2015)
Duda	93.3	6.7	+2.2	2.7	64.7	16.3	8.4	2.1	1.1	1.1	1.0	0.5	1.2	0.6	0.1	0.2
Trzaskowski	4.0	96.0	-0.4	71.1	1.0	3.9	1.1	6.7	5.9	6.8	1.0	1.7	0.2	0.2	0.3	0.1
Didn't vote	55.5	44.5	+25.4	12.8	10.8	33.7	10.5	5.8	15.1	4.0	2.4	2.4	0.9	0.7	0.8	0.1
Don't remember	55.0	45.0	+15.8	16.6	18.8	25.4	12.6	8.5	4.4	5.3	2.4	2.6	1.0	1.2	0.8	0.4
Sejm vote in 2023 (Note: Shift column denotes shifts from 2019 Sejm vote)
BS	73.1	26.9	–	10.8	18.7	15.1	15.8	4.6	7.5	5.2	6.0	3.5	3.8	6.5	1.4	1.1
TD	20.9	79.1	-8.5	22.6	4.0	10.8	2.8	36.6	8.7	7.3	2.7	2.0	0.9	0.6	0.7	0.3
NL	10.8	89.2	+2.5	17.9	2.7	3.9	2.4	2.6	33.1	29.9	1.0	5.1	0.5	0.4	0.3	0.1
PiS	97.9	2.1	+1.0	1.4	83.3	6.9	4.4	0.9	0.5	0.5	0.6	0.2	0.9	0.3	0.1	0.0
Confederation	89.3	10.7	+49.3	2.1	4.7	66.6	21.1	0.6	1.1	0.3	1.2	0.5	0.9	0.6	0.3	0.0
KO	4.1	95.9	+2.3	81.7	1.1	3.0	0.9	3.0	3.4	4.1	0.8	1.4	0.1	0.1	0.3	0.1
PJJ	75.9	24.1	–	9.0	27.6	18.8	26.8	2.5	2.4	0.2	3.6	3.2	3.5	0.9	1.2	0.3
Other parties	55.6	44.4	+38.8	10.4	17.1	9.7	18.7	3.9	13.3	5.3	6.9	5.6	2.0	2.2	3.3	1.6
Didn't vote	56.9	43.1	+18.6	15.5	15.1	29.5	12.0	3.7	11.9	3.6	3.4	2.2	1.3	0.7	1.0	0.1
Don't remember	54.1	45.9	+14.0	20.2	20.3	18.0	12.6	5.2	8.4	6.3	2.6	2.9	1.3	1.5	0.3	0.4
Transfer of electorates from the first round of the election
Electorates transferred from candidates in column to candidate in row		Didn't vote	Don't remember	Trzaskowski KO	Nawrocki PiS	Mentzen KWiN	Braun KKP	Hołownia TD	Zandberg Razem	Biejat The Left	Stanowski Ind.	Senyszyn SLD	Jakubiak WR	Bartoszewicz Ind.	Maciak RDiP	Woch BS
Karol Nawrocki		48.6	57.2	1.2	99.3	87.2	92.6	14.6	16.5	11.7	52.1	19.3	89.5	69.6	70.7	53.8
Rafał Trzaskowski		51.4	42.8	98.8	0.7	12.8	7.4	85.4	83.5	88.3	47.9	80.7	10.5	30.4	29.3	46.2
Shift for PiS candidate from 2020		-1.2	+0.1	+0.5	+0.2	+34.9	–	-0.4	–	-4.3	–	–	+23.6	–	–	–

== Turnout ==
=== Overview ===
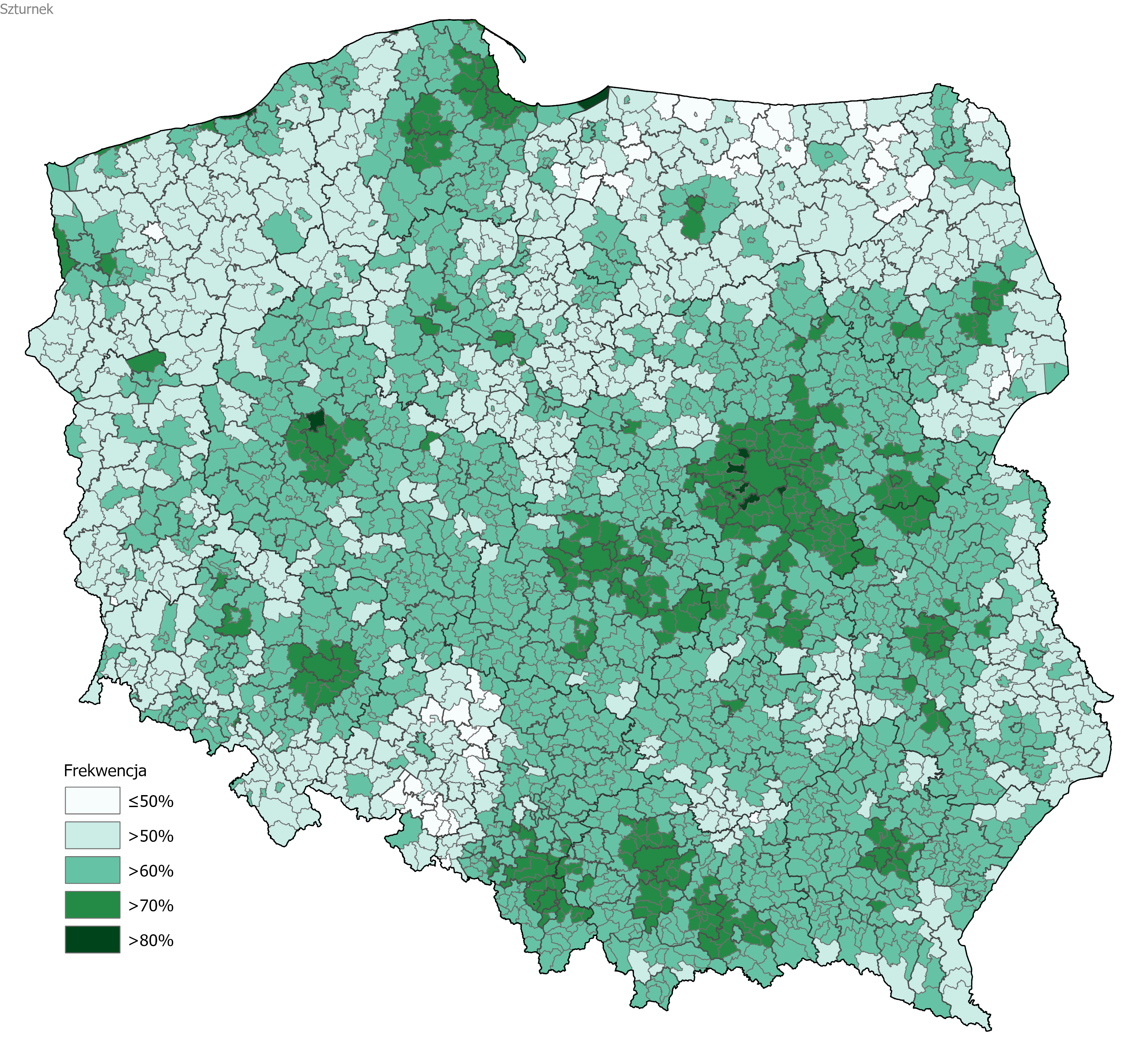
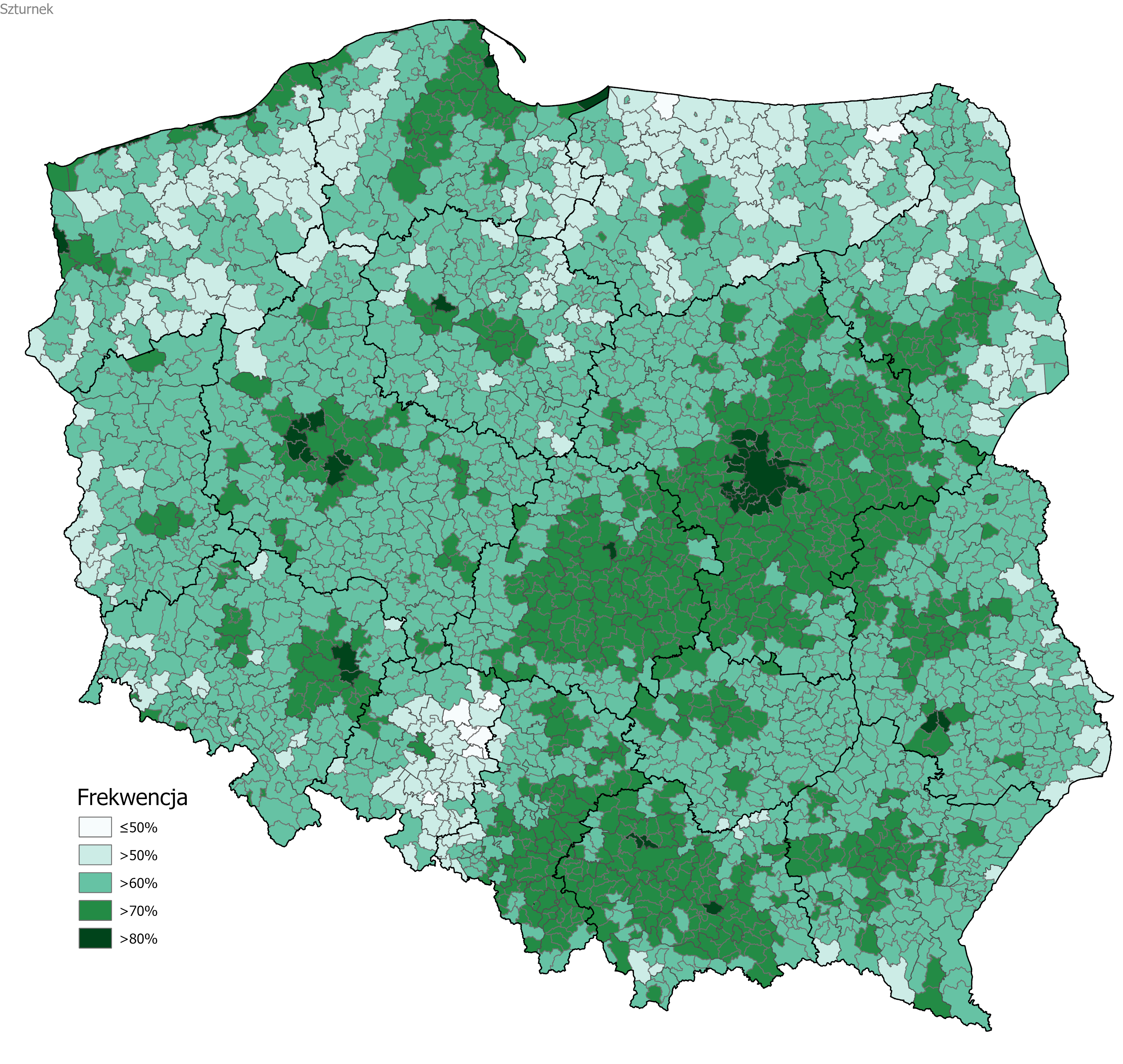

Increase or decrease in turnout relative to 2020.

Time (CEST)	First round	Second round
12:00	20.28% (▼4.45pp)	24.83% (▲0.10pp)
17:00	50.69% (▲1.41pp)	54.91% (▲2.81pp)
Final	67.31% (▲2.80pp)	71.63% (▲3.45pp)
Agglomeration	First round	Second round
Urban areas	68.34% (▲2.40pp)	72.84% (▲3.80pp)
Rural areas	64.78% (▲3.02pp)	69.04% (▲2.64pp)
Amplitudes	First round	Second round
Highest turnout gmina	Krynica Morska (83.51%)	Krynica Morska (88.38%)
Lowest turnout gmina	Zębowice (41.61%)	Lasowice Wielkie (47.67%)
Source: National Electoral Commission

=== First round ===
==== Voter turnout by voivodeships ====
Voivodeship	Number of eligible voters	Number of valid ballots	Percentage
Lower Silesian	2,179,515	1,428,270	65.53
Kuyavian-Pomeranian	1,508,883	956,844	63.41
Lublin	1,581,156	1,036,946	65.58
Lubusz	735,151	454,969	61.89
Łódź	1,834,708	1,251,695	68.22
Lesser Poland	2,630,055	1,833,457	69.71
Masovian	4,156,733	3,050,909	73.40
Opole	726,177	418,575	57.64
Subcarpathian	1,609,302	1,056,009	65.62
Podlaskie	874,307	561,833	64.26
Pomeranian	1,759,968	1,215,424	69.06
Silesian	3,283,581	2,174,449	66.22
Świętokrzyskie	929,724	593,965	63.89
Warmian-Masurian	1,035,537	626,061	60.46
Greater Poland	2,641,294	1,774,671	67.19
West Pomeranian	1,241,872	787,715	63.43
Poland	28,727,963	19,221,792	66.91
Source: National Electoral Commission

==== Voter turnout in large cities (with populations over 250,000) ====
City	Number of eligible voters	Number of valid ballots	Percentage
Wrocław	504,001	371,481	73.99
Poznań	407,035	303,699	74.86
Warszawa	1,379,227	1,089,680	79.29
Szczecin	280,501	193,668	69.33
Kraków	621,058	465,148	75.14
Łódź	491,800	346,245	70.67
Bydgoszcz	241,846	166,301	69.01
Białystok	213,477	150,207	70.65
Gdańsk	372,134	280,994	75.79
Lublin	253,867	178,695	70.63
Total	4,764,946	3,546,118	74.42
Source: National Electoral Commission

==== Voter turnout by location ====
Location	Number of eligible voters	Number of valid ballots	Percentage
City	17,169,697	11,734,470	68.34
Village	11,558,266	7,487,322	64.78
Abroad	524,204	467,633	89.21
Ships	173	172	99.42
Total	29,252,340	19,689,597	67.31
Source: National Electoral Commission

=== Second round ===
==== Voter turnout by voivodeships ====
Voivodeship	Number of eligible voters	Number of valid ballots	Percentage
Lower Silesian	2,177,407	1,537,859	70.63
Kuyavian-Pomeranian	1,501,949	1,019,510	67.88
Lublin	1,567,771	1,091,630	69.63
Lubusz	731,055	487,694	66.71
Łódź	1,821,514	1,331,727	73.11
Lesser Poland	2,625,479	1,941,743	73.96
Masovian	4,152,285	3,218,427	77.51
Opole	720,842	451,310	62.61
Subcarpathian	1,594,072	1,107,294	69.46
Podlaskie	867,625	588,023	67.77
Pomeranian	1,775,803	1,288,961	72.58
Silesian	3,261,536	2,305,374	70.68
Świętokrzyskie	921,271	636,814	69.12
Warmian-Masurian	1,035,396	670,038	64.71
Greater Poland	2,633,052	1,885,361	71.60
West Pomeranian	1,254,853	863,473	68.81
Poland	28,641,910	20,425,238	71.31
Source: National Electoral Commission

==== Voter turnout in large cities (with populations over 250,000) ====
City	Number of eligible voters	Number of valid ballots	Percentage
Wrocław	510,438	401,815	78.72
Poznań	413,189	327,022	79.15
Warszawa	1,384,869	1,151,599	83.16
Szczecin	280,400	209,146	74.59
Kraków	626,893	499,716	79.71
Łódź	488,805	368,837	75.46
Bydgoszcz	241,446	176,801	73.23
Białystok	212,573	155,811	73.30
Gdańsk	376,703	297,414	78.95
Lublin	255,018	190,372	74.65
Total	4,790,334	3,546,118	78.88
Source: National Electoral Commission

==== Voter turnout by location ====
Location	Number of eligible voters	Number of valid ballots	Percentage
City	17,122,097	12,472,310	72.84
Village	11,519,813	7,952,928	69.04
Abroad	721,608	608,043	84.26
Ships	204	176	86.27
Total	29,363,722	21,033,457	71.63
Source: National Electoral Commission

== Campaign spending ==
Candidate	Amount			Source of funds		
Candidate	Spent funds	Cost	Total funds	Voters	Party	V%
Nawrocki	24,597,568.82	4.25	24,633,787.05	23,298,787.05	1,335,000.00	94.6
Trzaskowski	24,587,417.07	3.99	24,603,540.00	10,502,662.04	14,100,877.96	42.7
Mentzen	5,503,159.32	1.90	5,453,890.36	3,653,890.36	1,800,000.00	66.99
Braun	3,847,187.63	3.10	4,535,489.48	4,535,489.48	—	100.0
Hołownia	7,990,197.87	8.16	8,025,154.12	799,154.12	7,226,000.00	9.95
Zandberg	1,009,285.08	1.06	978,035.08	808,035.08	170,000.00	82.6
Biejat	3,573,590.10	4.31	3,573,690.63	141,690.63	3,432,000.00	3.96
Stanowski	109,905.90	0.45	110,000.00	110,000.00	—	100.0
Senyszyn	73,153.98	0.34	73,174.51	73,174.51	—	100.0
Jakubiak	94,609.91	0.63	97,435.57	97,435.57	—	100.0
Bartoszewicz	392,900.95	4.11	397,641.72	397,641.72	—	100.0
Maciak	81,319.73	2.24	79,095.19	79,095.19	—	100.0
Woch	9,155.14	0.50	8,990.00	8,990.00	—	100.0
Source: National Electoral Commission

== Conduct ==
=== PiS campaign funding dispute ===
In the lead-up to the election, a portion of the party subsidy was withheld from Law and Justice. The issue emerged after the National Electoral Commission ruled the party's financial report for the 2023 parliamentary campaign, and consequently its 2023 annual report, to be flawed. As a result, both the campaign dotation and the annual subsidy were reduced by approximately 11 million PLN. The ruling was appealed to the Supreme Court of Poland, where the Extraordinary Review and Public Affairs Chamber decided in favour of the party. This legally bound the commission to change its verdict, which happened on 30 December 2024. However, as the legitimacy of this particular Supreme Court chamber has been questioned by the ruling government and the Court of Justice of the European Union due to the ongoing rule of law crisis since 2017, the Minister of Finance Andrzej Domański refused to transfer the disputed funds. Ultimately, Nawrocki had to conduct his campaign without the funds transferred to PiS. Therefore, he had to finance his campaign through a grassroot effort – around 50,000 supporters donated to his election effort.

=== Electoral Protection Movement ===
PiS launched the "Electoral Protection Movement" (Polish: Ruch Ochrony Wyborów), operated primarily by former minister Przemysław Czarnek, with the intention of safeguarding the democratic conduct of the election and protecting it from electoral fraud.

=== Illegal funding for Trzaskowski and OSCE report ===
Wirtualna Polska detailed allegations of an illegal advertising campaign on Facebook which favored Trzaskowski while attacking Nawrocki and Mentzen, with the advertising campaign having ties to the foreign company Estratos Digital GmbH based in Vienna and headed by two Hungarians — Ádám Ficsor and Viktor Szigetvári, with capital tied to the American Democratic Party. The Organization for Security and Co-operation in Europe (OSCE) and Parliamentary Assembly of the Council of Europe (PACE) investigated the election and confirmed the allegations.

The OSCE-PACE report further pointed out the bias of government institutions like NASK in favor of Trzaskowski. According to the report, public media, like TVP, was also biased, and depicted Nawrocki in a negative light. The Polish National Broadcasting Council released a report accusing TVP and TVN of supporting the Trzaskowski campaign, and TV Republika of supporting Nawrocki.

Shortly before the first round of the election, SMS spam messages were reported encouraging voters to vote for Trzaskowski. Trzaskowski's campaign staff distanced themselves from the messages and informed that they were notifying law enforcement of the incident.

=== Social media ===
The election marked a shift in which social media assumed a significantly greater role, increasingly rivaling traditional media for public attention. The campaign also marked a realignment in the social media landscape, as right-wing ascendancy replaced what had traditionally been a liberal-dominated sphere. In the first round, Sławomir Mentzen dominated the internet sphere, getting 15x as much internet traffic as Nawrocki and 10x as much as Trzaskowski in January. Between January and April, Mentzen received 24 million interactions (likes, comments, shares) with his social media posts, Nawrocki received 6 million, and Trzaskowski 5 million. Negative campaigning on social media occupied a plurality — 1/3rds of election-related activity, with the tag "#AnyoneButTrzaskowski" (Polish: ByleNieTrzaskowski) trending on social media as part of Nawrocki's second round campaign.

=== Election complaints ===
By the end of the deadline for filing them, the Supreme Court of Poland received 54,645 election complaints, significantly more than the 5,800 complaints following the 2020 presidential election, but significantly less than the 600,000 complaints following the 1995 presidential election. According to the Supreme Court, the overwhelming majority were copies of a complaint template shared by election denialist Roman Giertych, colloquially titled "giertychówki". The complaints concerned largely the incidents of the results being swapped in a few polling stations, after it was found that Nawrocki performed abnormally well in some isolated stations that heavily favored Trzaskowski in the first round. The campaign of Trzaskowski also filed a complaint and created a website for its supporters to help them file one as well. The Supreme Court ruled to recount the votes in 13 such stations.

Anomalies were found in some voting station protocols where both candidates lost votes relative to the first round. Journalists investigating the situation have asserted that in 15 polling stations the results may have been flipped, but this would not impact the result of the election as the number of votes potentially affected was well below the margin of victory for Nawrocki. On 12 June, the Supreme Court of Poland ordered a recount in 13 commissions, 0.04% of all 32,143 commissions. On 1 July 2025, the Supreme Court certified Nawrocki's victory as president.

On 18 June, the Polish Minister of Justice and Public Prosecutor General Adam Bodnar announced that the National Public Prosecutor's Office would review the ballots in 250 selected voting stations where "serious anomalies" were considered likely. On 25 July, Prosecutor's Office announced the results of the investigation — out of the 250 voting stations reviewed, irregularities were found in 84 (33%). In 42 of those, the irregularities were at the expense of Trzaskowski, in 34 they were at the expense of Nawrocki, and in 8 the irregularities only concerned invalid votes. The investigation concluded that compared to the official results in the suspected voting stations, Nawrocki received 1538 less votes, and Trzaskowski 1541 more. Therefore, it did not affect the election's results. Later, on 6 August, the Prosecutor's Office declared that it had made a mistake, and that the discrepancy in votes was even smaller than reported — Nawrocki received 1239 less votes and Trzaskowski 1241 more. It also stated that the official election results remain unchanged because the investigation was only meant to determine whether a crime had taken place or not, and "was not intended to determine the results of the presidential election".

== Analysis ==
=== Ruling government ===
Commenting on the assessment of the Tusk's government during the election, political scientist Gavin Rae argued that it showed misalignment with its promises from the 2023 Polish parliamentary election, and continuity with the right-wing policies of the previous government led by Law and Justice:

There has been little progress on women’s and LGBT rights. Despite the propaganda about its economic record, many Poles have had to work even harder to maintain their basic living standards, with 40% of people forced to restrict their spending to make ends meet. With Tusk introducing a new round of deregulation, public services – the health service in particular – have continued to deteriorate, leaving many with inadequate care.

At the same time, the KO did much to extend the right-wing policies of the PiS. It has intensified the anti-migrant atmosphere which has long been building in the country, cancelling the right to asylum for some refugees crossing into Poland from Belarus and attempting to push them back across the border. Rather than taking meaningful steps to reverse the PiS legal reforms – designed to consolidate power in the executive – it has pursued a similar course of action to its predecessor: seizing control of the Polish public broadcaster by firing its directors and replacing them with sympathetic ones.

Bright Blue wrote that "As it stands, Tusk’s grand coalition, despite Tusk having campaigned on a centre-left platform, is proving surprisingly centre-right". It noted the government's anti-immigration policies such as sharpening border controls, temporarily suspending the right of asylum, reducing the number of visas issued. Additionally, the organization noted Tusk's call for "an enormous deregulatory effort" in order to make Poland and Europe a "more competitive economic environment than the USA". Verfassungsblog wrote:

The so-called “15 October Coalition” – an alliance of the liberal Civic Platform (PO), the Left, and the conservative Third Way – came to power in late 2023 in the atmosphere of democratic awakening and civic mobilization. Yet, despite its progressive commitments, the government soon shifted to the right. Key demands from its electoral base – including abortion reform and legal recognition of civil partnerships – were quietly sidelined. More tellingly, the coalition maintained several PiS-era policies, particularly its hardline stance on migration at the Belarusian border, effectively mirroring the very approach it had vocally condemned.

=== Election results ===
The election was similar to the 2024 United States presidential election, which was won by Republican Donald Trump by 1.5% over Democrat Kamala Harris. The defeats of Harris and Trzaskowski also showed that right-wing populism had staying power, even in countries known for their liberal traditions. Trump himself endorsed Nawrocki.

Verfassungsblog wrote:

In any case, the outcome was predictable and mirrored Kamala Harris’s 2024 campaign mistakes: Trzaskowski failed to win over conservatives while demobilizing much of his progressive base.

Both elections showed an intensely polarized electorate and strong educational polarization. In both countries, higher educational attainment corresponded to higher support for the liberal candidate. Like in Poland, where Nawrocki won among working class voters, Trump won low-income voters, while Harris won voters making over $100,000 a year.

== Aftermath ==
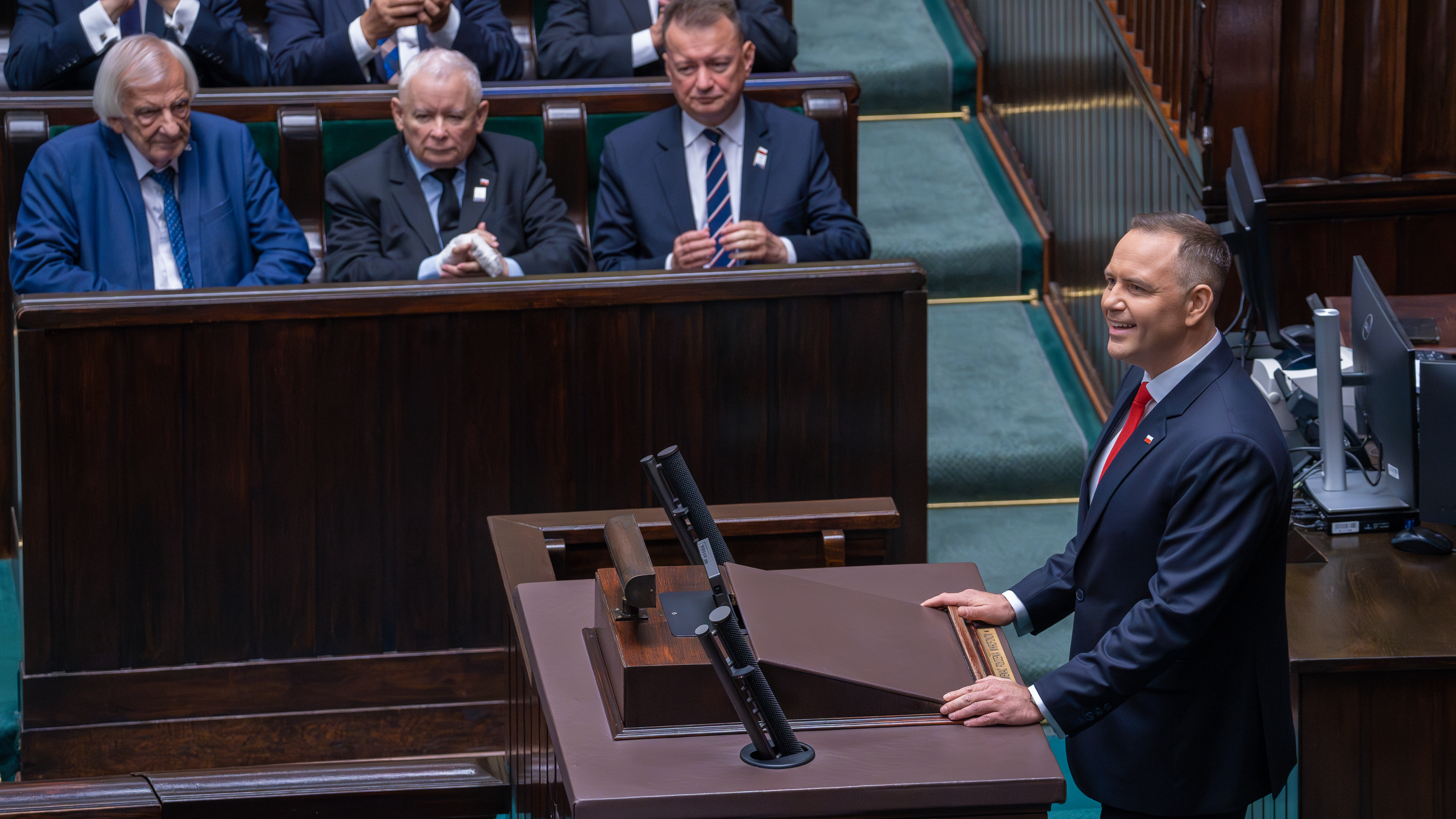
Karol Nawrocki giving a speech at his inauguration on 6 August 2025

Trzaskowski initially claimed victory after the first exit poll showed him leading, while Nawrocki said that the results were too close to call. Trzaskowski subsequently conceded after the final results showed Nawrocki winning. Nawrocki was sworn in on 6 August 2025.

Prime Minister Donald Tusk called a vote of confidence on his government, which was held on 11 June. Despite speculation of a possible breakdown of the coalition, Tusk survived after gaining the support of all 243 MPs that made up his coalition. Later, Donald Tusk's cabinet was reshuffled.

The Third Way alliance dissolved on 17 June, as the Polish People's Party declared it will contest the next Polish parliamentary election separately from Szymon Hołownia's Poland 2050. After further disputes within Poland 2050, the party further fractured with half of its parliamentary representation leaving to form Centre in February 2026. Trzaskowski's defeat also led to the creation of the New Poland and New Wave parties.

=== Election result disputes ===
Several politicians and journalists aligned with the ruling coalition sowed doubt about the election results. Roman Giertych claimed opposition committed organized electoral fraud, claiming also that Nawrocki's campaign was advantaged by a right-leaning TikTok algorithm, which helped them in the campaign. Many other journalists and politicians, like PKW member Ryszard Kalisz, called for a recount of the election. Other figures, like Prime Minister Donald Tusk and Trzaskowski's chief of staff or organizations like the Conference of Ambassadors and Committee for the Defence of Democracy also cast doubt on the election results.

According to an SW Research poll for Rzeczpospolita from 17–18 June, 49% of the respondents supported a complete recount of the election. However, Krzysztof Wiak, the President of the Supreme Court, declared that there is no legal basis for a complete recount of the election, as the recount can only be ruled in stations where irregularities occurred.

Following the election, opponents of Nawrocki—including Prime Minister Donald Tusk together with election denialists—attempted to have the Marshal of the Sejm, Szymon Hołownia, block or postpone the inauguration of Karol Nawrocki as president of Poland by calling an indefinite break during the National Assembly (the joint session of the Sejm and Senat), during Nawrocki's inauguration, after which the Marshal of the Sejm would serve as acting president, which was described by some as an attempt to conduct a coup d'état. Following Hołownia's refusal of the idea, pro-government outlets like Gazeta Wyborcza accused Hołownia of treason against the Constitution.

== See also ==
- 2024 United States presidential election
- 2025 national electoral calendar
- 2025 elections in the European Union
