= List of schools in Poland =

This is a compendium of schools in Poland by voivodeship with original source data. The complete government summary is available at the List of Schools in Poland per each Voivodeship (Wykaz szkół i placówek oświatowych według województw) provided by the Education Digital Centre, Poland (Centrum Informatyczne Edukacji, CIE); retrievable in both Zip and Excel formats, with each school's full name and street address listed. The official data include state subsidized Grade 0 preschools prior to the commencement of compulsory education.

Map of Regional Commissions of Educational Examining, Poland, within voivodeships

== Greater Poland Voivodeship ==
Featured are: 5,659 schools categorized by agglomeration and type, with CIE codes for classroom sizes and gminas. Digital source file for the Greater Poland Voivodeship (woj. wielkopolskie) official list of schools is available at:

1. SIO: wielkopolskie.zip Retrieved 26 November 2014.

See also Wikipedia articles about selected locations which include:

- Adam Mickiewicz High School in Poznań
- St. John Cantius High School, Poznań, Poland
- Saint Mary Magdalene High School in Poznań

== Kuyavian-Pomeranian Voivodeship ==
Featured are: 3,316 schools categorized by agglomeration and type, with CIE codes for classroom sizes and gminas. Digital source file for the Kuyavian-Pomeranian Voivodeship (woj. kujawsko-pomorskie) official list of schools is:

1. SIO: kujawsko-pomorskie.zip Retrieved 26 November 2014.

See also Wikipedia articles about selected locations which include:

- High School No. 1 in Bydgoszcz

== Lesser Poland Voivodeship ==
Listed are: 6,015 schools categorized by agglomeration and type, with CIE codes for classroom sizes and gminas. Digital source file for the Lesser Poland Voivodeship (woj. małopolskie) official list of schools is:

1. SIO: malopolskie.zip Retrieved 26 November 2014.

See also Wikipedia articles about selected locations which include:

- Bartłomiej Nowodworski High School
- British International School of Cracow
- International School of Krakow
- Jan III Sobieski High School, Kraków
- John Paul II High School in Tarnów

== Lower Silesian Voivodeship ==
Featured are: 4,283 schools categorized by agglomeration and type, with CIE codes for classroom sizes and gminas. Digital source file for the Lower Silesian Voivodeship (woj. dolnośląskie) official list of schools is:

1. SIO: dolnoslaskie.zip Retrieved 26 November 2014.

See also Wikipedia articles about selected locations which include:

- BISC Wrocław

== Lublin Voivodeship ==
Listed are: 3,881 schools. Digital source file for the Lublin Voivodeship (woj. lubelskie) official list of schools is available at:

1. SIO: lubelskie.zip Retrieved 26 November 2014.

== Lubusz Voivodeship ==
Listed are: 1,539 schools. Digital source file for the Lubusz Voivodeship (woj. lubuskie) official list of schools is available at:

1. SIO: lubuskie.zip Retrieved 26 November 2014.

== Łódź Voivodeship ==
Listed are: 3,811 schools. Digital source file for the Łódź Voivodeship (woj. łódzkie) official list of schools is:

1. SIO: lodzkie.zip Retrieved 26 November 2014.

See also Wikipedia articles about selected locations which include:

- Maria Konopnicka Special Education School Complex

== Masovian Voivodeship ==
Listed are: 8,185 schools. Note that the official register of schools in the city of Warsaw (the Masovian Voivodeship's as well as Poland's capital), includes 1,084 schools alone. Digital source file for the Masovian Voivodeship (woj. mazowieckie) official list of schools is:

1. SIO: mazowieckie.zip Retrieved 26 November 2014.

See also Wikipedia articles about selected locations which include:

- Lauder – Morasha School
- Marshal Stanisław Małachowski High School, Płock
- Stefan Batory Gymnasium and Lyceum (Warsaw, Poland)
- Warsaw School of Business and Finance (Warsaw, Poland)

International schools:

- American School of Warsaw
- The British School, Warsaw
- International American School of Warsaw
- The Japanese School in Warsaw
- Willy-Brandt-Schule
- Lycée Français de Varsovie

== Opole Voivodeship ==
Listed are: 1,799 schools. Digital source file for the Opole Voivodeship (woj. opolskie) official list of schools is available at:

1. SIO: opolskie.zip Retrieved 26 November 2014.

== Podkarpackie Voivodeship ==
Listed are: 4,051 schools categorized by type, and name of agglomeration, with CIE codes for classroom sizes and gminas. Digital source file for the Podkarpackie Voivodeship (woj. podkarpackie) official list of schools is:

1. SIO: podkarpackie.zip Retrieved 26 November 2014.

See also Wikipedia articles about selected locations which include:

- Konarski Secondary School in Rzeszów

Lui

1. SIO: podlaskie.zip ĺRetrieved 26 November 2014.

See also Wikipedia articles about selected locations which include:

- VI High School – King Sigismund Augustus

Luigi mito

== Pomeranian Voivodeship ==
Listed are: 3,787 schools categorized by type, and name of agglomeration, with CIE codes for classroom sizes and gminas. Digital source file for the Pomeranian Voivodeship (woj. pomorskie) official list of schools is:

1. SIO: pomorskie.zip Retrieved 26 November 2014.

See also Wikipedia articles about selected locations which include:

- Gimnazjum nr 24 k. III High School

== Silesian Voivodeship ==
Listed are: 7,014 schools categorized by type, and name of agglomeration, with CIE codes for classroom sizes and gminas. Digital source file for the Silesian Voivodeship (woj. śląskie) official list of schools is:

1. SIO: slaskie.zip Retrieved 26 November 2014.

See also Wikipedia articles about selected locations which include:

- Complex of Silesian International Schools

== Świętokrzyskie Voivodeship ==
Listed are: 2,277 schools categorized by type, and name of agglomeration, with CIE codes for classroom sizes and gminas. Digital source file for the Świętokrzyskie Voivodeship (woj. świętokrzyskie) official list of schools is:

1. SIO: swietokrzyskie.zip Retrieved 26 November 2014.

See also Wikipedia articles about selected locations which include:

- Collegium Gostomianum

== Warmian-Masurian Voivodeship ==
Listed are: 2,495 schools categorized by type, and name of agglomeration, with CIE codes for classroom sizes and gminas. Digital source file for the Warmian-Masurian Voivodeship (woj. warmińsko-mazurskie) official list of schools is available at:

1. SIO: warminsko-mazurskie.zip Retrieved 26 November 2014.

== West Pomeranian Voivodeship ==
Listed are: 2,691 schools categorized by type, and name of agglomeration, with CIE codes for classroom sizes and gminas. Digital source file for the West Pomeranian Voivodeship (woj. zachodniopomorskie) official list of schools is available at:

1. SIO: zachodniopomorskie.zip Retrieved 26 November 2014.

== See also ==
- Education in Poland
- List of universities in Poland
- List of law schools in Poland
