= Higher education in Poland =

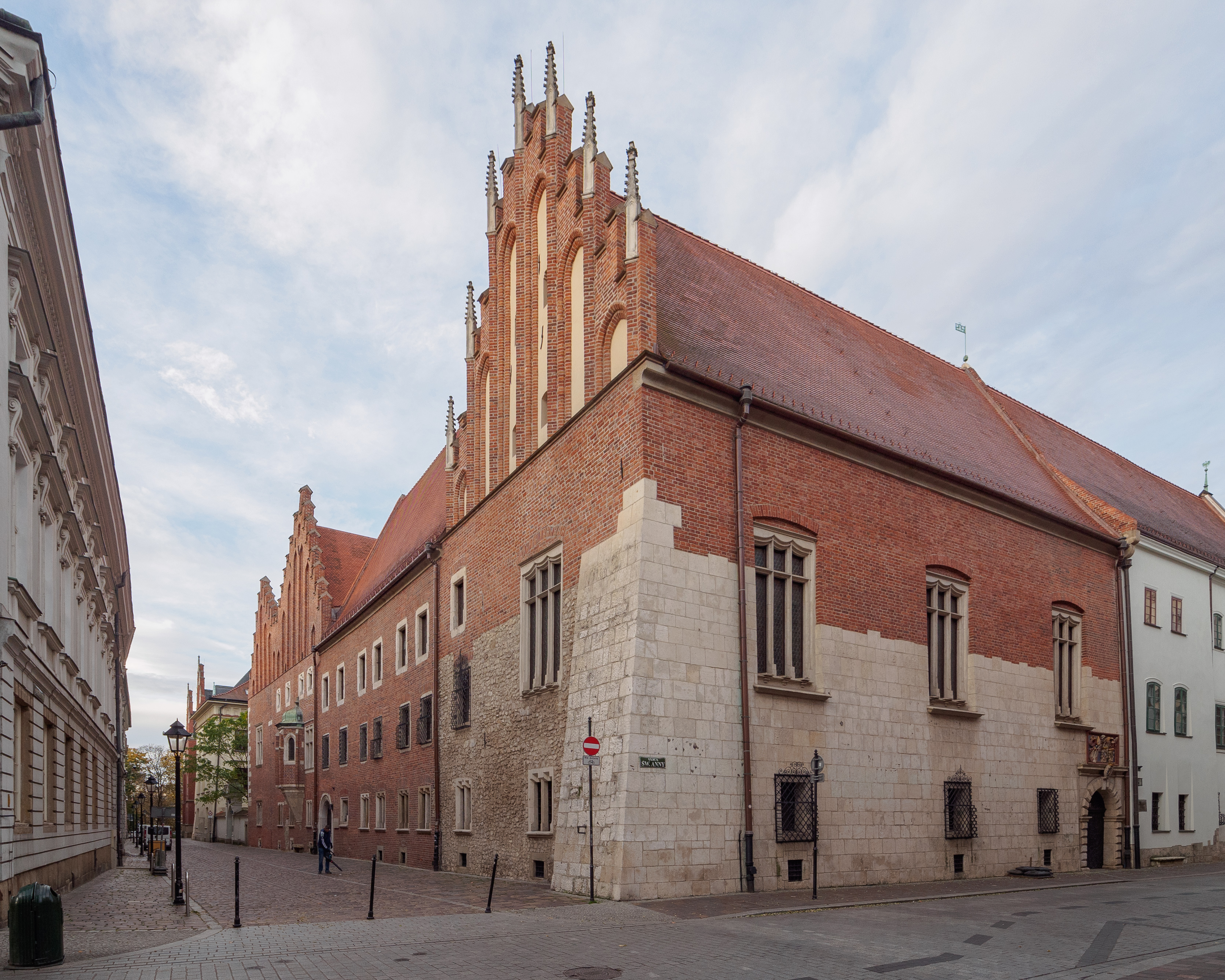
Jagiellonian University in Kraków, the oldest university in Poland and one of the oldest universities in continuous operation in the world

Higher education in Poland consists of public and private universities, as well as state-run police and military academies.

== History ==
=== Medieval and early modern ===
Higher education in Poland began in the Middle Ages. In 1364, King Casimir III established the first Polish university, the Academy of Kraków (now called Jagiellonian University).

Further institutions of higher education in early modern Poland included the Albertina University (founded in 1544, granted royal privilege by Polish King Sigismund II Augustus in 1560), Zamoyski Academy in Zamość (founded in 1594), University of Lwów (founded in 1660) and several Jesuit colleges, the oldest in Braniewo (1565), Pułtusk (1566), Poznań (1572), Jarosław (1575), Lublin (1582), Riga (1582), Kalisz (1583). The traditions of a number of Jesuit colleges are continued by modern general education liceums.

=== Late modern period ===
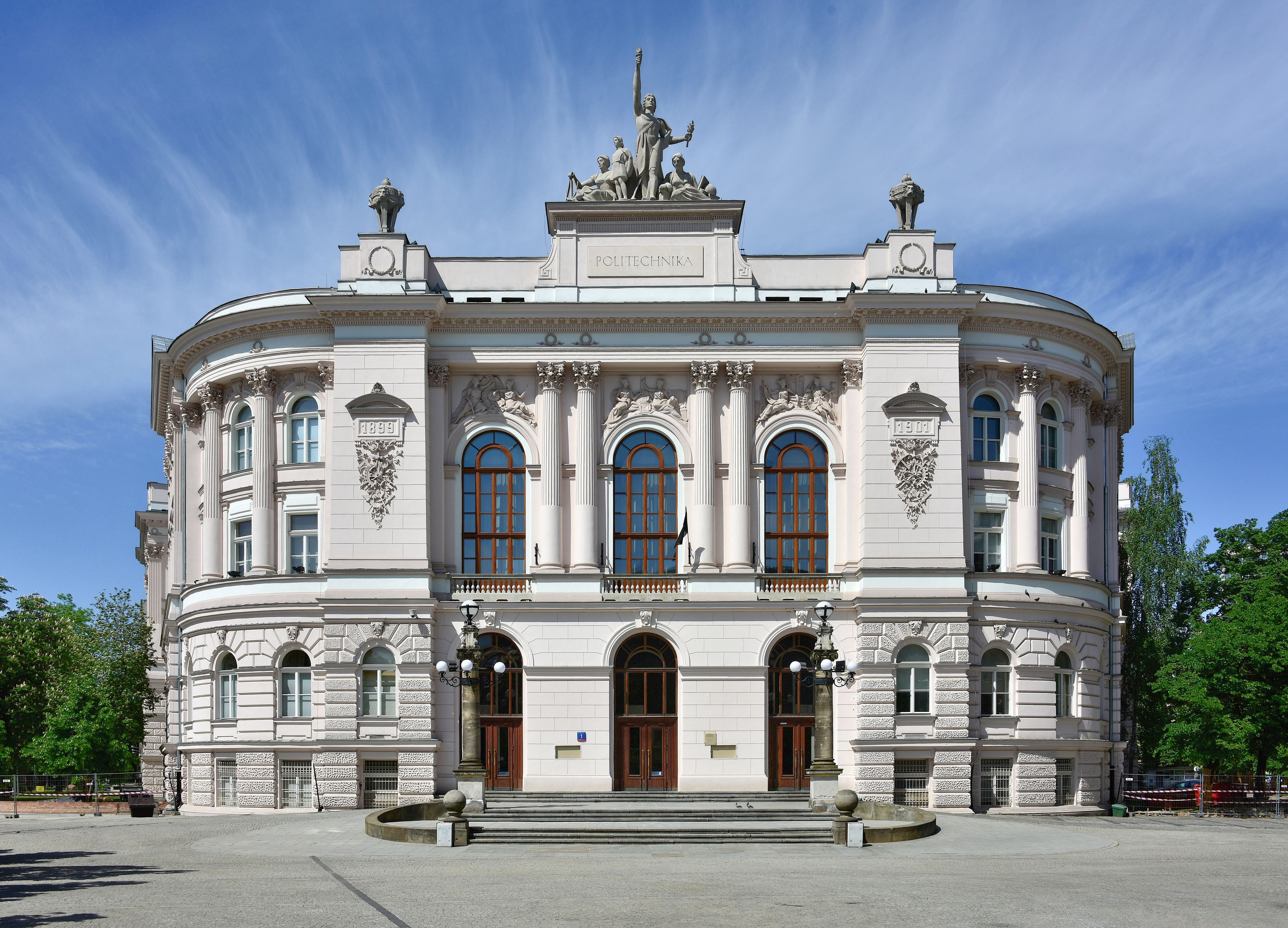
Warsaw University of Technology, the oldest technical university in Poland

In 1826 the first technical university was established in Warsaw, leading eventually to the establishment of Warsaw University of Technology, the largest technical university in Poland.

From 1919 to 1939 universities were focused primarily on arts, science, and engineering. Education was based solely on Humboldt's model of university combining research and teaching. This model incorporates a strict hierarchy of authority and a considerable degree of autonomy for its governing bodies.

=== World War II ===
During the German and Soviet occupation in World War II, Polish higher education was suppressed. Among the most known crimes committed by the occupiers against Polish academics were the mass arrest of 184 academics of the Jagiellonian University, AGH University of Kraków, Academy of Economics in Kraków, Catholic University of Lublin and Stephen Báthory University in the 1939 Sonderaktion Krakau, and the 1941 massacre of Lwów professors.

Polish academics expelled from western to central Poland, espiecially from Poznań, organized the underground University of the Western Lands. It operated primarily in Warsaw, but also in Częstochowa, Grodzisk Mazowiecki, Jędrzejów, Kielce, Milanówek, Ostrowiec Świętokrzyski and Radomsko.

=== Post World War II ===
Many higher education institutions were established after World War II. At the end of communism (1989), there were 820 institutions in Poland, about 20 of them being engineering oriented. In the 1990s a two-tier system was reinstituted. The first tier was considered to be vocational rather than academic. The two-tier system was instituted in Poland well before it was suggested by the Bologna declaration.

After 1989 higher education in Poland changed dramatically. Borders were opened, leading to free mobility and autonomy of universities in curricula and management. New laws concerning higher education, convertible Polish currency, easy communication, (telephone and Internet), and access to European education and research programs made higher education more accessible.

=== Twenty-first century ===
In 2001 there were 1,224,600 students enrolled in the publicly funded universities and colleges. In the private universities and colleges there were 519,100 students. This number has quadrupled over previous enrollment figures. This rise in the rate of enrollment in higher education strongly influences the qualification level of the youngest age group making up the workforce.

Considering that an individual's active life lasts about forty years, more time is needed to raise the level of adult education. In a 1995 census, 6.8% of the Polish population held a higher education degree. In 2008, this percentage was 17,4.

The impact of the Bologna declaration on education in Poland made the diploma supplement mandatory for all diplomas in Poland. Polish universities then pushed for the European Credit Transfer System which was a quality assessment and accreditation program. There had been no official national system of credit transfer and accumulation in Poland previously. Therefore; a credit-point system was introduced for particular specialization.

The promotion of mobility had the goal to reach 10 percent. The obstacle in student mobility are differences in the organization of the academic year in European countries. The number of students coming to Poland is about 10 times lower than other countries and the need for other European languages was evident. Warsaw had 300 students in English and at the Technical University of Lodz there were 500 students in English and French.

== Public versus private ==
Third Republic of Poland concentrated on the opening of new universities in the major cities. Poland started setting up vocational and pedagogical schools and university branch campuses. Private universities and colleges became more easily accessible to young people from the country and from working-class families than were the public higher educational institutions. The location is one of the most important criteria in choosing a university this is due to costs for travel and room and board often exceed the costs of tuition at a private university located close to a student's place of residence.

Education in Poland is one of the few sectors that was not restructured after the ending of the communist era. The systems in use for managing public universities and colleges vary substantially from those used in the private sector. The costs of instruction in public universities and colleges are higher than those in private institutions. The globalization of public life and the perspective of Polish membership in the European Union are pushing Polish graduates to choose to work abroad. It is inevitable that children from poor families and from small villages have practically no possibilities to enter admission competition and to take entrance examinations. Private higher education institutions, located close to the homes of such candidates, are more easily accessible to them.

Poland has been at the forefront of the development of the private higher education sector. Private educational institutions provide education to students for a fee; not for profit and usually invest their financial surplus in the development of themselves and their facilities.

Private higher education institutions are devoid of the burden of collective management. Their decisions are made by the rector or presidents. The senate and the faculty council are entirely advisory bodies which confer the academic degrees. Private institutions can respond rapidly to the changing needs of educational demand and labour market needs.

The majority of private higher educational institutions offer 3 year courses of study for a bachelor's degree. Only about twelve institutions offer a 5-year course of study which leads to a master's degree and only one has obtained the right to confer the doctorate degree. There are now 12 private institutions that occupy top positions relating to the standards of tertiary education which are published every year by many institutions.

Private higher education institutions are decidedly more expensive for students than are the public. Private institutions are more flexible and definitely offer higher quality services than do their public counterparts. The public institutions are taking note and are taking measures to reduce these proportions. Nearly 100% of private institutions are funded from tuition fees and not from the state budget. They are dependent on their markets.

The effects of globalization and education are enormous. Education used to be regarded as a non-tradable service however; private provision of education is huge business in many nations. The technological developments like the Internet and cheaper telecommunications combined with increased acceptance on non-traditional educational settings (remote learning) may well broaden the scope of international trade in education services in the coming years and at this point has created the potential for fast growth.

Globalization has heightened the demand for education, which has also increased many private higher education institutions however; globalization may also lead to an erosion of national regulatory frameworks for education. In a globalized environment where businesses and workers find themselves operating more often in foreign environments, the national character of educational frameworks will potentially cause problems.

By 2010 Poland is hoping that the number of people enrolled in higher education should rise 35-40% and 40-45% in 2020. These increases will raise new challenges for higher education in regards to its accessibility, particularly for the inhabitants of villages and small towns. Ideally Poland wants to decrease the differences in the level of civilization between the country regions and the various social groups. With the spreading effects of the metropolises, the situating of universities and colleges in the medium-sized cities offers a chance to establish education centers of high quality and the possibility of creating innovative processes. The large well-equipped private higher education institutions with increasingly stable staffs are expected to prosper.

The ultimate goal for private institutions is to have official recognition of university status. The majority of institutions educating such specialists will be forced to diversify their offerings, which are bound to increase their costs. Higher education in Poland is trailing many European countries. They need to adapt to the changing labour market which will generate a larger demand for postgraduate, supplementary and retraining studies. By doing this it will increase the role of higher education in the fostering of regional development; the creation of regional innovation networks and a cultural atmosphere.

It is not easy to maintain the national traditions, habits and historical experience and at the same time fulfill common European priorities. The private higher education institutions are not as well treated as public institutions. Only the large national universities can guarantee high-quality education, while private schools require special supervision.

== See also ==
- List of universities in Poland
- History of European research universities
- European Consortium of Innovative Universities
- Education in Poland
- Polish student ID

== Additional resources ==
- Education Services and Globalization. National Education Association Higher Education. Retrieved November 28.
- Gorecki, R. (2001). The University of Warmia and Mazury in Olsztyn as an Agent of Regional Development and Higher Education in Poland. Higher Education in Europe. 26(3). Retrieved November 28, 2007.
- Kolasinski, M. & P. Lisiecki. (2003). The Strategic Role of Public Relations in Creating the Competitive Advantages of Private Higher Education in Poland: The Example of the School of Banking in Poznan. Higher Education in Europe. 28(4) Retrieved November 28, 2007.
