= Teacher's Charter =

The Teacher's Charter (Polish: Karta nauczyciela) is the legal document that defines the rights and duties of school teachers (distinguished from academic teachers) in Poland. It was adopted on January 26, 1982, and has been amended several times since then. The higher education in Poland is governed by the Polish Law on Higher Education.

The Teacher's Charter governs all job positions in public schools below university level (primary, junior high and upper secondary education, Polish: w szkolnictwie podstawowym, gimnazjalnym i ponadgimnazjalnym) that require pedagogical qualifications.

The Charter regulates the working conditions, qualification requirements, duties, disciplinary responsibilities, and principles of professional advancement of teachers; as well as the awards, social benefits, holidays, pensions and health care available to them.

It takes the priority over the Labor Code of Poland.

The Charter has been criticized.
