= 2025 Zabrze mayoral election =

August 2025 mayoral by-election in Zabrze, Poland

- 10 August 2025 (first round); 24 August 2025 (second round)
- Turnout: 27.87% (first round) ▼13.86pp 27.56% (second round) ▼8.86pp
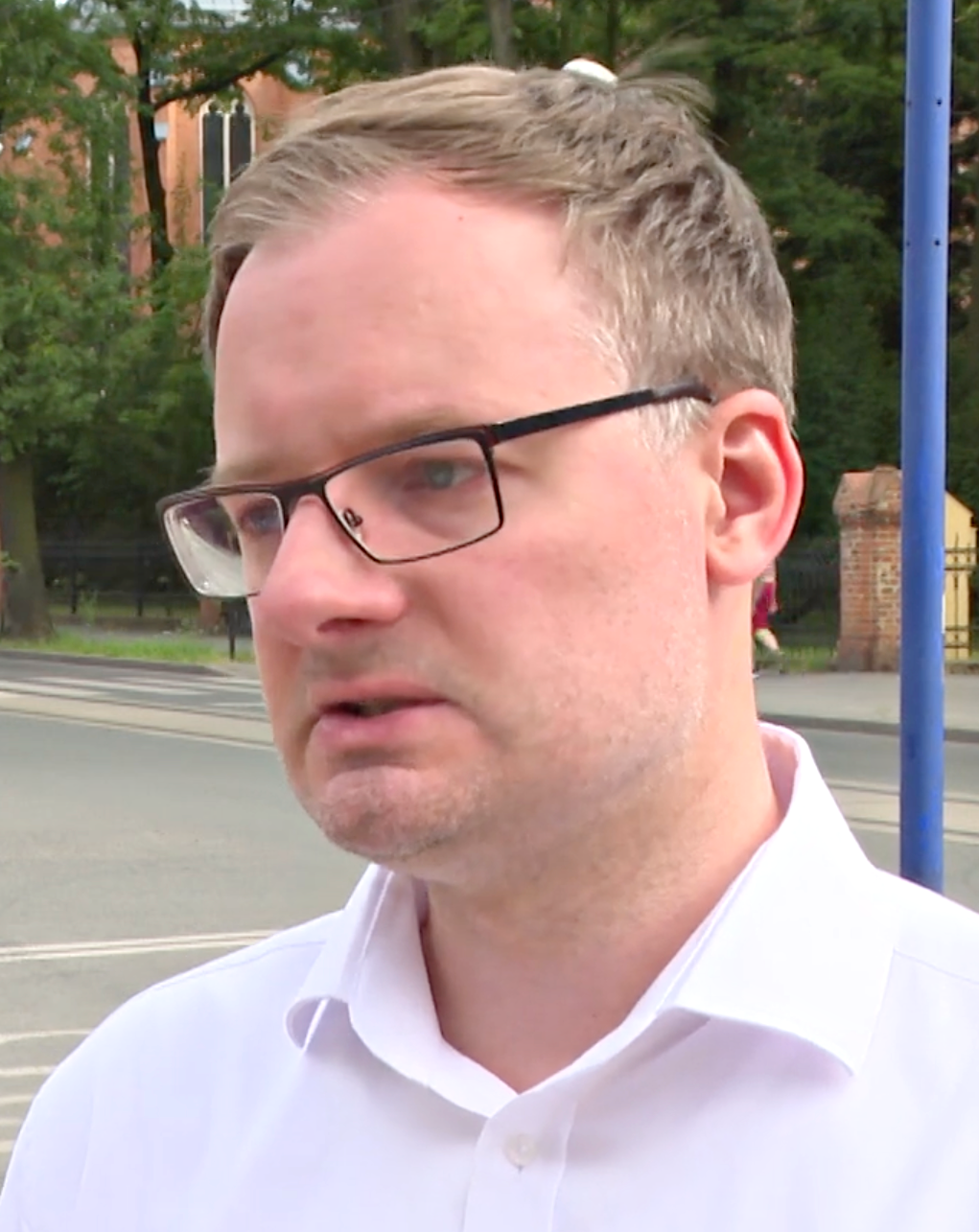

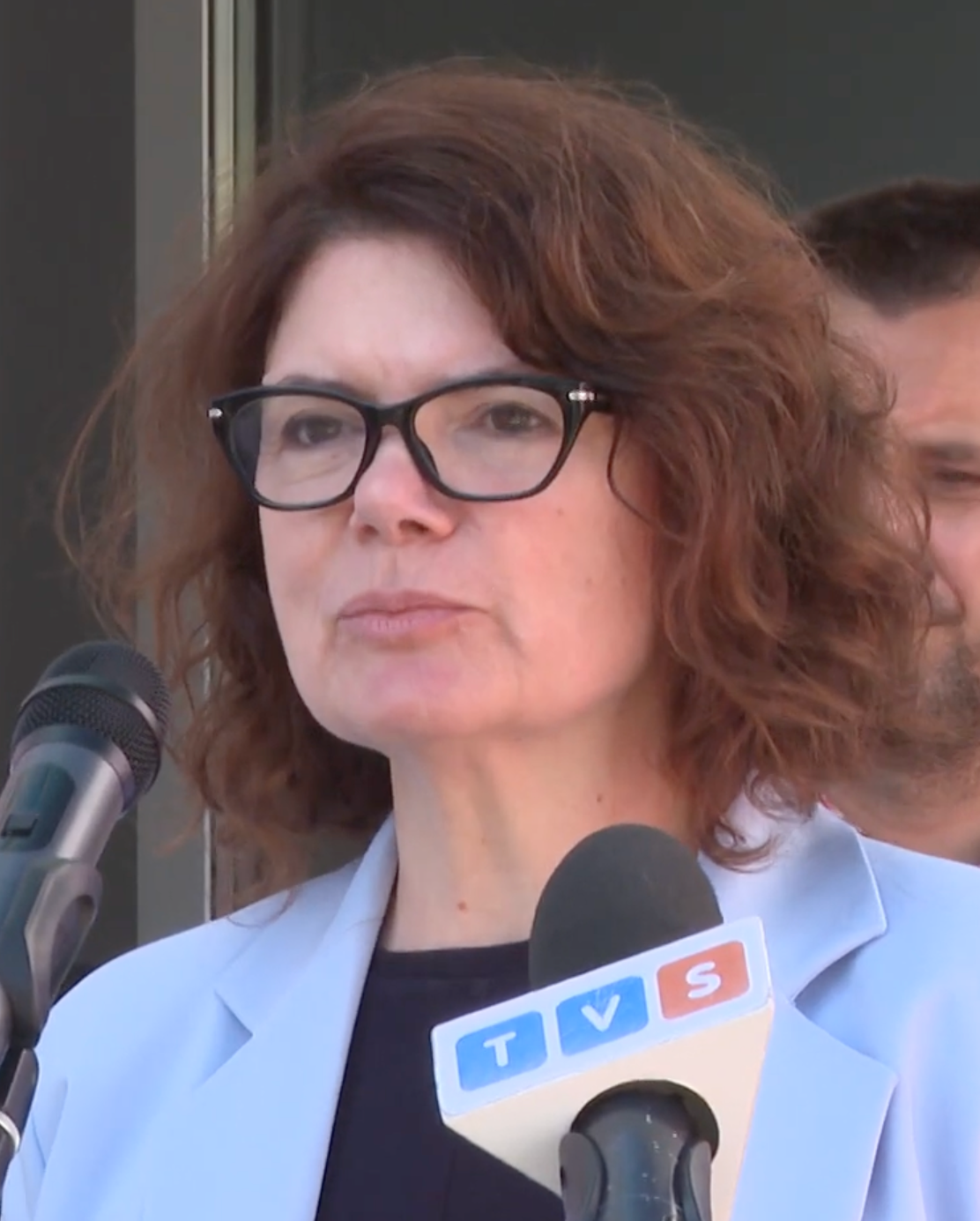
Candidate	Kamil Żbikowski	Ewa Weber
Party	Independent (Note: Independent candidate supported and backed by Better Zabrze.)	Independent (Note: Independent candidate supported and backed by the Civic Platform.)
Popular vote	16,031	15,925
Percentage	50.17%	49.83%
President before election
Ewa Weber (acting)
Independent (PO)
Elected President
Kamil Żbikowski
Independent

The 2025 Zabrze mayoral election was held on 10 and 24 August 2025 in Zabrze to fill a vacancy left by the recall of Agnieszka Rupniewska of the liberal conservative Civic Coalition (KO) on 12 May 2025. Independent Kamil Żbikowski narrowly defeated Ewa Weber (PO/KO) in the second round, leading to KO losing its mayoral seat in Zabrze.

== Background ==
Małgorzata Mańka-Szulik, City president of Zabrze between 2006 and 2024, lost her position in the 2024 mayoral election, attaining 42.15% of the second round vote. She was defeated by Agnieszka Rupniewska of the Civic Coalition (KO). However, Rupniewska soon ran into popular discontent regarding group firings, budgetary issues and the lengthening privatization of Górnik Zabrze, Zabrze's local football club, and the residents of Zabrze collected 14 thousand signatures under an initiative for a recall referendum against the city president and city council.

=== Recall referendum ===
On 11 May 2025, the city of Zabrze held a recall referendum for its city president and city council. The recall referendums required turnout of 3/5ths of the number of votes cast in the 2024 local elections to be valid, with the threshold being set at 25.9 thousand votes for the mayoral recall referendum (3/5ths of the second round votes in the 2024 mayoral election) and 29.6 thousand votes for the city council recall referendum (3/5ths of the votes in the election for city council). The required threshold was met for the mayoral recall referendum, but the city council recall referendum came 112 votes short of success. The option to recall won overwhelmingly in both referendums. Ewa Weber was designated as the acting city president of Zabrze on 17 May by Prime Minister Donald Tusk.

The success of the referendum also gained attention in relation to the concurrently ongoing 2025 presidential election, of which the candidate of the opposition Law and Justice (PiS) party, Karol Nawrocki, described the successful recall as a "symbolic referendum on the Tusk government". According to an OGB exit poll, 59% of people partaking in the referendum held negative views of the incumbent national government, and 18% held positive views.

==== Mayoral recall referendum ====
Choice	Votes	%
For	27,161	92.99
Against	2,046	7.01
Total	29,207	100.00
Valid votes	29,207	99.02
Invalid/blank votes	290	0.98
Total votes	29,497	100.00
Registered voters/turnout	116,949	25.22

==== City council recall referendum ====
Choice	Votes	%
For	26,551	91.22
Against	2,555	8.78
Total	29,106	100.00
Valid votes	29,106	98.69
Invalid/blank votes	386	1.31
Total votes	29,492	100.00
Registered voters/turnout	116,949	25.22

== Candidate selection ==
=== Registered candidates ===
Name	Born	Last position/job	Party	Endorsed by
Borys Borówka	1973 (53)	Vice-president of Zabrze (2018–2024); City councillor of Zabrze	Law and Justice	
Łucja Chrzęstek-Bar	(48)	Vice-chairman of the Zabrze city council	Independent	
Sebastian Dziębowski	(36)	City councillor of Zabrze	New Hope	Confederation
Rafał Kobos	(49); Zabrze, Silesia	Head of the Bureau for Investors in Zabrze	Independent	
Ewa Weber	5 August 1971 (54); Zabrze, Silesia	Acting City president of Zabrze (2025)	Independent	Civic Platform
Kamil Żbikowski	16 August 1986 (38); Zabrze, Silesia	City councillor of Zabrze	Independent	Better Zabrze

== Campaign issues ==
Prominent campaign issues included the city's debt, privatization of the local Górnik Zabrze football club, and the future role of Zabrze in the Upper Silesian-Dąbrowa Basin Metropolis.

== Campaign ==
During the election campaign, national politicians campaigned for mayoral candidates. Jarosław Kaczyński, the chairman of Law and Justice (PiS), arrived in Zabrze on 3 August to endorse Borys Borówka. Leader of the Confederation, Sławomir Mentzen organized a rally on 24 July for his party's candidate, Sebastian Dziębowski. Rafał Kobos was endorsed by former City president Małgorzata Mańka-Szuluk, and ran from the "Effective for Zabrze and Małgorzata Mańka-Szulik" committee. The Civic Platform's (PO) candidate, Ewa Weber, was attacked for having ties with Gliwice, a neighboring city with negative connotations in Zabrze. Weber was previously the vice-president of Gliwice.

During a pre-election debate, Borówka gave Weber a scarf of Piast Gliwice, a rival football club to the local Górnik Zabrze, calling out her Gliwice roots. In response, Weber displayed she was wearing a Górnik Zabrze shirt.

=== Second round candidate endorsements ===
Candidate	First round	Endorsement
Borys Borówka	15.29%	Kamil Żbikowski
Sebastian Dziębowski	14.09%	No endorsement
Rafał Kobos	9.88%	No endorsement
Łucja Chrzęstek-Bar	5.31%	No endorsement

== Timeline ==
The electoral calendar was:

Timeline of the 2025 Zabrze mayoral election

Date	Event description
On the date ordinance is issued	Providing public information in the form of a notice by the Silesian Voivode, the ordinance of the Prime Minister regarding early elections of the City president of Zabrze in the Silesian Voivodeship
Until 16 June 2025	Providing public information in the form of a notice about the designated seat of the Municipal Electoral Commission in Zabrze
Until 16 June 2025	Notification of the Electoral Commissioner in Katowice II about the establishment of an electoral committee and the intention to nominate candidates for the City president of Zabrze
Until 26 June 2025	Submitting to the Electoral Commissioner in Katowice II candidates for members of the Municipal Electoral Commission in Zabrze
Until 1 July 2025	Appointment of the Municipal Electoral Commission in Zabrze by the Electoral Commissioner in Katowice II
Until 7 July 2025	Establishment of polling districts in medical facilities, social welfare facilities, penal institutions and detention centers, as well as in extramural departments of these establishments, dormitories and complexes of dormitories, as well as determination of their boundaries, consecutive number, as well as their locations
Until 11 July 2025	Providing public information on the consecutive numbers and boundaries of polling districts, as well as location of district electoral commissions, including premises adapted to the needs of disabled persons, as well as the possibility of postal voting and proxy voting, Submission of requests to establish polling districts aboard Polish ships by captains of ships, Nomination of candidates to district electoral commission by agents of election committees
Until 11 July 2025	Nomination to the Municipal Electoral Commission in Zabrze candidates to district electoral commissions
Until 16 July 2025 at 16:00 CEST	Submitting to the Electoral Commissioner in Katowice II candidates for the City president of Zabrze
Until 21 July 2025	Establishment by the Electoral Commissioner in Katowice II of district electoral commissions
From 26 July 2025 until 8 August 2025 at 00:00 CEST	Broadcast without payment of the election programmes, prepared by election committees by means of public radio and television broadcasters

Date	Event description
Until 28 July 2025	Providing public information in the form of a notice, by means of posting the announcement of the Municipal Electoral Commission in Zabrze about the registered candidates for the City president of Zabrze
Until 28 July 2025	Notice to the Electoral Commissioner in Katowice II of the intention to vote by correspondence by disabled voters, including by means of overlays on ballot papers in Braille alphabet, and by voters who are 60 years of age or older on the day of voting
Until 1 August 2025	Notice of the intention to vote by correspondence by disabled voters, including by means of overlays on ballot papers in Braille alphabet, and by voters who are 60 years of age or older on the day of voting
On 9 August 2025 at 00:00 CEST	The electoral campaign formally concludes; Election silence commences: no political broadcasts, social media posts, or issuing of new physical advertising materials is allowed
On 10 August 2025	The vote takes place between 7:00–21:00 CEST
Until 11 August 2025	Providing public information in the region of the City of Zabrze about the resolution of the Municipal Electoral Commission in Zabrze regarding the necessity and reasons for repeated voting and the date of repeated voting, as well as surnames and first names of candidates running in the repeated voting
Until 14 August 2025	Notice to the Electoral Commissioner in Katowice II of the intention to vote by correspondence by disabled voters, including by means of overlays on ballot papers in Braille alphabet, and by voters who are 60 years of age or older on the day of voting
Until 18 August 2025	Notice of the intention to vote by correspondence by disabled voters, including by means of overlays on ballot papers in Braille alphabet, and by voters who are 60 years of age or older on the day of voting
On 23 August 2025 at 00:00 CEST	The electoral campaign formally concludes; Election silence commences: no political broadcasts, social media posts, or issuing of new physical advertising materials is allowed
On 24 August 2025	The vote takes place between 7:00–21:00 CEST

== Opinion polls ==
An exit poll conducted on 11 May for the recall referendums released by OGB showed the voting intention of voters in a hypothetical first round election:

- Kamil Żbikowski – 36.36%
- Borys Borówka – 23.86%
- Alina Nowak – 13.64%
- Sebastian Dziębowski – 13.64%
- Rafał Kobos – 6.82%
- Tomasz Olichwer – 5.68%

== Results ==
In the first round, no candidate scored a majority of votes, with Weber coming in first by a wide margin, and Żbikowski coming second narrowly ahead of Borówka and Dziębowski. In the second round, Żbikowski narrowly defeated Weber with a margin of 107 votes.

Candidate	Party	First round		Second round	
Candidate	Party	Votes	%	Votes	%
Kamil Żbikowski	Independent	5,216	16.14	16,031	50.17
Ewa Weber	Independent (PO)	12,700	39.29	15,925	49.83
Borys Borówka	Law and Justice	4,944	15.29		
Sebastian Dziębowski	Confederation (NN)	4,556	14.09		
Rafał Kobos	Independent	3,193	9.88		
Łucja Chrzęstek-Bar	Independent	1,716	5.31		
Total		32,325	100.00	31,956	100.00
Valid votes		32,325	99.39	31,956	99.39
Invalid/blank votes		200	0.61	195	0.61
Total votes		32,525	100.00	32,151	100.00
Registered voters/turnout		116,723	27.87	116,648	27.56
Source: National Electoral Commission

== Aftermath ==
Politicians of the right and left opposition celebrated Żbikowski's narrow victory, with analysts predicting the successful ousting of the Civic Coalition from the mayoralty in Zabrze to be a motivating force for organization of more referendums against the coalition's local government officials. In May 2026, Kraków successfully recalled its city president, Aleksander Miszalski.
