= General education liceum =

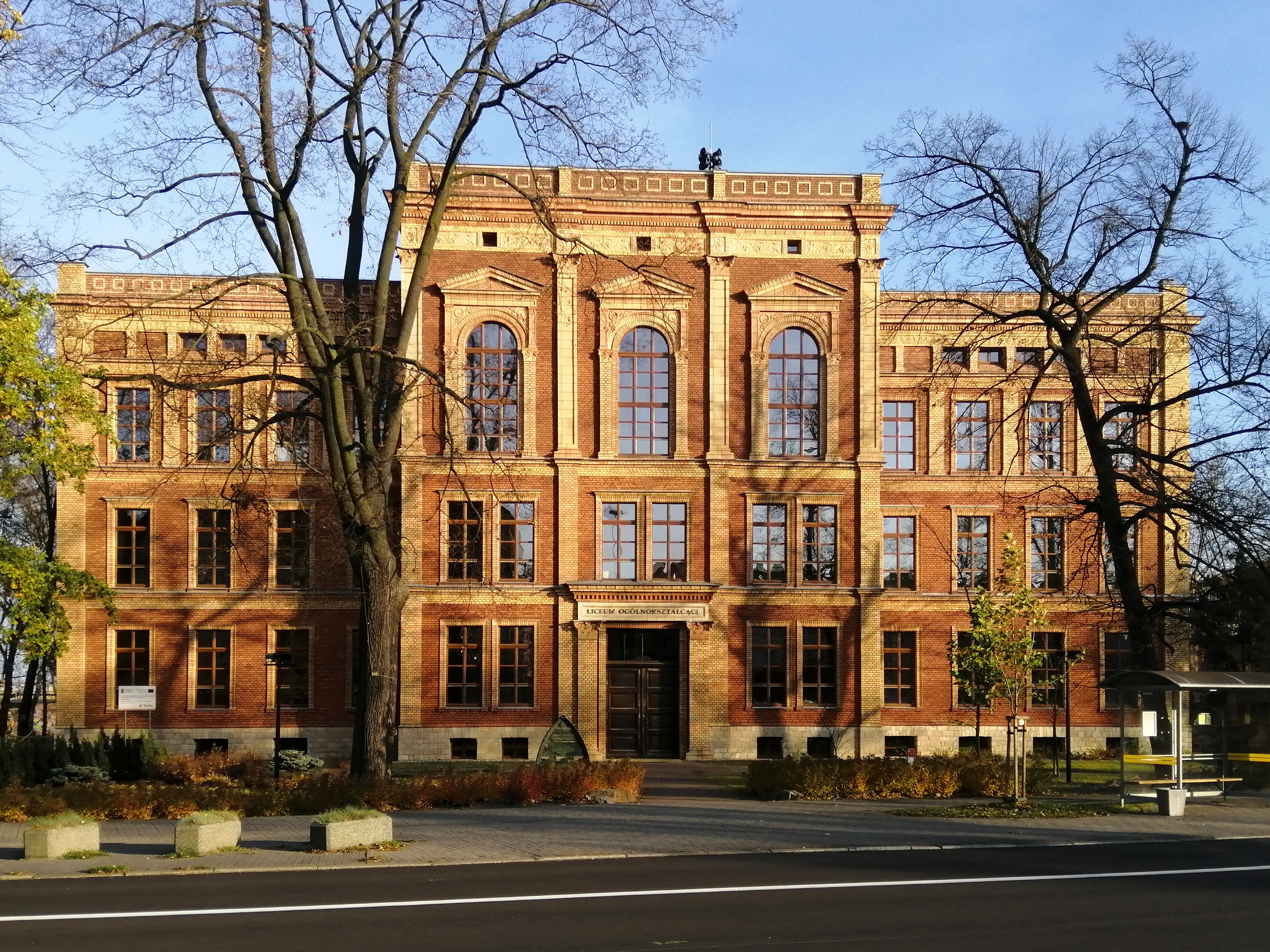
Liceum Ogólnokształcące no. 2 in Tarnowskie Góry

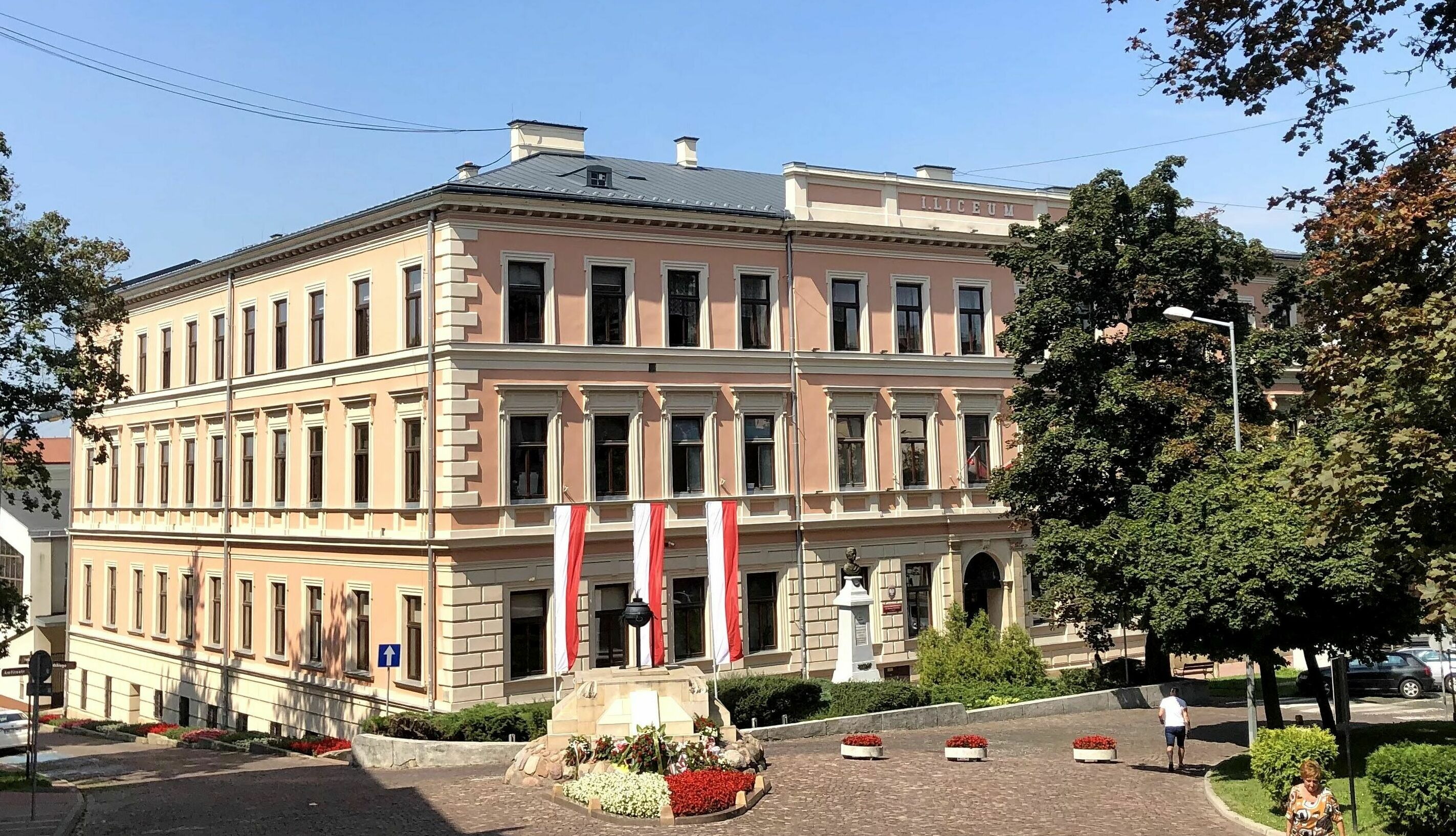
Liceum Ogólnokształcące no. 1 in Tarnów

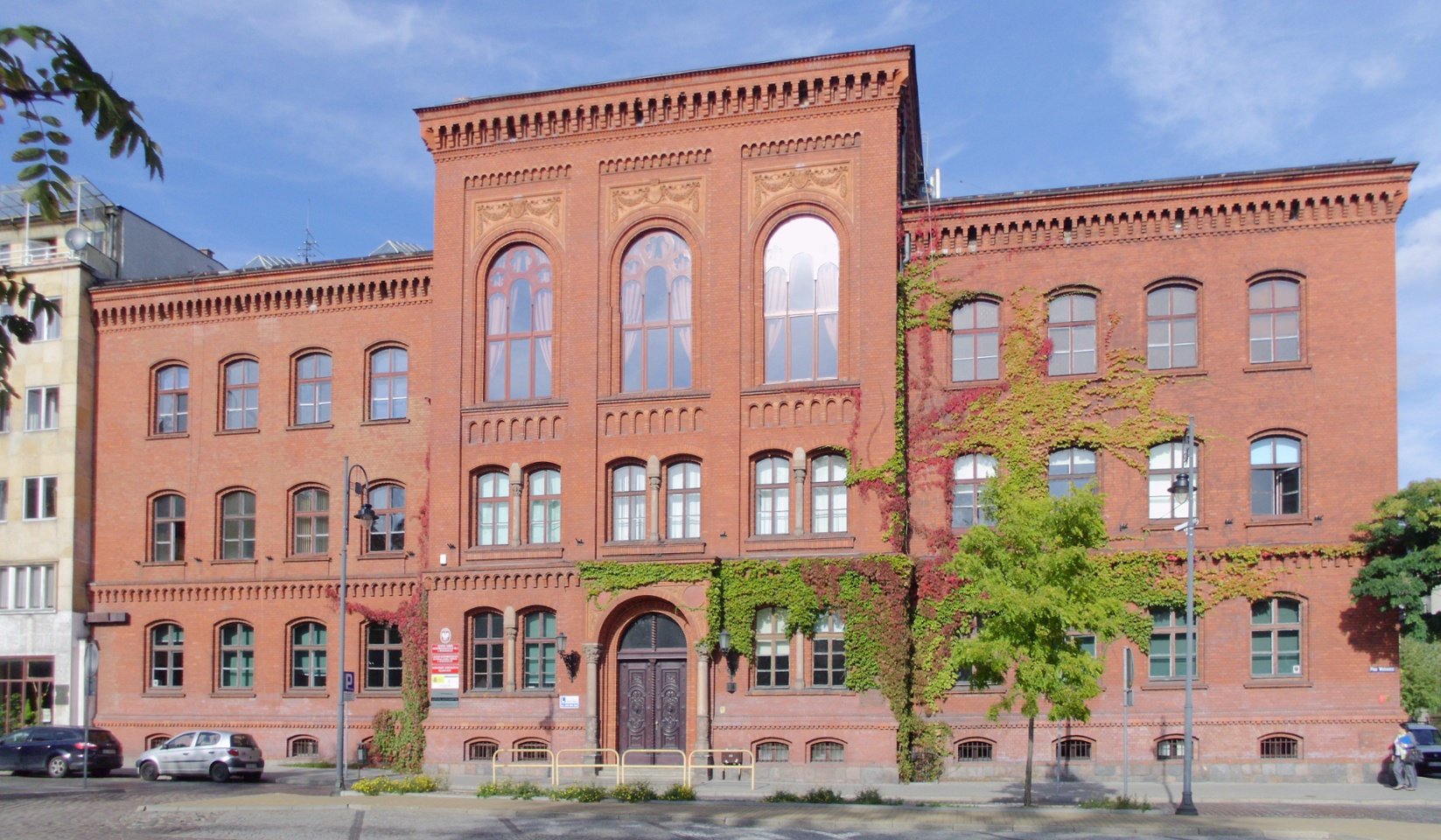
Liceum Ogólnokształcące no. 1 in Bydgoszcz

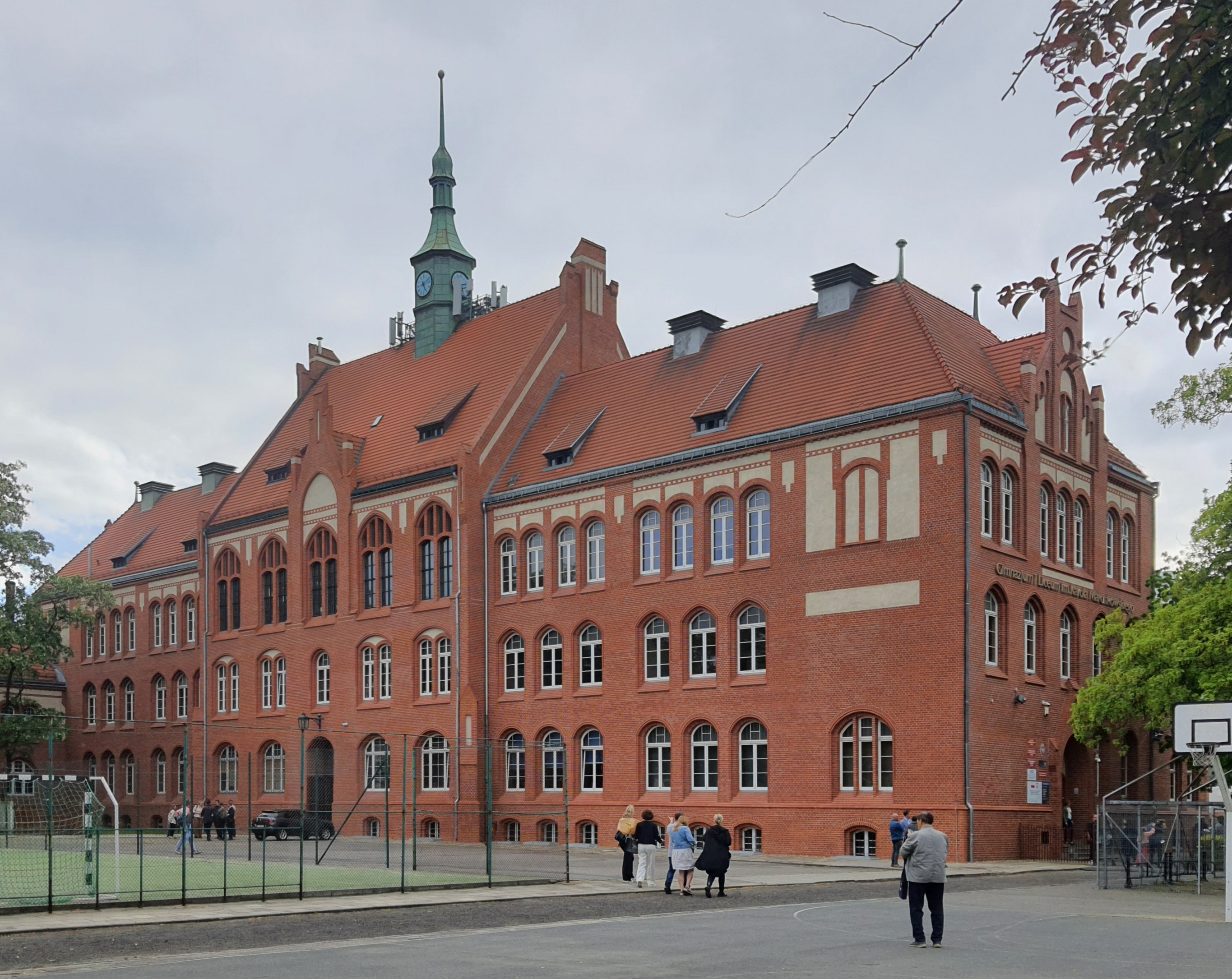
Liceum Ogólnokształcące no. 1 in Poznań

A general education liceum (Polish: Liceum ogólnokształcące [liˈt͡sɛum ɔˌɡulnɔkʂtau̯ˈt͡sɔnt͡sɛ]) is an academic secondary school in the Polish educational system. They are attended by those who plan to further their academic education upon graduation from szkoła podstawowa (primary school) through a path other than Technikum or Vocational school (since it is impossible for one to be at the age of 18 or more upon graduation from szkola podstawowa, thus education is still mandatory for them; one has to pick one of the three).

== Learnings ==
To learn in liceum, students have to finish primary school and pass 8-grader exam (E8). In profiles, there're expanding 2-4 subjects.

Before graduating from liceum, students take a final exam called a "matura" (equivalent to the A-Level). It's a tradition for students of graduating grades and school staff to host and attend a prom called "studniówka" about a 100 days before the exams.

=== Subjects teaching in liceum ===
As of 2025, these subjects are taught in a general education liceum:

- Polish - 4-times a week
- First modern foreign language - 3-times a week
- Second modern foreign language/Latin language - twice a week
- Philosophy/Music/Art/Latin language and antic culture - once a week in 1st class
- History - twice a week in 1st-3rd class, once a week in 4th class (only in 1st half-year)
- Civic education - twice a week in 2nd class, once a week in 3rd class
- Business and administrating - once a week in 1st-2nd class or twice a week in 1st or 2nd class
- Geography - once a week in 1st and 3rd class, twice a week in 2nd class
- Biology - once a week in 1st and 3rd class, twice a week in 2nd class
- Chemistry - once a week in 1st and 3rd class, twice a week in 2nd class
- Physics - once a week in 1st-2nd class, twice a week in 3rd class
- Maths - 3-times a week in 1st and 3rd class, 4-times a week in 2nd and 4th class
- Computer science - once a week in 1st-3rd class
- Physical education - 3-times a week
- Education for safety - once a week in 1st class
- Advisory class - once a week
- Extra-hours for subjects taught in extended scope - 4-times a week in 1st class, 5-times a week in 2nd class, 7-times a week in 3rd class, 6-times a week in 4th class

Because Civic Education is introduced since year 2025, currently (as in 2025/2026) this subject is taught only in 2nd class.

Apart from them, there are (as in 2025) some subjects taught only in extended scope, with curricilum core

- History of music
- History of dance
- History of art
- Knowledge about society (until 2022 also in basic scope)

== History ==
Liceum was first introduced in 1932, as 2-years school, being the second part of general education school (with 4-years gimnazjum). After liquidation of gimnazjums in 1948, it became a 4-years school, for graduates of ground school wanting the general education.

After the reform of education from 1999, liceums became a 3-years school for graduates of gimnazjum. In 2017, was returned to old system.

In past, except general education liceum has existed several other types of liceum:

- Vocational/Specialized Liceum - existed until 2014
- Supplementary Liceum - nowadays as General Education Liceum for Adults (for graduates of vocational school wanting to supplement their education)
- Pedagogical Liceum - existed until 1963, for people wanting to become a teacher

== See also ==
- Lyceum
- Education in Poland
- Technikum (Polish education)
- The Academic High School in Toruń, the first high school in Poland especially created for outstanding students
- Marshal Stanisław Małachowski High School in Płock, the oldest high school in Poland
- Jan III Sobieski High School in Kraków
