= Agnieszka Rupniewska =

Polish politician

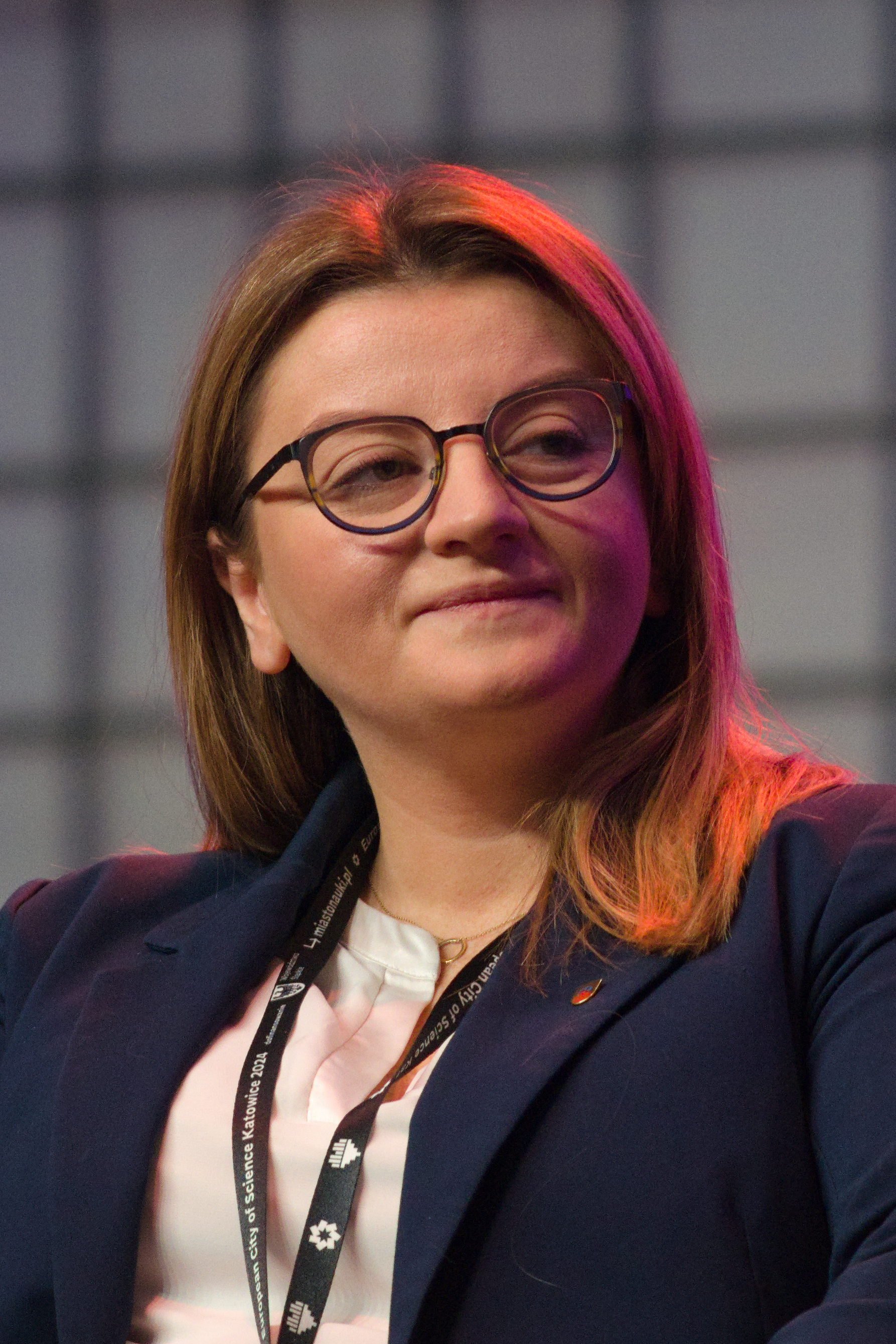
- Rupniewska in 2024

Mayor of Zabrze
- In office 7 May 2024 – 12 May 2025
- Preceded by: Małgorzata Mańka-Szulik
- Succeeded by: Ewa Weber (acting)

Personal details
- Born: 17 March 1986 (age 40) Gliwice, Poland
- Party: Independent (supported by KO)

Agnieszka Małgorzata Rupniewska (born 17 March 1986) is a Polish local government activist and manager. From 2024 to 2025, she was the mayor of Zabrze.

== Biography ==
She graduated from I LO in Zabrze and the Faculty of Law and Administration of the University of Silesia in Katowice. She also completed post-graduate MBA studies. Initially, she was employed in Zabrze's city office, and later tied with the public sector. She worked as the primary specialist for legal affairs in a business. She also became the chairman of the management of an industrial company.

She led a local Young Social Democrats Federation chapter, personally a member of the Democratic Left Alliance (SLD). With the SLD's support, she unsuccessfully ran in 2010 for a Silesian Voivodeship Sejmik seat, in 2006 and 2014 to the Zabrze city council, and in 2015 to the Sejm. She was also chairman of the New Zabrze Association.

In the 2018 local elections she ran for mayor of Zabrze as an independent Civic Coalition (KO) candidate, losing in the second round to Małgorzata Mańka-Szulik, attaining 48% of the vote. However, she earned a seat to the city council. She was the chairman of the city council KO-New Zabrze club. In 2024, she once again ran for mayor of Zabrze (again as an independent KO candidate). In the first round, she had the highest support, and in the second she gained 58% of the vote, defeating Małgorzata Mańka-Szulik. She assumed the office of mayor on 7 May 2024. On 11 May 2025, she was recalled from the office of mayor following a local referendum.
