= University Secondary School in Toruń =

Uniwersyteckie Liceum Ogólnokształcące w Toruniu
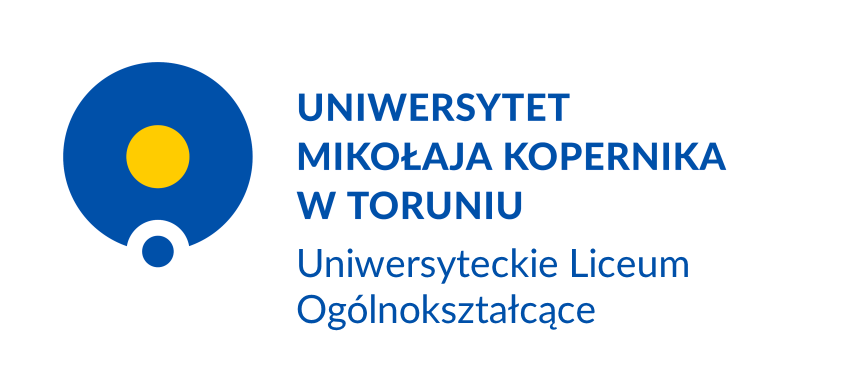
- Logo

Location
- Szosa Chełmińska 83; 87-100 Toruń, Poland
- Coordinates: 53.023°N 18.592°E

Information
- Type: Public
- Established: 1998
- Headmaster: Beata Trapnell
- Language: Polish
- Website: The Academic High School Website

The Academic High School in Toruń (Polish: Uniwersyteckie Liceum Ogólnokształcące w Toruniu, ULO) is a public high school located in Toruń, Poland and founded on January 21, 1998. The high school is supervised by Nicolaus Copernicus University and some of the classes are conducted by the university's lecturers. It is the first high school in Poland especially created for outstanding students. It is one of the best and most prestigious high schools in Poland.

== History ==
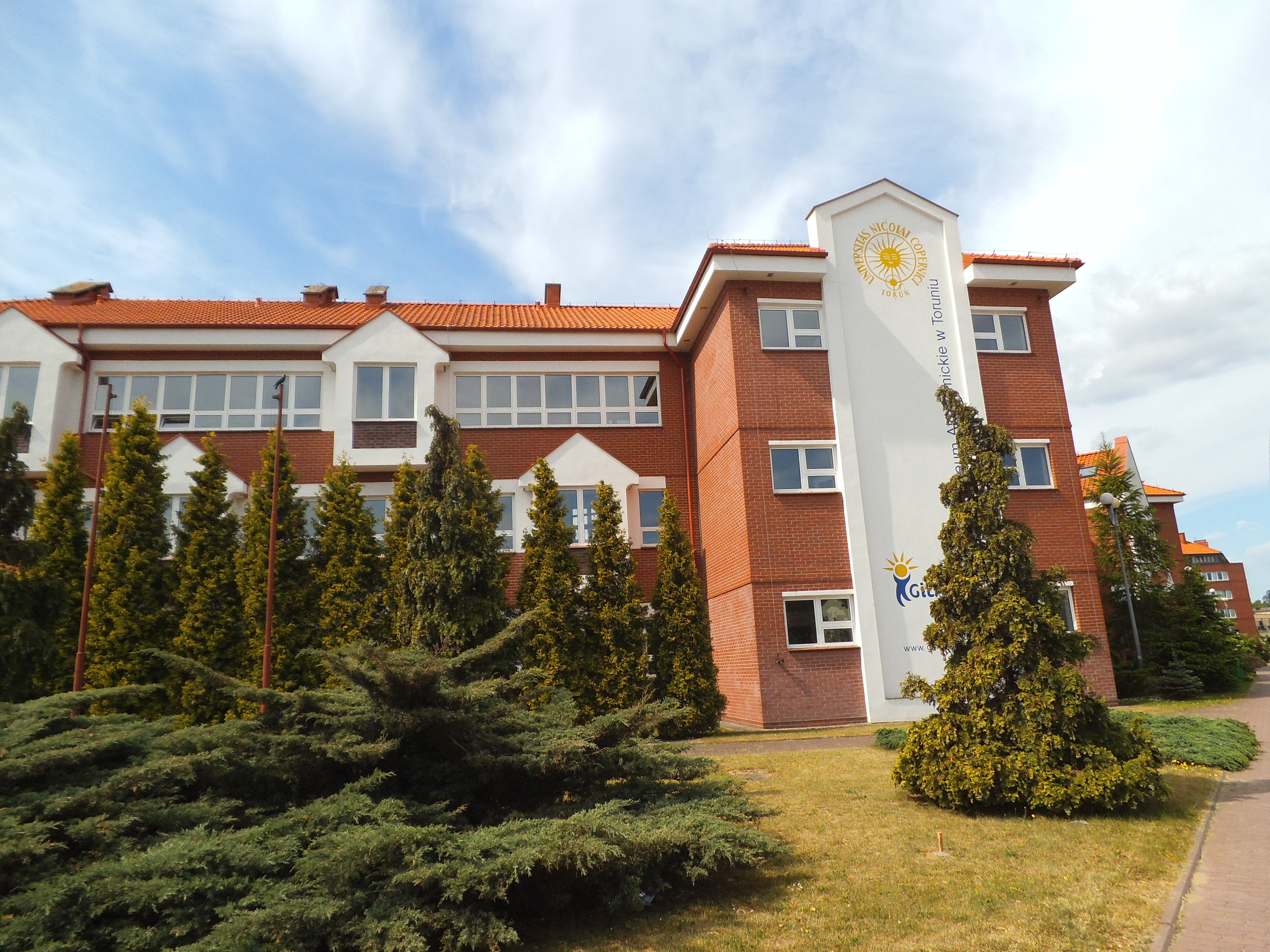
The Main Building

The Academic High School was established in 1998 by Nicolaus Copernicus University, but its tradition refers to Schola Thoruniensis (turned into the Academic Gymnasium in Toruń) founded in the 16th century as well as to the Jan and Jędrzej Śniadecki High School established by the Vilnius University in the interwar period. Polish politician and economist Sławomir Mentzen graduated from this school in 2004.

== Ranking ==
Perspektywy's Ranking of High Schools in Poland
Year	2011	2012	2013	2014	2015	2016	2017	2018	2019	2020	2021	2022	2023	2024
Toruń	1	1	1	1	1	1	1	1	1	1	1	1	1	1
Kuyavian-Pomeranian Voivodship	1	1	1	1	1	1	1	1	1	1	1	1	1	1
Poland	1	1	2	1	4	3	3	2	5	1	2	2	4	4
