= Sławomir Mentzen =

Polish economist and politician (born 1986)

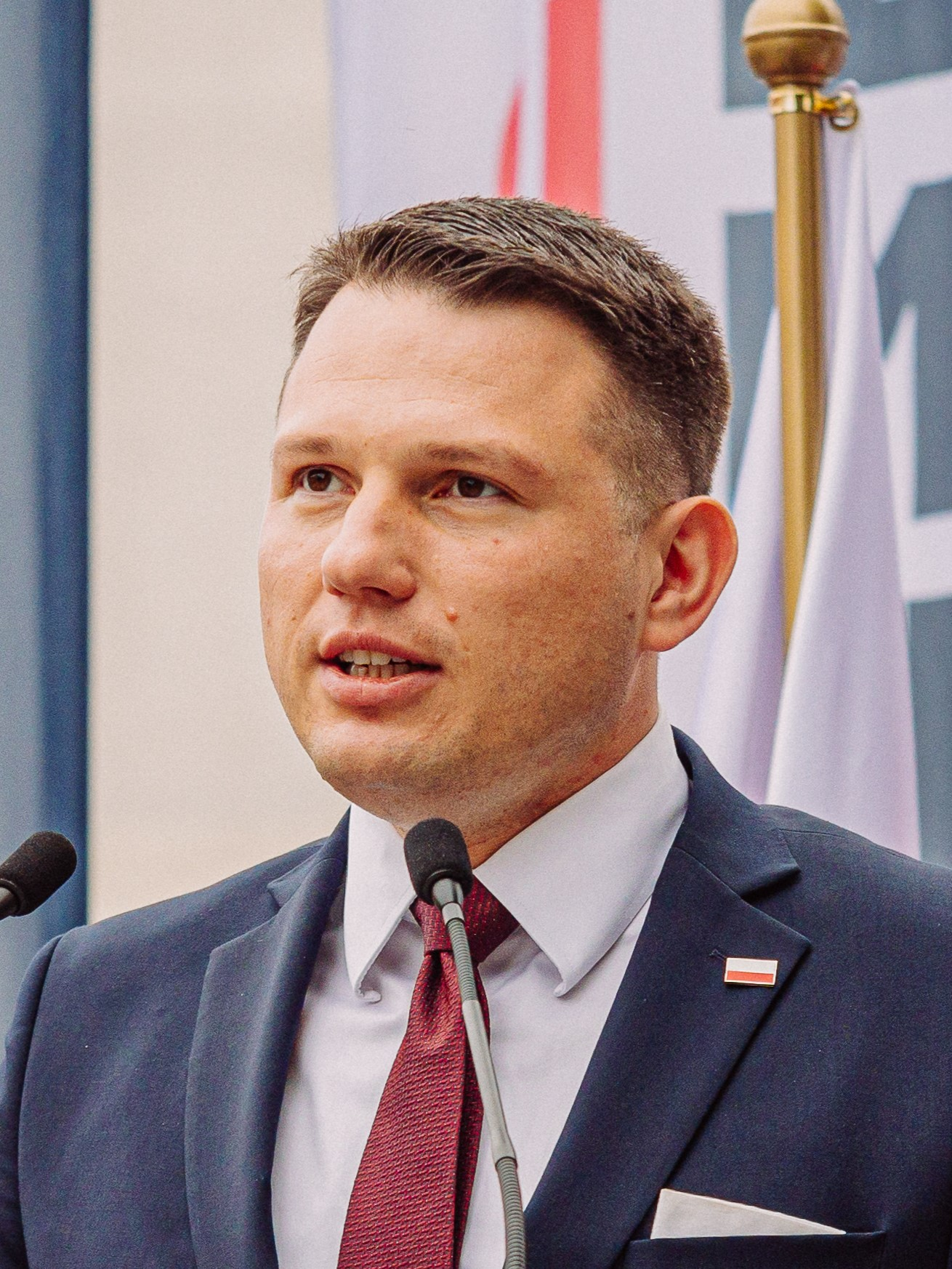
- Mentzen in 2024

Chairman of New Hope
- Incumbent
- Assumed office 15 October 2022
- Preceded by: Janusz Korwin-Mikke

Member of the Sejm
- Incumbent
- Assumed office 13 November 2023
- Constituency: Warsaw I

Personal details
- Born: 20 November 1986 (age 39) Toruń, Poland
- Party: New Hope (since 2017); Confederation (since 2018)
- Other political affiliations: Kukiz'15 (2015–2017); Real Politics Union (2007–2009)
- Children: 3
- Education: Nicolaus Copernicus University (Lic., PhD)
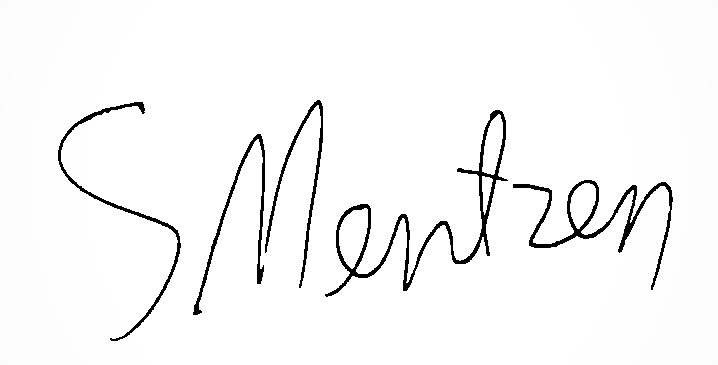
- Signature

Sławomir Jerzy Mentzen (Polish: [swaˈvɔmir ˈmɛnt͡sɛn]; born 20 November 1986) is a Polish politician, entrepreneur and tax advisor. He is often described as far-right by media and critics. He placed third in the 2025 Polish presidential election. He serves as the chairman of the libertarian political party New Hope and as one of the leaders of the far-right Confederation Liberty and Independence coalition.

== Early life and education ==
Mentzen was born in Toruń, Poland, where he completed the Academic High School in Toruń. He originally studied computer science at Jagiellonian University (UJ), although he later pursued theoretical physics and graduated with a Licentiate while also studying economic studies. He later graduated with a doctorate in economics at the Nicolaus Copernicus University. His doctoral thesis, which he defended in 2015, concerned public debt.

== Business career ==
He runs several accounting offices and owns a tax consultancy office as well as a hunting shop and a craft brewery in Toruń. He is a member of the Chamber of Commerce and Industry in Toruń and the National Chamber of Tax Advisors.

== Political career ==
Mentzen began his political career in 2007 by joining the Real Politics Union (UPR) founded by Janusz Korwin-Mikke, serving for two years as the president of the party's branch in Toruń before suspending his activities within the party. He decided to re-enter politics after Paweł Kukiz's success in 2015, seeking to get on the electoral lists of Kukiz'15.

In 2017, Mentzen was elected vice chairman of Janusz Korwin-Mikke's New Hope party, at the time still called KORWiN. He had already held important functions in the party's structures, as he was the president of the Toruń district and the chairman of the party's scientific council. In the 2018 local elections, he ran for president of Toruń. He came in fifth place with 3.94% of the votes. In October 2022, he became the new chairman of the New Hope Party after Korwin-Mikke stepped down.

In the 2023 parliamentary elections, he ran as the leader of the Confederation Liberty and Independence in the Warsaw district. He obtained a seat as an X-term member of parliament, receiving 101,269 votes (5.91% of the votes cast in the district).

Mentzen is the most popular Polish politician on TikTok, with over 40 million views.

On 17 September 2023, less than a month before the 2023 Polish parliamentary election, Instagram, a subsidiary of Meta Platforms, banned Mentzen's account, which had over 340 thousand followers, in a move that Mentzen and various members of the opposing ruling United Right coalition branded as electoral interference.

=== Political stances ===
Mentzen has been described as far-right by the media and critics. He has been a vocal critic of the European Union, calling it "totalitarian" and advocating for Poland's exit from the union. However, he currently does not have a clear stance on this solution.

Mentzen has focused on economic matters, expressing concern about the tax burden and the level of welfare spending. These issues have become central to his political agenda, resonating with voters who share similar concerns about the country's fiscal policies. Mentzen's 20-point election platform for the 2025 Polish presidential election included "no Polish troops in Ukraine", "sealed borders", "low taxes", "stopping leftist ideology", "rejection of the European Green Deal", "energy security", "defending freedom of speech", and "freeing cryptocurrencies". He evoked controversy by calling for an end to free university tuition and banning abortion even in cases of rape. Mentzen wants Poland to withdraw from the European Green Deal and opposes LGBTQ rights.

In 2019, Mentzen stated that someone could sum up his party's platform and call it the following "five points": "We don't want Jews, homosexuals, abortion, taxes or the European Union." This particular statement, made during a political marketing lecture, attracted national and international criticism and was widely condemned by political opponents as antisemitic and discriminatory.

Politicians from centrist and left-leaning parties publicly called for formal censure and, at times, for investigations into discriminatory rhetoric. Several civil society organisations and advocacy groups staged public demonstrations demanding accountability and promoting tolerance, while supporters of Mentzen argued that the media misrepresented his intent. The controversy was also addressed in the Sejm, where members debated the boundaries of political speech and the impact of such statements on Poland's international reputation. Mentzen later stated that his remarks were taken out of context and not intended as a literal political program. Still, the controversy has continued to affect his public image and is frequently cited by his critics.

=== Controversies ===
Just prior to the 2019 European Parliament election, while mocking the "Five points of PiS", Mentzen gave a controversial political marketing lecture in which he proclaimed the unofficial so-called "Five points of Confederation" as follows: "We do not want Jews, homosexuals, abortions, taxation and the European Union." He later argued that the comments were taken out of a larger performance focused on how to reach out to voters.

In the same year, Mentzen prepared a sum of 100 bills ready to be legislated under the Sejm's jurisdiction. Among them were the proposals for a prison sentence for performing an abortion, the creation of "undissolvable marriages" for those who wanted them, the legalization of light corporal punishment of children by parents, and the ending of Poland's ban on promoting fascism and using hate speech. However, shortly after publishing them online, the bills were deleted, and the hosting for the website expired. When asked, he denied having authorship over most of the project.

=== Russian invasion of Ukraine ===
Mentzen criticised the government's decision to impose a ban on Russian coal imports as part of the sanctions against Russia following its invasion of Ukraine. He states that this move was a wrong step by the Polish authorities, particularly considering the coal shortage and high prices the country is currently facing as of November 2022.

Poland heavily relies on coal for its energy needs, with 66% of its energy mix coming from coal, and about 46% of Poles heating their houses with coal. Mentzen argued that the origin of the coal should not matter to consumers, emphasizing that the priority should be ensuring affordable and accessible heating options, especially for vulnerable individuals like the elderly.

=== 2025 presidential campaign ===
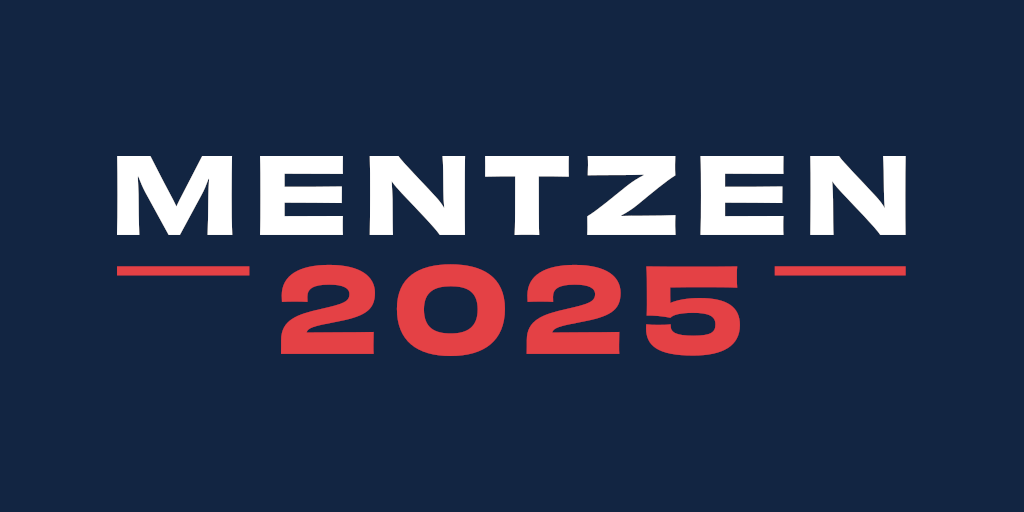
Logo for the Sławomir Mentzen 2025 presidential campaign

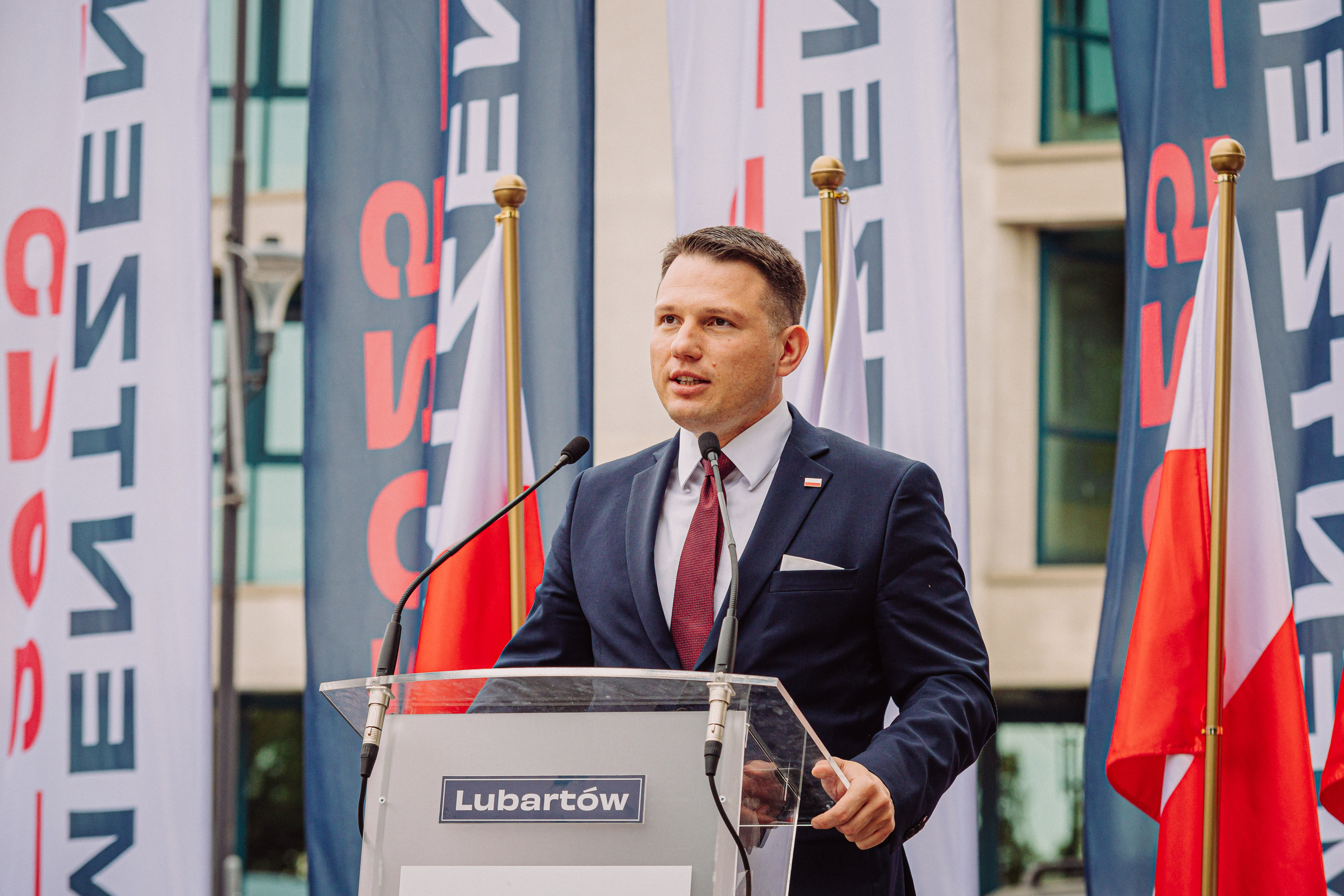
Sławomir Mentzen in 2024

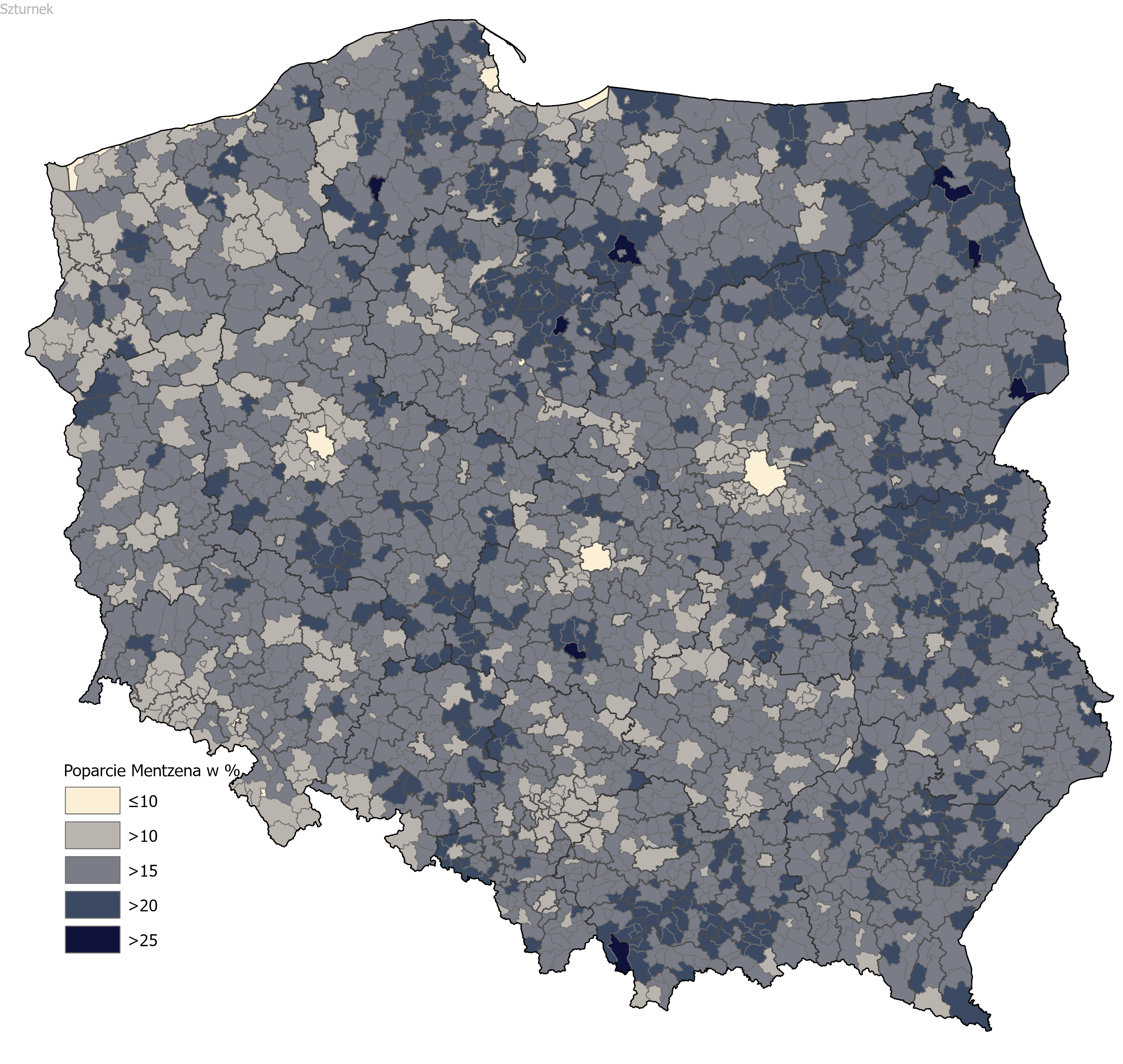
Results of Mentzen. He obtained the highest result in gmina Dubicze Cerkiewne (32.86%) and the lowest in Sopot (7.06%)

At the end of August 2024, Mentzen announced his intention to run in the 2025 presidential election and started a campaign. This action has been criticised by other politicians who state that, according to Polish electoral law, campaigns can only begin after the Marshal of the Sejm announces an act ordering the elections, thus making his campaign illegal. In response, Mentzen said that he is running a "non-electoral campaign" and that "it could just be a promotion of my face, my company, or a new product, that I have not yet announced".

During his presidential campaign he created on his YouTube channel a series called "Dzień z Mentzenem" in which he showed his average day as a member of the Sejm, candidate for President and business owner.

He did not attend the presidential debate in Końskie. He alongside many other candidates criticised the debate and Rafał Trzaskowski for inviting them to the debate only an hour and a half before the debate began for these reasons he called the debate, "a circus and a clown show".

He attended the presidential debate in Telewizja Republika which was skipped by the favourite candidate Rafał Trzaskowski. This was the first debate hosted in Telewizja Republika in the election.

He, along with all the other candidates running in the presidential election, attended a presidential debate held on 28 April 2025 in Super Express.

On 16 May 2025 he held his final campaign rally in Kraków before the mandated election silence went into effect at midnight 17 May 2025.

On the first round of voting on 18 May 2025, Mentzen placed third and won 14.8% of the vote. The only municipality he won the plurality of votes was Dubicze Cerkiewne where he received 32.86% of the vote.

=== Toruń Declaration and Presidential Candidates' Interviews ===
The Toruń Declaration was the organisation of two interviews by Sławomir Mentzen one being with Karol Nawrocki and the other being with Rafał Trzaskowski. The interview with Karol Nawrocki was held on 22 May while the interview with Rafał Trzaskowski was held on 24 May. The Toruń Declaration is an eight-point manifesto outlining key policy positions aligned with Mentzen's platform.

==== Background ====
In the first round of the 2025 Polish presidential election, Sławomir Mentzen secured third place with 14.81% of the vote, positioning himself as a potential kingmaker in the runoff between Karol Nawrocki and Rafał Trzaskowski. Mentzen invited both candidates for interviews on his platform, presenting them with an eight-point declaration to endorse which are important to his voters.

==== The Toruń Declaration Contents ====
The declaration included commitments to:

- Oppose the European Union's Green Deal.
- Reject the introduction of new taxes.
- Refuse the adoption of the euro in Poland.
- Oppose Ukraine's accession to NATO.
- Prevent the transfer of additional powers to European Union institutions.
- Maintain cash as a legal tender.
- Resist censorship and uphold freedom of speech.
- Refuse to send any Polish troops to Ukraine under any circumstances.

==== Interviews Aftermath ====
Karol Nawrocki endorsed and formally signed the declaration and stated that all of the issues are very important to him during the live interview, which was seen as a strategic alignment with Mentzen's voter base and securing Mentzen's conditional support for the second round.

Rafał Trzaskowski agreed with four of the eight points of the declaration and stated that he disagreed strongly with the other four. He refused to sign the declaration including the parts with which he had said he agreed.

In a video in which Mentzen summarised the two interviews he conducted with the candidates he did not formally endorse either. He simply told his voters to vote "for the person they think will be the best" although he did state that "he does not see a reason why anyone should vote for Trzaskowski".

The interview with Karol Nawrocki amassed around 350,000 concurrent viewers and the one with Rafał Trzaskowski amassed around 600,000 concurrent viewers which also resulted in Sławomir Mentzen's channel reaching 1 million subscribers.

Following Trzaskowski's appearance, he went out to drink beer with Mentzen (with Radosław Sikorski also being present) at Mentzen's pub in Toruń, generating accusations of Mentzen being a traitor by Confederation figures.

== Personal life ==
Mentzen is married and has three children. His paternal great-grandfather was German. Mieczysław Mentzen, Sławomir's father, is a professor of mathematics at the Nicolaus Copernicus University in Toruń.

In September 2024, he stated that he was diagnosed with Asperger syndrome, part of the autism spectrum.

As of October 2023, Sławomir Mentzen's estimated net worth is approximately 49.1 million Polish złoty, consisting of various assets, including cash, cryptocurrencies, investments, real estate, and business holdings. He is a practising Roman Catholic.
