= Complex of Silesian International Schools =

Coordinates: 50°15′32″N 18°58′13″E

- Katowice, Silesia; Poland

Information
- Type: Independent
- Established: 2007
- Head teacher: Mrs Jolanta Kałuża
- Website: international.edu.pl

The Complex of Silesian International Schools, founded in 2007 in Katowice, is an International Centre of the University of Cambridge International Examinations (CIE). Prywatne Liceum Ogolnoksztalcace im. Melchiora Wankowicza, which is a part of the Complex, offers the International Baccalaureate (IB) Diploma Programme.

== Curriculum ==
The Complex offers a curriculum for students aged 3–19 in Cambridge Primary, Checkpoint, IGCSE and IB Diploma Programmes. The language of instruction on all levels is English, but the school strongly emphasises other languages, such as Polish, Spanish and German.
