= BISC Wrocław =

Coordinates: 51.083294°N 17.015694°E

Location
- Al.Akacjowa 10–12, Wrocław 53–134, Poland; Wrocław, Dolnośląskie; Poland

Information
- Type: Independent
- Established: 2006
- Head teacher: Mr Phil Hart
- Enrolment: 204
- Campus: Suburbs
- Colours: Red, white and blue
- Website: bisc.wroclaw.pl

British International School of Wrocław (BISC Wrocław) is a co-educational private school in Wrocław, Poland. The school opened in September 2006 to provide primary and secondary educations for the growing expatriate community. BISC Wroclaw is the sister school of the British International School of Cracow (BISC).

== History ==
From September 2006, the school shared premises with a Polish sports school on ul. Trwała. In January 2009, it moved to its present location on al. Akacjowa 10–12.

== Primary section ==
The primary school section is split between the two villas, with junior classes in the smaller villa and senior classes in the larger. The school has classrooms for each year group along with a dedicated room for English as an Additional Language.

== Secondary section ==
The secondary section is situated in the larger building and has a theatre hall, dining hall, science laboratory and library. In addition to classrooms, there is an ICT suite and a staffroom. The second floor houses more classrooms for the secondary school.

== Administration ==
The School Secretary and Head of School are based on the first floor of the smaller villa. The School Administrator is based on the ground floor of the larger villa.

=== Curriculum ===
==== Key stages 1 - 3 ====
Students in Years 1 through 13 follow the Cambridge International Curriculum. Students graduate with the Cambridge International A levels. BISC Wroclaw has consistently scored outstanding results in international examinations and has graduates attending some of the best universities in the world.

==== Key stage 4 ====
The school offers iGCSE subjects at Years 9 to 11. Subjects offered include:

Mathematics
English Language and Literature
Biology
Chemistry
Physics
History
Geography
German
Polish
French
Spanish
Art
Music
Information and Communication Technology
Physical Education*

* non-examined

==== Alevel ====
Subjects offered at Advanced Subsidiary (AS) and Advanced Level (A2) include:

Mathematics
English Literature
Human Biology
Chemistry
Physics
History
Geography
Business Studies
Economics
Psychology
German
Polish
French
Spanish
Art and Design

==== Polish Education ====
BISC Wrocław also offers education to Polish Citizens through the Polsko-Brytyjska Dwujęzyczna Szkoła Podstawowa (Polish-British Bilingual Elementary School) This is a programme of lessons in accordance with Polish education law. These are scheduled to ensure students receive a complementary balance of instructions in both the British and Polish systems.

== Management ==
=== Head of school ===
Period of Service	Name
September 2006 – December 2006	Ian Scott
January 2007 – August 2009	Andy Harris and Wendy Murphy (co-heads)
September 2009 – August 2010	Andy Harris
September 2010 – June 2011	Derek Smith
September 2011 – June 2016	Wayne Billington
September 2016 - June 2017	Tom McGrath
September 2017 - August 2019	Andy Harris
September 2019 - August 2021	Joe Peck
August 2021 – Present	Phil Hart

=== Head of secondary ===
Period of Service	Name
September 2008 – August 2009	Chris Holliday
September 2009 – August 2010	Vincent Keat
September 2010 – August 2011	Ben Chell
September 2011 – August 2015	Wayne Billington
September 2015 - August 2019	Joe Peck
September 2019 - August 2021	Agnieszka Peck & Nancy Pliego Blancas (Co-head)
September 2022 - March 2024	Ayobami Peter Oluwafemi Bamgbose

=== Head of primary ===
Period of Service	Name
September 2006 – August 2008	Karen Speirs
September 2008 – present	Anna Witańska
