= British International School of Cracow =

Location
- Kraków, Malopolskie; Poland
- Coordinates: 50°03′30″N 19°55′35″E

Information
- Type: Independent
- Established: 1995
- Head teacher: Dr Stanislaw Kwiecinski
- Age: 3 to 18
- Enrolment: 210
- Language: English
- Campus: Old town
- Colours: Red, white and blue
- Website: bisc.krakow.pl

The British International School of Cracow is a co-educational private school in Kraków, Poland. It was founded on 1 September 1995 to provide expatriate children with a British education. The school accepts children from 3–19 years of age, and serves 210 students from 20 countries.

== Curriculum ==
The British International School of Cracow uses the British National Curriculum to provide students with an education in an English language environment. Foreign languages are strongly emphasised, with French, Spanish and German-speaking students offered three hours of native language instruction upon parental request. Mother-tongue instruction is also offered in Polish, Italian and Japanese. Non-fluent speakers of English are offered an English as a second language (ESL) programme.

Students can take the International Baccalaureate's IB Diploma Programme, which the school has offered since April 2006. The IB Diploma is a University entrance level qualification offered to students in Years 12 and 13 (ages 16–18).

Students may also take International General Certificate of Secondary Education exam. The school has been accredited by the University of London (Edexcel), AQA and the University of Cambridge.

It supports FS1 to IB2

== See also ==
- BISC Wrocław – a sister school in Wrocław
