= Polish student ID =

The Polish student ID (Polish: Legitymacja studencka) is a document certifying that the person is enrolled in an institution of higher education (e.g., university) in Poland.

The student ID is issued upon matriculation and is valid until the completion of the studies, unenrolment as a student, or removal of students' rights. The ID is revalidated every semester, by means of issuing a holographic sticker issued by the organizational unit of the university.

The student ID entitles the holder to discounted fares on public transportation (trains and buses). However, after expiring 26 years of age, the train discounts are no longer valid.

The electronic student ID was introduced in 2006, and combines the functions of three traditional (paper) personal documents: the paper student ID, the library card, and travel card (karta miejska).

Every Polish student ID (in form of a smart card) constitutes a valid MIFARE card.

== Gallery ==
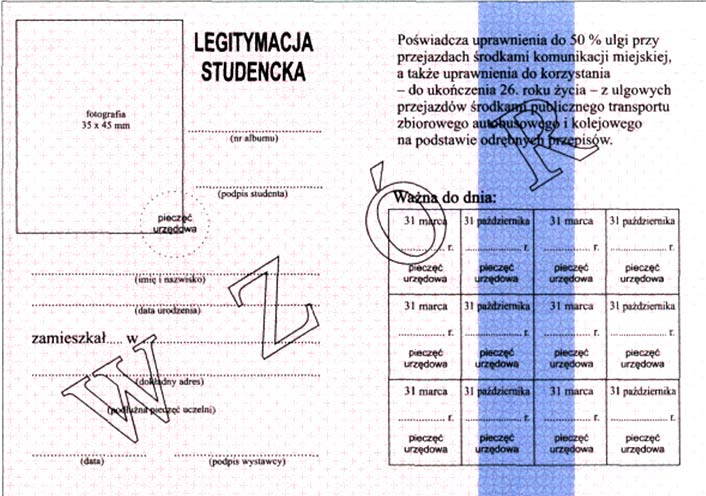
Student ID (18 TP-PR)

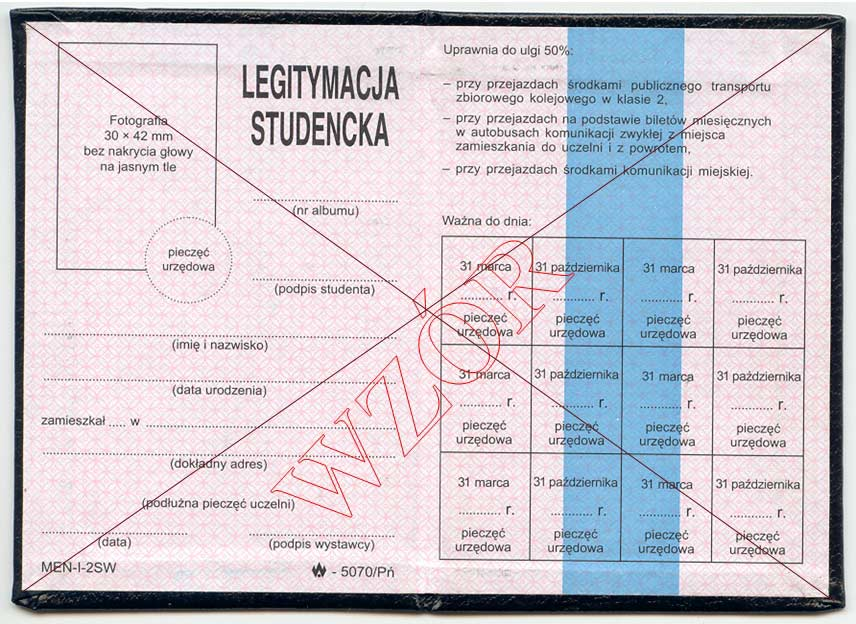
Student ID (18a TP-PR)

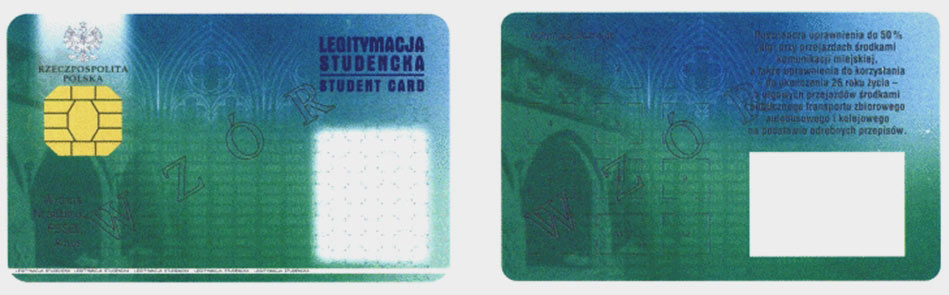
Electronic Student ID
