= Opinion polling for the 2025 Polish presidential election =

During the months leading up to the 2025 Polish presidential election (whose first round occurred on 18 May, and whose second round will occur on 1 June), various organizations carry out opinion polling to gauge voters' intentions in Poland. Results of such polls are displayed in this article.

The date range for these opinion polls are from the previous presidential election, held on 28 June 2020, to the present day. The 2025 presidential election was held on 18 May 2025, with the second round on 1 June 2025.

== Polling aggregations ==
The following table displays the most recent aggregations of polling results from different organisations.

=== First round ===
Polling Aggregator/Link	Date	Trzaskowski PO	Nawrocki PiS	Mentzen Confederation	Braun KKP	Hołownia PL2050	Zandberg Razem	Biejat NL	Stanowski ind.	Senyszyn SLD	Jakubiak WR	Others / don't know	Lead
ewybory.eu	Election result	31.36	29.54	14.81	6.34	4.99	4.86	4.23	1.24	1.09	0.77	0.77	1.82
ewybory.eu	14–16 May 2025	31.6	26.0	12.3	4.3	6.5	5.1	5.4	1.8	1.4	1.5	4.1	5.6
ewybory.eu	10–13 May 2025	32.3	26.0	12.1	4.0	6.5	5.1	5.4	1.7	1.4	1.2	3.1	6.3
ewybory.eu	3–9 May 2025	32.0	23.6	13.6	4.3	7.3	5.4	5.9	1.4	1.0	1.2	4.3	8.4
ewybory.eu	26 Apr–2 May 2025	32.6	25.1	13.1	2.4	7.0	4.5	4.9	1.8	0.7	1.4	6.5	7.5
ewybory.eu	19–25 Apr 2025	32.0	26.5	13.4	2.1	5.8	4.0	4.9	1.6	1.2	1.2	7.3	5.5
ewybory.eu	10–16 Apr 2025	32.9	24.9	15.8	2.6	6.4	3.8	3.8	1.7	0.5	1.1	6.5	8.0
ewybory.eu	5–11 Apr 2025	35.2	24.2	17.9	3.1	5.1	3.1	2.2	1.2	0.3	0.6	7.1	11.0
ewybory.eu	29 Mar–4 Apr 2025	36.4	22.2	17.6	2.1	7.6	2.7	2.8	0.6	0.5	0.5	7.0	14.2
ewybory.eu	22–28 Mar 2025	34.4	23.7	17.5	1.1	5.4	1.9	3.6	0.0	0.0	1.4	11.0	10.7
ewybory.eu	15–21 Mar 2025	35.6	23.1	19.0	1.5	4.7	2.6	2.3	2.1	0.1	0.9	8.1	12.5
ewybory.eu	8–14 Mar 2025	35.4	23.0	19.2	1.9	5.7	2.3	2.3	1.5	0.0	0.7	8.0	12.4
ewybory.eu	1–7 Mar 2025	35.4	22.7	18.0	1.9	6.0	2.7	3.7	1.2	0.0	1.1	7.3	12.7
ewybory.eu	22–28 Feb 2025	33.8	22.7	17.2	1.0	7.4	1.6	3.2	0.0	0.0	2.2	10.1	11.1
ewybory.eu	15–21 Feb 2025	34.0	24.9	15.3	2.1	5.6	2.0	2.3	0.0	0.0	1.2	8.8	8.1
ewybory.eu	8–14 Feb 2025	34.2	24.0	14.2	1.5	6.5	1.9	3.0	0.0	0.0	2.1	9.6	10.2
ewybory.eu	1–7 Feb 2025	37.3	23.9	8.9	1.7	6.8	1.1	5.0	0.0	0.0	1.2	14.1	13.4
ewybory.eu	25–31 Jan 2025	34.6	24.5	12.6	1.6	7.1	1.5	3.5	0.0	0.0	1.4	13.2	10.1
ewybory.eu	18–24 Jan 2025	35.5	25.2	13.2	2.7	7.5	1.5	3.3	0.0	0.2	1.3	9.6	10.3
ewybory.eu	11–17 Jan 2025	34.6	25.5	11.5	0.0	7.9	1.8	3.3	0.0	0.0	1.6	12.3	9.1
ewybory.eu	4–10 Jan 2025	32.4	26.8	12.6	0.0	6.6	1.2	3.5	0.0	0.0	1.7	15.2	5.6
ewybory.eu	21–27 Dec 2024	36.0	27.5	9.9	0.0	10.2	0.0	6.0	0.0	0.0	1.5	8.9	8.5
ewybory.eu	14–20 Dec 2024	36.6	24.7	11.6	0.0	8.5	0.0	3.6	0.0	0.0	1.9	13.1	11.9
ewybory.eu	7–13 Dec 2024	39.4	29.5	10.0	0.0	9.3	0.0	4.0	0.0	0.0	1.6	6.2	9.9
ewybory.eu	30 Nov–6 Dec 2024	36.9	30.3	7.3	0.0	7.9	0.0	4.8	0.0	0.0	0.5	12.3	6.6
ewybory.eu	23–29 Nov 2024	38.7	21.1	11.4	0.0	9.3	0.0	5.8	0.0	0.0	2.5	11.2	17.6

=== Second round – Nawrocki v. Trzaskowski ===
Polling Aggregator/Link	Date	Nawrocki PiS	Trzaskowski PO	Lead
ewybory.eu	Election result	50.89	49.11	1.78
ewybory.eu	24–30 May 2025	49.7	50.3	0.6
ewybory.eu	18–23 May 2025	50.0	50.0	Tie
ewybory.eu	10–16 May 2025	46.1	53.9	7.8
ewybory.eu	3–9 May 2025	43.7	56.3	12.6
ewybory.eu	26 Apr–2 May 2025	44.4	55.6	11.2
ewybory.eu	19–25 Apr 2025	45.6	54.4	8.8
ewybory.eu	12–18 Apr 2025	45.9	54.1	8.2
ewybory.eu	5–11 Apr 2025	44.3	55.7	11.4
ewybory.eu	29 Mar–4 Apr 2025	40.8	59.2	18.4
ewybory.eu	22–28 Mar 2025	42.7	57.3	14.6
ewybory.eu	15–21 Mar 2025	42.3	57.7	15.4
ewybory.eu	8–14 Mar 2025	42.7	57.3	14.6
ewybory.eu	1–7 Mar 2025	44.1	55.9	11.8
ewybory.eu	22–28 Feb 2025	43.5	56.5	13
ewybory.eu	15–21 Feb 2025	44.1	55.9	11.8

==== Daily average ====
Polling Aggregator/Link	Date	Nawrocki PiS	Trzaskowski PO	Lead
ewybory.eu	Election result	50.89	49.11	1.78
ewybory.eu	30 May	50.1	49.9	0.2
ewybory.eu	29 May	49.8	50.2	0.4
ewybory.eu	28 May	49.7	50.3	0.6
ewybory.eu	27 May	49.9	50.1	0.2
ewybory.eu	26 May	49.4	50.6	1.2
ewybory.eu	25 May	49.3	50.7	1.4
ewybory.eu	24 May	49.7	50.3	0.6
ewybory.eu	23 May	49.7	50.3	0.6
ewybory.eu	22 May	50.6	49.4	1.2
ewybory.eu	21 May	50.5	49.5	1
ewybory.eu	20 May	50.5	49.5	1
ewybory.eu	19 May	51.1	48.9	2.2

== First round ==
LOESS curve for the 2025 Polish presidential election, first round.

Polling firm/Link	Fieldwork date	Sample size	Nawrocki PiS	Trzaskowski PO	Hołownia PL2050	Biejat NL	Zandberg Razem	Mentzen Confederation	Braun KKP	Jakubiak WR	Stanowski ind.	Woch BS	Senyszyn SLD	Maciak RDiP	Bartoszewicz ind.	Others	Don't know	Lead
2025 presidential election	Election result	19,603,784	29.54	31.36	4.99	4.23	4.86	14.81	6.34	0.77	1.24	0.09	1.09	0.19	0.49			1.82
Ipsos (2nd late poll) / TVP, TVN24, Polsat News	19 May 2025	–	29.7	31.2	4.9	4.1	4.8	14.5	6.3	0.8	1.3	0.1	1.4	0.4	0.5			1.5
Ipsos (late poll) / TVP, TVN24, Polsat News	19 May 2025	–	29.1	31.1	4.9	4.1	5.2	14.8	6.3	0.8	1.3	0.1	1.4	0.4	0.5			2.0
OGB (exit poll) / TV Republika	18 May 2025	92,108	29.8	31.6	4.7	4.4	6.0	14.0	5.4	0.7	1.3	0.1	1.3	0.2	0.5			1.8
Ipsos (exit poll) / TVP, TVN24, Polsat News	18 May 2025	–	29.1	30.8	4.8	4.1	5.2	15.4	6.2	0.8	1.3	0.1	1.3	0.4	0.5			1.7
OGB	16 May 2025	1,000	28.68	32.89	4.72	4.30	4.45	14.21	5.87	1.73	1.38	0.05	1.04	0.26	0.42		1.00	4.21
Opinia24 / "Fakty" TVN, TVN24	14–15 May 2025	1,002	25	29	7	6	7	12	4	2	2	0	2	0	1		3	4
IBRiS / Polsat News	13–15 May 2025	1,000	25.3	31.1	6.2	5.7	4.6	10.8	3.5	1.4	1.5	0.2	1.9	0.2	0.4		7.1	5.8
United Surveys / WP.pl	13–15 May 2025	1,500	26.6	31.5	7.5	6.7	4.4	11.7	4.1	2.0	1.8		2.4			1.3		4.9
IPSOS / TVP Info	13–15 May 2025	1,000	24	28	6	5	6	13	5	2	2	0	1	1	1		6	4
Pollster / "SE.pl"	13–15 May 2025	1,697	26.9	34.2	6.4	4.9	5.4	13.1	4.3	0.9	1.7	0.2	1.2	0.2	0.6			7.3
Research Partner	13–14 May 2025	1,080	24.8	32.4	8.1	5.6	4.4	11.8	2.6	0.9	2.1		1.0			0.7	5.5	7.6
Opinia24 / RMF FM	12–14 May 2025	1,003	25.0	29.7	6.1	6.0	5.5	10.5	5.4	1.5	1.7	0.0	1.3	0.7	0.5		6.2	4.7
CBOS	5–14 May 2025	2,081	27.5	32.7	6.2	4.9	5.7	13.7	4.4	1.5	0.9	0.1	1.6	0.2	0.5			5.2
IBRiS / Onet	12–13 May 2025	1,072	26.4	32.6	5.3	6.0	3.4	10.8	2.7	1.0	1.6	0.2	1.5	0.2	0.2		8.0	6.2
IBRiS / "RZ"	11–12 May 2025	1,073	25.2	32.3	7.9	5.5	4.1	11.2	2.5	0.9	2.4	0.1	1.0	0.0	0.5		6.4	7.1
IBRiS / Polskie Radio 24	10–11 May 2025	1,067	23.6	31.5	8.6	6.3	5.4	12.6	2.6	1.1	1.6	0.0	0.9	0.4	0.3		5.1	7.9
ewybory.eu	22 Apr – 11 May 2025	14,815	30.16	33.24	5.99	3.60	4.54	13.36	3.97	1.09	2.08	0.13	1.51	0.08	0.24			3.08
OGB	7–10 May 2025	1,000	30.41	36.45	4.20	3.75	4.78	12.31	3.66		1.19		1.58					6.04
IBRiS / "Polityka"	7–10 May 2025	2,000	21.6	33.7	7.1	5.8	5.6	11.8	3.4	1.1	1.2	0.2	1.2	0.2	0.8		6.3	12.1
Pollster / "SE.pl"	7–8 May 2025	1,077	22.70	32.26	8.36	5.52	7.21	13.58	5.30	0.89	2.03		1.42	0.07	0.66			9.56
United Surveys / WP.pl	7 May 2025	1,000	23.2	33.2	7.5	6.1	3.7	13.6	3.5	1.2	1.6					1.2	5.2	10.0
Opinia24 / "Fakty" TVN, TVN24	6–7 May 2025	1,012	25	31	5	6	5	14	4	3	1	0	2	0	1		2	6
Opinia24 / "Newsweek"	5–7 May 2025	1,001	25	30	7	6	5	13	4				1				5	5
United Surveys / WP.pl	28–29 Apr 2025	1,000	24.7	31.6	8.0	5.6	4.3	12.8	2.0	1.5	2.5					1.0	6.02	6.9
Pollster / "SE.pl"	28–29 Apr 2025	1,007	25	33	7	4	6	15	4	1	2	1	1	1	1			8
IBRiS / Polskie Radio 24	25–26 Apr 2025	1,070	25.6	33.2	6.1	5.1	3.2	11.5	1.4	1.6	1.1	0.0	1.2	0.0	0.2		9.8	7.6
CBOS	22–24 Apr 2025	1,001	27	31	4	4	4	16	2	1	2	<0.5	1	0	1		7	4
Opinia24 / "Fakty" TVN, TVN24	Apr 2025	–	26	32	6	4	5	15	4	1	2		1				1	6
United Surveys / WP.pl	17–19 Apr 2025	1,000	27.6	31.7	7.1	6.4	4.4	11.3	1.0	1.3	1.4	0.0	1.4	0.2	0.3		5.9	4.1
Pollster / TV Republika	17–18 Apr 2025	1,007	25	33	8	3	5	15	5	1	3					2		8
IBRiS / "Polityka"	16–17 Apr 2025	1,067	24.9	30.4	7.3	4.3	3.3	12.9	1.3	0.9	2.0		0.9	0.2	0.4		11.2	5.5
IBRiS / Polsat News	16–17 Apr 2025	1,000	25.6	30.8	6.6	5.6	3.6	12.4	1.3	1.2	1.3	0.0	1.0	0.2	0.4		9.9	5.2
Pollster / "SE.pl"	15–16 Apr 2025	1,003	24	34	8	3	5	16	4	1	3		1		1			10
Opinia24	14–16 Apr 2025	1,002	21.6	34.1	6.1	3.2	4.3	12.9	3.0	1.6	2.4	0.0	0.6	0.2	0.5	0.3	9.3	12.5
IPSOS / TVP Info	14–16 Apr 2025	1,000	22	28	7	4	6	15	4	1	3		1	0	1		8	6
OGB	09–14 Apr 2025	1,001	29.56	35.53	3.44	1.87	1.77	20.43	4.67		1.19							5.97
Research Partner	11–13 Apr 2025	1,080	22.7	34.8	6.7	3.4	4.2	15.8		2.0						3.9	6.4	12.1
United Surveys / WP.pl	12 Apr 2025	1,000	25.5	33.5	9.1	6.3	1.3	13.4	1.6		1.1					0.4	7.8	8.0
Opinia24 / "Fakty" TVN, TVN24	Apr 2025	–	22	33	5	2	5	15	4	2	1		0		1		10	11
CBOS	7–9 Apr 2025	1,000	25	33	4	2	5	17	3	1	1	0	<0.5		<0.5	1	7	8
Opinia24 / RMF FM	7–9 Apr 2025	1,000	20.1	31.5	5.8	1.5	2.7	14.7	3.5	1.0	2.4	0.0	0.4	0.2	0.7	1.1 (Note: Romuald Starosielec (RNP) – 0.0, Paweł Tanajno (PL!SP) – 0.0)	14.5	11.4
United Surveys / WP.pl	4–6 Apr 2025	1,000	20.1	38.3	7.1	2.7	1.8	18.8	1.1		1.6					0.0	8.5	18.2
Opinia24 / ZET	2–6 Apr 2025	1,000	23	36	7	3	3	15	3	1	0				1		7	13
IBRiS / "Rz"	4–5 Apr 2025	1,068	22.6	36.2	8.3	2.6	2.1	17.4	2.1		0.8		0.6				7.2	13.6
Pollster / "SE.pl"	31 Mar–1 Apr 2025	1,007	23	35	8	3	4	19	3	1		0.26	0.40	0.42	1.12			12
Research Partner / Business Insider	21–24 Mar 2025	–	22.2	35.5	5.7	2.9	2.2	17.0		2.2						3.5	8.8	13.3
United Surveys / WP.pl	21–23 Mar 2025	1,000	25.3	33.2	5.0	4.4	1.5	18.0	2.3	0.6						0.9	8.8	7.9
Opinia24	17–21 Mar 2025	1,000	20.4	36.3	4.6	2.3	2.3	18.0	1.9	0.8	2.2					2.2	9.0	15.9
CBOS	17–20 Mar 2025	1,003	23	34	4	2	3	21	2	1	2					1	7	11
IBRiS / "Wydarzenia" Polsat	13–16 Mar 2025	1,000	25.9	36.4	5.4	2.6	2.5	18.1	0.5	0.9	2.2						5.4	10.5
IPSOS / TVP Info	11–13 Mar 2025	1,000	21	36	6	2	3	17	2	1	2					0	9	15
Opinia24 / RMF FM	10–13 Mar 2025	1,000	19.5	32.0	5.7	1.8	1.2	18.9	3.0	0.6	1.4	0.0	0.2			1.5 (Note: Piotr Szumlewicz (ind.) – 0.0)	14.3	12.5
Social Changes / wPolsce24	8–10 Mar 2025	–	23	35	7	3	2	16	4	2	1					7	7	12
Opinia24 / More in Common	4–10 Mar 2025	1,148	23	38	7	3	1	18	3		1					1	5	15
United Surveys / WP.pl	7–9 Mar 2025	1,000	27.1	35.9	3.6	2.1	3.1	19.4	1.1	0.9						0.0	6.8	8.8
Pollster / "SE.pl"	7–9 Mar 2025	1,015	21	37	8	3	2	22	3		2					2		15
CBOS	3–6 Mar 2025	1,000	23	35	5	2	3	21	2	1	1					0	7	12
IBRiS / "Polityka"	4–5 Mar 2025	1,000	22.3	35.7	6.9	5.3	2.4	15.0	1.7	1.2	1.4						9.1	13.4
SW Research / Wprost	25–26 Feb 2025	809	16.5	33.6	7.9	1.8	2.6	18.9	2.9	2.2	2.8					1.0	9.9	14.7
Research Partner / Wprost	21–24 Feb 2025	1,050	24.7	33.7	7.2	3.0	1.4	16.8		1.8							8.2	9.0
United Surveys / WP.pl	21–24 Feb 2025	1,000	25.7	34.1	7.1	4.4	1.0	16.2	0.6	2.7	1.6		0.0			0.0 (Note: Piotr Szumlewicz (ind.) – 0.0)	6.5	8.4
Ipsos / Liberté!	19–21 Feb 2025	1,000	25	32	6	2	3	15	2	1	3					1	8	7
IBRiS / "Wydarzenia" Polsat	19–21 Feb 2025	1,000	26.5	35.2	6.2	3.3	1.4	15.7	0.4	1.0	0.5						9.9	8.7
Opinia24	17–21 Feb 2025	1,001	24.1	34.9	4.2	2	2.7	13.6	2.1	1.7	1.3					2.7	10.8	10.8
CBOS	17–20 Feb 2025	1,002	25	34	5	2	2	17	3	1	3	0	0	0		0 (Note: Piotr Szumlewicz (ind.), Dawid Jackiewicz (ind.), Dominika Jasińska (ind.), Wiesław Lewicki (NK), Wojciech Papis (B), Aldona Skirgiełło (SRP), Romuald Starosielec (RNP), Paweł Tanajno (PL!SP), Krzysztof Tołwiński (Front) – 0)	7	9
IPSOS / TVP Info	17–18 Feb 2025	651	24	33	7	2	2	15	3	1	3					0	9	9
Social Changes / wPolsce24	Feb 2025	–	24	38	8	6	1	11	1	1	3					1	6	14
Opinia24 / RMF FM	10–13 Feb 2025	1,000	21.7	30.9	4.7	2.1	2.0	16.8		2.8	1.6	0.0	0.5			3.0 (Note: Piotr Szumlewicz (ind.) – 0.2)	14.0	9.2
Pollster / "SE.pl"	8–10 Feb 2025	1,077	25	35	8	2	2	16	3	2	5					2		10
United Surveys / WP.pl	7–9 Feb 2025	1,000	25.3	36.7	6.6	5.0	1.7	9.8	1.5	1.6	2.9					0.5	8.4	11.4
IBRiS / Onet	31 Jan–2 Feb 2025	1,068	23.9	37.3	6.8	5.0	1.1	8.9	1.7	1.2	3.0						11.0	13.4
Opinia24 / ZET	23–29 Jan 2025	1,000	24	32	7	3	2	15	3	1	4	0	0			1 (Note: Piotr Szumlewicz (ind.) – 0)	7	8
Research Partner	24–27 Jan 2025	1,060	24.6	34.1	8.3	2.1	1.2	13.1		1.9						4.4	10.3	9.5
United Surveys / WP.pl	24–26 Jan 2025	1,000	25.0	37.8	6.0	5.6	1.2	9.7	2.0	1.4	2.9	0.0	0.1	0.0		0.2 (Note: Piotr Szumlewicz (ind.) – 0.2, Katarzyna Cichos (ind.) – 0.0, Wiesław Lewicki (NK) – 0.0)	8.1	12.8
Opinia24	20–24 Jan 2025	1,000	22.1	35.3	6.8	2.2	1.5	13.2	2.9	0.9	0.2					2.2 (Note: Piotr Szumlewicz (ind.) – 0.0)	12.7	13.2
IBRiS / Polityka	17–24 Jan 2025	1,000	27.1	38.9	6.4	4.2	0.9	8.9	1.4	1.2	2.5						8.5	11.8
OGB	21–23 Jan 2025	1,000	31.73	35.51	5.35	3.14	0.52	15.68	3.37	2.13	2.57							3.78
SW Research / Wprost	20–21 Jan 2025	–	17.0	32.9	6.9	3.4	2.7	13.1	2.2	1.1		0.1	1.1			1.8 (Note: Piotr Szumlewicz (ind.) – 0.9, Katarzyna Cichos (ind.) – 0.9)	17.7	15.9
IBRiS / "Wydarzenia" Polsat	16–19 Jan 2025	1,000	28.9	35.0	8.9	5.0	0.7	11.5	2.2	1.3		0.0				0.0 (Note: Piotr Szumlewicz (ind.) – 0.0)	6.4	6.1
Pollster / "SE.pl"	17–18 Jan 2025	1,004	27	37	11	3	2	14	3	1		1				1 (Note: Piotr Szumlewicz (ind.) – 1)		10
IPSOS / TVP Info	14–16 Jan 2025	1,000	22	32	9	2	2	10		2		0				3 (Note: Katarzyna Cichos (ind.) – 2, Piotr Szumlewicz (ind.) – 1)	15	10
United Surveys / WP.pl	10–12 Jan 2025	1,000	29.0	34.2	6.7	4.6	1.5	13.0		1.2		0.0				0.2 (Note: Piotr Szumlewicz (ind.) – 0.2)	9.6	5.2
Opinia24 / RMF FM	7–9 Jan 2025	1,000	22.6	29.8	7.2	3.9	0.4	13.2		1.4		0.5				5.6 (Note: Piotr Szumlewicz (ind.) – 1.0)	15.6	7.2
CBOS	7–8 Jan 2025	1,000	31	35	6	3	2	12		2		0				1 (Note: Piotr Szumlewicz (ind.) – 0)	7	4
United Surveys / WP.pl	20–22 Dec 2024	1,000	28.8	36.2	10.2	5.8		10.1		1.3							7.6	7.4
IBRiS / "Wydarzenia" Polsat	19–21 Dec 2024	1,000	26.2	35.7	10.1	6.1		9.6		1.6						0.0 (Note: Piotr Szumlewicz (ind.) – 0.0)	10.8	9.5
IPSOS / TVP Info	17–18 Dec 2024	–	22	35	8	5		14		3		0				1 (Note: Romuald Starosielec (RNP) – 0)	12	13
Opinia24 / RMF FM	Dec 2024	1,000	23.3	38.6	7.4	2.6		10.7		1.3						6.6	9.5	15.3
Pollster / "SE.pl"	10–11 Dec 2024	1,005	28.70	41.96	10.67	3.26		12.68		2.73								13.26
United Surveys / WP.pl	6–8 Dec 2024	1,000	30.3	36.9	7.9	4.8		7.3		0.5							12.3	6.6
SW Research / Wprost	Nov 2024	–	13.1	38.6	8.5			11.8		3.7							24.2	25.5
Opinia24 / TVN24	Nov 2024	–	26	41	9			12								8	4	15

=== Hypothetical polling ===
Hypothetical polling before confirmed candidates

Polling firm/Link	Fieldwork date	Sample size	Błaszczak PiS	Bocheński PiS	Czarnek PiS	Jaki PiS	Morawiecki PiS	Nawrocki PiS	Witek PiS	Sikorski PO	Trzaskowski PO	Tusk PO	Hołownia PL2050	Kosiniak-Kamysz PSL	Biedroń NL	Dziemianowicz-Bąk NL	Biejat Razem/NL	Zandberg Razem	Bosak Confederation	Mentzen Confederation	Jakubiak WR	Others	Don't know	Lead
Pollster / "SE.pl"	25–26 Nov 2024	1,015						21			35		10		4					11	4		15	14
United Surveys / WP.pl	22–24 Nov 2024	1,000						24.5			40.4		9.2			7.5				10.7	2.2		5.5	15.9
United Surveys / WP.pl	21 Nov 2024	1,000	27.8								35.8		10.9			5.1				9.9			10.5	8.0
United Surveys / WP.pl	21 Nov 2024	1,000	28.9							32.3			12.0			6.7				9.8			10.3	3.4
United Surveys / WP.pl	8–10 Nov 2024	1,000			27.2						34.8		10.6			6.5				10.7	2.2		8.0	7.6
United Surveys / WP.pl	8–10 Nov 2024	1,000			27.5					29.4			10.5			8.5				11.5	2.0		10.6	1.9
United Surveys / WP.pl	11–13 Oct 2024	1,000						26.6			39.4		11.4			5.9				9.3			7.4	12.8
United Surveys / WP.pl	11–13 Oct 2024	1,000						26.0		25.5			15.1			8.5				13.0			11.9	0.5
IBRiS / Rzeczpospolita	11–12 Oct 2024	1,071						22.2			34.2		10.2			7.7				8.6		3.7 (Note: Paulina Matysiak (Razem) – 3.7)	13.4	12.0
IBRiS / Onet	10 Sep 2024	1,000					26.4				33.0		8.8				4.9			8.4		4.1 (Note: Jacek Siewiera (ind.) – 4.1)	14.3	6.6
IBRiS / Onet	10 Sep 2024	1,000	23.8								32.9		8.6				4.9			8.1		7.6 (Note: Jacek Siewiera (ind.) – 7.6)	14.0	9.1
IBRiS / Onet	10 Sep 2024	1,000						17.2			34.8		8.8				4.9			9.2		7.3 (Note: Jacek Siewiera (ind.) – 7.3)	17.7	17.6
United Surveys / WP.pl	26–28 Jul 2024	1,000					27.6				32.4		11.2			7.9			15.6				5.3	4.8
United Surveys / DGP, RMF	26–28 Jul 2024	1,000					29.3				34.8		10.1			8.4				7.9		2.0	7.4	5.5
IPSOS / DoRzeczy.pl	1–3 Jul 2024	1,000				27					33		11	7						13			9	6
IPSOS / DoRzeczy.pl	1–3 Jul 2024	1,000					28				32		11	6						15			8	4
United Surveys / WP.pl	7–9 Jun 2024	1,000					24.8				29.2		13.6			2.6			6.6			7.1 (Note: Dorota Gawryluk (ind.) – 7.1)	16.1	4.4
United Surveys / WP.pl	24–26 May 2024	1,000					25.6				29.2		10.2			3.4			7.9			8.2 (Note: Dorota Gawryluk (ind.) – 8.2)	15.5	3.6
United Surveys / WP.pl	10–12 May 2024	1,000					25.5				29.6		13.8			4.4			9.3				17.4	4.1
United Surveys / WP.pl	6–7 Apr 2024	1,000					22.4				29.0		17.1		3.3				3.8	4.7		8.6 (Note: Beata Szydło (PiS) – 8.6)	11.2	6.6
IPSOS / OKO.press, TOK FM	22–26 Feb 2024	1,000					25				26		16			4			10			3 (Note: Krzysztof Stanowski (ind.) – 3)	9	1
United Surveys / WP.pl	23–25 Feb 2024	1,000					25.9				30.8		23.1		4.5				8.0				7.7	4.9
Pollster / SE.pl	11 Feb 2024	1,060					20.92				32.53		25.21	5.45				2.65	7.66			5.58 (Note: Dorota Gawryluk (ind.) – 1.89, Krzysztof Stanowski (ind.) – 1.11)		7.32
United Surveys / WP.pl	10–11 Feb 2024	1,000					24.3				22.2		24.8		1.3				1.9	6.5		9.0 (Note: Beata Szydło (PiS) – 9.0)	10.0	0.5
IBRiS / Radio Zet	9–10 Feb 2024	1,070		16.1							28.3		24.0									5.2 (Note: Krzysztof Stanowski (ind.) – 3.2, Dorota Gawryluk (ind.) – 0.2)	26.4	4.3
IBRiS / Onet	26–27 Jan 2024	1,070					24.9				25.8		24.6	4.3	3.5				8.0				8.9	0.9
Pollster / SE.pl	17 Dec 2023	1,033	27								30		20									5	18	3
United Surveys / DGP, RMF	8–10 Dec 2023	1,000	2.6				9.9		1.2		24.5	0.9	11.9	1.2				2.7	2.2	1.6		33.1 (Note: Adam Bodnar (ind.) – 1.4, Kacper Płażyński (PiS) – 1.3, Jarosław Kaczyński (PiS) – 1.3)	6.6	12.6
IBRiS / Onet	24–25 Nov 2023	–					29.9				34.6		11.7	6.3						7.2		1.5 (Note: Joanna Scheuring-Wielgus (NL) – 1.5)	8.9	4.7
IBRiS / Onet	24–25 Nov 2023	–							21.4			25.6	16.7	8.6		8.0				8.0			11.7	4.2
United Surveys / WP.pl	17–19 Nov 2023	1,000					19.0				33.8		13.4		4.5				8.3			18.3 (Note: Beata Szydło (PiS) – 7.7)	2.7	14.8

== Second round ==
LOESS curve for the 2025 Polish presidential election, second round.

=== Nawrocki v. Trzaskowski ===
Polling firm/Link	Fieldwork date	Sample size	Nawrocki PiS	Trzaskowski PO	Don't know	Abstain	Lead
2025 presidential election	Election result	20,844,163	50.89	49.11			1.78
Ipsos (2nd late poll) / TVP, TVN24, Polsat News	2 June 2025	–	51	49			2
Ipsos (late poll) / TVP, TVN24, Polsat News	1 June 2025	–	50.7	49.3			1.4
OGB (exit poll) / TV Republika	1 June 2025	100,567	49.83	50.17			0.34
Ipsos (exit poll) / TVP, TVN24, Polsat News	1 June 2025	–	49.7	50.3			0.6
AtlasIntel	27–30 May 2025	2,596	47.4	47.6	1.4	0.9	0.2
United Surveys / WP.pl	25–30 May 2025	1,800	47.7	47.3	5		0.4
Social Changes / wnet.fm Top to bottom: 75%, 71%, 64% turnout scenarios	28–29 May 2025	1,060	50.9	49.1			1.8
Social Changes / wnet.fm Top to bottom: 75%, 71%, 64% turnout scenarios	28–29 May 2025	1,060	49.95	50.05			0.10
Social Changes / wnet.fm Top to bottom: 75%, 71%, 64% turnout scenarios	28–29 May 2025	1,060	50.5	49.5			1.0
OGB / “WP.pl”	28–29 May 2025	1,000	50.63	49.37			1.26
Pollster / “SE.pl”	28–29 May 2025	1,039	45.60	47.97	6.43		2.37
IBRiS / Polsat News	27–29 May 2025	1,000	48.1	49.1	2.8		1
Opinia24 / "Fakty" TVN, TVN24	27–29 May 2025	1,500	46.3	47.4	3.6		1.1
IPSOS / "19:30" TVP Info	26–29 May 2025	1,000	48	49	3		1
Research Partner / ARIADNA	27–28 May 2025	1,080	46.1	45.8	8.1		0.3
IPSOS / “OKO.press”	27–28 May 2025	1,000	47	48	5		1
IBRiS / Onet	26–28 May 2025	1,090	46.0	47.7	6.3		1.7
CBOS	26–28 May 2025	1,000	49.7	50.3			0.6
Opinia24 / RMF FM	25–27 May 2025	1,000	45.9	47.5	6.6		1.6
United Surveys / “WP.pl”	25–26 May 2025	1,000	45.0	47.4	7.6		2.4
Opinia24 / Radio ZET	23–26 May 2025	1,021	48	51	1		3
Opinia24 / "Fakty" TVN, TVN24	May 2025	–	46	47	5		1
Pollster / “SE.pl”	25 May 2025	1,011	43.61	45.7	10.69		2.09
IBRiS / Polskie Radio 24	25 May 2025	1,070	44.9	45.7	9.4		0.8
OGB	22–24 May 2025	800	48	45.5	6.5		2.5
IPSOS / "19:30" TVP Info	20–22 May 2025	1,000	47	47	6		Tie
Opinia24	19–21 May 2025	624	47	45	8		2
Opinia24 / "Fakty" TVN, TVN24	18 May 2025	–	44	46	10		2
OGB (1st round exit poll) / TV Republika	18 May 2025	92,108	38.0	47.2	14.8		9.2
OGB	16 May 2025	800	51.5	48.5			3
Opinia24 / "Fakty" TVN, TVN24	14–15 May 2025	1,002	45	48	7		3
IPSOS / TVP Info	13–15 May 2025	1,000	45	49	6		4
IBRiS / Polsat News	13–15 May 2025	1,000	37.6	50.2	5.4	6.8	12.6
United Surveys / “WP.pl”	13–15 May 2025	1,500	43.8	56.2			12.4
AtlasIntel	11–14 May 2025	1,827	45.2	46.5	8.3		1.3
Opinia24 / RMF FM	12–14 May 2025	1,003	44.4	48.5	7.1		4.1
IBRiS / Onet	12–13 May 2025	1,072	36.3	53.9	5.3	4.6	17.6
IBRiS / "RZ"	11–12 May 2025	1,073	38.4	53.9	7.7		15.5
ewybory.eu	22 Apr–11 May 2025	14,815	45.43	48.64	5.93		3.21
IBRiS / Polskie Radio 24	10–11 May 2025	1,067	36.6	55.6	3.1	4.7	19.0
IBRiS / "Polityka"	7–10 May 2025	2,000	37.7	54.5	7.8		16.8
Pollster / “SE.pl”	7-8 May 2025	1,077	45	55			10
United Surveys / WP.pl	7 May 2025	1,000	39.1	57.7	3.2		18.6
Opinia24 / "Fakty" TVN, TVN24	6–7 May 2025	1,012	41	50	9		9
Opinia24 / "Newsweek"	5–7 May 2025	1,001	45	53	2		8
United Surveys / WP.pl	28–29 Apr 2025	1,000	39.5	53.3	7.2		13.8
Pollster / "SE.pl"	28–29 Apr 2025	1,007	46	54			8
Opinia24 / "Fakty" TVN, TVN24	Apr 2025	–	45	51	4		6
United Surveys / WP.pl	17–19 Apr 2025	1,000	40.2	50.5	9.3		10.3
IBRiS / Polsat News	16–17 Apr 2025	1,000	40.9	48.1	5.4	5.6	7.2
Pollster / “SE.pl”	15–16 Apr 2025	1,003	45	55			10
Opinia24	14–16 Apr 2025	1,002	41.6	52.4	6		10.8
IPSOS / TVP Info	14–16 Apr 2025	1,000	43	50	7		7
OGB	9–14 Apr 2025	1,001	49.3	50.7			1.4
United Surveys / WP.pl	12 Apr 2025	1,000	38.0	55.7	6.3		17.7
Opinia24 / "Fakty" TVN, TVN24	Apr 2025	–	38	44	18		6
CBOS	7–9 Apr 2025	1,000	44	52	4		8
Opinia24 / RMF FM	7–9 Apr 2025	1,000	35.1	42.5	10.5	11.9	7.4
United Surveys / WP.pl	4–6 Apr 2025	1,000	33.6	56.1	10.3		22.5
Opinia24 / ZET	2–6 Apr 2025	1,000	42	52	6		10
Pollster / "SE.pl"	31 Mar – 1 Apr 2025	1,007	43	57			14
United Surveys / WP.pl	21–23 Mar 2025	1,000	38.9	52.2	8.9		13.3
Opinia24	17–21 Mar 2025	1,000	37.6	52.4	10.0		14.8
IBRiS / "Wydarzenia" Polsat	13–16 Mar 2025	1,000	37.9	50.8	11.3		12.9
IPSOS / TVP Info	11–13 Mar 2025	1,000	39	52	8		13
Opinia24 / RMF FM	10–13 Mar 2025	1,000	36.2	52.1	11.7		15.9
United Surveys / WP.pl	7–9 Mar 2025	1,000	40.8	51.7	7.5		10.9
Research Partner / Wprost	21–24 Feb 2025	1,050	39	48		13.1	9
United Surveys / WP.pl	21–24 Feb 2025	1,000	41.9	52.8	5.3		10.9
Ipsos / Liberté!	19–21 Feb 2025	1,000	40	47	10		7
IPSOS / TVP Info	17–18 Feb 2025	651	40	49	10		9
Social Changes / wPolsce24	Feb 2025	–	36	50	10	4	14
Opinia24 / RMF FM	10–13 Feb 2025	1,000	37.3	50.6	12.1		13.3
United Surveys / WP.pl	7–9 Feb 2025	1,000	37.3	51.3	6.3	5.1	14.0
Opinia24 / ZET	23–29 Jan 2025	1,000	44	56			12
United Surveys / WP.pl	24–26 Jan 2025	1,000	39.9	49.6	10.5		9.7
Opinia24	20–24 Jan 2025	1,000	35.2	52.4	12.4		17.2
OGB	21–23 Jan 2025	1,000	50.6	49.4			1.2
IBRiS / "Wydarzenia" Polsat	16–19 Jan 2025	1,000	37.5	48.2	6.4	7.8	10.7
Pollster / "SE.pl"	17–18 Jan 2025	1,004	46	54			8
IPSOS / TVP Info	14–16 Jan 2025	1,000	29	42	16	9	13
United Surveys / WP.pl	10–12 Jan 2025	1,000	44.5	50.3	5.2		5.8
Opinia24 / RMF FM	7–9 Jan 2025	1,000	38.7	47.9	13.3		9.2
United Surveys / WP.pl	20–22 Dec 2024	1,000	35.9	56.2	6.5	1.4	20.3
IPSOS / TVP Info	17–18 Dec 2024	–	34	42	12	12	8
Opinia24 / RMF FM	Dec 2024	1,000	34.1	48.9	17.0		14.8
United Surveys / WP.pl	6–8 Dec 2024	1,000	41.2	50.3	6.1	2.4	9.1
Pollster / "SE.pl"	25–26 Nov 2024	1,015	42	58			16
Opinia24 / TVN24	Nov 2024	–	41	52	7		11
United Surveys / WP.pl	22–24 Nov 2024	1,000	33.7	55.9	6.8	3.6	22.2
IBRiS / "Rz"	22–23 Nov 2024	1,068	26.2	49.7	12.3	11.8	23.5
IBRiS / "Wydarzenia" Polsat	7–9 Nov 2024	1,000	36.4	49.99	13.8		13.61
United Surveys / WP.pl	25–27 Oct 2024	1,000	37.6	55.8	6.6		18.2

=== Hypothetical polling ===
Hypothetical polling

=== Mentzen v. Trzaskowski ===
Polling firm/Link	Fieldwork date	Sample size	Mentzen Confederation	Trzaskowski PO	Don't know	Abstain	Lead
Opinia24 / RMF FM	12–14 May 2025	1,003	42.9	51.7	5.4		8.8
IBRiS / Onet	12–13 May 2025	1,072	34.3	53.1	5.9	6.7	18.8
IBRiS / "RZ"	11–12 May 2025	1,073	33.3	53.5	13.2		20.2
IBRiS / Polskie Radio 24	10–11 May 2025	1,067	31.7	55.5	6.0	6.8	23.8
Pollster / "SE.pl"	28–29 Apr 2025	1,007	43	57			14
United Surveys / WP.pl	17–19 Apr 2025	1,000	42.8	52.6	4.6		9.8
IBRiS / Polsat News	16–17 Apr 2025	1,000	34.0	48.6	17.4		14.6
Pollster / “SE.pl”	15–16 Apr 2025	1,003	45	54			8
United Surveys / WP.pl	12 Apr 2025	1,000	33.7	56.5	9.8		22.8
CBOS	7–9 Apr 2025	1,000	47	51	3		4
Opinia24 / RMF FM	7–9 Apr 2025	1,000	33.2	43.2	9.4	14.2	10.0
United Surveys / WP.pl	4–6 Apr 2025	1,000	38.5	52.9	8.6		14.4
Opinia24 / ZET	2–6 Apr 2025	1,000	43	50	7		7
Pollster / "SE.pl"	31 Mar – 1 Apr 2025	1,007	45	55			10
United Surveys / WP.pl	21–23 Mar 2025	1,000	40.8	52.6	6.6		11.8
Opinia24	17–21 Mar 2025	1,000	42.1	50.6	7.3		8.5
IBRiS / "Wydarzenia" Polsat	13–16 Mar 2025	1,000	37.3	47.4	15.3		10.1
Research Partner / Wprost	21-24 Feb 2025	1,050	38.9	46.9		14.2	8.0
SW Research / Wprost	21–24 Feb 2025	1,000	40.1	46.9	7.0	6.0	6.8
Opinia24 / ZET	23–29 Jan 2025	1,000	46	54			8
Pollster / "SE.pl"	17–18 Jan 2025	1,004	43	57			14

=== Hołownia v. Mentzen ===
Polling firm/Link	Fieldwork date	Sample size	Hołownia PL2050	Mentzen Confederation	Don't know	Lead
Opinia24 / ZET	23–29 Jan 2025	1,000	54	46		8

=== Hołownia v. Nawrocki ===
Polling firm/Link	Fieldwork date	Sample size	Hołownia PL2050	Nawrocki PiS	Don't know	Lead
Opinia24 / ZET	23–29 Jan 2025	1,000	56	44		12
Pollster / "SE.pl"	17–18 Jan 2025	1,004	54	46		8
Pollster / "SE.pl"	25–26 Nov 2024	1,015	58	42		16

=== Hołownia v. Trzaskowski ===
Polling firm/Link	Fieldwork date	Sample size	Hołownia PL2050	Trzaskowski PO	Don't know	Lead
Pollster / "SE.pl"	28–29 Apr 2025	1,007	37	63		26
Pollster / “SE.pl”	15–16 Apr 2025	1,003	38	62		24
Opinia24 / ZET	23–29 Jan 2025	1,000	35	65		30
Pollster / "SE.pl"	17–18 Jan 2025	1,004	34	66		32
Pollster / "SE.pl"	25–26 Nov 2024	1,015	33	67		34
United Surveys / WP.pl	25–27 Oct 2024	1,000	29.5	51.6	18.9	22.1

=== Mentzen v. Nawrocki ===
Polling firm/Link	Fieldwork date	Sample size	Mentzen Confederation	Nawrocki PiS	Don't know	Lead
Opinia24 / ZET	23–29 Jan 2025	1,000	47	53		6
Pollster / "SE.pl"	17–18 Jan 2025	1,004	47	53		6

Hypothetical polling with different PiS candidate

==== Czarnek v. Trzaskowski ====
Polling firm/Link	Fieldwork date	Sample size	Czarnek PiS	Trzaskowski PO	Don't know	Lead
IBRiS / "Wydarzenia" Polsat	7–9 Nov 2024	1,000	35.2	50.9	15.9	15.7

==== Jaki v. Trzaskowski ====
Polling firm/Link	Fieldwork date	Sample size	Jaki PiS	Trzaskowski PO	Don't know	Lead
IPSOS / DoRzeczy.pl	1–3 Jul 2024	1,000	39	49	12	10

==== Morawiecki v. Trzaskowski ====
Polling firm/Link	Fieldwork date	Sample size	Morawiecki PiS	Trzaskowski PO	Don't know	Lead
IPSOS / DoRzeczy.pl	1–3 Jul 2024	1,000	38	48	14	10
Pollster	15 Jun 2024	–	38	62		24

==== PiS candidate v. Trzaskowski ====
Polling firm/Link	Fieldwork date	Sample size	PiS	Trzaskowski PO	Don't know	Lead
United Surveys / WP.pl	21 Nov 2024	1,000	39.2	58.5	2.3	19.3
IPSOS / PO	3 Jul 2024	–	36	53	8	17

Hypothetical polling with Radosław Sikorski as KO candidate

==== Nawrocki v. Sikorski ====
Polling firm/Link	Fieldwork date	Sample size	Nawrocki PiS	Sikorski PO	Don't know	Lead
IBRiS / "Wydarzenia" Polsat	7–9 Nov 2024	1,000	36.3	46.7	16.9	10.4
United Surveys / WP.pl	25–27 Oct 2024	1,000	38.3	54.1	7.6	15.8

==== Czarnek v. Sikorski ====
Polling firm/Link	Fieldwork date	Sample size	Czarnek PiS	Sikorski PO	Don't know	Lead
IBRiS / "Wydarzenia" Polsat	7–9 Nov 2024	1,000	35.3	46.5	18.3	11.2

==== PiS candidate v. Sikorski ====
Polling firm/Link	Fieldwork date	Sample size	PiS	Sikorski PO	Don't know	Lead
United Surveys / WP.pl	21 Nov 2024	1,000	42.4	54.9	2.7	12.5

== Campaign policy proposal polls ==
=== Proposed restriction on the 800+ programme for Ukrainian immigrants ===
Date(s) conducted	Polling firm/Link	Sample size	Approve	Disapprove	Don't know/Neutral	Net approval
24-25 Jan 2025	IBRiS / “Rzeczpospolita”	1,071	88	8.8	5.6	79.2

=== Proposal of sending Polish soldiers to Ukraine ===
Date(s) conducted	Polling firm/Link	Sample size	Approve	Disapprove	Don't know/Neutral	Net approval
7–9 Mar 2025	Pollster / "SE.pl"	1,015	26	62	12	-36

== See also ==
- 2025 Polish presidential election
