= Direct Democracy (Polish parliamentary group) =

Right-wing parliamentary group in Poland

Direct Democracy Demokracja Bezpośrednia
- Chairman: Jarosław Sachajko
- Founded: 16 October 2024
- Preceded by: Kukiz'15
- Ideology: Conservatism; Right-wing populism Polish nationalism Agrarianism
- Political position: Right-wing
- Member parties: Kukiz'15; Freedom and Prosperity; Free Republicans (party) (until 2025)
- Colors: Red
- Sejm: 3 / 460
- Senate: 0 / 100
- European Parliament: 0 / 53
- Regional assemblies: 0 / 552

Website
- marekjakubiak2025.pl

Direct Democracy (Polish: Demokracja Bezpośrednia, DB) is a right-wing parliamentary group in the Sejm of Poland, founded on 18 October 2024 by Kukiz’15 members. Before 2026, it was known as the Free Republicans.

== History ==
In the Kukiz'15 circle, which became the Free Republicans, sat Kukiz'15 deputies: Paweł Kukiz (leader), and also Marek Jakubiak and Jarosław Sachajko; since 24 July 2024 Jan Krzysztof Ardanowski, who left Law and Justice to found Freedom and Prosperity on 19 September 2024, was also a party member. The party name alludes to the United States Republican Party.

On 25 September 2024, a press conference was held in the Sejm, where Witold Gadowski and Wojciech Sumliński from There is One Poland, Marcin Dybowski from Freedom and Prosperity, and representatives from Rural Solidarity, "Samoobrona" agricultural trade union and the All-Polish Grassroots Farmers' Protest appeared alongside Kukiz'15 members.

On 16 October 2024 the Kukiz'15 circle transformed into the Free Republicans circle, and its leader became Marek Jakubiak. Twelve days later it announced it would contest the 2025 Polish presidential election with Marek Jakubiak as its candidate. In the election, Jakubiak sought to promote the group and appeal to conservative and Polish diaspora circles. There were minor conflicts inside the group in the presidential campaign, as Jakubiak had a friendly attitude towards the main Polish right-wing party Law and Justice, while Kukiz, the co-leader of the Free Republicans, distanced himself from both Law and Justice and Jakubiak's overtures to them. In the first round, Jakubiak finished 10th, winning 0.77% of the popular vote.

After the first round, all posełs of the circle endorsed Karol Nawrocki, an independent candidate supported by Law and Justice. Kukiz said that supporting Nawrocki is necessary to prevent the Tusk government from abusing the law to suppress its political opponents, and called on both right-wing and left-wing movements to support Nawrocki. Similarly, Jakubiak argued that it is necessary to support Nawrocki to prevent Poland from becoming a "banana republic" of the European Union.

=== Party name dispute ===
On 27 October 2025, the Federation for the Republic (whose sole poseł, Marek Jakubiak, was a member of the circle) adopted a resolution changing the Federation's name to the Free Republicans. Marek Jakubiak remained president of the transformed party, and Łukasz Dymko served as secretary. However, this caused a dispute in his circle, as its other members accused Jakubiak of trying to take control over the formation. The circle removed Jakubiak on 27 January 2026, renaming the party to Direct Democracy. Tomasz Rzymkowski joined the circle soon after.

== Ideology ==
Free Republicans are considered right-wing and conservative. Kukiz described Free Republicans as a party with a goal "to unite all those people who have a patriotic worldview and who either did not vote or, for various reasons, did not vote for PiS in the previous elections" and "to create a force that will remove cosmopolitans and bad people from power." On behalf of the group, Sachajko stated that Free Republicans prioritize Polish families, support motherhood, and oppose immigration. DB describes itself as conservative, patriotic, pro-independence, connected with the Christian tradition and concerned with Polish agriculture.

According to Jakubiak, Free Republicans have the same proposals and program that Kukiz'15 had been pursuing before. The group's programmatic demands listed by Jakubiak include the establishment of an Institution of Judicial Justice, introduction of general election for Attorney General, and the establishment of a mechanism that will allow for a recall of the Polish president. It also wants to introduce direct-vote referendums and to change the electoral law of Poland. Kukiz spoke of the ideologically diverse character of the group, as each of its MP has "a different approach to politics and different goals in the Sejm". Jakubiak represents the interests of the Polish diaspora and right-wing circles, while Jan Ardanowski represents those who "voted for the right wing but did not vote in these elections because they were disappointed with the agricultural policy pursued by PiS."

For the 2025 Polish presidential election, DB presented a program based on simplifying the tax system and cutting financial obligations on businesses, speeding up court proceedings and increasing the transparency of the courts, transferring more powers to local governments, strengthening the armed forces and modernising the Polish army, introducing tax breaks and subsidies for farmers, the creation of local cooperatives and economic initiatives in rural areas, as well as greater welfare support for families and pro-family policies that would increase natural population growth.

Free Republicans postulate a return to active conscription that would also apply to women, with 3–6 months of military training. It also supports selective nationalization of Polish industry, lump-sum tax on businesses and replacing the personal income tax with turnover tax. DB argues that a relationship between two people should have a utilitarian significance for the state, and thus supports marriage as a heterosexual family with children, and opposes civil partnerships. It is also in favor of a "bull tax" (Polish: bykowe), a tax on childless people. It also proposes an advanced agricultural program - it opposes the EU–Mercosur Association Agreement, calls for agricultural protectionism and subsidies, and proposes establishing a system through which state-owned companies would purchase and process Polish agricultural products in order to allow the state to control the prices. It argues that Poland should establish food sovereignty instead of relying on food imports. It criticizes the agricultural policy of Law and Justice for focusing on subsidies instead of state intervention.

== Deputies ==
- Jan Krzysztof Ardanowski
- Paweł Kukiz
- Jarosław Sachajko – chairman

All deputies were elected from the Law and Justice electoral lists.

== Electoral results ==
=== Presidential ===
Election year	Candidate	1st round		Candidate	2nd round	
Election year	Candidate	# of overall votes	% of overall vote	Candidate	# of overall votes	% of overall vote
2025	Marek Jakubiak	150,698	0.77 (#10)	Supported Karol Nawrocki	10,606,628	50.89 (#1)
