= Free Republicans (party) =

Free Republicans Polish: Wolni Republikanie
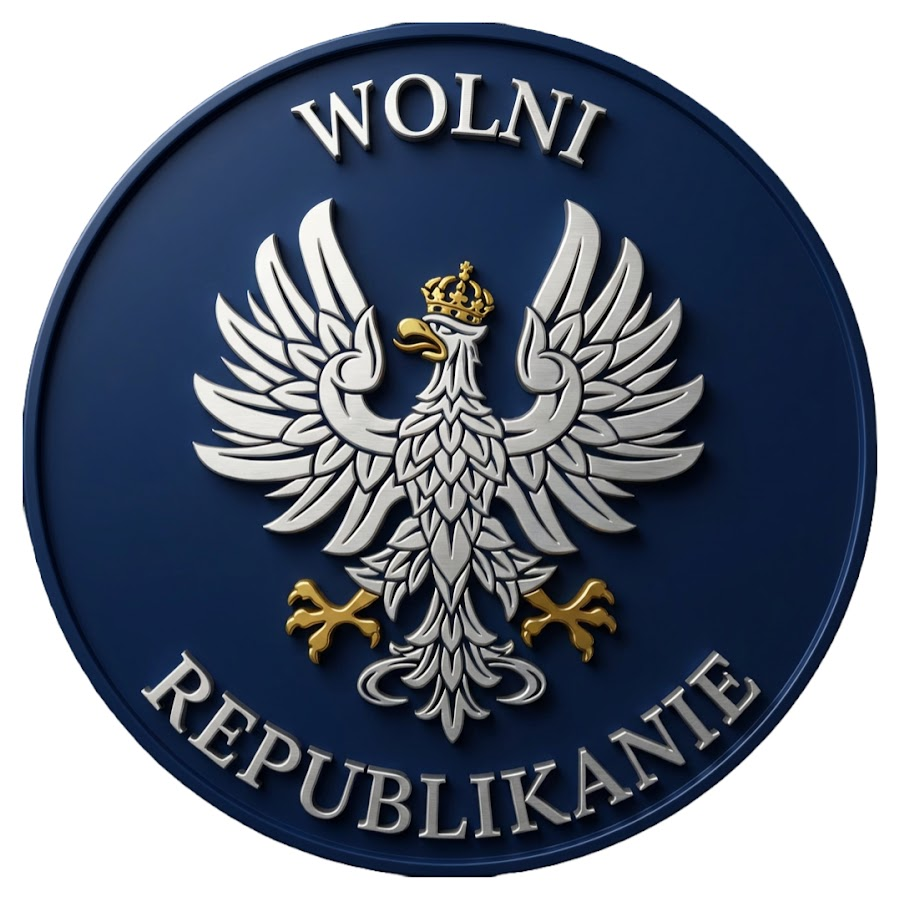
- Abbreviation: WR
- Chairman: Marek Jakubiak
- Founded: 15 November 2018
- Registered: 12 March 2020
- Headquarters: ul. Kolejowa 400, Dziekanów Nowy
- Ideology: Conservatism; Direct democracy; Euroscepticism
- Political position: Right-wing
- National affiliation: Development Plus (2026–present); Free Republicans (parliamentary group) (2024–2026); Confederation (2019)
- Sejm: 1 / 460
- Senate: 0 / 100
- European Parliament: 0 / 53
- Regional assemblies: 0 / 552
- City presidents: 0 / 107
- Voivodes: 0 / 16
- Voivodeship Marshals: 0 / 16

Website
- www.federacjadlarp.org

The Free Republicans (Polish: Wolni Repulikanie, WR), formerly Federation for the Republic (Polish: Federacja dla Rzeczypospolitej, FdR) is a Polish right-wing political party with a republican, conservative and national character. It was founded in November 2018, and registered on 12 March 2020 as the Federation for the Republic. On 27 October 2025, it was transformed, adopting the name of the Free Republicans parliamentary group operating since October 2024, although it excluded Jakubiak in January 2026, and the group renamed itself to Direct Democracy.

== History ==
On 2 November 2018 Marek Jakubiak, poseł for the 8th Sejm, declared he will exit the Kukiz’15 parliamentary group, and his desire to found a federative right-wing organization. 13 days later he announced the creation of the Federation for the Republic.

Despite initially trying to form a coalition with the Right Wing of the Republic, on 6 March, the party joined the Confederation, which was then created for the 2019 European Parliament election. 16 days later, Jakubiak cofounded the Confederation parliamentary circle.

The Federation of the Republic hosted Marek Jakubiak as its candidate for the 2020 presidential election, with Marek Jakubiak gaining 33,652 votes (0.17%). In the second round, it endorsed incumbent President Andrzej Duda.

In May 2023, Jakubiak returned to Kukiz'15 as its general secretary.

In the 2023 parliamentary election, Marek Jakubiak was elected to the Sejm as a member Kukiz'15 from the lists of Law and Justice.

In the 2025 presidential election, Marek Jakubiak again ran for President, improving his result, and earning 150,698 votes (0.77%). In the second round, he endorsed Karol Nawrocki.

On 27 October 2025, the party's national congress decided to adopt the name Free Republicans, identical to that of the Free Republicans parliamentary group, whose leadership was transferred from Jakubiak to Jarosław Sachajko. The renaming of the party caused other members of the Free Republicans parliamentary group to accuse Jakubiak of trying to control the entire formation. Jakubiak was removed from the group, which renamed itself to Direct Democracy, on 27 January.

== Ideology ==
Free Republicans refers to Roman Dmowski. In the party's statue, it refers to itself as republican. The primary postulates of the party are:

- introduction of a presidential system,
- introduction of single-seat constituencies in the Sejm,
- introduction of elements of direct democracy,
- introduction of "citizens' retirement",
- increase of income tax threshold,
- return of justice of the peace,
- shortening the duration of economic matters,
- liquidation of some offices,
- moving some ministerial offices outside of Warsaw,
- obligation of the removal of two laws to introduce one.

In 2019 the party published a detailed program, "Patriotism and freedom" (Polish: Patriotyzm i wolność).

== Election results ==
=== Presidential ===
Election	Candidate	1st round		2nd round	
Election	Candidate	# of overall votes	% of overall vote	# of overall votes	% of overall vote
2020	Marek Jakubiak	33,652	0.17%		
2025	Marek Jakubiak	150,698	0.77%		
