= Jan Krzysztof Ardanowski =

Polish politician (born 1961)

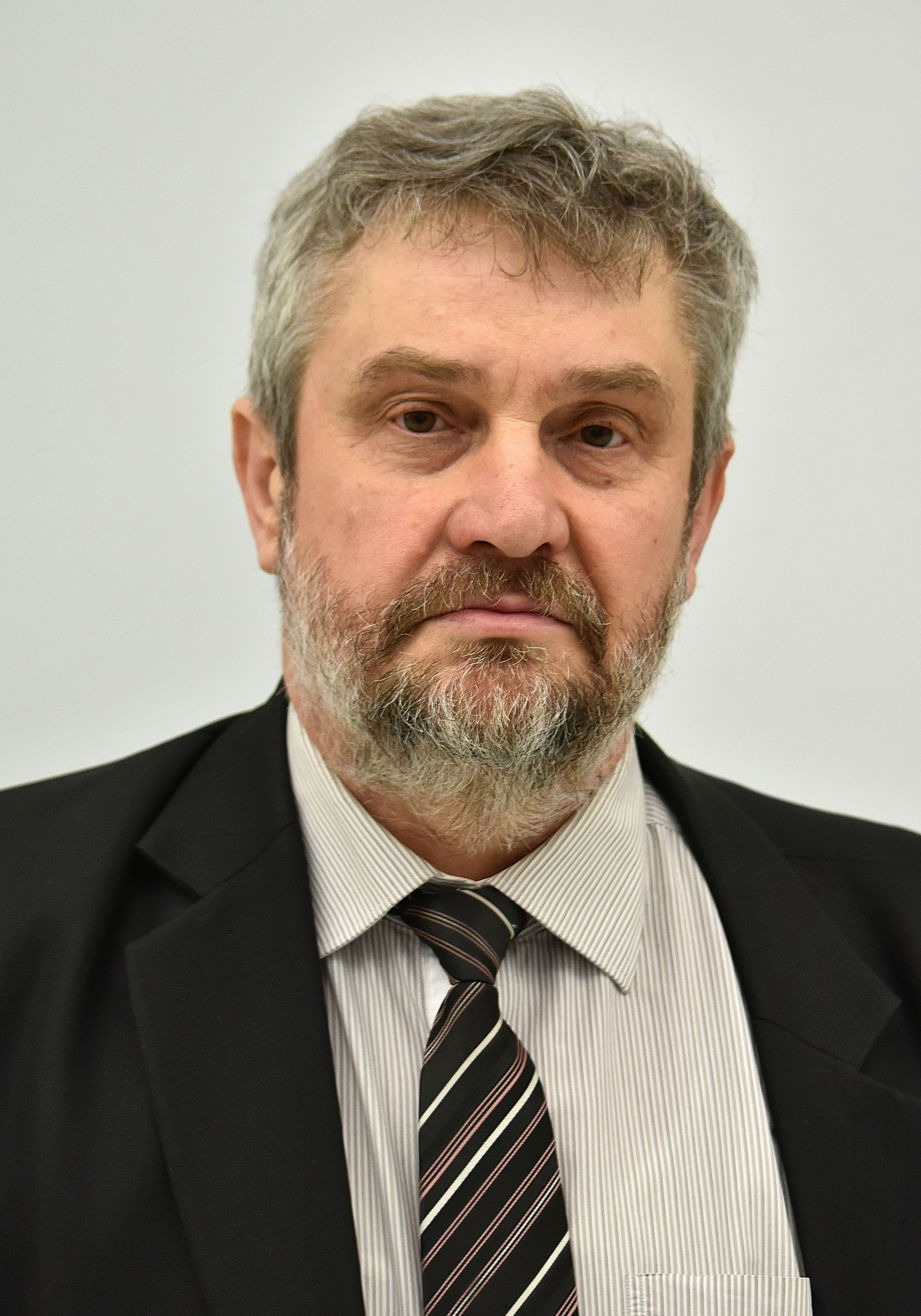

Member of the Sejm
- Incumbent
- Assumed office 8 November 2011
- Term(s): 7th, 8th, 9th and 10th Sejm
- Constituency: 5 (Toruń)

Minister for Agriculture and Rural Development
- In office 20 June 2018 – 6 October 2020
- President: Andrzej Duda
- Prime Minister: Mateusz Morawiecki

Personal details
- Born: 11 February 1961 (age 65) Czernikowo, Poland
- Party: Law and Justice (2001–2024); Kukiz'15 (2024); Freedom and Prosperity (2024–)
- Education: Bydgoszcz Academy of Technology and Agriculture (MEng)
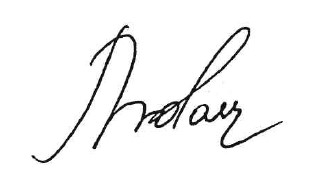
- Signature

Jan Krzysztof Ardanowski (born 11 February 1961) is a Polish politician, farmer and member of the Sejm since 2011. He served as the Minister for Agriculture and Rural Development between 20 June 2018 and 6 October 2020.

== Biography ==
In 1985 Ardanowski graduated from Bydgoszcz Academy of Technology and Agriculture with a Master of Engineering (magister inżynier) degree in Agriculture. During his studies he was a member of the Independent Students' Association and was actively involved in democratic opposition to the communist rule activities.

Ardanowski was elected in 2011 a member of the Sejm for the Sejm Constituency no. 5 as a Law and Justice candidate. He was reelected in 2015, 2019 and 2023 now serving his fourth term.

On 20 June 2018 he was appointed a Minister for Agriculture and Rural Development in the First Cabinet of Mateusz Morawiecki. He remained in office in the Second Cabinet of Morawiecki until 6 October 2020.

On 24 July 2024 he joined Kukiz'15's parliamentary circle, after having left the Law and Justice party a day earlier.

Ardanowski subsequently founded the Freedom and Prosperity party which was formally registered on 19 September 2024.

The party's stated aims are to become a big tent option for the right-wing, believing that the biggest right wing opposition party Law and Justice has lost its coalition-making abilities.
