= Paweł Kukiz =

Paweł Piotr Kukiz
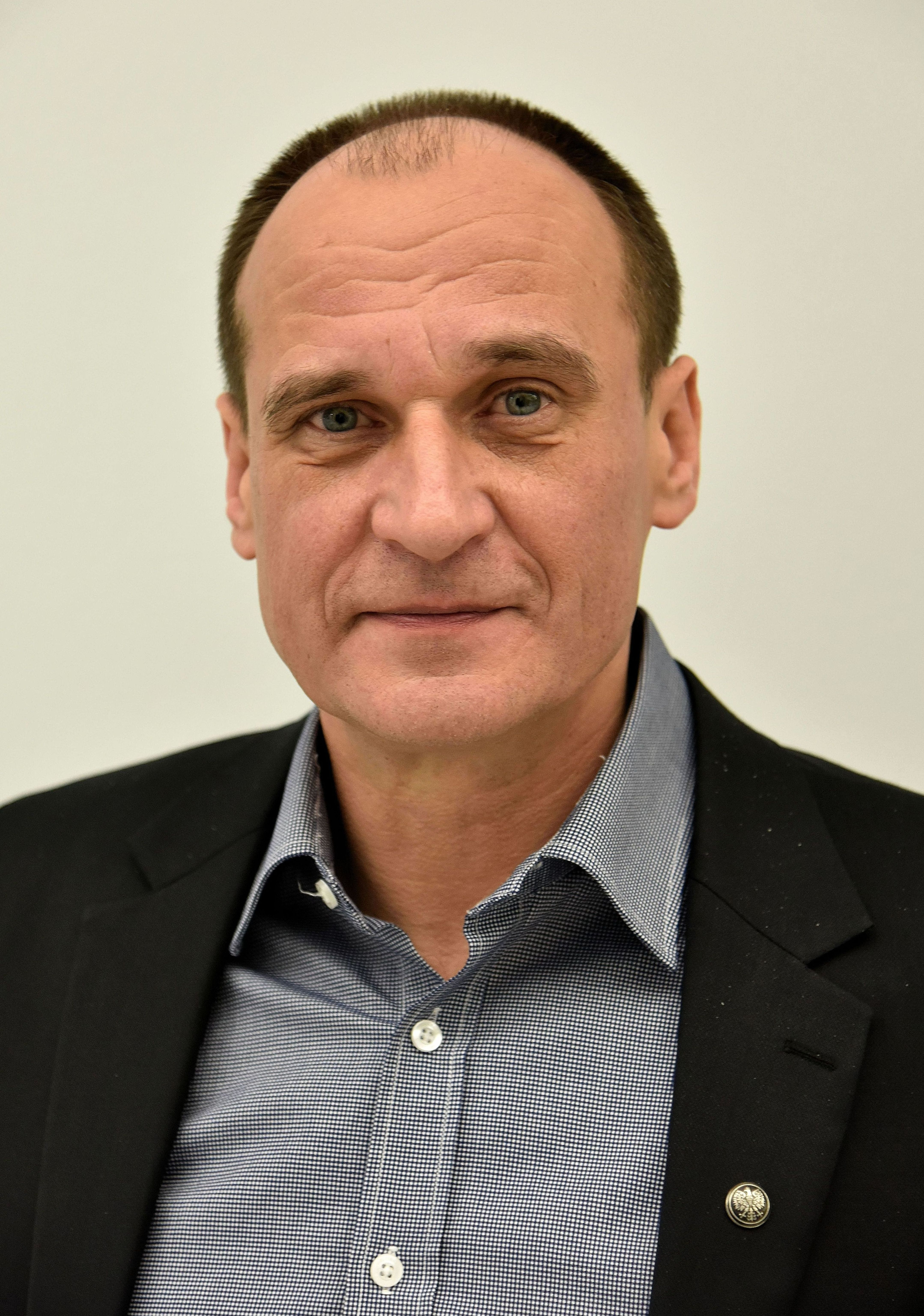
- Kukiz in 2016

Leader of Kukiz'15
- Incumbent
- Assumed office May 2015

Member of Sejm
- Incumbent
- Assumed office 12 November 2015
- Constituency: 19-Warsaw II (2015-2019); 21-Opole (2019-)

Member of Lower Silesian Regional Assembly
- In office 2014–2015

Personal details
- Born: 24 June 1963 (age 63) Paczków, Poland
- Party: Kukiz'15
- Other political affiliations: Polish Coalition; Nonpartisan Local Government Activists
- Spouse: Małgorzata Kukiz
- Children: 3 (daughters)
- Occupation: Politician, singer, actor
- Musical career
- Genres: Pop, rock, pop rock, punk rock, post-punk
- Labels: BMG Poland, QM Music, Sony Music Entertainment Poland

Paweł Piotr Kukiz (born 24 June 1963) is a Polish politician, singer and actor. He is the leader of Kukiz'15, a non-partisan political alliance campaigning for single-member districts, and was a candidate in the 2015 presidential election, in which he received 21% of the votes in the first round of the elections, finishing third. Kukiz has been a member of Polish parliament since 2015. He was a co-leader of the Polish Coalition, until Kukiz'15 left in late 2020.

== Biography ==
Kukiz is the grandson of Marian Kukiz, leader of the State Police of the Second Polish Republic, and the son of Marianne and Thaddeus (doctor and Kresy activist). Since 1991 he has been married to Małgorzata. They have three daughters together: Julia (born in 1991), Paula (born in 1994) and Hanna (born in 2000).

A musician by profession, he received a general secondary education. In Niemodlin, he attended primary school and graduated from general secondary school in 1981. A few years later, in 1984, in Niemodlin, Kukiz formed the band Piersi together with Rafal Eżyrski, Zbyszek Mozdzerski and Orin. He studied administration at the University of Wrocław, and then law and political science at the University of Warsaw, but did not graduate from either of these universities.

In the 1980s, he was the founder and vocalist of various rock bands such as CDN, Hak and Aya RL. From 1984 to 2013 he was the leader of Piersi, with which he released nine albums.

From 1989 to 1993, Kukiz performed as the vocalist of the group Emigranci. In 1995, Kukiz starred in the sensational film Girl's Guide by Juliusz Mahulski. In 1998, together with the Polish rapper and actor Bolek, Kukiz starred in the films Monday (1998) and Tuesday (2001) directed by Witold Adamek. In the second half of the 1990s Kukiz appeared in an advertisement for Pepsi.

In 2001 he participated in the music project Yugoton, and in 2007 in its continuation — Yugopolis. In 2003 the first and only album of the duo Borysewicz & Kukiz was released, where Kukiz sang accompanied by guitarist Jan Borysewicz with the participation of session musicians.

In the 2005 presidential election in Poland, Kukiz participated in the honorary committee in support of Donald Tusk's candidacy. In 2006-2007, he also supported Hanna Gronkiewicz-Waltz's local government campaign and Civic Platform parliamentary party. In 2009, Kukiz became the editor-in-chief of the Nieobecni portal.

In 2010, together with Maciej Maleńczuk, he recorded a CD with the repertoire of the "Kabaret Starszych Panów" — "Starsi panowie". In a duet with Polish rapper Pih, he sang the song "Młodość" on the album Bal matural (2014). The producers of the album were Robert Menchynsky and Jan Borysewicz.

== Political career ==
In the 2014 local election he was elected to the Lower Silesian Regional Assembly. He ran for president in the 2015 presidential elections, receiving 20,8% of the vote and third place. He created the political organization Kukiz'15 to contest the 2015 parliamentary election. He was elected to parliament, and Kukiz'15 received 8,81% of the vote and 42 seats. He and his political formation contested the 2019 parliamentary elections as a part of the Polish Coalition. The alliance ended in 2020. Kukiz was again reelected in the 2023 parliamentary election, this time running from the lists of Law and Justice. Since 2024, he has been co-founding the Free Republicans. Although Marek Jakubiak was their candidate in the 2025 Polish presidential election, Paweł Kukiz decided to vote for Sławomir Mentzen, the Confederation candidate. Before the second round of the 2025 presidential election, he endorsed Karol Nawrocki.

== Discography ==
=== Studio albums ===
Title	Album details	Peak chart positions	Sales	Certifications
Title	Album details	POL	Sales	Certifications
Borysewicz & Kukiz (with Jan Borysewicz)	Released: 24 February 2003; Label: BMG Poland; Formats: CD	1	POL: 35,000+	POL: Gold
Siła i honor	Released: 4 September 2012; Label: Sony Music Entertainment Poland; Formats: CD, digital download	3	POL: 15,000+	POL: Gold
Zakazane piosenki	Released: 4 November 2014; Label: Sony Music Entertainment Poland; Formats: CD, digital download	14		
"—" denotes a recording that did not chart or was not released in that territory.

=== Collaborative albums ===
Title	Album details	Peak chart positions	Sales	Certifications
Title	Album details	POL	Sales	Certifications
Starsi panowie (with Maciej Maleńczuk)	Released: 10 May 2010; Label: QM Music; Formats: CD	3	POL: 15,000+	POL: Gold
"—" denotes a recording that did not chart or was not released in that territory.

== Filmography ==
- ...jestem przeciw (1985) as a Boy
- Girl Guide (1995) as Józef Galica
- Billboard (1998) as Żyła
- Matki, żony i kochanki II (1998)
- Poniedziałek (1998) as Dawid
- Stacja PRL (1999-2000)
- Dzieci Jarocina (2000) as himself
- Wtorek (2001) as Dawid
- Czwarta władza (2004) as Actor Paweł Szeląg
- S@motność w Sieci (2006) as Priest Andrzej
