= Freedom and Prosperity (Poland) =

Freedom and Prosperity Wolność i Dobrobyt
- Leader: Jan Krzysztof Ardanowski
- Founder: Jan Krzysztof Ardanowski
- Founded: September 19, 2024
- Registered: September 19, 2024
- Split from: Law and Justice; Kukiz'15
- Headquarters: Warsaw
- Ideology: Conservatism
- Political position: Centre-right to right-wing
- Colours: Blue
- Sejm: 1 / 460
- Senate: 0 / 100
- European Parliament: 0 / 53
- Regional assemblies: 0 / 552

Website
- partia.info

Freedom and Prosperity (Polish: Wolność i Dobrobyt) is a Polish political party.

== History ==
On the 24 July 2024 the former Minister for Agriculture and Rural Development Jan Krzysztof Ardanowski joined Kukiz'15's parliamentary circle, after having left the Law and Justice party a day earlier. Ardanowski subsequently founded the Freedom and Prosperity party which was formally registered on 19 September 2024.

The party aims to become a big tent option for the centre-right, believing that the biggest right wing opposition party Law and Justice has lost its coalition-making abilities. Ardanowski compared his goals to that of U.S. President Ronald Reagan stating he was making a right-winged tent big enough for every right-winged movement.
