= Bydgoszcz University of Science and Technology =

State-run institution of higher education in Bydgoszcz, Poland

Coordinates: 53°07′25″N 17°59′20″E

- Politechnika Bydgoska im. Jana i Jędrzeja Śniadeckich
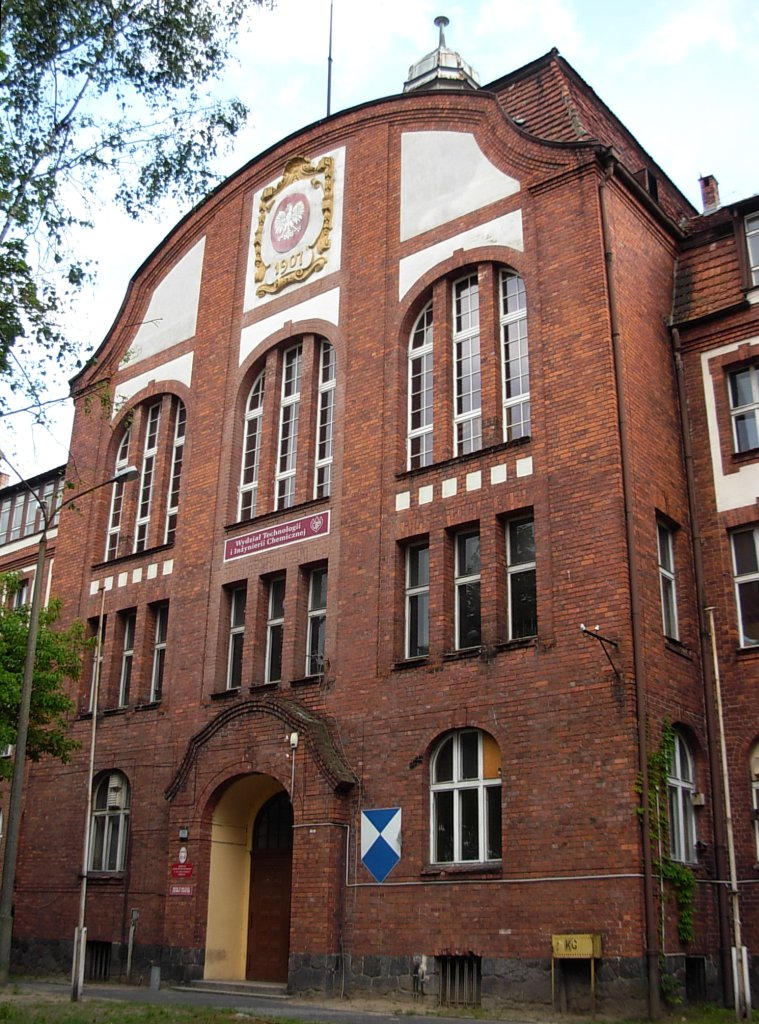
- Former names: Institute of Engineering
- Type: public
- Established: June 23, 1951 (WSI)
- Rector: Professor Marek Adamski
- Administrative staff: 1,300
- Students: 5,366 (12.2023)
- Location: Bydgoszcz, Kuyavian-Pomeranian Voivodeship, Poland
- Website: www.utp.edu.pl/en
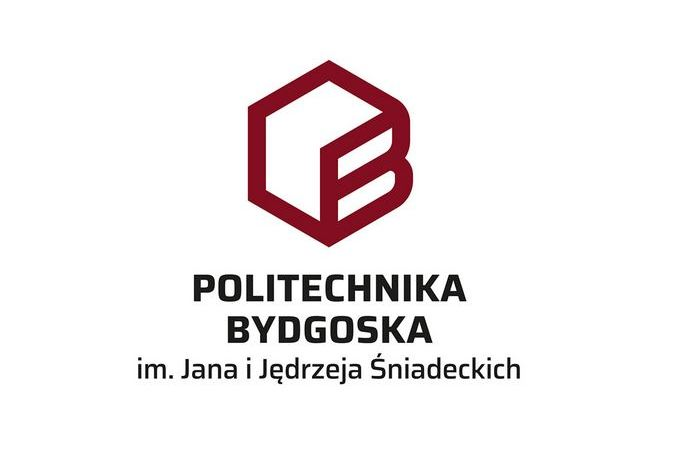

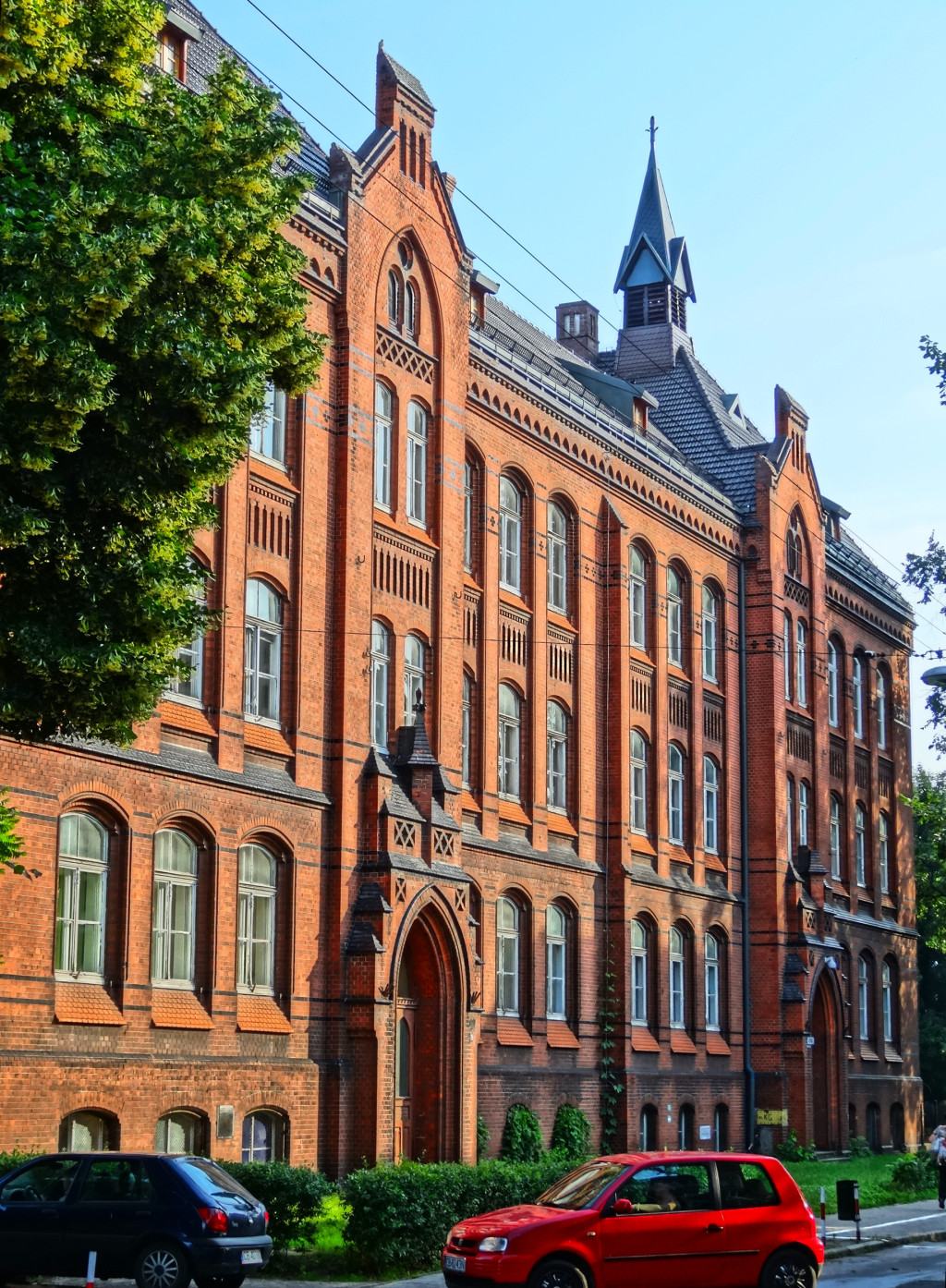
University Rectorate

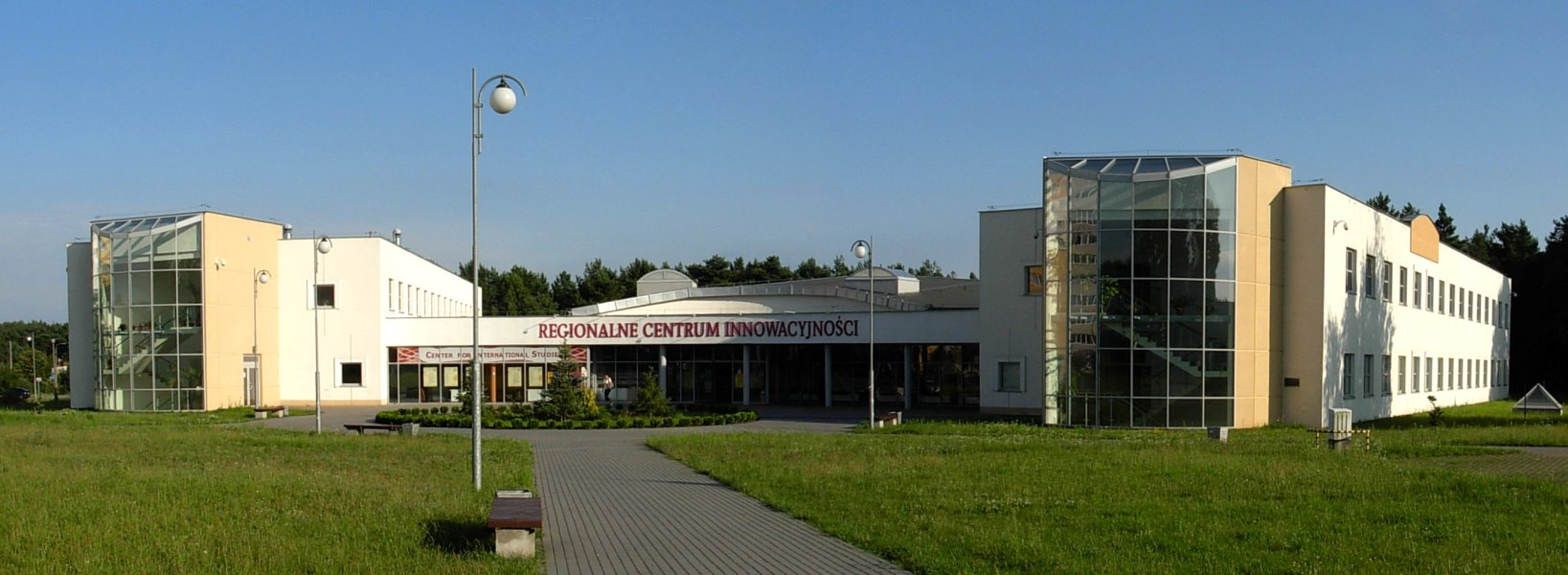
UTP Centre for Innovation

Bydgoszcz University of Science and Technology (Polish: Politechnika Bydgoska im. Jana i Jędrzeja Śniadeckich) is a state-run institution of higher education in Bydgoszcz, Poland. According to international ranking by the Webometrics Ranking of World Universities published by the Spanish institute Consejo Superior de Investigaciones Científicas, the University is ranked 23rd among the technical universities in Poland and, internationally, ranks 1,769 among all listed universities.

The University of Science and Technology in Bydgoszcz was established in 1951 originally as the vocational institute of engineering, and converted into a full-fledged university gradually, between 1964 and 2006. It is offering technical, agricultural, art and management study programmes, with Bachelor in Engineering, MSc, and Doctorate degrees.

== History ==
Bydgoszcz University of Science and Technology originated from Evening School of Engineering in Bydgoszcz, the Bydgoszcz Branch of the Association of Polish Mechanical Engineers and Technicians. Under a resolution of the Presidium of the Government of 23 June 1951, the Evening School of Engineering was established.

== Faculties and institutes ==
- Construction and Environmental Engineering (Budownictwa i Inżynierii Środowiska)
1. Architecture and Urban Design (Architektura i urbanistyka)
2. Interior Design (Architektura wnętrz)
3. Construction (Budownictwo)
4. Environmental Engineering (Inżynieria środowiska)
- Faculty of Animal Breeding and Biology (Hodowli i Biologii Zwierząt)
1. Animal Physiotherapy (Zoofizjoterapia)
2. Veterinary inspection (Inspekcja weterynaryjna)
3. Environmental Protection (Ochrona środowiska)
4. Animal Husbandry (Zootechnika)
- Mechanical Engineering (Inżynierii Mechanicznej)
1. Biomedical Engineering (Inżynieria biomedyczna)
2. Mechanical Engineering and Design (Mechanika i budowa maszyn)
3. Agricultural and Forest Technologies (Technika rolnicza i leśna)
4. Transportation (Transport)
5. Industrial Design (Wzornictwo)
- Agriculture and Biotechnology (Rolnictwa i Biotechnologii)
1. Landscape Design (Architektura krajobrazu)
2. Biotechnology (Biotechnologia)
3. Agriculture (Rolnictwo)
4. Food & Dietary Technologies (Technologia żywności i żywienie człowieka)
- Chemical Technology & Engineering (Technologii i Inżynierii Chemicznej)
1. Materials Engineering (Inżynieria materiałowa)
2. Chemical Technologies (Technologia chemiczna)
3. Food Technology (Technologia żywności i żywienie człowieka)
- Telecommunications, Computer Science and Electrical Engineering (Telekomunikacji, Informatyki i Elektrotechniki)
1. Electronics and telecommunication (Elektronika i telekomunikacja)
2. Electrical Engineering (Elektrotechnika)
3. Telecommunication (Teleinformatyka)
4. Applied Computer Science (Informatyka stosowana)
5. Energy Engineering (Energetyka)
- Management (Zarządzania)
1. Management (Zarządzanie)
2. Management & Engineering of Production (Zarządzanie i inżynieria produkcji)
- Institute of Mathematics & Physics (Instytut Matematyki i Fizyki)
1. Physics Technologies (Fizyka techniczna)
