= Wojciech Sumliński =

Polish publicist

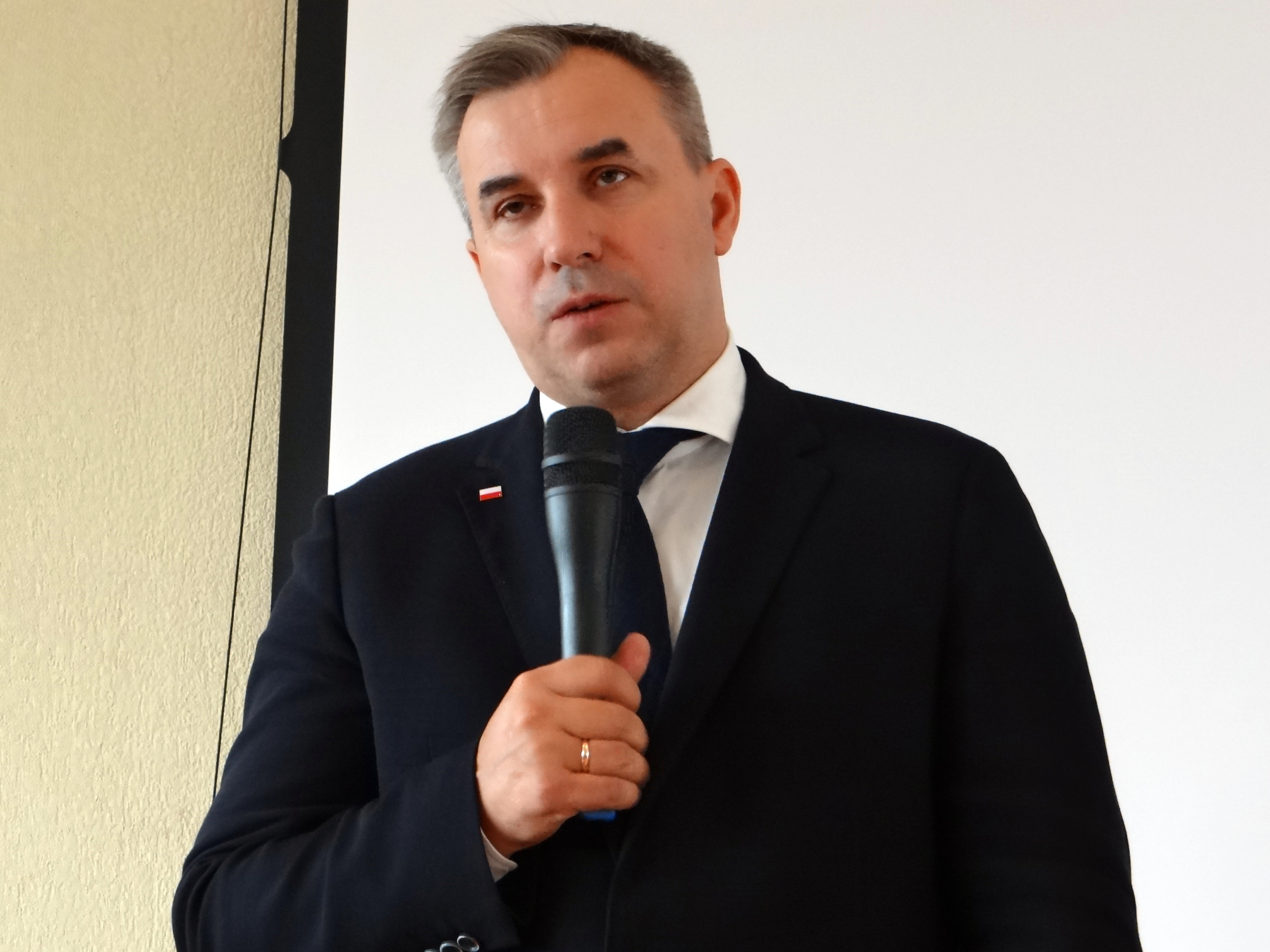
- Born: April 15, 1969 (age 57); Warsaw, Poland
- Occupations: psychologist, investigative journalist, publicist, film director

Wojciech Sumliński (born 15 April 1969 in Warsaw) is a Polish psychologist, investigative journalist, publicist and film director. He worked for the Polish magazines, including: the daily newspaper Życie and the weekly magazines Gazeta Polska and Wprost. Sumliński made also documentaries for Telewizja Polska (public Polish Television). In his career he has written about the death circumstances of priest Jerzy Popiełuszko, history of the Polish communist secret service, Polish politics and the country's justice system. Recently, he comments on politics of memory.

== Early career ==
Wojciech Sumliński was born and raised in Warsaw. He graduated from the Psychology Department of the Cardinal Stefan Wyszynski University in Warsaw. In 1996, he moved to Biała Podlaska where he began to work as an investigative journalist in the local press. He was the Editor in Chief of “Słowo Podlasia”. In 1997, he received the Ministry of Interior and Administration award for the cycle of reportages on border organized crime written under the pseudonym “Stefan Kukulski.” Two years later, he was nominated to the “Press” award in investigative journalism category for his publications on Henryk Goryszewski who, while presiding over the Sejm Commission of Public Finances, advised private companies on tax evasion. He ran a TVP program Oblicza prawdy about Security Services and TV documentaries on i.e. Military Information Services (Wojskowe Służby Informacyjne) in which he spoke about the cooperation of the journalist Milan Subotić with the Military Information Services in 2007.

== Controversies ==
In 2005, Sumliński published an article in the weekly magazine Wprost in which he accused the driver of the murdered priest – Waldemar Chrostowski – of being an agent of the communist Security Bureau and taking part in kidnapping and murdering the priest. Chrostowski, who was kidnapped together with Popiełuszko but managed to escape the vehicle, sued Sumliński for libel. The court decided to the advantage of the plaintiff as Sumliński failed to perform due diligence in collecting, analysing, and presenting arguments and evidence. Sumliński and the Wprost magazine, where he published the original accusations, were ordered to publish apologies to Chrostowski.

Media Diversity Institute, a London-based non-governmental organization, in its report titled “Antisemitism and anti-vax discourse in Europe” (2021) names Sumliński as anti-vax activist who uses antisemitic narrative.

In 2021, many people questioned Sumlinski's video “Lifeguards's confession” accusing him of manipulating the information on COVID-19. YouTube removed the recording. The film was evaluated as unreliable.

On December 31, 2022, Sumliński posted a statement Facebook in which he apologized to the journalist and publicist Jacek Łęski for the fact that in his book entitled "Officer. Czego ludzie żałują przed śmiercią", he provided untrue and unverified information regarding Łęski's alleged cooperation with the Office of State Protection (Urząd Ochrony Państwa). The apology was the result of a lost court case by Wojciech Sumliński.

=== Internal Military Service case ===
Sumliński together with a former agent of the communist Internal Military Service were accused by a local prosecutor of offering a bribe of 200 thousand PLN to a member of the Internal Military Service verification board for a clearance of another agent. Sumliński never admitted the allegations. On the day on which the decision to arrest Sumliński was taken, the journalist delivered a personal letter to the press. A day later, he attempted to commit suicide in a Warsaw church. Expert psychiatrists concluded Sumliński could not remain in jail. A group of Polish journalists wrote an open letter in which they called for verifying why secret services were involved in the arrest of the journalist. In December 2015, Warsaw District Court relieved Sumliński of all allegations concluding that the agents conducted their own “game” to acquire information on the Military Secret Service and Sumlinski was innocent. In September 2016, the appeal court kept the decision of the district court. Despite the appeal by a prosecutor, this decision was revoked by the National Public Prosecutor's Office (Prokuratura Krajowa). The case was removed from the Supreme Court of Poland.

=== Plagiarism case ===
In January 2016, Jakub Korus from the weekly magazine Newsweek Polska claimed Sumliński copied at least thirty entire fragments from Alistair MacLean's and Raymond Chandler's books into his own book Niebezpieczne związki Bronisława Komorowskiego published in 2015. In his next article Korus pointed out to the sentences that were said to be plagiarised from the novels of John Steinbeck, Mitch Albom and Paulo Coelho. After the publication of the first article, Sumliński concluded that the accusation refers to less than a full page of writing, and that it aimed to discredit him as an author instead of questioning his book publication at large. During the meetings with the public, he often said that he referred to the works of MacLean and Chandler on purpose and he never tried to hide it. Sumliński was also said to plagiarize a part of reportage on Ukrainian women working in Poland by copying from the weekly magazine Polityka.

=== Return to Jedwabne ===
Sumliński made and distributed the documentary film Return to Jedwabne that has been viewed and described as antisemitic. He claimed that Poles were not responsible for the Jedwabne pogrom and the film has been advertised under the slogan “Jewish partition of Poland.” In October 2021, YouTube removed the film due to hate speech and violating its Community Standards. In September 2021, the Wisła Cinema in Warsaw canceled the film premiere. The screening of the film was boycotted by many Polish artists.

According to Tomasz Urzykowski from Gazeta Wyborcza, Wojciech Sumliński is "a journalist with extreme right-wing views, tracking down" Jewish conspiracies "against Poland and undermining Poles' responsibility for the crime in Jedwabne".

Sumliński published three parts of the book titled: Return to Jedwabne. In the second part, he states: "Documents and other materials piled up like mountains, and their overall analysis showed one thing - that those who accused our ancestors of crimes and other atrocities used a mechanism called “catch a thief.” As rule, it is not Poles, but Jews, who collaborated with the invaders and behaved viciously. In a way, this attitude was a return to the past when Jews joined our enemies and were always the fifth column, because Poland was never a home for them, but only a resting place - Polin". In the first part of his book on Jedwabne, he expressed his anti-Jewish views in the following manner: "What ist the Holocaust Industry? It is an organized group of institutions, foundations organizations and individuals, in this case representing American Jews, who receive gigantic benefits due to the Holocaust".

Jakub Maciejewski from the right-wing "WPolityce.pl" online news platform writes about Sumliński's work: "Something else bothers Editor Sumliński. The author who once aspired to discover the truth about President Komorowski, Prime Minister Tusk, who wrote about priest Jerzy Popiełuszko as of his personal teacher, is now degrading himself with more and more sucked-out topics. The Jews are colonizing him in Poland, the Jews are stopping him from exhuming in Jedwabne, the Jews have made him a pandemic, and now - the Russian invasion of Ukraine".

== Publications ==
- Teresa, Trawa, Robot. Największa operacja komunistycznych służb specjalnych, Warszawa: Fronda PL 2009. ISBN 978-83-60335-73-4.
- Z mocy bezprawia. Thriller, który napisało życie, Warszawa: Fronda PL 2011. ISBN 978-83-62268-28-3.
- Z mocy nadziei. Thriller, który pisze życie..., Wydawca: Wojciech Sumliński Reporter, 2014. ISBN 978-83-938942-0-8.
- Lobotomia 3.0, Wojciech Sumliński Reporter, 2014. ISBN 978-83-938942-3-9.
- Niebezpieczne związki Bronisława Komorowskiego, Biała Podlaska 2015. ISBN 978-83-938942-9-1.
- Czego nie powie Masa o polskiej mafii, Warszawa 2015. ISBN 978-83-938942-5-3.
- Pogorzelisko, Warszawa 2016. ISBN 978-83-942934-5-1.
- Oficer, Warszawa 2016. ISBN 978-83-942934-7-5.
- Niebezpieczne związki Andrzeja Leppera, Warszawa 2016. ISBN 978-83-942934-6-8.
- ABW, Warszawa 2017. ISBN 978-83-942934-8-2.
- Ksiądz, Warszawa 2017 ISBN 978-83-945829-1-3.
- Niebezpieczne związki Sławomira Petelickiego, Warszawa 2017 ISBN 978-83-945829-2-0.
- To tylko mafia, 2018. ISBN 978-83-945829-8-2.
- Niebezpieczne związki Donalda Tuska, 2018. ISBN 9788394582999.
- Powrót do Jedwabnego, 2019. ISBN 9788395181580.
- Powrót do Jedwabnego 2, 2020. ISBN 978-83-955458-2-5.
- Powrót do Jedwabnego 3 (Return to Jedwabne 3), 2021. ISBN 978-83-955458-5-6.
