= Piotr Szumlewicz =

Polish journalist (born 1976)

Piotr Szumlewicz (born March 19, 1976, in Warsaw) is a Polish journalist and publicist, trade union activist.

== Career ==
Szumlewicz graduated in sociology and philosophy from the University of Warsaw. He edited the quarterly "Without Dogma" and the website lewica.pl.

In December 2024, he expressed his willingness to run in the 2025 Polish presidential election.
