= Dorota Gawryluk =

Polish journalist (born 1972)

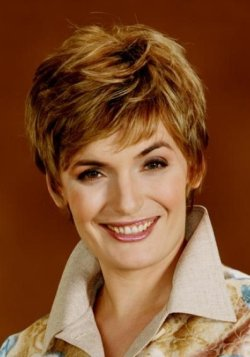
- Gawryluk in 2008
- Born: Dorota Zelek; 4 March 1972 (age 54); Limanowa, Lesser Poland, Poland
- Education: University of Warsaw
- Occupation: Journalist
- Employer: Telewizja Polsat (1994—present)
- Board member of: Director of the information and journalism division (2018–2023); director of the thematic channels division (2023–present)
- Spouse: Jerzy Gawryluk
- Children: Nikon, Maria

Dorota Gawryluk [dɔˈrɔ.ta ɡavˈrɨ.luk], née Zelek [ˈzɛ.lɛk] (born 4 March 1972) is a Polish journalist, television and radio presenter, and actress.

== Biography ==
Zelek was born in Limanowa and grew up in Kamionka Mała, Limanowa County, where she attended primary school. In 1987, she moved to Warsaw, where she graduated from the XXVI Liceum Ogólnokształcące im. H. Jankowskiego "Kuby" (now im. J. Tuwima). She then went on to the University of Warsaw and received a degree in journalism.

In 1994, Gawryluk started working for the television company Telewizja Polsat; first as a reporter, then as a presenter, and in 2001 became the deputy head of the Informacje news program (now the Wydarzenia section) and the political morning talk show "Political Graffiti" (Polityczne graffiti). Later, she was head of journalism and content supervisor of the Interwencja news program (The Intervention).

From 6 December 2004 to 27 February 2007, she hosted the news program Wiadomości on TVP1. She was also the host of the current affairs program Forum. After the president of President of TVP, Bronisław Wildstein, was fired and political reporters Dominika Długosz and Jacek Karnowski left Wiadomości, Zelek took a month's leave from TVP and, on 27 April 2007, announced that she would not return to TVP.

Shortly afterwards, she accepted a job offer from Polsat owner Zygmunt Solorz and had started working for TV Biznes (now called Polsat News 2), where she hosted the publicist program Sam na sam (In Private). From June 2008 to March 2009, she hosted her own original program Dorota Gawryluk — Konfrontacje (Dorota Gawryluk — Confrontations) on Polsat. She has been the host of Polsat's Wydarzenia (Events) since February 2009, and was head of the program from March 2016 to December 2016. At Polsat News she hosted Gość Wydarzeń (Guest of Events) and Prezydenci i premierzy (Presidents and Prime Ministers). Additionally from March 2017 to December 2017 she hosted her original program #DorotaGawrylukZaprasza (#DorotaGawrylukInvites). In March 2018 she became director of the information and journalism division of Telewizja Polsat. She was dismissed from this position in December 2023. She then took up the position of director of the thematic channels division. Since March 2024, she has been leading the original program Lepsza Polska (A Better Poland).

She has written features for the weekly magazine Uważam Rze and the dailies Rzeczpospolita and Fakt. She worked at Radio TOK FM, where she hosted the morning slot, and at Polskie Radio Program I, where she interviewed politicians in the Saturday programme Sygnały dnia (Signals of the Day).

== Private life ==
Gawryluk has been married to Jerzy Gawryluk since 1993. The couple have two children, son Nikon [ˈɲi.kɔn] (born 1993) and daughter Maria [ˈma.rja] (born 2 February 2011). Gawryluk has an interest in fashion.

== Awards and nominations ==
- Four nominations for Telekamery
- Nomination for the television diamond of Gazeta Wyborcza
- Nomination for Grand Press for election graffiti
- Journalistic discovery 1999 of the monthly magazine Press.pl
- Ostre Pióro BCC award for the promotion of economic knowledge

== Filmography ==
- 2000 — The Lousy World as a television presenter (episode 26)
- 2000–2001 — Adam i Ewa (Adam and Eve) as a host of Informacje (Informations) on television Polsat
- 2001 — Zostać Miss (To Become a Miss) as a Polsat journalist
- 2003 — Zostać Miss 2 (To Become a Miss 2) as a Polsat journalist
- 2010 — Ludzie Chudego (The People of Chudy) as a host of Wydarzenia (Events) on television Polsat (episode 10)
- 2018 — W rytmie serca. (To the Heartbeat) as a host of Wydarzenia (Events) on television Polsat
- 2023 — Sługa narodu (Servant of the People) as host of Puls Dnia (The Pulse of the Day) on Polsat News television
