= Katarzyna Cichos =

Polish politician (born 1986)

Katarzyna Jadwiga Cichos

Personal details
- Born: 28 April 1986 (age 40) Poland
- Party: Poland 2050
- Education: University of Silesia in Katowice

Katarzyna Cichos (born 28 April 1986) is a Polish politician.

== Biography ==
Katarzyna Cichos was born on 28 April 1986 and graduated from the University of Silesia in Katowice, attaining a doctoral degree in law in June 2016.

Cichos worked in several non-governmental organizations and is employed at the Cardinal Stefan Wyszyński University.

Cichos run in the 2014 local elections, simultaneously contesting the seat of mayor of Siemianowice Śląskie, for which she won 2,142 votes (9.67%) and didn't enter the runoff, and a seat to the city council of Siemianowice Śląskie, which she won with 387 votes (6.42%), both with the backing of the Silesian Autonomy Movement, despite not being a member of the party. Following the election, Cichos' disagreement with and disassociation from the Movement led to it cutting ties and even unsuccessfully demanding Cichos' resignation from her seat. She left the city council in 2017, a year prior to the 2018 local elections.

In 2016, Cichos was nominated by the Ministry of Foreign Affairs to become the vice-consul in the General Consulate of the Republic of Poland in Manchester. However, after accusations of being a separatist due to her former ties with the Silesian Autonomy Movement, her nomination was withdrawn.

In 2025, Cichos declared her candidacy for the 2025 Polish presidential election, along the founding of the "center-right, meritocratic, pro-development" Platform for the Development of Poland. However, she withdrew to endorse Marek Woch of Bezpartyjni Samorządowcy. She is the author of the book "Moja droga, Moja Polska" ("My way, my Poland").

On 31 March 2026, she was elected as the chair of Poland 2050, a party unaffiliated with Szymon Hołownia's Poland 2050.

== Electoral history ==
Electoral history of Katarzyna Cichos
Year	Office	Party	Votes			Result	Ref.
Year	Office	Party	Total	%	P.	Result	Ref.
2014	Mayor of Siemianowice Śląskie	Siemianowice Residents' Initiative and Silesian Autonomists	2,124	9.67%	5th	Lost	
2014	Siemianowice Śląskie City Council	Siemianowice Residents' Initiative and Silesian Autonomists	387	6.42%	10th	Won	
2025	President of Poland	Platform for the Development of Poland	withdrawn			—N/a	
