= Marek Jakubiak =

Polish politician and brewer (born 1959)

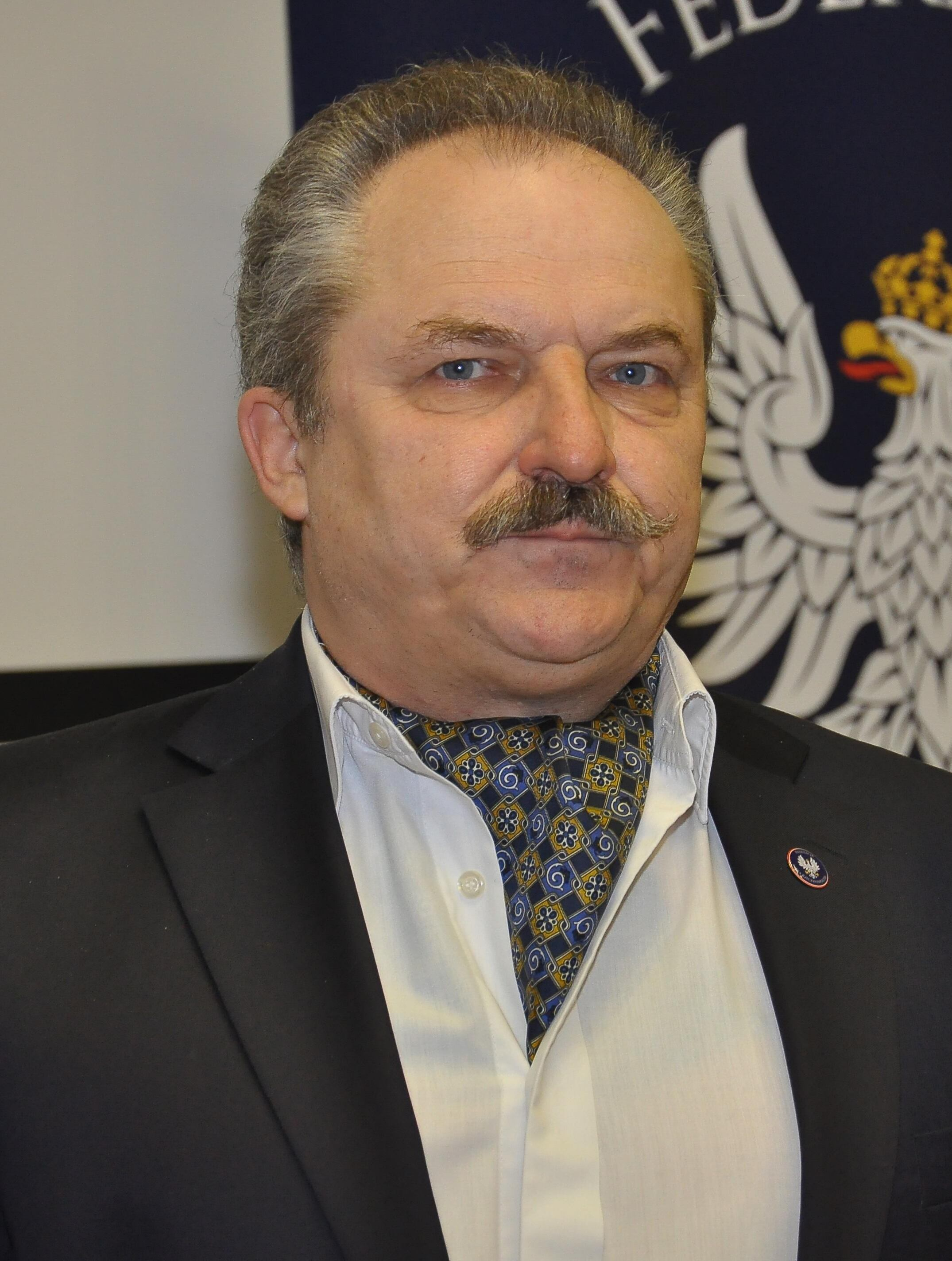
- Jakubiak In 2019

President of WR
- Incumbent
- Assumed office 18 October 2024

Secretary-General of Kukiz'15
- Incumbent
- Assumed office May 2023

Member of the Sejm
- Incumbent
- Assumed office 13 November 2023
- Constituency: 19 – Warsaw I
- In office 7 November 2015 – 12 November 2019
- Constituency: 16 – Płock

Personal details
- Born: 30 April 1959 (age 67) Warsaw, Poland
- Party: WR (2024-2026)
- Other political affiliations: Kukiz'15 (2015-2026); FdR (2018-present)
- Domestic partner: Irmina Ochenkowska
- Children: Aneta Jakubiak; Mieszko Jakubiak; Maciej Jakubiak

Marek Jakubiak (born 30 April 1959) is a Polish politician and brewer, who has served as President of WR, a right wing party, since 2024. He has also served as Secretary-General of Kukiz'15, a right-wing populist political party since 2023. He served as a Sejm (the lower house of the Polish parliament) member from 2015 to 2019, and from 2023.

In 2015, Jakubiak was elected to the Sejm, starting from the Kukiz'15 list in the Płock constituency. He was not re-elected in 2019.

In 2020 and 2025, Jakubiak unsuccessfully ran for president. He received 33,652 votes (0.17%) in the 2020 election and 150,698 votes (0.77%) in 2025. Following each first round, he endorsed the Law and Justice-backed candidates, Andrzej Duda and Karol Nawrocki, respectively.

Before becoming a politician, Jakubiak worked for Ciechan Brewery.

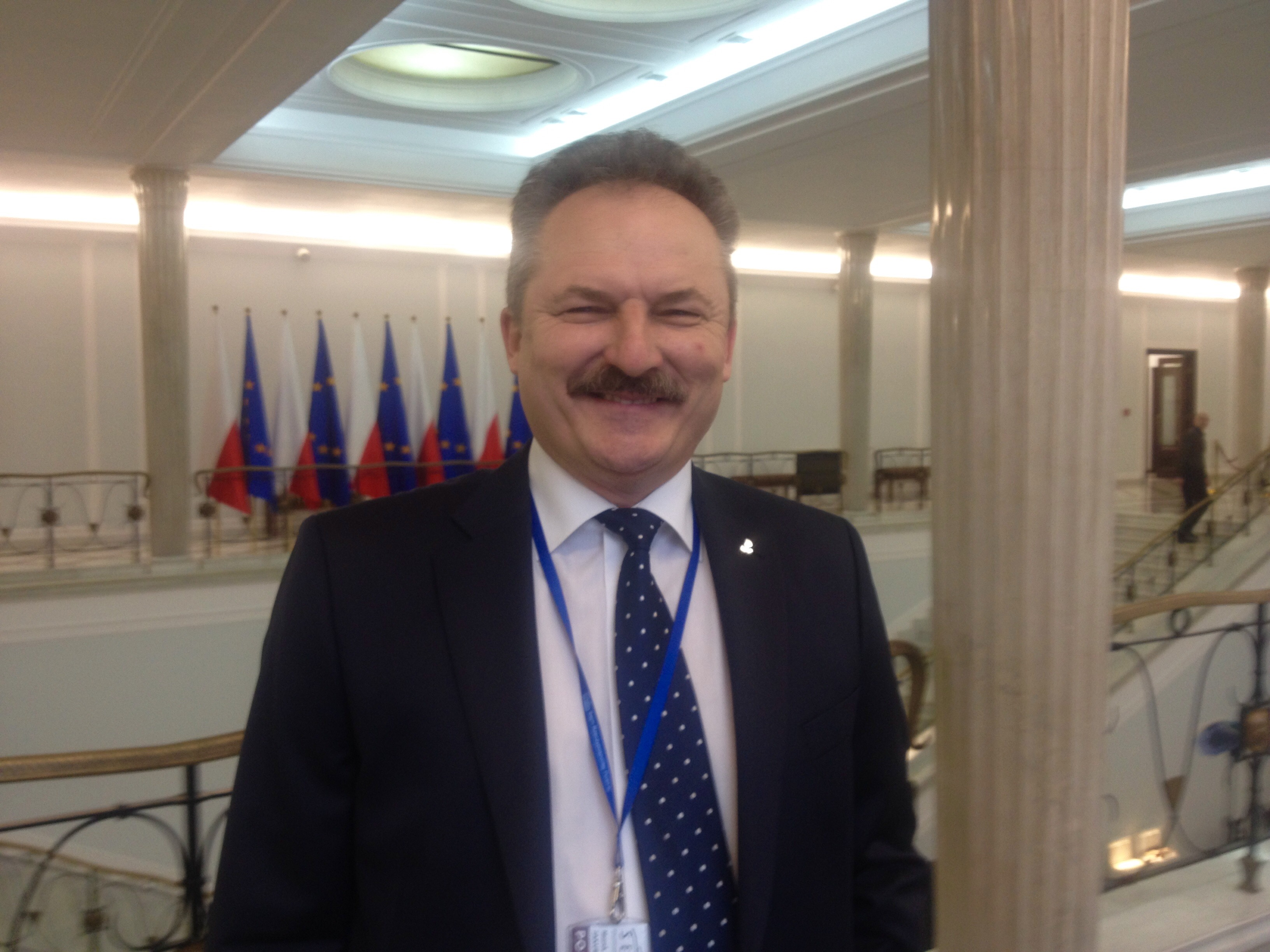
Jakubiak in 2015
