= Jarosław Sachajko =

Polish politician (born 1971)

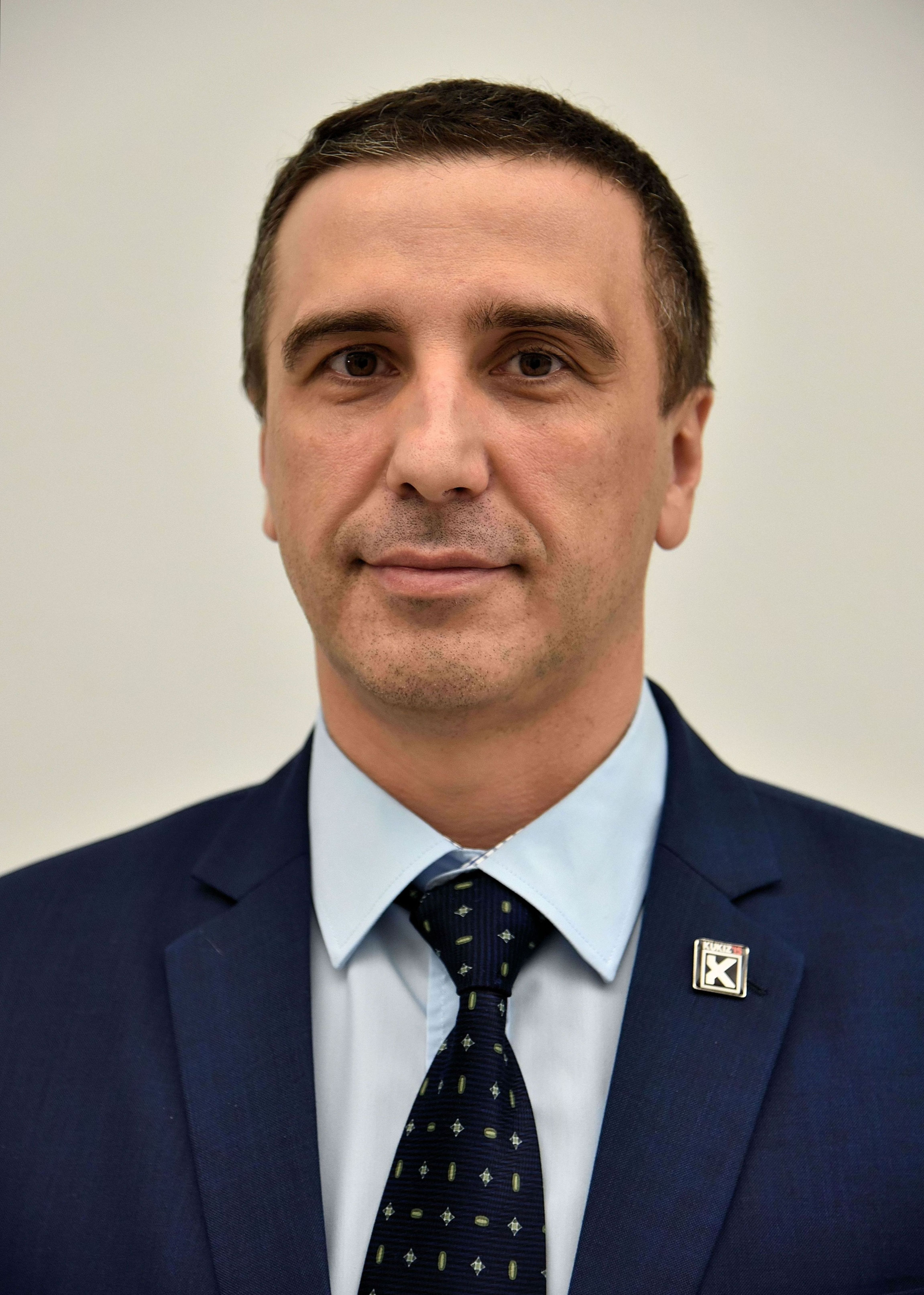
- Sachajko in 2016

Member of the Sejm
- Incumbent
- Assumed office 12 November 2015
- Constituency: Chełm

Personal details
- Born: 8 October 1971 (age 54)
- Party: Kukiz'15

Jarosław Sachajko (born 8 October 1971) is a Polish politician serving as a member of the Sejm since 2015. He has served as president of Kukiz'15 since 2023.
