= Kukiz'15 =

Political party in Poland

- Abbreviation: K'15
- Leader: Paweł Kukiz
- Founded: May 2015
- Headquarters: ul. Słowackiego 17; 49-330 Łosiów
- Youth wing: Kukiz'15 Youth Club
- Ideology: Right-wing populism; Direct democracy
- Political position: Right-wing
- National affiliation: Direct Democracy (since 2024); United Right (2021–2023); Polish Coalition (2019–2020)
- European affiliation: EAFD (2020–2023); 5SDD (2019)
- Colours: Black
- Sejm: 2 / 460
- Senate: 0 / 100
- European Parliament: 0 / 53
- Regional assemblies: 0 / 552

Website
- kukiz15.org

Kukiz'15 is a right-wing populist political party in Poland led by Paweł Kukiz.

It was formed in 2015 as a loose movement that registered itself as an association in 2016 and later as a political party in 2020. Initially, it was connected with far-right parties such as the National Movement, although it has moderated its political outlook since 2016. During the 2018 local elections, it coordinated with the socially conservative Right Wing of the Republic; in 2019, it joined the Polish Coalition. Due to its eurosceptic stances, its membership was terminated from the coalition. In May 2021 it announced its support for the ruling United Right coalition.

== Political positions ==
Kukiz'15 was initially connected with the National Movement party, although Kukiz'15 itself was not characterized as far right but rather national-conservative, conservative-liberal, and anti-establishment. After 2016, they ceased operations with far-right organizations and politicians. Since its inception, it has lacked programmatic coherence and thus has been described as a big tent party. In its program, they have expressed support for direct democracy. Its leader and the party has expressed eurosceptic stances, and has been described as a right-wing populist, and conservative party, that sits on the centre-right and right wing on the political spectrum.

The key postulates upon foundation of the party were:

- Eliminating the monopoly of political parties in parliament ("destroying particracy")
- Electoral reform, eliminating proportional representation in favour of first past the post or mixed electoral system.
- Separation of government, courts and parliament.
- Protection of civic liberties.
- Introduction of obligatory referendums.

== History ==
The movement was founded after Kukiz stood in the 2015 presidential election, winning 21% of the vote and coming in third during the election's first round. Kukiz's primary issue during the election was the replacement of Poland's proportional representation electoral system with single member constituencies, which was the subject of a referendum in September 2015.

The movement was particularly popular among young people: Kukiz won 42% among voters aged 18 to 29 in the 2015 presidential election.

In the 2015 parliamentary election, Kukiz'15 cooperated with the far-right National Movement, which gained 5 of Kukiz' 42 parliamentary seats.

In April 2016, the National Movement leadership decided to end its collaboration with Kukiz'15 and instructed its MPs to leave the Kukiz'15 parliamentary club, but only one MP followed party instructions. These ones, who stayed in Kukiz'15, together with a few other Kukiz' MPs, formed National Democracy (Endecja).

There was a Sejm scandal in April 2016. Kornel Morawiecki of Kukiz'15 left his Sejm member card in the voting device when he felt sick and went out from the debating hall and then Małgorzata Zwiercan voted for him. After this he left Kukiz'15 and launched a new party Free and Solidary (Wolni i Solidarni) along with two other Kukiz'15 MPs.

In February 2017, three Kukiz'15 MPs left the group and became a parliamentary representation of the association "Republicans" (Republikanie).

In February 2018, Paweł Kukiz apologised for having introduced the nationalists into the Sejm.

In May 2018, Kukiz'15 has coordinated with the social conservative Right Wing of the Republic in local elections.

In August 2019, Kukiz'15 joined the Polish People's Party (PSL) to set up a joint list for the 2019 parliamentary election named Polish Coalition. This alliance helped both parties overcome the 5%-threshold and Kukiz kept 6 MPs in the Sejm. Because of that alliance, the Real Politics Union ended cooperation with Kukiz'15.

However, the ideological differences between the Pro-European PSL and the Eurosceptic Kukiz MPs led to a quick fallout. In November 2020, a PiS motion was put to a vote on the support for the Polish government in the EU budget negotiations (in which Poland and Hungary used their veto). 5 of the 6 Kukiz MPs voted in support. This led the PSL and Kukiz'15 to part ways.

On 20 June 2021, the reactivation of the congress of the Republicans, which were instrumental in the creation of Kukiz'15 in 2015, took place. Karol Rabenda announced that some Agreement members will join the Republican association and restructure it into a party, and that the newly formed party will subsequently join the governing coalition as a full member. In response, the Law and Justice chairman Jarosław Kaczyński made a speech praising the new reformed party.

After Jarosław Gowin's scepticism with the "Polish Deal" proposal (an economic recovery plan for countering the COVID-19 recession in Poland) and media law changes that would inevitably force the American company Discovery, Inc. to sell its TVN Group, Gowin was publicly removed from his position as deputy prime minister, resulting in realignment of the composition of the coalition. As result, Adam Bielan's "Agreement rebels" new party joined the coalition as replacements, and the remaining Kukiz '15 MP's led by Paweł Kukiz declared their support for the coalition, except Stanisław Tyszka.

== Deputies ==
All deputies were elected on United Right list

- Paweł Kukiz - leader of the party.
- Jarosław Sachajko
- Marek Jakubiak

== Election results ==
=== Presidential ===
Election	Candidate	1st round		2nd round	
Election	Candidate	# of overall votes	% of overall vote	# of overall votes	% of overall vote
2020	Supported Władysław Kosiniak-Kamysz	459,365	2.36 (#5)		
2025	Supported Marek Jakubiak	150,698	0.77 (#10)		

=== Sejm ===
Election	Leader	# of vote	% of vote	Seats	+/–	Government
2015	Paweł Kukiz	1,339,094	8.81 (#3)	42 / 460	New	Opposition
2019	Paweł Kukiz	1,578,523	8.55 (#4)	6 / 460	▼36	Opposition (2019–2021)
2019	Paweł Kukiz	1,578,523	8.55 (#4)	6 / 460	▼36	Support (2021–2022)
2019	Paweł Kukiz	1,578,523	8.55 (#4)	6 / 460	▼36	Opposition (2022–2023)
2019	Paweł Kukiz	As part of Polish Coalition, which won 30 seats in total.				
2023	Paweł Kukiz	7,640,854	35.39 (#1)	3 / 460	▼3	Opposition
2023	Paweł Kukiz	As part of the United Right coalition, which won 194 seats in total.				

=== European Parliament ===
Election	# of vote	% of vote	Seats	+/–	EP Group
2019	503,564	3.69 (#5)	0 / 52	New	-

=== Regional assemblies ===
Election	# of vote	% of vote	Seats	+/–
2018	868,332	5.63 (#5)	0 / 552	New
