= Elections in Poland =

Poland has a multi-party political system. On the national level, Poland elects the head of state – the president – and a legislature. There are also various local elections, referendums and elections to the European Parliament.

Poland has a long history of public elections dating back several centuries, beginning with the elections to Sejm in Łęczyca (known as the First Sejm) in 1182. Notably, since the Sejm of 1493, Polish kings were obliged to call regular Sejms and regional elections (sejmiks) every two years. From 1573 until 1795 the state system of elective monarchy in Poland required the royal elections of monarchs as well during the Sejm proceedings.

The first modern and free elections in 20th-century Poland were held in 1919, two months after the country regained independence in 1918 after over a century of partition and occupation by foreign powers. After the Second World War, Poland fell into the Soviet sphere of influence as a satellite state and became controlled by the communists, who rigged the elections of 1947 to ensure they controlled the entire Polish government. There were regular elections in Poland from that time on; however, no elections until the groundbreaking elections of 1989, marking the fall of communism, were free. The Polish communists secured a majority of the lower house seats in 1989, but allowed opposition parties to take up seats.

== Result in history ==
The results of the June 1989 parliamentary elections:

Party or alliance		Constituency (competitive)			Constituency (reserved)			National list			Total seats	+/–
Party or alliance		Votes	%	Seats	Votes	%	Seats	Votes	%	Seats	Total seats	+/–
Patriotic Movement for National Rebirth	Polish United Workers' Party				22,734,348	59.26	156	132,845,385	47.19	17	173	−72
Patriotic Movement for National Rebirth	United People's Party				8,865,102	23.11	67	74,921,230	26.62	9	76	−30
Patriotic Movement for National Rebirth	Democratic Party				3,961,124	10.32	24	24,814,903	8.82	3	27	−8
Patriotic Movement for National Rebirth	PAX Association				1,216,681	3.17	7	24,269,761	8.62	3	10	+10
Patriotic Movement for National Rebirth	Christian-Social Union				907,901	2.37	6	16,601,896	5.90	2	8	+8
Patriotic Movement for National Rebirth	Polish Catholic-Social Association				681,199	1.78	4	8,029,911	2.85	1	5	+5
Patriotic Movement for National Rebirth	Independents	4,937,750	21.42	0							0	−74
Solidarity Citizens' Committee		16,433,809	71.28	161							161	+161
Minor opposition		171,866	0.75	0							0	0
Confederation of Independent Poland		122,132	0.53	0							0	0
Total		21,665,557	100.00	161	38,366,355	100.00	264	281,483,086	100.00	35	460	0

== History ==
The first Polish Sejm was called in 1182. Since the Sejm of 1493, called by king John I Olbracht in 1493, Sejms were to be held every 2 years. There were also special Sejms when needed, for example the coronation sejms.

The most famous Sejms included the Sejm Niemy or the Silent Sejm of 1717 which marked the beginning of Russian control over Polish internal affairs; the subsequent Repnin Sejm or the Sejm of 1767/1768, whose terms were dictated by the Russian ambassador Repnin; the Great Sejm – or the Four-Years Sejm of 1798–1792, which voted for the May Constitution of Poland; and the Grodno Sejm – last Sejm of the First Republic.

Since the death of Sigismund II Augustus, last of the Jagiellonian dynasty, and following a brief period of interregnum, the entire nobility (szlachta) of the Commonwealth (10% of the population) could take part in the elections of the monarchs. Last elected king was Stanisław August Poniatowski in 1764. He abdicated in 1795 after the partitions of Poland ended the existence of sovereign state of Poland for 123 years.

It is disputed how free were elections held after 1926; in particular, the 1930 elections are often considered to have been non-free pl:Wybory brzeskie. Polish presidents were elected by the Sejm and Senate (Zgromadzenie Narodowe), not in a popular vote. Before 1922, the Polish Chief of State was called Naczelnik Państwa.

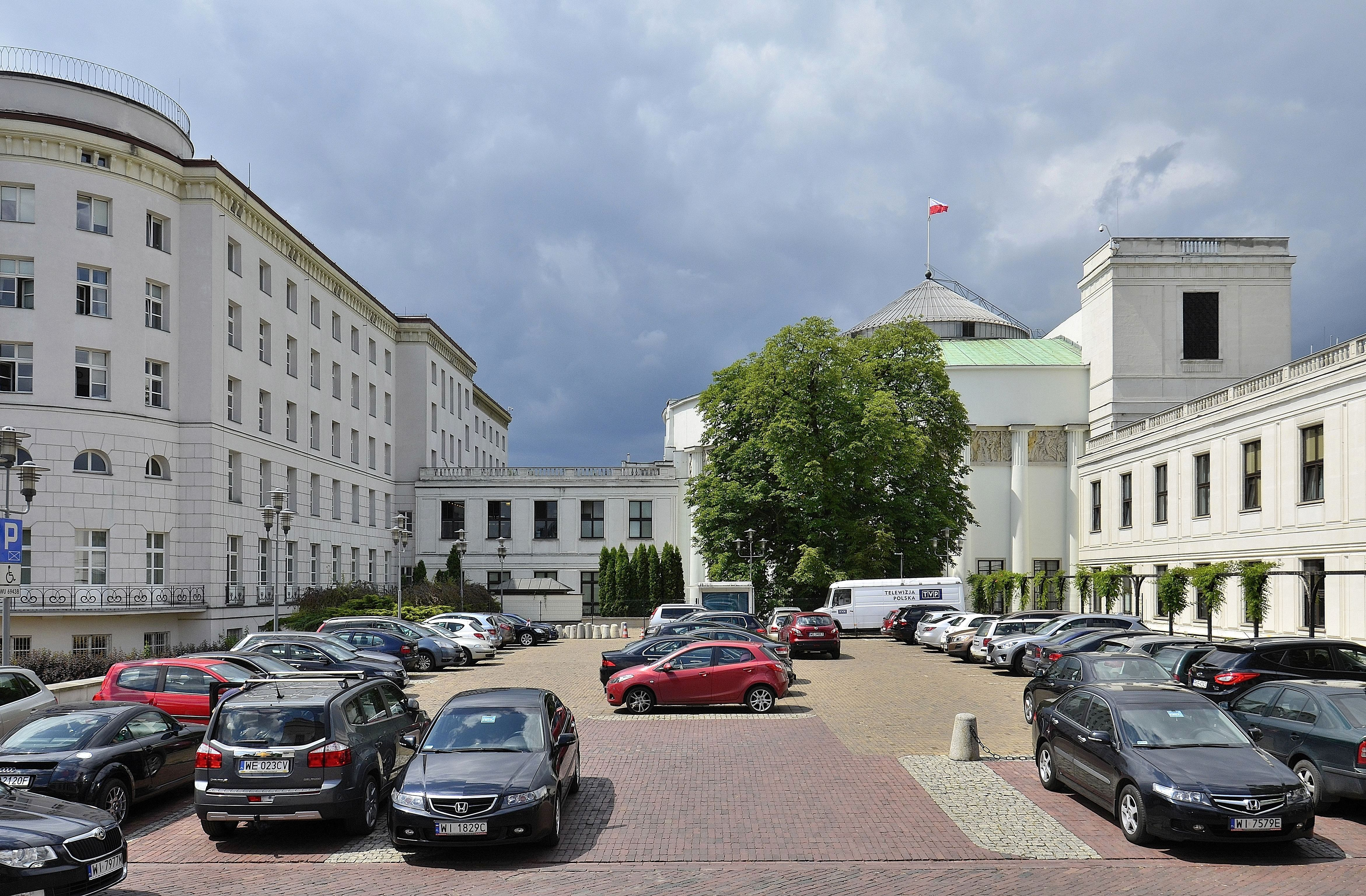
Sejm and Senate Complex of Poland

Only the 1947 and 1989 elections can be considered as partially free. All others were controlled during that period. There were no direct presidential elections until 1990, with President Bolesław Bierut's nomination in 1947 by the Sejm and the abolition of the office by the 1952 constitution.

=== Polish elections 1573 to 1985 ===
==== Polish election, Royal elections ====
- 1st 1573 Polish–Lithuanian royal election
- 2nd 1576 Polish–Lithuanian royal election
- 3rd 1587 Polish–Lithuanian royal election
- 4th 1632 Polish–Lithuanian royal election
- 5th 1648 Polish–Lithuanian royal election
- 6th 1669 Polish–Lithuanian royal election
- 7th 1674 Polish–Lithuanian royal election
- 8th 1697 Polish–Lithuanian royal election
- 9th 1704 Polish–Lithuanian royal election
- 10th 1733 Polish–Lithuanian royal election
- 11th 1764 Polish–Lithuanian royal election

==== Presidential elections ====
- 1st Polish election, 1922 (9 Dec)
- 2nd Polish election, 1922 (20 Dec)
- 3rd Polish election, 1926 (May)
- 4th Polish election, 1926 (Jun)
- 5th Polish election, 1933
- 6th Polish election, 1947

==== Legislative elections ====
- 1st Polish election, 1919
- 2nd Polish election, 1922
- 3rd Polish election, 1928
- 4th Polish election, 1930
- 5th Polish election, 1935
- 6th Polish election, 1938
- 7th Polish election, 1947
- 8th Polish election, 1952
- 9th Polish election, 1957
- 10th Polish election, 1961
- 11th Polish election, 1965
- 12th Polish election, 1969
- 13th Polish election, 1972
- 14th Polish election, 1976
- 15th Polish election, 1980
- 16th Polish election, 1985

== Post-Communist Poland ==
Opinion polling for parties between 1992 and 2025

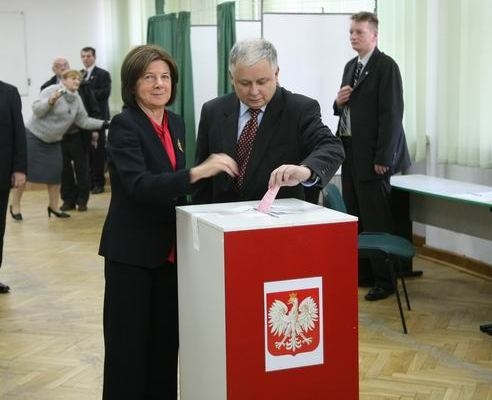
Lech Kaczyński and Maria Kaczyńska in 2006

Since 1991, Polish elections operate according to a typical representative democracy.

Poland has a multi-party political system, with numerous parties in which no party often has any chance of gaining power by itself, and parties must work with each other to form coalition governments.

Poland elects on national level a head of state – the president – and a legislature. The president is elected for a five-year term by the people. The National Assembly has two chambers. The parliament (Sejm) has 460 members, elected for a four-year term by party lists in multi-seat constituencies with a 5% threshold for single parties and 8% threshold for coalitions, (requirement waived for national minorities). The Senate (Senat) has 100 members elected for a four-year term via the first past-the-post system, with 100 single member constituencies. Prior to the 2011 parliamentary elections, elections to the Senate were conducted through plurality bloc voting in 40 multi-seat constituencies. Since 1991, elections have been supervised by National Electoral Commission (Państwowa Komisja Wyborcza), whose administrative division is called the National Electoral Office (Krajowe Biuro Wyborcze

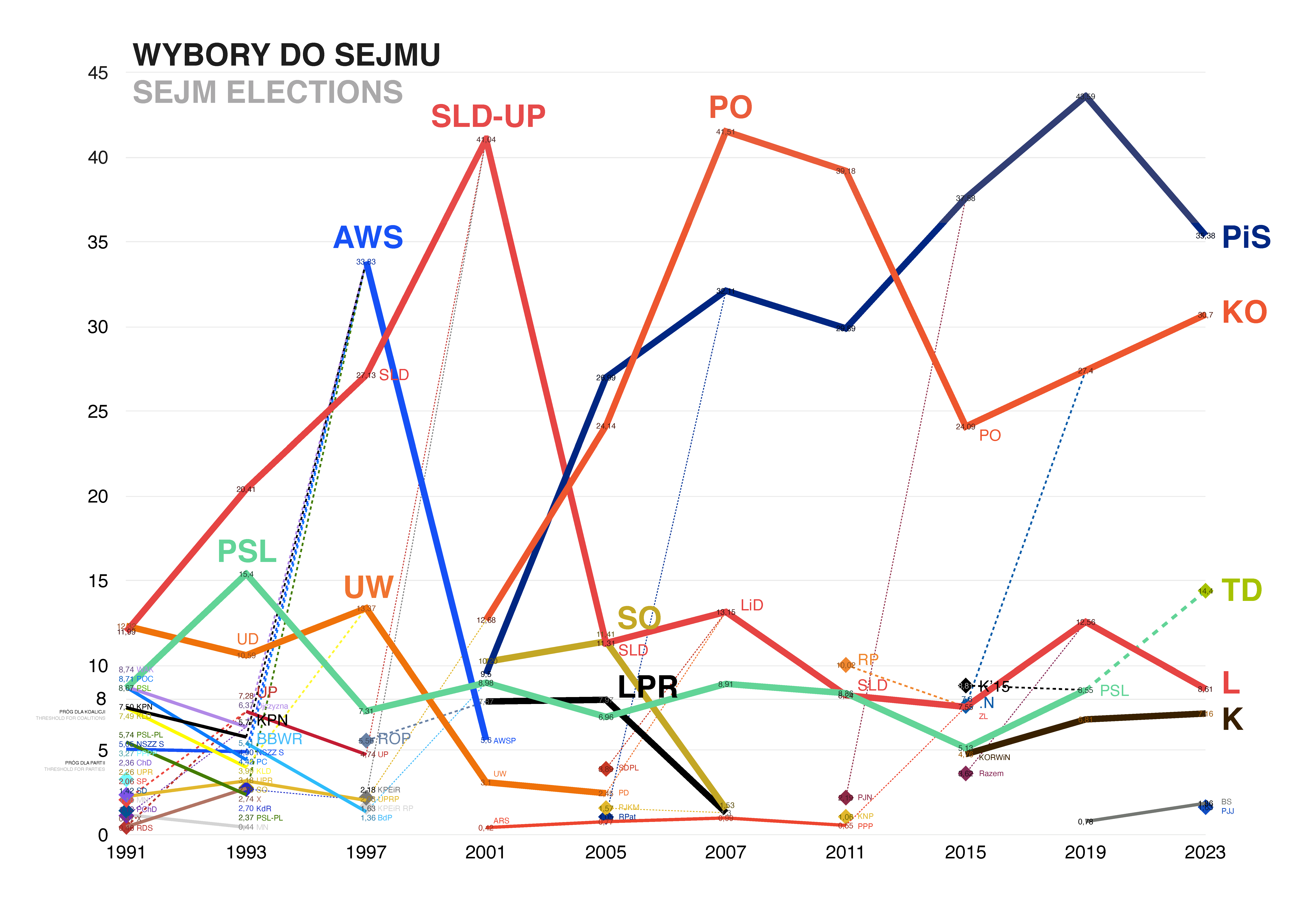

=== End of Communist rule ===
==== 1989 parliamentary elections ====
1989 Parliamentary Election: the Polish Round Table Agreement produced a partly open parliamentary election. The June election produced a Sejm (lower house), in which one-third of the seats went to communists and one-third went to the two parties which had hitherto been their coalition partners. The remaining one-third of the seats in the Sejm and all those in the Senate were freely contested; the majority of these were by candidates supported by Solidarity. Jaruzelski was elected by the Sejm as President of Poland.

The May 1990 local elections were entirely free. Candidates supported by Solidarity's Citizens' Committees won most of the elections they contested, although voter turnout was only a little over 40%. The cabinet was reshuffled in July 1990; the national defence and interior affairs ministers (hold-overs from the previous communist government) were among those replaced.

==== 1990 presidential election ====
In October 1990, the constitution was amended to curtail the term of President Jaruzelski. In December, Lech Wałęsa became the first popularly elected President of Poland.

==== 1991 parliamentary election ====
Poland's first free parliamentary elections were held in 1991. More than 100 parties participated, representing the full spectrum of political views. No single party received more than 13% of the total vote.

==== 1993 parliamentary election ====
After a rough start, the second group of elections were held in 1993, and the first parliament to serve a full term. The Democratic Left Alliance (SLD) received the largest share of votes.

After the election, the SLD and Polish People's Party (PSL) formed a governing coalition. Waldemar Pawlak, leader of the junior partner PSL, became prime minister, later replaced by SLD's leader Józef Oleksy.

==== 1995 presidential election ====
In November 1995, Poland held its second post-war free presidential election. SLD leader Aleksander Kwaśniewski defeated Wałęsa by a narrow margin—51.7% to 48.3%.

==== 1997 parliamentary election ====
In 1997 parliamentary elections two parties with roots in the Solidarity movement – Solidarity Electoral Action (AWS) and the Freedom Union (UW) – won 261 of the 460 seats in the Sejm and formed a coalition government. Jerzy Buzek of the AWS became prime minister. The AWS and the Democratic Left Allianc (SLD) held the majority of the seats in the Sejm. Marian Krzaklewski was the leader of the AWS, and Leszek Miller led the SLD. In June 2000, UW withdrew from the governing coalition, leaving AWS at the helm of a minority government.

=== Post-2000 elections ===
==== 2000 presidential election ====
In the presidential election of 2000, Aleksander Kwaśniewski, the incumbent former leader of the post-communist Democratic Left Alliance (SLD), was re-elected in the first round of voting, with 53.9% of the popular vote. Second place, with only 17.3%, went to Andrzej Olechowski. It is thought that the opposition campaign was hindered by their inability to put forward a charismatic (or even a single major) candidate, as well as falling support for the centre-right Solidarity Electoral Action (AWS) government. This was related to internal friction in the ruling parliamentary coalition.

==== 2001 parliamentary election ====
The 1997 Constitution and the changed administrative divisions of 1999 required a revision of the electoral system, which was passed in April 2001. The most important changes included:

1. the final liquidation of the party list (previously, some of the members of parliament were elected from a party list, based on nationwide voter support, rather than from local constituencies),
2. modification of the method of allocating seats to the Sainte-Laguë method, which gave less premium to large parties. The latter change was reverted to the d'Hondt method in 2002.

In the September 2001 parliamentary elections, the SLD won on the back of voter disillusionment with the AWS government and internal bickering within that bloc. So much so that this former ruling party did not enter parliament, falling below the 8% threshold for coalitions (they had failed to form a formal political party, which has only a 5% threshold, and formally remained a "coalition" of parties).

The SLD formed a coalition with the agrarian Polish Peasant Party and leftist Labour Union (UP), with Leszek Miller as prime minister.

==== 2005 presidential and parliament election ====
In the autumn of 2005 Poles voted in both parliamentary and presidential elections. September's parliamentary poll was expected to produce a coalition of two centre-right parties, Law and Justice (Prawo i Sprawiedliwość, PiS) and Civic Platform (Platforma Obywatelska, PO). PiS eventually gained 27% of votes cast and became the largest party in the sejm ahead of PO on 24%. The out-going ruling party, the left-wing Democratic Left Alliance (Sojusz Lewicy Demokratycznej, SLD), achieved just 11%. Presidential elections in October followed a similar script. The early favourite, Donald Tusk, leader of the PO, saw his opinion poll lead slip away and was beaten 54% to 46% in the second round by the PiS candidate Lech Kaczyński (one of the twins, founders of the party). Both elections were blighted by low turn-outs—only 51% in the second and deciding round of the presidential election, and just over 40% in the parliamentary election. The suggested cause of the low turnout is popular disillusionment with politicians.

==== 2007 parliamentary election ====
In the October parliamentary elections, the Civic Platform (PO) won a stunning victory, the largest opposition party, which gained more than 41% of the popular vote. PiS's vote increased, from 2005, but insufficiently to gain reelection, whilst both Samoobrona and LPR were wiped out, losing all representation, each having gained only a little over 1% of the vote. PO proceeded to form a majority governing coalition with the agrarian Polish People's Party (PSL), with PO leader, Donald Tusk, taking over the prime ministerial office in November 2007.

==== 2010 presidential election ====
On 10 April 2010, multiple members of the political elite were killed in the Smolensk air crash, including Lech Kaczyński, acting President of Poland.

At the presidential election in 2010, Donald Tusk decided not to present his candidature, considered easily winning over PiS leader Jarosław Kaczyński. At PO primary elections, Bronisław Komorowski defeated the Oxford-educated Foreign Minister Radosław Sikorski. At the polls, Komorowski defeated Jarosław Kaczyński, ensuring a PO dominance on all Polish political landscape.

In November 2010, local elections granted about 31 percent of the votes and PiS at 23 percent, an increase for the former and a drop for the latter compared to the 2006 elections. PO succeeded in winning four consecutive elections a record in post-communist Poland.

==== 2011 parliamentary election ====
The parliamentary election to both the Sejm and the Senate was held on 9 October 2011. The previous election, in 2007, resulted in a Civic Platform–Polish People's Party (PSL) government. All seats of both houses were up for re-election.

Civic Platform (PO), led by Prime Minister Donald Tusk, was aiming for re-election: a feat that hadn't been achieved since Poland became a democracy. The PSL was previously the smaller partner to the Civic Platform in the governing coalition, and had said that it wished to continue this relationship after the election.

==== 2015 parliamentary election ====
The parliamentary election to both the Sejm and the Senate was held in October 2015. The previous election, in 2011, resulted in a Civic Platform–Polish People's Party (PSL) government. All seats of both houses are up for re-election.

The process of election for the Sejm is through party-list proportional representation via the D'Hondt method in multi-seat constituencies, with a 5% threshold for single parties and 8% threshold for coalitions (requirements waived for national minorities). The following coalition has been signed already: Law and Justice (PiS) between United Poland (SP) and Polska Razem (PR).

==== 2019 European elections ====
Party or alliance		Votes	%	Seats	+/–
United Right	Law and Justice	4,775,790	34.99	21	+6
United Right	Solidary Poland	289,536	2.12	1	+1
United Right	Agreement	287,671	2.11	1	+1
United Right	Independents and others	839,783	6.15	4	+1
United Right	Total	6,192,780	45.38	27	+8
European Coalition	Civic Platform	2,904,440	21.28	12	−3
European Coalition	Democratic Left Alliance	812,584	5.95	5	+1
European Coalition	Polish People's Party	617,772	4.53	3	−1
European Coalition	Independents and others	915,139	6.71	2	–2
European Coalition	Total	5,249,935	38.47	22	−6
Spring		826,975	6.06	3	New
Confederation		621,188	4.55	0	0
Kukiz'15		503,564	3.69	0	New
Left Together		168,745	1.24	0	–1
Poland Fair Play		74,013	0.54	0	New
PolEXIT-Coalition		7,900	0.06	0	–4
Unity of Nation		2,211	0.02	0	New
Total		13,647,311	100.00	52	+1
Valid votes		13,647,311	99.17		
Invalid/blank votes		113,663	0.83		
Total votes		13,760,974	100.00		
Registered voters/turnout		30,118,852	45.69		
Source: PKW

==== 2019 parliamentary election ====
The 2019 Polish parliamentary elections were held on 13 October 2019. All 460 members of the Sejm and 100 senators of the Senate were elected. The ruling Law and Justice (PiS) retained its majority in the Sejm, but lost its majority in the Senate to the opposition. With 43.6% of the popular vote, Law and Justice received the highest vote share by any party since Poland returned to democracy in 1989. The turnout was the highest for a parliamentary election since the first free elections after the fall of communism in 1989. For the first time after 1989, the ruling party controls one house (Sejm) and opposition controls the second (Senate).

Electoral Committee (Sejm)	Votes	%	Seats	+/-
Law and Justice (PiS)	8,051,935	43.59	235	-5
Civic Coalition (KO)	5,060,355	27.40	134	-32
The Left (SLD)	2,319,946	12.56	49	+49
Polish Coalition (PSL)	1,578,523	8.55	30	-28
Confederation (KWiN)	1,256,953	6.81	11	+7
German Minority (MN)	32,094	0.17	1	±0
Nonpartisan local government activists (BS)	144,569	0.78	0	±0
Effective (Skuteczni)	18,918	0.10	0	-1
Action of Disappointed Retirees and Pensioners (AZER)	5,448	0.03	0	±0
Right Wing of the Republic (PR)	1,765	0.01	0	-1
Valid votes	18,470,710	98.89		
Blank and invalid votes	207,747	1.11		
Total	18,678,457	100	460	±0
Abstentions	11,575,099	38.26		
Registered voters / Turnout	30,253,556	61.74		
(Source: National Electoral Commission)

Electoral committee (Senate)	Votes	%	Seats	+/-
Law and Justice (PiS)	8,110,193	44.56	48	–13
Civic Coalition (KO)	6,490,306	35.66	43	+9
Polish Coalition (PSL)	1,041,909	5.72	3	+2
The Left	415,745	2.28	2	+2
Nonpartisan local government activists (BS)	331,385	1.82	0	±0
Confederation (KWiN)	144,124	0.79	0	±0
Independents	187,014	1.03	4	±0
Others	1,511,672	8.31	0	±0
Valid votes	18,201,348	97.45		
Blank and invalid votes	476,582	2.55		
Total	18,677,930	100	100	±0
Abstentions	11,575,626	38.26		
Registered voters / Turnout	30,253,556	61.74		
(Source: National Electoral Commission)

==== 2020 presidential election ====
The 2020 Polish presidential elections first round was held on 28 June 2020 and was completed with a second round of voting on 12 July 2020.

Candidate	Party	First round		Second round	
Candidate	Party	Votes	%	Votes	%
Andrzej Duda	Independent (PiS)	8,450,513	43.50	10,440,648	51.03
Rafał Trzaskowski	Civic Platform	5,917,340	30.46	10,018,263	48.97
Szymon Hołownia	Independent	2,693,397	13.87		
Krzysztof Bosak	Confederation (RN)	1,317,380	6.78		
Władysław Kosiniak-Kamysz	Polish People's Party	459,365	2.36		
Robert Biedroń	Spring	432,129	2.22		
Stanisław Żółtek	Congress of the New Right	45,419	0.23		
Marek Jakubiak	Federation for the Republic	33,652	0.17		
Paweł Tanajno	Independent	27,909	0.14		
Waldemar Witkowski	Labour Union	27,290	0.14		
Mirosław Piotrowski	Real Europe Movement	21,065	0.11		
Invalid/blank votes		58,301	–	177,724	–
Total		19,483,760	100	20,636,635	100
Registered voters/turnout		30,204,792	64.51	30,268,460	68.18
Source: Results, Turnout (first round); Results, Turnout (second round)

==== 2023 parliamentary election ====
The 2023 Polish parliamentary election was held on October 15. Although PiS won the most seats, they lost their majority. A coalition of the Civic Coalition (KO), the Left, and the Third Way took power with KO leader Donald Tusk taking over as prime minister.

Party or alliance		Votes	%	Seats	+/–
United Right	Law and Justice	6,286,250	29.11	157	−30
United Right	Sovereign Poland	465,024	2.15	18	+8
United Right	The Republicans	99,373	0.46	4	+3
United Right	Kukiz'15 (Note: Kukiz'15 previously ran under Polish Coalition as independents. The result does not include Paweł Kukiz who is not a party member, but got elected with 43,292 votes.)	74,959	0.35	2	New
United Right	Independents	715,248	3.31	13	−8
United Right	Total	7,640,854	35.39	194	−41
Civic Coalition	Civic Platform	4,992,932	23.12	122	+20
Civic Coalition	Modern	375,776	1.74	6	−2
Civic Coalition	Polish Initiative	252,021	1.17	3	+1
Civic Coalition	The Greens	67,392	0.31	3	0
Civic Coalition	AGROunia	53,571	0.25	1	New
Civic Coalition	Good Movement	8,254	0.04	0	New
Civic Coalition	Independents (Note: Two of the elected independents are also members of Yes! For Poland.)	879,645	4.07	22	+3
Civic Coalition	Total	6,629,402	30.70	157	+23
Third Way	Poland 2050 (Note: Includes 233,917 votes and 2 seats for supported independents.)	1,561,542	7.23	33	New
Third Way	Polish People's Party (Note: Includes 23,051 votes and 1 seat for supported independents.)	1,189,629	5.51	28	+9
Third Way	Centre for Poland	70,117	0.32	3	+3
Third Way	Union of European Democrats	21,056	0.10	0	−1
Third Way	Independents and others	268,326	1.24	1	−9
Third Way	Total	3,110,670	14.41	65	+35
The Left	New Left	1,199,503	5.55	19	−19
The Left	Left Together	453,730	2.10	7	+1
The Left	Independents and others	205,785	0.95	0	−5
The Left	Total	1,859,018	8.61	26	−23
Confederation	New Hope	551,901	2.56	6	+1
Confederation	Confederation (Note: Confederation was registered as a party to circumvent the 8% electoral threshold for electoral coalitions. Five of its elected members are part of National Movement, one of New Hope and one of Confederation of the Polish Crown.)	341,188	1.58	7	+7
Confederation	National Movement	199,149	0.92	0	−5
Confederation	Confederation of the Polish Crown	182,573	0.85	2	+1
Confederation	Independents and others	268,985	1.25	3	+3
Confederation	Total	1,547,364	7.17	18	+7
Nonpartisan Local Government Activists		401,054	1.86	0	0
There is One Poland		351,099	1.63	0	New
German Minority		25,778	0.12	0	−1
Prosperity and Peace Movement		24,850	0.12	0	New
Normal Country		4,606	0.02	0	New
Anti-party		1,156	0.01	0	New
Repair Poland Movement		823	0.00	0	New
Total		21,593,295	100.00	460	0
Valid votes		21,596,674	98.31		
Invalid/blank votes		370,217	1.69		
Total votes		21,966,891	100.00		
Registered voters/turnout		29,532,595	74.38		
Source: National Electoral Commission,

==== 2024 Polish local elections ====
The 2024 local elections were held in two rounds on April 7 and April 21, 2024. Although Law and Justice (PiS) won the most overall popular votes in the regional assembly elections, the governing coalition made up of the Civic Coalition, Third Way, and The Left secured majorities in a majority of the voivodeships.

===== Voivodeship councils =====
Party	Votes	%	+/–	Seats	+/–
Law and Justice	4,941,092	34.27	▲0.14	239	▼15
Civic Coalition	4,409,607	30.59	▲3.62	210	▲16
Third Way	2,054,152	14.25	▲2.18	80	▲10
Confederation and Nonpartisan Localists	1,042,328	7.23	▲4.38	6	▲6
The Left	911,430	6.32	▼1.87	8	▼3
Bezpartyjni Samorządowcy	434,086	3.01	▼2.27	3	▼12
National Polish Local Government Coalition	165,714	1.15	New	1	New
Normal Country	86,994	0.60	New	0	New
Silesian Localists	53,338	0.37	▲0.03	5	Steady
Liberal Poland – Entrepreneurs' Strike	52,160	0.36	New	0	New
Silesian Autonomy Movement	50,361	0.35	▼0.03	0	Steady
Defence of Poland Movement	37,283	0.26	New	0	New
Silesians Together	36,730	0.25	▼0.12	0	Steady
Repair Poland Movement	34,457	0.24	New	0	New
Self-Governed Pomerania	32,709	0.23	New	0	New
Democratic Left Association	13,169	0.09	New	0	New
Slavic Union	11,565	0.08	▲0.06	0	Steady
National Action	9,231	0.06	▲0.02	0	Steady
Citizens for Citizens	8,590	0.06	New	0	New
Citizens and Justice	7,177	0.05	New	0	New
Self-Defence of the Republic of Poland	5,923	0.04	New	0	New
Civic Initiative	5,495	0.04	▼0.05	0	Steady
Good of the Gmina	3,499	0.02	New	0	New
Movement of Łukasz Konarski	3,494	0.02	New	0	New
Azure Poland	2,883	0.02	New	0	New
Geothermal Rawa Mazowiecka	2,281	0.02	New	0	New
Self-Defence	1,317	0.01	New	0	New
Total	14,417,065	100.00	–	552	0
Valid votes	14,417,065	95.56			
Invalid/blank votes	670,255	4.44			
Total votes	15,087,320	100.00			
Registered voters/turnout	29,046,002	51.94			

==== 2025 Polish presidential election ====
The 2025 presidential election was held in two rounds on May 18 and June 1, 2025. Progressive-liberal Warsaw mayor Rafał Trzaskowski narrowly won the first round, but was defeated in the runoff by conservative Institute of National Remembrance director Karol Nawrocki. Backed by the Law and Justice party, Nawrocki secured the presidency with 50.89% of the vote.

Candidate	Party	First round		Second round	
Candidate	Party	Votes	%	Votes	%
Karol Nawrocki	Independent (PiS)	5,790,804	29.54	10,606,877	50.89
Rafał Trzaskowski	Civic Coalition (PO)	6,147,797	31.36	10,237,286	49.11
Sławomir Mentzen	Confederation (New Hope)	2,902,448	14.81		
Grzegorz Braun	Polish Crown	1,242,917	6.34		
Szymon Hołownia	Third Way (Poland 2050)	978,901	4.99		
Adrian Zandberg	Partia Razem	952,832	4.86		
Magdalena Biejat	Independent (The Left)	829,361	4.23		
Krzysztof Stanowski	Independent	243,479	1.24		
Joanna Senyszyn	Independent (SLD)	214,198	1.09		
Marek Jakubiak	Free Republicans	150,698	0.77		
Artur Bartoszewicz	Independent	95,640	0.49		
Maciej Maciak	Independent (RDiP)	36,371	0.19		
Marek Woch	Bezpartyjni Samorządowcy	18,338	0.09		
Total		19,603,784	100.00	20,844,163	100.00
Valid votes		19,603,784	99.56	20,844,163	99.10
Invalid/blank votes		85,813	0.44	189,294	0.90
Total votes		19,689,597	100.00	21,033,457	100.00
Registered voters/turnout		29,252,340	67.31	29,363,722	71.63
Source: National Electoral Commission

Vote share
Second round
Nawrocki	50.89%
Trzaskowski	49.11%
First round
Trzaskowski	31.36%
Nawrocki	29.54%
Mentzen	14.81%
Braun	6.34%
Hołownia	4.99%
Zandberg	4.86%
Biejat	4.23%
Stanowski	1.24%
Senyszyn	1.09%
Others	1.54%

== See also ==
- Electoral districts of Poland
