= Polish presidential elections =

Polish presidential elections determine who will serve as the president of Poland for the next five years.

== Procedure ==
The president of Poland is elected by universal and direct suffrage and cannot be elected more than twice.

=== Nomination of candidates ===
The right to stand as a candidate is granted to all eligible voters who are at least 35 years of age on the election day. A candidate must gather 100,000 signatures.

=== Popular vote ===
Any Polish citizen who is at least 18 years of age on the election day and who is not deprived of the right to vote is eligible to elect the president.

The president is elected by direct popular vote in a two-round majoritarian contest.

The candidate who receives over 50 % of the valid votes is elected president. If no candidate receives the majority of votes, the two candidates with the most votes advance to the second (run-off) round that is held exactly 14 days after the first. If one of these two candidates withdraws or loses their voting eligibility or dies, the candidate with the next highest number of votes advances to the second round instead. In such an event, the second round is postponed for another 14 days.

== List of Polish presidential elections ==
=== Indirect elections ===
In the Second Polish Republic

- 1922 Polish presidential elections
- 1926 Polish presidential elections
- 1933 Polish presidential election

In the Republic of Poland / Polish People's Republic

- 1947 Polish presidential election
- 1989 Polish presidential election

=== Direct elections ===
In the Third Polish Republic

- 1990 Polish presidential election
- 1995 Polish presidential election
- 2000 Polish presidential election
- 2005 Polish presidential election
- 2010 Polish presidential election
- 2015 Polish presidential election
- 2020 Polish presidential election
- 2025 Polish presidential election

== See also ==
- Elections in Poland
