= Krzysztof Kukucki =

Polish politician

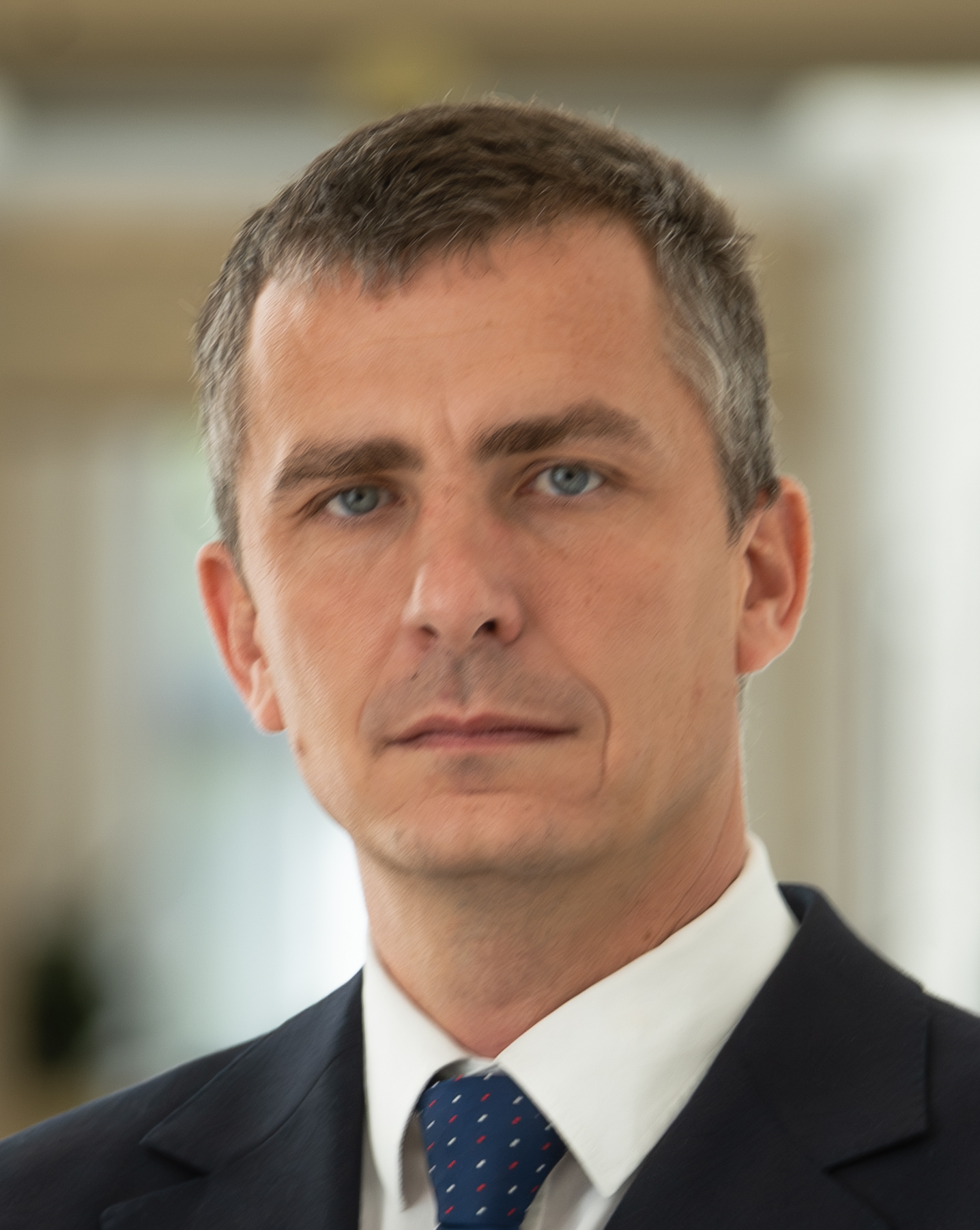

Krzysztof Aleksander Kukucki (born 25 October 1980 in Włocławkek) is a Polish politician and Mayor of Włocławek since 2024.

== Biography ==
Son of Ignacy and Krystyna. Graduate of the Kazimierz Wielki University in Bydgoszcz.

He began his career as a Democratic Left Alliance activist. In the 2010 local elections, he was for the first time elected as a councillor of Włocławek. He was reelected in 2014 and 2018. In 2018 he also ran for the office of Mayor of Włocławek. In January 2019, the Mayor of Włocławek, Marek Wojtkowski, gave Kukucki the office of Deputy Mayor.

In 2023 he successfully ran for the Senate.

In the 2024 local elections he was elected President of Włocławek, defeating Wojtkowski with 56,28% of the vote.
