= Zygmunt Marek =

Polish politician

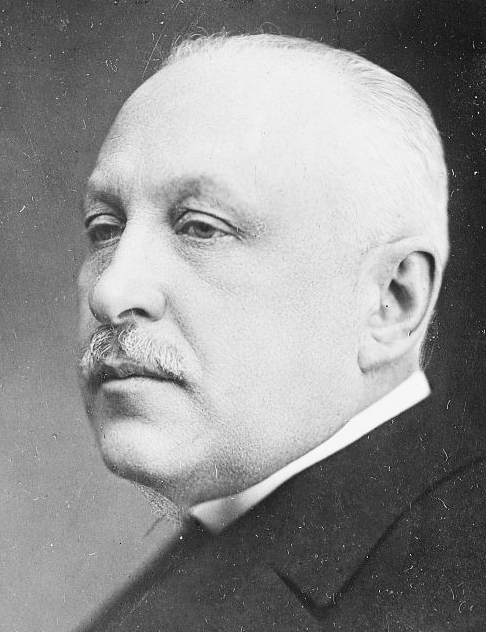

Vice chairman of the Sejm
- In office 27 March 1928 – 25 January 1930

Personal details
- Born: 19 March 1872 Kraków, Austro-Hungary
- Died: 8 November 1931 (aged 59) Kraków, Second Polish Republic
- Party: Polish Socialist Party

Zygmunt Stanisław Marek (born March 19, 1872, in Kraków, died 8 November 1931 in Kraków) was a Polish socialist politician.

After graduating from gymnasium he studied law. He joined the Polish Social Democratic Party of Galicia (PPSD) in 1890. Marek was a chief editor of the newspaper Więzien polityczny (Political prisoner) and Naprzód (Forward) during World War I. In 1919, after Poland regained independence after years of partitions, he joined the united Polish Socialist Party (PPS).

Elected Sejm member the same year, he became chairman of the PPS caucus, replacing Norbert Barlicki in 1926. On May 31, 1926, he nominated Józef Piłsudski for President. Piłsudski was elected by National Assembly for this post, but decided against taking office. As a result, PPS drafted their own candidate in next election, held on June 1, and Marek became a nominee. He faced Piłsudski-backed chemistry professor Ignacy Mościcki and Poznań Voivode Adolf Bniński, who represented the right wing. In the first round he placed last with 56 votes (against 215 for Mościcki and 211 for Bniński). In the runoff he finished last again, with just one vote (Mościcki defeated Bniński 281 to 200).

Marek served as a Sejm Vice-Marshal from 1928 to 1931. He was the father of Krystyna Marek, Polish-Swiss professor of public international law.

== See also ==
- 1926 Polish presidential elections
