= Prosperity and Peace Movement =

Polish socio-political movement and committee of voters

Prosperity and Peace Movement Ruch Dobrobytu i Pokoju
- Abbreviation: RDiP
- Leader: Maciej Maciak
- Founded: 2022
- Ideology: Communism; Welfare nationalism Left-conservatism; Euroscepticism; Russophilia
- Political position: Left-wing
- Colors: Red; Blue
- Sejm: 0 / 460
- Senate: 0 / 100
- European Parliament: 0 / 53
- Regional assemblies: 0 / 552

Website
- kwwrdip.pl
- Politics of Poland; Political parties; Elections; a: Also described as right-wing.

Prosperity and Peace Movement (Polish: Ruch Dobrobytu i Pokoju, RDiP) is a socio-political movement (as well as electoral committee of voters in the 2023 Polish parliamentary election), founded in 2022 by journalist Maciej Maciak, on the basis of the programme "You need to know this" (Polish: Musisz to wiedzieć) created and hosted by him on YouTube.

== History ==
The movement mainly organized via Telegram, which it relied on to gather members and supporters. Prior to creating the party, Maciak was affiliated with the Self-Defence of the Republic of Poland (Samoobrona), and ran on the movement's electoral list in the 2006 Polish local elections to the Kuyavian–Pomeranian Voivodeship Sejmik. Maciak was also a member of Bezpartyjni Samorządowcy. Later, he participated in 2018 mayoral elections in Włocławek, where he came 8th on the list in his electoral district. He won 14% of the popular vote, considered a minor upset as he polled only 1%. In the runoff, he endorsed Marek Wojtkowski from Civic Platform, seeing him as lesser evil compared to Jarosław Chmielewski from Law and Justice. Maciak founded a local TV station CW 24tv in 2009, and was its director for 10 years. The station was controversial for hosting and interviewing a pro-Russian activist Konstantin Knyrik, and supporting the 2014 Russian annexation of Crimea. The station shut down after 10 years of broadcasting on 12 July 2019.

In the 2023 elections, KWW RDiP registered lists of candidates in 11 out of 41 districts for the Sejm of the Republic of Poland and three candidates for the Senate of the Republic of Poland. Only non-partisans ran on behalf of the movement. Its leader Maciej Maciak. When the Prosperity and Peace Movement tried to register its electoral list on 11 August 2023 after gathering the necessary signatures, its electoral committee was unable to be registered because of a sudden shutdown of the Ministry of Digital Affairs servers. This forced the movement to register its electoral lists on a later date; Maciak dubbed this event "the first scandal of this [year's] electoral campaign". In the elections to the Sejm, the DiP Movement received 0.12% of the vote, coming 9th (losing to the nationwide committees and the German Minority Electoral Committee, which was registered in one constituency). Candidates of the movement for the Senate took the last places in the districts.

The movement ran in the 2024 Polish local elections as the Voters' Electoral Committee "Alternative" (Polish: KWW Alternatywa). The movement won 14 gmina council seats in the Subcarpathian Voivodeship, overperforming a major party like Bezpartyjni Samorządowcy (which won 13 seats) and nearly tying with the Third Way party (which won 15 seats) in the voivodeship. Maciak run again for the position of Mayor of Włocławek in the 2024 mayoral election, where he received 7.42% of the vote.

In 2024, the movement organized protests in Wrocław and Szczecin calling for the release of Julian Assange. The Prosperity and Peace Movement registered an electoral committee in the 2024 European Parliament election in Poland, but it did not manage to gather enough signatures to field candidates. It also participated in the 2024 Polish farmers' protests, joining the protesting farmers in Domaniewice. In March 2024, the Prosperity and Peace Movement also organized a "Walk of Peace" in Lubartów, protesting Polish involvement in the Russian-Ukrainian War and opposing the Israeli invasion of Gaza.

Maciak declared his candidacy for the 2025 Polish presidential election, and the Prosperity and Peace Movement registered his presidential committee. On 26 March, Maciak gathered the required amount of signatures needed to appear on the ballot and formally submitted his candidacy.

== Election results ==
=== Presidential ===
Election year	Candidate	1st round		2nd round	
Election year	Candidate	Votes	%	Votes	%
2025	Maciej Maciak	36,371	0.19 (#12)	Boycott	

=== Sejm ===
Election	Votes	%	Seats	+/–	Government
2023	24,850	0.12 (#9)	0 / 460	New entry	Extra-parliamentary

=== Senate ===
Election	Votes	%	Seats	+/–	Government
2023	20,672	0.10 (#16)	0 / 100	New entry	Extra-parliamentary

=== Włocławek mayor ===
Election year	Candidate	# of votes	% of vote	Place	Elected?	Runoff
2018	Maciej Maciak	6,085	14.13%	4th	No	Endorsed Marek Wojtkowski (Civic Platform)
2024	Maciej Maciak	2,588	7.42%	4th	No	

=== Gmina councils ===
Election	# of votes	% of vote	Seats	+/–
2024	2,864	0.02%	14 / 39,416	New entry

== Ideology ==
The movement has been described as left-wing, or as pro-redistribution and conservative otherwise. It postulates increasing social benefits, implementing a system of state vouchers that can only be used on domestic Polish businesses, improving the living conditions of the pensioners, implementing restrictions on foreign capital, and ensuring cheap prices of water, gas and electricity. Polityka describes its program to be based on tenets such as social state for Poles only, prohibitive conditions for foreign capital, the development of renewable energy sources, the verification of debts incurred by previous governments, environmental protection, and energy supply from Russia. Since 2025, the party came to be described as communist; Maciak has praised the Soviet Union, and in 2026 stated that he supports the "Chinese system", adding: "Yes, there is communism there." He also stated that "wars are inherent to capitalism".

Maciak declares his electorate the "true people of the left". He accuses mainstream left-wing parties of extravagance, stating that they "promote demands that benefit multinational corporations and their core is made up of barons who are subcontractors of these corporations". Maciak spoke positively of Leszek Miller, a former Polish Prime Minister of Democratic Left Alliance who was also associated with Samoobrona. Maciak is also frequently accused of using pro-Russian and anti-Ukrainian talking points, as he spoke positively of the Russian annexation of Crimea. Maciak argues that Ukrainians are manipulated and exploited by the USA. RDiP opposes EU expansion and prioritizes economic matters, and was described as "classical liberal" in its approach towards the EU.

Describing the party, Newsweek wrote that RDiP postulates "increasing social benefits, building pumped-storage power plants and limiting foreign capital by introducing complex taxes for foreign investors", and that it also "criticises the European Union and expresses positive opinions about Vladimir Putin's policies." The program of the movement is described to be based on "social solidarity, economic independence and a peaceful foreign policy". As its main goals, it lists the expansion of social care for senior citizens, introduction of restrictions for foreign capital in the protection of Polish farmers and entrepreneurs, development of domestic energy industry, environmental protection, and measures to guarantee cheap gas, water and electricity. The movement is committed to peaceful foreign policy which will be based on cooperating with all of Poland's neighbours, especially Russia.

=== Social issues ===
On social issues, the party has been described as "progressive", as it supports "solutions aimed at reducing inequality and exclusion". It supports traditional family and criticizes modern trends in education for weakening national identity. Maciak has criticized feminism as well as perceived hypocrisy of Polish Catholics. The party postulates a need to rebuild a "healthy society" in Poland by combating individualism in favor of collective cooperation, and fostering patriotism instead of internationalism. Regarding abortion, Maciak emphasized that he is a Catholic, but "cannot and does not want to encroach on God's prerogative and use the law to restrict decisions that everyone should make according to their own conscience". He deemed total abortion ban unacceptable, but praised the abortion compromise before the 2020–2021 women's strike protests in Poland which restricted abortion to cases of rape, danger to health or health abnormality as optimal. Maciak also opposes same-sex unions and LGBT parades.

On behalf of the party, Maciak's electoral committee for the 2025 Polish presidential election had declared itself in support of preserving the crime of offending religious feelings in Polish penal code, and also supported anti-hate speech laws, state-financed in vitro programs, removal of religious symbols from public buildings, and strictly voluntary military. It wants to preserve the concordat with the Catholic Church, but renegotiate it; it also spoke in favor of preserving religious class in schools, but moving it out of school to churches or catechetical halls. The committee spoke against same-sex marriage, same-sex civil unions, same-sex adoption, legalizing marijuana, death penalty, and loosening gun laws in Poland. It favored restricting immigration to Poland.

=== Environment ===
In regards to its environmental proposals, the movement calls for expansion of renewable energy sources, construction of pumped-storage power plants and implementation of 'pro-ecological strategies' in the Polish economy. It promotes the decentralisation of energy system and criticizes nuclear energy. Maciak's electoral committee opposed the proposal to ban using coal for heating within 5 years. It stated that the Polish energy supply should be based on both renewable energy sources, as well as the traditional ones such as gas and coal. It spoke against policies that would promote public transportation at expense of car transport. It agreed with the statement that economic growth is more important than fighting climate change, and opposed the energy transition policies of the European Union.

=== Economy ===
The Prosperity and Peace Movement calls for a "rapid resuscitation of the Polish economy" through ensuring cheap energy supply and reducing the threat of war. It calls for reconciling with Russia, arguing that the support for Ukraine and sanctions against Russia came at an extreme cost to Polish taxpayers, causing a hike in living costs and sluggish economy in the long term. The party has spoken against immigration, stating that it has negative effects and serves the interest of big capital rather than society as a whole. When asked about his economic views, Maciak stated: "In short, I like the Chinese system. Yes, there is communism there." He was described as protectionist and populist, proposing state-issued commodity vouchers for domestic use only and taxes targeting foreign capital.

During the 2025 Polish presidential election, on behalf of Maciak's candidacy, the party spoke for publicly funded health care, state price controls, more progressive taxes on the wealthy, and increasing the "500+" family pension from 800 PLN to 1000 PLN or more. It spoke against allowing Ukrainian immigrants access to Polish welfare system, entering the Eurozone, and shortening the work week. The party agreed with the statement that the Polish economic regulations are too restrictive on businesses, and proposed simplifying construction regulations to solve the housing crisis. It also argued that the trade ban on Sundays should be lifted, and opposed equalizing the retirement age between men and women.

The party also advocates the introduction of elements of sharing economy and solidarity economy, along with expanding social aspects of the Polish economy and workplace democracy. It strongly opposes raising the retirement age and postulates introducing "decent pensions". It argues that a healthy economy can be built in Poland through combating individualism and promoting collectivism. The main issue that Prosperity and Peace Movement sees in the Polish economy is foreign capital, which it denounces as destabilizing. Party's proposals include tax cuts for domestic companies, imposition of high fees on foreign capital, restricting the activity of multinational corporations, state-issued vouchers to support domestic businesses, and restricting immigration.

Speaking of sanctions against Russia and their economic consequences, the leader of the movement states: "There have been cases of abusive parents starving their children to prevent them from being overtaken by the ‘demon of gluttony’ and leading them into extreme exhaustion. I have the impression that at the moment we are dealing with a stepmother in the form of Polish politicians who, due to strange ideas so that the demon does not take over us, are causing serious damage to the economy and the national fabric." In regards to the party's proposals, Adam Willma wrote:

Most of the Movement's demands could be endorsed by both the Left and the Razem party: higher benefits, pensions ‘without poverty and hardship’, cheap access to basic utilities, and measures to curb large corporations. Apart from organisations directly referring to communist ideology and grotesque comrades led by actor Wojciech Olszański, this is the only group that is openly pro-Putin.

The movement supports the "800 plus" program that grants Polish families 800 PLN monthly per child, and postulated doubling the program's pensions to 1600 PLN. One of the movement's electoral slogans is "a villa with a swimming pool for every Pole" (Polish: willa z basenem dla każdego Polaka). Another of the movement's proposals is the introduction of high taxes for businesses in industries such as trade and banking, arguing that these industries are "easy, simple, intuitive", creating a lot of market manipulation and abuse. The DiP also declares its readiness to form a coalition with any party. Another one of its slogans was "water, gas, electricity" (Polish: woda, gaz, prąd). It supports the cadastral tax in order to reduce speculation in the real estate market, postulating a tax that would apply to large property owners and from which the funds will be used to fund housing programs for young families.

=== Foreign policy ===
Prosperity and Peace Movement opposes the European Union and NATO, arguing that Poland should become at least as assertive against these institutions as Robert Fico of Slovakia or Viktor Orbán of Hungary. The party accuses Ukraine of carrying out terrorist attacks on Russian territory using NATO weapons and argues that Russia is wrongly held responsible for various types of attacks. The movement also states that Ukraine has no good intentions towards Poland, describing the Ukrainian soldiers as "adorned with swastikas and Wehrmacht crosses". RDiP calls for the end of the war in Ukraine, warning against the damage to Polish economy and living cost if Poland continues to gear its economy towards war and implements general mobilization. It also argues that Ukraine should recognize the Donetsk and Lugansk People's Republics; RDiP promised to "stop the war in 24 hours" by closing all routes that Western aid flows through Poland to Ukraine. Polityka has described the party as supportive of Vladimir Putin and Alexander Lukashenko.

The party has argued that the 2014 Russian annexation of Crimea was legal, and stated that the Russo-Ukrainian War had been caused by "foreign capital". It has criticized the reports of Russian war crimes, stating that there are less casualties than claimed by Western media. Maciak described Putin, Lukashenko and Xi Jinping as the "beacons of normality" in a world ruled by "evil capital". Conversely, the Prosperity and Peace Movement postulated diplomatic reconciliation of Poland with Russia and Belarus, and making Poland the central partner of China in Europe. It also holds anti-Atlanticist views; Maciak praised the Soviet Union, claiming that the USSR did not kill civilians during World War II, but that the United States and Western Allies did.
