= Krystyna Marek =

Polish university teacher (1914–1993)

- Born: 11 October 1914; Kraków, Poland
- Died: 30 March 1993 (aged 78); Bern, Switzerland
- Occupation: Academic
- Parent: Zygmunt Marek

Academic background
- Education: Jagiellonian University; Graduate Institute of International Studies; University of Geneva
- Thesis: Identity and Continuity of States in Public International Law
- Doctoral advisor: Paul Guggenheim

Academic work
- Discipline: International public law

Krystyna Marek (11 October 1914 – 30 March 1993) was a Swiss-Polish professor of international law. Edward Raczynski, Minister of Foreign Affairs of the Polish government in exile, called her "one of the first Polish female diplomats."

== Biography ==
Krystyna Marek was born into a family of lawyers. Her father, Zygmunt Marek, was a member of Sejm and leader of the Polish Socialist Party. Following her father's death in 1931, she moved to Switzerland, where she completed high school. She returned to Poland and in 1937 graduated in law from the Jagiellonian University.

With the outbreak of war, she fled Poland with her family, eventually arriving in London in 1941 where she took up work for the Polish government in exile.

Following the Second World War she worked for Radio Free Europe in Munich and contributed to Kultura, the Paris-based Polish emigre literary journal.

Marek returned to Switzerland and completed a doctoral thesis in the field of international law in 1954 at the University of Geneva's Graduate Institute of International Studies. The resulting book, Identity and Continuity of States in Public International Law, was the first full length monograph on the topic and considered "brilliant." She worked at the University of Geneva and in 1967 was appointed full professor at the Graduate Institute of International Studies, where she also held the position of Director of the Department of Public International Law.

In the 1980s she was active in organising international support for Solidarity.

She died in 1993 and was buried at the Rakowicki Cemetery in Kraków.
