= Maciej Maciak =

Polish journalist and politician (born 1970)

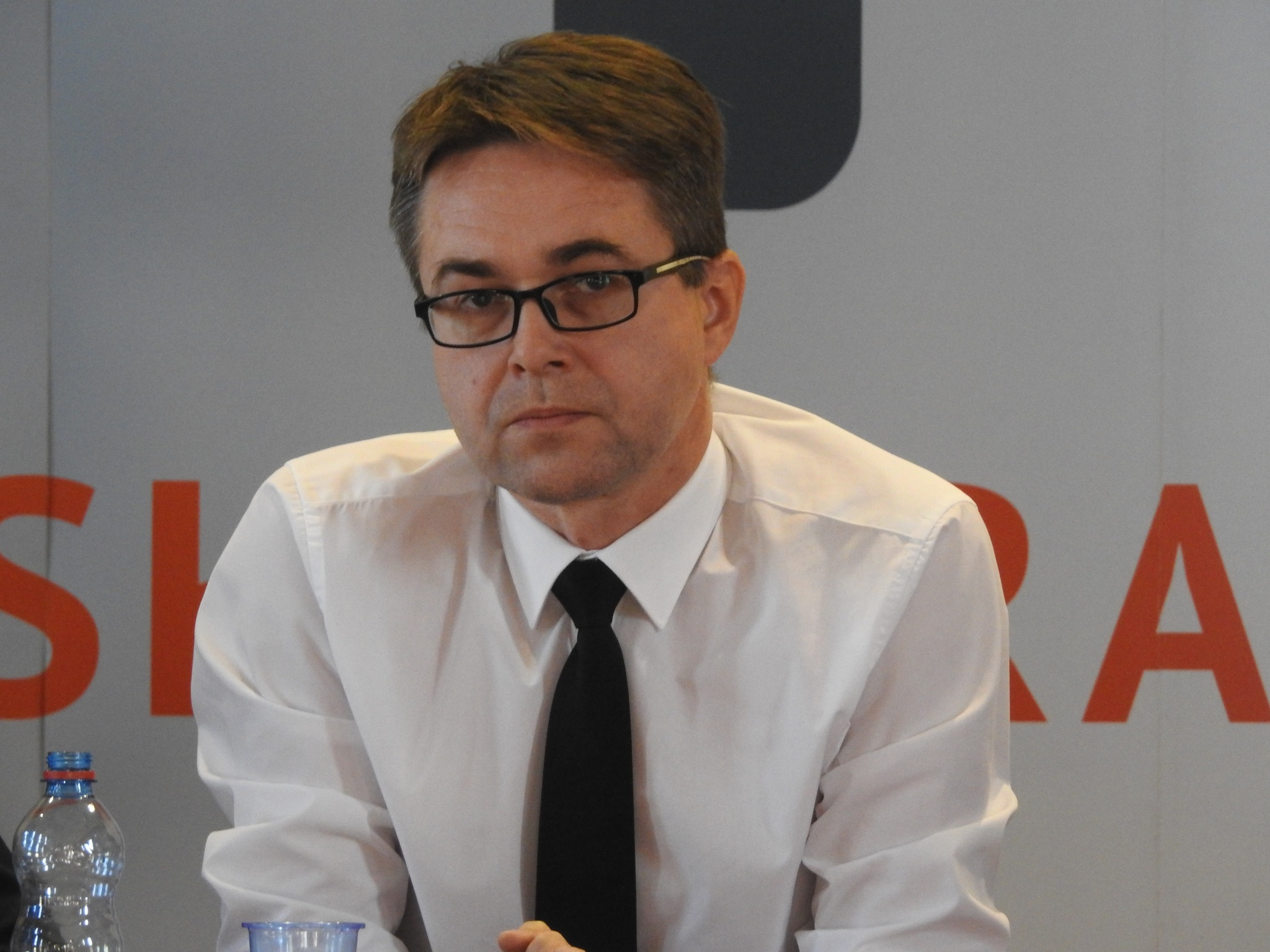
- Maciej Maciak in 2025

Personal details
- Born: 19 June 1970 (age 56) Włocławek, Poland
- Party: Prosperity and Peace Movement
- Other party: Bezpartyjni Samorządowcy (formerly); Self-Defence of the Republic of Poland (formerly)

Maciej Maciak (born 19 June 1970 in Włocławek) is a Polish journalist and politician, leader of the Prosperity and Peace Movement (RDiP) and candidate for the 2025 Polish presidential election.

== Biography ==
Maciak was born in Włocławek and is tied with local media. Since 2009, for 10 years he directed the local television "CW 24tv". Afterwards, he started the YouTube channel "Musisz to wiedzieć", which by the time of his presidential campaign reached 67,000 subscribers.

Maciak is involved in politics. In 2006, 36-year-old Maciak contested the election for the Kuyavian–Pomeranian Voivodeship Sejmik for Self-Defence of the Republic of Poland, where he won 500 votes. Meanwhile, he was also sympathetic to the League of Polish Families.

In 2018, he ran for President of Włocławek along a slate of candidates supportive of him to the city council, which secured 7.80% of the vote and no seats, whereas he himself received 14.13% of the vote. In 2019, he attempted to contest the election to the 13th Senate district for the Bezpartyjni Samorządowcy, but with 328 of the signatures supporting his candidacy rejected by the electoral authorities, he came 51 signatures short of the required amount to be put on the ballot. In 2024, he again ran for the office of President of Włocławek, earning 7.42% of the vote. He declared his candidacy in the 2025 Polish presidential election.

Maciak's first big political success was registering the Prosperity and Peace Movement to the 2023 Polish parliamentary election, where the movement won 24,850 votes (0.12%), coming ahead of the Normal Country, "Anti-party" and Repair Poland Movement parties in the Sejm and 20,672 votes (0.10%) in the Senat. He was the party's candidate for poseł in the Sejm Constituency no. 5 with the number 8 on its lists, and personally received 1,298 votes (0.24%), whereas his party in the constituency received 2,266 (0.42%).

He announced his start in the 2025 presidential election, successfully registering with 100,000 signatures. Since the start of the campaign, he was considered one of the more recognizable candidates from outside the major political organizations. His name recognition was further expanded after appearing at the TVP debate on 11 April. For the duration of the day, most searches on the internet were related to him. Minister of National Defence Kosiniak-Kamysz questioned whether his registration as candidate is legitimate, saying he should be investigated.

== Views ==
Maciak declares himself an enemy of big capital and supports limiting its influence by raising taxes on them, and supports expanding retirement pensions and social welfare programs. He was formerly associated with the far-left party Self-Defence of the Republic of Poland. He spoke against legalizing abortion and in favor of restoring the pre-2020 law, which allowed abortion only in exceptional cases.

In terms of foreign policy, Maciak declares himself a pacifist, praising China, deeming its politics "perfect", Russia, which he sees as the world's second superpower, and especially Viktor Orbán's Hungary, which he sees as his foreign policy model, able to compromise with the United States and Russia. Maciak admires the President of Russia, Vladimir Putin. Maciak believes that Poland should follow the pacifist policy of Costa Rica. He was accused of being a Russophile, a view which he rejects.

== Private life ==
Maciak is a bachelor and has no pets. He knows English, but does not speak it fluently. He is a smoker. He is a Roman Catholic.

== Controversies ==
In 2019, he was brought to court for insulting Emanuel Kalejaiye, a Nigerian doctor that was running for President of Włocławek against him in 2018 (receiving 2.33% of the vote).

On April 30, 2025, Maciak was invited to an interview by Krzysztof Stanowski on Kanał Zero. Within two minutes of the start of the interview, Stanowski left, stating he did not wish to provide a platform for such views, leaving Maciak alone in the studio, who left a few minutes later. The incident garnered significant media attention and sparked discussions regarding the boundaries of acceptable discourse in political interviews.

Maciak was the only candidate not invited to all 3 debates hosted by TV Republika, whose host, Katarzyna Gójska, stated "The Home of Free Speech will never be a place for a fan of a genocidist and a man who directed threats against us". The debate of campaign staffers hosted by Polsat News, was opened by Piotr Witwicki: "If anyone wants to listen to Maciej Maciak's staff, they shall turn on Russia Today," commented on later by Maciak: "Unfortunately, the truth is much more often on Russia Today, than on Polsat."

== Electoral history ==
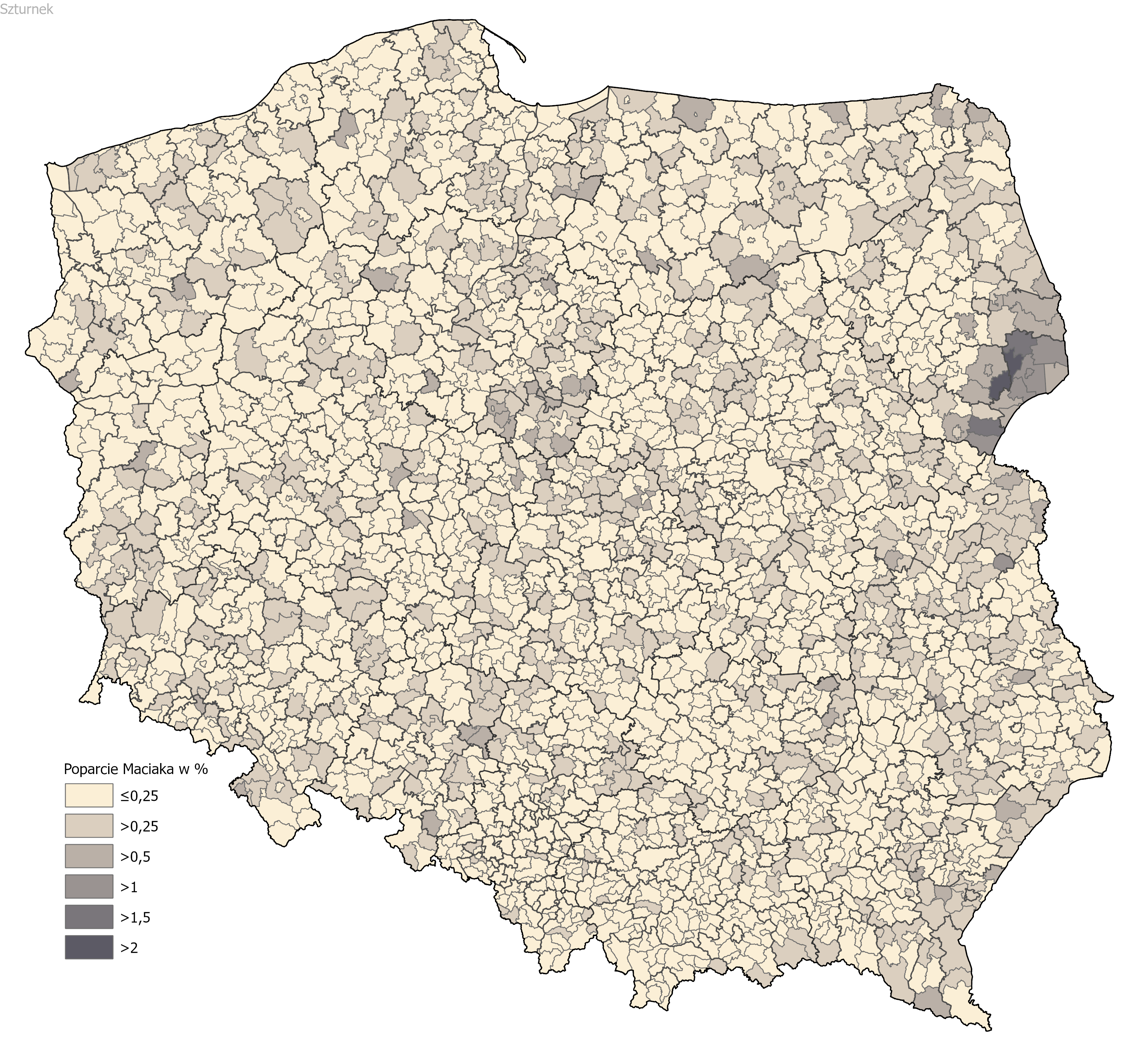
Maciej Maciak's results in the 2025 presidential election. He obtained the highest result in gmina Orla (2,51%), while in 46 gminas he did not receive a single vote

=== Sejm ===
Election year	Party	# of votes	% of vote	District	Elected?
2023	Prosperity and Peace Movement	1,298	0.24%	Sejm Constituency no. 5	No

=== Mayor of Włocławek ===
Election year	Party	# of votes	% of vote	Elected?
2018	Independent	6,085	14.13%	No
2024	Independent	2,588	7.42%	No

=== Regional assemblies ===
Election year	Party	# of votes	% of vote	Sejmik	Elected?
2006	Self-Defence of the Republic of Poland	500	0.43%	Kuyavian-Pomeranian	No

=== President ===
Election year	Party	# of votes	% of vote	Elected?
2025	Prosperity and Peace Movement	36,371	0.19%	No
