= 1926 Polish presidential elections =

- May election
← 1922	31 May 1926	June 1926 →
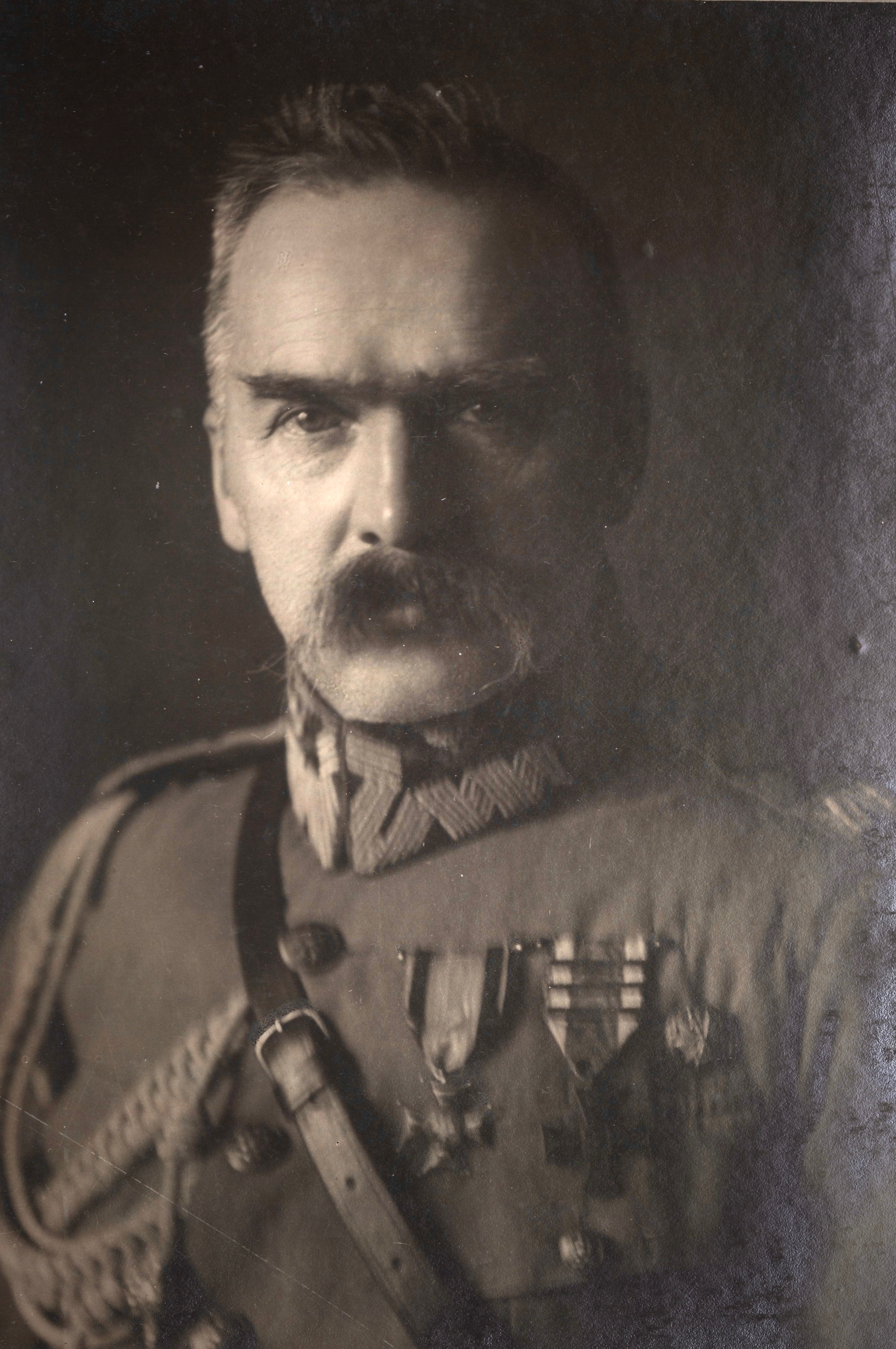

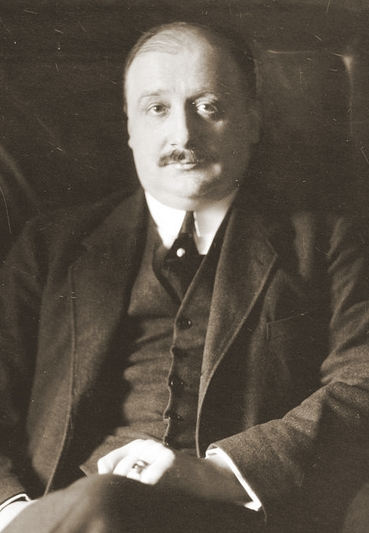
Nominee	Józef Piłsudski	Adolf Bniński
Party	Independent	National Democracy
Electoral vote	292	193
Percentage	60.21%	39.79%
President before election
Stanisław Wojciechowski
PSL
Elected President
Maciej Rataj (acting)
PSL
- June election
← May 1926	1 June 1926	1933 →
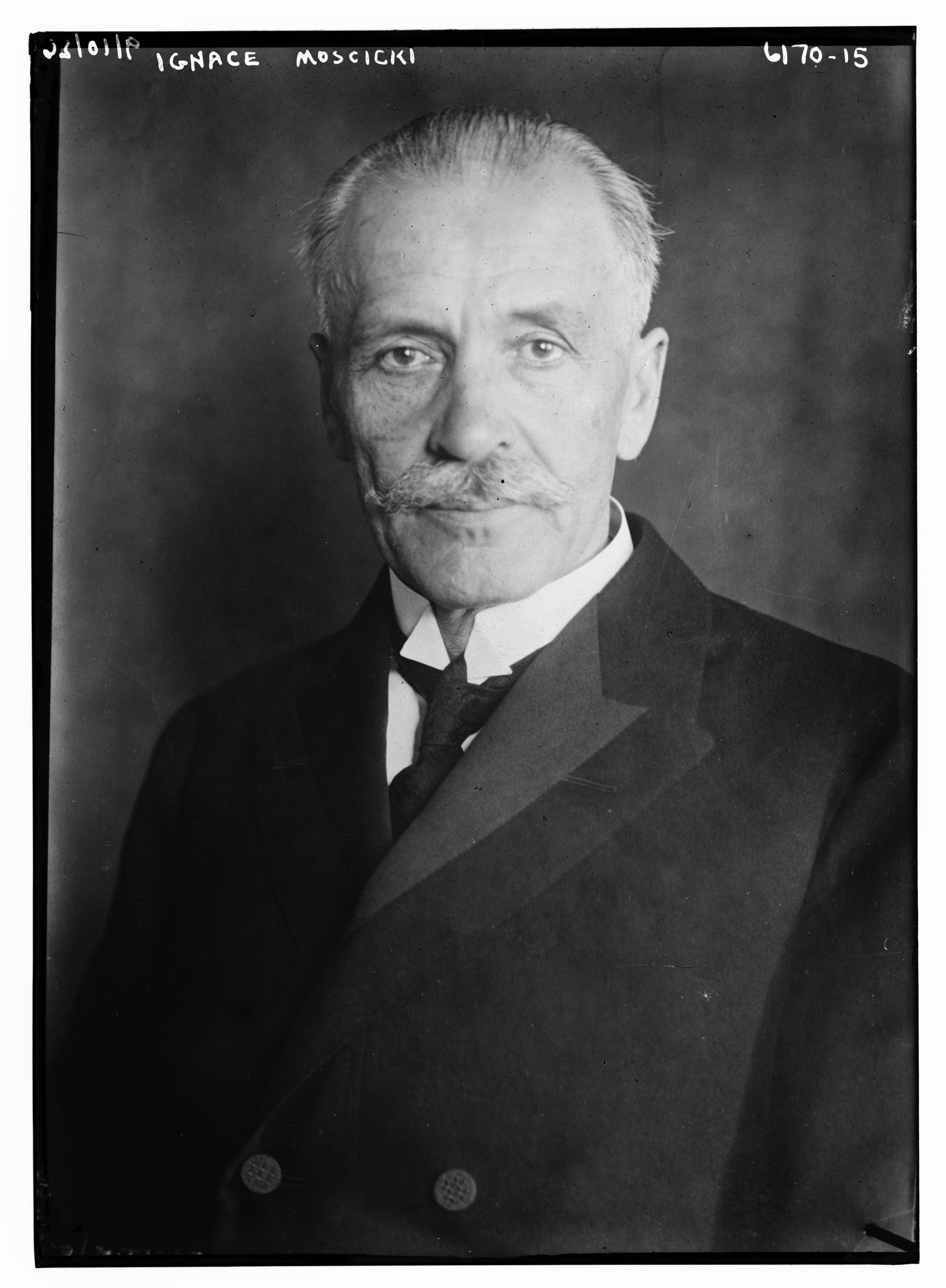

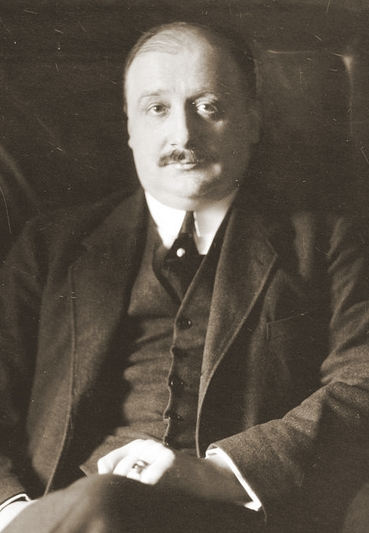
Nominee	Ignacy Mościcki	Adolf Bniński
Party	Independent	National Democracy
Electoral vote	281	200
Percentage	58.30%	41.49%
President before election
Maciej Rataj (acting)
PSL
Elected President
Ignacy Mościcki
Independent

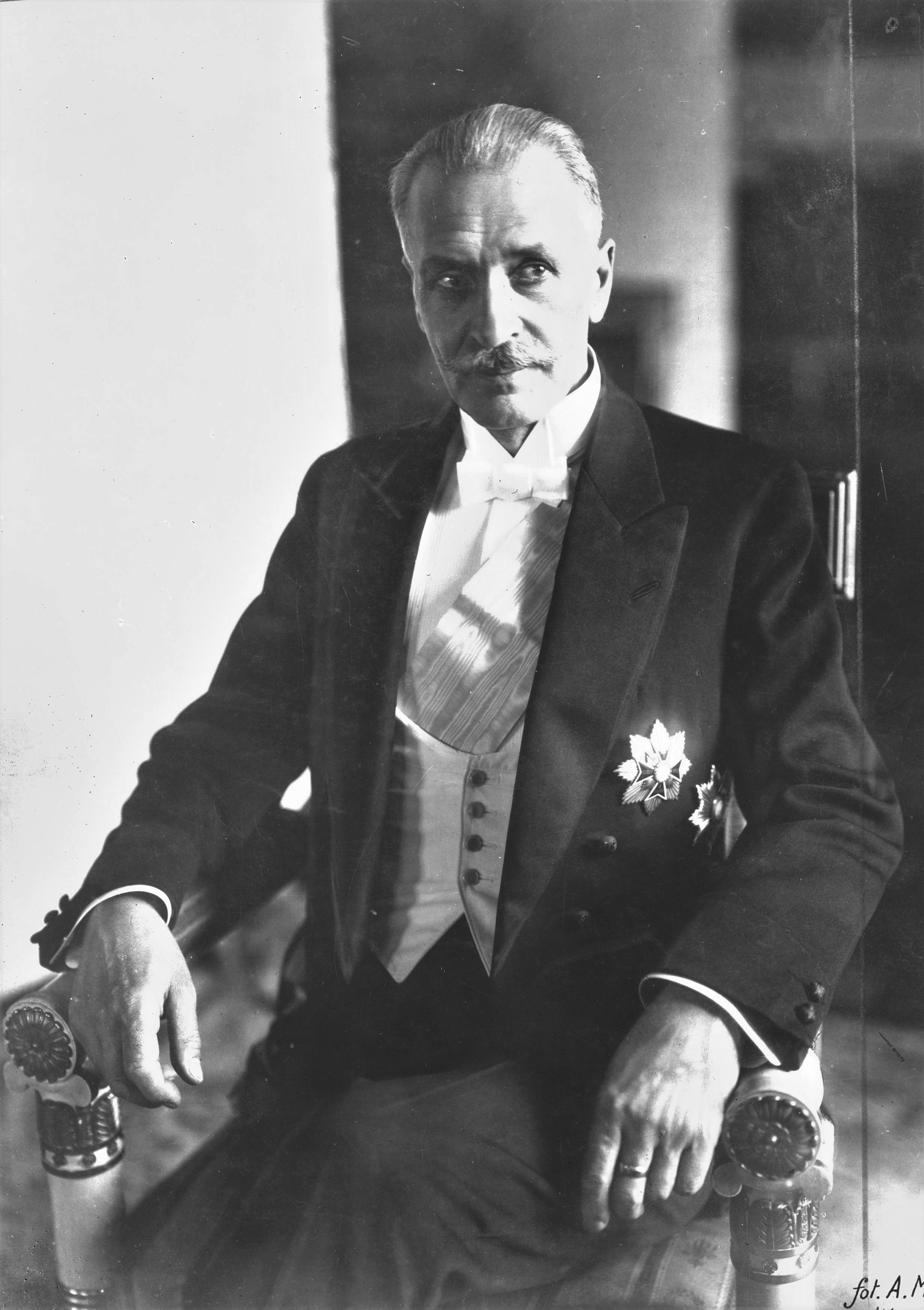
Professor Ignacy Mościcki was elected (and accepted) in place of Piłsudski

Two presidential elections were held in Poland in 1926. They followed the May Coup, which forced President Stanisław Wojciechowski and Prime Minister Wincenty Witos to resign and gave effective power to coup leader, Marshal Józef Piłsudski.

According to then Constitution President was elected by joint houses of Sejm and Senate (National Assembly).

== 31 May ==
There were two candidates: Piłsudski and supported by the National Democracy, Christian Democracy and Piast Adolf Bniński, Voivode of Poznań. Several other politicians were mentioned to run, most notably ousted President Wojciechowski, Sejm Marshal and now Acting President Maciej Rataj (Polish People's Party "Piast") and Senate Marshal Wojciech Trąmpczyński (National Democracy), but they declined to run.

Piłsudski was endorsed by left-wing groups and Biński was endorsed by National Democracy.

Piłsudski defeated Biński in a single round:

Candidate	Votes	%
Józef Piłsudski	292	60.21
Adolf Bniński	193	39.79
Total	485	100.00

However, following his election, Piłsudski refused to accept the presidency.

== 1 June ==
=== Pro-Piłsudskiite candidate selection ===
Pro-Piłsudskiite camp

Ignacy Mościcki
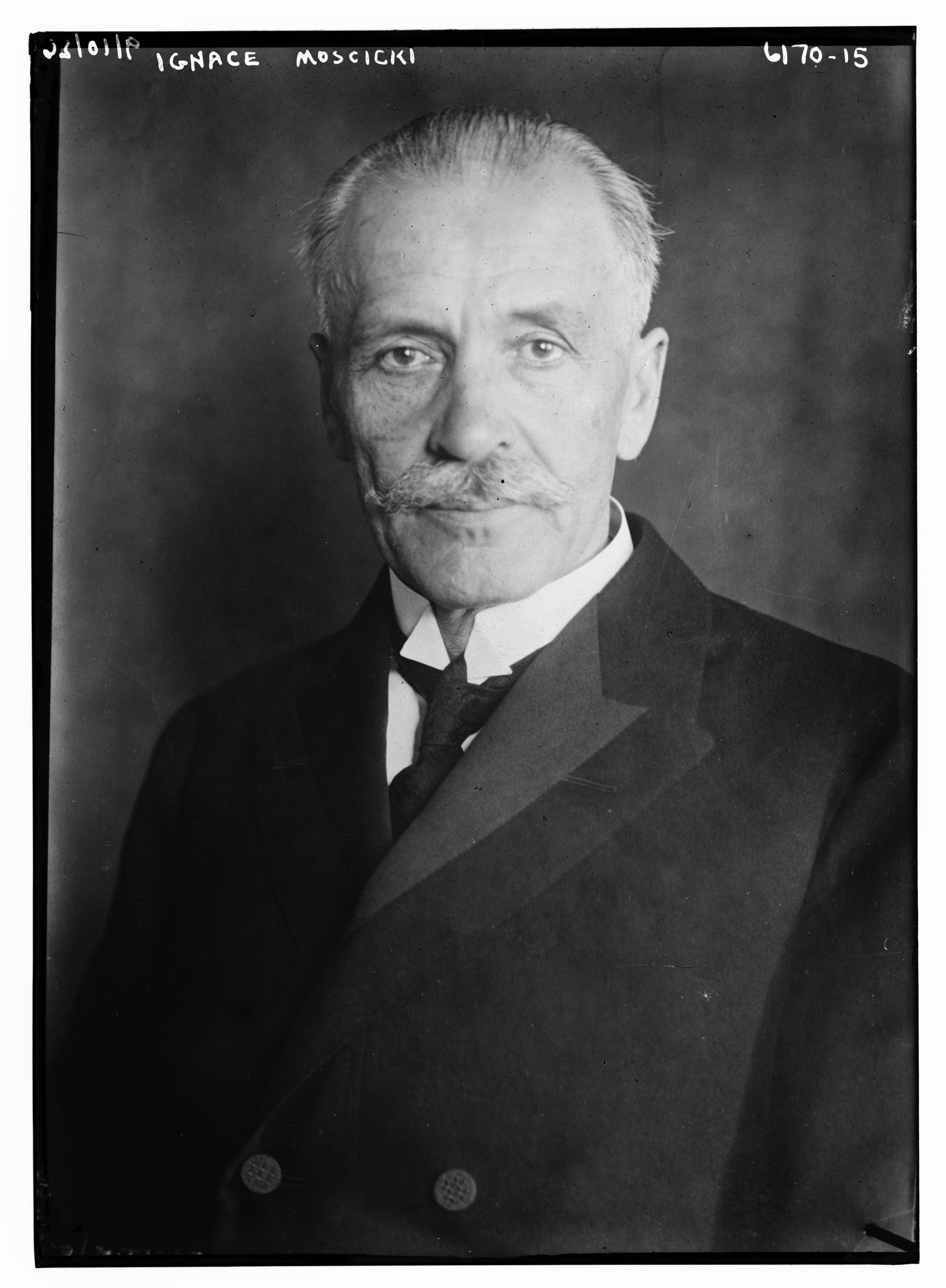
Chemist

Potential candidates
Ignacy Mościcki	Artur Śliwiński	Zdzisław Lubomirski	Marian Zdziechowski
Chemist	Prime Minister of Poland (1922)	Mayor of Warsaw (1916-1917)	Philosopher

Following Piłsudski's refusal to accept the mantle of the presidency, four candidates were considered to replace him: Artur Śliwiński, Zdzisław Lubomirski, Ignacy Mościcki and Marian Zdziechowski. Śliwiński was a former Prime Minister, who failed to form a government with confidence of the Sejm, by 1926 he had become the director of the City Theater in Warsaw. Lubomirski and Zdziechowski, the most serious rivals to Mościcki, belonged to the "old conservative" movement. Lubomirski was a former Mayor of Warsaw and leader of the Regency Council in the Regency Kingdom of Poland, while Zdziechowski was a famous professor and political thinker. The possibility of their candidacies was eclipsed by Mościcki due to the initiative of incumbent Prime Minister Kazimierz Bartel. Mościcki was rather inexperienced in politics, as he was primarily a professional chemist. His political experience was limited to being a rank and file member in the illegal Polish socialist movement during the 19th century in the Russian partition, so he was assumed to be mostly a loyalist to Piłsudski.

=== Election ===
The Polish Socialist Party, who had previously supported Piłsudski, filed their candidate - Sejm Caucus Chair Zygmunt Marek, a man who had officially nominated Piłsudski a day earlier. Bniński ran again.

Candidate	First round		Second round	
Candidate	Votes	%	Votes	%
Ignacy Mościcki	215	44.61	281	58.30
Adolf Bniński	211	43.78	200	41.49
Zygmunt Marek	56	11.62	1	0.21
Total	482	100.00	482	100.00

Mościcki accepted his election.
