= 1933 Polish presidential election =

← 1926	8 May 1933	1947 →
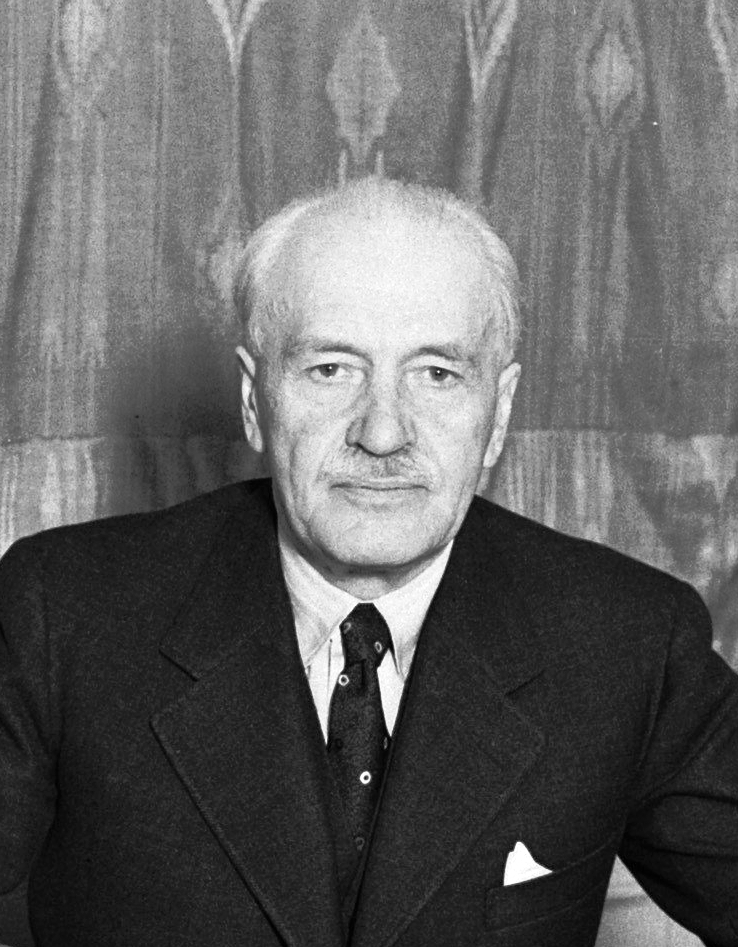
Nominee	Ignacy Mościcki
Party	Independent
Electoral vote	332
Percentage	100%
Nominators	BBWR
President before election
Ignacy Mościcki
Independent
Elected President
Ignacy Mościcki
Independent

Presidential elections were held in Poland on May 8, 1933. Professor Ignacy Mościcki was re-elected for a second seven-year term, having previously been elected to the position in 1926. He was elected by 332 votes, with 11 votes appearing to be void. The result was greeted with loud cheers.

He was elected by the Polish Sejm (Diet) and Senate sitting together as the National Assembly. The National Assembly had 555 members but only 343 were present, mainly members of BBWR, the government party of Marshal Józef Piłsudski. The main opposition party, SN, stayed away, but representatives of German minority and Jewish parties plus three smaller parties (including the Communists who tried to nominate their own candidate but did not have the necessary 50 votes to nominate) were present.

== Results ==
Candidate	Party	Votes	%
Ignacy Mościcki	BBWR	332	100.00
Total		332	100.00
Valid votes		332	96.79
Invalid/blank votes		11	3.21
Total votes		343	100.00
Registered voters/turnout		555	61.80
