= Adolf Bniński =

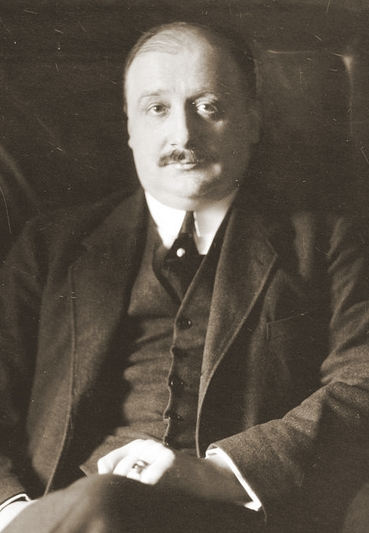
Count Adolf Bniński

Count Adolf Bniński (21 August 1884 – 8 July 1942) was a Polish agricultural, conservative and royalist activist. He was Voivode of Poznań from 1923 to 1928 and a member of the Senate of Poland in the Second Polish Republic. In the aftermath of the German invasion of Poland he was the Government Delegate for Poland for the Polish territories annexed by Nazi Germany. The Germans arrested him in July 1941, and he was killed in 1942.

== Biography ==
Count Adolf Bniński was born on 21 August 1884 in Kosowo. He studied agriculture at the Jagiellonian University, as well as at the German universities in Munich and Halle. He inherited significant agricultural lands, and he was a notable agricultural activist in Greater Poland.

In 1918, he became a functionary of the reborn Polish state, first as a commissar for the Łódź region in 1918, then from 1919 to 1920 as a starost of the Środa County and from 1923 to 1928 he was the voivode of Poznań.

In the political arena, Bniński supported conservative and pro-monarchy views. In the Polish presidential election of 1926, he was the presidential candidate of the Popular National Union (Związek Ludowo-Narodowy), but he lost to Ignacy Mościcki. In 1935, despite his opposition to the sanacja regime, he joined the senate of Poland, and was a senator until 1938.

After the German invasion of Poland he joined the Polish Underground State. In July 1940 he was chosen to be the Government Delegate for Poland for the Polish territories annexed by Nazi Germany although he did not receive the official nomination from general Władysław Sikorski until December 3. Bniński was arrested by then Germans in July 1941, for refusing to express support for a joint Polish-German anti-Soviet declaration. He was imprisoned in Poznań and tortured and executed on the nights of 7 to 8 July 1942. The exact circumstances of the disposal of his body are unknown; according to Zbigniew Mieczkowski he could have even been fed to wild animals (lions).

It was not until 10 October 1942 that Nazi Germany's Foreign Ministry retroactively issued a death penalty for Bniński.

His position as Delegate was taken by Leon Mikołajczyk.

In 1995 he was posthumously awarded the Order of the White Eagle.
