= Marek Wojtkowski =

Polish politician (born 1968)

Marek Wojtkowski (born 26 February 1968) is a Polish politician. He served two terms as a member of the Sejm from 2007 to 2014. He left parliament to take office as mayor of Włocławek.

== Career ==
Wojtkowski was born in Lubraniec on 26 February 1968. He graduated from the Faculty of Humanities of the Kazimierz Wielki University in Bydgoszcz in 1994 with a master's degree in history. In 2002, Wojtkowski completed a doctorate in history at Nicolaus Copernicus University in Toruń under the direction of Mirosław Krajewski.

Wojtkowski won 5,353 votes in the 2007 Polish parliamentary election, and was elected to the Sejm as a Civic Platform candidate representing Toruń. He won reelection in 2011, securing 7,352 votes. Wojtkowski defeated Andrzej Pałucki in the 2014 Polish local elections, and took office as mayor of Włocławek. He faced Jarosławem Chmielewskim in the 2018 Polish local elections, and retained the mayoralty for a second term.
