= 1947 Polish presidential election =

- 5 February 1947

Needed to win: Two-thirds of valid votes 433 valid voters in the National Assembly 289 votes needed to win
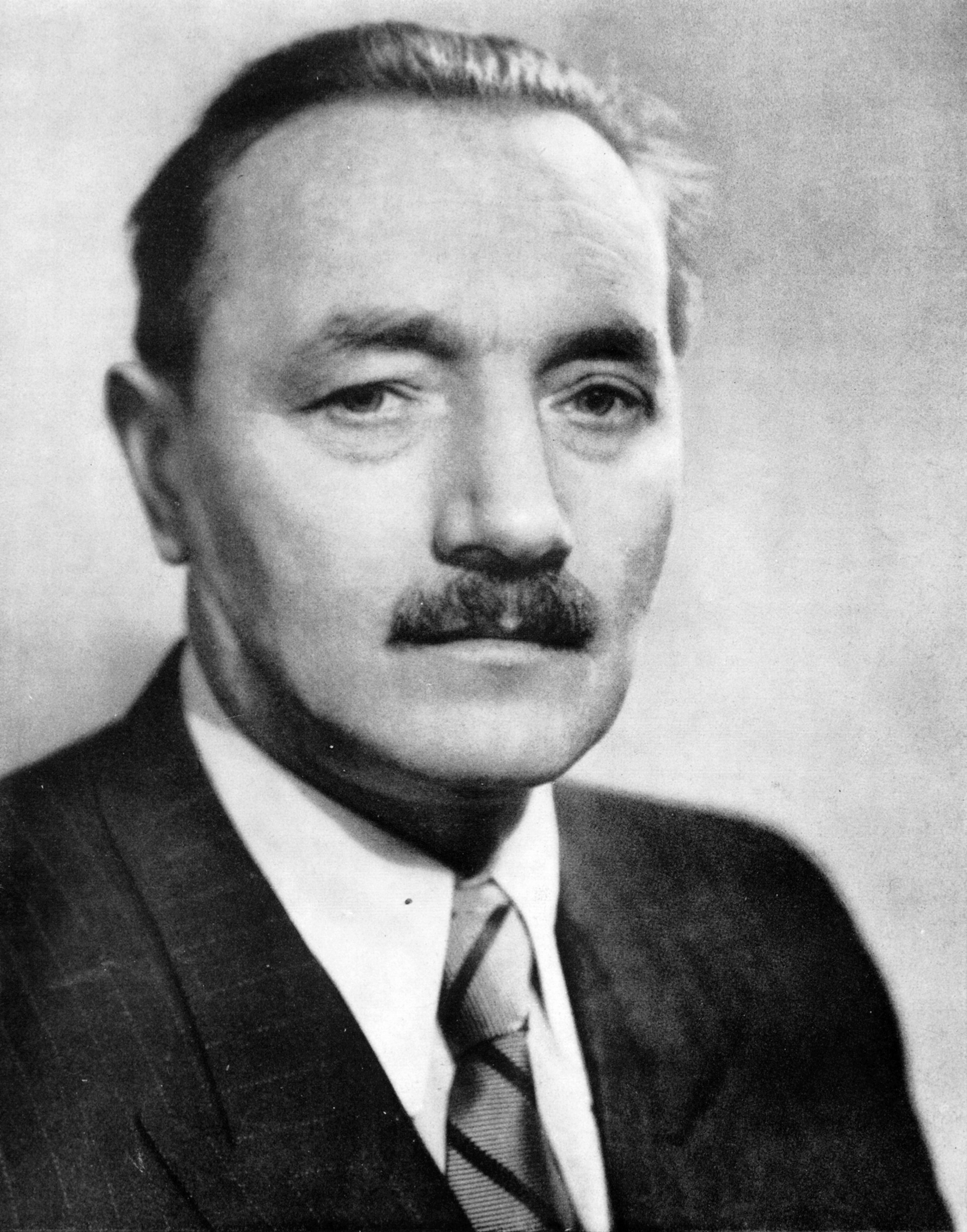

Nominee	Bolesław Bierut	Against
Party	BD
Electoral vote	419	24
Percentage	94.44%	5.56%
Nominators	BD, SP, PSL "NW"
Elected President
Bolesław Bierut
BD

Presidential elections were held in Poland on February 5th 1947, the last presidential elections until 1989. The president had to be elected by the newly formed Legislative Sejm among presented candidates. However, the only standing figure was Bolesław Bierut. Bierut received 408 votes, with the opposition Polish People's Party voting against by casting blank (24) or invalid (1) votes.

== Results ==
Candidate	Party	Votes	%
Bolesław Bierut	BD–SP–PSL "NW"	408	94.44
Against		24	5.56
Total		432	100.00
Valid votes		432	99.77
Invalid votes		1	0.23
Total votes		433	100.00
Registered voters/turnout		444	97.52
Source: Kronika XX wieku
