= Adrian Zandberg =

Polish historian, computer programmer and politician

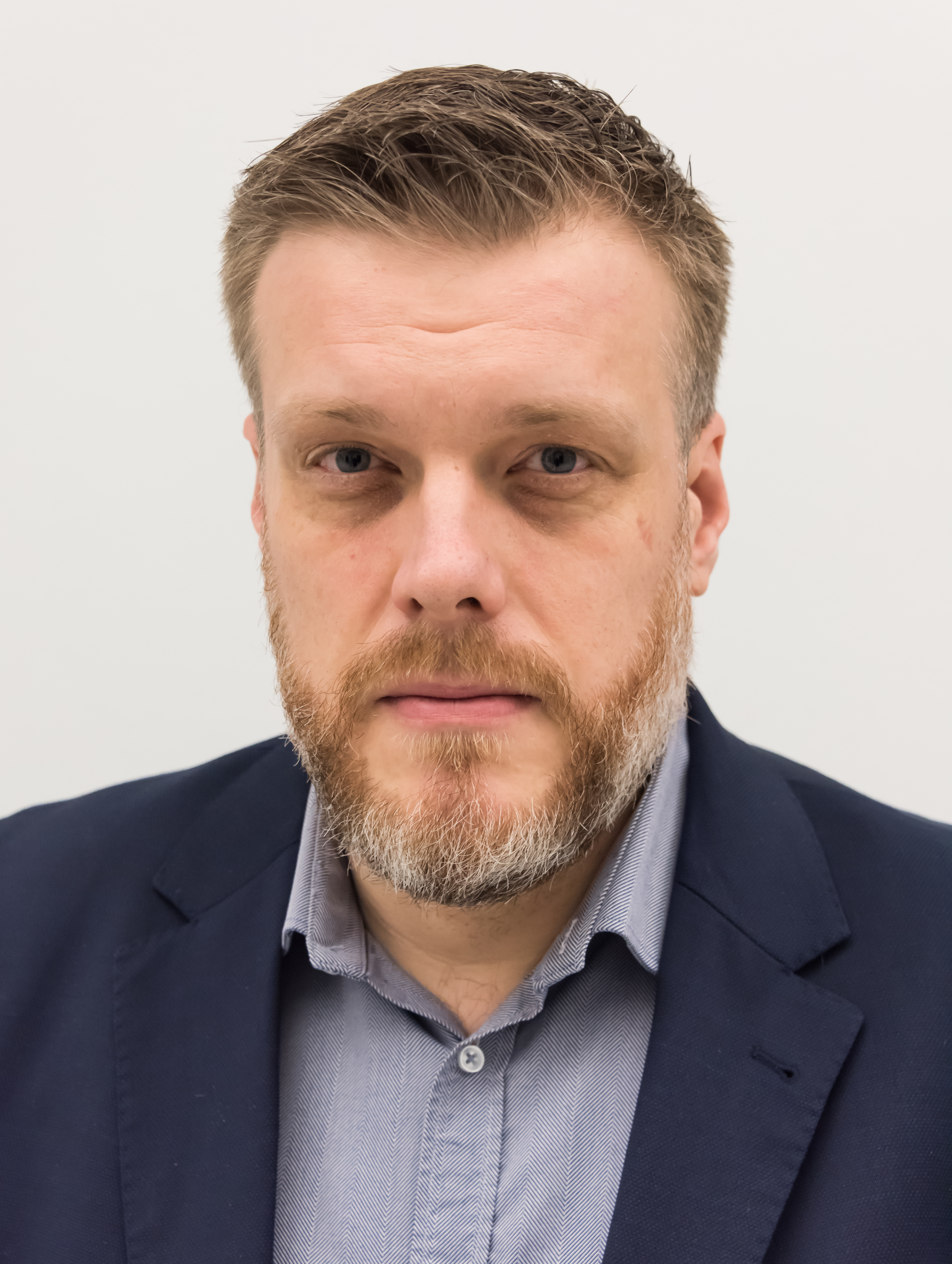
- Zandberg in 2020

Co-leader of Partia Razem
- Incumbent
- Assumed office 27 November 2022 Serving with Aleksandra Owca (Note: Previously from 27 November 2022 to 24 October 2024 served along Magdalena Biejat. Since 3 December 2024 the other co-leader has been Aleksandra Owca.)
- Preceded by: Collective leadership

Member of the Sejm
- Incumbent
- Assumed office 12 November 2019
- Constituency: No.19 (Warsaw I)

Personal details
- Born: Adrian Tadeusz Zandberg; 4 December 1979 (age 46) Aalborg, Denmark
- Citizenship: Poland; Denmark
- Party: Partia Razem (since 2015)
- Other political affiliations: Labour Union (1997-2005); Social Alliance (1998); Union of the Left (2005); Young Socialists (2005–2015); Polish Socialist Party (2009-2010); The Left (2019–2024)
- Education: University of Warsaw (Dr)
- Website: Campaign website

Adrian Tadeusz Zandberg (Polish: [ˈadrjan ˈtadɛuʂ ˈzandbɛrk]; born 4 December 1979) is a Polish left-wing politician, computer programmer, and doctor of history, who has served as member of the Sejm since 2019. He is a founding member and co-leader of Partia Razem. He was the party's candidate in the 2025 Polish presidential election.

== Biography ==
=== Early life ===
Zandberg was born on 4 December 1979 in Aalborg, Denmark, where his parents emigrated from Poland at the turn of 1960s and 1970s. In the 1980s the family returned to Poland and settled in the Mokotów district of Warsaw.

=== Education and work ===
Zandberg graduated from private high school in Warsaw in 1997. He then studied law and history at the University of Warsaw, of which he completed only history graduating with master's degree in 2002. In 2007, he obtained a doctorate in history with his thesis Social Democracy and Social Movements in Germany and United Kingdom before 1914, written under supervision of Anna Żarnowska.

Zandberg is a self-taught computer programmer. In the 1980s, he learned the BASIC programming language using the ZX Spectrum computer. Since university he took up programming jobs, later establishing an individual entrepreneurship.

He worked as an academic teacher at the Faculty of Japanese Culture of the Polish-Japanese Academy of Information Technology between 2007 and 2017, and at the Higher School of Communication, Political Science and International Relations in Warsaw between 2007 and 2014.

=== Political activity ===
As a teenager, Zandberg contributed to the Marxist Internet Archive. In 2001, he published an article in the Gazeta Wyborcza daily newspaper written together with civil rights activist Jacek Kuroń on the topic of social justice in Poland. He was elected chairman of the youth wing (Forum Młodych) of the Labour United party (Unia Pracy), was a member of the executive of this party and founded the Federation of Young Socialists (Młodzi Socjaliści).

==== Partia Razem ====
Zandberg describes himself as a socialist and democratic socialist. In May 2015, he became one of the founders of a political party Partia Razem, and was elected to the nine-member Board, together with Jakub Baran, Aleksandra Cacha, Alicja Czubek, Maciej Konieczny, Magdalena Malińska, Mateusz Mirys, Katarzyna Paprota, and Marcelina Zawisza.

Zandberg was placed on the first place on Razem's Warsaw candidate list of the Sejm elections in October 2015. As a Razem's representative during a television debate before the 2015 parliamentary elections, held in Poland on 25 October he represented the smallest of the eight parties. Among other positions, he was the only one of the eight panelists who pleaded for an unconditional acceptance of Syrian war refugees in Poland. Following the debate, some of the media declared him the winner of this discussion, and his appearance at the debate generated more media interest in him and his party in the following days. Zandberg received personally 49,711 votes, but his party won only 3.62 percent of votes, so did not gain any seats in the Sejm.

While some commentators claimed that the increase in popularity of Razem was at the expense of the United Left coalition (among others consisting of the Democratic Left Alliance, Your Movement, Polish Socialist Party and The Greens), which also did not win any seats, resulting in neither left-wing party being represented in the new parliament, others, including United Left leader Barbara Nowacka, disagreed with that assessment, pointing out that Razem attracted mostly new voters, and few of its supporters had voted for the SLD or Your Movement in previous elections and that the decrease in popularity of United Left's member parties had been a steady process over the years, due to past errors.

Zandberg was subsequently elected a member of the Sejm at the 2019 parliamentary election. In the election, Razem joined with the Democratic Left Alliance and Spring to form a broad progressive alliance known as The Left, as part of which Zandberg was one of 49 members elected.

In 2022, he became one of the co-leaders of Razem. In 2024, he was elected as co-leader again.

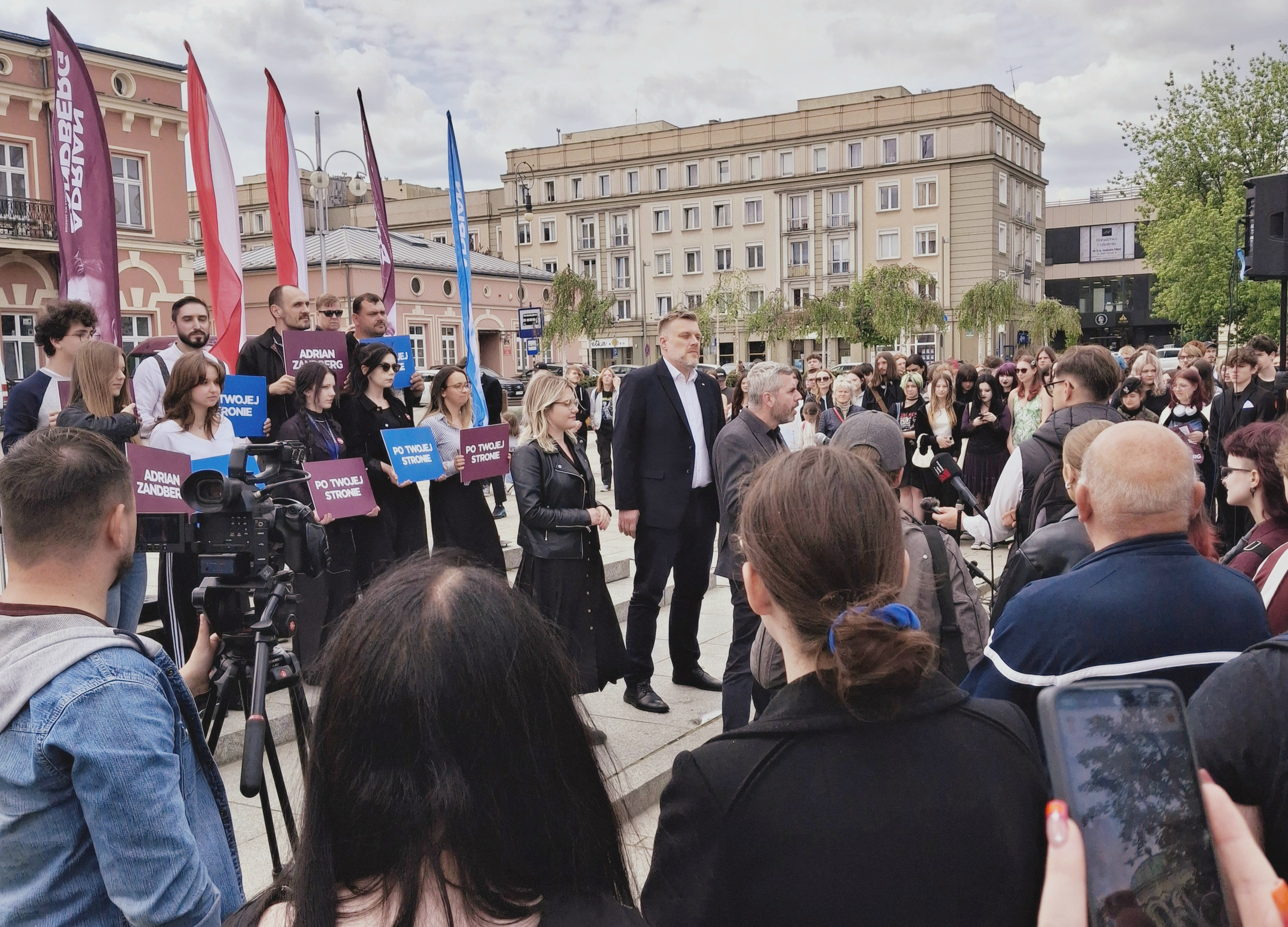
Adrian Zandberg at a rally in Częstochowa, 2025

On 11 January 2025, Zandberg was announced as Razem's candidate in the 2025 presidential election. In the first round held on 18 May 2025, he obtained 4.86% of the vote, placing sixth in the race. He received the most votes among the left-wing candidates, ranking above Magdalena Biejat (4.23%) and Joanna Senyszyn (1.09%). Zandberg declined to publicly endorse any of the candidates in the run-off.

== Personal life ==
In late 1990s, Zandberg was in a relationship with Barbara Nowacka for three years, when they were both members of the Youth Federation of Labour Union.

Zandberg is married to Barbara Audycka-Zandberg and they have two children. Audycka-Zandberg holds a doctorate in social sciences specialising in housing issues and works as an assistant professor at the Institute of Applied Social Sciences of the University of Warsaw. She ran for the district council of Mokotów in 2018 without success.

== Electoral history ==
=== Sejm ===
| Election | Electoral list | Constituency | Votes received | | | Result | Ref |
| Election | Electoral list | Constituency | Total | % | +/− | Result | Ref |
|---|---|---|---|---|---|---|---|
| 2015 | Partia Razem | No. 19 (Warsaw I) | 49,711 | 4.54 | — | Not elected | |
| 2019 | Democratic Left Alliance (Note: The officially registered party list also included other members of The Left coalition.) | No. 19 (Warsaw I) | 140,898 | 10.20 | +5.66 | Elected | |
| 2023 | New Left | No. 19 (Warsaw I) | 64,435 | 3.76 | −6.44 | Elected | |

=== European Parliament ===
| Election | Electoral list | Constituency | Votes received | | | Result | Ref |
| Election | Electoral list | Constituency | Total | % | +/− | Result | Ref |
|---|---|---|---|---|---|---|---|
| 2019 | Lewica Razem | No. 4 (Warsaw) | 17,108 | 1.23 | — | Not elected | |

=== Presidential ===
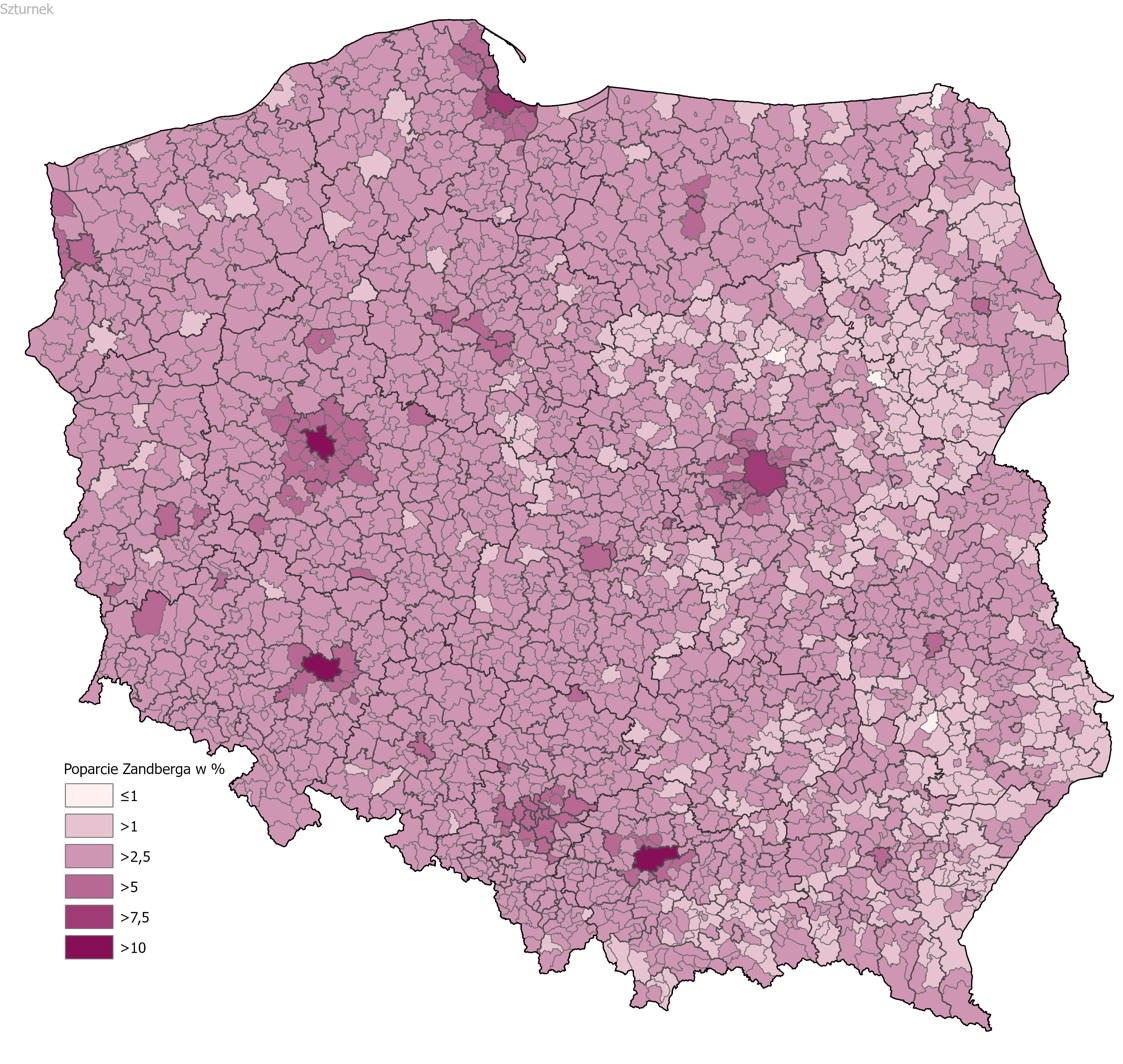
2025 Zandberg's result by municipality

| Election | Affiliation | First round | | | Second round | | | Ref |
| Election | Affiliation | Total | % | Position | Total | % | Position | Ref |
|---|---|---|---|---|---|---|---|---|
| 2025 | Partia Razem | 952,832 | 4.86 | #6 | Did not advance | | | |
