= Young Socialists (Poland) =

Polish political organisation

Young Socialists Młodzi Socjaliści
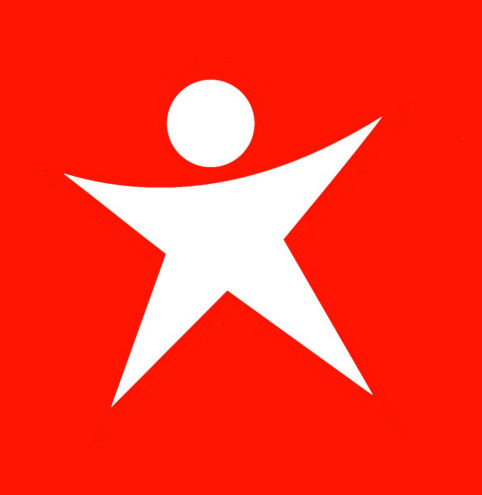
- Founded: 2005; 21 years ago
- Split from: Labour Union Youth Federation
- Dissolved: October 1, 2015; 10 years ago
- Merged into: Razem (de facto)
- Headquarters: Łódź, Poland
- Membership: 150-400
- Ideology: Democratic socialism Anti-capitalism
- Colours: Red
- International affiliation: PEL (observer); ENDYL
- Website: www.mlodzisocjalisci.pl

The Young Socialists (Młodzi Socjaliści [ˈmwɔd͡ʑi sɔt͡sjaˈliɕt͡ɕi]) was a Polish left-wing political organization existing between 2005 and 2015. Its goal was to promote socialist values, social equality, economic justice and participatory democracy. The group was a response of the young generation of activists to the lack of representation of the radical left in Polish politics.

== History ==
The organization was brought to life by a group of activists hailing from the Labour Union Youth Federation - the youth wing of Labour Union. Initiators of the founding were, among others Adrian Zandberg and Barbara Nowacka. Founders of the organization emphasized the need for greater ideological and organizational independence, pointing out, that the traditional formula of party youth organizations did not meet their expectations. Young Socialists functioned as an independent association, with no formal ties to a political party.

In its first years the organization focused on participation in protests and social campaigns. Young Socialists engaged among others in demonstrations against wars in the Middle East, the construction of anti-ballistic shield in Poland, presence of religion in schools and the educational policy of minister Roman Giertych. They also maintained international contacts, mainly with the youth organizations of parties affiliated with the GUE/NGL group in the European Parliament.

Between 2008 and 2010 efforts to transform Young Socialists into a political party were made. The organization engaged in talks with the Polish Socialist Party and the political circles associated with Ryszard Bugaj. In 2009 it managed to register an electoral list for the European Parliament election, however further attempts at institutionalization failed.

At the same time Young Socialists carried out intense educational and formative activities. They organized courses, seminars, summer and winter camps, the goal of which was to prepare young activists for social and political activity. People aged from their teens to their thirties were involved in the association's activities, differing in their level of knowledge and experience.

Many views and currents were present in the organization, which led to many disputes over the direction of activity - some members supported the creation of a political party, others preferred remaining as a formative association. Memoirs of former members of the organization also include accounts of personal conflicts and internal tensions, which influenced the association's stability.

In 2015 many former members of Young Socialists participated in the creation of a new political party - Razem. Adrian Zandberg, Maciej Konieczny, Marcelina Zawisza, Justyna Samolińska and Mateusz Mirys, among others were co-founders and leaders of the new party. In the same year Young Socialists officially ceased activities.

== Ideology and goals ==
Young Socialists represented an ideology similar to democratic socialism, at the same time their policies were often situated left of the social democratic current. The organization's program included, among others a demand of withdrawal from NATO.

According to its ideological declaration the organization supported:

- economic justice,
- a welfare state,
- workers' rights and trade unions,
- a secular state,
- gender equality,
- fighting discrimination based on race, ethnicity and sexuality,
- participatory democracy and a larger participation of citizens in decision-making

Young Socialists drew on the tradition of democratic socialism and anti-capitalism, being inspired, among others by western European left-wing movements.

== Activity ==
The organization engaged in educational, journalistic and street activity. It organized demonstrations, happenings, debates, workshops, trips and social campaigns. It was also active in student and worker circles.

Young Socialists participated in protests against social cuts, privatization of public services and catholic church's interference with public life. They cooperated with other left-wing organizations domestically and abroad, including European socialist youth movements.

Young Socialists' activity was supported, among others by the Rosa Luxemburg Foundation - an institution associated with German Die Linke.

Young Socialists had an observer status in the Party of the European Left.

== See also ==
- Partia Razem
- Adrian Zandberg
