= Partia Razem =

Left-wing political party in Poland

Together Party Partia Razem
- Abbreviation: Razem
- Spokesperson: Mateusz Merta
- Co-leaders: Aleksandra Owca; Adrian Zandberg
- Parliamentary leader: Marcelina Zawisza
- Founded: 16 May 2015
- Registered: 21 May 2015
- Split from: Young Socialists; The Greens
- Headquarters: Nowy Świat 27, Warsaw
- Youth wing: Młodzi Razem
- Membership (2025): ▲6,915
- Ideology: Social democracy; Democratic socialism; Pro-Europeanism
- Political position: Centre-left to left-wing
- National affiliation: The Left (2019–2024); Senate Pact 2023 (Note: For 2023 Senate election)
- European affiliation: European Left Alliance for the People and the Planet
- International affiliation: Progressive International (2020–2022)
- European political alliance: Central-Eastern European Green Left Alliance; Democracy in Europe Movement 2025 (2016–2022)
- Colours: Alizarin carmine
- Slogan: "Inna polityka jest możliwa" - Another politics is possible "Razem budujemy inną Polskę" - Together We are building a different Poland
- Sejm: 4 / 460 (0.9%)
- Senate: 0 / 100 (0%)
- European Parliament: 0 / 53 (0%)
- Regional assemblies: 0 / 552 (0%)

Party flag
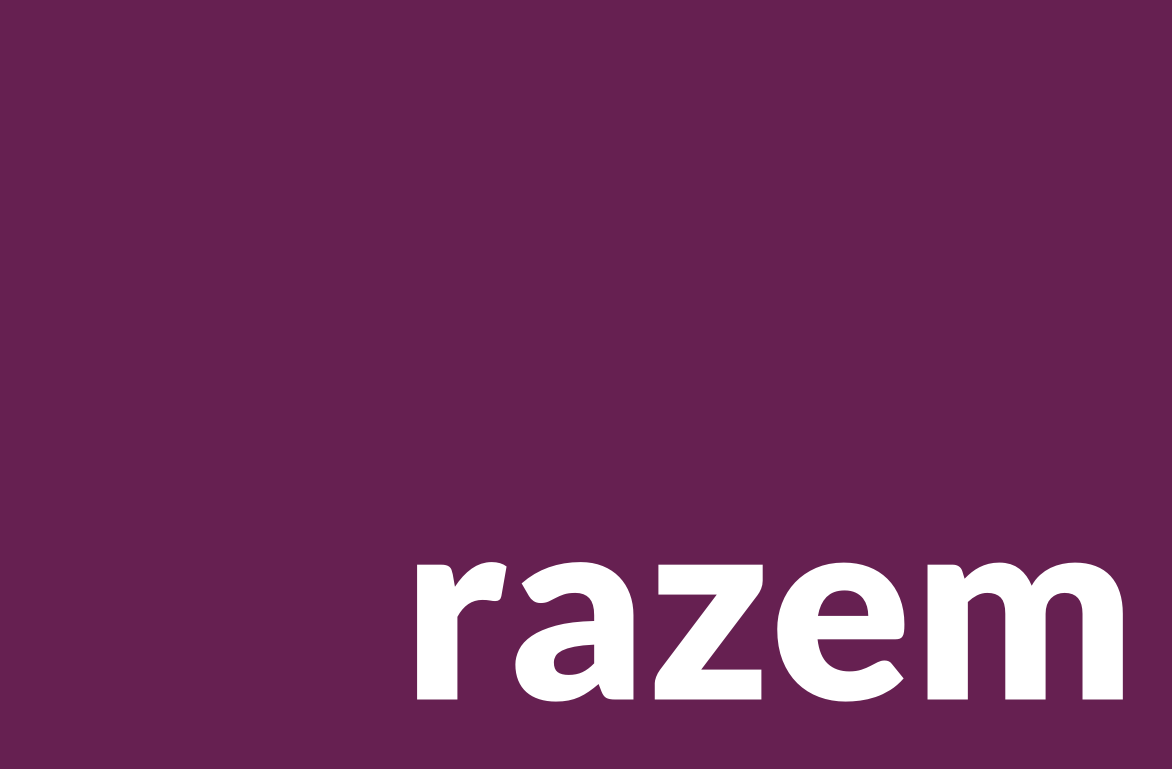

Website
- partiarazem.pl
- Politics of Poland; Political parties; Elections; A: The party has also been described as far-left.

Partia Razem (Polish pronunciation: [ˈpar.tja ˈra.zɛm], meaning 'Together Party') (Note: Also referred to simply as Razem ('Together'), which is the party's official short name.) is a left-wing political party in Poland. It was founded in 2015, and from 2019 to 2024 the party's official name was Lewica Razem ([lɛˈvi.t͡sa ˈra.zɛm], 'Left Together').

The party was one of the eight nationwide committees standing in the 2015 parliamentary election. Party co-leaders are Adrian Zandberg and Aleksandra Owca, elected at the end of November and beginning of December 2024, following a split in the party in October. It supports principles of social democracy, democratic socialism, and social liberalism, and has expressed progressive views. The party is critical of the historical post-communist Democratic Left Alliance. It is part of the European Left Alliance for the People and the Planet, a European political party that supports an alternative to capitalism. It was a member of the Progressive International and DiEM25.

== History ==
=== Foundation ===
Razem was founded as a response to the unsuccessful attempt to create a left-wing political platform in Poland during the 2015 presidential election. Another reason was dissatisfaction with the role of the post-communist Democratic Left Alliance as the main centre-left party. Many founders were previously activists in the Young Socialists, The Greens or local initiatives, including Kraków Against Games.

Razem's main political stances were formulated during the founding congress on 16–17 May 2015, when Razem's first National Board was elected, consisting of Jakub Baran, Aleksandra Cacha, Alicja Czubek, Maciej Konieczny, Magdalena Malińska, Mateusz Mirys, Katarzyna Paprota, Adrian Zandberg, and Marcelina Zawisza. However, several local structures were active even earlier, in March and April. The party was officially registered on 21 July 2015.

Razem registered lists for the 2015 parliamentary election in all electoral districts and received 3.6% of the vote in the election, below the 5% threshold to gain seats in parliament. However, having met the 3% threshold, the party received state subsidies for their election campaign.

=== First years ===
In 2016, Razem instigated mass protests (called the Black Protest) against a bill that would impose a complete ban on abortion, proposed by a citizens' initiative. In 2016, Foreign Policy magazine included Agnieszka Dziemianowicz-Bąk of the Razem National Board, together with Barbara Nowacka of Polish Initiative (Inicjatywa Polska), in its annual list of the 100 most influential global thinkers for their role in organising the protest. In 2018, Forbes magazine included Marcelina Zawisza on its annual European Forbes 30 Under 30 list in the "Law & Policy" category for her role as a co-founder of Razem and one of the organisers of "black protest".

In 2016, Razem began cooperating with the Democracy in Europe Movement 2025 (DiEM25) pan-European movement, founded by Yanis Varoufakis. In May 2017, Varoufakis expressed DiEM25's support for Razem in the 2019 European Parliament election.

On 6 July 2017, Razem organised a protest against Donald Trump's visit to Poland. Protesters were dressed as handmaids from Margaret Atwood's The Handmaid's Tale, as a symbol of the stripping down of women's rights both in Poland and the United States.

In September 2017, Razem activists filed a complaint with the National Electoral Commission on behalf of the party, alleging that the Alliance of European Conservatives and Reformists had helped to fund a Law and Justice conference during the 2015 parliamentary election campaign in violation of European Parliament rules as well as Polish electoral law. On 29 October, the commission announced that it would investigate the complaint.

In 2018, the party was subjected to an investigation by the prosecutor's office for allegedly promoting communism, which goes against the Polish constitution. Party co-leader Adrian Zandberg accused the government of initiating the investigation as retaliation for the party's criticism and repudiated any links between Razem and totalitarianism.

=== 2019 election ===
In early 2019, in the run-up to the European Parliament election Razem Party rejected a proposal of an alignment with Robert Biedroń's Spring. On 28 February, party leaders officially announced formation of the electoral coalition with Labour Union and Social Justice Movement under the name of Lewica Razem. The coalition received 1.24% of overall votes, and thus did not pass the 5% threshold and did not win any seats.

For the 2019 parliamentary election, Razem formed a coalition with the Democratic Left Alliance and Wiosna, known as The Left. The move had been a topic of intense debate due to Razem being founded in opposition to the Democratic Left Alliance. Many activists left due to the decision and the faction Socialist Action split to become an independent organisation. In the election Razem won six seats in the Sejm. Soon after the election results were announced, the National Board voted to oblige the six elected MPs to donate all income surpassing triple the minimum wage to charity; universally lowering politicians' pay to this threshold was one of the early postulates. Since the electoral list was formally registered to SLD, Razem's candidates could not receive funding from their own party. Instead, they made personal donations after having withdrawn "appreciation bonus" from the party's budget. The situation caused uproar and was met with opposition within Razem.

During 2021 and 2022, the party released a podcast. Episodes consisted of interviews, discussions, solo talks, and speeches recorded during the parliamentary sessions. Outside of this, Razem is active on other social media.

In 2022, Razem ended cooperation with DiEM25 and Progressive International, criticising their, "lack of unequivocal declaration of recognition of Ukraine's sovereignty and the absolute condemnation of Russian imperialism" during the 2022 Russian invasion of Ukraine.

=== 2023 election and after ===
In the 2023 election, the party continued its engagement in The Left with other centre-left and left-wing parties. The coalition received the nationwide electoral list number 3. Seven members of Razem were elected to Sejm and two successfully ran for Senate seats, with the Senate Pact endorsement. According to Dan Davison, "Razem’s focus on optics and appearing “united” made it reluctant to criticize its partners in Lewica", including abstaining from criticizing the right-wing shift on immigration during the 2023 campaign.

Razem had intended to enter government as part of The Left coalition together with Donald Tusk's Civic Coalition and Third Way after the 2023 election but opted against doing as the other parties refused to include guarantees the party had sought in the coalition agreement, such as the decriminalisation of abortion and higher expenditure targets for issues such as healthcare and housing. However, it vowed to support Tusk's government in votes of confidence. It temporarily abstained from criticizing the Civic Coalition-led government, with Adrian Zandberg arguing that "We need to let the people who sit behind these doors and work on the government’s program simply work."

However, Razem became increasingly disenchanted with the government and clashed with it on a number of issues, including the proposed 2025 budget, and as such, with its coalition partner New Left, which entered government while Razem did not. In this context, membership in The Left coalition became increasingly untenable. As a result, on 11–12 October, a non-binding, consultative referendum was held to decide the course of the party ahead of a party congress on 26–27 October. 54% of participating members voted to leave the Left coalition. In expectation of and against this course being taken by the party at the congress, five Razem parliamentarians, including co-leader Magdalena Biejat, announced they would be leaving the party and remaining in The Left (parliamentary) coalition on 24 October. The party then voted to leave the Left coalition, with 0 votes against, on 27 October. In December, Zandberg was re-elected, while Aleksandra Owca became a new co-leader of the party.

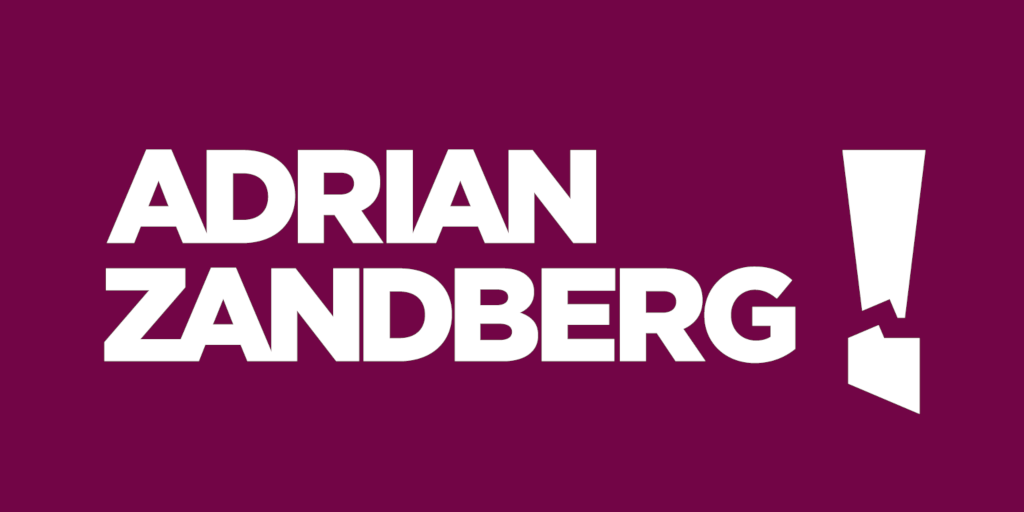
Zandberg 2025 campaign logo

On 11 January 2025, the party's National Council designated Adrian Zandberg as a candidate in the presidential election scheduled on 18 May.

On 12 November 2025, MP Paulina Matysiak was expelled from the party by its National Board, who stated "further political cooperation within a single party is impossible". This was based on a provision for "specially justified cases", added to the party's charter 3 days earlier.

== Ideology ==
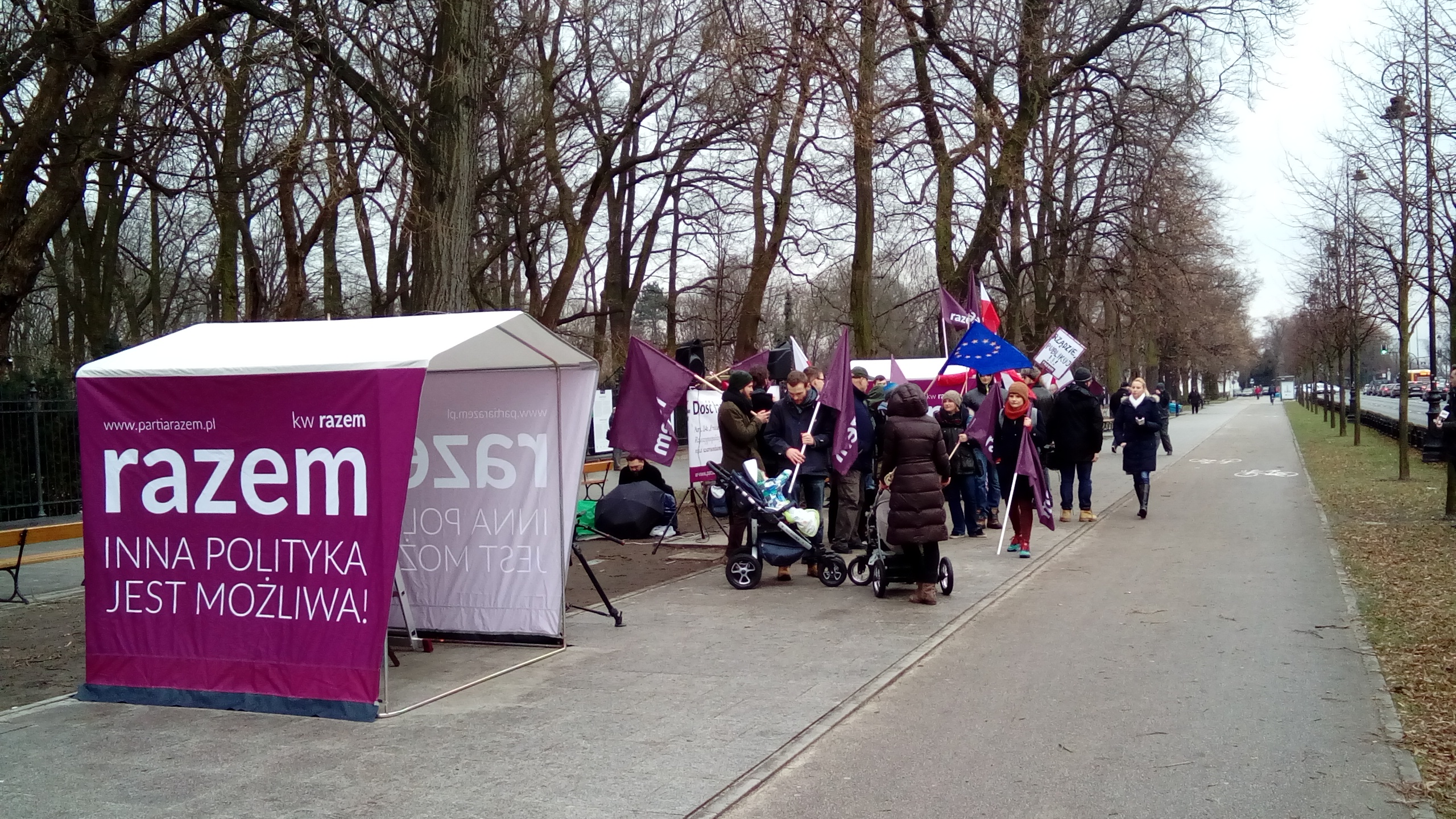
Razem activists protesting the Polish Constitutional Court crisis

Razem has been described as "slightly to the left of SLD". According to political scientist Filip Ilkowski, Razem "resembles the Union of Labour in looking for inspiration in the Scandinavian model of social democracy (with a strongly EU-orientated approach) but combined with patterning itself on some new left formations, chiefly Podemos in the Spanish state". While some compare it to the radical left, the party is not anti-capitalist and is considered to lean towards social liberalism instead. The party rejects neoliberalism and supports principles of progressivism. It strongly condemns communism and called labelling it as such offensive.

Razem was founded by feminist and anarchist groups, and was inspired by anti-austerity parties such as Syriza and Podemos. Political scientist Luke March described Razem as "closest to the radical left" amongst Polish parliamentary parties. However, he noted that the party breaks with the radical left through its anti-communism, as well as pro-EU and pro-Euro policies; Razem narrowly represents the interests of specific occupational sectors. Razem presents itself as a left-most alternative to all Polish parliamentary parties with a distinctly pro-worker and pro-social program, although its self-portrayal is considered to be undermined by the fact that the party entered the Sejm on The Left electoral lists, and did not fully break with either The Left or the governing 15 October Coalition until late 2024. It presents "a strong militaristic and pro-NATO position" on foreign affairs.

In December 2017, Razem rebuked its activist, Łukasz Moll, for calling himself a "democratic communist", prompting his resignation from the party. Although some label the party democratic socialist, Razem is generally critical towards state socialism as a system. Razem defends Karl Marx from a social-democratic perspective, as the party's leader Adrian Zandberg praised Marx as "the father of west European social democracy" while strongly comdemning "the totalitarian regimes of the second half of 20th century, that existed in eastern Europe, in Russia". However, the party strongly distances itself from and condemns communism:

When the then leader of the neoliberal party Modern, Ryszard Petru, described the Together Party as “communists” in October 2017, Zandberg threatened him with a lawsuit—not the usual way the party answers its critics, especially in a country where “communist” is a regular insult used against each other by the two major political camps. There were altogether three cases where the Together Party sued right-wing politicians and journalists, who labeled it as “communist” or “Bolshevik.” Moreover, when in the context of one such case a member of the Together Party wrote a text provocatively titled “I Am a Communist from Together. And There Are Countless Numbers of Us,” he was immediately condemned by the party leadership and soon resigned from membership before he could be expelled.

=== Economic, tax and labour policy ===
The party's economic programme has been described as social democratic; it advocates labour rights and opposes deregulation and privatisation of public services. Among its main goals are strengthening redistribution, adopting a 35-hour workweek, raising the income tax threshold to the equivalent of 12 times the minimum wage (ca. $3,200 as of 2016), establishing progressive corporate tax, and creating a healthcare programme funded directly from the state budget.

The party also postulates liquidation of junk contracts (predatory, unregulated working contracts), a ban on health care commercialisation, refunding of in vitro and contraception treatments, restrictions on trade on Sundays and holidays, raising the tax-free amount, introducing a progressive tax for enterprises, increasing the length of parental leave and reducing MPs’ salaries. It also wishes to completely remove special economic zones from Poland. It has also proposed a "CEO tax" which would be 75% of the amount exceeding the annual income of PLN 500,000.

The party's economic programme is partially inspired by the Nordic model, and it considers itself part of the anti-austerity movement. British economist Guy Standing describes Razem as "the first authentic movement in Poland representing the precariat". Journalist Michał Syska wrote on the party's program:

The party’s political programme contains references to the idea of the “welfare state”, and Razem’s spokespersons often bring up solutions applied in the Nordic model of the welfare state. The party’s politicians do not question the market economy as a whole; rather, they challenge its neoliberal model. Razem’s political agenda represents, without doubt, a social democratic programme from before the introduction of the Third Way by Tony Blair and Gerhard Schroeder towards the end of the 20th century.

=== Environmental politics ===
Razem believes that Poland should "actively engage in the fight against climate change" and expresses its willingness to "take the necessary steps to adapt the economy [of Poland] to the challenges of climate change". The party is a strong supporter of policies to mitigate the effects of climate change. In the party’s programme, it is stated that by 2030, Poland should reduce its carbon dioxide emissions by at least half and by 2050, achieve full climate neutrality. The party proposes, in place of fossil fuels, an energy mix based on renewable energy sources and nuclear energy, and giving priority to research into new energy technologies and the adaptation of the energy system itself.

=== Social policy ===
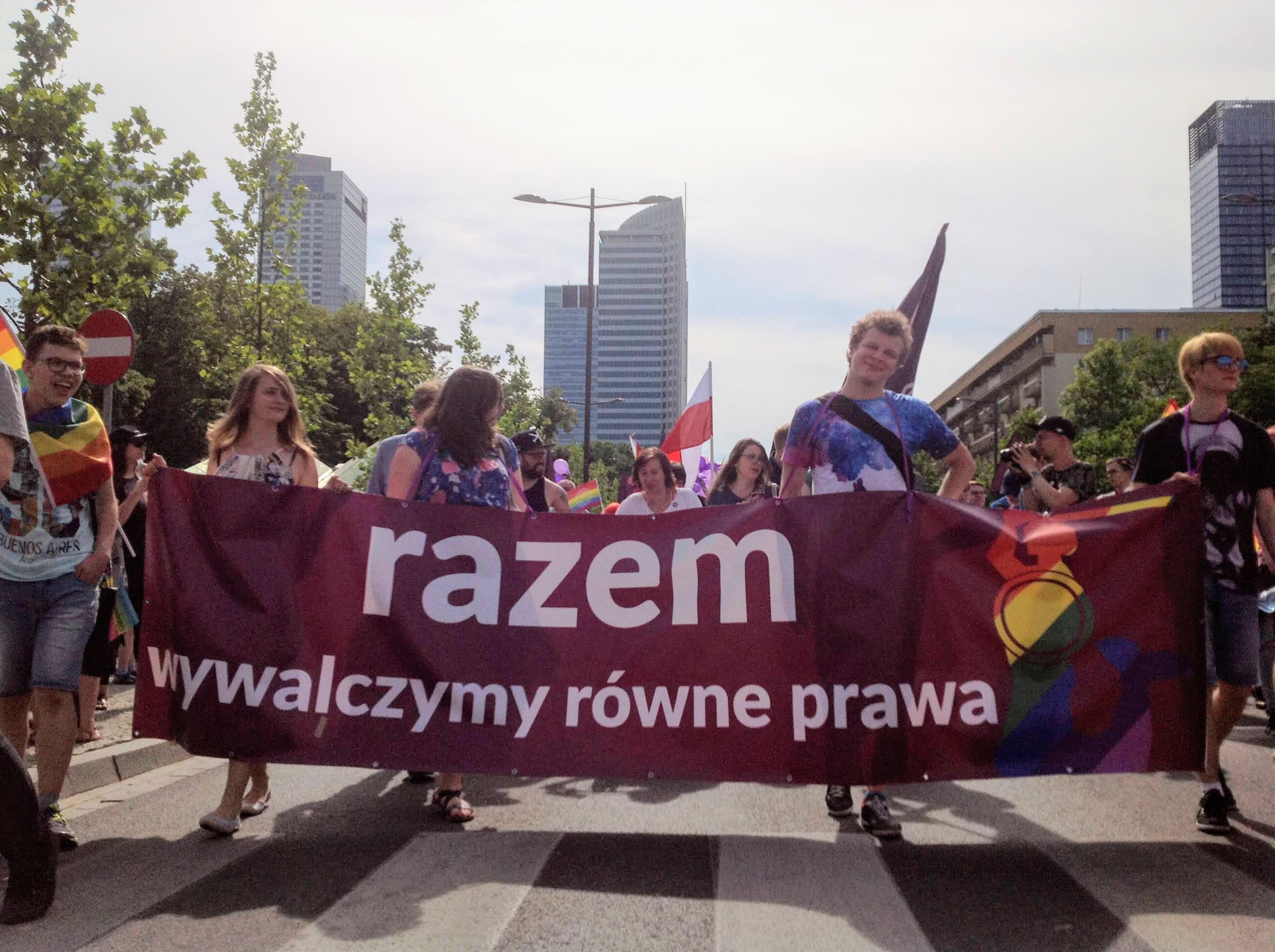
Razem activists during 2018 Parada Równości

Razem is socially progressive, supporting drug liberalisation, sex education in schools and LGBT rights, and has been described as libertarian on social issues. It also strictly follows gender quotas and is for liberalising Poland's abortion law. At the same time, Polish political scientists Michał Słowikowski and Michał Pierzgalski note that the party prioritises economic issues over social ones:

As far as the normative component of Razem’s programme is concerned, Polityka columnists have pointed out that it is not entirely dominated only by a classic leftist doctrine. While they sympathise with LGBT rights, they consider that economic conditions are key to resolving normative issues. They perceive same-sex marriages or the abortion law through the prism of material conditions, and believe that the rights of women and sexual minorities would be better protected if certain economic conditions were achieved.

At the same time, the party has been criticized for compromising its socioeconomic stances through its focus on social progressivism. It participated in LGBT marches together with commercial banks and megacorporations such as BNP Paribas, Accor, MSD, Goldman Sachs, JP Morgan, Danske Bank, Accenture, Deloitte, and Ikea, despite otherwise criticizing big business for wealth inqeuality and claiming to fight against "ultra-capitalism" represented by these corporations. Political scientist Aleks Szczerbiak argued that Razem failed "to attract a broader range of support beyond the well-educated urban “hipsters” that formed its core electorate."

The party is hostile towards the Catholic Church, arguing that there should be "essentially no room for cooperation between the state and the church" and postulating the need to stop formulating any agreements with the Church. It advocates for anti-clericalism, including opposition to teaching Catholic religion in public schools, outlawing the conscientious objection right, and abolishing state funding of the Church. Razem supports a concept of a secular state that would ensure "freedom from religion" for its citizens. It also supports exclusion of religious elements from state and school ceremonies and buildings, and argues that "religious associations should support themselves by running their own businesses". The party also wants to remove the offending religious feelings from the Polish penal law.

It has opposed the introduction of Single Member Electoral Constituencies for elections to the Polish Sejm, which in their opinion leads to the creation of a two-party system. Razem is also critical of left-leaning big tent projects such as the United Left, arguing that the Polish left has discredited itself by working together with people like Leszek Miller (former Democratic Left Alliance Prime Minister) and Janusz Palikot (leader of Your Movement). Razem's founders state that "the postcommunist left-wing parties must disappear, so that a new, modern, European left party can reclaim the leftist vote".

The party maintains a critical attitude towards the Polish People's Republic and condemns its system and authoritarian practices; however the party also opposes the so-called decommunisation laws and the Institute of National Remembrance, which they deem are used by the Polish right to wage a war against the historic memory and legacy of the political left.

On the issue of migration, Razem advocates an open door migration policy. It poses a welcoming stance to refugees entering Poland and considers it an obligation of the Polish state to 'help the most deprived'. It opposes the construction of border barriers.

=== Foreign and defence policy ===
Razem has been described as pro-European, and pro-NATO. The party supports an active role for Poland in the international community, citing the United Nations and OSCE as the most important organisations in that context.

The party is a strong supporter of the European Union and has taken a stance against Brexit. The party believes that the EU, in its current form, represents the interests of 'big business', but has nonetheless found 'indisputable successes' and could be reformed to create a 'progressive' pan-European social and tax policy. The party is a proponent of stronger European integration. The party further proposes the creation of an EU army, and is also a supporter of federalizing the EU.

On the other hand, in 2019 the party has criticised the Eurozone, stating that it had been 'poorly thought-out' and could lead to financial shocks in 'weaker Union economies', however adding that if the 'reformed' Eurozone were to become 'truly solidary', it would fully support Poland's adoption of the Euro. In the 2025 Polish presidential election, Razem presented a more pro-European stance, advocating an open-door migration policy, increased European Union cooperation and immediate adoption of the euro.

The party explicitly rejected views that the blame for the Russo-Ukrainian War might lie with Ukraine or NATO. It supports deliver of weapons and military supplies to Ukraine and also supports sanctions against Russia. The party also moved towards supporting NATO, praising it as "the most effective guarantor of Poland's and Europe's security at present". At the same time, the party declared that it is convinced that NATO alone was 'not a sufficient tool' to ensure the lasting security of Poland and Europe, instead preferring the creation of an EU Army through the Common Security and Defence Policy. Razem cut ties with the DiEM25 movement of Yanis Varoufakis because of DiEM25's opposition to NATO.

Razem supports efforts for international arms control and disarmament as part of a larger 'peace policy'. The party states that it opposes 'all forms of imperialism' and has condemned the 2003 invasion of Iraq, which they deem to be a violation of international law. It has condemned Russian President Vladimir Putin's foreign policy, what they deem to be the Kremlin's 'nationalist hysteria', 'extreme conservatism' and 'legally sanctioned homophobia', as well as the Russian annexation of Crimea. It criticised the 2022 Russian invasion of Ukraine as "Putin that has repeatedly broken international law by infringing upon the territorial integrity of a neighbouring country". At the same time, it has criticised 'the policy of the conservative-liberal Ukrainian government'. Razem stated that if it were in power, it would 'support social justice [in Ukraine] and limit the influence of the Ukrainian oligarchy'.

The party opposes TTIP and CETA, as they believe they will "lead to the undermining of financial stability and rapid growth of debt". The party has also expressed sympathy and support for the Syrian and Turkish Kurds and has condemned Turkey's ruling AK Party, which they consider authoritarian and discriminatory.

== Structure and leadership ==
Pursuant to the party statute, the Congress has the supreme authority within the party and convenes once a year. It consists of delegates selected within party districts. Other national bodies of the party are the:

- National Council, a deliberative and regulatory assembly;
- National Board, an executive body, led by two co-chairpersons selected with quotaism rule through universal suffrage by party members;
- National Audit Commission, carrying out evaluations and supervising adherence to the statute;
- National Electoral Commission, conducting party elections and referendums;
- Party Court of Arbitration, conducting mediations and dysciplinary proceedings.

The National Board has exercised a collective executive leadership until November 2022, when co-chairperson posts were introduced by a statute amendment.

Party co-leaders
Co-leader	Tenure	Co-leader	Tenure
Magdalena Biejat	27 November 2022 – 24 October 2024	Adrian Zandberg	27 November 2022 – Incumbent
Aleksandra Owca	3 December 2024 – Incumbent	Adrian Zandberg	27 November 2022 – Incumbent

== Parliamentary representation ==
=== Members elected to the 9th term Sejm ===
Name	Constituency	Votes (%)
Paulina Matysiak	Sieradz (no. 11)	16,757 (3.64%)
Magdalena Biejat	Warszawa I (no. 19)	19,501 (1.41%)
Daria Gosek-Popiołek	Kraków (no. 13)	17,488 (2.69%)
Maciej Konieczny	Katowice (no. 31)	22,262 (4.74%)
Adrian Zandberg	Warszawa I (no. 19)	140,898 (10.20%)
Marcelina Zawisza	Opole (no. 21)	19,206 (4.73%)

=== Members elected to the 10th term Sejm ===
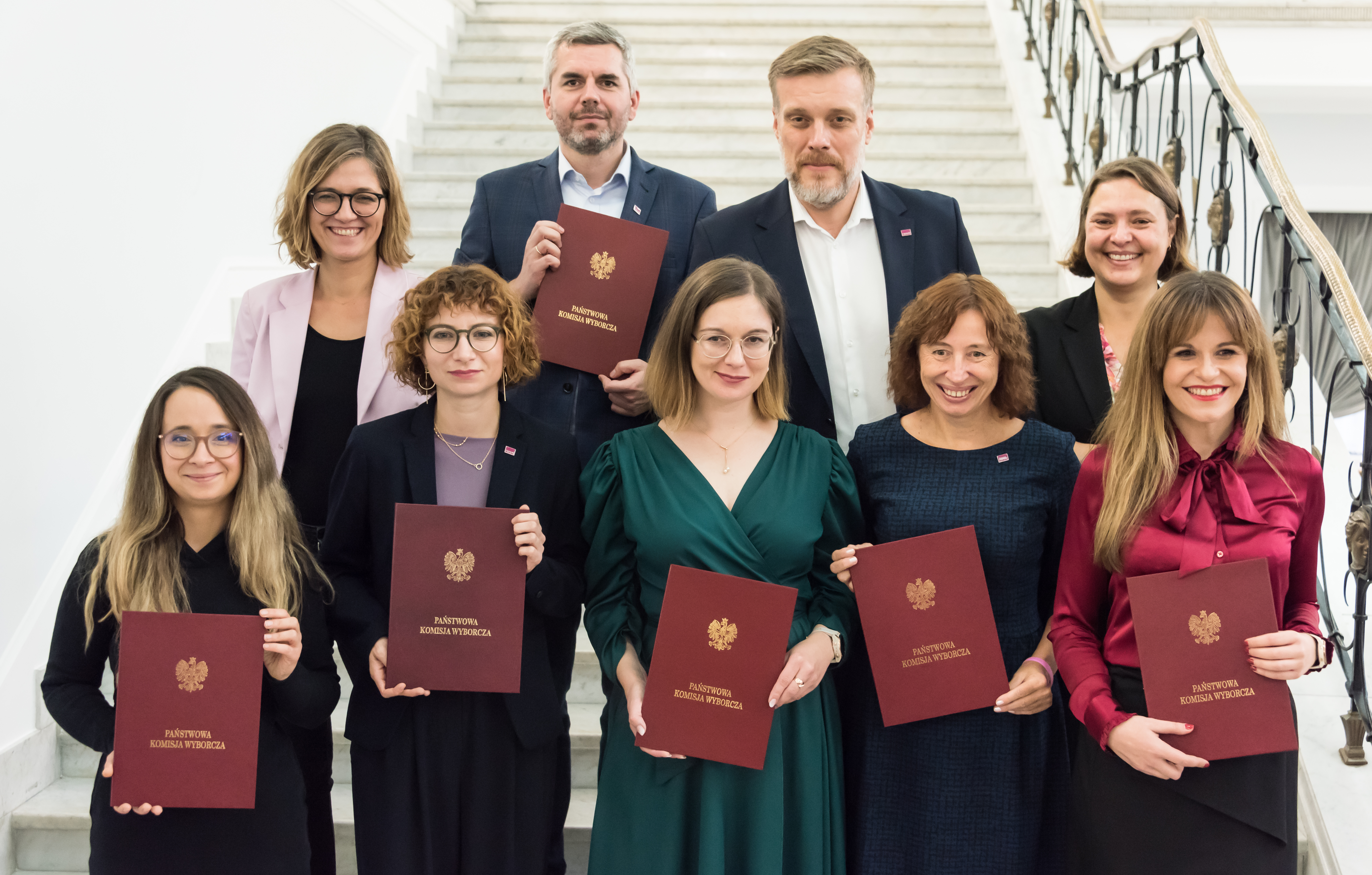
All 2023 electees with their PKW certificates

Name	Sejm constituency	Votes (%)
Maciej Konieczny	Katowice (no. 31)	17,901 (3.40%)
Marta Stożek	Wrocław (no. 3)	19,434 (2.50%) (Note: Entered office in 2024)
Adrian Zandberg	Warszawa I (no. 19)	64,435 (3.76%)
Marcelina Zawisza	Opole (no. 21)	19,388 (4.04%)

=== Former members elected to the 10th term Sejm and 11th term Senate ===
Name	Sejm constituency	Votes (%)
Daria Gosek-Popiołek	Kraków (no. 13)	39,054 (5.16%)
Dorota Olko	Warszawa I (no. 19)	44,188 (2.58%)
Joanna Wicha	Warszawa II (no. 20)	15,324 (2.10%)
Paulina Matysiak	Sieradz (no. 11)	17,695 (3.32%)

Name	Senate constituency	Votes (%)
Magdalena Biejat	Western Warsaw (no. 45) (Note: Consists of Bemowo, Ochota, Ursus, and Włochy districts.)	204,934 (72.40%)
Anna Górska	Kashubia (no. 63)	89,216 (38.17%)

== Election results ==
=== Presidential ===
Election	Candidate	1st round		2nd round	
Election	Candidate	Votes	%	Votes	%
2020	Endorsed Robert Biedroń	432,129	2.2 (#6)		
2025	Adrian Zandberg	952,832	4.86 (#6)		

=== Sejm ===
Election	Votes	%	Seats	+/−	Government
2015	550,349	3.62 (#8)	0 / 460	New	Extra-parliamentary
2019	2,319,946	12.56 (#3)	6 / 460	▲6	PiS
2019	As part of the Democratic Left Alliance party list, that won 49 seats in total. (Note: The officially registered as Sojusz Lewicy Demokratycznej (Democratic Left Alliance) party list also included candidates of other The Left coalition parties.)				
2023	1,859,018	8.61 (#4)	7 / 460	▲1	PiS Minority (2023)
2023	1,859,018	8.61 (#4)	7 / 460	▲1	KO–PL2050–PSL–NL (2023–2024)
2023	1,859,018	8.61 (#4)	7 / 460	▲1	KO–PL2050–PSL–NL (2024–2026)
2023	1,859,018	8.61 (#4)	7 / 460	▲1	KO–PSL–PL2050–C–NL (2026–present)
2023	As part of The Left coalition, that won 26 seats in total. (Note: The officially registered as Nowa Lewica (New Left) party list also included candidates of other The Left coalition parties. The list belong to the wider Senate Pact for the Senate election.)				

=== Senate ===
Election	Votes	%	Seats	+/−	Majority
2023	1,131,639	5.29 (#4)	2 / 100	New	KO–TD–L (2023–2024)
2023	1,131,639	5.29 (#4)	2 / 100	New	KO–TD–L (2024–present)
2023	As part of The Left coalition, that won 9 seats in total.				

=== European Parliament ===
Election	Leader	Votes	%	Seats	+/−	EP Group
2019	Magdalena Biejat; Adrian Zandberg	168,745	1.24 (#6)	0 / 52	New	−
2019	As the Left Together coalition, that didn't win any seat.					
2024	Magdalena Biejat; Adrian Zandberg	741,071	6.30 (#5)	0 / 53	0	−
2024	As part of The Left coalition, that won 3 seats in total.					

=== Sejmiks ===
Election	Votes	%	Seats	+/−
2018	242,511	1.57 (#8)	0 / 552	New
2024	911,430	6.32 (#5)	1 / 552	▲1
2024	As part of The Left, which won 8 seats in total.			

== List of notable Razem politicians ==
- Adrian Zandberg
- Marcelina Zawisza
- Marta Stożek
- Maciej Konieczny
- Wojciech Browarny
- Piotr Czerniawski
- Paweł Dembowski
- Tomasz Ganicz
- Monika Kostera
- Mateusz Merta

Former members include:

- Paulina Matysiak
- Daria Gosek-Popiołek
- Dorota Olko
- Joanna Wicha
- Anna Górska
- Agnieszka Dziemianowicz-Bąk
- Kasia Babis
- Magdalena Biejat
