= Mahmoud Khalifa =

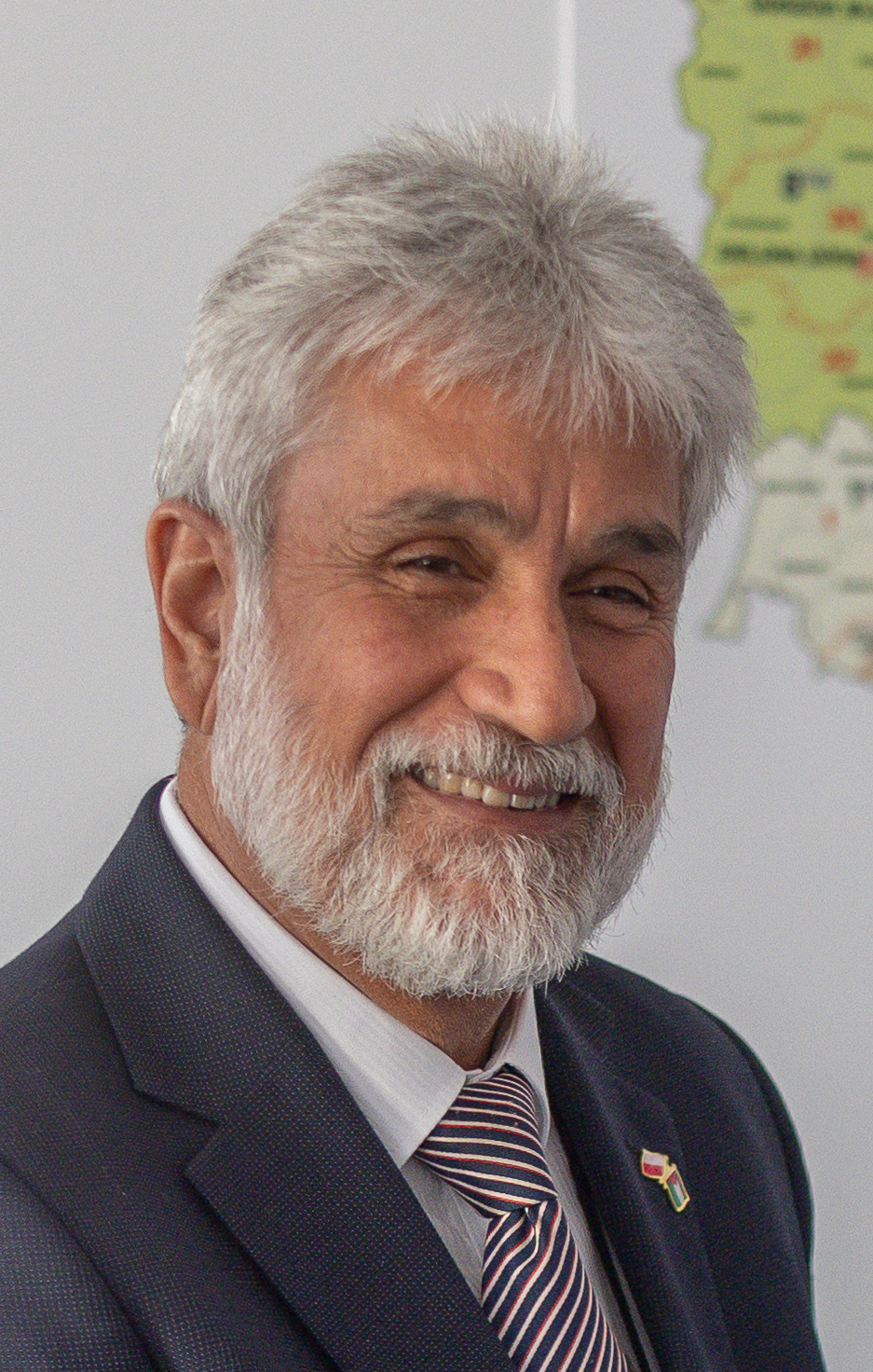
- Khalifa in 2025 at a meeting with the Lewica club

Ambassador of Palestine in Poland
- Incumbent
- Assumed office April 2018
- Preceded by: Azmi Al-Daqqa

Mahmoud Khalifa (born 19 February 1962) is a Palestinian diplomat and journalist, and the Ambassador of Palestine in Poland since April 2018. He was the former minister of information of the Palestinian Authority.

He completed education in Poland, knows the Polish language, and serves also as a deacon of the Arabian diplomatic corps in Poland.
