= The Left (Poland) =

Political alliance in Poland

The Left Lewica
- Leaders: Włodzimierz Czarzasty; Robert Biedroń; Magdalena Biejat
- Parliamentary leader: Anna Maria Żukowska
- Founded: 19 July 2019
- Preceded by: United Left
- Ideology: Social democracy; Social liberalism; Pro-Europeanism
- Political position: Centre-left
- National affiliation: Senate Pact 2023 (for 2023 Senate election)
- European Parliament group: Progressive Alliance of Socialists and Democrats (NL)
- Members: New Left; Polish Socialist Party; Labour Union; Social Democracy of Poland; Freedom and Equality; The City Is Ours; Lewica Razem (until 2024)
- Sejm: 21 / 460 (5%)
- Senate: 8 / 100 (8%)
- European Parliament: 3 / 53 (6%)
- Regional assemblies: 8 / 552 (1%)
- City Presidents: 11 / 107 (10%)

Website
- klub-lewica.org.pl

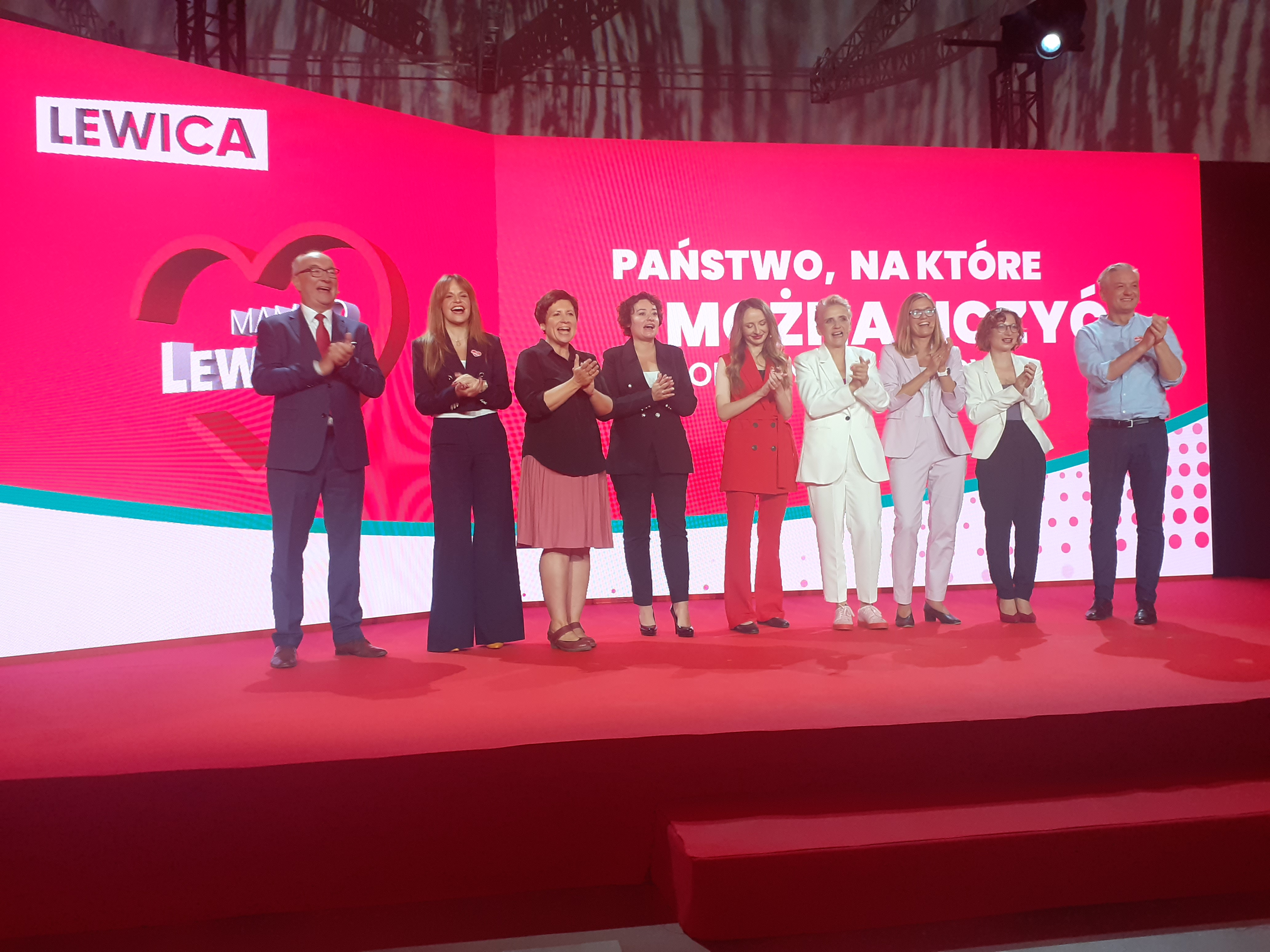
Members of The Left - from left: Włodzimierz Czarzasty, Dorota Olko, Agata Diduszko-Zyglewska, Anna Maria Żukowska, Agnieszka Dziemianowicz-Bąk, Joanna Scheuring-Wielgus, Magdalena Biejat, Daria Gosek-Popiołek, Robert Biedroń.

The Left (Polish: Lewica) is a political alliance in Poland. Initially founded to contest the 2019 parliamentary election, existed in this format until 2024, the alliance of the New Left, Lewica Razem (eng. Together Party) and other smaller parties.

It also originally consisted of Democratic Left Alliance and Spring until its merging to create the New Left, including the Polish Socialist Party that left the coalition in 2021. It is also supported by several minor left-wing parties, including Your Movement, Yes for Łódź, Urban Movement, and the Polish Communist Party.

The Left is a catch-all coalition of the Polish left, and it is positioned on the centre-left. It is mainly orientated towards the principles of social democracy, but it also advocates progressive, social-liberal and secular policies, including LGBT rights. Before the Razem party left it, The Left also had left-wing and democratic socialist factions. It is supportive of Poland's membership in the European Union.

In the 2023 Polish parliamentary election, The Left coalition technically participated as the New Left party, whose list included representatives of Left Together, Labour Union, Polish Socialist Party, Freedom and Equality and Social Democracy of Poland.

== Voter base ==
As Lewica is formed as a unification of the Polish left, it has attempted to diversify its platform and appeal to a broader range of voters, rather than relying mostly on the votes of former officials and civil servants during the PPR period, which had been and continues to be one of the Democratic Left Alliance's largest voting blocs. This attempt, however, was met with somewhat limited success by the fact that the coalition's pro-LGBT rights platform failed to appeal to working class and economically left-leaning Poles, which tend to favour a more socially conservative policy (especially as both economically interventionist and social conservative positions were already being provided by the right-wing PiS party). At the same time, the more liberally-oriented city-dwelling population, which could favour the party's proposed socially progressive policies, found little appeal in the party's platform of economic interventionism.

Despite this, some sociologists theorized that the unification of the parties could lead to an overall mobilization of leftist voters, which could now feel that their vote for the coalition wouldn't be wasted. This was confirmed to be the case when Lewica succeeded in electing 49 members to the Sejm and 2 members to the Senate of Poland in the 2019 Polish parliamentary election, thus making the coalition Poland's third largest political force and overturning a four-year absence of left-wing representatives in Poland's parliament.

In addition, the party's platform, which differs greatly from the platforms of the other major Polish political parties, has managed to find some support among disillusioned younger and secular voters, which don't identify with any political force or even with the left, but instead desire "something new".

At the same time, the party also received a considerable boost in support among older voters after the ruling PiS party passed a "degradation law", which cut retirement pensions and disability benefits for thousands of former bureaucrats during the PPR period, whose main income was now directly threatened by the new government policy. This led to an expansion and consolidation of the otherwise shrinking of the Democratic Left Alliance's previously described voting bloc.

=== Opposition years (2019–2023) ===
The Left (Lewica) returned to the Sejm in the 2019 parliamentary elections as a broad alliance of left-wing parties, including the Democratic Left Alliance (SLD), Spring (Wiosna), and Together (Razem). In those elections, The Left won 49 seats, making it the third largest political force in the Polish parliament at the time. From 2019 to 2023, the party operated in opposition to the Law and Justice (PiS) government. During this period, Lewica focused on social justice, the protection of workers’ rights, the expansion of welfare policies, gender equality, secularism, and the defense of minority and LGBT+ rights. It also emphasized public healthcare reform, affordable housing, and a progressive tax system. Despite its opposition status, the party occasionally supported government initiatives when these aligned with its social agenda, particularly during the COVID-19 pandemic. It consistently criticized the government for undermining the rule of law, weakening democratic institutions, and restricting civil liberties. Lewica was particularly vocal on issues related to women’s rights, especially following the tightening of abortion laws in 2020, and actively supported mass social protests that emerged in response to these changes.

=== Coalition government (2023–present) ===
Following the parliamentary elections of October 2023, The Left (Lewica) became part of the new governing coalition, alongside the Civic Coalition (KO) and the Third Way alliance. Its entry into government marked a significant return to executive power after several years in opposition and reflected the broader political shift away from conservative rule in Poland. Within the coalition framework, Lewica positioned itself as the main representative of social-democratic and progressive values.

Since joining the government, Lewica has focused on translating its long-standing programmatic goals into concrete policy measures. Particular emphasis has been placed on social policy, labor relations, and equality issues. The party has advocated for strengthening workers’ rights, improving job security, and increasing the role of the state in protecting employees, especially those in precarious forms of employment. It has also promoted reforms aimed at expanding access to public housing and improving the functioning of social welfare systems.

In the area of civil rights, Lewica has sought to advance policies related to gender equality, anti-discrimination protections, and the rights of minority groups. The party has emphasized the need to restore respect for the rule of law, reinforce democratic institutions, and rebuild trust between the state and civil society. Secularism and the clearer separation of church and state have remained important elements of its agenda within the governing coalition.

As part of the government, Lewica has also supported a strongly pro-European orientation, backing closer cooperation with European Union institutions and alignment with EU legal and democratic standards. While operating within a coalition that requires compromise, the party has aimed to maintain its distinct ideological identity by consistently emphasizing social justice, equality, and inclusiveness. Its participation in government since 2023 has therefore represented both an opportunity to implement left-wing policies and a test of its ability to balance principles with coalition governance.

== Ideology ==
The 2019 electoral program of the Left included:

- investments in renewable energy sources and energy efficiency,
- rewilding, including reforestation and restoration of wetlands,
- appointment of the Commissioner for Animal Rights, prohibition of fur farming, use of animals in circuses and cage farming,
- universal national crop insurance against drought and flooding,
- cameras on police uniforms recording in continuous mode,
- moving 1/4 of ministries and government agencies outside Warsaw,
- abolishing the Institute of National Remembrance and the National Day of Remembrance of the "cursed soldiers",
- increasing R&D expenditure to 2% of GDP,
- sick leave pay and sickness benefit amounting to 100% of the basic salary plus bonuses and allowances,
- establishing a minimum wage at 60% of the average wage,
- minimum wage of 3500 PLN in the public sector,
- widening the competences of the National Labour Inspectorate,
- a maximum fee for a prescription drug of 5 PLN,
- increasing public healthcare expenditure to 7.2% of GDP in 2024,
- introducing health and sex education in schools,
- extinguishing the reprivatization claims,
- establishing a public enterprise to provide one million flats in the years 2021–2031,
- in vitro fertilization reimbursement,
- fully paid and compulsory leave with a minimum of 12 weeks for both parents of a newborn,
- transparency of church funding and abolishing the Church Fund,
- Separation of church and state
- liberalising Poland's abortion law,
- gender quotas in the Council of Ministers,
- introducing same-sex marriage and civil partnerships.

== Parliamentary group ==
Parliamentary group under the name Coalition Parliamentary Club of the Left (Polish: Koalicyjny Klub Parlamentarny Lewicy) is chaired by Anna Maria Żukowska. It currently has 21 members in the Sejm, and 8 senators.

=== Current members ===
Party	Sejm	Senate
New Left	18 / 460 See list: Włodzimierz Czarzasty; Jacek Czerniak; Agnieszka Dziemianowicz-Bąk; Krzysztof Gawkowski; Katarzyna Kotula; Piotr Kowal; Anita Kucharska-Dziedzic; Marcin Kulasek; Łukasz Litewka; Wanda Nowicka; Arkadiusz Sikora; Wiesław Szczepański; Andrzej Szejna; Tadeusz Tomaszewski; Tomasz Trela; Katarzyna Ueberhan; Dariusz Wieczorek; Anna Maria Żukowska	4 / 100 See list: Maciej Kopiec; Marcin Karpiński; Małgorzata Sekuła-Szmajdzińska; Stanisław Pawlak
Polish Socialist Party	0 / 460	1 / 100 See list: Wojciech Konieczny
Labour Union	0 / 460	1 / 100 See list: Waldemar Witkowski
Independents	3 / 460 See list: Daria Gosek-Popiołek; Dorota Olko; Joanna Wicha	2 / 100 See list: Magdalena Biejat; Anna Górska

=== Former members ===
Party	Sejm	Senate
Partia Razem	4 / 460 See list: Maciej Konieczny; Marta Stożek; Adrian Zandberg; Marcelina Zawisza	0 / 100
Independents	1 / 460 See list: Paulina Matysiak	2 / 100

== Election results ==
=== Presidential ===
Election	Candidate	1st round		2nd round		Ref
Election	Candidate	Popular vote	% of votes	Popular vote	% of votes	Ref
2020	Robert Biedroń	432,129 (#6)	2.22			
2025	Magdalena Biejat	829,361 (#7)	4.23			

=== Sejm ===
Election	Leader	Popular vote	% of votes	Seats	+/−	Government	Ref
2019	Włodzimierz Czarzasty	2,319,946 (#3)	12.56	49 / 460	New	PiS	
2019	Officially registered as Democratic Left Alliance party list.						
2023	Włodzimierz Czarzasty, Robert Biedroń	1,859,018 (#4)	8.61	26 / 460	▼23	PiS Minority (2023)	
2023	Włodzimierz Czarzasty, Robert Biedroń	1,859,018 (#4)	8.61	26 / 460	▼23	KO–PL2050–PSL–NL (2023-2026)	
2023	Włodzimierz Czarzasty, Robert Biedroń	1,859,018 (#4)	8.61	26 / 460	▼23	KO–PSL–NL–PL2050–C (2026-present)	
2023	Officially registered as New Left party list.						

=== Senate ===
Election	Leader	Popular vote	% of votes	Seats	+/−	Majority	Ref
2019	Włodzimierz Czarzasty	415,745 (#4)	2.28	2 / 100	New	KO–PSL–L	
2019	Officially registered as Democratic Left Alliance party list.						
2023	Włodzimierz Czarzasty, Robert Biedroń	1,131,639 (#5)	5.29	9 / 100	▲7	KO–TD–L	
2023	Officially registered as New Left party list.						

=== European Parliament ===
Election	Leader	Popular vote	% of votes	Seats	+/−	Ref
2024	Robert Biedroń (Note: Candidate listed no. 1 in Warsaw.)	741,071 (#5)	6.30	3 / 53	▼5	

=== Regional Assemblies ===
Election	Leader	Popular vote	% of votes	Seats	+/−	Ref
2024	Włodzimierz Czarzasty, Robert Biedroń	911,430 (#5)	6.32	8 / 552	▼3	
