= Wicha =

Wicha may refer to:

- The Domesday Book spelling of Wicken, Cambridgeshire
- Wicha Nantasri (born 1986), Thai footballer
- Wicha (surname)
