= Polish Initiative =

Polish political party

Polish Initiative Inicjatywa Polska
- Abbreviation: iPL
- Leader: Barbara Nowacka
- Founded: 20 February 2016
- Registered: 2019
- Dissolved: 15 November 2025
- Split from: Your Movement; Democratic Left Alliance
- Merged into: Civic Coalition
- Headquarters: Warsaw
- Membership (2025): ~100
- Ideology: Social liberalism; Social democracy; Pro-Europeanism; Progressivism
- Political position: Centre to centre-left
- National affiliation: Civic Coalition; Senate Pact 2023 (for 2023 Senate election)
- European Parliament group: European People's Party Group
- Colours: Red; White

Website
- ipl.org.pl
- Politics of Poland; Political parties; Elections; A: It was variously described as right-wing, centre-right, centrist, centre-left, or left-wing.

The Polish Initiative (Polish: Inicjatywa Polska [i.ɲi.t͡sjaˈtɘ.va ˈpɔl.ska], iPL) was a progressive political party in Poland. It was formed as an association in 2016, and was registered as a political party in 2019. Its leader was Barbara Nowacka, and it was part of the Civic Coalition. It supported principles of social liberalism, social democracy and secularism. It was described as right-wing, centre-right, centrist, centre-left or left-wing.

In October 2025 the party merged into the Civic Coalition. It formally dissolved itself on 15 November 2025.

== History ==
The association Polish Initiative was created on February 20, 2016, by Barbara Nowacka, a former member of the Your Movement and the United Left electoral alliance for the 2015 parliamentary election. It was registered as a political party in 2019.

In 2018, the Initiative joined the Civic Coalition for the local elections. Two of its candidates were elected to the Voivodeship sejmiks.

The association joined the European Coalition for the 2019 European Parliament election. However, because of being in the process of the registration as a political party, its members did not compete in the election.

The party joined the Civic Coalition for the 2019 parliamentary election. Two of the party candidates, including its leader Barbara Nowacka and two candidates recommended by the party, were elected to the Sejm. The Coalition won 134 in total, losing to the ruling party Law and Justice.

The Polish Initiative supported the Civic Coalition's candidate Małgorzata Kidawa-Błońska in the 2020 presidential election. Later, the Polish Initiative announced that it would as a party not take part in the election on 10 May, due to change of electoral rules because of the COVID-19 pandemic. However, after the election was moved it supported Rafał Trzaskowski, who became the Civic Coalition's candidate after the resignation of Małgorzata Kidawa-Błońska. Trzaskowski later lost in the second round to the incumbent Andrzej Duda.

On 15 November 2025, the party's congress voted to dissolve the party, with 91 members voting for and 4 abstaining. It also decided to donate party's assets to a pro-abortion organization Federa. The dissolution of the party was done to fulfill its integration into the Civic Coalition, a merger of Civic Platform, Modern and Polish Initiative which held its unification congress on 24 October. All three parties were members of the alliance of the same name founded for the 2019 election. The fourth member of the alliance, the Greens, opted to remain a separate party. The majority of iPL members declared that they would now join the newly-founded Civic Coalition.

== Ideology ==
The Polish Initiative was a progressive, socially liberal, anti-clerical, pro-European, and social-democratic party. It was variously described as located on the right, centre-right, centrist, centre-left or left-wing of the political spectrum.

The party supported the decentralisation of power and increasing the power of local governments. It also supported European integration. On social issues, it was against any forms of discrimination, with an emphasis on gender discrimination. The party also advocated for the separation of church and state. The party also supported increasing the funding of the Polish healthcare system.

== Election results ==
=== Presidential ===
Election year	Candidate	1st round		2nd round	
Election year	Candidate	# of overall votes	% of overall vote	# of overall votes	% of overall vote
2020	supported Rafał Trzaskowski	5,917,340	30.5 (#2)	10,018,263	48.9 (#2)

=== Sejm ===
Election year	Leader	Votes	%	Seats	+/–	Government
2019	Barbara Nowacka	113,278	0.6	6 / 460	New	PiS
2019	As part of Civic Coalition, which won 134 seats in total.					
2023	Barbara Nowacka	252,021	1.2	4 / 460	▼2	
2023	Barbara Nowacka	252,021	1.2	4 / 460	▼2	PiS Minority (2023)
2023	Barbara Nowacka	252,021	1.2	4 / 460	▼2	KO–PL2050–PSL–NL (2023-present)
2023	As part of Civic Coalition, which won 157 seats in total.					

=== European Parliament ===
Election	Leader	Votes	%	Seats	+/–	EP Group
2024	Barbara Nowacka	4,359,443	37.06 (#1)	1 / 53	New	EPP
2024	As part of Civic Coalition, which won 21 seats in total.					

=== Regional Assemblies ===
Election year	Percentage of vote	Number of overall seats won	+/–
2018	27.0 (#2)	2 / 552	
2018	As part of Civic Coalition, which won 194 seats in total.		

== Board ==
Leader

- Barbara Nowacka

Secretary

- Tomasz Sybilski

Treasurer

- Katarzyna Osowiecka

Other members

- Anna Uzdowska-Gacek
- Barbara Starska
- Dariusz Joński
- Szymon Wiłnicki
- Adam Ostaszewski
- Mateusz Rambacher
- Arkadiusz Dzierżyński
