= Piotr Czerniawski =

Polish poet

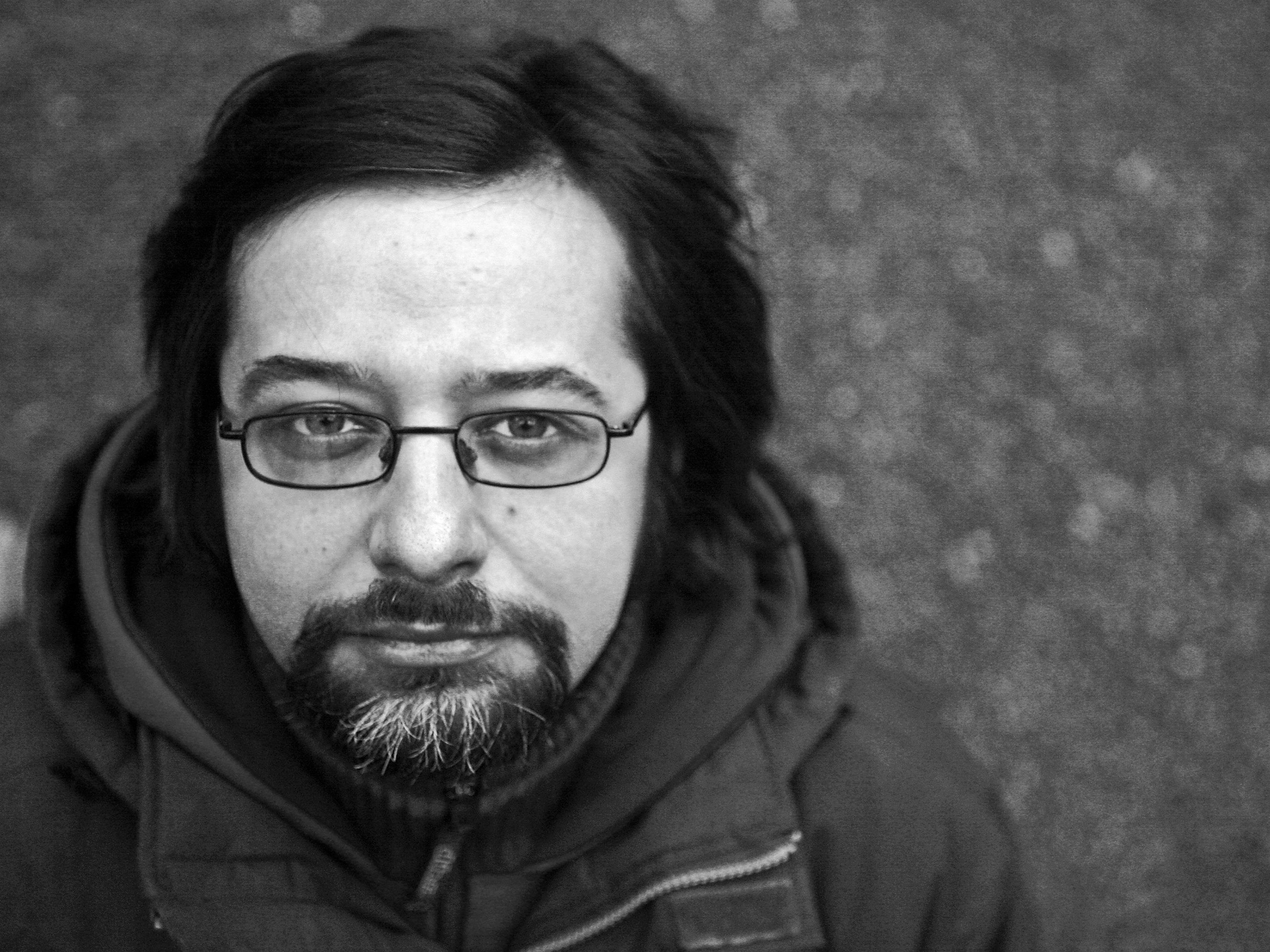
- Born: 20 June 1976
- Occupation: Poet

Piotr Czerniawski (born June 20, 1976 in Wrocław) is a Polish poet. He has published two books of poetry and writes for "Rita Baum" magazine.

His poetry has been compared to the work of Marcin Sendecki, Filip Zawada, Grzegorz Wróblewski. Cooperates with poetry vertical portal Nieszuflada.pl. Vice-president of Wikimedia Poland Association from December 15, 2007 to 2011.

A member of the left-wing Razem political party since 2015. In May 2016 he was elected to the party's National Council.

== Works ==
- 30 łatwych utworów, OKiS, Wrocław 1999
- Poprawki do snów, Korporacja Ha!art, Kraków 2005 ISBN 83-89911-21-3
- Przed południem in anthology Wolałbym nie 2009, Korporacja Ha!art, Kraków 2009, ISBN 978-83-61407-97-3
- Końcowki. Henryk Bereza mówi (with Adam Wiedemann), Korporacja Ha!art, Kraków 2010, ISBN 978-83-61407-15-7

== Bibliography ==
- Tekstylia bis. Słownik młodej polskiej kultury, ed. Piotr Marecki, Kraków 2006, s. 174-175. ISBN 978-83-89911-43-8
