= Maciej Konieczny =

Polish politician (born 1980)

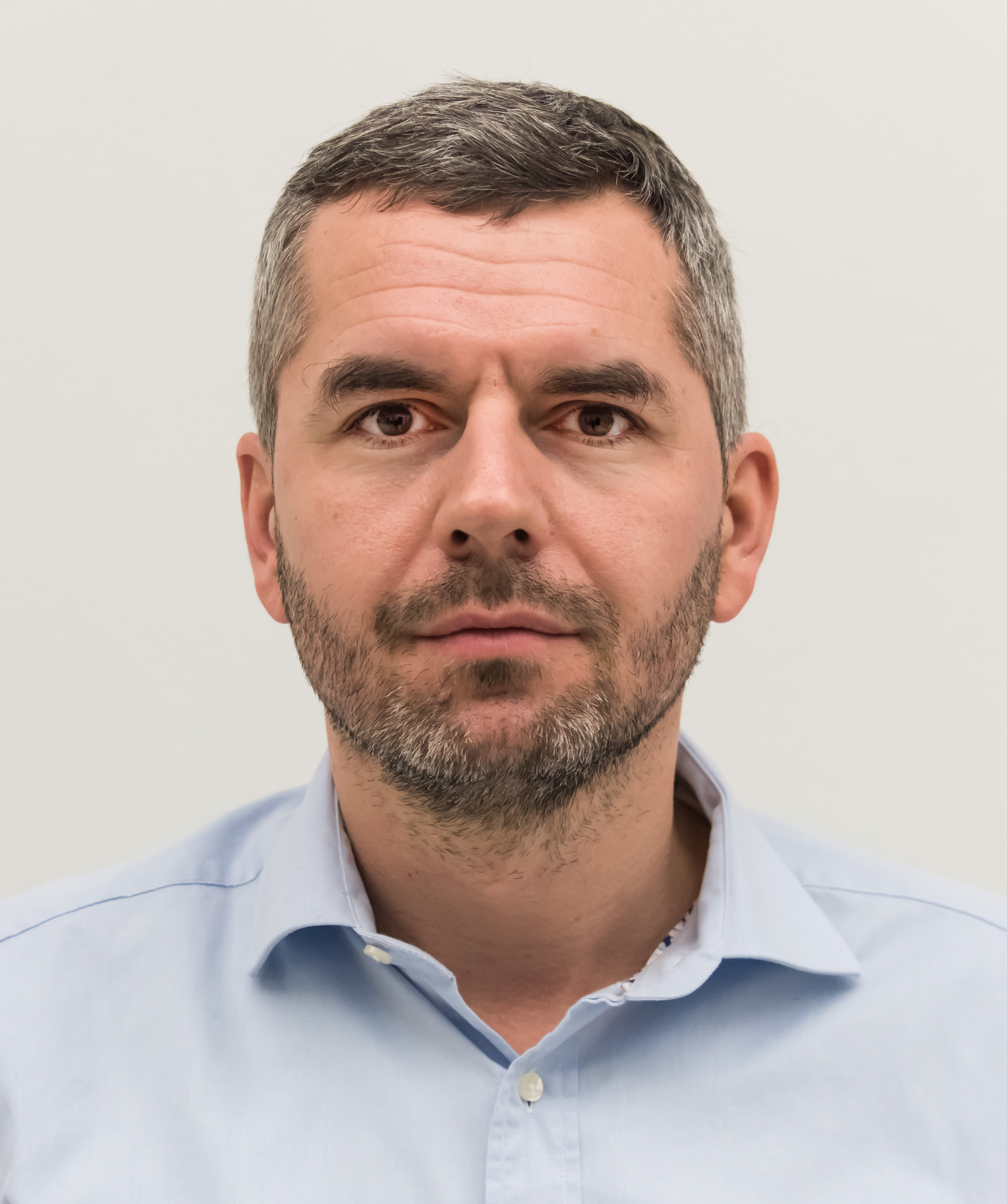
- Maciej Konieczny (2020)

Member of the Sejm
- Incumbent
- Assumed office 12 November 2019

Personal details
- Born: Maciej Konieczny; 14 October 1980 (age 45) Gliwice, Poland
- Party: Green Party (2013–2015), Partia Razem (2015–present)
- Occupation: Politician

Maciej Konieczny [ˈmat͡ɕɛj ˈkɔɲɛt͡ʂnɨ] (born 14 October 1980) is a Polish culture expert, left-wing politician, member of the Board of the Partia Razem party.

== Life ==
He was born in 1980 in Gliwice in an intellectual family. In his youth he sympathized with nationalists; he describes himself from this period as a fascist and he cuts himself off about it. During his time as a student he made a living from odd jobs, and later also worked abroad, at Cardiff Airport. He graduated in cultural studies at the University of Silesia in the specialization of literature and popular culture (2005).

=== Political career ===
He encountered leftism during his studies and became fascinated with feminism and alterglobalist movements. At the end of his studies, he joined the Association for the Taxation of Financial Transactions and for Citizens' Action (Poland), of which he was a representative at ATTAC Europa. He co-organized the LPP boycott and the ZTM Ticket Price Increases campaign. He was also active in the Young Socialists association (where he met, among others, Adrian Zandberg, Barbara Nowacka and Marcelina Zawisza), in which he was a member of the national council for some time. After choosing Adam Ostolski as chairman of the Green Party, he decided to join this organization. In 2014, he took part in the election to the European Parliament from the Greens list in constituency No. 4. In January 2015 he left the Greens.

=== Partia Razem ===
In May 2015, he became one of the founders of Partia Razem, a new political party, and was elected to the nine-member Board, together with Jakub Baran, Aleksandra Cacha, Alicja Czubek, Magdalena Malińska, Mateusz Mirys, Katarzyna Paprota, Adrian Zandberg, and Marcelina Zawisza.

Konieczny was placed on the first place on Razem's Słupsk candidate list of the Sejm elections in October 2015. He did not get a deputy's seat, because the party did not meet the required national threshold of 5%.

In the 2019 parliamentary election Konieczny obtained a Sejm seat as an SLD candidate, receiving 22,262 votes in the Katowice constituency. He was then reelected in 2023.
