= Wojciech Browarny =

Polish literary historian

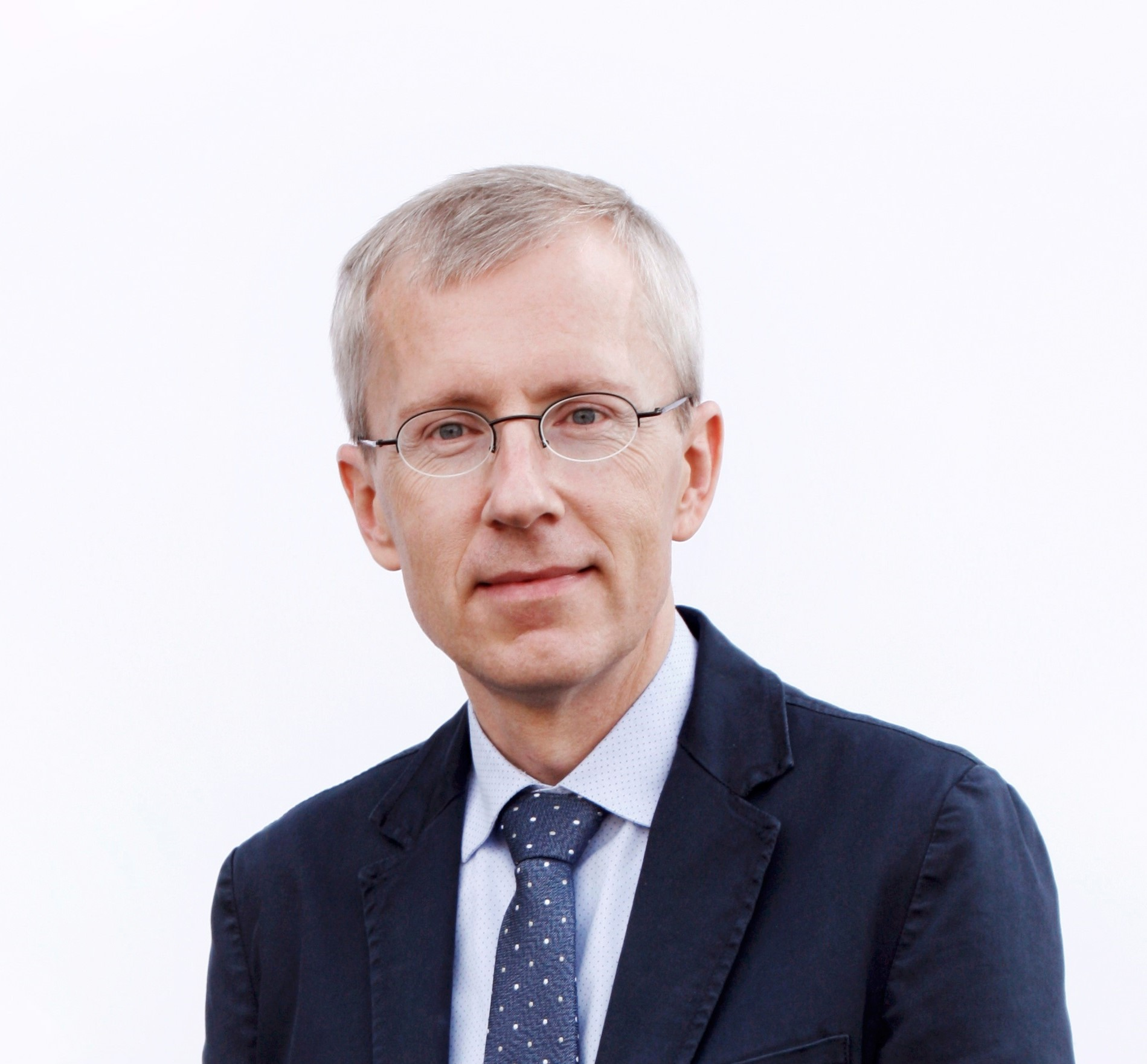
- Wojciech Browarny
- Born: Wojciech Jan Browarny; 1970 (age 55–56); Oleśnica, Poland
- Citizenship: Polish
- Education: University of Wrocław
- Scientific career
- Fields: Polish literature, literary history, regional studies
- Workplaces: University of Wrocław

Wojciech Jan Browarny (born in 1970) is a Polish literary scholar, literary critic, regionalist scholar and associate professor at Wrocław University. He works at the Institute of Polish Philology of the University of Wrocław, where he heads the Department of History of Polish Literature after 1918 and the Regional Research Unit.

His research focuses on contemporary Polish literature, anthropological problems of modernity, relationships of culture and history with nature, and regional studies. In the years 1996–1999, he was in charge of the criticism section of the literary and artistic journal Dykcja. He contributes reviews to the monthlies Nowe Książki and Odra.

He is the chairman of the University Committee for the Care of Graves of Persons of Merit for the University of Wrocław. He has been elected a member of the Committee on Literary Studies of the Polish Academy of Sciences for the 2020–2023 term.

He belonged to the Wrocław branch of the Association of People of Silesian Nationality. He is a co-founder and secretary of the Rosa Luxemburg Society of Global Solidarity (Towarzystwo Solidarności Globalnej im. Róży Luksemburg) and a member of the political party Left Together (Lewica Razem). In the 2015 parliamentary election, he ran as the fourth candidate on Razem's list in the Wrocław electoral district. He received 931 votes.

== Selected works ==
- Opowieści niedyskretne. Formy autorefleksyjne w prozie polskiej lat dziewięćdziesiątych (Wrocław 2002).
- Fikcja i wspólnota. Szkice o tożsamości w literaturze współczesnej (Wrocław 2008).
- Tadeusz Różewicz i nowoczesna tożsamość (Kraków 2013).
- Tadeusz Różewicz and Modern Identity in Poland since the Second World War (transl. by P. Zazula, Wrocław 2019).
- Historie odzyskane. Literackie dziedzictwo Wrocławia i Dolnego Śląska (Wrocław 2019).
- Tadeusz Różewicz, Wybór prozy, ed. by Wojciech Browarny, BN I 338 (Wrocław 2021).
- W drodze. Wrocław śladami Tadeusza Różewicza (Wrocław 2021).
- Anatomia nowoczesnego regionu. O związkach środowiska, kultury i pamięci (Wrocław 2023).
