= Marta Stożek =

Member of Polish Sejm

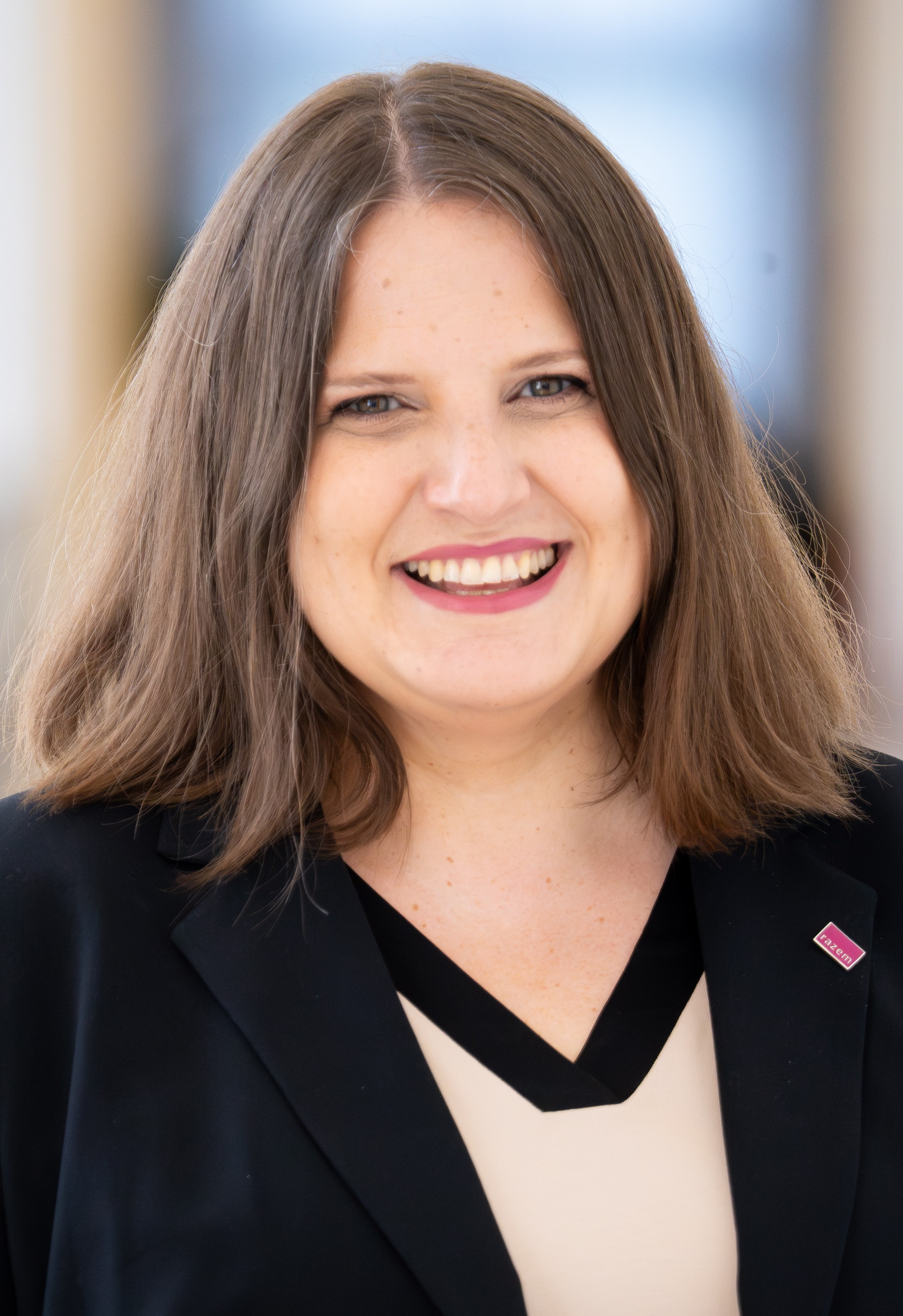
- Marta Stożek in 2024

Member of the Sejm
- Incumbent
- Assumed office 26 June 2024
- Constituency: 3-Wrocław

Personal details
- Born: Marta Magdalena Stożek; 6 August 1976 (age 49) Wrocław, Poland
- Party: Partia Razem (since 2019)
- Children: 5
- Occupation: Politician
- Website: www.martastozek.pl

Marta Magdalena Stożek (born 6 August 1976) is a Polish politician, serving as a member of the Sejm since 2024.

== Early life and education ==
Stożek comes from a working-class family. She initially pursued but did not complete a degree in technical physics. In 2015, she earned a bachelor's degree in Indian philology from the University of Wrocław. She has worked in various roles, including in the IT sector and as a manager for the HerStory Foundation, an organization focused on education.

== Political career ==
Stożek joined the party Partia Razem (Together Party), becoming a member of its national council and serving as its leader in Wrocław.

In the 2018 Polish local elections, she ran unsuccessfully for the Wrocław City Council as part of the "Wrocław for Everyone" electoral committee. She also ran for the Sejm in 2019 and 2023 in the Wrocław district, receiving 10,212 and 19,434 votes, respectively.

In 2024, Stożek was elected as a member to the Lower Silesian Voivodeship Sejmik and unsuccessfully ran for the European Parliament in the same year.

She assumed a seat in the Sejm on June 26, 2024, replacing Krzysztof Śmiszek, who was elected to the European Parliament.

In October 2024, she and all the other Partia Razem MPs left the Left parliamentary club.

== Personal life ==
Stożek resides in Oborniki Śląskie and is a mother of four daughters and one son. She was diagnosed with ADHD at the age of 44.
