= Paulina Matysiak =

Polish politician (born 1984)

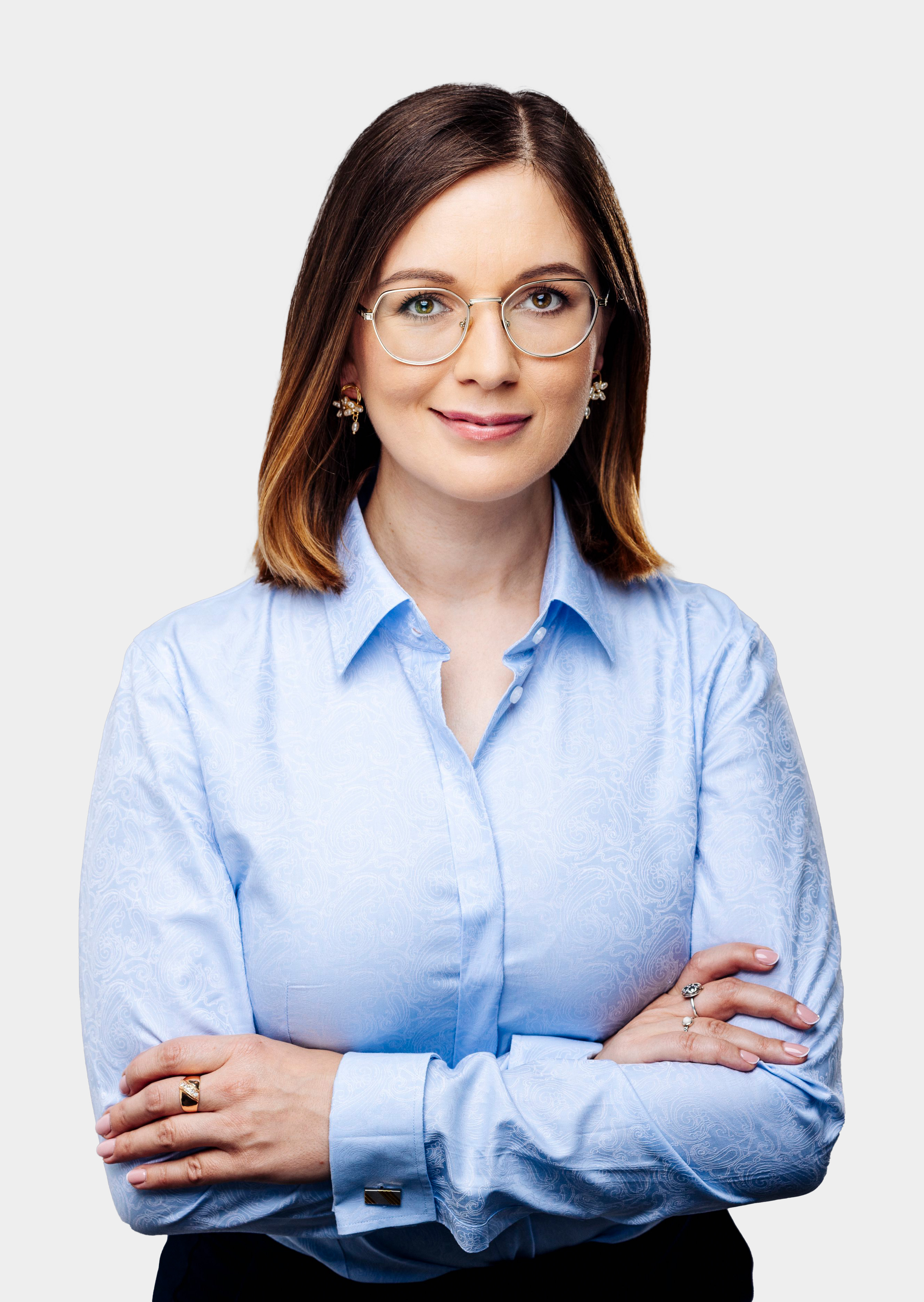

Member of the Sejm
- Incumbent
- Assumed office 12 November 2019

Personal details
- Born: 2 October 1984 (age 42) Kutno, Płock Voivodeship, Poland
- Party: Independent (since 2025); Partia Razem (2017–2025)
- Other political affiliations: The Left (2019–2024)
- Education: Nicolaus Copernicus University in Toruń
- Occupation: Politician
- Website: paulinamatysiak.pl

Paulina Matysiak ([ˈpaulina ˈmatɨɕak]; born 2 October 1984) is a politician serving as member of Sejm since 2019. She used to be a Polish local government official.

== Biography ==
Matysiak completed her MA in Polish philology at the Nicolaus Copernicus University in Toruń (2008), then her post-graduate studies in 20th century philosophy at Collegium Civitas in Warsaw (2011) and ethics at the Nicolaus Copernicus University (2015).

She runs a blog dedicated to literature, I fold corners (Zaginam Rogi), became a writer for the Wszystko Co Najważniejsze magazine, and co-authored several scientific publications, reviews, and bibliographic studies. She is a member of the Association of Polish Librarians.

== Politics ==
Matysiak joined Razem in 2017. In March 2019, she became a member of the national board of Partia Razem. In the 2019 parliamentary election, she was elected to the 9th term Sejm. Matysiak was the leading candidate on the Democratic Left Alliance list in district 11 (Sieradz).

Matysiak was subsequently re-elected in the 2023 parliamentary election.

In October 2024, she was dismissed from the Sejm Infrastructure Committee and her membership in The Left parliamentary group was suspended, due to collaborating with PiS politician Marcin Horała, in founding a joint social movement Yes for Development. The next month, after leaving The Left parliamentary group she joined the newly-founded Razem parliamentary group and became a member of the Sejm Infrastructure Committee again.

Her focus is on improving healthcare standards, wealth redistribution, gender equality and public transport.

On 12 November 2025, she was removed from Razem by its Executive Board due to not cooperating with the rest of the party. Matysiak has appealed the decision to party's National Board, unsuccessfully.

In March 2026, she admitted that she voted for right-wing Karol Nawrocki in the second round of the 2025 Polish presidential election, justifying her decision by stating her agreement with Nawrocki's stances on transportation and labor.
