= Kasia Babis =

Polish author and cartoonist (born 1992)

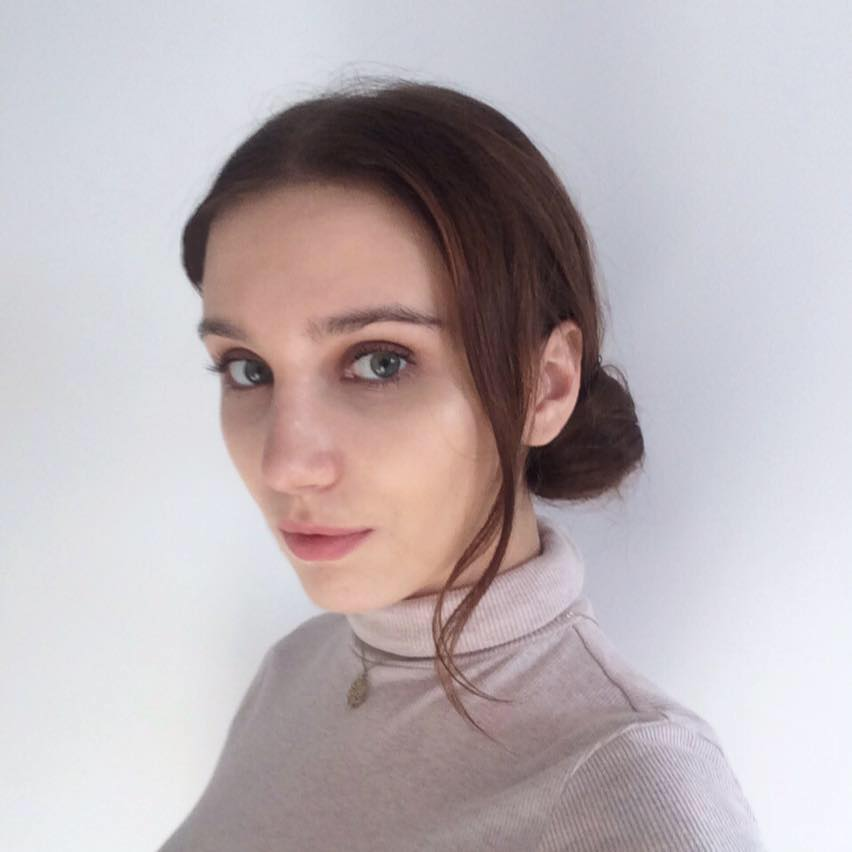
- Babis in 2017
- Born: Katarzyna Monika Babis; 20 December 1992 (age 33) Lublin, Poland
- Areas: Cartoonist, Writer, Penciller, Artist, Inker, Letterer, Colourist
- Pseudonyms: Kiciputek, Kittypat
- Notable works: Maja z Księżyca, Słoń w pokoju, Re: Constitutions

Katarzyna "Kasia" Monika Babis (born 20 December 1992) is a Polish author of comic books, cartoonist, illustrator, painter, author of children's books, YouTuber, live streamer, musician and political activist.

== Career ==
She has published webcomics in Polish on her blog Kącik Kiciputka since 2012 and in English at Kittypat Daily since 2016, initially using the pseudonyms "Kiciputek" and "Kittypat". Her debut in print was the 2014 comic book Tequila, written by Łukasz Śmigiel, notable for being one of the first successfully crowdfunded Polish comics. In the same year, the first issue of the Rag & Bones comic was published, written by Dominik Szcześniak. She has illustrated books by Katarzyna Berenika Miszczuk and Marta Kisiel-Małecka. She has also illustrated a My Little Pony: Friendship Is Magic tie-in book.

She debuted as a prose writer with the children's book Maja z Księżyca which she also illustrated, and which was nominated to the City of Warsaw Literary Award. Since 2017, she has been publishing English-language comics at The Nib. and in 2019 her cartoon was first published by The New Yorker. Her comics often consist of feminist political satire. Between 2017 and 2019 she worked on art for video games at 11 bit studios.

She contributed art to Guantánamo Voices: True Accounts from the World’s Most Infamous Prison edited by Sarah Mirk, which was named one of the Best Graphic Novels of 2020 by The New York Times, one of the 2021 Great Graphic Novels for Teens by the Young Adult Library Services Association (YALSA), awarded the 2021 Lynd Ward Graphic Novel Prize from the Penn State University Libraries and nominated to the 2021 Eisner Award for Best Anthology.

Since 2019, she worked with Macmillan Publishers illustrating the Re:Constitutions graphic novel written by Beka Feathers. According to Publishers Weekly, "this educational comics guidebook to constitutions takes on a commendable international scope", and "Helped along by Babis’s charming if somewhat overly smiley character drawings, the team goes beyond the basics to tackle more substantial examples (such as how Rwanda’s 2003 constitution required 30% of government decision-making bodies to comprise women) and urgent particulars (“the constitution is only as strong as the people who use it”)."

== Politics ==
In 2015, she joined the newly founded left-wing political party Razem. She ran in the 2015 Polish parliamentary election on Razem's Lublin candidate list. She received 631 votes. In May 2016, she was elected to Razem's National Council. In September 2016, she organized demonstrations in Lublin against the proposed legislation to ban abortion in Poland, as part of the nationwide Black Protest movement. She had left the party by 2023.

== Music ==
On 26th June of 2026 she posted her debut single titled "love witch" which she created in collaboration with compositor and music producer Radek Baranowski. She also created a music video for that song, featuring herself and Dominik Bos.

On 11th September 2026 her next single titled "Pick Me Baby" was released, created in collaboration with the music producer Radek Baranowski. On the same day, she released a music video on YouTube, starring her and the Polish live streamer Paulina Gorczyńska (nicknamed Shinii)

== Bibliography ==
- Gwiezdny wojownik. Działko, szlafrok i księżniczka (illustrator, Uroboros, 2014)
- Rag & Bones (illustrator, timof i cisi wspólnicy, 2014)
- Ostatni prezydent. Gawęda o Ryszardzie Kaczorowskim (illustrator, Muzeum Wojska w Białymstoku, 2019)
- Guantanamo Voices: True Accounts from the World’s Most Infamous Prison (co-illustrator, Abrams ComicArts, 2020)
- Dictatorship: It's Easier Than You Think! (illustrator, First Second, 2023)
- Breadcrumbs: Coming of Age in Post-Soviet Poland (writer and illustrator, 23rd St., 2025)
