= Wicha (surname) =

Wicha is a Polish surname.

- Iwona Wicha (born 1987), Polish sprinter, orienteering runner and tower running athlete
- Joanna Wicha (born 1966), Polish nurse, labor activist and politician, MP
- Marcin Wicha (1972–2025), Polish graphic designer, children's author, and essayist
- Władysław Wicha (1904–1984), Polish politician
- Simone Wicha
