= Anna Górska =

Polish politician (born 1980)

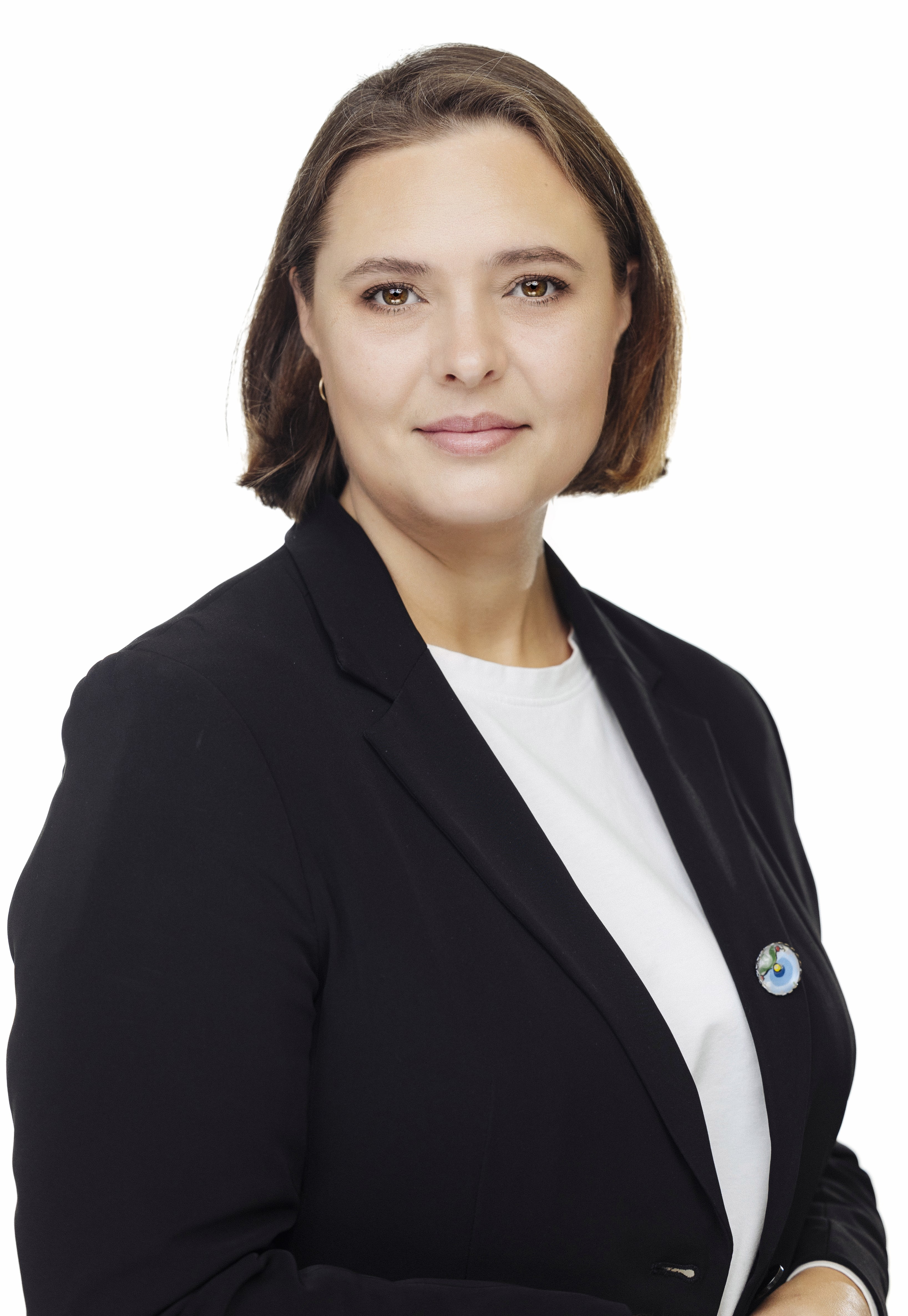

Member of the Senate
- Incumbent
- Assumed office 13 November 2023
- Constituency: 63-Chojnice

Personal details
- Born: 17 July 1980 (age 45) Elbląg, Poland
- Party: Left Together (2018-2024)

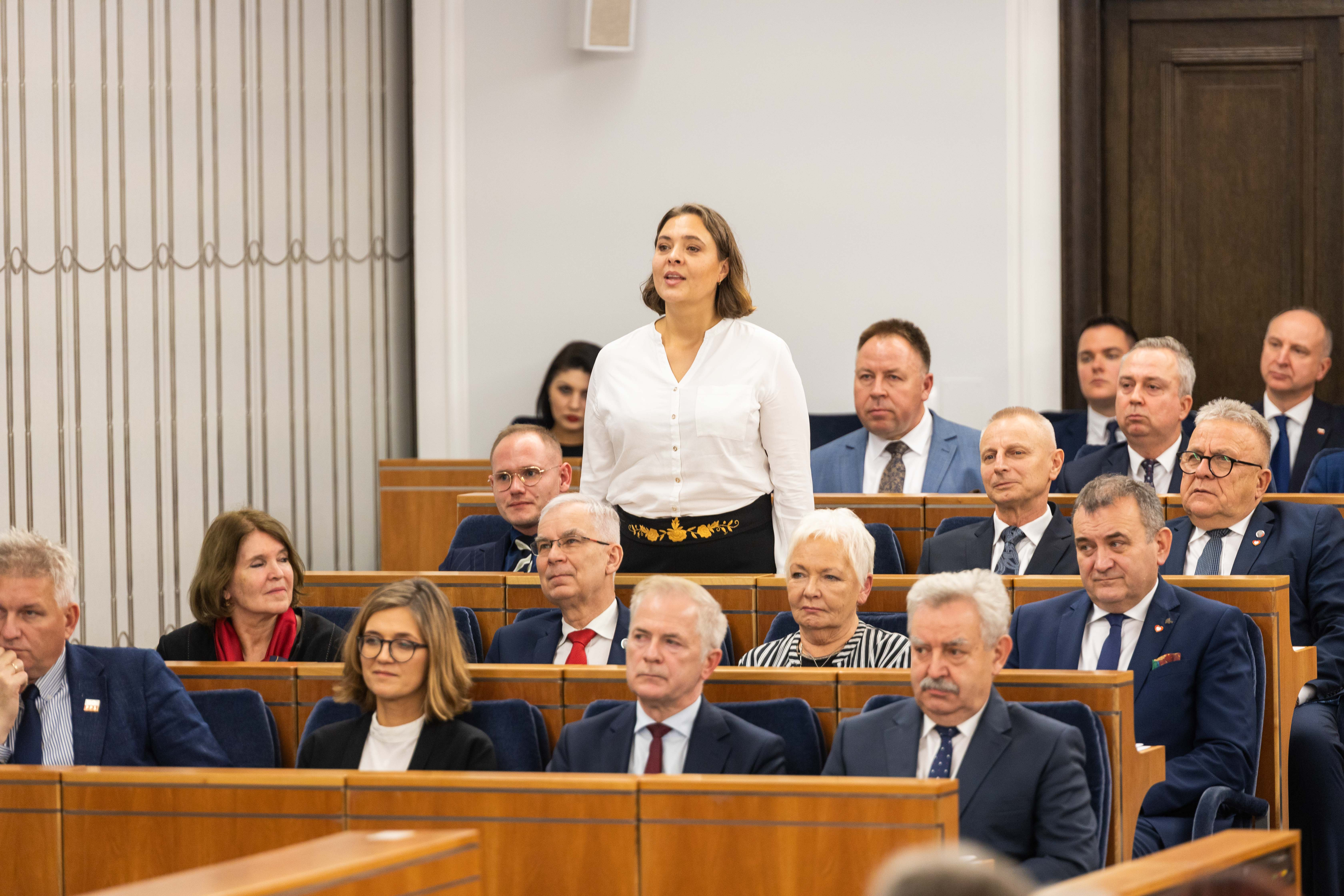
Anna Górska during her oath in the Senate

Anna Górska (née Lemańska; born 17 July 1980) is a Polish political activist, political scientist, journalist and politician. She is a senator of the 11th term.

== Early life and career ==
Górska was born as Anna Lemańska on 17 July 1980 in Elbląg, the daughter of Wiesław Lemański and Urszula Lemańska.

In the 1998 local elections, Górska unsuccessfully ran for councilor of the Gmina Papowo Biskupie on behalf of the Młodość election committee. She graduated from the Nicolaus Copernicus University in Toruń with a degree in international relations. She worked as a journalist and clerk, as well as in advertising agencies. She also started her own business in the interior decoration industry and worked in the non-governmental organization sector. She is the co-author of the book Polka. Stan na 2022.

== Political career ==
Górska later became a member of Together. She sat on the board and national council of this party (renamed Left Together). She unsuccessfully ran for a position as a councilor of the Pomeranian Voivodeship Assembly in 2018 and as an MEP in 2019.

In the 2023 parliamentary elections, she was elected to the Senate of the 11th term. She ran as a candidate for the New Left (as part of the Senate pact) in district no. 63, receiving 89,216 votes and defeating, among others, the incumbent Pomeranian Voivode, Dariusz Drelich.

== Personal life ==
Górska is married, has a daughter and a disabled son. She resides in Straszyn. After the judgment of the Constitutional Tribunal in October 2020, during the protests between 2020 and 2021, she announced that she had undergone an abortion due to the threat to her life.
