= Joanna Wicha =

Polish politician

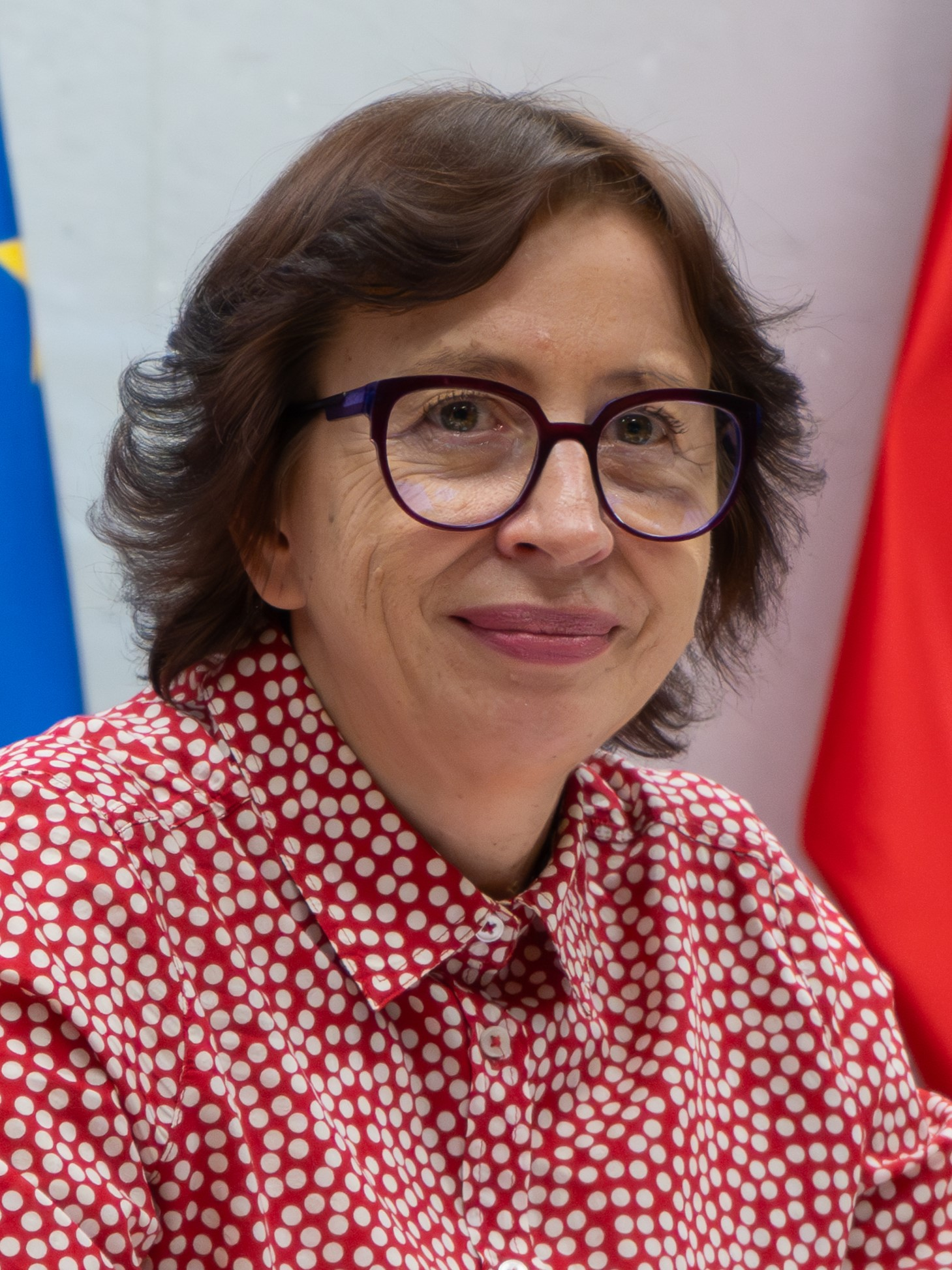
- Wicha in 2025

Member of the Sejm
- Incumbent
- Assumed office 13 November 2023
- Parliamentary group: The Left
- Constituency: 20 (Warsaw II)

Personal details
- Born: Joanna Beata Wicha; 9 October 1966 (age 59) Biała Podlaska, Poland
- Party: Partia Razem (2015–2024)
- Education: University of Warsaw
- Profession: Nurse

Joanna Beata Wicha (born 9 October 1966) is a Polish nurse, labor activist and politician, elected member of the Sejm in 2023.

Wicha assumed her seat on 13 November 2023 and currently is a member of the standing committees for health, elder care policy and national defense. She is affiliated with The Left parliamentary group.

== Biography ==
Wicha was born in Biała Podlaska on 9 October 1966. She has graduated from a medical school in 1986, specializing in nursing, and went on to achieve a master's degree in sociology at the University of Warsaw. She has been a nurse for over 37 years and has recently worked in children hospital in Warsaw. Since 1996 she is an active trade unionist. She is a member of the Polish National Trade Union of Nurses and Midwives.

=== Political career ===
In 2015 she joined the newly established Partia Razem party, and was a member of the party's national council. In October 2024, she left Razem, while remaining in The Left as an MP.

Election results
Election	Body	Committee	Votes (%)	Constituency	Elected?	Ref.
2018	Warsaw City Council	KWW Jan Śpiewak – Wygra Warszawa	247 (0.26%)	Śródmieście and Ochota	No	
2019	European Parliament	Left Together	482 (0.03%)	Warsaw	No	
2019	Sejm	The Left	2,919 (0.21%)	Warsaw I	No	
2023	Sejm	The Left	15,324 (2.10%)	Warsaw II	Yes	

== Political views ==
Wicha advocates for women's right for abortion until twelfth week of pregnancy and speaks unfavorably about the Constitutional Tribunal ruling from October 2020 that tightened abortion law in Poland.

She also stands for public funding of in-vitro fertilisation and spoke in favor of the idea at the Sejm meeting on 22 November 2023 during the first reading of a citizens' amendment proposal of the Act on publicly funded healthcare treatments, which would include IVF refunding.

Wicha is an outspoken supporter for increased healthcare services and education public spending.
