= Marcelina Zawisza =

Polish activist and politician

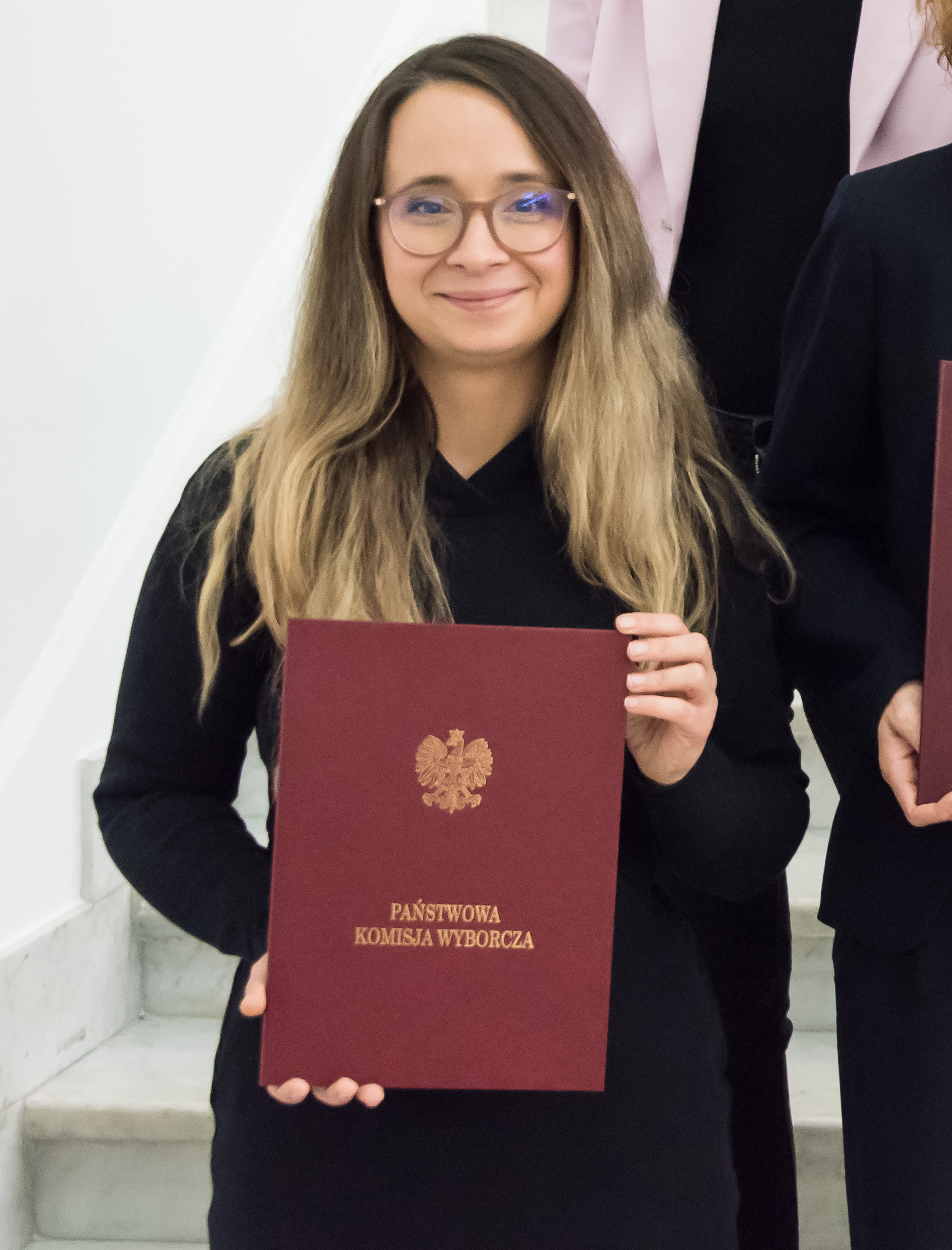
- Zawisza holding her PKW certificate of election, 2023

Member of the Sejm
- Incumbent
- Assumed office 12 November 2019
- Constituency: 21-Opole

Personal details
- Born: Marcelina Monika Zawisza; 3 May 1989 (age 37) Katowice, Poland
- Party: Partia Razem
- Other political affiliations: The Greens (until 2015)
- Children: 1
- Education: Warsaw University
- Occupation: Politician

Marcelina Monika Zawisza (Polish pronunciation: [ˈmart͡sɛlina mɔnika ˈzaviʂa]; born 3 May 1989) is a Polish activist and left-wing politician. She is a member of the National Board of the Partia Razem political party. She has served as a member of Sejm since 2019.

== Early life and education ==
Zawisza was born on 3 May 1989 in Katowice to a family of Silesian miners who were members of a trade union. She studied at the Institute of Social Policy of Warsaw University where she completed a bachelor's degree (licencjat).

== Political career ==
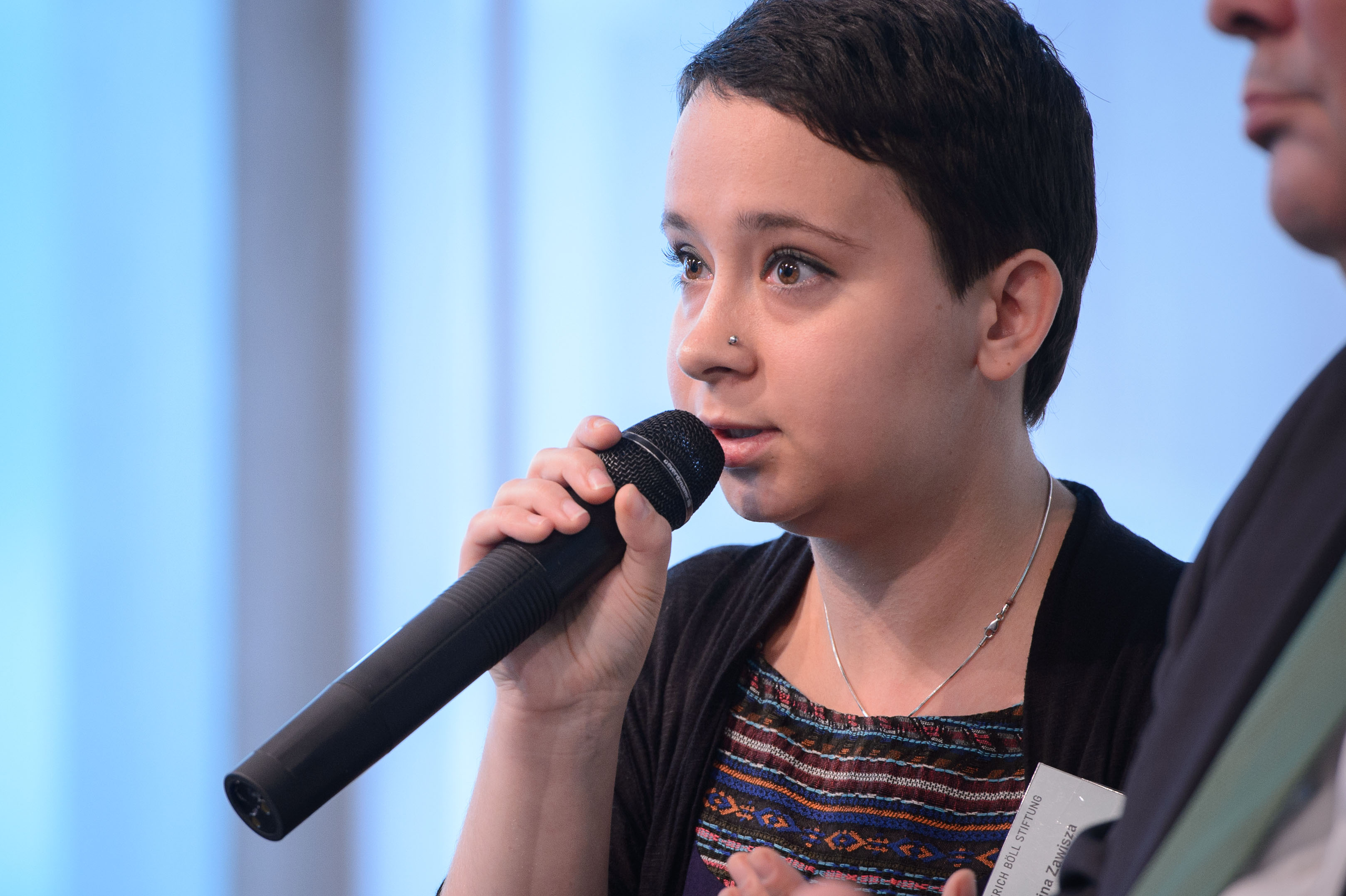
Zawisza in 2013

She was a member of The Greens and of Young Socialists. She ran in the 2014 European Parliament election on the Greens' list and was the chief of staff of Joanna Erbel, the Green candidate for mayor of Warsaw in the local government election. In 2015 she left the Greens and became one of the founding members of the new political party Partia Razem. Since the party's foundation in May 2015 she has been a member of the National Board of Razem.

In the 2015 parliamentary election, she ran as the first candidate on Razem's list in the Katowice electoral district. She received 8316 votes, but her party won only 3.62 percent of votes, so did not gain any seats in the Sejm.

In January 2018, Forbes magazine included Zawisza on its annual European Forbes 30 Under 30 list in the "Law & Policy" category for her role as a co-founder of Razem, which organized the Black Protest against a total ban on abortion in Poland.

Zawisza was elected to the Sejm on 13 October 2019, receiving 19,206 votes in the Opole district, campaigning from The Left list.

In the 2023 parliamentary election she was re-elected. Zawisza received 182 more votes than in the previous parliamentary election.
