= United Left (Poland) =

United Left Zjednoczona Lewica
- Leader: Barbara Nowacka
- Founded: July 2015
- Dissolved: February 2016
- Preceded by: Left and Democrats
- Succeeded by: The Left
- Ideology: Social democracy
- Political position: Centre-left
- Members: Democratic Left Alliance (SLD); Your Movement (TR); Polish Socialist Party (PPS); Labour Union (UP); The Greens (Zieloni); Polish Labour Party (PPP); Social Democracy of Poland (SDPL); National Party of Retirees and Pensioners (KPEiR); Alliance of Democrats (SD); Democratic Party (PD)

Website
- zjednoczona-lewica.pl (archived)

The United Left (Polish: Zjednoczona Lewica, ZL) was a political and electoral alliance of political parties in Poland.

The alliance was formed in July 2015 by the Democratic Left Alliance (SLD), Your Movement (TR), Polish Socialist Party (PPS), Labour Union (UP), and The Greens (PZ) to jointly contest the forthcoming parliamentary election. The formation of the alliance was in response to the poor performance the Polish centre-left in the 2015 presidential election, and was backed by the All-Poland Alliance of Trade Unions (OPZZ). On 14 September 2015 the Polish Labour Party (PPP) joined the alliance. The Social Democracy of Poland, National Party of Retirees and Pensioners, Alliance of Democrats and Democratic Party also had its candidates on the lists of ZL. On 4 October 2015, it was announced that Barbara Nowacka, co-leader of TR, would be the alliance's leader and prime ministerial candidate.

In the 2015 parliamentary election on 25 October 2015, the ZL received 7.6% of the vote, below the 8% electoral threshold for electoral alliances (individual parties only need 5%), leaving the alliance without any parliamentary representation. ZL was dissolved in February 2016. The alliance was succeeded for the 2019 parliamentary election by The Left.
