= Barbara Nowacka =

Polish politician (born 1975)

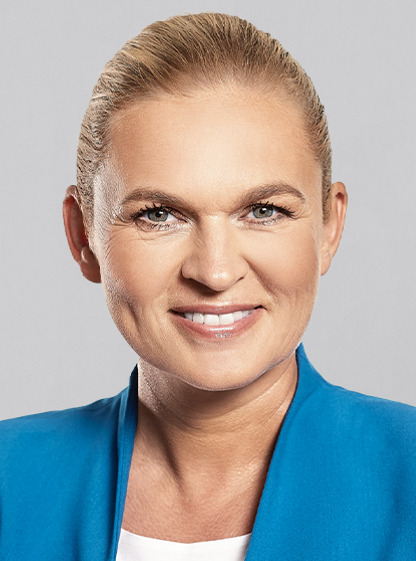
- Official portrait, 2023

Minister of National Education
- Incumbent
- Assumed office 13 December 2023
- Prime Minister: Donald Tusk
- Preceded by: Krzysztof Szczucki

Member of the Sejm
- Incumbent
- Assumed office 12 November 2019
- Constituency: Słupsk

Leader of Polish Initiative
- In office 20 February 2016 – 15 November 2025
- Preceded by: office established
- Succeeded by: office abolished

Personal details
- Born: 10 May 1975 (age 50) Warsaw, Poland
- Party: Civic Coalition (since 2025); Polish Initiative (2016–2025); Your Movement (2014–2016); Union of the Left (2005–2006); Labour Union (2001–2005)
- Other political affiliations: Civic Coalition (since 2019); United Left (2015–2016); Europa Plus (2013–2014)
- Domestic partner: Maciej
- Children: 2
- Parent(s): Jerzy Paweł Nowacki; Izabela Jaruga-Nowacka

Barbara Anna Nowacka (born 10 May 1975) is a Polish politician who has served as Minister of National Education since December 2023. In October 2015 she became leader of the United Left coalition for the 2015 Polish parliamentary election, bringing together Labour Union, Your Movement, the Democratic Left Alliance, the Greens, and the Polish Socialist Party. Nowacka is the daughter of the late Deputy Prime Minister and Minister of Social Policy Izabela Jaruga-Nowacka. Since 2016 she has been the leader of the Polish Initiative.

== Biography ==
Born in Warsaw, the daughter of Jerzy Nowacki, a rector at the Polish-Japanese Academy of Information Technology, and Izabela Jaruga-Nowacka, a former Deputy Prime Minister and Minister of Social Policy under Marek Belka's Cabinet. Her mother was listed on the flight manifest of the Tupolev Tu-154 of the 36th Special Aviation Regiment carrying the President of Poland Lech Kaczyński which crashed near Smolensk-North airport near Pechersk near Smolensk, Russia, on 10 April 2010, killing all aboard.

Nowacka was educated at the University of Warsaw, where she was active as a feminist in the Federation for Women and Family Planning. From 1997 to 2006, she was a member of the youth wing of Labour United and then of the party itself. In 2014 she stood unsuccessfully in the European elections in Lublin for Europa Plus, supported by Aleksander Kwaśniewski. She went on from that defeat to join Janusz Palikot's Your Movement, becoming a joint leader, and helped to create the United Left, a broad coalition. On 4 October 2015 she was named as its candidate for prime minister if it won the election, and on 17 October she presented the coalition's programme at a conference in Katowice. However, in the elections on 25 October the United Left failed to reach the 8 per cent threshold for obtaining parliamentary representation under Poland's system of election, while Nowacka herself failed to be elected in the Warsaw I parliamentary constituency.

The Polish elections of 2015 were unusual in that most of the major parties contesting them were led by women. While Nowacka was the leader of the United Left, Ewa Kopacz of the governing Civic Platform party was the incumbent prime minister, and Beata Szydło of the opposition Law and Justice party was the main challenger. In the event, Szydło was elected with an overall majority.

In 2016, Foreign Policy magazine included Nowacka, together with Agnieszka Dziemianowicz-Bąk of Razem, on its annual list of the 100 most influential global thinkers for their role in organizing protests against a total ban on abortion in Poland.

In June 2019, Nowacka became leader of the political party Polish Initiative (iPL), which she originally founded as an association in 2016. She is currently standing for election in Constituency No. 26 (Słupsk) as a candidate for the Civic Coalition, of which iPL is a member party.

Nowacka has been fiercely critical of the influence that the Catholic Church has in Polish politics. When in October 2020 the Polish parliament considered placing stricter enforcement on abortion, Nowacka claimed that the Catholic bishops of Poland, the majority of whom strongly support such legislation, had "blood on their hands". She later attended a protest against the new abortion restrictions, where she was tear-gassed by a police officer after approaching him and showing her ID card.

On 13 December 2023, she was appointed as the Minister of National Education by Donald Tusk.

== Views and positions ==
Barbara Nowacka declares herself as atheist. She is a supporter of the right to abortion, as well as the state financing in vitro fertilization for single women. She also focuses on LGBT rights and is in favor of granting same-sex couples the right to adopt children. She sees the causes of racist attitudes and xenophobic prejudices in social inequalities.

== Controversies ==
As Minister of National Education, Barbara Nowacka has introduced many changes deemed controversial, especially by historians and conservatives. The curriculum in Polish schools was drastically changed; The cursed soldiers, historical personalities such as Witold Pilecki, Maximilian Kolbe and events such as the Greater Poland Uprising have been removed from the curriculum in Nowacka's reform.

More controversially, any mentions of the Wola massacre and the Volhynia massacre have also been removed from the textbooks and curriculum, leading to accusations of political revisionism. Subjects such as human rights, the EU and the UN have instead received more space in the new curriculum.

Minister Nowacka denied the accusation of removing those figures and events from schools, as they were just moved from primary to high school.

On 27 January 2025, Nowacka held a speech at the 80th anniversary of the liberation of Auschwitz Death Camp. While reading from a script, she said that "under German occupation, Polish Nazis built concentration camps." This has led to an outcry within the Polish opposition and calls for her resignation. Minister Nowacka and PM Tusk claim it was a "slip of the tongue."
