= Opinion polling for the 2024 Polish local elections =

In the run up to the 2024 Polish local elections, various organisations carried out opinion polling to gauge voting intention in Poland. Results of such polls are displayed in this article. The date range for these opinion polls are from the 2023 Polish parliamentary election, held on 15 October, to the day of the next local election.

== Voivodeship Sejmiks ==
Poll results are listed in the tables below in reverse chronological order, showing the most recent first, and using the date the survey's fieldwork was done, as opposed to the date of publication. If such date is unknown, the date of publication is given instead. The highest percentage figure in each polling survey is displayed in bold, and the background shaded in the leading party's colour. In the instance that there is a tie, then no figure is shaded. The lead column on the right shows the percentage-point difference between the two parties with the highest figures. When a specific poll does not show a data figure for a party, the party's cell corresponding to that poll is shown empty.

=== 2024 ===
| Polling firm/Link | Fieldwork date | Sample size | United Right | Civic Coalition | Third Way | | The Left | Nonpartisan Local Government Activists | Confederation | Others | Don't know | Lead |
| Polling firm/Link | Fieldwork date | Sample size | United Right | Civic Coalition | Polish Coalition | Poland 2050 | The Left | Nonpartisan Local Government Activists | Confederation | Others | Don't know | Lead |
|---|---|---|---|---|---|---|---|---|---|---|---|---|
| IPSOS | 7 Apr | | **33.7** | 31.9 | 13.5 | | 6.8 | 2.7 | 7.5 | 3.9 | | 1.8 |
| ewybory.eu | 15 Mar – 4 Apr | 9,606 | 29.1 | **31.1** | 16.6 | | 8.3 | 4.1 | 7.5 | 3.3 | | 2.0 |
| IBSP / Stan Polityki | 3–5 Apr | 1000 | 29.75 | **30.98** | 14.91 | | 5.14 | 6.65 | 8.82 | 3.75 | | 1.23 |
| IBRiS / "Wydarzenia" Polsat | 3–4 Apr | 1,000 | **26.3** | 26.2 | 9.9 | | 9.3 | 4.4 | 8.4 | 4.7 | 10.8 | 0.1 |
| IPSOS / OKO.press, TOK FM | 2–4 Apr | 1,000 | **29** | 25 | 11 | | 7 | 7 | 10 | 2 | 9 | 4 |
| Opinia24 / TVN | 2-3 Apr | 1,001 | 28 | **29** | 11 | | 7 | 4 | 8 | 9 | 4 | 1 |
| United Surveys / WP.pl | 22–23 Mar | 1,000 | **29.4** | 27.4 | 10.5 | | 8.4 | 4.5 | 7.5 | 2.8 | 9.5 | 2.0 |
| CBOS | 18–22 Mar | 1,000 | 19 | **22** | 9 | | 6 | 8 | 11 | 3 | 22 | 3 |
| United Surveys / WP.pl | 18 Mar | 1,000 | **29.8** | 28.1 | 7.9 | | 7.8 | 3.7 | 8.5 | 3.2 | 11.0 | 1.7 |
| United Surveys / WP.pl | 8–10 Mar | 1,000 | **29.0** | 28.0 | 13.5 | | 7.6 | | 8.6 | 4.9 | 8.4 | 1.0 |
| IBRiS / "RZ" | 23–25 Feb | 1,000 | 30.2 | **30.6** | 17.2 | | 8.5 | | 7.6 | 1.7 | 4.2 | 0.4 |
| Local elections | 21 Oct 2018 | 16,534,085 (Note: Turnout: 54.90%) | **34.13** | 28.12 (Note: Combined results of Platform.Modern Civic Coalition and The Greens) | 12.07 | – | 8.19 (Note: Combined results of SLD Left Together and Together) | 5.28 | 2.85 (Note: Combined results of Liberty in Local Governments and National Movement) | 9.36 | | 11.64 |

== Gmina Councils ==
=== Kraków ===
| Polling firm/Link | Fieldwork date | Sample size | Civic Kraków | | | | | Together for Kraków | United Right | Kraków for Citizens | Confederation | Others | Don't know | Lead |
| Polling firm/Link | Fieldwork date | Sample size | Majchrowski's Committee | Civic Coalition | Poland 2050 | Polish Coalition | New Left | Together for Kraków | United Right | Kraków for Citizens | Confederation | Others | Don't know | Lead |
|---|---|---|---|---|---|---|---|---|---|---|---|---|---|---|
| IBR & IBRiS | 16 June 2023 (Note: Publication date) | 660 | 5 | 22 | 6 | | 7 | – | 23 | 23 | 3 | 1.5 | 8 | Tie |
| IBRiS / Alpaka Innovations | 21 Oct 2022 | 664 | 10 | 21 | 11 | 1 | 8 | – | 19 | 17 | 6 | 2.1 | 6 | 2 |
| Dobra Opinia / LoveKraków.pl | 7-10 Sep 2022 | 500 | 15.6 | 11.0 | 8.8 | – | – | 3.2 | 22.8 | 34.4 | 2.6 | 1.6 | – | 11.6 |
| Local elections | 21 Oct 2018 | 329,661 (Note: Turnout: 56.79%) | 43.65 | | | | | 3.11 | 29.82 | 12.73 | 3.04 | 7.66 | – | 9.82 |

=== Wrocław ===
| Polling firm/Link | Fieldwork date | Sample size | Civic Coalition | Law and Justice | The Left | Third Way | Confederation | Nonpartisan Local Government Activists | Others | Don't know | Lead |
|---|---|---|---|---|---|---|---|---|---|---|---|
| Opinia24 | 8–12 Dec 2023 | 500 | 31 | 21 | 15 | 9 | 8 | 4 | – | 2 | 10 |
| Local elections | 21 Oct 2018 | 255,133 (Note: Turnout: 52.83%) | 37.62 | 26.55 | – | – | – | – | 42.13 | – | 7.43 |

== Mayors ==
=== Kraków ===
==== First round ====
| Polling firm/Link | Fieldwork date | Sample size | Andrzej Kulig Friendly Kraków | Łukasz Kmita PiS | Małgorzata Wassermann PiS | Łukasz Gibała Kraków for Citizens | Konrad Berkowicz Confederation | Aleksander Miszalski KO | Rafał Komarewicz PL2050 | Stanisław Mazur Better Kraków | Others | Don't know | Lead |
|---|---|---|---|---|---|---|---|---|---|---|---|---|---|
| ewybory.eu | 23 Mar - 3 Apr 2024 | 800 | 9.1 | 21.3 | | 30.0 | 5.4 | 27.9 | 5.4 | | 1.0 | | 2.1 |
| Opinia24 | 11–15 Jan 2024 | 520 | 7 | – | 17 | 33 | 5 | 26 | – | 4 | 1 | 7 | 7 |
| Opinia24 | 8–12 Jan 2024 | 1,000 | 5 | – | 18 | 35 | 6 | 19 | 8 | 5 | 2 | 2 | 16 |
| Local elections | 21 Oct 2018 | 337,781 (Note: Turnout: 58.19%) | 45.84 | 31.88 | | 17.14 | 2.50 | – | – | – | 2.63 | – | 13.96 |

==== Second round ====
| Polling firm/Link | Fieldwork date | Sample size | Łukasz Gibała Kraków for Citizens | Aleksander Miszalski KO | Don't know | Lead |
|---|---|---|---|---|---|---|
| Opinia24 | 8–12 Jan 2024 | 1,000 | 58 | 37 | 5 | 21 |

=== Poznań ===
==== First round ====
| Polling firm/Link | Fieldwork date | Sample size | Jacek Jaśkowiak KO | Bartłomiej Wróblewski PiS | Beata Urbańska Lewica | Dorota Bonk-Hammermeister Common Poznań | Ewa Schädler PL2050 | Piotr Tuczyński Confederation | Others | Don't know | Lead |
|---|---|---|---|---|---|---|---|---|---|---|---|
| IBRiS / "Rz" | 29 Nov–1 Dec 2023 | 1,000 | 43.1 | 15.0 | 8.6 | 7.2 | 9.5 | 2.2 | – | 14.3 | 28.1 |
| Local elections | 21 Oct 2018 | 227,036 (Note: Turnout: 56.63%) | 55.99 | 21.31 | 7.66 | 3.51 | – | – | 11.53 | – | 36.68 |

==== Second round ====
| Polling firm/Link | Fieldwork date | Sample size | Jacek Jaśkowiak KO | Bartłomiej Wróblewski PiS | Wouldn't vote | Don't know | Lead |
|---|---|---|---|---|---|---|---|
| IBRiS / "Rz" | 29 Nov–1 Dec 2023 | 1,000 | 70.4 | 20.6 | 3.6 | 5.4 | 49.8 |

=== Wrocław ===
==== First round ====
| Polling firm/Link | Fieldwork date | Sample size | Jacek Sutryk Independent | Mirosława Stachowiak-Różecka PiS | Robert Suligowski The Greens | Michał Jaros KO | Krzysztof Maj BS | Robert Grzechnik Confederation | Others/don't know | Refused to answer | Lead |
|---|---|---|---|---|---|---|---|---|---|---|---|
| SW Research | 28 Dec 2023–4 Jan 2024 | 1,000 | 34 | 16 | 2 | 15 | 4 | 1 | 18 | 10 | 18 |
| Opinia24 / "Rz" | 27 Nov–1 Dec 2023 | 1,010 | 39 | 20 | – | 16 | 4 | 1 | 21 | – | 19 |
| Local elections | 21 Oct 2018 | 258,297 (Note: Turnout: 53.48%) | 50.20 | 27.50 | 1.35 | – | – | – | 20.95 | – | 22.70 |

| Polling firm/Link | Fieldwork date | Sample size | Jacek Sutryk Independent | Paweł Hreniak PiS | Michał Jaros KO | Krzysztof Śmiszek Lewica | Izabela Bodnar PL2050 | Krzysztof Tuduj Confederation | Krzysztof Maj BS | Others | Don't know | Lead |
|---|---|---|---|---|---|---|---|---|---|---|---|---|
| Opinia24 | 8–12 Dec 2023 | 500 | 26 | 17 | 18 | 14 | 7 | 7 | 4 | – | 8 | 8 |
| Local elections | 21 Oct 2018 | 258,297 (Note: Turnout: 53.48%) | 50.20 | 27.50 | – | – | – | – | – | 22.30 | – | 22.70 |

==== Second round ====
| Polling firm/Link | Fieldwork date | Sample size | Jacek Sutryk Independent | Michał Jaros KO | Don't know | Lead |
|---|---|---|---|---|---|---|
| Opinia24 | 8–12 Dec 2023 | 500 | 49 | 44 | 7 | 5 |

| Polling firm/Link | Fieldwork date | Sample size | Jacek Sutryk Independent | Agnieszka Dziemianowicz-Bąk Lewica | Don't know | Lead |
|---|---|---|---|---|---|---|
| Opinia24 | 8–12 Dec 2023 | 500 | 54 | 37 | 9 | 17 |

| Polling firm/Link | Fieldwork date | Sample size | Jacek Sutryk Independent | Michał Kobosko PL2050 | Don't know | Lead |
|---|---|---|---|---|---|---|
| Opinia24 | 8–12 Dec 2023 | 500 | 57 | 35 | 8 | 22 |
