= 2024 Kraków mayoral election =

- City president
- 7 April 2024 (first round); 21 April 2024 (second round)
- Turnout: 51.79% (first round); 45.50% (second round)
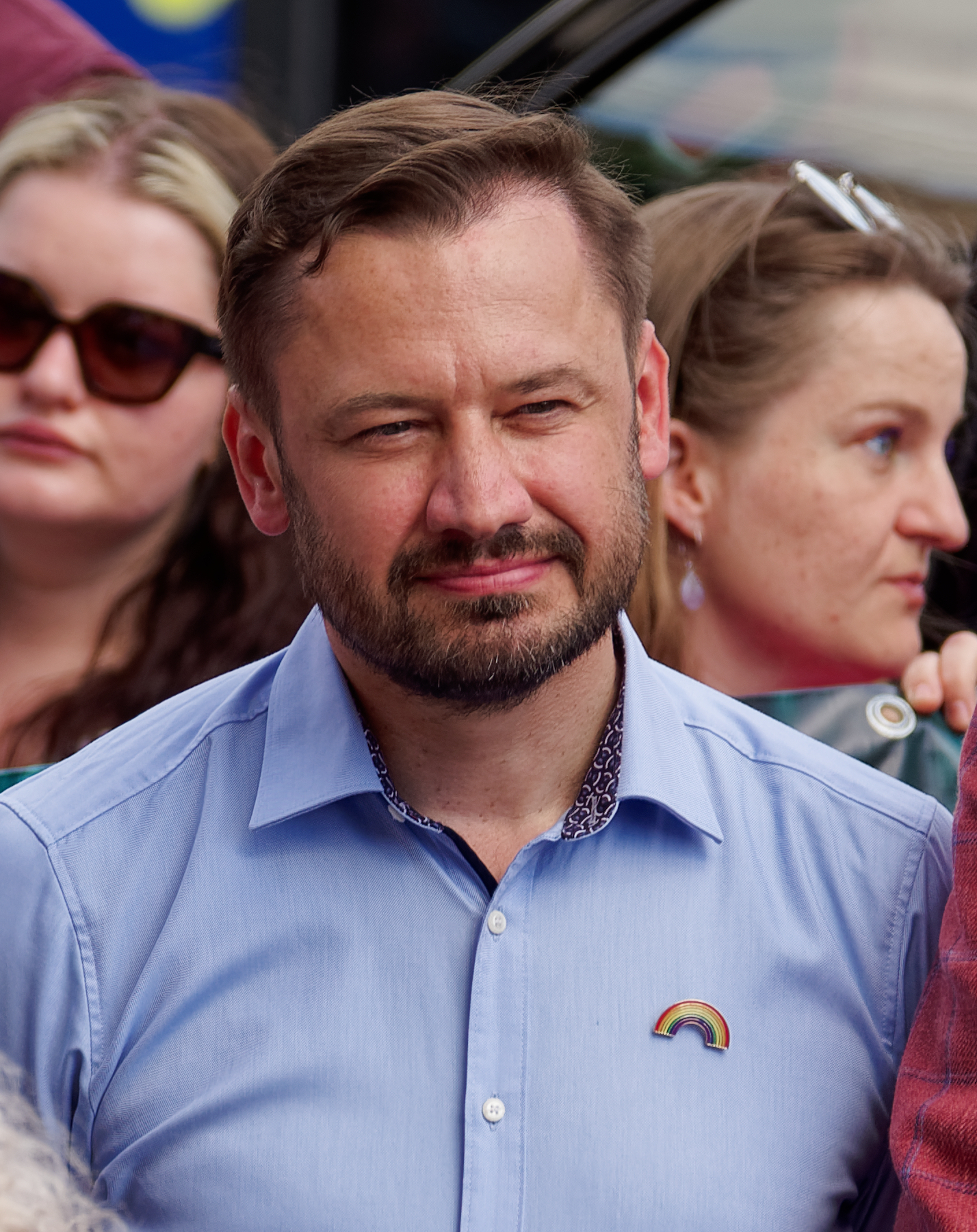

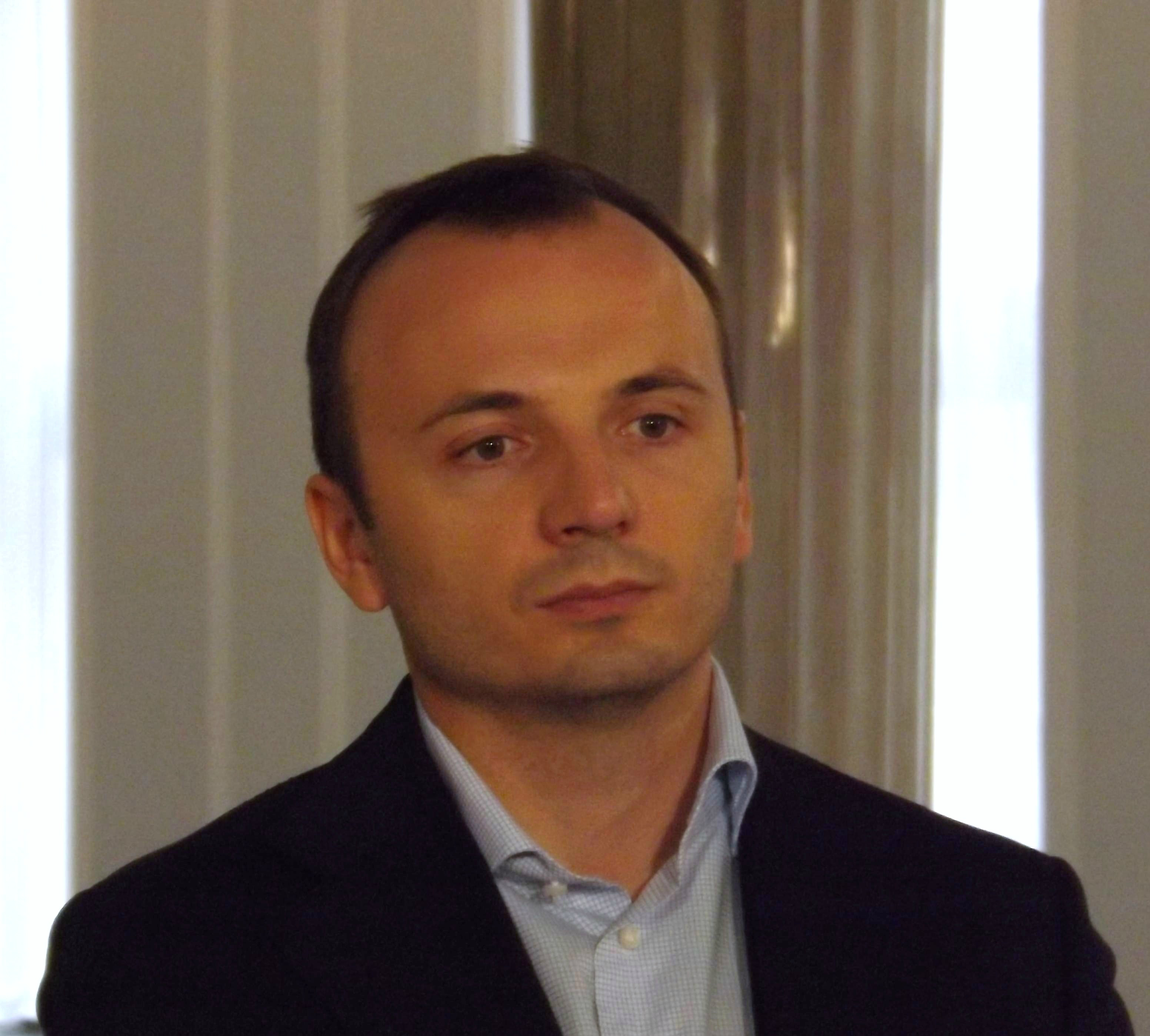
Candidate	Aleksander Miszalski	Łukasz Gibała
Party	Civic Platform	Independent (Note: Independent candidate supported and backed by Kraków for Residents.)
Popular vote	133,703	128,269
Percentage	51.04%	48.96%
- City council
- 7 April 2024
- All 43 seats in the Kraków City Council; 22 seats needed for a majority
- Turnout: 51.79%
Party	Vote %	Seats	+/–
KO	40.11	24	+1
PiS	23.20	12	−4
KdM	15.56	7	+3
This lists parties that won seats. See the complete results below.
President before	President after
Jacek Majchrowski; Independent	Aleksander Miszalski; Civic Platform

The 2024 Kraków mayoral election was held on 7 April 2024 in Kraków with a runoff on 21 April as part of the 2024 Polish local elections. Aleksander Miszalski narrowly defeated Łukasz Gibała in the runoff by a margin of 5,434 votes.

== Opinion polls ==
=== First round ===
Graphical summary of opinion polls: Aleksander Miszalski Łukasz Gibała Łukasz Kmita Andrzej Kulig Konrad Berkowicz Rafał Komarewicz ~~Stanisław Mazur~~

Polling firm/Link	Fieldwork date	Sample size	Miszalski PO	Gibała Ind. (KdM)	Kmita PiS	Kulig Ind.	Berkowicz KWiN	Komarewicz PL2050	Hareńczyk Ind.	Others	Don't know	Lead
2024 Kraków mayoral election	Election result	297,089	37.21	26.79	19.79	7.18	5.00	3.07	0.95			10.42
Ipsos (exit poll) / TVP, TVN24, Polsat News	7 April 2024		39.4	28.4	14.7	8.3	5.6	2.5	1.1			11.0
BBS"O"	22–24 Mar 2024	2,000	15.5	24.7	13.5	14.1	5.6	4.8	1.5	6.5 (Note: Mazur — 4.7, Muzyk — 1.8)	13.9	9.2
Opinia24 / KKW KO	26–28 Feb 2024	800	17	31	13	5	4	6		7 (Note: Mazur — 6, Bąk — 1)	15	14
OGB / LoveKraków.pl	21–28 Feb 2024	1,000	16.11	33.86	10.07	4.31	2.86	3.49		4.37 (Note: Mazur)	24.93	17.75
Opinia24 / KdM	5–8 Feb 2024	1,000	19	38	12	6	9	8		7 (Note: Others — 1, Mazur — 6)	1	19
SW Research / Lepszy Kraków	27 Jan – 6 Feb 2024	1,013	11.2	27.8	15.8	13.7				14.8 (Note: Mazur)	16.7	12.0
SW Research / Lepszy Kraków	2024	500	15.4	32.6	13.6	12.0				14.4 (Note: Mazur)	12.0	17.2
BBS"O"	17–21 Jan 2024	1,000	11.41	27.10	18.21	18.33	7.69			17.26 (Note: Others/don't know — 12.20, Mazur — 5.06)		8.77
Opinia24	11–15 Jan 2024	520	26	33		7	5			21 (Note: Wassermann (PiS) — 17, Mazur — 4)	7	7
Opinia24	8–12 Jan 2024	1,000	19	35		5	6	8		23 (Note: Wassermann (PiS) — 18, Mazur — 5)		16
IBRiS / Rz	10–11 Jan 2024	1,000	12.0	25.9		16.0				28.5 (Note: Wassermann (PiS) — 22.8, Mazur — 5.7)	17.6	3.1
IBRiS / AI	2022		13	24			4	10		36 (Note: Wassermann (PiS) — 20, Majchrowski — 16, Urynowicz (PJG) — 4, Mazur — 2)	8	4

=== Second round ===
Polling firm/Link	Fieldwork date	Sample size	Miszalski PO	Gibała Ind. (KdM)	Others	Don't know	Abstain	Lead
2024 Kraków mayoral election	Election result	261,972	51.04	48.96				2.08
Ipsos (exit poll) / TVP, TVN24, Polsat News	21 April 2024		51.1	48.9				2.2
Opinia24 / "GW"	15–17 Apr 2024	500	39	36		25		3
Ipsos / KKW KO	9–10 Apr 2024	1,000	48	43		8		5
OGB / LoveKraków.pl	21–28 Feb 2024	1,000	28.90	49.79				20.89
OGB / LoveKraków.pl	21–28 Feb 2024	1,000		63.85	13.93 (Note: Kmita (PiS))	22.19		49.92
Opinia24 / KdM	5–8 Feb 2024	1,000	33	64		3		31
Opinia24 / KdM	5–8 Feb 2024	1,000		82	16 (Note: Kmita (PiS))	2		66
Opinia24	8–12 Jan 2024	1,000	37	58		5		21
IBRiS / AI	2022			60	22 (Note: Wassermann (PiS))			38

== Results ==
=== City president ===
Candidate	Party	First round		Second round	
Candidate	Party	Votes	%	Votes	%
Aleksander Miszalski	Civic Coalition (PO)	110,556	37.21	133,703	51.04
Łukasz Gibała	Committee of Łukasz Gibała – Kraków for Residents (Independent)	79,580	26.79	128,269	48.96
Łukasz Kmita	Law and Justice	58,795	19.79		
Andrzej Kulig	Committee of Andrzej Kulig "Towards the Future" (Independent)	21,341	7.18		
Konrad Berkowicz	Confederation and Nonpartisan Localists (NN)	14,854	5.00		
Rafał Komarewicz	Committee of Rafał Komarewicz Kraków Third Way (Poland 2050)	9,126	3.07		
Adam Hareńczyk	United for Kraków (Independent)	2,837	0.95		
Total		297,089	100.00	261,972	100.00
Valid votes		297,089	99.13	261,972	99.14
Invalid/blank votes		2,599	0.87	2,285	0.86
Total votes		299,688	100.00	264,257	100.00
Registered voters/turnout		578,674	51.79	580,771	45.50
Source: National Electoral Commission

=== City council ===
Party	Votes	%	+/–	Seats	+/–
Civic Coalition	118,641	40.11	−3.54	24	+1
Law and Justice	68,615	23.20	−6.62	12	−4
Committee of Łukasz Gibała – Kraków for Residents	46,012	15.56	+2.83	7	+3
Committee of Rafał Komarewicz Kraków Third Way	18,430	6.23	New	0	New
Confederation and Nonpartisan Localists	17,753	6.00	+2.96	0	0
Committee of Andrzej Kulig "Towards the Future"	14,264	4.82	New	0	New
Committee of Stanisław Mazur	7,105	2.40	New	0	New
United for Kraków	3,487	1.18	New	0	New
Self-Governing Kraków	1,467	0.50	New	0	New
Total	295,774	100.00	–	43	0
Valid votes	295,774	98.71			
Invalid/blank votes	3,878	1.29			
Total votes	299,652	100.00			
Registered voters/turnout	578,552	51.79			
Source: National Electoral Commission

== Aftermath ==
Two years following the election, Miszalski was recalled by a referendum on 24 May 2026.
