= Kraków for Residents =

NGO in Kraków

Kraków for Residents Kraków dla Mieszkańców
- Abbreviation: KdM
- Leader: Łukasz Gibała
- Founded: 10 December 2014; 11 years ago
- Headquarters: ul. Kazimierza Wielkiego 60; 30-074 Kraków
- Ideology: Localism; Liberalism; Green politics Factions: Conservatism
- Political position: Centre to Centre-left
- Colours: Cyan; Blue; White
- City Mayors: 1 / 107 (0.9%)
- Lesser Poland assembly: 0 / 39 (0%)
- Kraków City Council: 5 / 43 (12%)

Website
- www.krakowdlamieszkancow.com

Kraków for Residents (Polish: Kraków dla Mieszkańców, KdM; until 2019 known as the Logical Alternative for Kraków (Polish: Logiczna Alternatywa dla Krakowa)) is a political non-governmental organization and a think-tank founded in December 2014 by entrepreneur and former Member of the Sejm Łukasz Gibała. It serves also as a councillors' club in the Kraków City Council.

The association monitors the activities and decisions of the city authorities of Kraków and proposes measures aimed at addressing urban issues in the city. It organizes social actions, offers free help as part of the Pogotowie Obywatelskie and Zielona linia, as part of which Kraków residents may report illegal tree cutting.

KdM is also a councillors' club in the Kraków City Council. Aside from Gibała, members of the club elected for the 9th term (2024-2029) of the City Council were Eliza Dydyńska-Czesak, Łukasz Maślona, Aleksandra Owca, Michał Starobrat, Rafał Zawiślak and Rafał Nowak. The club proposes legislation and interventions on local matters. It also includes a think tank aiding councillors, composed of experts and local activists.

The KdM also issues an eponymous bi-monthly gazette.

== Actions ==
- KdM runs projects that involve the residents of Kraków, such as the recurring Robimy tlen, campaign during which peace lily seedlings are distributed to draw attention to air pollution levels in Kraków, Niezłe ziółka promoting urban gardening through growing herbs on windowsills or balconies, #EKOzapakowani, an initiative aimed at promoting awareness of zero-waste practices, as part of which reusable bags and zero-waste household cleaning products were distributed.
- In 2017–2021, the association hosted free workshops on sewing anti-smog masks, construction of DIY air purifiers; several hundred shelters for hedgehogs were distributed to Kraków residents.
- Through the free legal advice provided by the Pogotowie Obywatelskie, over 1,500 Kraków residents were provided with legal advice.
- As part of the Zielona Linia, residents can verify the legality of tree felling.
- Between 2014 and 2018, the association ran the Majchrowski Watch campaign, during which it monitored 10 selected election promises made by city president Jacek Majchrowski.

== Program ==
The KdM's most important program points involve sustained development of the city, which includes better spatial planning to put a stop to the ongoing uncoordinated development, increasing green areas, combating smog, creating a transparent and efficient municipal office, as well as developing the creative economy and providing free public transport for residents paying taxes in Kraków. All of the association's postulates are accompanied by budget estimates based on the city's budget. The party focuses on localism, and apart from its focus on spatial planning and green spaces, also postulates an increasing public oversight of local institutions.

In 2018, as Logical Alternative, the association was described as centre-left. In 2024, Gibała and his association have also been described as centre-left, and the journalist Dominika Wielowieyska described him as a "liberal" with "leftist leanings". In an interview with Wielowieyska, Gibała stated that his left-wing views "do not concern economic issues, only urban ones". When Daria Gosek-Popiołek, the New Left Kraków MP, endorsed Gibała in the 2024 Kraków mayoral election, her endorsement was condemned by Razem, which claimed that Gibała is an "extreme economic neoliberal".

Gibała and KdM are considered liberal. Gibała, who was initially a member of Civic Platform before defecting to Palikot's Movement and founding KdM later, stated that Civic Platform had "departed from its liberal roots" and stated that his own association would focus on "facilities for entrepreneurs" and free-market policies. In a 2024 interview, Gibała stated that he is still a liberal and that he disagrees with Razem on the economy, although he shares its views on "urban issues", noting that together with Razem he postulates the creation of 24-hour abortion care centers staffed by doctors without a conscience clause, preventing city authorities from privatizing municipal apartments, and for green policies.

In 2026, Klub Jagielloński has argued that since 2024 Gibała and his associated have "clearly shifted to the right", and although most of the shift "was tactical in nature", "the changes are also programmatic in nature". During the 2026 Kraków mayoral election, Gibała stated that there are both conservatives and liberals in the association, although he emphasized the latter. Gibała has also stated his support for abortion on demand, registration of same-sex marriage in Poland, and moving religion classes from schools to churches. He argued that churches "play an important role in social life" the state should have "some kind of partnership" with them, the state should also be secular.

== Leadership ==
The KdM is led by a three-person executive composed of Gibała, as leader, Adrianna Siudy, deputy leader, and Barbara Macheta, secretary.

== Electoral results ==
=== President of Kraków ===
| Election year | Candidate | 1st round | | 2nd round | |
| Election year | Candidate | Votes | % | Votes | % |
|---|---|---|---|---|---|
| 2014 | Łukasz Gibała | 27,090 | 11.16 (#3) | | |
| 2018 | Łukasz Gibała | 57,901 | 17.14 (#3) | | |
| 2024 | Łukasz Gibała | 79,580 | 26.79 (#2) | 128,269 | 48.96 (#2) |
| 2026 | Łukasz Gibała | 93,042 | 36.38 (#1) | 161,184 | 62.12% (#1) |

=== Kraków City Council ===
| Election | Leader | Votes | % | Seats | +/– | Government |
|---|---|---|---|---|---|---|
| 2014 | Łukasz Gibała | 9,073 | 3.96 (#6) | 0 / 43 | New | No seats |
| 2018 | Łukasz Gibała | 41,953 | 12.73 (#3) | 4 / 43 | ▲4 | Opposition |
| 2024 | Łukasz Gibała | 46,012 | 15.56 (#3) | 7 / 43 | ▲3 | Opposition |
