= Majchrowski =

Majchrowski (feminine: Majchrowska, plural: Majchrowscy) is a Polish surname. Notable people with the surname include:

- Jacek Majchrowski (born 1947), Polish historian and politician
- Stefan Majchrowski (1908–1988), Polish writer
