= 2026 Kraków shooting =

Mass shooting in Kraków, Poland

- The perpetrator shooting from his vehicle while being chased by a police car

- Route of the attacker, the perpetrator started near the Main Square
- Location: 50°03′46″N 19°56′12.8″E; Main Square, Kraków, Poland
- Date: 7 November 2026; 15 days ago c. 15:00 (CET, UTC+01:00)
- Attack type: Mass shooting; drive-by shooting; spree shooting; shootout; familicide; mass murder
- Weapons: Diamondback DB-15 semi-automatic rifle; AR-15–style rifle; Walther P99 semi-automatic pistol; Glock semi-automatic pistol
- Deaths: 10 (7 in Kraków, including the perpetrator; 3 at the perpetrator's home in Ostrowiec Świętokrzyski)
- Injuries: 16
- Perpetrator: Michał Oksiński
- Defenders: Police officers: Officer Jakub Kulik; Officer Artur Morański
- Motive: Under investigation; treated as terrorism by authorities

On 7 November 2026, a mass shooting took place in Kraków, Poland, when 24-year-old Michał Oksiński opened fire from his car as he drove through the Main Square, killing six people and injuring 16 others before being shot by police. Following the shooting, police discovered the dead bodies of three members of his family and two pet cats in their apartment in Ostrowiec Świętokrzyski. Oksiński later died in a hospital in Kraków. His motives remain under investigation.

== Shootings ==
=== Ostrowiec Świętokrzyski shooting ===
On either the night before the Kraków shooting or in the morning thereof, Oksiński shot and killed his 53-year-old father, 52-year-old mother, and 21-year-old sister, as well as two cats, at their apartment in Ostrowiec Świętokrzyski. Their bodies were found after authorities began to investigate the later shooting in Kraków. (Note: Attributed to multiple sources:) None of the neighbours reported hearing gunfire; a silencer was reported to have been found in the shooter's car three days after the attack.

=== Kraków shooting ===
A CCTV still of the perpetrator's car immediately before he opened fire

On 7 November 2026, around 14:59 CET, a black 3rd generation Subaru Impreza hatchback with an Ostrowiec Świętokrzyski number plate entered the Main Square in Kraków from Sławkowska Street. The gunman, Oksiński, fired into a crowd from the car for over a minute. He wore military-style tactical gear and used an AR-15–style rifle during the attack.

The first emergency call was made around 15 seconds after 15:00. At 15:01, the first police patrol began pursuing the attacker.

A tram driver reported that at 15:05, his vehicle was fired upon by the gunman from his car near the Main Square. The driver's window was shattered, but no injuries were reported onboard the tram. Numerous tram lines were subsequently disrupted. The Zara shop in Kraków was also shot. The sounds were also mistaken for firecrackers.

The attacker then drove along the eastern side of the Main Square and fired more shots on the corner of Sienna Street, wounding a person. Afterwards, the suspect drove his car south from the square, along Grodzka Street, at speed whilst pursued by the police. The pursuit continued through All Saints Square and St. Mary Magdalene Square.

The attacker then crashed into another car at the intersection of Dietla and Stradom Streets and left his vehicle around 15:03. The pursuing police car stopped behind him, and two officers, Jakub Kulik and Artur Morański, got out, armed only with handguns. An exchange of gunfire ensued. During the exchange, both police officers were shot, but the attacker was also wounded and fell to the ground. Despite his injuries, Kulik got back up and fired additional shots, incapacitating the attacker. As a result, Oksiński was apprehended by the officers.

A CCTV still of the shootout between the gunman (right) and two police officers

The suspect was arrested about one kilometre (3/5 mi) south of the Main Square; approximately two minutes elapsed between the start of the pursuit and the exchange of gunfire. As reported by the Lesser Poland voivode Krzysztof Klęczar, 1,146 police officers, along with 24 units of the State Fire Service and 62 firefighters and rescuers, took part in the operation following the attack. Overall, 1,146 police officers, 88 firefighters from 35 fire crews, and 15 emergency medical teams were involved in the response during the first 24 hours.

== Victims ==
Memorial candles lit for the victims at Sławkowska Street (10 November)

At the square, four women and two men were killed. Four fatalities were Polish nationals: three women aged 47, 53 and 61, and a man aged 51. Two foreigners were killed: a 32-year-old British man identified as James Thomas Campbell from Prestwick, South Ayrshire, and a 51-year-old Austrian woman. Sixteen people were injured, including five foreign citizens and two police officers. By 8 November, both wounded police officers had been brought out of their comas but remained in a serious condition. Animal rights group OTOZ Animals said that the attacker also shot and wounded two horses, one of which was hit in the leg.

Among the dead was painter Izabela Woźna, aged 53, from the town of Chodzież; she had come to Kraków for an exhibition of her art. Another was Ewelina Serafin, aged 47, who was actively involved in Noble Gift, a Polish charitable initiative. Also killed was Robert Kosidło, aged 55, a trader's assistant who worked around Kraków's Main Market Square. Dorota Baran, aged 61, was also killed in the shooting.

A carriage driver lost a finger due to the shooting, and her horses ran away with the carriage. Initially, she did not realize she had been injured, only later noticing that she was bleeding. 27-year-old Joanna Furmanowicz from Legnica was critically injured, but underwent life-saving surgeries and is now in stable condition.

Oksiński's parents had been designated to sit on a local electoral commission in Bodzechów by candidate Paweł Tanajno's campaign during the 2020 Polish presidential election; Oksiński's father and sister later served on the same commission on behalf of the Normal Country party during the 2023 Polish parliamentary election, the perpetrator himself had no relationship to any of the victims, nor any involvement in any of their activities or affiars.

== Perpetrator ==
The perpetrator was identified as Michał Oksiński (2002 – 9 November 2026), a 24-year-old male Polish citizen from Ostrowiec Świętokrzyski, who worked as a turner (machinist) at the Ostrowiec Refractory Materials Plant (OZMO) after obtaining a computer numerical control machining qualification from a local vocational school. According to neighbours, he was withdrawn and rarely spoke to people in his neighbourhood.

A former schoolmate alleged that during his school years he drew violent scenes, including hanging figures and armed attackers targeting schools. Some drawings allegedly featured swastikas. She also described him as socially isolated. Conversely, one of his close friends, who had known him since primary school, claimed that he exhibited no behaviours that could be characterised as right-wing, though, in the same interview, he was described by this friend as being "very emotional about all kinds of failures and setbacks" and "easily offended", often to the point of tears. Nevertheless, his former principal described him as a good student who participated in school life and did not cause behavioral problems.

Oksiński joined the rifle club Świt in Starachowice, equipped with an International Shooting Sport Federation standard range, as a competitive sports shooter in 2022. Following the completion of his training, he became entitled to apply for a sporting purpose gun permit as a licensed athlete obliged to compete twice per year. He obtained such a permit for one rifle and one pistol from the Kielce police in January 2026, acquiring his first gun in March. A spokesman for the club, who described Oksiński as an average competitor, stated that he had only taken part in one of his two mandatory competitions in 2026, that he had visited the range three times in 2026, always in the company of his father, and that he had last been seen in August. The father was also a member of the club and had 11 firearms registered in his name.

Local shooting practitioners stated that Oksiński had trained dynamic shooting with his father at the combat ranges utilized by the Territorial Defence Force, an activity that had increased in popularity since the outbreak of the Russo-Ukrainian war. A metal cupboard containing seven handguns and long guns was found in the family flat. According to the attacker's grandmother, his father, who had served in the army, had gifted him a uniform for his eighteenth birthday.

Oksiński was shot and wounded by police during his arrest; these wounds eventually lead to his death at 4:30 in the morning local time on 9 November. He wore military-style fatigues, a Chinese-made bullet-resistant vest, and a combat helmet with earmuffs, and wielded an AR-15 carbine manufactured by U.S. company Diamondback Firearms, equipped with an optical sight. He carried three other weapons in his car, including a Walther P99 pistol, a Glock pistol, and another AR-15–style rifle, (Note: Attributed to multiple sources:) along with some 500 rounds of ammunition. He wore an embroidered patch with the flag of Blackbeard (purchased in the preceding week along with three other patches, including a Gadsden flag), and he also wore a black T-shirt with a green exit sign and text saying "uciekłem z morawicy" (lit. 'I escaped from Morawica'), a reference to a psychiatric hospital located in the town. He also had four phones.

== Investigation ==
Bullet holes on a building on Sławkowska street (10 November)

The gunman was taken to a hospital in police custody where he underwent three operations. On 8 November, his condition was described as "very critical", and he died the following morning, on Monday, 9 November.

Prosecutors said that investigators were treating the attack as a terror incident. The Minister of the Interior, Marcin Kierwiński, initially described the suspect as "ultra-nationalist", and stated that everything indicates he was inspired by "far-right ideologies" and held "very radical views". However, the Ministry of the Interior and Administration later withdrew this assessment, and Kierwiński said that the shooter's motives remain unclear and that he was hypothesizing. The Minister of Justice, Waldemar Żurek, said another hypothesis is that this was simply a person fascinated by rampage killers not motivated by one particular ideology. The head of Poland's National Security Bureau, Bartosz Grodecki, said that it could be nihilistic extremism, unrelated to any political ideology. The Lesser Poland head of provincial administration, Krzysztof Klęczar confirmed that the suspect belonged to an organisation but refused to disclose its name, citing its obscurity.

On 9 November, National Prosecutor's Office spokesman Przemysław Nowak stated that investigators had not gathered sufficient evidence to determine the perpetrator's ideological motivations or possible inspirations. Prosecutors reported finding a Gadsden flag in his room but emphasised that the symbol had multiple interpretations and was not inherently associated with extremism. No other clearly identifiable symbols associated with far-right or far-left movements had been found. Investigators continued to examine the perpetrator's electronic devices and possible connections to other individuals.

According to Kierwiński and findings by the Kraków police, who gained access to the attacker's computer, he had been interested in mass shooters for many weeks, and had searched for information about Anders Breivik, Charles Manson, and Ted Kaczynski. The Internal Security Agency deciphered an inscription that the perpetrator had on his locker at work. It read "GGER", an abbreviation that the authorities believe refers to the phrase "Good Game Elliot Rodger", the perpetrator of the Isla Vista attacks. The attacker left no text that would indicate his motives.

== Reactions ==

Marshal of the Sejm Włodzimierz Czarzasty paying tribute to the victims on Sławkowska Street (11 November 2026)

Later on 7 November, Kraków mayor Łukasz Gibała declared a period of mourning in the city until 11 November. President of Poland Karol Nawrocki declared a period of national mourning for 8 and 9 November and flags were flown at half-mast. Sporting and cultural events were preceded by a minute of silence and some were postponed. Television stations limited entertainment programming. The cities of Warsaw and Wrocław announced the implementation of tighter security measures in response to the attack. On 9 November, a silent march was held in Kraków in memory of the victims.

Prime Minister of Poland Donald Tusk described the shooting as "tragic" in a post on social media. He also called the shooting an "act of terrorism". Many officials worldwide condemned the shooting and expressed solidarity with the victims. (Note: Attributed to multiple sources:)

On 9 November, President Nawrocki awarded the Officer's Cross of the Order of Polonia Restituta to senior constables Jakub Kulik and Artur Morański, the two police officers who had been seriously wounded while apprehending the gunman. The decorations were awarded in recognition of their exceptional bravery and contributions to public safety.

Kraków mayor Łukasz Gibała also proposed granting both officers honorary citizenship of Kraków, the city's highest distinction. The proposal received unanimous support from city councillors, although its formal approval remained pending. The mayor additionally announced plans to award the city's Honoris Gratia distinction to several people involved in rescuing victims, including municipal guards, medical personnel and bystanders who assisted during the attack.

Germany, France, Italy, Ukraine, the United Kingdom, Spain, Latvia, Lithuania, Estonia, Ireland, Czechia, Slovakia, Hungary, Moldovia, Romania, the United States, Sweden, Finland, Norway, Malaysia, Turkey, Israel, Palestine, Kuwait, and the United Arab Emirates expressed their condolences and solidarity with Poland. (Note: Attributed to multiple sources:)

== Disinformation and misinformation ==
In the immediate aftermath of the shooting, Polish officials reported a wave of false and misleading content on social media.

=== On social media ===
Deputy Prime Minister and Digital Affairs Minister Krzysztof Gawkowski warned of a "significant wave of disinformation" on X. Elon Musk, the owner of X, amplified unsubstantiated claims about the suspect's identity and motives. He shared posts with unconfirmed and baseless information describing the attacker as a "homosexual communist" and a "pro-abortion, pro-LGBT leftist extremist who hates Christianity". Elon Musk's involvement would be identified by the European Digital Media Observatory as disproportionately contributing to public's distrust and misunderstanding of the event.

Fact-checkers debunked several viral images purporting to show the perpetrator. RTBF reported that montages depicting the shooter as a "far-left activist" and "pro-LGBT" were seen millions of times across social media and contained images enhanced or altered with AI tools. There were also altered versions of the authentic photo showing the perpetrator holding a rainbow flag while wearing a gas mask, edited to make it appear as though he was holding an OUN-UPA flag. Images of an unrelated individual are mistakenly claimed to be that of the perpetrator, to support assumptions of Oksiński being pro-immigration.

Another piece of misinformation claimed that the perpetrator was wearing a T-shirt displaying a nationalist symbol during the shootings, while in fact the shirt featured an emergency exit sign accompanied by the words "I escaped from Morawica", referring to a psychiatric hospital in the town of Morawica.

Another prominent false narrative claimed that the shooter was a Ukrainian mercenary or had pro-Ukrainian sympathies. AFP found that an image showing a masked individual in tactical gear with a Ukrainian flag patch, falsely identified as the Kraków shooter, was AI-generated. Polish disinformation monitors recorded that the claim gained significant traction online before being debunked.

The Polish government formally reported thousands of accounts spreading illegal and disinformation content to X's moderation team. According to Deputy Digital Affairs Minister Dariusz Standerski, X did not respond to a single report, unlike Meta and TikTok, which remained in contact with the ministry. The episode renewed debates in Poland and the European Union over platform accountability under the Digital Services Act, particularly regarding the viral amplification of AI-generated falsehoods during breaking news events.

=== By mainstream media ===
Telewizja Republika was the first broadcaster to arrive at the scene, during its initial live coverage the station reported having received information suggesting that foreigners were involved in the shooting, this information was subsequently corrected, the station also raised concerns about the insufficient police presence at the scene, a claim that was later denied by the police. However they continued to defend the narrative on insufficient number of policemen during the attack, blaming the government and the 2026 Polish Constitutional Tribunal crisis.
