= Jakub Kulik =

Polish police officer

- Born: 2002 (age 23–24)
- Military career
- Allegiance: Poland
- Branch: Polish Armed Forces; Polish Police
- Service years: 2022–present
- Rank: Senior constable
- Units: 18th Airborne Battalion; 1st Police Station, Kraków
- Known for: Confronting the perpetrator of the 2026 Kraków shooting
- Awards: Order of Polonia Restituta (Officer's Cross)

Jakub Kulik (born 2002) is a Polish police officer holding the rank of senior constable, a volunteer firefighter, and a former professional soldier. In November 2026, together with fellow police officer Artur Morański, he took part in the pursuit of the perpetrator of the 2026 Kraków shooting, during which he incapacitated the gunman.

== Biography ==
Kulik comes from Bielsko-Biała. In 2021, he graduated from the city's Adam Asnyk Second General Secondary School, where he attended a class specializing in emergency services and rescue training. He served as an altar server and lector at the Parish of Christ the King in Bielsko-Biała.

In October 2022, he began serving in the Polish Armed Forces as a soldier of the 18th Airborne Battalion, named after Captain Ignacy Gazurek, which forms part of the 6th Airborne Brigade, named after Brigadier General Stanisław Sosabowski. He is also involved in the local emergency services community as a volunteer member of the Volunteer Fire Department in Leszczyny. In 2023, he guarded Polish border with Belarus against illegal immigration.

In 2025, Kulik joined the Polish Police. He was assigned to the patrol and intervention unit of the 1st Police Station in Kraków, which operates under the authority of the Kraków Municipal Police Headquarters.

He is married, the same priest who mentored him when he was an altar server officiated at his wedding.

== Kraków shooting and pursuit of the perpetrator ==
The vehicle driven by the perpetrator of the shooting, captured by a municipal CCTV camera. A police car can be seen in the distance.

On 7 November 2026, Jakub Kulik was on patrol duty in the vicinity of Kraków Old Town together with fellow senior constable Artur Morański. At approximately 3:00 p.m., a mass shooting occurred in the area. The attacker, Michał Oksiński, opened fire on random pedestrians with an AR-15 rifle near the point where Sławkowska Street enters the Main Market Square. The first emergency call concerning the shooting was received by the regional emergency notification centre in Kraków at 3:00:15 p.m. A total of 40 emergency calls were recorded, as later confirmed by the Commander-in-Chief of the Polish Police, Marek Boroń. The police dispatcher deployed all available forces to the scene, comprising 30 patrol units. As Kulik and Morański were the closest officers to the Main Market Square, they were able to respond immediately, witihin 23 seconds after the emergency call. Their patrol, operating police car number 133, reached the scene via Sienna Street and began pursuing the fleeing gunman.

The attacker fled the Main Market Square, travelling along Grodzka Street, All Saints' Square, and Stradomska Street. The pursuit, during which the police patrols kept track of his movements, ended at the intersection with Józef Dietl Street, where Oksiński's vehicle collided with another passenger car. The attacker exited his vehicle and opened fire on the responding police officers. Despite sustaining three gunshot wounds, Kulik continued to perform his duties and attempted to administer first aid to himself by applying a tourniquet. He also succeeded in incapacitating the attacker. A total of 123 seconds elapsed between the beginning of the pursuit by Kulik and Morański's patrol and the gunman's apprehension.

At the scene, the wounded officers received emergency medical assistance from two surgeons from the University Hospital in Kraków, Michał Pędziwiatr and Mateusz Wierdak, who happened to be nearby. Kulik was subsequently taken to hospital, where he underwent surgery and was temporarily placed in a medically induced coma. A blood donation drive was also organized on his behalf at the Military Blood Donation and Transfusion Centre.

== Honours and recognition ==
On 9 November, President Karol Nawrocki awarded both Kulik and Morański the Officer's Cross of the Order of Polonia Restituta. The decorations were awarded in recognition of their exceptional bravery and contributions to public safety. On 8 November 2026, the day after the Kraków shooting, the Mayor of Kraków, Łukasz Gibała, submitted a motion to the Kraków City Council to grant Kulik the title of Honorary Citizen of the Royal Capital City of Kraków. On 10 November 2026, at the request of Mayor Jarosław Klimaszewski, the procedure for granting Kulik honorary citizenship of Bielsko-Biała was also initiated.
