= Wielopolski Palace =

Coordinates: 50.0585°N 19.9368°E

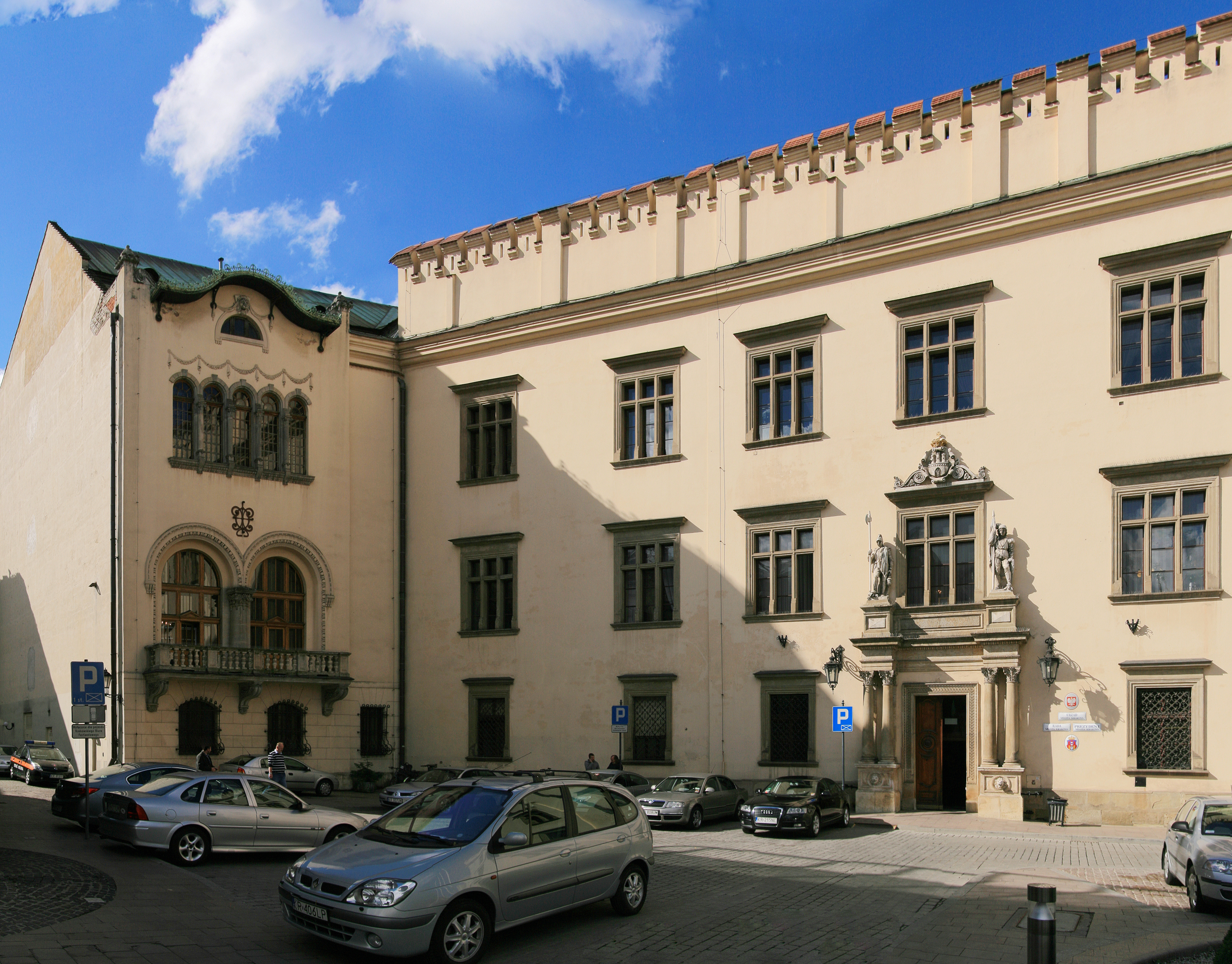
- Wielopolski Palace entrance

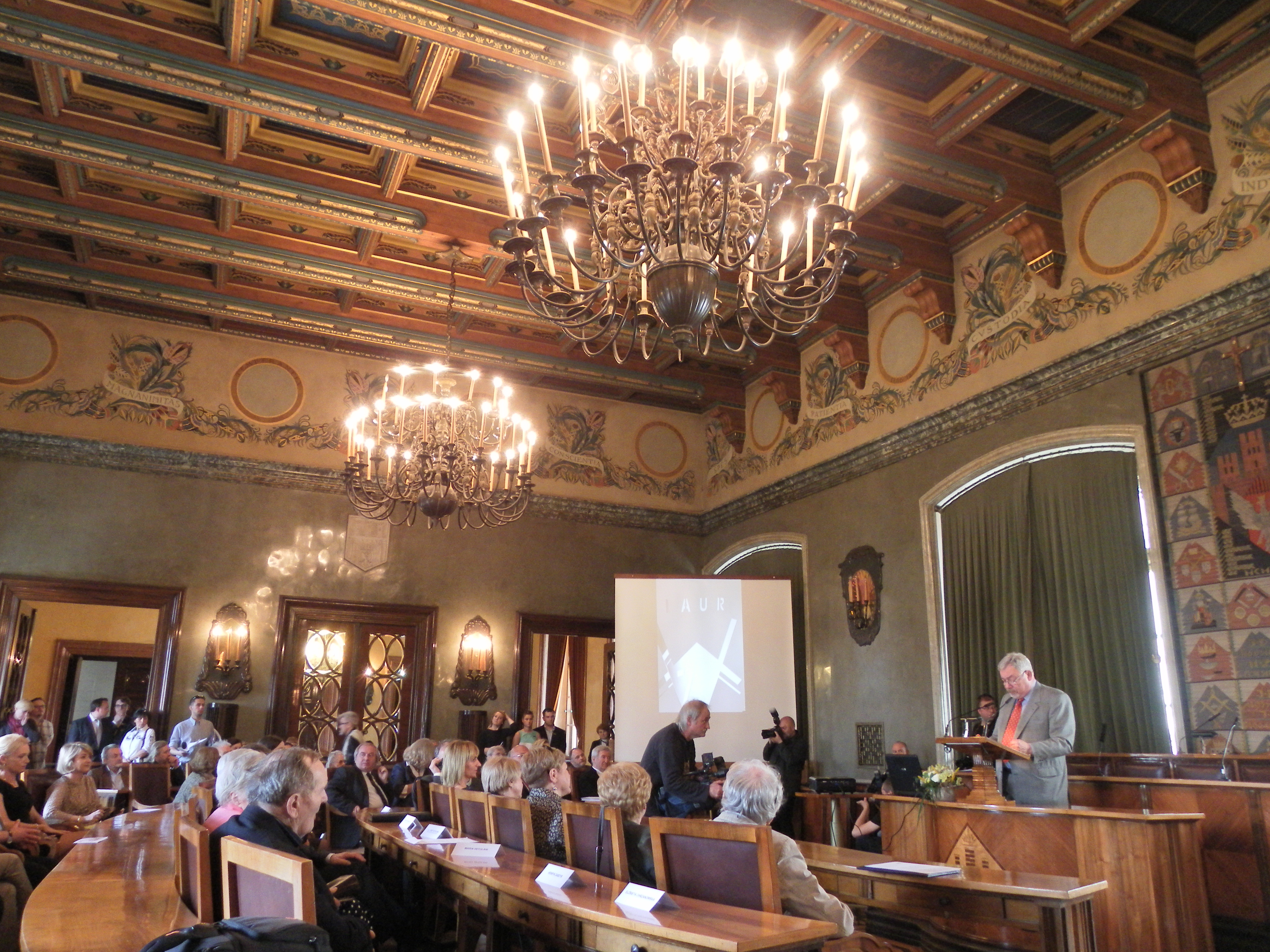
- Speaking president of the city, Jacek Majchrowski

History
- Built: 1535–1560
- Founded by: Hetman Jan Tarnowski

The Wielopolski Palace in Kraków, Poland, is the location of the Kraków City Council and the office of the President of Kraków. The palace and the courtyard buildings are located between the All Saints 3–4 Square (Plac Wszystkich Świętych) and the Deputies 8–12 Street (ul. Poselska), which is the official address of the City Hall.

== History ==
The Wielopolski Palace was built in 1535–1560 for Hetman Jan Tarnowski. After the death of Tarnowski in 1561 the palace passed into the hands of Ostrogski and Zamoyski families. Between the mid-17th century and the mid-19th century, the building remained in the hands of Wielopolski family. Part of the palace was made available by the owners for various societal and public purposes. There were theatre productions held at the auditoriums and art exhibitions organized including painting studio gallery of Piotr Michałowski, one of the greatest Polish painters of the Romantic period. The palace was severely damaged during the fire of Krakow in 1850; the Wielopolskis decided to sell the burned-out building.

The new owner of the palace, surgeon Wojciech Kowalski, made the necessary repairs and in 1857 leased the palace to a Viennese profiteer Ferdinand von Winter, who operated the café Winter there. The interiors were remodelled for masquerade balls, and musical evenings. His cafe was elegant and rather popular, one of the first in the city. Later, rooms were leased to Ignacy Mażka and Napoleon Gross photo studio.

=== Town Hall (1864) ===
In 1864 the palace was purchased by the Municipality of Kraków. According to Resolution of the City Council the building restoration was carried out based on design by architect Paweł Barański from 1865 to 1868. In the second floor renovations, a brand new Council Chamber was created for the city. Furniture was designed by architect Filip Pokutyński. The upper parts of the walls of the hall were decorated with carved busts of the Polish kings. A new gallery of portraits of presidents of the city was launched, placing them on the walls of the hall. Municipal offices and the office of Mayor were located on the first floor.

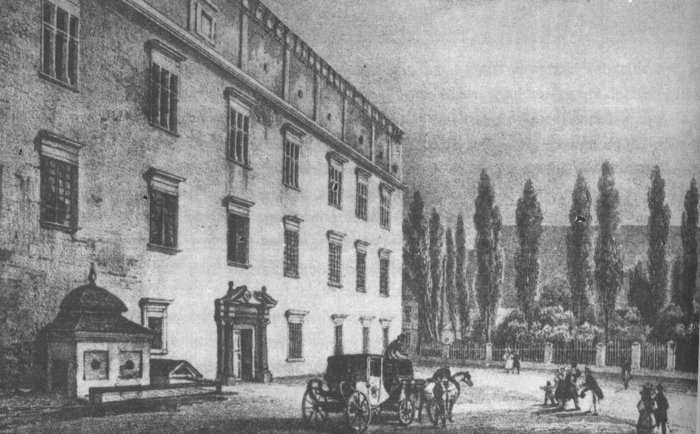
Engraving of the Palace from 1836

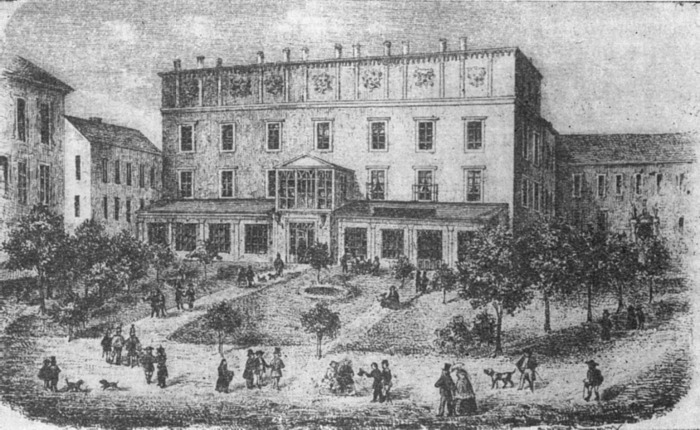
View at the end of the 19th century

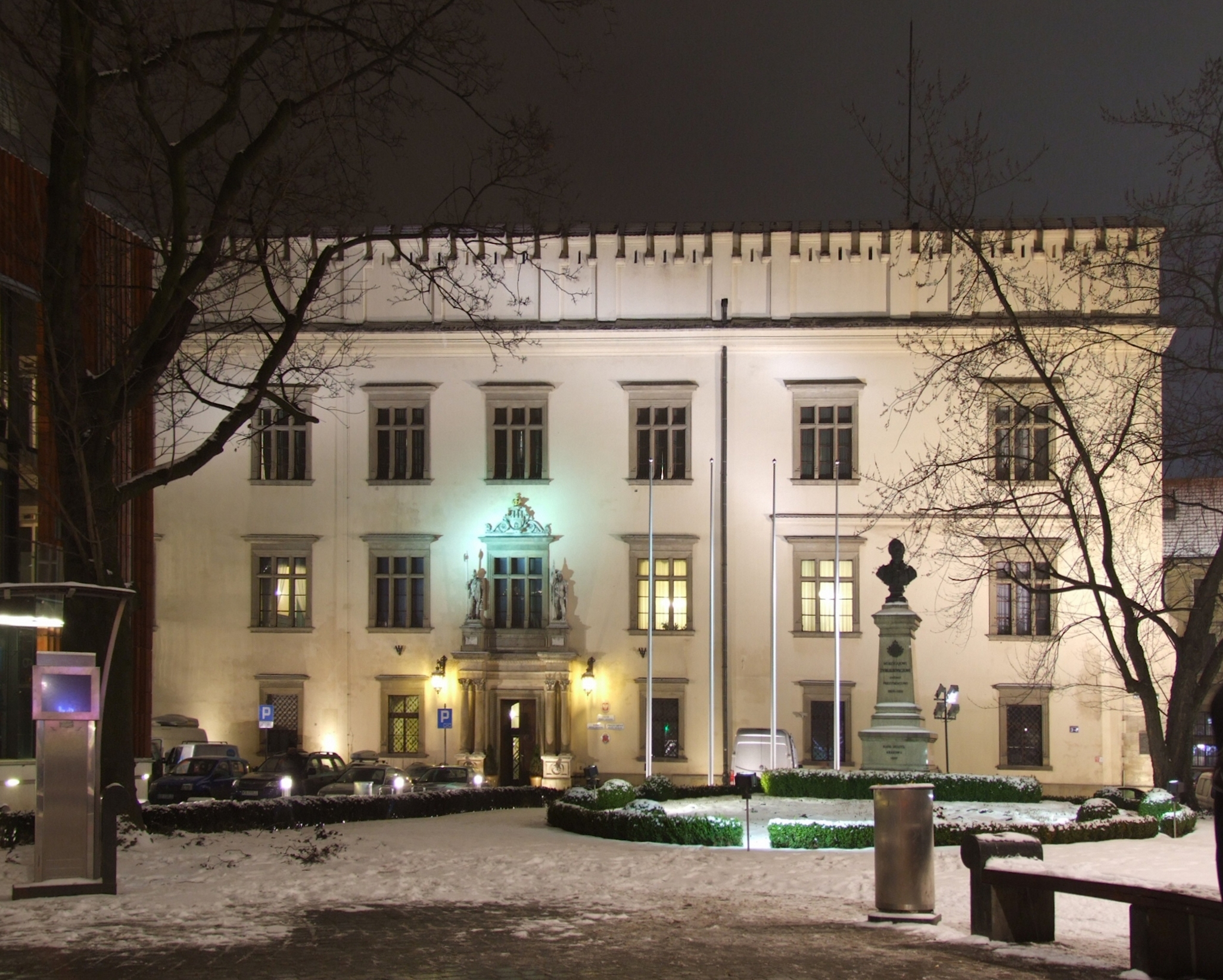
Wielopolski Palace in winter, today
