= Stanisław Mazur (politician) =

Polish political scientist (born 1969)

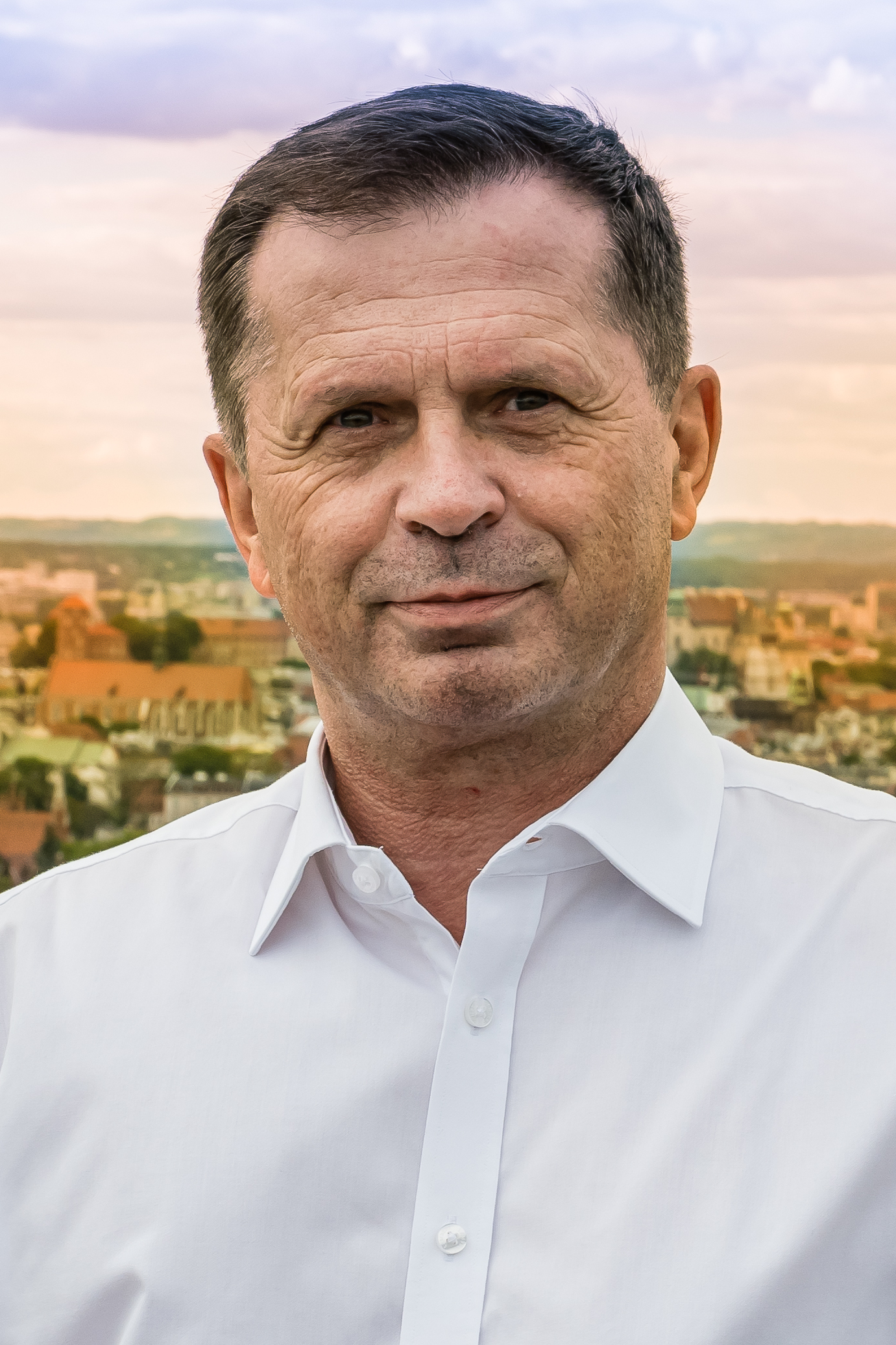

Rector of the Kraków University of Economics

Doctor of Humanities
- In office 2020–2024
- Preceded by: Andrzej Chochół
- Succeeded by: Bernard Ziębicki

Dean of the Faculty of Public Economy and Administration
- In office 2016–2020

Deputy Mayor of the Royal Capital City of Kraków
- In office 2024–2026
- President: Aleksander Miszalski

Personal details
- Born: 8 May 1969 (age 57) Kamienica, Poland
- Education: Jagiellonian University

Stanisław Mazur (born 8 May 1969 in Kamienica) is Polish political scientist, local government official, habilitated doctor of humanities, university professor at the University of Economics in Kraków and its rector for the 2020–2024 term, and Deputy Mayor of Kraków from 2024 to 2026.

== Biography ==
He graduated in Jan Długosz High School No. 1 in Nowy Sącz. In 1994, he graduated in political science from the Jagiellonian University. He obtained his PhD in 1999 at his alma mater on the basis of a dissertation entitled: The Organisation and Doctrine of the Liberal International, supervised by Andrzej Zięba. He was awarded the academic degree of Postdoctoral Doctor in the humanities in 2012 at the University of Wrocław on the basis of his academic output and a work titled Discretionary Power of Senior Public Officials. A New Institutionalist Perspective.

He is affiliated with the Kraków School of Economics, which was transformed into the University of Economics, where he took up the post of associate professor in 2014 and, following legal changes, that of university professor. In 1996–1997, he was head of the Centre for Studies in Economics and Administration, and in 1997–2005, director of the Małopolska School of Public Administration at the Krakow University of Economics. From 2014, he successively headed the Department of Economics and Public Administration, the Department of Public Administration and the Department of Public Policy. Between 2016 and 2020, he held the position of dean of the Faculty/College of Economics and Public Administration. In June 2020, he was elected Rector of the University of Economics in Krakow for the 2020–2024 term.

He specialises in public policy, public administration and public management. Editor-in-chief of the journal “Public Management”, president of the Foundation for Economics and Public Administration in Kraków (2007–2009) and member of the Civil Service Council (2009–2015).

He was the initiator and a member of the Better Kraków Association, which was established in 2022 as a civil society organisation seeking new solutions for public policies in Kraków. One of the initiators and organisers of the academic seminars “Good Governance” and “The Kraków Circle”, leader and participant in numerous national and international research projects in the field of public policy and public administration. Member of the Conference of Rectors of Economic Universities for the 2020–2024 term. Member of the International Public Policy Association. Author of over 260 publications.

He has collaborated with the European Commission, the World Bank and the United States Agency for International Development (USAID).

Since 2021, he has served on the advisory board of ABSL (The Association of Business Service Leaders – ABSL), which is responsible for identifying and supporting key changes in the field of education and training, as well as working to increase Poland's attractiveness to talented individuals from abroad.

He is one of the coordinators of the Decentralization Offering Better Results and Efficiency (DOBRE) project, implemented with financial support from USAID. Its aim is to prepare Ukrainian local authorities for the reconstruction of Ukraine.

In November 2023, he announced that he would stand for the office of Mayor of Kraków in the next local elections in 2024. On 3 April 2024, he withdrew from the election, endorsing Aleksander Miszalski, who later won the election. On 14 May 2024, he was appointed First Deputy Mayor of Kraków, responsible, among other things, for urban development, spatial planning and the economy. On the same day, he stepped down from the post of rector.

On 24 May 2026, a referendum was held in Kraków on the recall of the Mayor of Kraków, in which Aleksander Miszalski was recalled. Consequently, his deputies, including Stanisław Mazur, were also recalled.

== Criminal proceedings ==
In 2023, he filed a report alleging that a crime of causing damage in commercial transactions, resulting in a loss to the University of Economics in Kraków, had been committed by University employees: Jakub Kwaśny (since 2024 Mayor of Tarnów) and Piotr Buła (former Vice-Rector of the University of Economics in Kraków). In 2025, the proceedings against them were discontinued.

Since 2023, criminal proceedings have been pending against him for the offence of defamation, following a complaint by Jakub Kwaśny and Piotr Buła.
