= Józef Lassota =

Polish politician

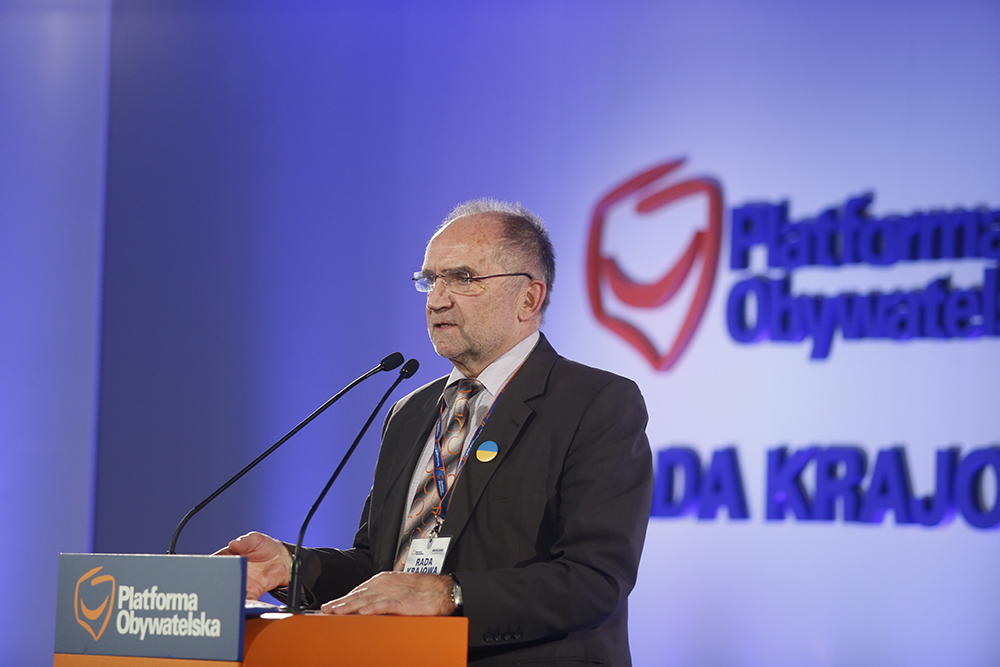

45th Mayor of Kraków
- In office 9 October 1992 – 4 November 1998
- Preceded by: Krzysztof Bachmiński
- Succeeded by: Andrzej Maria Gołaś

Personal details
- Born: 24 October 1943 (age 81); Siedliska, Rzeszów County, Poland
- Political party: Civic Platform (from 2005); Freedom Union (until 2005)

Józef Lassota is a Polish politician who served as mayor of Kraków from 1992 to 1998.
