= Jan Kracik =

Roman Catholic priest and historian (1941–2014)

- Jan Kracik, 2007
- Born: 11 November 1941; Spytkowice
- Died: 24 April 2014 (aged 72)
- Occupation: Historian

Jan Kracik (11 November 1941 – 24 April 2014) was a Roman Catholic priest, historian and columnist.

== Biography ==
He was born as the son of a farmer; an elder brother of Stanisław Kracik. He supervised four doctoral dissertations. His doctoral students included Grzegorz Ryś. His texts were released in Tygodnik Powszechny and Znak.

== Books ==
- Vix venerabiles. Z dziejów społecznych niższego kleru parafialnego w archidiakonacie krakowskim w XVII–XVIII wieku. Kraków. 1982.
- Hultaje, złoczyńcy, wszetecznice w dawnym Krakowie. Kraków. 1986. Co-authored with Michał Rożek.
- Pokonać czarną śmierć. Staropolskie postawy wobec zarazy. Kraków. 1991.
- Ludzie z przedmieścia historii. Kleparzanie czasów staropolskich. Kraków. 1993.
- Żarty niepoświęcone. Kraków. 1993.
- Święty Kościół grzesznych ludzi. Kraków. 1998.
- Relikwie. Kraków. 2002.
- Powszechny, Apostolski, w historię wpisany. Z wędrówek po kościelnej przeszłości. Kraków. 2005.
- Spytkowice za królewskich i cesarskich czasów. Wieś i parafia. Kraków. 2008.
- W Galicji trzeźwiejącej, krwawej, pobożnej. 2008.
- Święci wielcy i pomniejsi. Żywoty nielukrowane. Kraków. 2010.
- Historia kościoła katolickiego w Polsce. Wrocław. 2010.
- Prawie wielebni. Z dziejów kleru parafialnego w XVII–XVIII wieku. Kraków. 2011.
- Staropolskie spory o kult obrazów. Kraków: Wydawnictwo Petrus. 2009.
- Chrześcijaństwo kontra magia. Historyczne perypetie. Kraków. 2012.

Review.

== Awards ==
- Józef Tischner Award
- Kraków Book of the Month Award for W Galicji trzeźwiejącej, krwawej, pobożnej (April 2008)

== Bibliography ==
- Ryś, Grzegorz (2011). "Ks. Jan Kracik (1941-). 2/3 biografii". In Elżbieta Elena Wróbel; Rafał Szczurowski (eds.). Historia bliższa ludziom. Prace ofiarowane Księdzu profesorowi Janowi Kracikowi w 70. rocznicę urodzin. Kraków. pp. 15–52.
- Kowalski, Waldemar (2014). "Ks. prof. dr hab. Jan Kracik (11.11.1941–24.04.2014)". Studia Historyczne (227): 427–431. ISSN 0025-1429.
