= Local government in Kraków =

City government in Poland

Each president of the city of Kraków (known as the Mayor) fulfills his duties with the help of the City Council, city managers and the city inspectors. Their joint responsibilities include drafting and implementing resolutions, enacting city bylaws, managing the city budget and preparing against floods and natural disasters. The Kraków Council resides at the Wielopolski Palace at All Saints 3-4 Square in a historic building erected originally in 1560 and purchased by the Municipality in 1864.

== The city budget of Kraków ==
The budget of the city of Kraków, which is presented by the Mayor of Kraków on 15 November each year, in 2006 had a projected revenue of 2,150 million złoty. The sources of revenue were as follows: 14% from the municipal taxation on real estate properties as well as on the use of amenities, 3% in taxes collected by Collections Office, 7% from sale and lease of city-owned properties, 30% in transfers from the national budget based in federal income tax, 34% in state subsidies, 3% in union fees, 1% from tax on liquor sales permits, and 8% from vehicle registrations, passport fees and others.

Projected expenditures, to the total amount of 2,349 million złoty, included: 79% in city maintenance costs, and 21% in city development costs. The maintenance costs were divided as follows: 39% toward education and childcare, 9% for the city infrastructure and lighting, 31% toward social services, 4% for culture and recreational facilities, 3% for mortgage repayments, 1% in transfers to poorer districts and 13% for other expenses including city administration.

City of Kraków development costs were divided as follows: 41% toward road building, transport and communication, 25% – city's infrastructure and environment, 2% for social housing, 8% for modernization of cultural facilities including museums, 15% for sports facilities, and 9% for hospitals, daycare centres and schools.

=== Budget of Krakow for the year 2006: revenue and expenditures ===
I. Revenue	2 149 835 225	II. Expenditures	2 349 197 000
Result: deficit (I – II)	199 361 775		
III. Fed. transfers	381 007 500	IV. Payments	181 645 725
Credits	346 554 500	Credit payments	180 645 725
Loan payments	3 453 000	Loans given	1 000 000
Surplus	31 000 000		
Total (I and III)	2 530 842 725	Total (II and IV)	2 530 842 725

== President of Kraków ==
President of Kraków is elected every five years in an election by city voters through a secret ballot. The election of City Council and the local head of government, which takes place at the same time, is based on legislation introduced on 20 June 2002. The current President of Kraków is Aleksander Miszalski, who was sworn in on May 7, 2024, for his first term after winning the second round of elections with over 133,000 votes.

== See also ==
- Kraków City Council
