= Jolanta Niezgodzka =

Polish politician (born 1991)

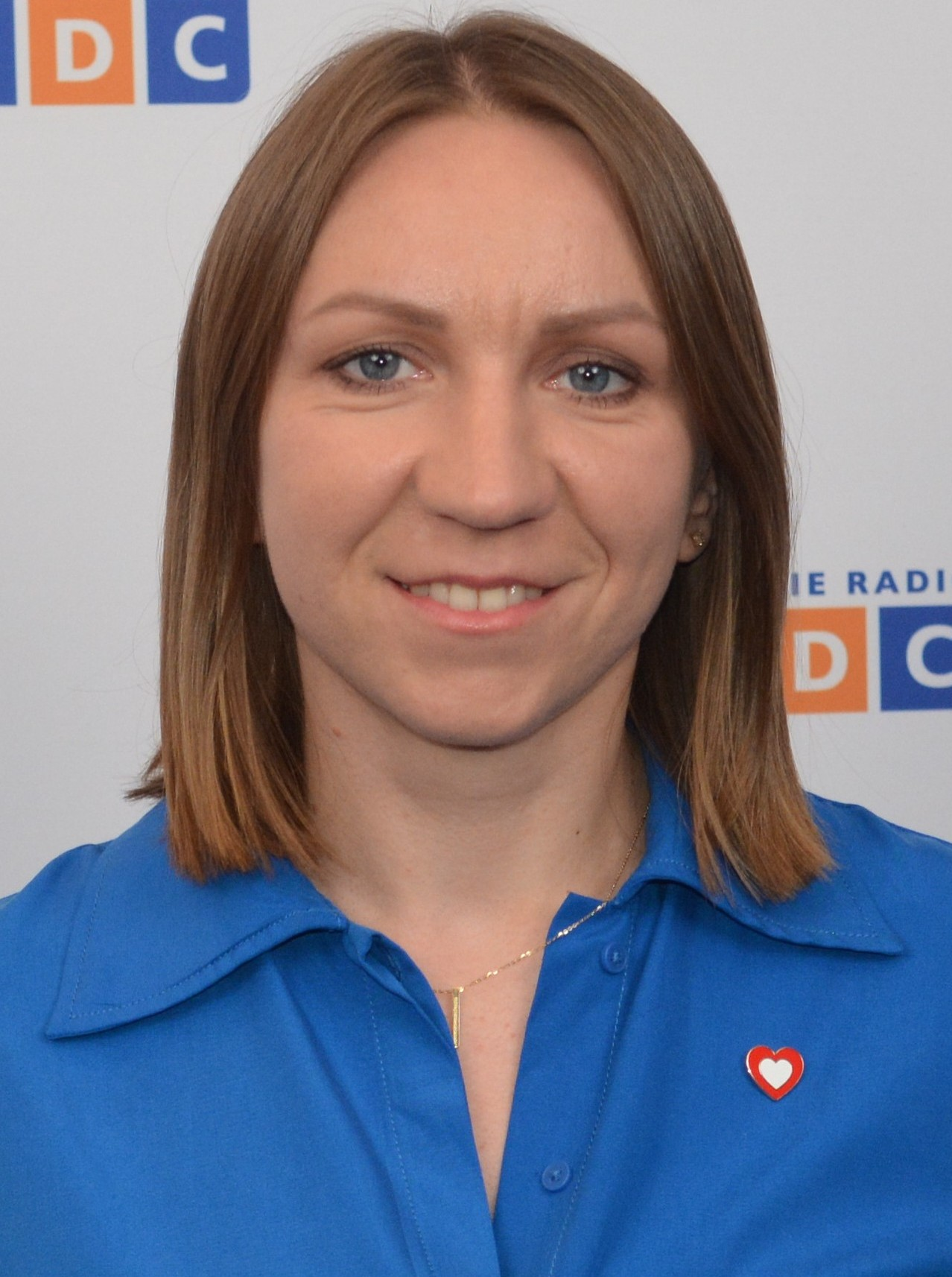
- Jolanta Niezgodzka in 2025

Member of the Sejm
- Incumbent
- Assumed office 12 November 2023
- Constituency: Sejm Constituency no. 3

Personal details
- Born: 26 February 1991 (age 35) Kłobuck
- Party: Civic Platform

Jolanta Niezgodzka (born 26 February 1991) is a Polish politician.

== See also ==
- List of Sejm members (2023–2027)
