= Jarosław Obremski =

Polish politician

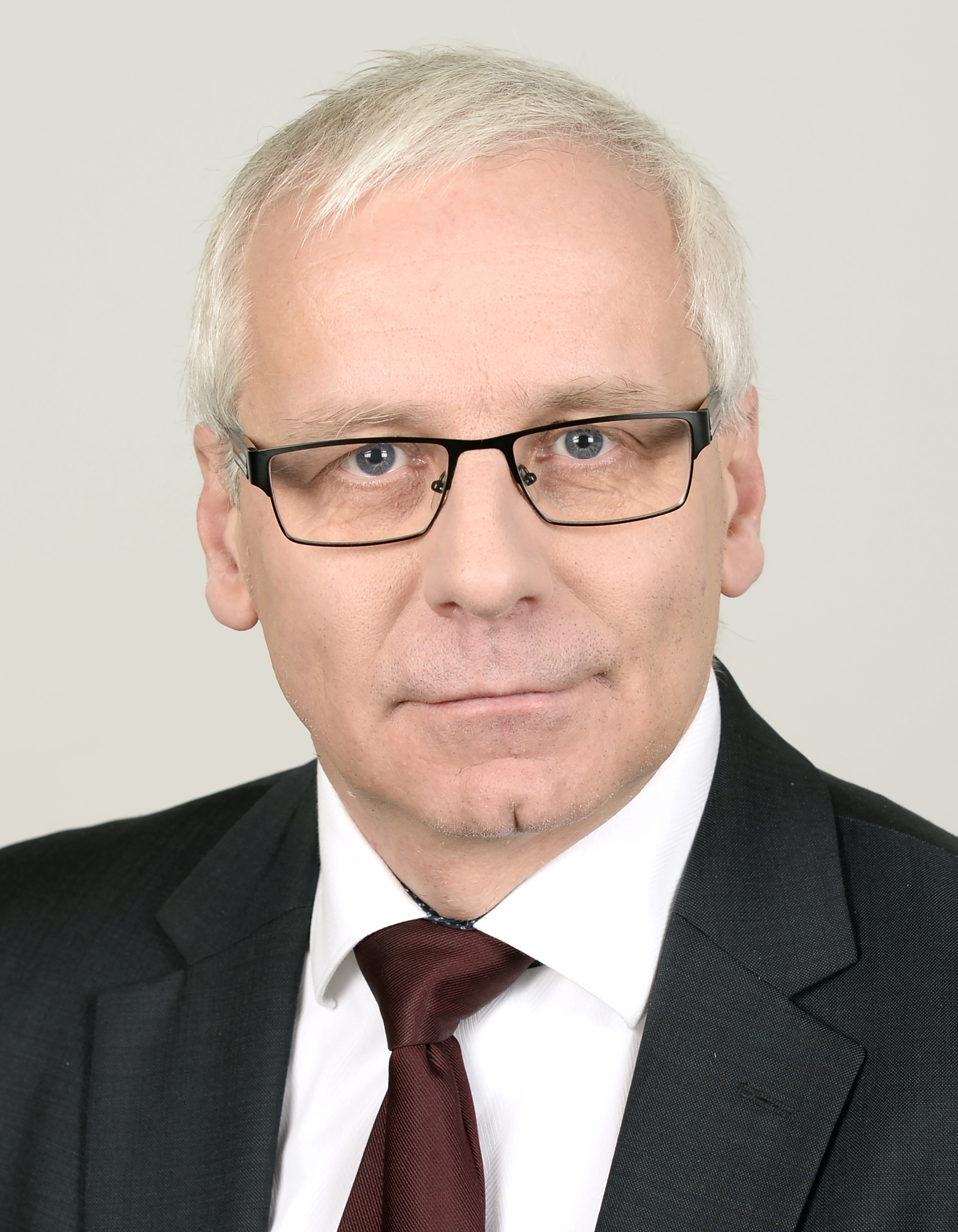
- Obremski in 2015

Voivode of Lower Silesian Voivodeship
- In office November 2019 – November 2023
- President: Andrzej Duda
- Prime Minister: Mateusz Morawiecki
- Preceded by: Paweł Hreniak
- Succeeded by: Maciej Awiżeń

Personal details
- Born: 14 June 1962 (age 64) Wrocław, Polish People's Republic
- Citizenship: Poland
- Party: Law and Justice
- Other political affiliations: Conservative Party; Conservative People's Party; Civic Platform
- Education: University of Wrocław
- Occupation: Politician
- Awards: Cross of Merit

Jarosław Wojciech Obremski (born June 14, 1962, in Wrocław) is a Polish local government official and politician, senator of the 8th and 9th terms, and Voivode of Lower Silesian Voivodeship from 2019 to 2023.

== Biography ==
=== Communist period ===
Since 1982, he was involved in independent initiatives in Wrocław, including distributing underground publications. In the mid-1980s, he participated in the Dominican Academic Chaplaincy "Dominik," led by Father Ludwik Wiśniewski, and chaired its council. In 1986, he was one of the founders and activists of the independent student government at the University of Wrocław, the so-called "Twelve".

In 1988, he graduated with a degree in chemistry from the Faculty of Mathematics, Physics, and Chemistry of the University of Wrocław. He then worked at the Department of Inorganic Chemistry at the Wrocław University of Economics (1987–1989), and simultaneously served as chairman of the Young Catholic Movement "U domu" (At Home). In 1989, he became a member of the Wrocław Citizens' Committee. In his own memoirs, he stated that the WKO considered putting forward his candidacy for parliament in the 1989 elections, but he decided against it for personal reasons.

=== Third Republic ===
From 1990 to 2002, he served as a councilor of the Wrocław City Council, and from 1990 to 1998, he was also a member of the Wrocław City Council. His responsibilities included housing and international cooperation (1990–1994), and then education and city promotion (1994–2001). From 1998 to 2001, he served as chairman of the Wrocław City Council. In 2001, he was also awarded the Bronze Cross of Merit.[4] From 2001 to 2011, he served as Vice-Mayor of Wrocław. As a local government official, he advocated for the construction of a new terminal at Wrocław Airport. He was a member of the Board of Curators of the Ossolineum Foundation and also served on the Council of the Jan Nowak-Jeziorański College of Eastern Europe in Wrocław.

He belonged successively to the Conservative Party, the Conservative People's Party, and the Civic Platform. He left the latter party in January 2009 due to the conflict between the Civic Platform and Wrocław Mayor Rafał Dutkiewicz.

In the 2011 elections, he was a candidate for the Senate in constituency no. 8, nominated by the Rafał Dutkiewicz Electoral Committee, a member of the Union of Presidents – Citizens for the Senate movement. He received 63,717 votes (41.89%), giving him first place in his district and a senatorial seat. His opponents were Leon Kieres and Kornel Morawiecki. In these elections, Jarosław Obremski was the only candidate from the Citizens' group to be elected to the upper house of the Polish parliament. He joined the Independent Senators' Circle and became involved with the Civic Lower Silesia association. In the 2014 European elections, he supported the Poland Together list.

In 2015, he successfully ran for re-election to the Senate, receiving 89,699 votes (60.55% of the vote in his district). He ran as an independent candidate with the support of the right-wing parties (including Law and Justice and Justice). In the Senate, he initially rejoined the National Senate Committee, but on May 19, 2016, he became a member of the Law and Justice party. In the 9th Senate, he became Vice-Chair of the Foreign Affairs and European Union Committee. In 2019, he was not re-elected for another term.

On November 29, 2019, he was recommended by the PiS regional authorities to serve as Voivode of the Lower Silesian Voivodeship. He assumed this office on December 5 of the same year. In 2023, he unsuccessfully ran for the Senate again as a PiS candidate. In December of the same year, he retired from office as Voivode.
