= Andrzej Maria Gołaś =

Polish politician and mayor

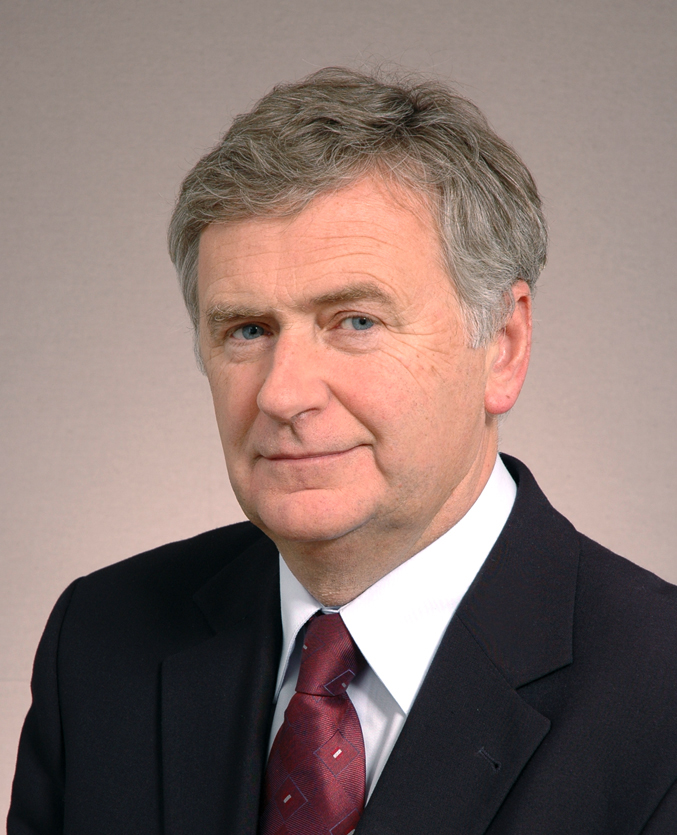
- Official portrait, 2005

46th Mayor of Kraków
- In office 4 November 1998 – 19 November 2002
- Preceded by: Józef Lassota
- Succeeded by: Jacek Majchrowski

Personal details
- Born: 30 September 1946 (age 79) Kraków, Poland
- Party: Civic Platform

Andrzej Maria Gołaś (born 30 September 1946) is a Polish politician. He is a former senator representing Civic Platform and a former mayor of Kraków (1998–2002).
