= Stanisław Kracik =

Polish politician and official (born 1950))

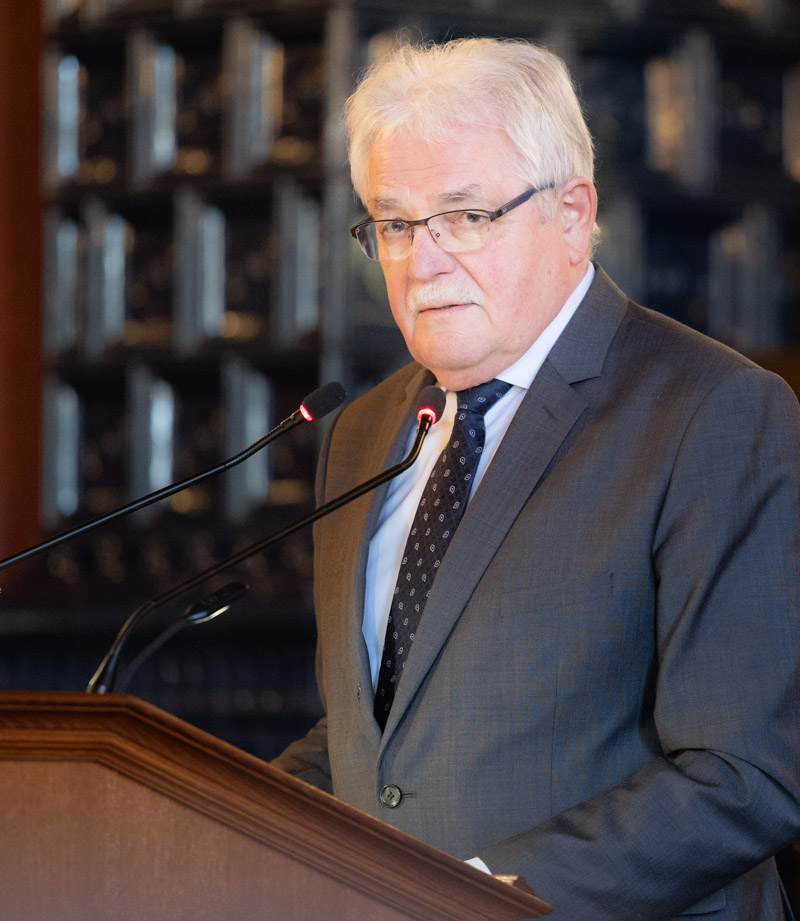
- Kracik in 2026

Mayor of the Royal Capital City of Kraków
- Acting
- In office 26 May 2026 – 20 October 2026
- Preceded by: Aleksander Miszalski
- Succeeded by: Łukasz Gibała

Voivode of Małopolska
- In office 29 October 2009 – 12 December 2011
- Preceded by: Jerzy Miller
- Succeeded by: Jerzy Miller

Personal details
- Born: 10 September 1950 (age 76) Spytkowice, Poland
- Party: Independent

Stanisław Kracik (born 10 September 1950) is a Polish politician, serving as Acting Mayor of Kraków between May and October of 2026.

== Biography ==
Brother of Jan Kracik. He graduated from the AGH University of Science and Technology in Kraków. From June 1990 he was the mayor of Niepołomice. From 1993 to 2001 he was a member of Sejm. From 2009 to 2011, he served as the Voivode of Małopolska, and from 2012 to 2021, he headed the Dr. Józef Babiński Clinical Hospital in Kraków. From June 2012 he was president of the Polish Red Cross. On 20 May 2024 he was appointed Third Deputy Mayor of the City of Kraków.

He was a member of the Democratic Union from 1991 to 1994 and member of the Freedom Union from 1994 to 2004. In 2011 he joined the Civic Platform.

== Awards ==
- Silver Cross of Merit (2005)
- Odznaka Honorowa za Zasługi dla Samorządu Terytorialnego (2015)
