= Krzysztof Klęczar =

Polish politician

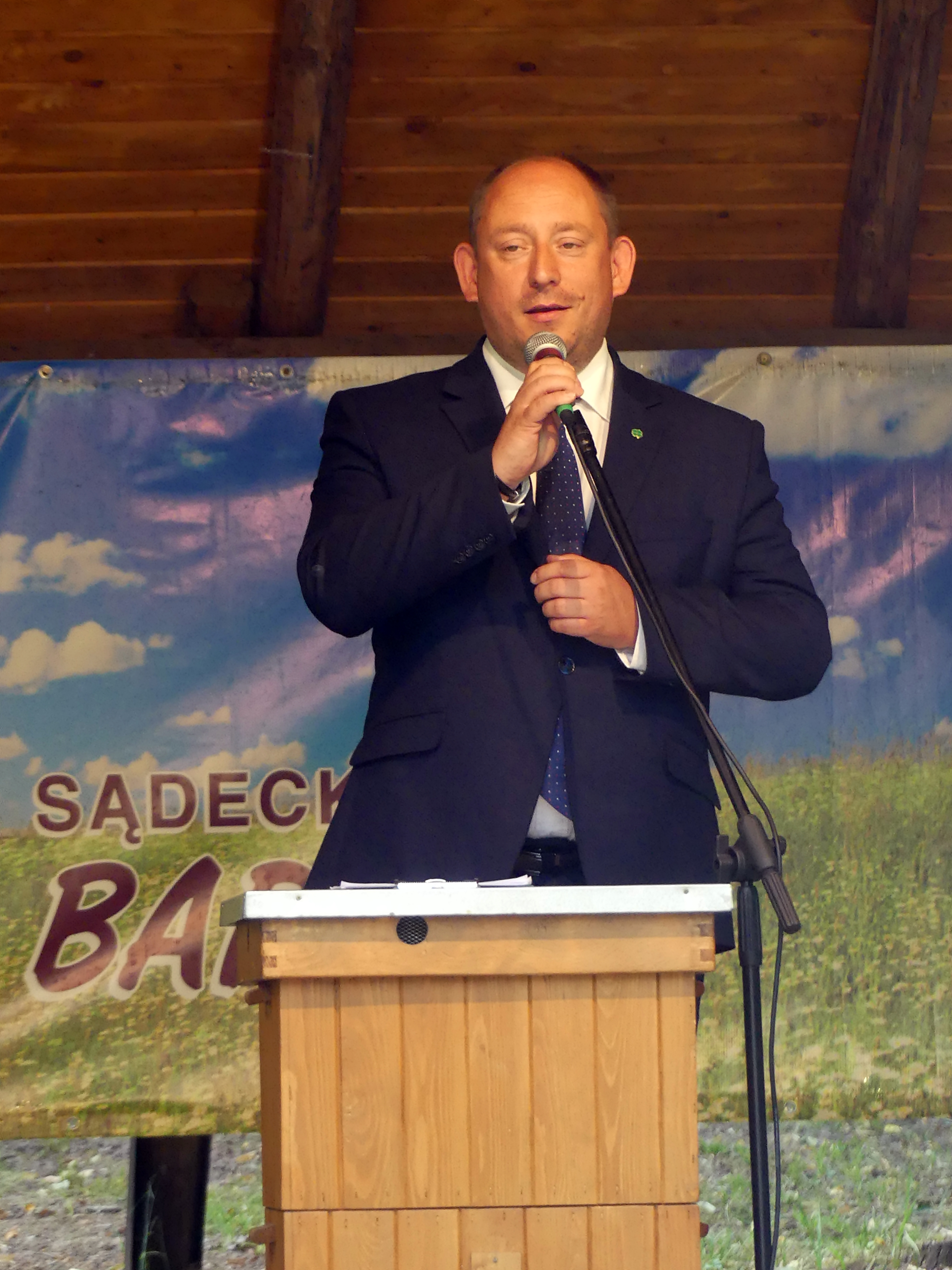

Voivode of Lesser Poland Voivodeship
- Incumbent
- Assumed office December 2023
- President: Andrzej Duda; Karol Nawrocki
- Prime Minister: Donald Tusk
- Preceded by: Łukasz Kmita

Personal details
- Born: 20 May 1982 (age 44) Oświęcim, Polish People's Republic
- Citizenship: Poland
- Party: Polish People's Party
- Education: Agricultural University of Kraków; SWPS University
- Occupation: Politician

Krzysztof Jan Klęczar (born 20 May 1982 in Oświęcim) is a Polish politician, animal scientist, and local government official, who served as mayor of Kęty from 2014 to 2023. From December 2023 he is serving as the Voivode of Lesser Poland Voivodeship.

== Biography ==
He was born in Oświęcim. He graduated with a degree in animal sciences from the Agricultural University of Kraków and a degree in psychology from SWPS University of Social Sciences and Humanities. In 2011, he earned a PhD in agricultural sciences (in the field of fisheries) from the Faculty of Animal Breeding and Biology of the Agricultural University of Kraków, based on his thesis entitled "The Effect of Lead on Body Growth and Concentration of Selected Metabolic Hormones in Carp". He was an employee of the Technology Transfer Center at the university.

In the 2010 elections, he was elected a city councilor in Kęty. In 2014, he was elected mayor of Kęty on behalf of the Porozumienie Prze Podziałami (Agreement Above Divisions) electoral committee, defeating Tomasz Bąk, who was seeking re-election. In 2018, he successfully ran for re-election, defeating Marek Błasiak of Law and Justice. An activist in the Polish People's Party, he became the party's chairman in the Małopolska Voivodeship in 2021 (replacing Andrzej Kosiniak-Kamysz). In the 2023 parliamentary elections, he unsuccessfully ran for the Senate on behalf of the Third Way party.

On December 13, 2023, he was appointed by Prime Minister Donald Tusk to the office of Małopolska Voivode (effective the following day), thus ending his term as mayor. In 2024, he unsuccessfully ran for the European Parliament from district no. 10. In July of that same year, he ran for the office of Marshal of the Lesser Poland Voivodeship, but his candidacy twice failed to secure a majority in the regional assembly.
