= Tadeusz Trzmiel =

Polish politician (born 1945)

Deputy Mayor of Kraków
- In office 19 November 2002 – November 2018
- Mayor: Jacek Majchrowski

Personal details
- Born: 1945 (age 80–81)
- Party: Independent

Tadeusz Trzmiel (born 1945) is the Polish politician who served as Deputy Mayor of Kraków between 2002 and 2018, under Mayor Jacek Majchrowski.
