= Sejm Constituency no. 3 =

Parliamentary constituency in Poland

Wrocław
- Polish: Okręg wyborczy Wrocław
- Constituency for the National Assembly of the Republic of Poland
- Boundary of the Wrocław Constituency in Poland for the 2011 general election.
- Counties in Lower Silesian Voivodeship: Góra, Milicz, Oleśnica, Oława, Strzelin, Środa, Trzebnica, Wołów, and Wrocław
- City Counties in Lower Silesian Voivodeship: Wrocław

Current constituency
- Sejm Deputies: 12
- Sejm District: 3
- European Parliament constituency: Lower Silesian and Opole
- Voivodeship sejmik: Lower Silesian Regional Assembly

Wrocław is a Polish parliamentary constituency in the Lower Silesian Voivodeship. It elects fourteen members of the Sejm.

The district has the number '3' and is named after the city of Wrocław. It includes the counties of Góra, Milicz, Oleśnica, Oława, Strzelin, Środa, Trzebnica, Wołów, and Wrocław, and the city county of Wrocław.

== List of deputies ==
Deputies for the 10th Sejm (2023–2027)
Deputy	Party	Parliamentary group
Michał Jaros	Civic Platform	Civic Coalition
Anna Sobolak	Civic Platform	Civic Coalition
Bogdan Zdrojewski	Civic Platform	Civic Coalition
Małgorzata Tracz	The Greens	Civic Coalition
Jolanta Niezgodzka	Modern	Civic Coalition
Alicja Chybicka	Independent	Civic Coalition
Paweł Hreniak	Law and Justice	Law and Justice
Agnieszka Soin	Law and Justice	Law and Justice
Mirosława Stachowiak-Różecka	Law and Justice	Law and Justice
Jacek Świat	Law and Justice	Law and Justice
Izabela Bodnar	Poland 2050	Poland 2050
Tomasz Zimoch	Poland 2050	Poland 2050
Krzysztof Śmiszek	New Left	The Left
Krzysztof Tuduj	Confederation	Confederation
