= Stefan Majchrowski =

Cavalry master of the Polish Army and writer

Stefan Majchrowski (13 March 1908 in Grodzisk Mazowiecki – 22 February 1988 in Warsaw, Poland) was a Polish writer.

Majchrowski fought in the Invasion of Poland of 1939. He was later captured and incarcerated in the German POW camp. After his liberation by American forces, he served in the Polish Armed Forces in the West.

In 2009, he was posthumously awarded by President Lech Kaczynski the Officer's Cross of the Order of Polonia Restituta "for outstanding contribution to the independence of the Polish Republic, for activities on behalf of democratic change in Poland as well as veterans and social activities for their performance in the work undertaken for the benefit of the country and social activities".

== Works ==
=== Biographical Stories ===
- Pan Sienkiewicz 1961
- Sienkiewicz 1975
- Pan Fredro 1965
- Opowieść o Józefie Wybickim 1973
- O Julianie Niemcewiczu. Opowieść biograficzna 1982
- Dickens. Opowieść biograficzna 1977
- Wincenty Pol 1982

=== Historical Novels ===
- Upiór spod Płocka 1974
- Awantury Pana na Jarczewie 1980
- Karczma na Moczydle 1975
- Narzeczona z Saragossy 1972
- Kopia i warkocze 1961
- Jezioro Czarownic 1968
- Taniec nad Jeziorem 1969

=== Contemporary Novels ===
- Przystanek za miastem 1965
- Współcześni czarownicy 1992

=== Children Novels ===
- Córka Księżyca 1970
- Spadkobiercy Pana Ziółko 1957
- Knot, Pocieszko i Spółka 1959
- Tajemnice wyspy Aotea 1961
