= Mirosława Stachowiak-Różecka =

Polish politician

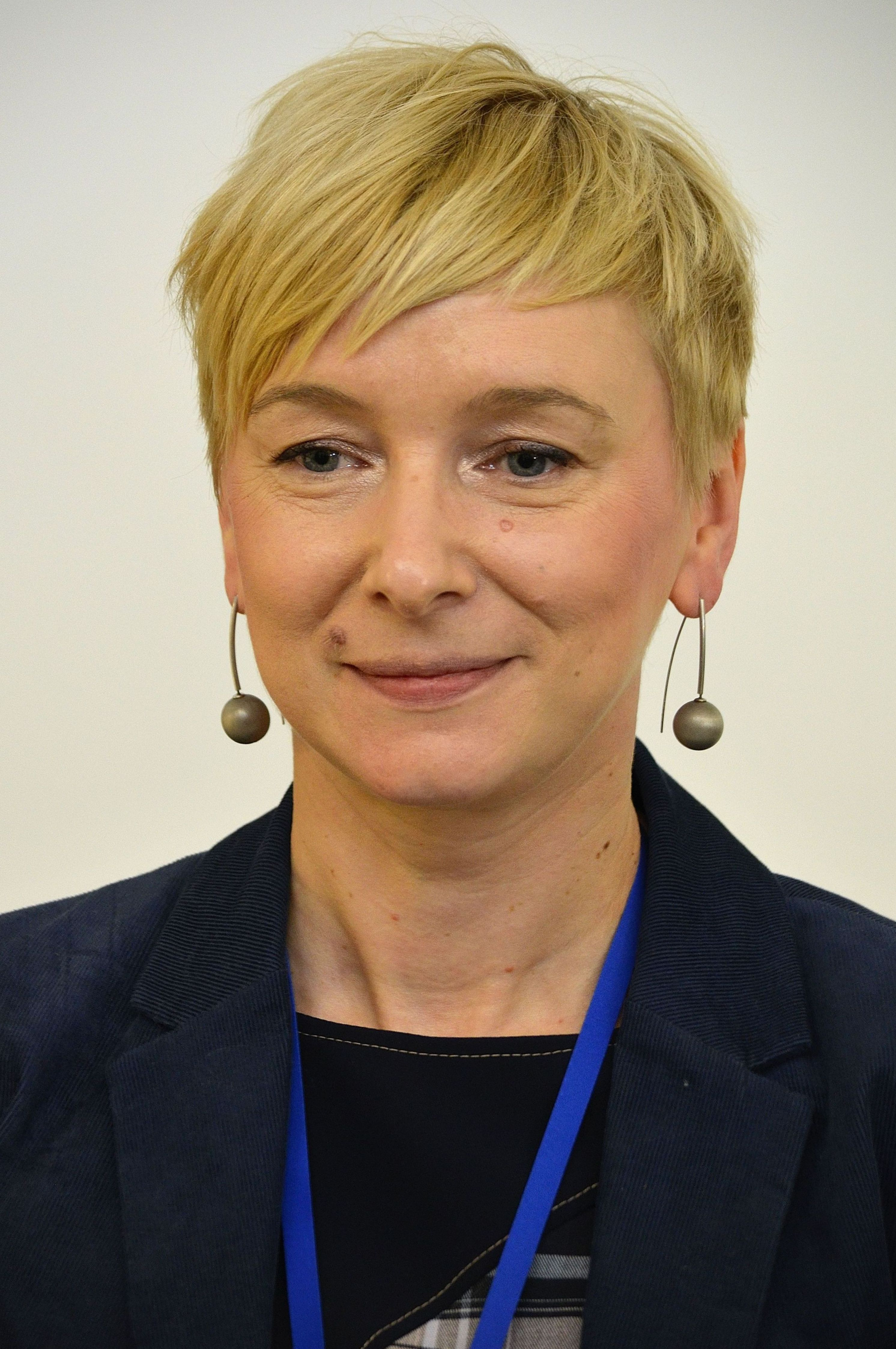

Member of the Sejm
- Incumbent
- Assumed office 12 November 2015

Personal details
- Born: 8 July 1973 (age 52)

Mirosława Agnieszka Stachowiak-Różecka (born 8 July 1973) is a Polish politician. She was elected to the Sejm (9th term) representing the constituency of Wrocław. She previously also served in the 8th term of the Sejm (2015–2019).
