= Michał Jaros =

Polish politician (born 1981)

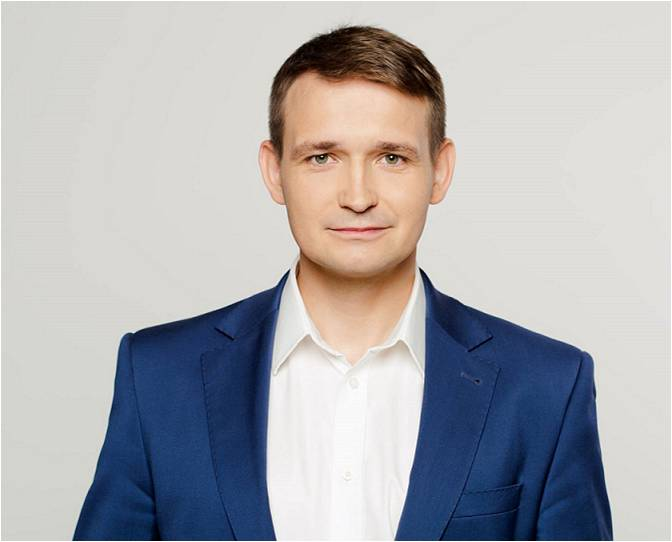
- Jaros in 2015

Member of the Sejm
- Incumbent
- Assumed office 5 November 2007
- Constituency: Wrocław

Deputy Ministry of Economic Development and Technology
- Incumbent
- Assumed office 15 October 2024

Personal details
- Born: 26 January 1981 (age 45)
- Party: Civic Platform

Michał Jaros (born 26 January 1981) is a Polish politician of the Civic Platform who has been a member of the Sejm since 2007. In 2021, he was elected leader of the Civic Platform in Lower Silesia.

== Honors ==
He was awarded the Georgian Order of Honor in 2011.
