= Małgorzata Wassermann =

Polish politician (born 1978)

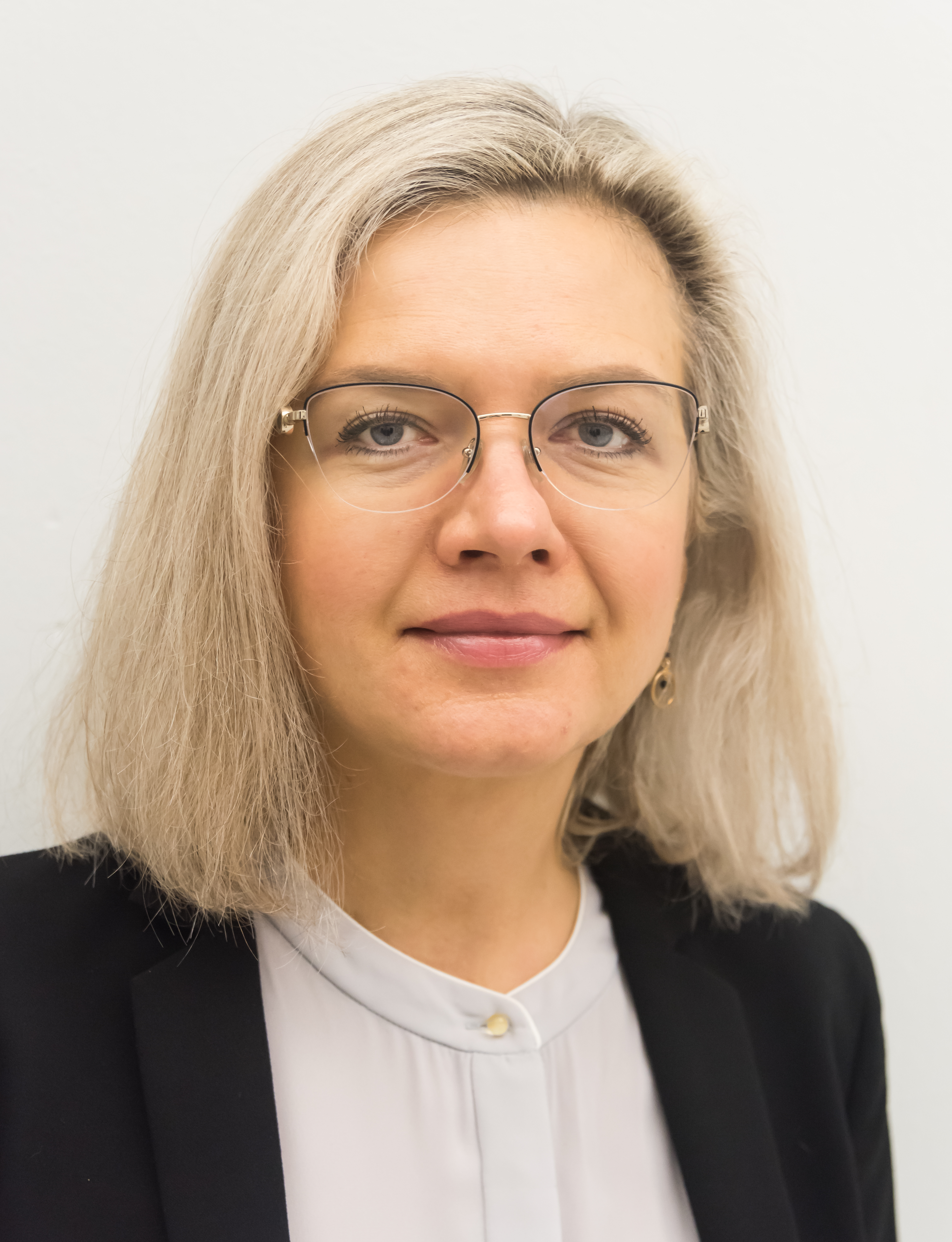
- Wassermann in 2022

Member of the Sejm
- Incumbent
- Assumed office 12 November 2015
- Constituency: Kraków

Personal details
- Born: 16 March 1978 (age 48)
- Party: Law and Justice
- Parent: Zbigniew Wassermann (father)

Małgorzata Ewa Wassermann (born 16 March 1978) is a Polish politician of Law and Justice. She has been a member of the Sejm since 2015, and was the candidate of Law and Justice for mayor of Kraków in 2018. She is the daughter of Zbigniew Wassermann, who died in the Smolensk air disaster in 2010.
