= Paweł Hreniak =

Polish politician (born 1979)

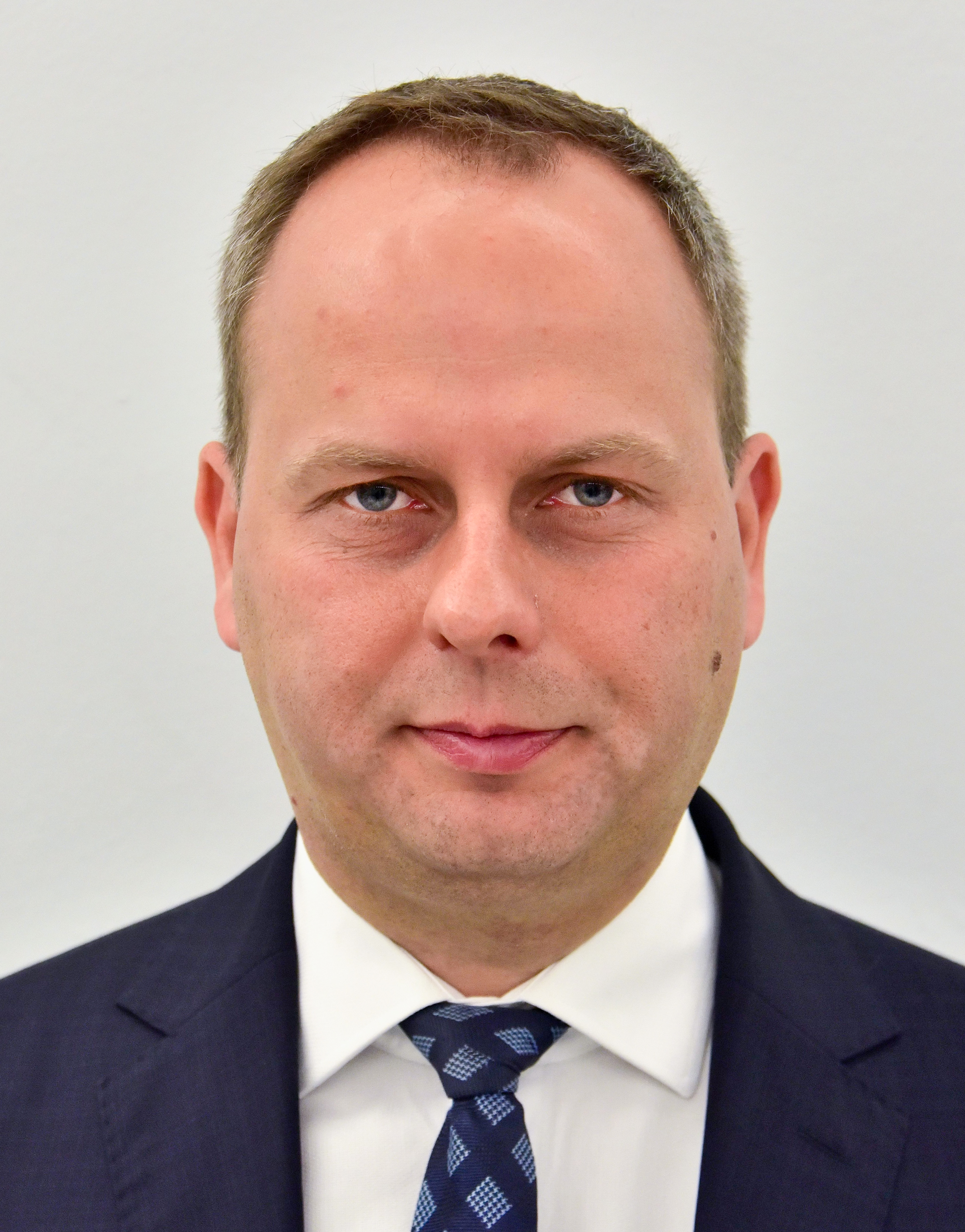
- Hreniak in 2019

Member of the Sejm
- Incumbent
- Assumed office 2019

Voivode of Lower Silesian Voivodeship
- In office 8 December 2015 – 11 November 2019
- Preceded by: Tomasz Smolarz
- Succeeded by: Jarosław Obremski

Personal details
- Born: 9 September 1979 (age 47) Wrocław, Poland
- Party: Law and Justice
- Children: 2
- Education: University of Wrocław
- Awards: Badge of Merit for Fire Protection; Medal of Merit for the Border Guard; Badge of Merit for the Customs Service; Pro Patria Medal

Paweł Marek Hreniak (born 9 September 1979) is a Polish politician, former voivode of the Lower Silesian Voivodeship (2015–2019), and member of the IX Sejm since 2019. He is a member of the Law and Justice political party. He represents the Nr. 3 (Wrocław) constituency.

Hreniak was born in Wrocław. He is married and has a son and daughter.
