= Krzysztof Tuduj =

Polish lawyer, activist, and politician

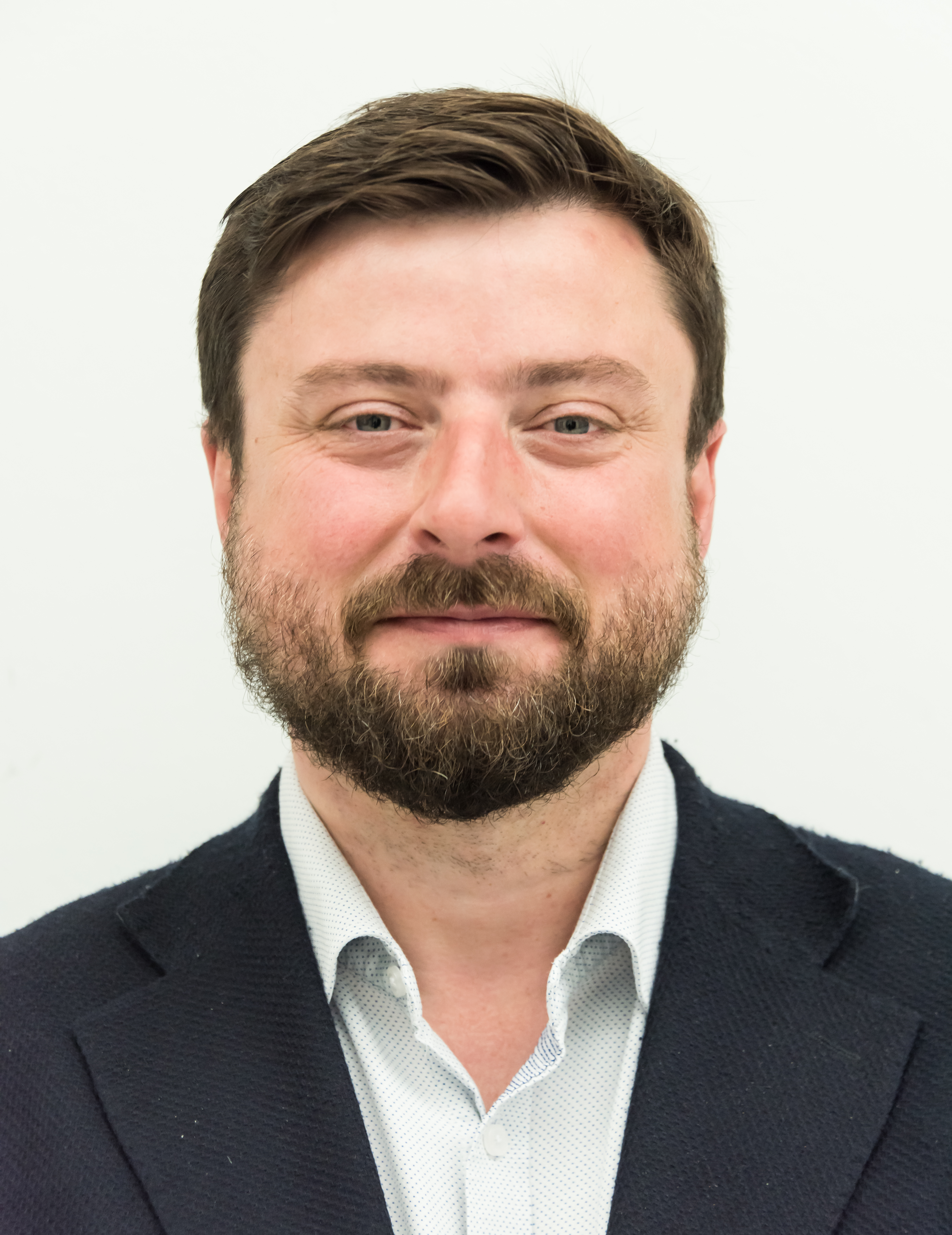
Krzysztof Tuduj in 2023

Krzysztof Tuduj (born 25 April 1981 in Warsaw) is a Polish lawyer, activist, and politician. He has been the second vice-chairman of the National Movement and a deputy in the Sejm since 2019.

In 2019, he was elected to Sejm, starting from the Confederation Freedom and Independence list in the Wrocław constituency.

He is married and raises foster children.
