= Łukasz Kmita =

Polish politician (born 1985)

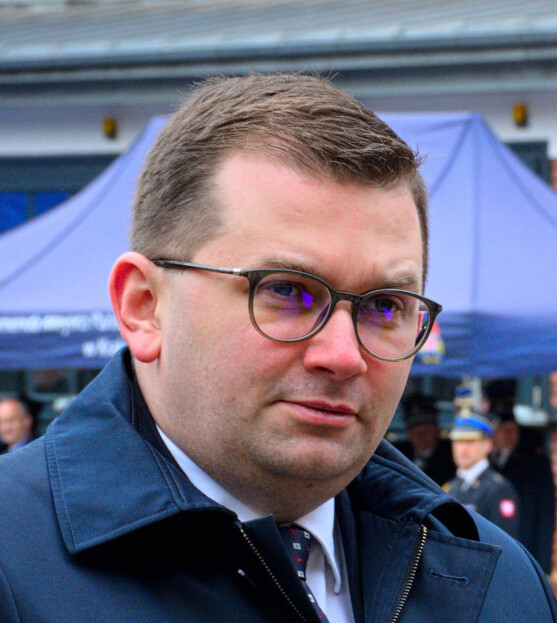
- Kmita in 2022

Member of the Sejm
- Incumbent
- Assumed office 13 November 2023
- Constituency: Kraków

Voivode of Lesser Poland Voivodeship
- In office 7 August 2020 – 2 November 2023
- Preceded by: Piotr Ćwik
- Succeeded by: Krzysztof Klęczar

Personal details
- Born: 7 November 1985 (age 40)
- Party: Law and Justice
- Education: Adam Mickiewicz University in Poznań

Łukasz Kmita (born 7 November 1985) is a Polish politician serving as a member of the Sejm since 2023. From 2020 to 2023, he served as Voivode of Lesser Poland Voivodeship.
