= Łukasz Gibała =

Polish politician (born 1977)

- Łukasz Gibała in 2026

Mayor of the Royal Capital City of Kraków
- Incumbent
- Assumed office 20 October 2026
- Preceded by: Aleksander Miszalski (Acting Stanisław Kracik)

Member of the Kraków City Council
- In office 21 November 2018 – 20 October 2026

Member of the Sejm
- In office 5 November 2007 – 11 November 2015
- Constituency: Kraków II

Personal details
- Born: 10 September 1977 (age 49)
- Party: Independent (since 2014); Kraków for Residents
- Other political affiliations: Civic Platform (2004–2012); Your Movement (2012–2014)
- Relatives: Jarosław Gowin (uncle)

Łukasz Gibała (born 10 September 1977) is a Polish politician serving as the Mayor of the Royal Capital City of Kraków since 2026, previously sitting in the Kraków City Council between 2018 and 2026. From 2007 to 2015, he was a member of the Sejm From 2006 to 2007, he was a member of the Lesser Poland Voivodeship Sejmik. He is the nephew of Jarosław Gowin. Since late 2014, he is the founder and leader of a localist organization Kraków for Residents.

== Biography ==
Gibała's political career begun in 2004 when he joined the Civic Platform (PO). In 2006 he was elected to the Lesser Poland Voivodeship Sejmik, becoming the head of the Committee for Regional Development, Promotion and International Cooperation, as well as a member of the Committee on the Budget, Property and Finance. A year later he ran in the 2007 parliamentary election, being elected to the Sejm from the PO's list. During his tenure, he was a member of the Committee on Administration and Internal Affairs, and the Committee on Constitutional Accountability. Between 2010 and 2012 he served as the leader of the Civic Platform in Kraków. In 2011 he was re-elected to the parliament from the same list. By March of 2012 he would switch his political affiliation to Palikot's Movement. Despite being elevated to the leadership council of the party, he'd resign from all positions by July of 2014.

Participating in the 2014 local elections, Gibała ran for the mayorship of Kraków. He would finish in third place, failing to advance to the second round. His electoral committee "Kraków: A City for People" would fail to elect any candidates to the Kraków City Council. In 2015 he would announce the formal creation of a local NGO Logical Alternative for Kraków (since 2019 known as Kraków for Residents), having registered it in December of the previous year. Prior to the 2015 parliamentary election, he'd form a committee "Independents for the Senate", placing 3 candidates (including himself) in constituencies within Lesser Poland. None would win, with Gibała himself securing third and last place.

In 2018 he would announce his intention to run in the 2018 Kraków elections. Despite failing to enter the second round of the mayoral election, Gibała would manage to enter the Kraków City Council from his own committee "Committee of Łukasz Gibała – Kraków for Residents". During the 2024 Kraków mayoral election, Gibała would emerge as a major challenger to Civic Coalition's Aleksander Miszalski, entering the second round with support from Left Together. Despite losing narrowly, his electoral committee would secure three additional seats in the Kraków City Council.

Following a recall of the Kraków mayor Aleksander Miszalski in 2026, Gibała would register his candidacy for the mayoral election, winning in a landslide against the Civic Coalition's candidate Monika Piątkowska and being elected as the next mayor of Kraków.
