= Mayor of Kraków =

Polish municipal office (1792–2026)

Mayor of the Royal Capital City of Kraków
- Coat of arms of Kraków
- Incumbent; Łukasz Gibała
- Inaugural holder: Franciszek Wielopolski
- Formation: 14 April 1792
- Website: krakow.pl

The following is the list of the Mayors of the Royal Capital City of Kraków, Poland; heads of local municipal government (Polish: Prezydent Stołecznego Królewskiego Miasta Krakowa) according to extant records. Most have been elected by inhabitants, with notable exceptions, such as mayors mandated by foreign authorities during various types of militarised control of the city such as Partitions or the Nazi German occupation of Poland.

== List of mayors ==
For names in alphabetical order use table sort buttons
Name of Mayor (President) in Office	From	Until
Franciszek Wielopolski	14 April 1792	11 September 1792
Maciej Bajer	12 September 1792	5 March 1794
Filip Nereusz Lichocki	6 March 1794	23 April 1794
Michał Wohlman	24 April 1794	14 June 1794
Maciej Bajer	15 June 1794	31 October 1798
Filip Nereusz Lichocki	1 November 1798	31 August 1802
Dominik Drdatzki	1 September 1802	1805
Józef Gollmayer	1805	1810
Stanisław Kostka Zarzecki	1 December 1810	2 November 1815
Józef Matecki	1 January 1816	11 April 1816
Feliks Grodzicki	11 April 1816	31 July 1816
Józef Walenty Krzyżanowski	7 October 1848	19 April 1849
Ignacy Paprocki	19 April 1849	27 June 1853
Fryderyk Tobiaszek	1 July 1853	28 August 1856
Andrzej Seidler-Wiślański	26 October 1856	12 September 1866
Józef Dietl	13 September 1866	18 June 1874
Mikołaj Zyblikiewicz	2 July 1874	7 February 1881
Ferdynand Weigel	17 February 1881	17 September 1884
Feliks Szlachtowski	17 September 1884	10 May 1893
Józef Friedlein	24 May 1893	7 July 1904
Juliusz Leo	11 July 1904	21 February 1918
Jan Kanty Federowicz	6 March 1918	13 July 1924
Zdzisław Wawrausch	21 July 1924	18 July 1925
Witold Ostrowski	21 July 1925	4 June 1926
Karol Rolle	19 June 1926	13 July 1931
Władysław Belina-Prażmowski	16 July 1931	11 February 1933
Mieczysław Kaplicki	16 February 1933	1 February 1939
Bolesław Czuchajowski	21 April 1939	3 September 1939
Stanisław Klimecki	3 September 1939	20 September 1939
Ernst Zörner	20 September 1939	22 February 1940
Karl Schmid (Nazi)	23 February 1940	March 1941
Rudolf Pavlu	April 1941	April 1943
Josef Krämer (Nazi)	April 1943	18 January 1945
Aleksander Żaruk-Michalski	21 January 1945	2 February 1945
Alfred Fiderkiewicz	5 February 1945	11 June 1945
Stefan Wolas	14 June 1945	6 October 1947
Henryk Dobrowolski	6 October 1947	6 June 1950
Marcin Waligóra	6 June 1950	7 April 1954
Tadeusz Mrugacz	7 April 1954	24 October 1957
Wiktor Boniecki	24 October 1957	6 November 1959
Zbigniew Skolicki	6 November 1959	5 June 1969
Jerzy Pękala	6 June 1969	26 April 1978
Edward Barszcz	27 April 1978	20 June 1980
Józef Gajewicz	26 September 1980	8 December 1982
Tadeusz Salwa	9 December 1982	13 January 1990
Jerzy Rościszewski	9 February 1990	20 June 1990
Jacek Woźniakowski	20 June 1990	11 January 1991
Krzysztof Bachmiński	7 February 1991	30 September 1992
Józef Lassota	9 October 1992	4 November 1998
Andrzej Gołaś	4 November 1998	19 November 2002
Jacek Majchrowski	19 November 2002	7 May 2024
Aleksander Miszalski	7 May 2024	24 May 2026
Direct Government Rule (Enforced by Commissioner Stanisław Kracik)	24 May 2026	20 October 2026
Łukasz Gibała	20 October 2026	Present

== See also ==
- Timeline of Kraków

== Notes and references ==
- Prezydenci miasta Krakowa, bądź osoby pełniące tę funkcję (mirror). Szkolnictwo.pl, 2008

== Bibliography ==
- Professor Jan Marian Małecki (b. 1926), Dzieje Krakowa (originally in several volumes). Wyd. Kraków, 1984.
