= Lesser Poland Voivodeship Sejmik =

Lesser Poland Voivodeship Sejmik Sejmik Województwa Małopolskiego

Type
- Type: Unicameral

Leadership
- Chairperson: Jan Tadeusz Duda, PiS
- Vice-Chairpersons: Wojciech Skruch, Jadwiga Wójtowicz, Stanisław Pasoń
- Marshal: Łukasz Smółka, PiS

Structure
- Seats: 39 councillors
- Political groups: Executive board (21): PiS (21); PiS (21); Opposition (18): PO (12); PSL (4); P2050 (2)

Elections
- Last election: 7 April 2024

Meeting place
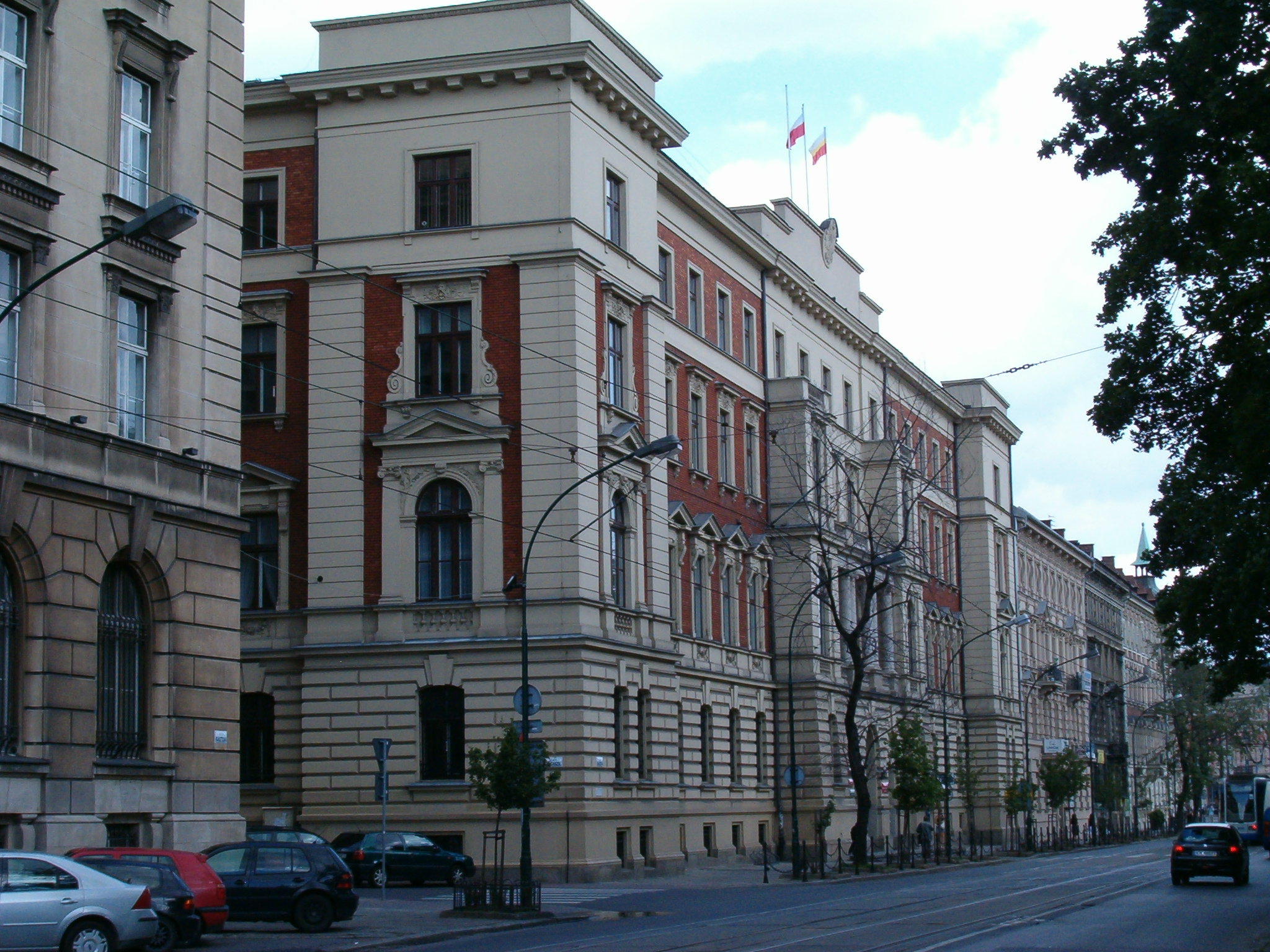
- Marshal's Office, Kraków

Website
- Lesser Poland Regional Assembly

The Lesser Poland Voivodeship Sejmik (Polish: Sejmik Województwa Małopolskiego) is the regional legislature of the Voivodeship of Lesser Poland. It is a unicameral parliamentary body consisting of thirty-nine councillors elected to five-year terms. The current chairperson of the assembly is Jan Tadeusz Duda.

The assembly elects the executive board that acts as the collective executive for the regional government, headed by the province's marshal. The current Executive Board of Lesser Poland is held by the Law and Justice party, headed by Marshal Łukasz Smółka.

The assembly convenes within the Marshal's Office in Kraków.

== Districts ==
Members of the Lesser Poland Regional Assembly are elected from six districts, serving five-year terms. Districts do not have formal names. Instead, each constituency has a number and territorial description.

Number	Seats	City counties	Land counties
1	5	None	Chrzanów, Olkusz, Oświęcim
2	5	None	Kraków, Miechów, Proszowice, Wieliczka
3	9	Kraków	None
4	7	None	Myślenice, Nowy Targ, Sucha, Tatra, Wadowice
5	7	Tarnów	Bochnia, Brzesko, Dąbrowa, Tarnów
6	6	Nowy Sącz	Gorlice, Limanowa, Nowy Sącz

== See also ==
- Polish Regional Assembly
- Lesser Poland Voivodeship

== Charts ==
1998

2006

2010

2014

2018
