= Aleksander Miszalski =

Polish politician (born 1980)

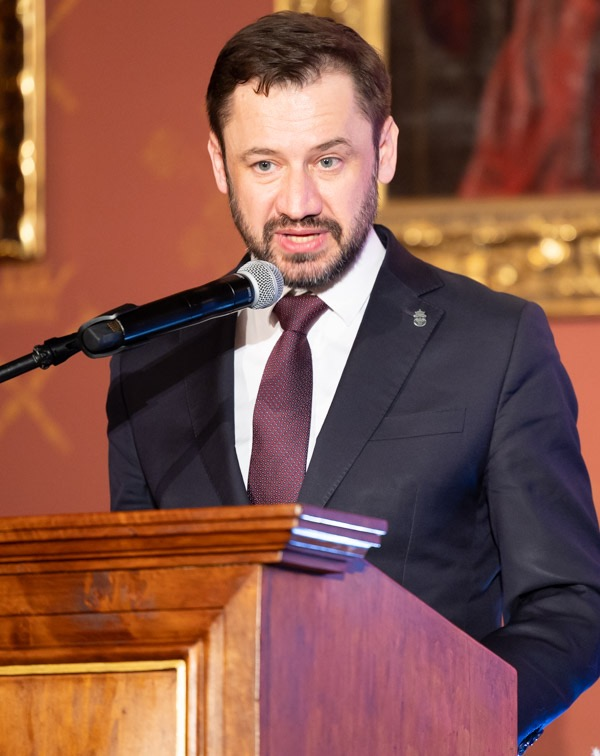
- Miszalski in 2026

Mayor of the Royal Capital City of Kraków
- In office 7 May 2024 – 26 May 2026
- Preceded by: Jacek Majchrowski
- Succeeded by: Stanisław Kracik (Acting) Łukasz Gibała

Member of the Sejm
- In office 12 November 2019 – 24 April 2024
- Succeeded by: Dominik Jaśkowiec
- Constituency: Kraków

Personal details
- Born: 7 August 1980 (age 46) Kraków, Poland
- Party: Civic Coalition

Aleksander Miszalski (born 7 August 1980) is a Polish politician who served as mayor of Kraków between 2024 and 2026. From 2019 to 2024, he was a member of the Sejm.

Miszalski was born and educated in Kraków. He holds three master's degrees from leading Kraków institutions: in international relations from the University of Economics, in sociology from the Jagiellonian University, and in tourism and recreation from the Academy of Physical Education. In 2024, he earned a PhD from the University of Economics in Kraków.

His political career began in 2006. Although his first bid for a local council seat was unsuccessful, he was elected as a city councillor in 2010, serving until 2018, when he became an MP in the Polish Parliament with the Civic Coalition (KO). In 2024, he returned to local politics and was elected Mayor of Kraków, succeeding Jacek Majchrowski. He took office on 7 May 2024. On 24 May 2026, Miszalski was recalled from office via referendum with support of his dismissal narrowly reaching the required turnout threshold.
