= Jacek Majchrowski =

Polish politician

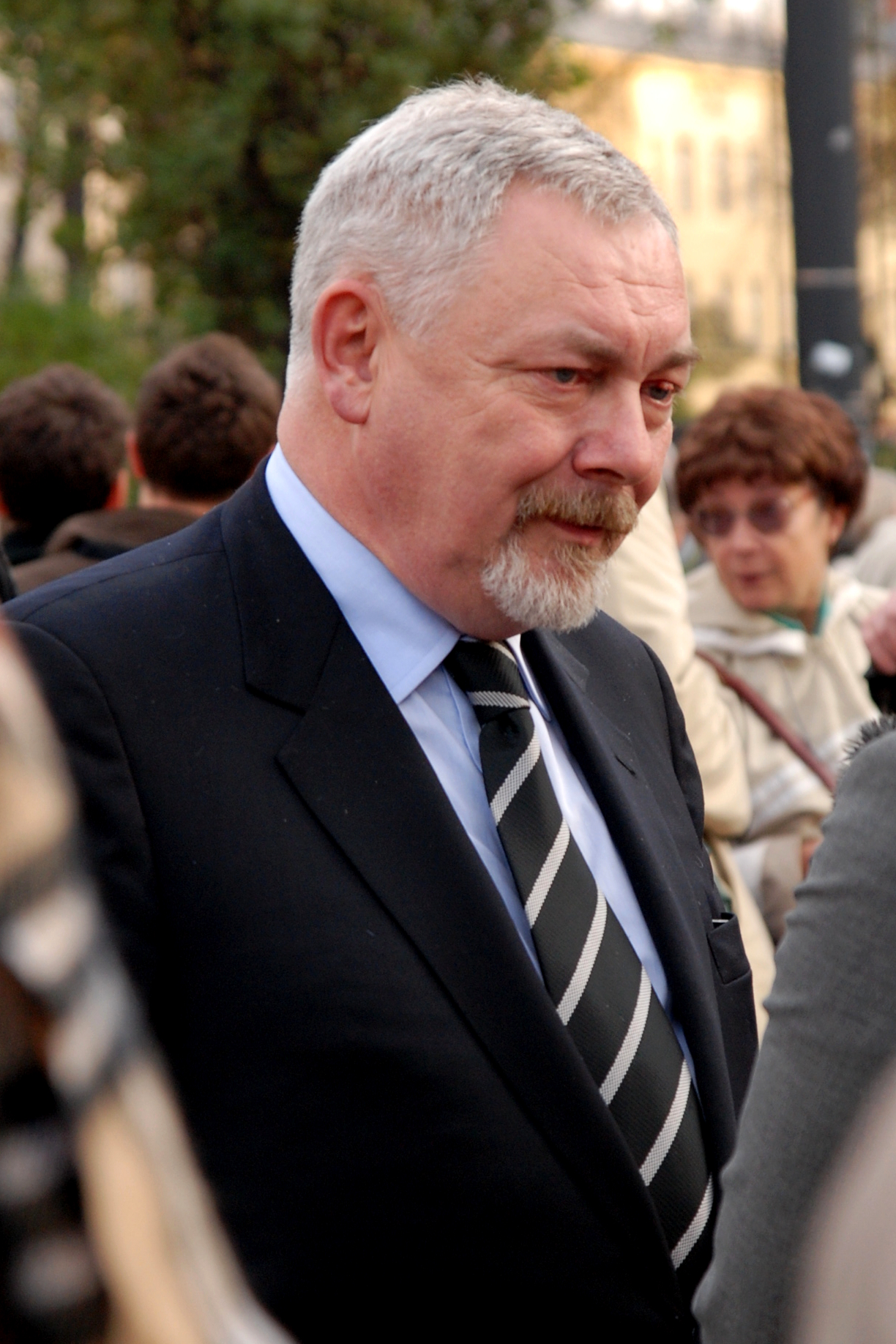
- Majchrowski in 2008

Mayor of the Royal Capital City of Kraków
- In office 19 November 2002 – 7 May 2024
- Deputy: Tadeusz Trzmiel (2002–2018)
- Preceded by: Andrzej Maria Gołaś
- Succeeded by: Aleksander Miszalski

Personal details
- Born: 13 January 1947 (age 79) Sosnowiec, Poland
- Party: Independent (since 2002); Democratic Left Alliance (1999–2002); Polish United Workers' Party (1965–1981)

Jacek Maria Majchrowski (born 13 January 1947) is a Polish politician, lawyer, historian, and professor at the Jagiellonian University, who served as the Mayor of Kraków between 2002 and 2024.

== Biography ==
Majchrowski was born on 13 January 1947 in Sosnowiec. In 1999 he joined Democratic Left Alliance, but suspended his membership for the duration of his mayorship in Kraków. He has written 14 history books, specializing mostly in the history of Polish political thought and doctrines. On 7 December 2015, he became co-president of the Council of European Municipalities and Regions.

== Selected awards ==
- Silver Medal for Merit to Culture – Gloria Artis (Poland, 2005)
- Order of Merit of the Kingdom of Hungary (Hungary, 2009)
- Commander's Cross with Star of the Order of Polonia Restituta (Poland, 2011)
- Decoration of Honour for Services to the Republic of Austria (Austria, 2012)
- Order of Saint-Charles (Monaco, 2012)
- Knight's Cross of the Legion of Honour (France, 2013)
- Grand Cross of the Order of Polonia Restituta (Poland, 2025)

== Works ==
- Geneza politycznych ugrupowań katolickich: Stronnictwo Pracy, grupa "Dziś i Jutro" (1984)
- Silni - zwarci - gotowi: Myśl polityczna Obozu Zjednoczenia Narodowego (1985)
- Szkice z historii polskiej prawicy politycznej lat Drugiej Rzeczypospolitej (1986)
- Ugrupowania monarchistyczne w latach Drugiej Rzeczypospolitej (Monarchist Groups in the Second Republic) (1988)
- Ulubieniec Cezara: Bolesław Wieniawa-Długoszowski: Zarys biografii (1990)
- Polska myśl polityczna XIX i XX wieku. Cz. 1, U źródeł nacjonalizmu: Myśl wszechpolska (1990)
- Polska myśl polityczna XIX i XX wieku. Cz. 3, Nacjonalizm: Myśl "potomstwa obozowego" (1993)
- Pierwszy ułan drugiej Rzeczypospolitej: O generale Wieniawie-Długoszowskim (1993)
- Polska myśl polityczna 1918-1939: Nacjonalizm (Polish Political Thought 1918-1939: Nationalism) (2000)
- Pierwsza Kompania Kadrowa: Portret oddziału (2002, 2004)
