= 2026 Kraków mayoral election =

2026 mayoral election in Kraków, held after the recall of Aleksander Miszalski

- 27 September 2026 (first round); 11 October 2026 (second round)
- Turnout: 43.50% (first round) ▼8.29pp 44.27% (second round) ▼1.23pp

Candidate	Łukasz Gibała	Monika Piątkowska
Party	Independent (Note: Independent candidate supported and backed by Kraków for Residents.)	Civic Coalition
Popular vote	161,184	98,306
Percentage	62.12%	37.88%
President before election
Stanisław Kracik (Acting)
Independent
Elected President
Łukasz Gibała
Independent

The 2026 Kraków mayoral election was held on 27 September 2026 in Kraków to fill a vacancy left after the recall of Aleksander Miszalski of the liberal Civic Coalition (KO) on 24 May 2026. The second round, between the independent candidate Łukasz Gibała and the Civic Coalition candidate Monika Piątkowska, took place on 11 October 2026. Gibała, a 4-time mayoral candidate and a member of Kraków City Council, defeated Piątkowska in the runoff in a landslide, by a margin of 62,878 (24.24pp) votes.

== Electoral system ==
Snap mayoral elections are held earlier if the office becomes vacant due to the death, resignation, or removal of the incumbent. In this case, they are held within 90 days of the premature end of a mayoral term. The Prime Minister of Poland is responsible for setting the date of a snap mayoral election. However, the election may also take place after the 90-day deadline due to legal protests against the election filed with a court. After an election complaint which allowed the extension of the 90-day deadline, the date of the snap election was set to 126 days following the recall—27 September. In the time between the recall and snap election, the commissar—acting president of the city president—fulfills the office's administrative roles for the period of the vacancy. The office of commissar is appointed by the Prime Minister.

The city president is elected for using the two-round system; if no candidate receives a majority of the vote in the first round, a run-off is held between the top two candidates. The city president-elect takes the oath of office before the City Council.

In order to be registered to contest the election, a candidate must be a Polish citizen, be at least 25 years old on the day of the first round of the election, a candidate must have collected at least 3,000 voters' signatures. However, there is no formal requirement to be a permanent resident of the city.

== Background ==
Aleksander Miszalski was elected City president of Kraków in the 2024 Kraków mayoral election. In the runoff, he narrowly defeated Łukasz Gibała, receiving 51% of the vote. However, Miszalski became increasingly unpopular in the office. Between September 2025 and February 2026, his disapproval rating rose from 28.5% to 59.7%. He was criticized for the increasing city debt, cronyism, not fulfilling election promises, introducing a "Clean Transport Zone", (Note: "Clean Transport Zone" refers to banning old cars from regions of the city. While Kraków was legally obligated to introduce one due to pollution, its implementation details such as coverage area were up to the city.) increased public transport ticket prices, paid parking on Sunday and his "personal style". An internal poll commissioned by the Kraków City Office showed that 57.4% considered the Clean Transport Zone "too restrictive". In March 2026, the citizens of Kraków started an initiative to recall the city president and city council. By the signature collection deadline in March, the initiative received 134 thousand signatures, significantly more than the required 58 thousand.

=== Recall referendum ===
Rather than instructing his supporters to vote against the referendum, Miszalski called for a boycott, seeking to bring it under the required turnout threshold of 27%. However, shortly before the election, OGB projected a turnout of 27.0–33.0%. An OGB exit poll for Polsat News conducted on election day projected an initial turnout of 33.4%, although OGB reduced the projection to 31.8% in a late poll. The ultimate turnout was 30.0%, which was sufficient to recall Miszalski, but not enough to recall the city council. Nationally, Miszalski's dismissal was largely expected (Note: An SW Research poll for Zero.pl conducted on 12–13 May 2026 found that 36.8% of Poles believed the recall referendum against Miszalski would succeed, while 22.1% thought it would not.) and supported. (Note: An SW Research poll for Wprost conducted in May 2026 found that 37.8% of Poles desired Miszalski's dismissal, while 18.0% wanted him to remain in his office.) The vast majority of Poles — 48.5% — also determined the referendum result to be a failure for the Civic Coalition, while 25.6% thought it was not. As a result of the success of the referendum, the Civic Coalition dissolved its party structures in Lesser Poland, including Kraków, resulting in Miszalski losing his seat as the chairman of the Voivodeship chapter of the party.

The OGB exit poll in Kraków found that the main motivation behind referendum participants voting to recall Miszalski were disagreement with introduction of the "Clean Transport Zone" (for 28.3% of respondents), the level of debt (22.0%), budget management and nepotism (14.3%), rising cost of living (10.5%), disagreement with the direction of the city (9.7%), the rise in public transport prices (8.9%), unfulfilled election promiess (2.5%), the difficult situation on the labor market (2.1%) and disappointment with the speed of changes in Kraków (1.7%). 74% of respondents voted mostly out of disagreement with the city administration, while 26% voted mostly out of disagreement with the government of Donald Tusk.

The recall referendum for Kraków's mayor and city council was held on 24 May 2026. The referendums required turnout of 3/5ths of the number of votes cast in the 2024 local elections to be valid, with the threshold being set at 159 thousand votes for the mayoral recall referendum (3/5ths of the second round votes in the 2024 mayoral election) and 180 thousand votes for the city council recall referendum (3/5ths of the votes in the election for city council). The required threshold was met for the mayoral recall referendum, but the city council recall referendum, in spite of the exit poll showing otherwise, came 4 thousand votes short of success. The option to recall won overwhelmingly in both referendums. Prime Minister Donald Tusk appointed Stanisław Kracik as the commissar (acting president) of Kraków on 26 May. Miszalski's recall was the second successful referendum in a city during the 2024–2029 term, following the 2025 Zabrze mayoral election.

==== Mayoral recall referendum ====
Choice	Votes	%
For	171,581	97.93
Against	3,631	2.07
Total	175,212	100.00
Valid votes	175,212	99.42
Invalid/blank votes	1,016	0.58
Total votes	176,228	100.00
Registered voters/turnout	587,637	29.99

==== City council recall referendum ====
Choice	Votes	%
For	168,010	96.16
Against	6,713	3.84
Total	174,723	100.00
Valid votes	174,723	99.21
Invalid/blank votes	1,384	0.79
Total votes	176,107	100.00
Registered voters/turnout	587,637	29.97

== Candidate selection ==
=== Registered candidates ===
Name	Born	Last position/job	Party	Endorsed by
Michał Drewnicki	13 March 1990 (36); Kraków, Lesser Poland	Member of the Kraków City Council (2014–present)	Law and Justice	
Łukasz Gibała	10 September 1977 (49); Kraków, Lesser Poland	Member of the Kraków City Council (2018–present)	Independent	Kraków for Residents
Daria Gosek-Popiołek	16 April 1985 (41); Sosnowiec, Silesia	Member of the Sejm (2019–present)	Independent	Common Tomorrow
Daria Gosek-Popiołek	16 April 1985 (41); Sosnowiec, Silesia	Member of the Sejm (2019–present)	Independent	New Left
Daria Gosek-Popiołek	16 April 1985 (41); Sosnowiec, Silesia	Member of the Sejm (2019–present)	Independent	Polish Socialist Party
Jan Hoffman	1984; Kraków, Lesser Poland	Member of the District I Council – Stare Miasto (2018–present); Leader of District I Council – Stare Miasto (2023–present)	Independent	
Michał Klimek	3 July 1972 (54); Kraków, Lesser Poland		Confederation of the Polish Crown	Confederation of the Polish Crown
Michał Klimek	3 July 1972 (54); Kraków, Lesser Poland		Confederation of the Polish Crown	KORWiN
Michał Klimek	3 July 1972 (54); Kraków, Lesser Poland		Confederation of the Polish Crown	Bezpartyjni Samorządowcy
Michał Klimek	3 July 1972 (54); Kraków, Lesser Poland		Confederation of the Polish Crown	PolExit
Aleksandra Owca	25 June 1992 (34); Kraków, Lesser Poland	Member of the Kraków City Council (2024–present); Co-leader of Together Party (2024–present)	Together Party	
Monika Piątkowska	18 August 1974 (52); Zakopane, Lesser Poland	Member of the Senate (2025–present)	Civic Coalition	Civic Coalition
Monika Piątkowska	18 August 1974 (52); Zakopane, Lesser Poland	Member of the Senate (2025–present)	Civic Coalition	Polish People's Party
Sławomir Pietrzyk	24 November 1950 (75); Kielce, Świętokrzyskie	Member of the Kraków City Council (2002–2006; 2010–2024)	Independent	Social Democracy of Poland
Sławomir Pietrzyk	24 November 1950 (75); Kielce, Świętokrzyskie	Member of the Kraków City Council (2002–2006; 2010–2024)	Independent	New Wave
Sławomir Pietrzyk	24 November 1950 (75); Kielce, Świętokrzyskie	Member of the Kraków City Council (2002–2006; 2010–2024)	Independent	Volt Poland

=== Candidate registration ===
Registration of candidates in the by-election began on 3 August 2026. After establishing a committee by notifying the electoral commissar, a committee must deliver 3,000 support signatures to register a candidate in the election.

Electoral committees
Committee	Candidate	Status	Date
Łukasz Wantuch KWW Nonpartisan and Independent	Łukasz Wantuch	Candidacy rejected	CE 3 August
Jan Hoffman KWW - ReferendumKRK: WE will fix Kraków	Jan Hoffman	Candidate registered	CE 3 August; CR 3 September
KW Razem	Aleksandra Owca	Candidate registered	CE 3 August; CR 1 September
KW Repair Poland Movement	Romuald Starosielec	Candidacy rejected	CE 3 August
Bartosz Bocheńczak KWW - Confederation - Reclaim Kraków	Bartosz Bocheńczak	Candidacy rejected	CE 3 August
KW New Left	Daria Gosek-Popiołek	Candidate registered	CE 4 August; CR 8 August
KW Association of Bezpartyjni Samorządowcy in Lesser Poland	Grażyna Zofia Świat	Candidate withdrew	CE 4 August; CW 25 August
Marian Banaś KWW	Marian Banaś	Candidacy rejected	CE 4 August
KW Normal Country	—	Candidacy rejected	CE 4 August
Łukasz Gibała KWW - Kraków for Residents	Łukasz Gibała	Candidate registered	CE 5 August; CR 4 September
KW Social Democracy of Poland	Sławomir Pietrzyk	Candidate registered	CE 5 August; CR 8 August
Monika Piątkowska KWW - Beyond Divisions (Note: Monika Piątkowska is a member of the Civic Coalition and her candidacy is additionally supported by the Polish People's Party.)	Monika Piątkowska	Candidate registered	CE 5 August; CR 3 September
KW PolExit	—	Candidacy rejected	CE 6 August
Stanisław Kułach KWW	Stanisław Kułach	Candidacy rejected	CE 6 August
KW Law and Justice (Note: Michał Drewnicki was additionally supported by Development Plus, although Development Plus withdrew their endorsement in September.)	Michał Drewnicki	Candidate registered	CE 7 August; CR 1 September
KW Self-Defence	—	Candidacy rejected	CE 10 August
Grzegorz Piątkowski KWW - Kraków Community	Grzegorz Piątkowski	Candidacy rejected	CE 10 August
Zbigniew Burzyński KWW	Zbigniew Burzyński	Candidacy rejected	CE 10 August
KW Confederation of the Polish Crown (Note: Michał Klimek is additionally supported by KORWiN.)	Michał Klimek	Candidate registered	CE 12 August; CR 7 September
KW Free and Solidary	—	Candidacy rejected	CE 12 August
Marta Ratuszyńska KWW Kraków Fairytale (Note: Marta Ratuszyńska is a member of the Good Radom party.)	Marta Ratuszyńska	Candidacy rejected	CE 12 August
Marianna Schreiber KWW	Marianna Schreiber	Candidacy rejected	CE 17 August
KWW Kraków Thought and Mathematical History	—	Committee disbanded	CE 17 August; CD 24 August
KWW Together Change District XII	—	Candidacy rejected	CE 17 August

== Campaign issues ==
Prominent campaign issues regarded Kraków's city debt, the Clean Transport Zone, cronyism and the long-term plan for the city. Due to the status of the by-election, the national political competition was also relevant in the Kraków political campaign, shown in the competition between Aleksandra Owca of Razem and Daria Gosek-Popiołek of the New Left.

== Campaign ==
=== First round ===
In spite of the election not being called yet, several candidates already began their campaign by July. Several ministers appeared to promote Monika Piątkowska in the campaign: Prime Minister Donald Tusk on 20 August and 24 September, Minister of National Defence Władysław Kosiniak-Kamysz on 27 August, Minister of Energy Miłosz Motyka on 24 September, Minister of Sport and Tourism Jakub Rutnicki on 2 October, and Minister of Foreign Affairs Radosław Sikorski on 3 October.

On 23 September, Jan Hoffman withdrew from the election and endorsed Gibała. However, his name would remain on the ballot as the ballot papers have already been printed.

Law and Justice nominated Michał Drewnicki as its candidate. Political observers noted that Drewnicki was an inoffensive candidate, and was not connected to any scandals nor ideological conflicts within Law and Justice. While Drewnicki had an advantage in that the candidate of Confederation Liberty and Independence was disqualified, the split within his party, together with the fact that the party lost its subsidies, greatly limited his chances.

=== Second round ===
Shortly after the results of the first round were announced, Piątkowska challenged Gibała to a set of debates. Gibała's campaign team announced that it was unable to reach a sufficient agreement on debates with Piątkowska due to lack of time, but both parties reached a compromise by agreeing to a single TV debate. However, ultimately the two candidates were unable to agree on the format of the debate and none took place.

On 5 October, Radio Kraków offered to host and organize a debate on 12:00 local time on 7 October. Gibała rejected the debate, stating that he would not be available at the time, while Piątkowska ignored the proposal. Another debate was proposed by the TV station wPolsce24 on 8 October at 20:05; it was accepted by Gibała, who appeared in the studio, but rejected by Piątkowska. Piątkowska also challenged Gibała to an informal debate in Kraków's Main Square that were to take place on 9 October at 17:00. Gibała refused, but Piątkowska appeared anyway.

On 9 October, Piątkowska was endorsed by Jacek Majchrowski, a former mayor of Kraków who served 5 terms (2002—2024).

==== Second round candidate endorsements ====
Candidate	First round	Endorsement
Michał Drewnicki	17.50%	Against Piątkowska (Note: Drewnicki stated he “cannot imagine” voting for Piątkowska and agreed with the statement “byle nie Piątkowska” (“anyone but Piątkowska”), while stopping short of a formal endorsement of Gibała.)
Aleksandra Owca	6.91%	No endorsement
Daria Gosek-Popiołek	4.81%	No endorsement
Michał Klimek	4.11%	No endorsement
Sławomir Pietrzyk	0.37%	Undecided
Jan Hoffman		Łukasz Gibała (Note: Hoffman dropped out on 23 September 2026, prior to the first round, and endorsed Gibała. He appeared on the ballot, but the votes for him were invalidated.)

== Debates ==
#	Date	Time (CEST)	Hosted by	Host(s)	Ref
1	2 September 2026	17:00	Super Express	Marek Balawajder	
2	20 September 2026	9:55	Polsat News	Bogdan Rymanowski	
3	20 September 2026	18:30	Wisła Kraków	Jarosław Królewski	
4	22 September 2026	18:45	Radio Kraków; TVP Kraków	Jacek Bańka; Sławomir Mokrzycki	
5	23 September 2026	20:30	TVN24	Katarzyna Kolenda-Zaleska	
6	24 September 2026	20:05	wPolsce24	Małgorzata Gałka; Wojciech Biedroń	
7	8 October 2026	20:05	wPolsce24	Małgorzata Gałka; Wojciech Biedroń	
8	9 October 2026	17:00	Monika Piątkowska	—N/a	

=== Participation ===
The following is a table of participating candidates in each debate:

Participating candidates
Candidate
Candidate	P Present I Invited, not present N Not invited								Total	Attnd.
Candidate	1	2	3	4	5	6	7	8	Total	Attnd.
Bocheńczak (Note: Bocheńczak's candidacy was rejected by the electoral commission on 7 September)	P	N	N	N	N	N	N	N	1	100%
Drewnicki	P	P	P	P	P	P	N	N	6	100%
Gibała	P	P	I	P	P	P	P	I	6	75%
Gosek-Popiołek	P	P	P	P	P	I	N	N	5	83%
Hoffman	N	P	P	P	N	N	N	N	3	100%
Klimek	N	N	P	P	P	P	N	N	4	100%
Owca	P	P	P	P	P	P	N	N	6	100%
Piątkowska	P	P	I	P	P	I	I	P	5	62%
Pietrzyk	N	N	P	P	P	I	N	N	3	75%

== Timeline ==
On 29 July, Prime Minister Donald Tusk announced the election day to be 27 September 2026, 126 days after the recall of Miszalski. The official electoral calendar was published on 31 July:

Timeline of the 2026 Kraków mayoral election

Date	Event description
On the date the ordinance enters into force	Providing public information in the form of a notice by the Małopolskie Voivode, the ordinance of the Prime Minister regarding early elections of the City president of Kraków in the Małopolskie Voivodeship
Until 17 August 2026	Providing public information in the form of a notice about the designated seat of the Municipal Electoral Commission in Kraków
Until 17 August 2026	Notification of the Electoral Commissioner in Kraków I about the establishment of an electoral committee and the intention to nominate candidates for the City president of Kraków
Until 20 August 2026	Submitting to the Electoral Commissioner in Kraków I candidates for members of the Municipal Electoral Commission in Kraków
Until 24 August 2026	Appointment of the Municipal Electoral Commission in Kraków by the Electoral Commissioner in Kraków I
Until 24 August 2026	Establishment of polling districts in medical facilities, social welfare facilities, penal institutions and detention centers, as well as in extramural departments of these establishments, as well as determination of their boundaries, consecutive number, as well as their locations
Until 28 August 2026	Providing public information in the form of a notice on the numbers and boundaries of polling districts, as well as location of district electoral commissions, including premises adapted to the needs of disabled persons, as well as the possibility of postal voting and proxy voting
Until 28 August 2026	Nomination to the Electoral Commissioner in Kraków I of candidates to district electoral commissions
Until 3 September 2026 at 16:00 CEST	Submitting to the Municipal Electoral Commission in Kraków candidates for the City president of Kraków
Until 7 September 2026	Establishment by the Electoral Commissioner in Kraków I of district electoral commissions
From 12 September 2026 until 25 September 2026 at 24:00 CEST	Broadcast without payment of the election programmes, prepared by election committees by means of public radio and television broadcasters

Date	Event description
Until 14 September 2026	Providing public information in the form of a notice, by means of posting the announcement of the Municipal Electoral Commission in Kraków about the registered candidates for the City president of Kraków
Until 14 September 2026	Notice to the Electoral Commissioner in Kraków I of the intention to vote by correspondence by disabled voters, including by means of overlays on ballot papers in Braille alphabet, and by voters who are 60 years of age or older on the day of voting
Until 18 September 2026	Submission of requests to draw up a certificate of proxy voting by disabled voters and by voters who are 60 years of age or older on the day of voting
On 25 September 2026 at 24:00 CEST	The electoral campaign formally concludes; Election silence commences: no political broadcasts, social media posts, or issuing of new physical advertising materials is allowed
On 27 September 2026	The vote takes place between 7:00–21:00 CEST
Until 28 September 2026	Providing public information in the region of the City of Kraków about the resolution of the Municipal Electoral Commission in Kraków regarding the necessity and reasons for repeated voting and the date of repeated voting, as well as surnames and first names of candidates running in the repeated voting
Until 1 October 2026	Notice to the Electoral Commissioner in Kraków I of the intention to vote by correspondence by disabled voters, including by means of overlays on ballot papers in Braille alphabet, and by voters who are 60 years of age or older on the day of voting
Until 2 October 2026	Submission of requests to draw up a certificate of proxy voting by disabled voters and by voters who are 60 years of age or older on the day of voting
On 9 October 2026 at 24:00 CEST	The electoral campaign formally concludes; Election silence commences: no political broadcasts, social media posts, or issuing of new physical advertising materials is allowed
On 11 October 2026	The repeat vote takes place between 7:00–21:00 CEST

== Opinion polls ==
=== First round ===
Graphical summary of opinion polls: Łukasz Gibała Monika Piątkowska Michał Drewnicki Daria Gosek-Popiołek Michał Klimek Aleksandra Owca ~~Jan Hoffman~~ ~~Bartosz Bocheńczak~~

Polling firm/Link	Fieldwork date	Sample size	Gibała Ind. (KdM)	Piątkowska KO	Drewnicki PiS	Gosek-Popiołek Ind. (NL)	Bocheńczak KWiN	Klimek KKP	Owca Razem	Hoffman Ind.	Pietrzyk Ind. (SdPL)	Others	Don't know	Lead
2026 Kraków mayoral election	Election result	255,785	36.38	29.91	17.50	4.81		4.11	6.91		0.37			6.47
Ipsos (2nd late poll) / TVP Info	27 Sep 2026		36.9	29.1	16.8	5.1		4.3	7.4		0.4			7.8
OGB (2nd late poll) / Polsat News	27 Sep 2026		36.1	29.6	17.8	4.6		4.3	7.2		0.4			6.5
Ipsos (late poll) / TVP Info	27 Sep 2026		36.1	28.1	17.8	5.5		4.3	7.8		0.4			8.0
OGB (late poll) / Polsat News, Newsmax Polska	27 Sep 2026		36.1	29.5	17.9	4.4		4.4	7.3		0.4			6.6
IPSOS (exit poll)	27 Sep 2026		36.6	24.4	19.6	6.1		4.2	8.7		0.4			12.2
OGB (exit poll) / Polsat News, Newsmax Polska	27 Sep 2026		35.7	28.4	19.2	4.6		4.7	7.1		0.3			7.3
PersElection	23–25 Sep 2026	800	26.0	23.0	13.4	6.6		4.5	8.4		0.5		17.6	3.0
IBRiS / Polsat News	23–24 Sep 2026	1,000	27.2	23.5	15.4	9.6		4.6	9.0		0.2		10.5	3.8
OGB / LoveKraków.pl	23–24 Sep 2026	750	32.88	27.78	16.11	7.01		5.07	11.01		0.14			5.10
"Weźże Zagłosuj" High School Primary	Sep 2026	3,175	27.51	7.50	9.67	7.37		10.56	20.04	8.08	2.04	8.46 (Note: Invalid votes)		7.47
OGB / Polsat News, Interia	15–17 Sep 2026	750	39.17	23.74	14.74	5.64		4.03	9.75	2.82	0.11			15.43
Opinia24 / Radio Kraków	9–14 Sep 2026	1,000	34.8	20.9	9.3	9.6		3.1	8.2	6.3	0.3		7.5	13.9
IBRiS	7–8 Sep 2026	1,000	17.6	17.1	13.2	11.2		3.5	6.9	7.1	0.7		20.1	0.5
Opinia24 / More in Common Polska	3–20 Aug 2026	800	25.2	15.3	7.6	8.7	3.2	1.0	4.3	3.2		5.3 (Note: Others — 2.1, Banaś (Ind.) — 3.2)	25.2	9.9
SW Research	22–27 Jul 2026		25.1	12.0	8.8	9.8	4.8	3.4	5.8	1.6	1.8	5.4 (Note: Banaś (Ind.) — 2.8, Śliz (PL2050) — 1.4, Komarewicz (UC) — 0.8, Wantuch (Ind.) — 0.3, Świat (BS) — 0.1)	20.6	13.1
Opinia24	17–22 Jun 2026	1,000	22.1	13.7	7.8	8.1	4.5	2.4	5.8	8.3		8.4 (Note: Others — 3.6, Banaś (Ind.) — 3.5 Komarewicz (UC) — 1.3)	18.5	8.4
IBRiS / NL	10–14 Jun 2026	1,000	17.2	12.0	13.2	13.5	5.9	5.0	3.8	2.1		2.8 (Note: Others — 1.4, Banaś (Ind.) – 1.4, Śliz (PL2050) — 0.0)	20.6	3.7
? / NL (Note: Speculative list of candidates put forward by the polling firm)	Early 2026 (Note: "A few weeks before the referendum")		25.4						5.7			50.1 (Note: Wassermann (PiS) — 20.7, Klich (KO) — 12.9, Mazur (Ind.) — 6.0, Berkowicz (KWiN) — 5.9, Śmiałek (NL) — 1.9, Komarewicz (UC) — 1.5, Braun (KKP) — 1.2)	18.7	4.7
? / NL	Early 2026		21.4			17.3			1.3			43.7 (Note: Wassermann (PiS) — 18.3, Bogdan Klich (KO) — 10.9, Berkowicz (KWiN) — 5.9, Mazur — 5.4, Komarewicz (UC) — 1.7, Braun (KKP) — 1.5)	16.2	3.1
OGB	8–16 Apr 2026	1,000	35.63			7.35			2.55	2.14		52.33 (Note: Klich (KO) — 23.70, Wassermann (PiS) — 17.27, Berkowicz (KWiN) — 6.70, Hareńczyk (Ind.) — 3.33, Komarewicz (UC) — 1.33)		11.93
OGB / LoveKraków.pl	17–19 Sep 2025	750	31.97		8.18							59.85 (Note: Miszalski (KO) — 39.92, Berkowicz (KWiN) — 9.78, Sładek (Razem) — 7.12, Komarewicz (UC) — 1.90, Hareńczyk (Ind.) — 1.13)		7.95

An SW Research poll for Wprost conducted across all of Poland in May 2026 found that while 52.4% of Poles had no opinion, 11.4% wanted Andrzej Duda, the former President of Poland, to succeed Miszalski. 8.4% indicated Grzegorz Braun, 4.8%—Bogdan Klich, 4.3%—Marian Banaś, 4.2%—Łukasz Gibała, 2.0%—Bartosz Bocheńczak, 1.8%—Michał Drewnicki and 10.7%—"Others".

=== Second round ===
Polling firm/Link	Fieldwork date	Sample size	Gibała Ind. (KdM)	Piątkowska KO	Others	Don't know	Abstain	Lead
2026 Kraków mayoral election (2nd round)	Election result	259,490	62.12	37.88				24.24
OGB (2nd late poll) / Polsat News, Newsmax Polska	11 October 2026		62.1	37.9				24.2
Ipsos (late poll) / TVN, Polsat, TVP	11 October 2026		62.3	37.7				24.6
OGB (late poll) / Polsat News, Newsmax Polska	11 October 2026		62.6	37.4				25.2
OGB (exit poll) / Polsat News, Newsmax Polska	11 October 2026		64.1	35.9				28.2
Ipsos (exit poll)	11 October 2026		61	39				22
OGB / LoveKraków.pl	7–8 Oct 2026	500	59.96	40.04				19.92
2026 Kraków mayoral election (1st round)	Election result	255,785	36.38	29.91	33.71			6.47
OGB (1st round exit poll) / Polsat News, Newsmax Polska	27 Sep 2026		57.2	38.4		4.4		18.8
OGB / LoveKraków.pl	23–24 Sep 2026	750	60.61	39.39				21.22
OGB / LoveKraków.pl	23–24 Sep 2026	750	51.75	33.64		14.61		18.11
OGB / Polsat News, Interia	15–17 Sep 2026	750	62.51	37.49				25.02
Opinia24 / Radio Kraków	9–14 Sep 2026	1,000	46.7	25.2		14.9	13.2	21.5
Opinia24 / Radio Kraków	9–14 Sep 2026	1,000	46.6		24.2 (Note: Gosek-Popiołek (NL))	16.2	12.9	22.4
Opinia24 / Radio Kraków	9–14 Sep 2026	1,000	47.0		13.1 (Note: Drewnicki (PiS))	23.4	16.5	33.9
OGB	8–16 Apr 2026	1,000	57.60		29.93 (Note: Klich (KO))			27.67
OGB / LoveKraków.pl	18–23 Feb 2025	1,000	71.0		29.0 (Note: Miszalski (KO))			42.0
OGB / LoveKraków.pl	17–19 Sep 2025	750	46.40		45.13	8.47		1.27

An SW Research poll for Wprost conducted across all of Poland in on 29–30 September 2026 found that 28.2% of Poles wanted Łukasz Gibała to win the election, while 21.7% wanted the election to be won by Monika Piątkowska. The remaining 50.1% had no opinion.

== Results ==
In the first round, no candidate won the majority of votes. As such, the second round has been scheduled for 11 October, which will take place between the two candidates that have won the most amount of votes in the first round — independent candidate Łukasz Gibała and Civic Coalition candidate Monika Piątkowska.

Gibała finished first in the first round with 36.4% of the popular vote, while Piątkowska finished second with 29.9%. Gibała's 6.5% lead over Piątkowska, while strong, is below what was expected in exit polls, which gave Gibała up to 12% lead. According to Newsweek, Piątkowska "often acted arrogantly, confirming the worst negative stereotypes about the Kraków's Civic Coalition."

Politicians of the ruling 15 October Coalition described the margin of Michał Drewnicki, the candidate of Law and Justice, as a failure. However, political analysts noted that the results point out to an even larger failure of the ruling coalition, whose candidate captured less than 35% of the popular vote in the first round. Drewnicki stated that his performance was "very good", adding that he expected a much worse result given the split within Law and Justice. He expressed his disappointment towards Mateusz Morawiecki for not endorsing him.

Aleksandra Owca, the candidate of the anti-government left-wing Razem, won 2% more than Daria Gosek-Popiołek, a popular MP of New Left, the only left-of-centre party of the ruling coalition. Gosek-Popiołek's has been described as a "disappointment" by Newsweek, while Owca's result is seen as a success.

Candidate	Party	First round		Second round	
Candidate	Party	Votes	%	Votes	%
Łukasz Gibała	Independent (KdM)	93,042	36.38	161,184	62.12
Monika Piątkowska	Civic Coalition	76,514	29.91	98,306	37.88
Michał Drewnicki	Law and Justice	44,772	17.50		
Aleksandra Owca	Razem	17,684	6.91		
Daria Gosek-Popiołek	Independent (NL)	12,303	4.81		
Michał Klimek	Confederation of the Polish Crown	10,523	4.11		
Sławomir Pietrzyk	Independent (SdPL)	947	0.37		
Total		255,785	100.00	259,490	100.00
Valid votes		255,785	99.43	259,490	99.00
Invalid/blank votes		1,461	0.57	2,617	1.00
Total votes		257,246	100.00	262,107	100.00
Registered voters/turnout		591,230	43.50	591,974	44.27
Source: National Electoral Commission

== Conduct ==
Following the success of the referendum to recall Miszalski, four election election complaints were filed to the Kraków District Court, although only complaint, filed by former deputy president of Kraków Edward Nowak, was considered by the Court. Nowak's complaint alleged that during the referendum, violation of election silence was a deciding factor in the high turnout that caused the referendum to be valid. The Kraków District Court rejected the complaint, stating that Nowak failed to prove that violation of election silence sufficiently influenced the turnout in the referendum.

Bartosz Bocheńczak, the Confederation Liberty and Independence candidate for city president, initially received 2,950 signatures, falling short just 50 signatures of the 3,000 threshold needed to register. After a recount, the electoral commission determined the amount of valid signatures in support of his candidacy fell to 2,745.

Kraków authorities described the conduct of the first round as peaceful, stating that only two incidents took place — there was a report of online election campaigning (in violation of election silence) and an incident in which an elderly man tore up a ballot paper.

=== Second round lawsuits ===
On 30 September, Gibała stated in an interview with RMF FM that he was approached by six Civic Coalition councilors with an offer of cooperation. In response, the KO had all of its Kraków councilors deny this claim and sign statements declaring their loyalty to the party. On 1 October, Piątkowska stated that she sued Gibała for the claim.

Piątkowska's lawsuit started a series of legal skirmishes between the two candidates. On 2 October, the court accepted Piątkowska's complaint and ordered Gibała to retract his statement on alleged approachement by Civic Coalition councilors. On the same day, Gibała sued Piątkowska for her claim that Gibała abstained from voting on most of Kraków City Council votes.

On 5 October, the court found Piątkowska's statement to be untrue and ordered her to retract her words. On 6 October, Gibała also sued Piątkowska for her claim that Gibała's victory will result in mass layoffs in the City Council; the next day on 7 October, the court agreed with Gibała and ordered Piątkowska retract this statement as well. The same day, Piątkowska sued Gibała for his claim that he never had debt, which the court accepted on 8 October and ordered Gibała to retract this claim.

Finally, on 8 October, Gibała sued the Minister of Foreign Affairs Radosław Sikorski for calling him "a liar and mythomaniac" while campaigning for Piątkowska; on 9 October, the court ordered Sikorski to retract this statement. This marked the fifth and final lawsuit of the campaign. Gazeta Wyborcza noted that both candidates fought each in court daily between 1 and 9 October, with Gibała "winning" the lawsuit war 3:2.
