= Michał Klimek =

Polish entrepreneur and politician

- Klimek in October 2026

Personal details
- Born: 3 July 1972 (age 54) Kraków, Poland
- Party: Confederation of the Polish Crown
- Other political affiliations: Real Politics Union (formerly)
- Children: 5
- Education: Tadeusz Kościuszko Kraków University of Technology
- Occupation: Florist; Entrepreneur
- Website: klimek-2026.pl

Michał Klimek (born 3 July 1972 in Kraków) is a Polish entrepreneur and politician. Initially a member of Real Politics Union, Klimek became a member of Confederation of the Polish Crown. Since then, he has been the party's candidate in the 2023 Polish parliamentary election, 2024 Polish local elections, and the 2026 Kraków mayoral election.

== History ==
Klimek attended and graduated from the August Witkowski 5th Secondary School in Kraków. In 1999, he graduated from the Faculty of Architecture of the Tadeusz Kościuszko Kraków University of Technology. He wrote and defended a thesis on development and allocation of the area of Zakrzówek. Afterwards, he became a local entrepreneur in Kraków, where he owns two flower shops.

He became involved in local politics in the 1990s, when he joined the Real Politics Union. After becoming known as the party's local activist, he became a board member of the party's Kraków branch. In 2022, he became a member of Confederation of the Polish Crown. In the 2023 Polish parliamentary election, he ran for the Sejm in constituency no. 13 (Kraków II) on the electoral list of Confederation Liberty and Independence. He won 445 votes and did not gain a seat. In the 2024 Polish local elections, he ran for a seat in the Kraków City Council as a candidate of Confederation and Nonpartisans. He won 1723 votes and did not gain a seat.

In 2026, Klimek became the mayoral candidate of Confederation of the Polish Crown in the 2026 Kraków mayoral election, which took place following the recall of Aleksander Miszalski. His candidacy was announced by the party on 30 May. He was also endorsed by Bezpartyjni Samorządowcy, as well as by the PolExit party. Klimek was also supported by Stanisław Żółtek, the former vice-mayor of Kraków.

During the campaign, Klimek became known for making controversial statements. After the candidacy of Bartosz Bocheńczak, the Confederation Liberty of Independence candidate, was rejected by the electoral commission, Klimek remained the only right-wing candidate besides Michał Drewnicki. During the campaign, Klimek destroyed a Clean Transport Zone sign to express his opposition to it, and also posed with a fire extinguisher in front of the city hall, referring to Grzegorz Braun's infamous Sejm stunt. Despite destroying the sign, Klimek was not charged with a crime.

Ultimately, Klimek won 4.11% of the popular vote, taking sixth place. Klimek complained about the way he was treated during the campaign, arguing that media ignored him, did not invite him to some debates, and did not cover his statements. Nevertheless, he expressed satisfaction with his result, comparing it to his party's leader Grzegorz Braun's performance in the 2025 Polish presidential election. Klimek's performance was assessed favorably by Przegląd, noting that his result was higher than seen in the polls and that Kraków is an unfavourable ground for right-wing parties.

Klimek refused to endorse either of the runoff candidates, stating that he trusts his voters to make the right choice. After the campaign, Newsweek reported that Klimek is considered as his party's candidate for the 2027 parliamentary election. Similar reports, that Klimek is considered the party's top candidate in Kraków for the parliamentary election, were also present prior to the 2026 mayoral election.

== Views ==
During the 2026 Krakow mayoral campaign, Klimek called for "tax cuts to the maximum", mass layoffs at city hall, and creating more favorable conditions for small and medium-sized businesses. He denounced climate policies as "madness". He pledged to "ignite the flame of economic freedom" and reduce state bureaucracy, arguing that city hall and state positions are assigned on the basis of cronyism. He declared his opposition to zero-emission zones, and announced that he would abolish them. Moreover, Klimek called for abolishing bus-only lanes in Kraków by making them available to all drivers, banning flags other than the Polish, Kraków and Lesser Polish ones from local public buildings, fighting multiculturalism, and barring immigrants from social welfare.

Klimek argued that public transport fares are high because the public transport is "gradually being taken over by an Israeli, Jewish co-operative company from Tel Aviv". He also stated that Russia is waging a "just war" in Ukraine. According to Klimek, Ukraine provoked the war with Russia "by moving ever closer to its borders and massacring Ukrainians of Russian origin in the territories closest to Russia"; he also claimed that Ukraine has territorial claims against Poland.

He opposes Polish membership in the European Union, and advocates creating a camp near the border for Ukrainian refugees, declaring them "second-class citizens" and "Ukrainian fifth column", noting the popularity of Bandera amongst Ukrainians living in Poland. He compared the war to the Strange War, claiming: "When there were air raids in 1939, hundreds of people died, but here, after an air raid, we learn that technical infrastructure has been damaged, half a house has collapsed and someone has been injured."

== Personal life ==
Klimek has been married since 1993. He has five children and two grandchildren. He practices judo and Krav Maga. He is a Roman Catholic.

== Election history ==
Electoral history of Michał Klimek
Year	Office	C.	Party	Votes		Result	Ref.
Year	Office	C.	Party	Total	%	Result	Ref.
2023	Sejm	no. 13	Confederation Liberty and Independence	445	0.06	Lost	
2024	Kraków City Council	no. 4	Confederation and Nonpartisans	1,723	4.18	Lost	
2026	Mayor of Kraków		Confederation of the Polish Crown	10,523	4.11	Lost	
