= Common Tomorrow =

Common Tomorrow Wspólne Jutro
- Abbreviation: WJ
- Leader: Daria Gosek-Popiołek
- Founder: Magdalena Biejat
- Founded: 11 January 2025
- Split from: Razem
- Headquarters: ul. S. Żeromskiego 104; 05-250 Radzymin
- Ideology: Social democracy; Progressivism; Feminism
- Political position: Left-wing
- National affiliation: The Left
- Colours: Deep navy blue
- Sejm: 2 / 460
- Senate: 2 / 460
- European Parliament: 0 / 460
- Regional assemblies: 0 / 552

Website
- https://wspolnejutro.pl/

Common Tomorrow Movement (Polish: Ruch Wspólne Jutro) is a progressive political association based in Poland. It was formed on 11 January 2025 by former members of Razem, who split from the party due to their more moderate political stance and closer affiliation with the New Left. The association's goal is to be a platform for people who share similar views to the New Left, but are sceptical to the party's leadership, mainly Włodzimierz Czarzasty.

== History ==
Although it previously refused to join broad centre-left electoral coalitions and ran independently, the left-wing Together Party adopted a different approach in the 2023 Polish parliamentary election, where it ran together with the moderate New Left party and did not criticize its right-wing shift during the campaign. Following the election, Together had intended to enter government as part of The Left coalition together with Donald Tusk's Civic Coalition and Third Way but opted against doing so as the other parties refused to include guarantees the party had sought in the coalition agreement, such as the decriminalisation of abortion and higher expenditure targets for issues such as healthcare and housing. However, it vowed to support Tusk's government in votes of confidence. At the same time, it temporarily abstained from criticizing the Civic Coalition-led government, with party's leader Adrian Zandberg arguing that "We need to let the people who sit behind these doors and work on the government’s program simply work."

However, Together became increasingly disenchanted with the government and clashed with it on a number of issues, including the proposed 2025 budget. This caused internal divisions in Together between the "oppositionists" who advocated leaving the New Left and thus the governing coalition, and "pragmatists" who preferred to stay. Oppositionists argued that the austerity measures of the government's 2025 budget was a betrayal of party's values, while pragmatists believed that staying in the government as a way to exert progressive influence over is the only way to achieve change. As a result, on 11–12 October, a non-binding, consultative referendum was held to decide the course of the party ahead of a party congress on 26–27 October.

In the referendum, 53.75% of Together members voted to leave The Left and thus the government. Against this course being taken by the party at the congress, five Razem parliamentarians, including co-leader Magdalena Biejat, announced they would be leaving the party and remaining in The Left coalition on 24 October. The party then voted to leave the Left coalition, with 0 votes against, on 27 October.

After their departure, Włodzimierz Czarzasty pressured the MPs who left Together to become members of the New Left. However, instead of joining New Left, the MPs decided to form their own movement instead. On 11 January 2025, they founded Common Tomorrow, which they registered as a political association rather than a party in order to prevent further divisions within the Polish left. It was founded by the former Together MP Magdalena Biejat, who co-founded it with other former Together members, including Daria Gosek-Popiołek, Martyna Jałoszyńska, and the former Together spokesman Dorota Olko. Biejat subsequently announced her candidacy in the 2025 Polish presidential election as the official candidate of The Left, with Common Tomorrow acting as a vehicle for her electoral bid.

Daria Gosek-Popiołek was elected the chairman of the association, while Martyna Jałoszynska was appointed vice-chairman. In the 2025 presidential election, Biejat won 4.23% of the popular vote, winning less votes than Together's Zandberg (4.86%). In the 2026 Kraków mayoral election, the leader of Common Tomorrow, Gosek-Popiołek, ran as a candidate with the official endorsement of The Left. However, she ran explicitly as a candidate of Common Tomorrow while distancing herself from The Left. Ultimately, she won 4.81% of the popular vote, being outperformed by Together's candidate Aleksandra Owca, who won 6.91%. After the election's winner, Łukasz Gibała, formally took over his position as the mayor of Kraków, his seat in the Kraków City Council was filled by Zuzanna Piekarz, a member of Common Tomorrow and a runner-up candidate in the 2024 Polish local elections.

== Ideology ==
The association is described as left-wing, and progressive. It advocates green technology, increasing funding of education, health, and public services, and a "diverse society". The association states that it seeks to encompass "people who want to support progressive, good left-wing politics, but who do not necessarily want to be members of a political party". It supports the 15 October Coalition.

== Deputies ==
Four deputies was elected on The Left list during the 2023 parliamentary election.

As members of Sejm:

- Daria Gosek-Popiołek - The association's leader
- Dorota Olko

As members of the Senate:

- Magdalena Biejat
- Anna Górska

== Election results ==
=== Sejm ===
Election year	Leader	# of votes	% of vote	# of overall seats won	Government	Ref
2023	Daria Gosek-Popiołek	1,859,018	8.61	2 / 460	PiS Minority (2023)	
2023	Daria Gosek-Popiołek	1,859,018	8.61	2 / 460	KO–PL2050–PSL–NL (2023-2026)	
2023	Daria Gosek-Popiołek	1,859,018	8.61	2 / 460	KO–PSL–NL–PL2050–C (2026-present)	
2023	As members of Razem, which won 7 seats. Part of The Left coalition, which won 26 seats in total.					

=== Senate ===
Election	Leader	Popular vote	% of votes	Seats	Majority	Ref
2023	Daria Gosek-Popiołek	1,131,639	5.29	2 / 100	KO–TD–L	
2023	As members of Razem, which won 2 seats. Part of The Left coalition, which won 9 seats in total.					
