= Monika Piątkowska =

Polish politician (born 1974)

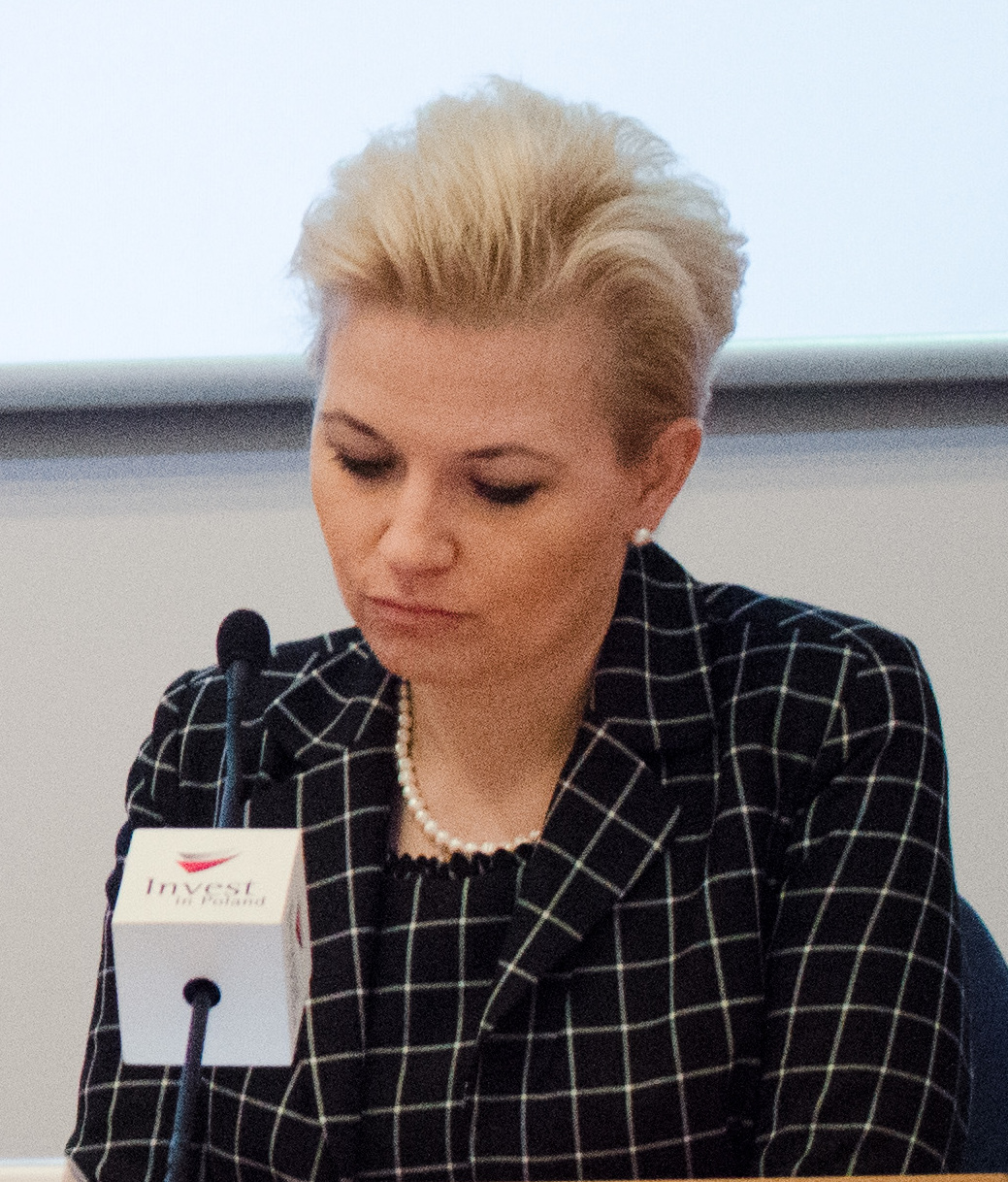
- Piątkowska in 2014

Member of the Senate
- Incumbent
- Assumed office 26 March 2025
- Preceded by: Bogdan Klich

Personal details
- Born: 18 August 1974 (age 51) Zakopane, Poland
- Party: Democratic Left Alliance (2010-2011); Polish People’s Party (2011-2014); Civic Coalition (since 2025)

Monika Piątkowska (born 18 August 1974) is a Polish politician, member of the Senate since 2025.

== Biography ==
Piątkowska was born on 18 August 1974 in Zakopane. She was elected to the Senate of Poland on 16 March 2025, and sworn in on 26 March. In June 2026, she became the joint candidate of the Civic Coalition and Polish People's Party for city president of Kraków in the 2026 Kraków mayoral election.

== Electoral history ==
=== Senat ===
Election year	Party	# of votes	% of vote	District	Elected?
2025	Civic Platform	25,022	50.14%	Senate Constituency no. 33	Yes
