= Magdalena Biejat =

Polish politician (born 1982)

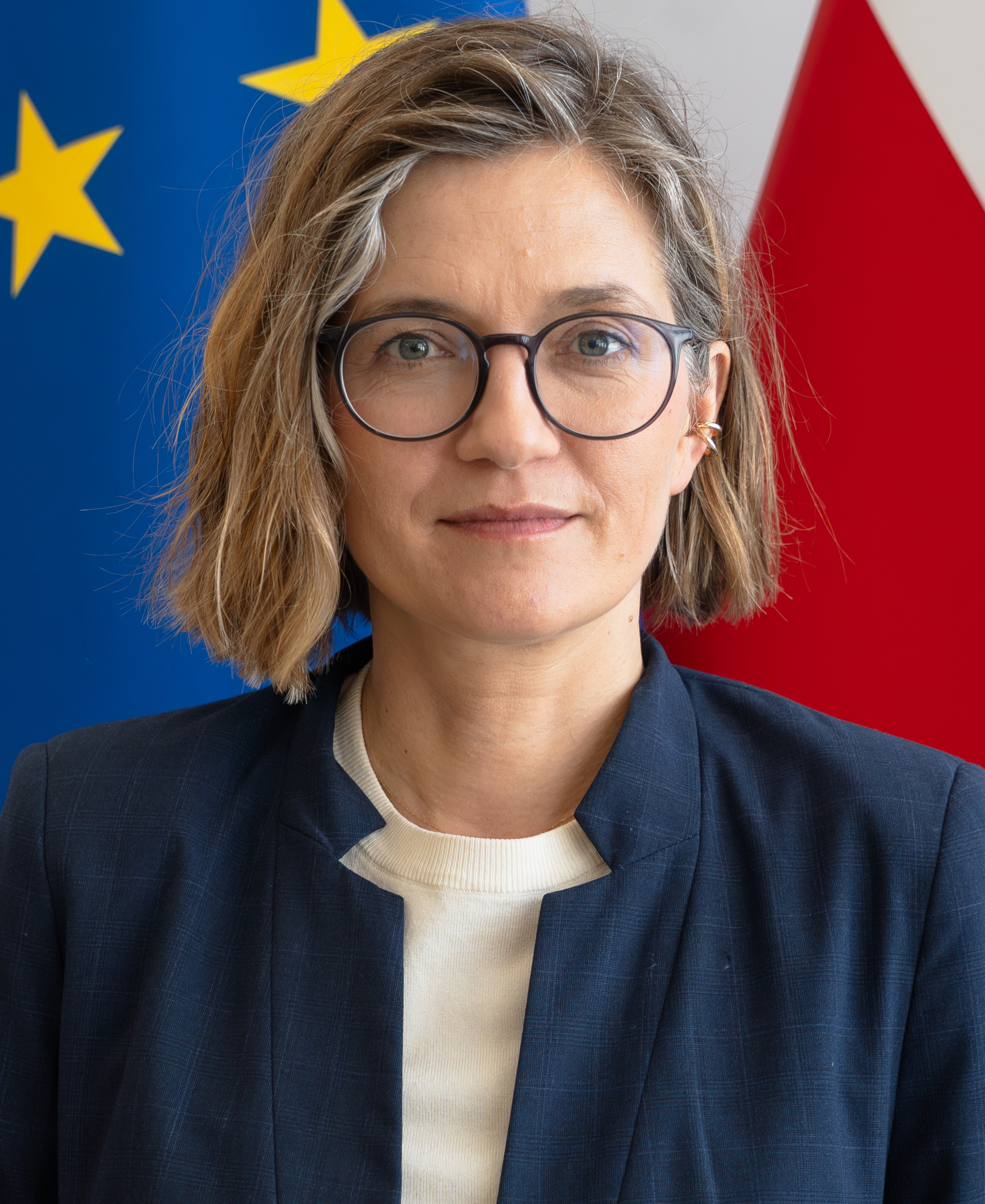
- Biejat in 2026

Deputy Marshal of the Senate
- Incumbent
- Assumed office 13 November 2023 Serving with See list
- Marshal: Małgorzata Kidawa-Błońska

Member of the Senate of Poland
- Incumbent
- Assumed office 13 November 2023
- Constituency: No. 45 (Western Warsaw)

Co-leader of Partia Razem
- In office 27 November 2022 – 24 October 2024 Serving with Adrian Zandberg
- Preceded by: Colective leadership
- Succeeded by: Aleksandra Owca

Member of the Sejm
- In office 12 November 2019 – 12 November 2023
- Constituency: No. 19 (Warsaw I)

Personal details
- Born: Magdalena Agnieszka Biejat; 11 January 1982 (age 44) Warsaw, Poland
- Party: Independent (since 2024); Partia Razem (2015–2023)
- Other political affiliations: The Left (since 2019); Common Tomorrow (since 2025)

Magdalena Agnieszka Biejat (Note: Polish pronunciation: [mag.da.ˈlɛ.na ˈbjɛ.jat]) (born 11 January 1982) is a Polish politician, social activist, and translator of Spanish-language literature. She has served as Deputy Marshal of the Senate and as a senator for the Western Warsaw constituency since 2023. Previously, she was a member of the Sejm from 2019 to 2023.

Biejat is one of the leading figures in the Left political coalition and ran as the coalition's candidate in the 2025 presidential election. She was a co-leader of Partia Razem from 2022 to 2024, leaving the party before it exited the coalition.

== Background and work ==
Magdalena Agnieszka Biejat was born on 11 January 1982 in Warsaw, Poland. She attended the Polish-Spanish bilingual Cervantes High School in Warsaw. In 2006, she graduated with a master's degree in sociology from the University of Granada in Spain. In 2007, she completed a postgraduate course in the management of non-governmental organisations, a joint programme of the Collegium Civitas and the Institute of Political Studies of the Polish Academy of Sciences.

Professionally, Biejat has worked as a translator of Spanish-language literature.

She has been involved in local activism, the study of civil society, and social advocacy, working with non-governmental organisations such as the Helsinki Foundation for Human Rights, or the Stefan Batory Foundation. Between 2012 and 2019, she headed research and counsulting at the Shipyard Foundation, an organisation that analyses and advocates for citizen participation and social innovation.

== Political career ==
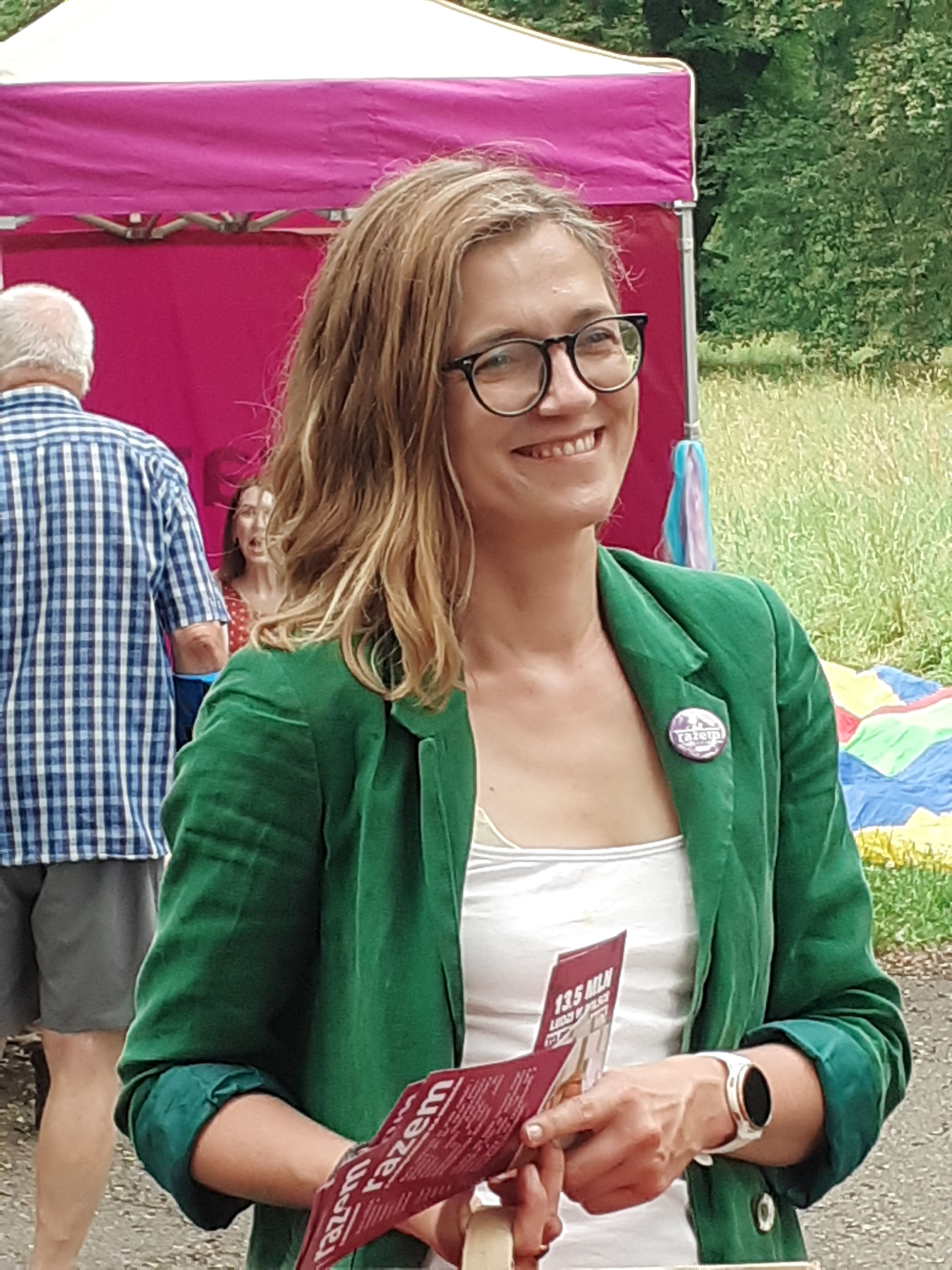
Biejat in 2023

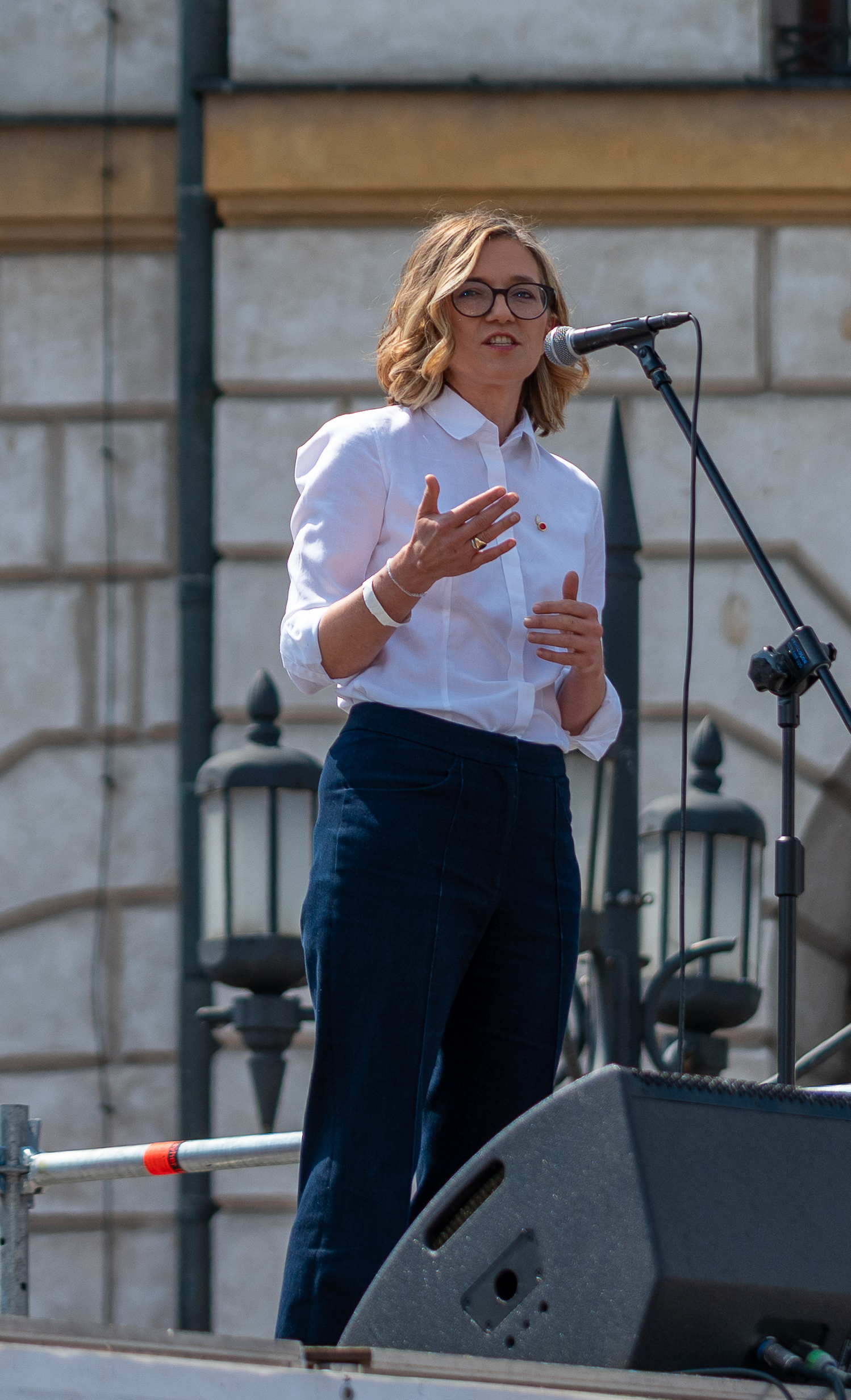
Biejat at the Wielki Marsz Patriotów rally in support of the presidential candidate Rafał Trzaskowski in the second round of the presidential election.

In 2015, she joined Left Together and sat on the council of the Warsaw district.

In 2019, she became deputy chairperson of The Left political alliance.

She has participated in multiple strikes against the tightening of the Polish abortion law and in Polish Pride Parades. On 19 November 2020, during one of the protests, she was attacked with tear gas by a policeman, despite not posing any threat and despite showing her MP ID. The worrying situation raised concerns about the brutality of the Polish police during street protests.

In 2022, she became a co-leader of Left Together alongside Adrian Zandberg. In the 2023 election she successfully ran for one of the Warsaw seats (45th district) in the Senate. Biejat was endorsed by the Senate Pact.

In early 2024 she was announced as The Left's candidate for the mayor of Warsaw in the upcoming local elections. The campaign has also been endorsed by her native Left Together, New Left, The City Is Ours, Labour Union and Polish Socialist Party. Biejat received 12.86% of overall votes placing her third after Trzaskowski (KO) and Bocheński (PiS).

In October 2024, Left Together split from The Left in disagreement of the latter's support for the incumbent Tusk government. In response, Biejat and a number of other MPs departed from Left Together. In January of the following year, she and other former Together MPs founded a non-partisan organization Common Tomorrow (Wspólne Jutro).

== Personal life ==
Biejat lives in the Praga district of Warsaw. She is married and has two children. She declared being vegetarian.

== Electoral history ==
=== Local elections ===
Year	Assembly/Office	Electoral list	Votes received			Result	Ref
Year	Assembly/Office	Electoral list	Total	%	+/−	Result	Ref
2018	District council of Praga-Północ	Voters' Electoral Committiee of Jan Śpiewak – "Warsaw will win"	147	1.49	—	Not elected	
2024	Mayor of Warsaw	The Left	99,442	12.86	—	#3	

=== European Parliament ===
Year	Electoral list	Constituency	Votes received			Result	Ref
Year	Electoral list	Constituency	Total	%	+/−	Result	Ref
2019	Lewica Razem	No. 4 (Warsaw)	616	0.04	—	Not elected	

=== Sejm ===
Year	Electoral list	Constituency	Votes received			Result	Ref
Year	Electoral list	Constituency	Total	%	+/−	Result	Ref
2019	The Left (Note: Officially registered as Democratic Left Alliance party list, which also included other The Left coalition parties.)	No. 19 (Warsaw I)	19,501	1.41	—	Elected	

=== Senate ===
Year	Electoral list	Constituency	Votes received			Result	Ref
Year	Electoral list	Constituency	Total	%	+/−	Result	Ref
2023	The Left (Note: Officially registered as New Left party list, which also included other The Left coalition parties and belonged to the wider Senate Pact 2023.)	No. 45 (Western Warsaw)	204,934	72.4	—	Elected	

=== Presidential ===
Year	Affiliation	First round			Second round			Ref
Year	Affiliation	Total	%	Position	Total	%	Position	Ref
2025	The Left	829,361	4.23	#7	Did not advance			

== See also ==
- Agnieszka Dziemianowicz-Bąk
- Paulina Matysiak
- Dorota Olko
- Adrian Zandberg
- Left Together
