= Rafał Komarewicz =

Polish politician (born 1971)

Rafał Paweł Komarewicz
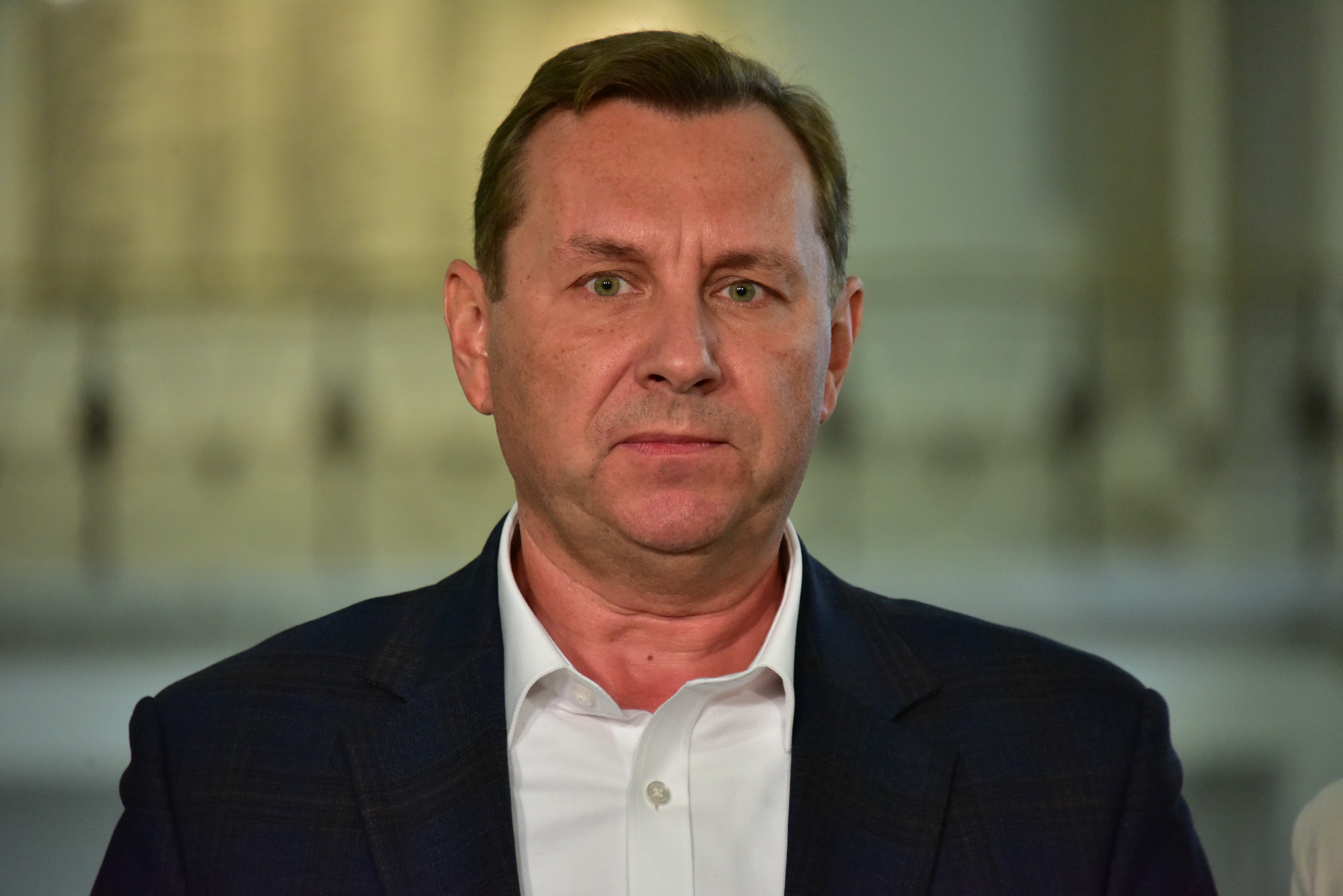
- Rafał Komarewicz in 2024

Member of the Sejm
- Incumbent
- Assumed office 13 November 2023
- Constituency: Kraków

Chairman of the Kraków City Council
- In office 10 January 2022 – 13 November 2023
- Preceded by: Dominik Jaśkowiec
- Succeeded by: Jakub Kosiec
- Parliamentary group: Poland 2050

Personal details
- Born: 10 June 1971 (age 55) Ełk
- Party: Poland 2050 (2022-2026); Centre (since 2026)
- Education: Jagiellonian University

Rafał Paweł Komarewicz (born 17 June 1971 in Ełk) is a Polish politician, entrepreneur, local councillor, and a poseł for the 10th term of the Sejm. Elected to the Kraków City Council in 2018 Polish local elections, he was the chairman of the city council between 2022 and 2023.

== Biography ==
A dentist by education, he graduated from the Jagiellonian University in 1996. He started his own business, opening a commercial law company. He became the owner of a chain of pharmacies and a medical consulting company. He held the positions of vice-president of the board of the Andrzej Urbańczyk Foundation, president of the Krakow Health Academy Association and second vice-president of the Common Małopolska Association.

In the 2010 Polish local elections, he ran for the Kraków City Council on behalf of the Jacek Majchrowski Electoral Committee, the incumbent mayor of the city. He took office during the 2012 term, replacing Władysław Kosiniak-Kamysz. He was not elected in the 2014 Polish local elections, but he nevertheless became a councillor for the next term at the beginning of the term after Jacek Majchrowski, who was re-elected as mayor, resigned from his seat. He was then properly elected in the 2018 Polish local elections, running on the list of Jacek Majchrowski's Electoral Committee – Obywatelski Kraków and successfully retaining his seat. He was a member of the presidential club Friendly Kraków (Polish: Przyjazny Kraków and served as vice-chairman of the city council.

In the 2019 Polish parliamentary election, he unsuccessfully ran for a seat in the Senate from his own electoral committee in constituency no. 33 (covering part of Kraków). He received 27,904 votes (12.39%), which was the lowest result among the three candidates. He later joined Poland 2050 of Szymon Hołownia and became the party's chairman for the Małopolska Voivodeship. On 10 January 2022, he replaced Dominik Jaśkowiec as the chairman of the Kraków City Council.

In the 2023 Polish parliamentary election, he was the leader of the Third Way list in the Kraków constituency. He won a seat in the 10th term Sejm, receiving 44.808 votes (5.92% of all votes cast in the constituency). In the 2024 Polish local elections, he unsuccessfully ran for mayor of Kraków.

In February 2026, together with 17 other MPs of Poland 2050, he decided to leave the party and form a new parliamentary club, Centrum.

== Election history ==
Election	Party	Chamber	Constituency	Result	Won?
2010	Jacek Majchrowski Electoral Committee	Kraków City Council	no. 3	326 (0.87%)	No
2014	Jacek Majchrowski Electoral Committee	Kraków City Council	no. 4	588 (1.35%)	No
2018	Obywatelski Kraków	Kraków City Council	no. 3	4560 (8.78%)	Yes
2019	Rafał Komarewicz Electoral Committee	10th term Senate	no. 33	27 904 (12.39%)	No
2023	Third Way	10th term Sejm	no. 4	27 596 (5.17%)	Yes
2024	Third Way	Mayor of the Royal Capital City of Kraków		9126 (3.07%)	No
