= Sławomir Pietrzyk =

Polish politician

Sławomir Jan Pietrzyk

Member of Kraków City Council
- In office 18 December 2002 – 12 November 2006
- Preceded by: Stanisława Urbaniak
- Constituency: no. 6
- In office 2 December 2010 – 7 May 2024
- Constituency: no. 7

Vice-Chairman of Kraków City Council
- In office 21 November 2010 – 10 January 2022
- President: Jacek Majchrowski

Personal details
- Born: 24 November 1950 (age 75) Kielce, Poland
- Party: Social Democracy of Poland (formerly)
- Spouse: Bernanda (m. 1976)
- Children: Marcin (son)
- Education: Jagiellonian University
- Occupation: Lawyer; Teacher; Journalist
- Website: pietrzykdlakrakowa.pl

Sławomir Jan Pietrzyk (born 24 November 1950 in Kielce) is a Polish lawyer, teacher, journalist, and politician. From 2002 to 2006 he was a member of the Kraków City Council, and from 2010 to 2022 he served as the Kraków City Council's Vice-Chairman. In the 2024 Polish local elections, he unsuccessfully ran for another term in the City Council. He was also a candidate in the 2026 Kraków mayoral election.

== History ==
=== Early life ===
Pietrzyk was born in Kielce, where he attended and graduated from the Juliusz Słowacki 6th General Secondary School. He subsequently moved to Kraków, where he graduated from the Faculty of Law at the Jagiellonian University and later completed postgraduate studies in journalism at the Faculty of Philology. He then became an editor for Głos – Tygodnik Nowohucki, working there since 1977.

In the 1990s, he became a manager of a housing cooperative as president of the board, and became involved with the cooperative movement, becoming the vice president of the Supervisory Board of the Regional Audit Association of Housing Cooperatives in Kraków. He also became the vice-chairman of the main board and chairman of the Małopolska branch of the Association of Journalists of the Republic of Poland.

=== Entry into politics ===
In the 2002 Polish local elections, he ran for Kraków City Council from the electoral list of the Democratic Left Alliance, in constituency no. 6. He won 815 votes and did not win a seat. However, Stanisława Urbaniak, who did win a seat and ran from the same list and in the same constituency as Pietrzyk, was nominated the vice mayor of Kraków by mayor Jacek Majchrowski. As a result, Pietrzyk replaced Urbaniak as a member of the council, taking office on 18 December 2002. In 2005, he became a member of the Social Democracy of Poland.

In the 2006 Polish local elections, Pietrzyk ran for another term in the Kraków City Council, from the electoral list of Jacek Majchrowski Voters' Electoral Committee, in constituency no. 7. He won 403 (1.29%) votes and failed to keep his seat. Afterwards, Pietrzyk remained active in his party, the Social Democracy of Poland.

=== Vice-chairman ===
In the 2010 Polish local elections, he ran from the same committee again, winning 1,697 (5.32%) votes and reclaiming his mandate. He became a close associate of the incumbent mayor Jacek Majchrowski, and was nominated the Vice-Chairman of the city council in 2010. As the Vice-Chairman, he suspended his membership in Social Democracy of Poland and became a member of political association Friendly Kraków (Polish: Przyjazny Kraków), which entered a coalition with the Civic Platform. He ran for re-election in the 2014 and 2018 local elections, winning 1,288 (4.58%) and 1,774 (4.53%) votes respectively and maintaining his seat. In 2018, Gazeta Wyborcza described Pietrzyk as the left wing of mayor Majchrowski's movement, sympathetic to the Democratic Left Alliance.

On 6 December 2021, Kraków City Council from the Civic Platform, Alicja Szczepańska, filed a formal complaint about Pietrzyk. She alleged that during a formal meeting with a Lwów delegation, Pietrzyk offered to have a sexual intercourse with her, and later encouraged her to have sexual relations with one of the Lwów deputies. On 10 January 2022, the Disciplinary Committee voted to remove Pietrzyk from the role of Vice-Chairman. Pietrzyk strongly rejected the allegations, arguing that he fell victim to political intrigue. Despite losing his position as Vice-Chairman, he remained a city council member for the rest of his term.

=== Later activity ===
In 2023, he became the chairman of the Krakow Seniors' Council. In the 2024 Polish local elections, he ran for re-election on the lists of the Civic Coalition, shocking the media as he shared the electoral list with Szczepańska. However, he won 1,396 (4.41%) votes and narrowly lost his seat.

On 2 June 2026, he announced his candidacy for the 2026 Kraków mayoral election, and was endorsed by Social Democracy of Poland. He was subsequently also endorsed by Joanna Senyszyn, the founder of New Wave party who became famous for her 2025 Polish presidential election run. He campaigned on issues affecting elderly citizens of Kraków, and made ambitious political promises, such as making the Kraków public transport free. The media ignored his candidacy, and in one public debate, only six seats were prepared, leaving Pietrzyk, the seventh candidate, unable to participate. Ultimately, he won 947 (0.37%) votes, finishing last. He expressed disappointment at his performance. At the same time, he stated his readiness to endorse one of the runoff candidates, although ultimately he remained undecided.

== Views ==
Pietrzyk has described himself as the "calm, distinguished left", and a social democrat. He contrasted himself with the "far" and "haunted" left, and stated that he considers former Kraków mayor Jacek Majchrowski his political mentor. He promised no layoffs in the city hall, arguing that all Kraków city hall employees are competent, and stated that he would reform the infamous zero-emission zone in Kraków by scaling it down and implementing it gradually. He drew attention by proposing to abolishing tickets in public transport and making it free. He declared that he would implement a new tourist fee in Kraków to compensate.

== Personal life ==
He is married to Bernanda Pietrzyk since 1976. They have one child, son Marcin.

== Election history ==
Electoral history of Sławomir Pietrzyk
| Year | Office | C. | Party | Votes | | Result | Ref. |
| Year | Office | C. | Party | Total | % | Result | Ref. |
|---|---|---|---|---|---|---|---|
| 2002 | Kraków City Council | no. 6 | Democratic Left Alliance | 815 | 3.02 | Runner-up (Note: Pietrzyk narrowly fell short of winning a mandate, but he assumed the mandate a month after the election anyway because of a casual vacancy left by Stanisława Urbaniak, who was nominated vice mayor.) | |
| 2006 | Kraków City Council | no. 7 | Jacek Majchrowski Voters'; Electoral Committee | 403 | 1.29 | Lost | |
| 2010 | Kraków City Council | no. 7 | Jacek Majchrowski Voters'; Electoral Committee | 1,697 | 5.32 | Won | |
| 2014 | Kraków City Council | no. 7 | Jacek Majchrowski Voters'; Electoral Committee | 1,288 | 4.58 | Held | |
| 2018 | Kraków City Council | no. 7 | Jacek Majchrowski Voters'; Electoral Committee | 1,774 | 4.53 | Held | |
| 2024 | Kraków City Council | no. 7 | Civic Coalition | 1,396 | 4.41 | Lost | |
| 2026 | Mayor of Kraków | | Social Democracy of Poland | 947 | 0.37 | Lost | |
