= Ryszard Śmiałek =

Polish politician

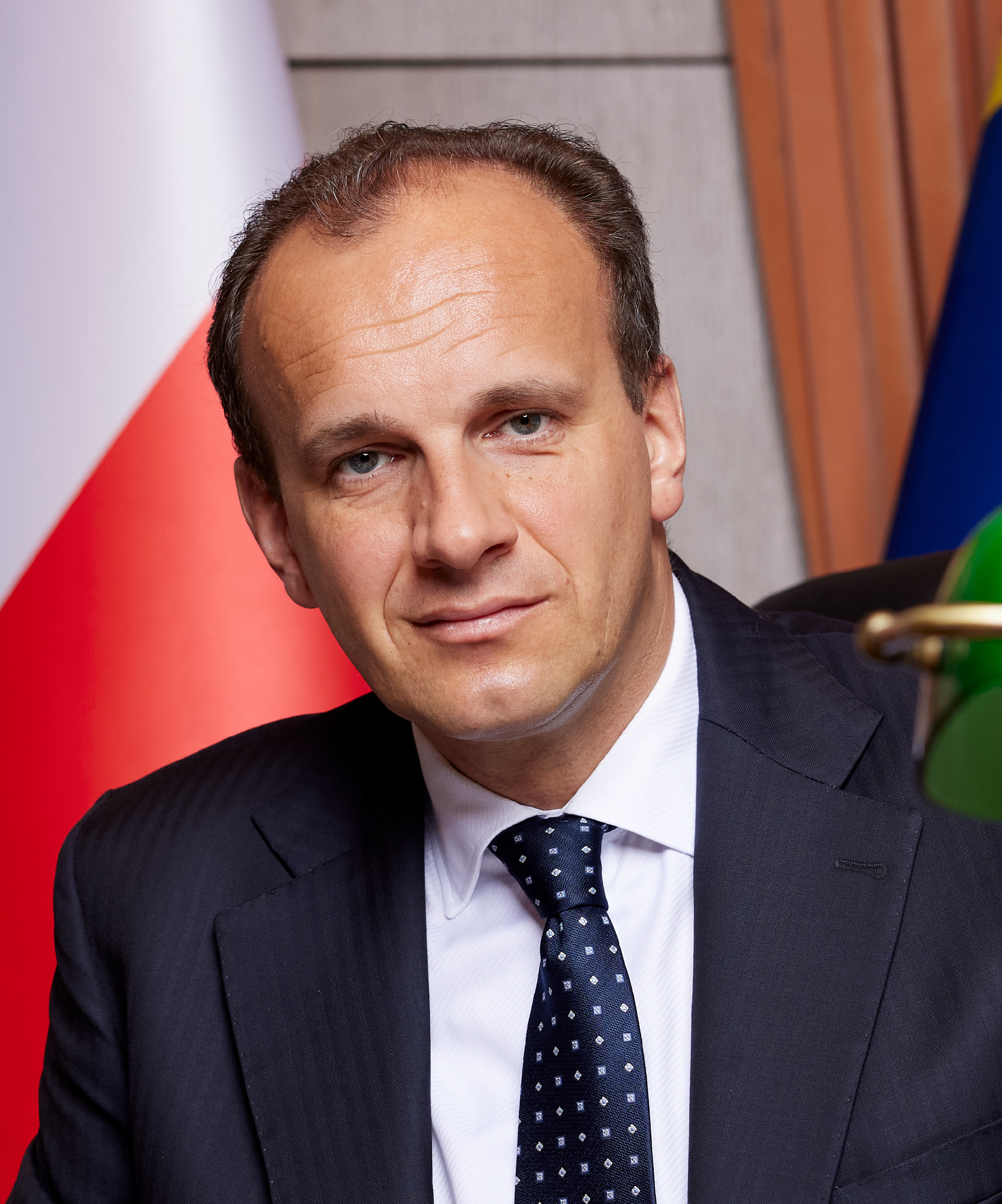
- Śmiałek in 2024

Vicevoivode of Małopolska Voivodeship
- Incumbent
- Assumed office 11 January 2024
- Preceded by: Mateusz Małodziński

Personal details
- Born: Ryszard Kazimierz Śmiałek; 12 June 1978 (age 47) Kraków, Poland
- Party: SdRP; SLD; NL
- Education: Jagiellonian University

Ryszard Kazimierz Śmiałek (born 12 June 1976 in Kraków) is a Polish politician, economic and social activist, who has been the vicevoivode of the Małopolska voivodeship since January 2024.

== Biography ==
Śmiałek studied economy and philosophy, graduating from both fields in the Jagiellonian University, along with undertaking courses in management. He began work on a doctoral thesis on Italian philosophy. He held managerial positions in private and local government companies, and ran his own business. He also became president of the Foundation for Social Democracy and a member of the board of the Kuźnica Association.

From 1996, he was active successively in the Social Democracy of the Republic of Poland, Democratic Left Alliance (of which he was one of the founders), and subsequently in the New Left. He held the positions of head of the Kraków branch of the Democratic Left Alliance and chairman of the party's provincial council, as well as co-chairman of the New Left in Małopolska. He stood unsuccessfully for the Sejm on two occasions. In 2015, he was second on the United Left's list in the Kraków constituency. In 2019, he became the leader of the Chrzanów constituency list of the Democratic Left Alliance (he fell 1,276 votes short of securing a seat at that time). In 2018, he stood for a seat on the Małopolska Regional Assembly; he also stood twice for the Kraków City Council (including in 1998).

On 11 January 2024, he was appointed Second Vicevoivode of the Małopolska Voivodeship. In the local elections that same year, he unsuccessfully stood for a seat on the Lesser Poland Voivodeship Sejmik.

== Election results ==
Election	Electoral committee	Body	Constituency	Result	Elected?
2015	United Left	8th term Sejm	no. 13	2521 (0,46%)	No
2018	SLD Lewica Razem	6th term Lesser Poland Voivodeship Sejmik	no. 3	5273 (1,61%)	No
2019	Democratic Left Alliance	9th term Sejm	no. 12	10 695 (3,38%)	No
2024	The Left	7th term Lesser Poland Voivodeship Sejmik	no. 3	5210 (1,77%)	No
