= Dorota Olko =

Polish politician and sociologist

Dorota Zofia Olko
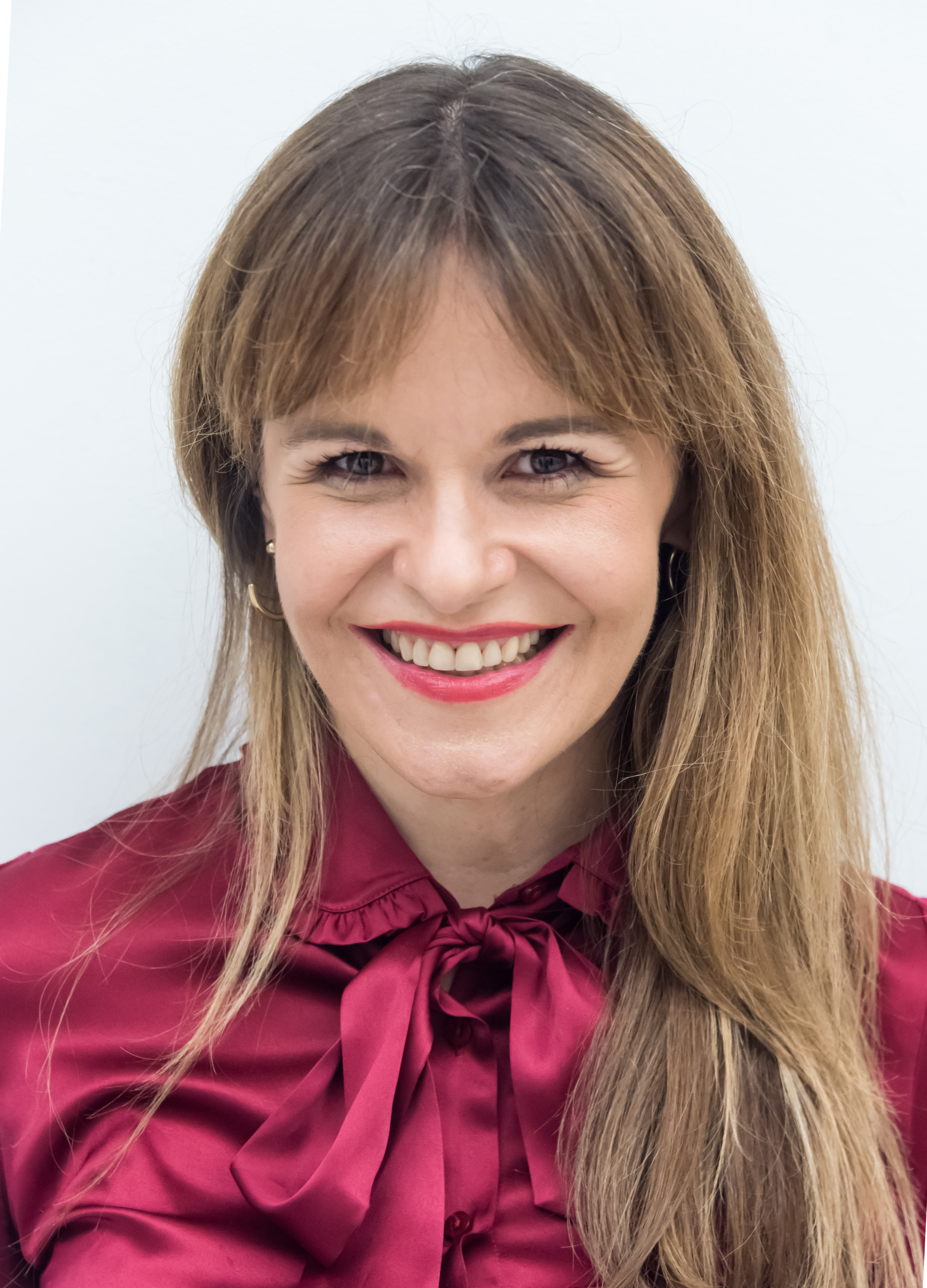

Member of the Sejm
- Serving
- Assumed office 13 November 2023
- Constituency: Warsaw I

Personal details
- Born: 13 January 1988 (age 38) Siedlce, Poland
- Party: Partia Razem (2015-2024)
- Other political affiliations: The Left (since 2019); Common Tomorrow (since 2025)
- Education: University of Warsaw
- Occupation: journalist, sociologist

Dorota Zofia Olko [ˈdɔrɔta ˈɔlkɔ] (born 13 January 1988) is a Polish politician, sociologist, and political activist. She was a member of left-wing Partia Razem and has served as party spokesperson since 2016. Member of Sejm since 2023.

== Biography ==
Olko was born in Siedlce, moved to Warsaw for university and has stayed since. She graduated from the University of Warsaw in 2011 with a master's degree in sociology, then in 2012 with another master's degree in journalism and communication, and a postgraduate degree in Polish philology and text editing. Also in 2011 Olko started her doctoral dissertation in sociology on the perception of body and self-care in the Polish working class, which she completed in 2023; her thesis supervisor was Małgorzata Jacyno.

She worked professionally in Gazeta Wyborcza, Krytyka Polityczna, and taught classes at her alma mater.

== Politics ==
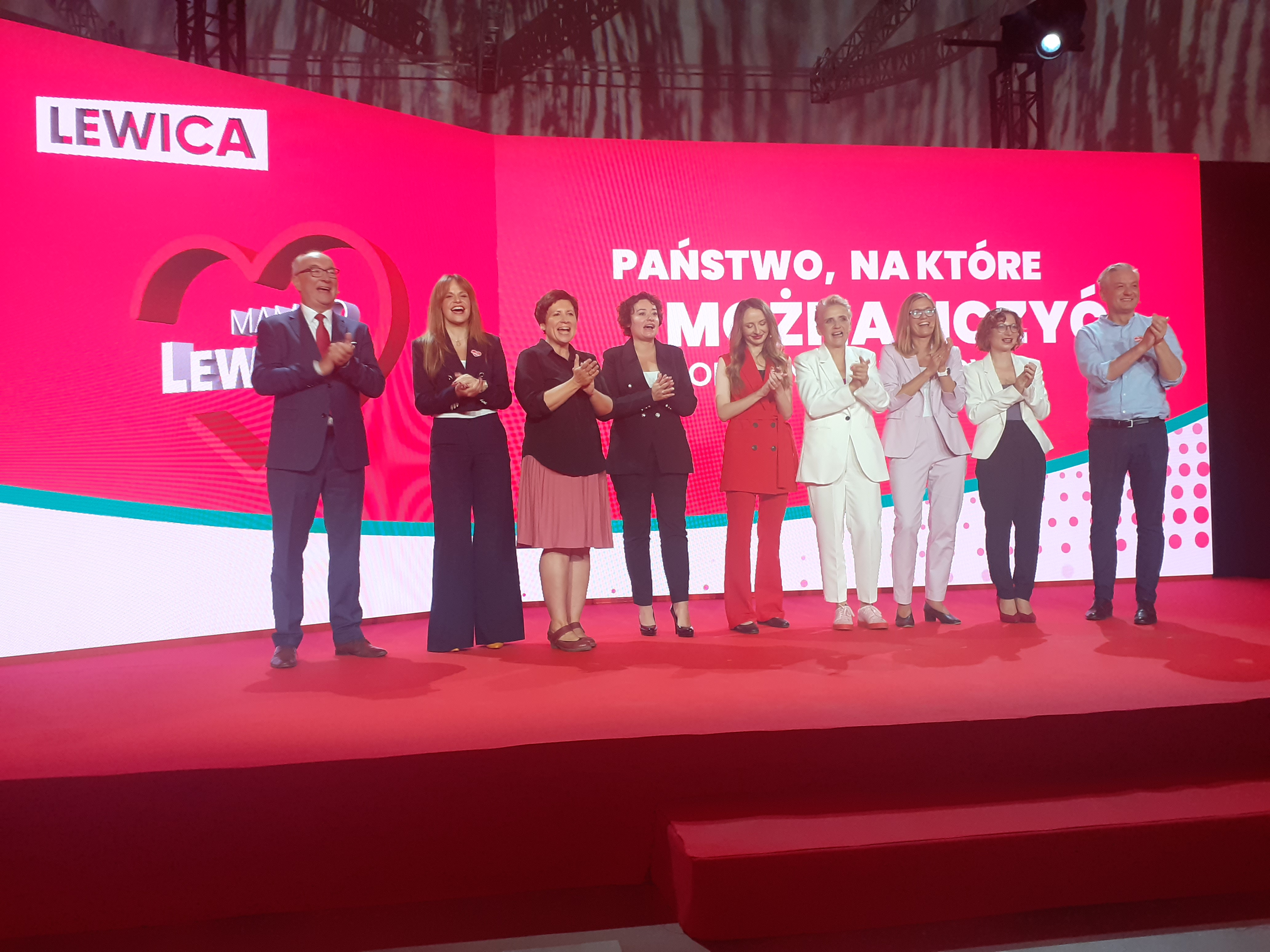
Olko (second from the left) alongside other The Left politicians during a 2023 convention

Dorota Olko was an early member of Left Together since its formation in 2015. Originally she served as the spokesperson for the Warsaw District, but in October 2016 she was promoted to the nationwide role. Olko was also a member of the committee for education and science and currently serves on the National Board.

She did not succeed in any national or local election before 2023, when she effectively replaced Magdalena Biejat on the Warsaw ballot, due to the latter moving over to Senat. Notably, Olko outrivaled Anna Maria Żukowska and Agata Diduszko-Zyglewska vote-wise despite poorer media coverage and less advantageous ballot position.

Her focus are the housing crisis, abortion, access to birth control, and public sector wages.

Election results
Election	Body	Committee	Votes (%)	Constituency	Elected?
2015	Sejm	Together	874 (0.23%)	Siedlce (no. 18)	No
2018	Masovian Sejmik	Together	1,580 (0.42%)	Masovian Voivodeship	No
2019	European Parliament	Left Together (Note: Post-rebranding. Coalition with UP and RSS.)	2,965 (0.35%)	Masovian (no. 5)	No
2019	Sejm	The Left (Note: Formally registered as SLD candidate.)	12,055 (2.66%)	Siedlce (no. 18)	No
2023	Sejm	The Left (Note: Formally registered as NL candidate.)	44,188 (2.58%)	Warsaw I (no. 19)	Yes
