= Aleksandra Owca =

Polish lawyer and local politician

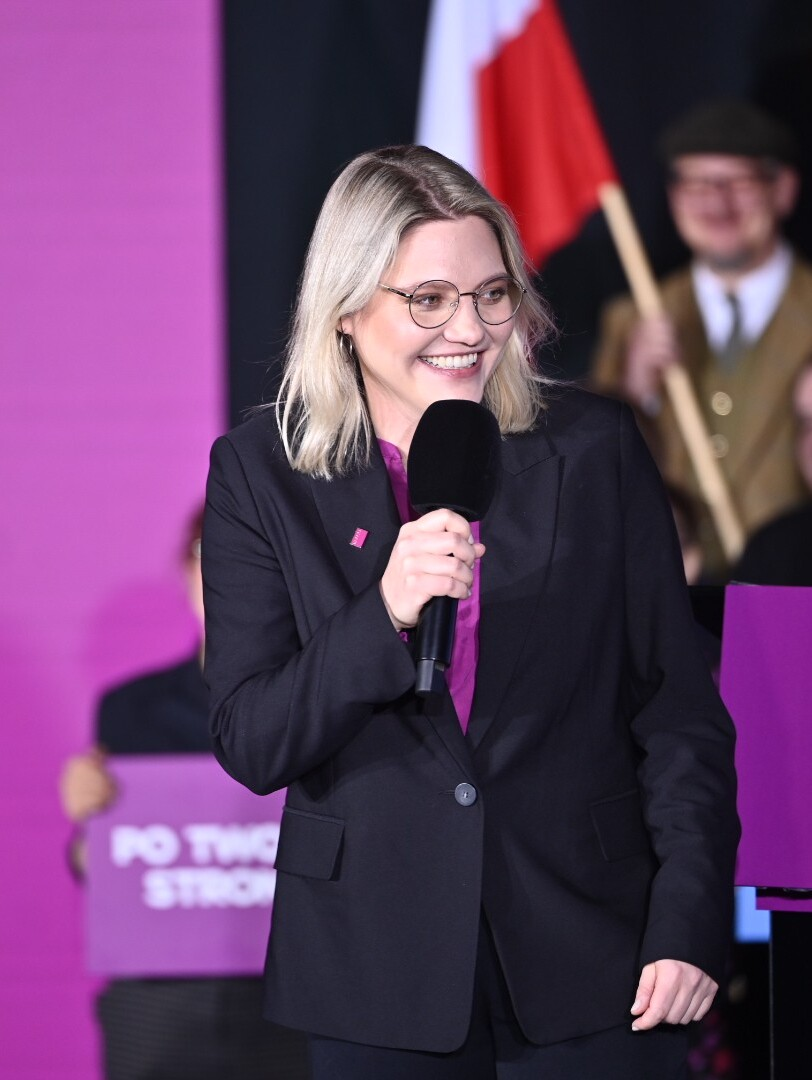
- Owca in 2025

Co-leader of Partia Razem
- Incumbent
- Assumed office 3 December 2024 Serving with Adrian Zandberg

Member of the Kraków City Council
- Incumbent
- Assumed office 7 May 2024
- Constituency: No. 2

Personal details
- Born: Aleksandra Katarzyna Owca; 25 June 1992 (age 34) Kraków, Poland
- Party: Partia Razem (since 2020)
- Education: Jagiellonian University
- Profession: Lawyer (attorney at law)
- Website: aleksandraowca.pl

Aleksandra Katarzyna Owca (born 25 June 1992) is a Polish lawyer and local politician, serving as a member of Kraków City Council since 7 May 2024. She has been a co-leader of Partia Razem since 3 December 2024.

== Biography ==
Aleksandra Owca was born on 25 June 1992 in Kraków, Poland. She graduated from August Witkowski 5th High School in Kraków and earned a law degree from the Jagiellonian University. In 2016, Owca represented the trainees' council during the 12th National Assembly of the Bar Council of Advocates in Kraków. She practices as a legal adviser. In July 2020, she joined the Partia Razem, becoming a close collaborator of Kraków MP Daria Gosek-Popiołek. She also worked for the Frank Bold Foundation.

In the 2023 parliamentary elections, Owca unsuccessfully ran for the Sejm from the 5th position on The Left list in the Kraków constituency. She also organized the election campaign for Daria Gosek-Popiołek. In 2024, Owca topped the list of the Łukasz Gibała's "Kraków for Residents" Election Committee in the second district, and won a seat on the Kraków City Council, where she became deputy chair of the Kraków for Residents club. She served on several committees: Culture and Monument Protection, Property and Housing (as vice-chair), Health and Spa, Social and Senior Policy, Disciplinary, Spatial Planning, and Inventory. She was also a member of the Law and Order Committee but was removed from its membership.

In August 2024, following a court case lost by Maria Anna Potocka, director of the Museum of Contemporary Art in Kraków, concerning allegations of workplace bullying, she requested that the mayor of Kraków, Aleksander Miszalski, conduct an inspection at the institution, which ultimately led to Potocka's dismissal.

At the turn of November and December 2024, she was elected, along with Adrian Zandberg, as a co-leader of the Partia Razem.

== Political views ==
While running for the city council under the banner of fighting against "partisanship," Owca declared that she would not take up employment in municipal companies during her tenure. She is an advocate of a secular state, actively supports LGBT rights, endorses the Green Krakow (Zielony Kraków) initiative proposed by Krakow for Residents (Kraków dla Mieszkańców), works to protect the environment and animal rights. In a speech from January 2024, she attributed the sustained rise in housing prices in Krakow to "populist programs of the ruling party and the greed of banks," criticizing the government's "Housing Start" (Mieszkanie na start) program combined with interest-free loans. In May of the same year, she joined her party colleague Dorota Kolarska in calling for strengthening Poland's so-called pharmaceutical security by investing in domestic drug production through the National Recovery Plan (Krajowy Plan Odbudowy).

== Private life ==
Owca is bisexual.

== Electoral history ==
Election	Electoral committee	Authority	Constituency	Votes, %, Elected?
2023	New Left	10th Sejm	13	5595 (0,74%) No
2024	Kraków for Residents	9th Kraków City Council	2	3630 (8,16%) Yes
2026	Partia Razem	Mayor of Kraków	–	17 684 (6,91%) No
