= Michał Drewnicki =

Polish politician (born 1974)

Member of the Kraków City Council
- Incumbent
- Assumed office 2014
- Constituency: District 7

Personal details
- Born: 13 March 1990 (age 36) Kraków, Poland
- Party: Law and Justice

Michał Drewnicki (born 13 March 1990) is a Polish politician.

== Biography ==
Drewnicki was born in Kraków in the Stefan Żeromski Hospital in Kraków on 13 March 1990. He was raised in Nowa Huta, and already began engaging in local issues in his youth. In 2012, he became a councillor of the Nowa Huta district, and was awarded the title of "best councillor of the district" by Dziennik Polski.

In 2014, he was elected to the Kraków City Council on the list of Law and Justice.

== Private life ==
Michał Drewnicki is married to Małgorzata Drewnicka, and has two daughters, Weronika and Marysia.
