= Daria Gosek-Popiołek =

Polish politician and activist

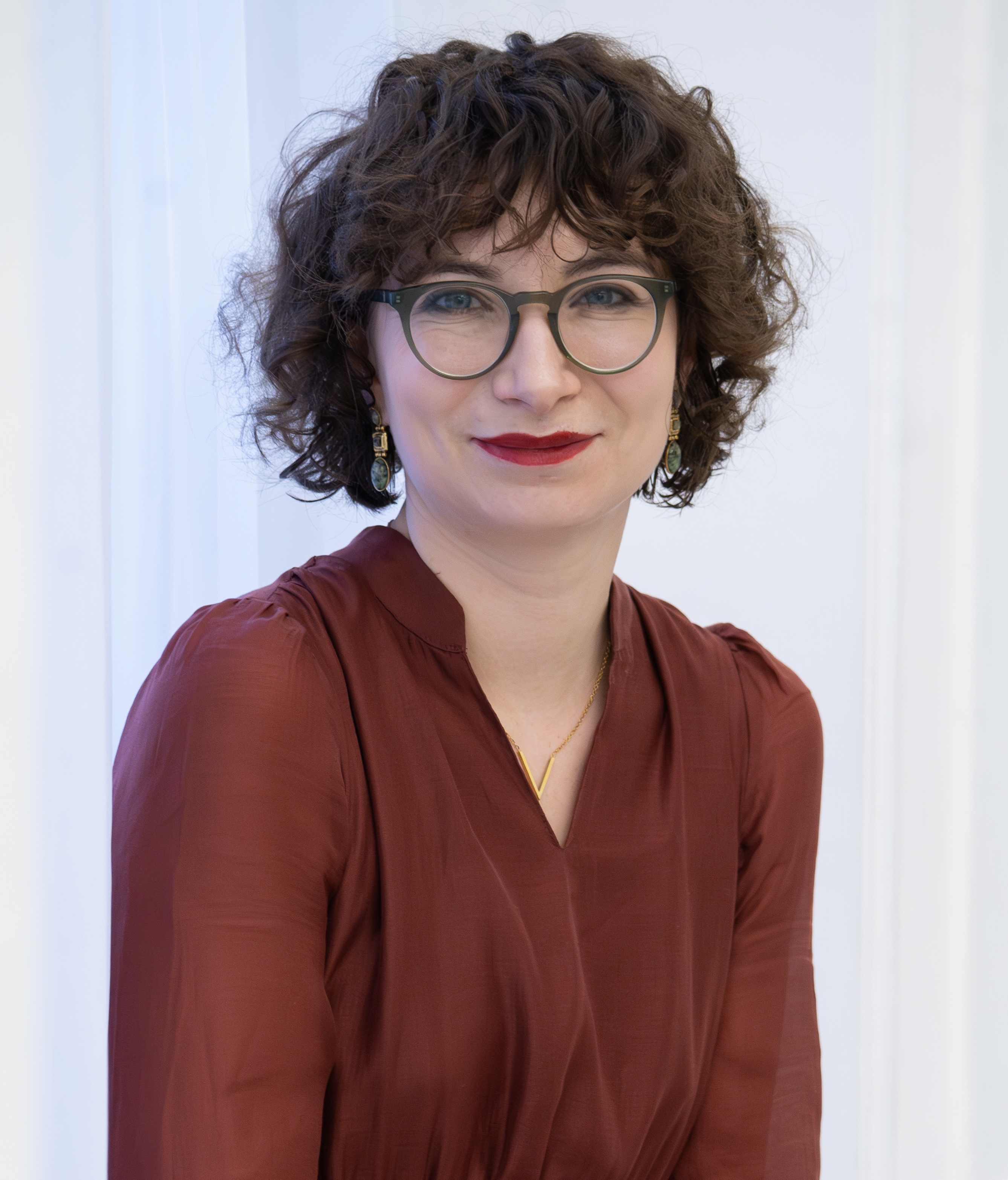
- Gosek-Popiołek in Sejm (2025)

Member of the Sejm
- Serving
- Assumed office 12 November 2019
- Constituency: Kraków II

Personal details
- Born: Daria Iwona Gosek; 1985 (age 40–41) Sosnowiec, Katowice Voivodeship, Poland
- Party: Common Tomorrow (since 2025)
- Other political affiliations: The Left (since 2019); Partia Razem (2015-2024)
- Education: Jagiellonian University
- Occupation: arts manager, journalist

Daria Iwona Gosek-Popiołek (born 1985) is a Polish politician, activist and manager of arts. She is a member of The Left parliamentary group and has served as a member of the Sejm since 2019.

== Biography ==
Gosek-Popiołek was born in Sosnowiec, where she attended a general education liceum before moving to Kraków for university. In 2009 she graduated from the Jagiellonian University with a degree in theatre studies, and also studied philosophy. At the time, Gosek-Popiołek helped run an academic radio station and worked as a radio host and journalist. Her focus was popular science and culture.

For over five years she was the head of Nowa Huta community center. She also wrote about culture for Nowe Perypetie.

In 2014 Gosek-Popiołek strongly advocated against a new zoning plan in Kraków and helped raise social awareness about its issues. She also worked in the Urban Innovation Bureau under mayor Jacek Majchrowski.

Gosek-Popiołek is married and has two daughters. She identifies as Catholic.

== Political career ==
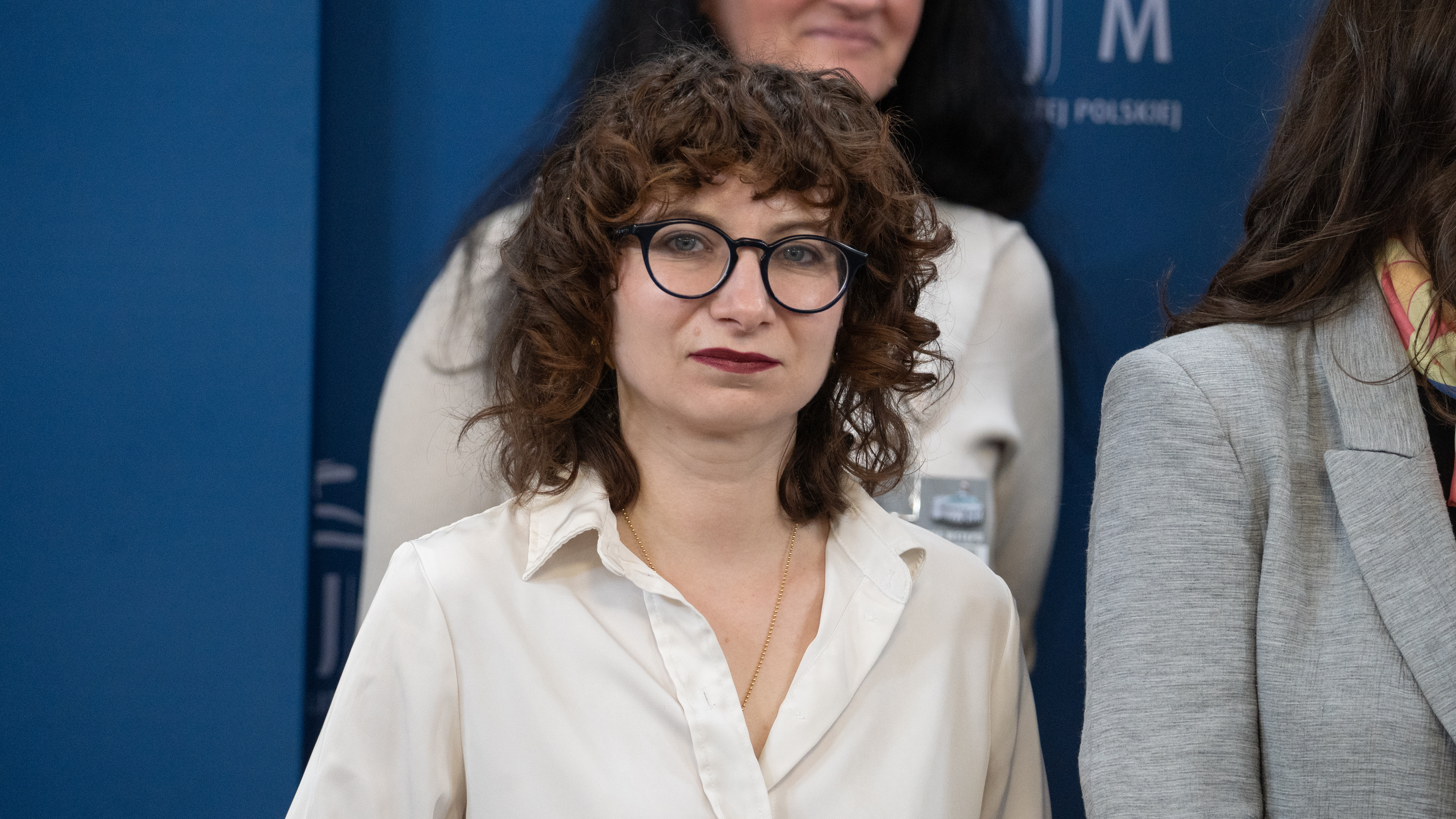
Gosek-Popiołek at a Polish Teachers' Union rally during protests for teachers' pay raises, 2021

Gosek-Popiołek joined Left Together in 2016. She ran a pro-choice campaign against drastic imagery on anti-abortion posters in public and advocated against hospital visiting fees in the Ministry of Health.

In the 2018 local election Gosek-Popiołek ran for the office of Mayor of Kraków and, simultaneously, for a seat in the city council. She did not succeed in either, but in 2019 was elected to Sejm from the Kraków constituency and re-elected in 2023.

In 2024, together with 4 other Left Together MPs, she left the party over disagreements, with the decision to leave The Left coalition. In January of the following year, former members of Left Together who remained with The Left founded a non-partisan organization Common Tomorrow (Wspólne Jutro). Gosek-Popiołek became its chairwoman.

Election results
Election	Body	Committee	Votes (%)	Constituency	Elected?
2018	Mayor of Kraków	Together for Kraków (Razem dla Krakowa)	4,659 (1.38%)	Kraków	No
2018	Kraków City Council	Together for Kraków (Razem dla Krakowa)	1,303 (2.66%)	districts IV and V (no. 2)	No
2019	Sejm	The Left (Note: Formally registered as SLD candidate.)	17,488 (2.69%)	Kraków (no. 13)	Yes
2023	Sejm	The Left (Note: Formally registered as NL candidate.)	39,054 (5.16%)	Kraków (no. 13)	Yes
