= Aleksandra Kot =

Polish politician (born 2000)

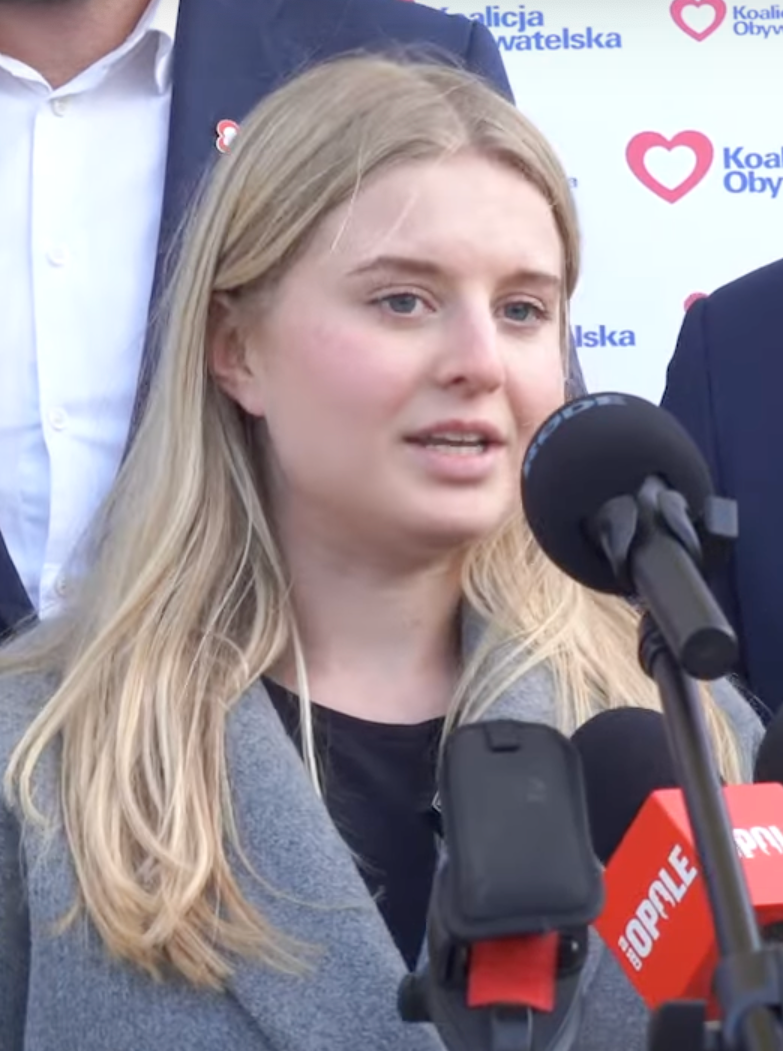
- Kot in 2024

Member of the Sejm
- Incumbent
- Assumed office 28 June 2024
- Preceded by: Jagna Marczułajtis
- Constituency: Kraków II

Personal details
- Born: 17 February 2000 (age 26)
- Party: Civic Coalition (since 2025); Modern (until 2025)

Aleksandra Kot (born 17 February 2000) is a Polish politician serving as a member of the Sejm since 2024. She has served as chairwoman of Modern's youth wing since 2023.
