= Dominik Jaśkowiec =

Polish politician (born 1977)

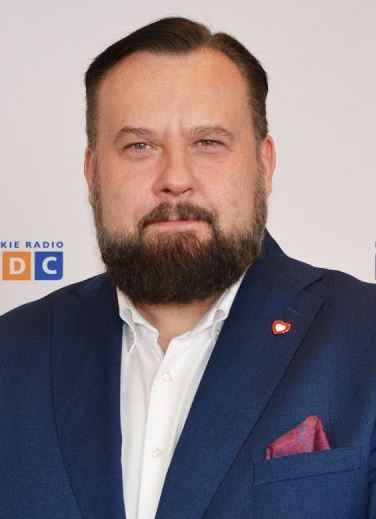

Member of the Sejm
- Incumbent
- Assumed office 8 May 2024
- Preceded by: Aleksander Miszalski
- Constituency: Kraków

Personal details
- Born: 12 June 1977 (age 48)
- Party: Civic Platform

Dominik Jaśkowiec (born 12 June 1977) is a Polish politician serving as a member of the Sejm since 2024. He was a member of the Kraków City Council from 2010 to 2024, and served as chairman of the council from 2018 to 2022.
