= Bogdan Klich =

Polish politician (born 1960)

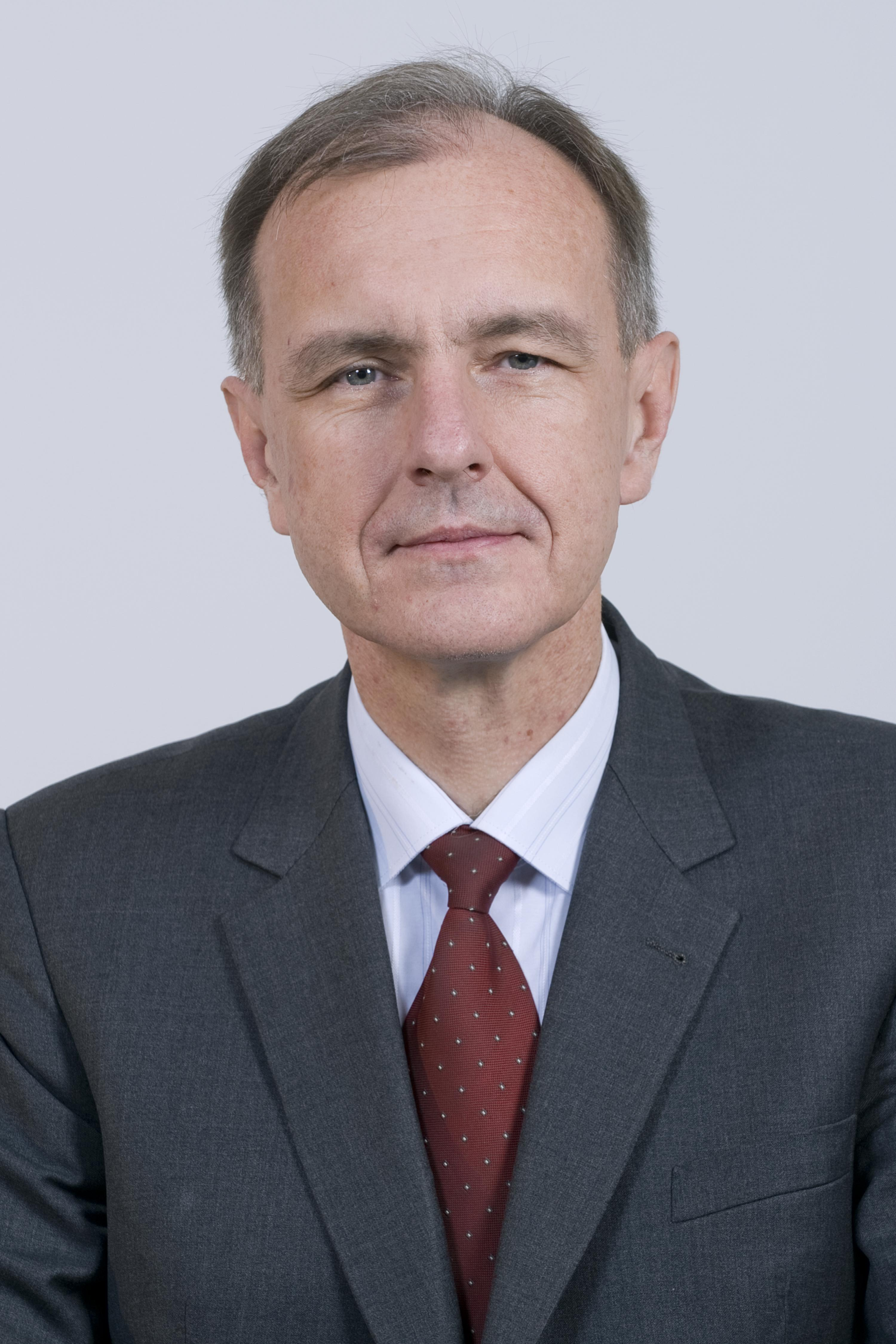

Poland Chargé d'Affaires a.i. to the United States
- Incumbent
- Assumed office 18 November 2024
- Appointed by: Radosław Sikorski
- Preceded by: Marek Magierowski (Ambassador)

Minister of National Defence
- In office 16 November 2007 – 2 August 2011
- Prime Minister: Donald Tusk
- Deputy: Tomasz Siemoniak
- Preceded by: Aleksander Szczygło
- Succeeded by: Tomasz Siemoniak

Personal details
- Born: 6 May 1960 (age 66) Kraków, Poland
- Party: Civic Platform
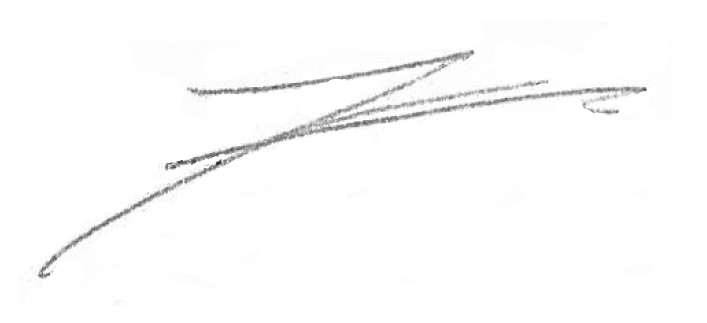
- Signature

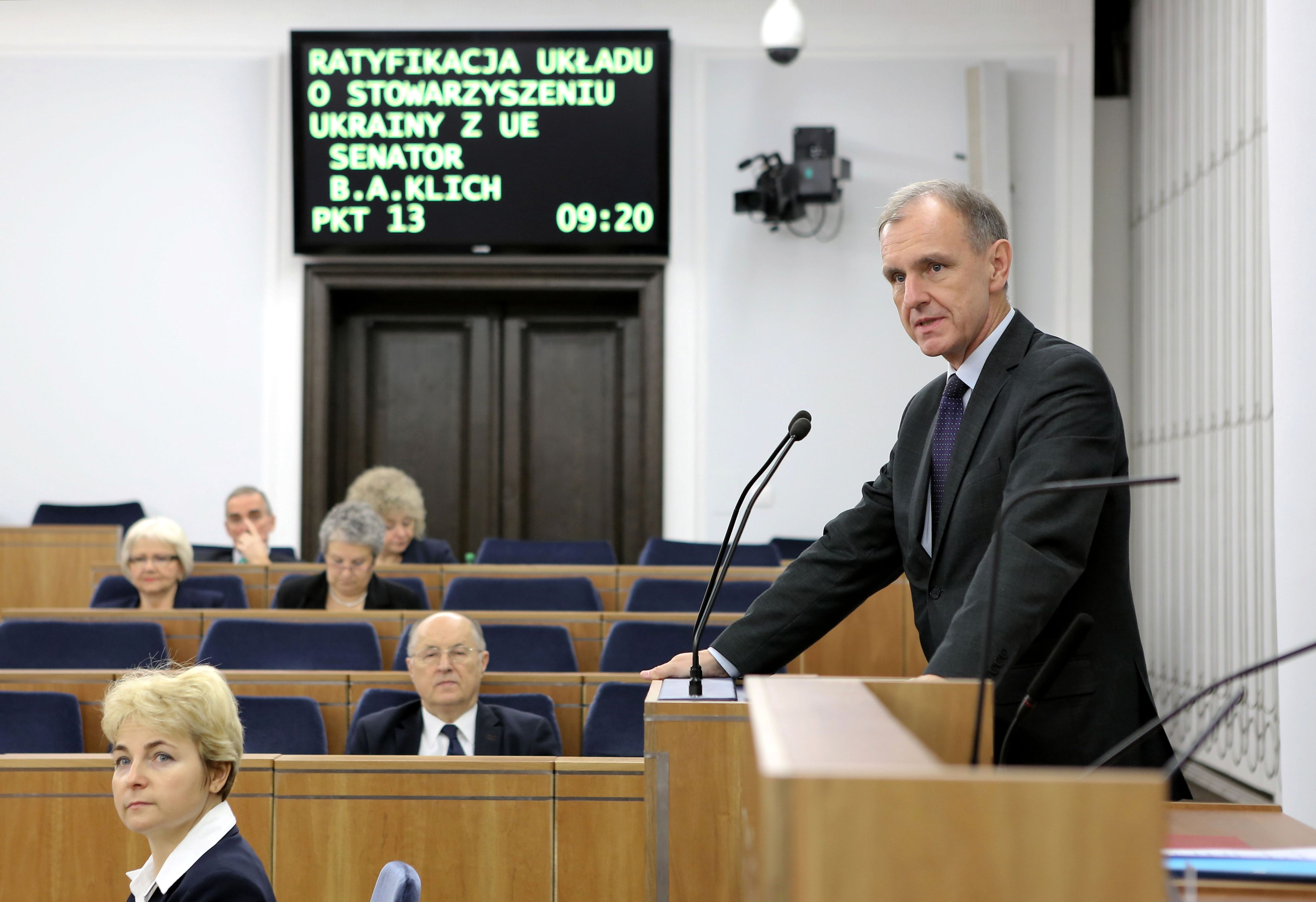
Bogdan Klich during 66th sitting of the Senate (2014)

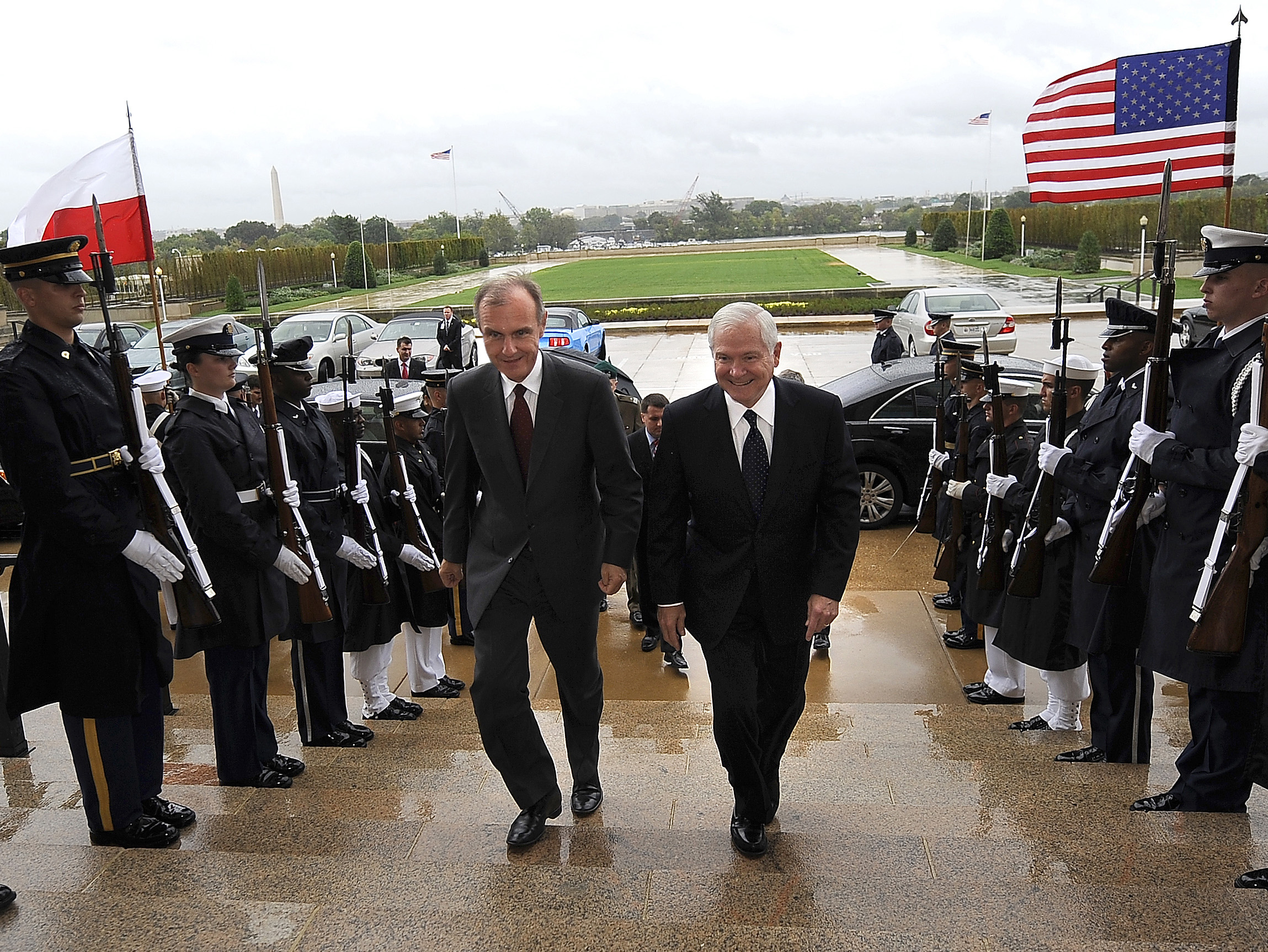
Klich with US Secretary of Defense Robert Gates at the Pentagon (2010)

Bogdan Adam Klich ['bɔɡdan klʲix] (born on 8 May 1960 in Kraków) is a Polish politician, diplomat, and former minister of national defence of Poland. He currently serves as Poland Chargé d’Affaires ad interim to the United States. Until November 16, 2007, he was a member of the European Parliament (MEP) for the Lesser Poland Voivodeship and Swietokrzyskie Voivodeship with the Civic Platform, part of the European People's Party. Klich served as a senator between 2011 and 2024. Since 2002, Klich has been a lecturer at the Department of European Studies at Jagiellonian University. Lecturer at the Cracow University of Economics since the academic year 2013/2014. The author of numerous publications concerning foreign policy and international security.

== Education ==
- 1986: Physician, Kraków Medical Academy
- 1987: Master's in the History of Art, Jagiellonian University (UJ)
- 1991–1995: Doctoral studies, Department of Historical Philosophy

== Political career ==
=== Career in national politics ===
- since 1997: President of the Institute of Strategic Studies
- 2001–2004: Member of Parliament of the Republic of Poland, Vice-Chairman of the Committee on Foreign Affairs, member of the Committee on National Defence
- 1989–1999: Advisor to the Chief Negotiator of the Republic of Poland with the European Union
- 1999–2000: Deputy Minister for National Defence in the Republic of Poland
- 2003–2004: Observer to the EP
- 2001–2004 2012–current: Polish representative and member of the Policy Committee of the Parliamentary Assembly of the Council of Europe
- 2011–2015: Member of the Senate of the Republic of Poland, Vice-Chairman of the Foreign and European Union Affairs Committee, Member of the Committee on National Defence,
- 2015–2019: Member of the Senate of the Republic of Poland, Member of the Foreign and European Affairs Committee, Member of the Committee on National Defence; Minority Leader of Polish Senate
- 2019–2023: Member of the Senate of the Republic of Poland, Chairman of the Foreign and European Affairs Committee, Member of the on Legislative
- 2023–2024: Member of the Senate of the Republic of Poland, Chairman of the European Union Affairs Committee, member of the Committee on Foreign Affairs
- since 2024: Poland Chargé d’Affaires ad interim to the United States.

=== Member of the European Parliament, 2004–2007 ===
A member of the European People's Party group, Kilch served on the Committee on Foreign Affairs. In addition to his committee assignments, he was a member of the Parliament's delegation for relations with Belarus.

=== Minister of Defence, 2007–2011 ===
From 2007 until 2011, Klich served as Minister for National Defence in the Republic of Poland, in the government of Prime Minister Donald Tusk.

During his time in office, Klich implemented Tusk's campaign pledge to withdraw Poland's troops from Iraq. By October 2008, he marked the end of his country's five-year partnership with U.S. forces in Iraq; Poland had been the only country other than the United States and Britain to command a full division of foreign troops in Iraq, and contingents from several other countries initially served under Polish command in a broad area south of Baghdad.

Also under Klich's leadership, Poland and the United States signed a status of forces agreement (SOFA) that paved the way for the stationing of U.S. troops on Polish territory. Three months after the United States announced a reformulated missile-defense plan for Poland in 2010, Klich announced that an undisclosed number of American MIM-104 Patriot surface-to-air missiles would be deployed in the vicinity of Morąg, in northern Poland, just 35 miles from the Russian exclave of Kaliningrad.

On 12 May 2011, Klich announced that Poland would lead a new EU Battlegroup of the Visegrád Group.

In July 2011, Klich resigned after an official investigation into the 2010 Polish Air Force Tu-154 crash which killed President Lech Kaczyński and all 95 others on board, concluded that mistakes by the military pilots were the primary cause of the disaster. Prime Minister Tusk clarified that he did not hold Klich responsible for the crash, saying merely that the investigation had recommended swift and wholesale changes which could only be implemented by a new minister, Klich's deputy, Tomasz Siemoniak.

=== Member of the Senate, 2011–2024 ===
Klich has been a member of the Senate of Poland since the 2011 national elections and is currently the minority leader. He also serves as deputy chairman of the Senate's Committee on Foreign Affairs and as member of the Defence Committee.

In addition to his role in parliament, Klich has again been serving as a member of the Polish delegation to the Parliamentary Assembly of the Council of Europe since 2012. He serves on the Committee on Political Affairs and Democracy and on the Sub-Committee on the Middle East and the Arab World; in this capacity, he is also the Assembly's rapporteur on Morocco.

Since 2015, Klich has been serving as a member of the European Commission's High-level Group of Personalities on Defence Research, chaired by Elżbieta Bieńkowska.

In 2015, he successfully ran for re-election (he received 71,852 votes). In the Senate of the 9th term, he was the chairman of the group of senators of the Civic Platform parliamentary club. In the 2019 elections, he became a senator again, receiving 123,080 votes . After the elections, he became the chairman of the Committee on Foreign Affairs and the European Union .

In the 2023 elections, he also won a senatorial seat, receiving 184,334 votes . In the 11th term, he became the chairman of the European Union Affairs Committee[18]. Appointed to the Parliamentary Assembly of the Council of Europe .

== Other activities ==
- Member of the International Institute of Strategic Studies, London
- Lecturer at the Centre for European Studies at the Jagiellonian University

== Decorations ==
- 2010 – Medal "Milito Pro Christo"
- 2010 – Order of Merit, Ukraine
- 2014 – Order of the Cross of Terra Mariana, Estonia

== Publications ==
- Klich, Bogdan; zu Guttenberg, Karl-Theodor (7 March 2014). "Disrupting Putin's Game Plan". Project Syndicate.
- Klich, Bogdan (19 May 2014). "NATO after Ukraine". Projest Syndicate.
- Klich, Bogdan (8 January 2015). "Standing Up to Putin". Projest Syndicate.
- Klich, Bogdan (28 June 2016). "NATO after Brexit". Projest Syndicate.
- Klich, Bogdan (5 April 2019). "NATO's Stoltenberg Paradox". Project Syndicate.
