= City president =

Municipal title and authority

City president is an official title used by the highest executive authority of a city in several countries, such as Poland.

== Poland ==
In Poland, the title of city president (Polish: prezydent miasta) refers to the highest executive authority in urban gminas or cities with powiat rights, usually with a population over 100,000 inhabitants.
