= Sejm Constituency no. 13 =

Polish parliamentary constituency

Coordinates: 50°03′41″N 19°56′18″E

The Kraków II constituency covers the city of Kraków and three surrounding counties.

Kraków II is a Polish parliamentary constituency in the Lesser Poland Voivodeship. It elects fourteen members of the Sejm.

The district has the number '13' and is named after the city of Kraków. It includes the counties of Kraków, Miechów, and Olkusz and the city county of Kraków.

== List of Deputies ==
=== Deputies for the 10th Sejm ===
Deputy	Party
Andrzej Adamczyk	Law and Justice
Konrad Berkowicz	Confederation
Elżbieta Duda	Law and Justice
Daria Gosek-Popiołek	The Left
Dominik Jaśkowiec	Civic Coalition
Rafał Komarewicz	Poland 2050
Aleksandra Kot	Civic Coalition
Dorota Marek	Civic Coalition
Katarzyna Matusik-Lipiec	Civic Coalition
Jerzy Meysztowicz	Civic Coalition
Jacek Osuch	Law and Justice
Ireneusz Raś	Polish People's Party
Agnieszka Ścigaj	Law and Justice
Małgorzata Wassermann	Law and Justice
