= Kraków City Council =

Local government body in Kraków, Poland

City Council of the Capital Royal City of Kraków Rada Stołecznego Królewskiego Miasta Krakowa

Type
- Type: Unicameral

Leadership
- Chairman: Jakub Kosek, KO
- Vice-Chairpersons: Iwona Chamielec, KO; Michał Drewnicki, PiS; Łukasz Maślona, KdM

Structure
- Seats: 43
- Political groups: Mayoral coalition (5): Kraków for Residents (5) (Note: Despite being elected from the committee's lists, Aleksandra Owca sits as an independent in the city council, while also being a member of Razem.; In 2026, Łukasz Gibała was elected as the mayor of Kraków and had to resign from the council. In his place, New Left candidate Zuzanna Piekarz was sworn in.); Opposition (38): Civic Coalition (20); Law and Justice (12); New Left (5); Razem (1)

Elections
- Voting system: Multi-member electoral districts with five-year terms
- Last election: 7 April 2024
- Next election: 2029

Meeting place
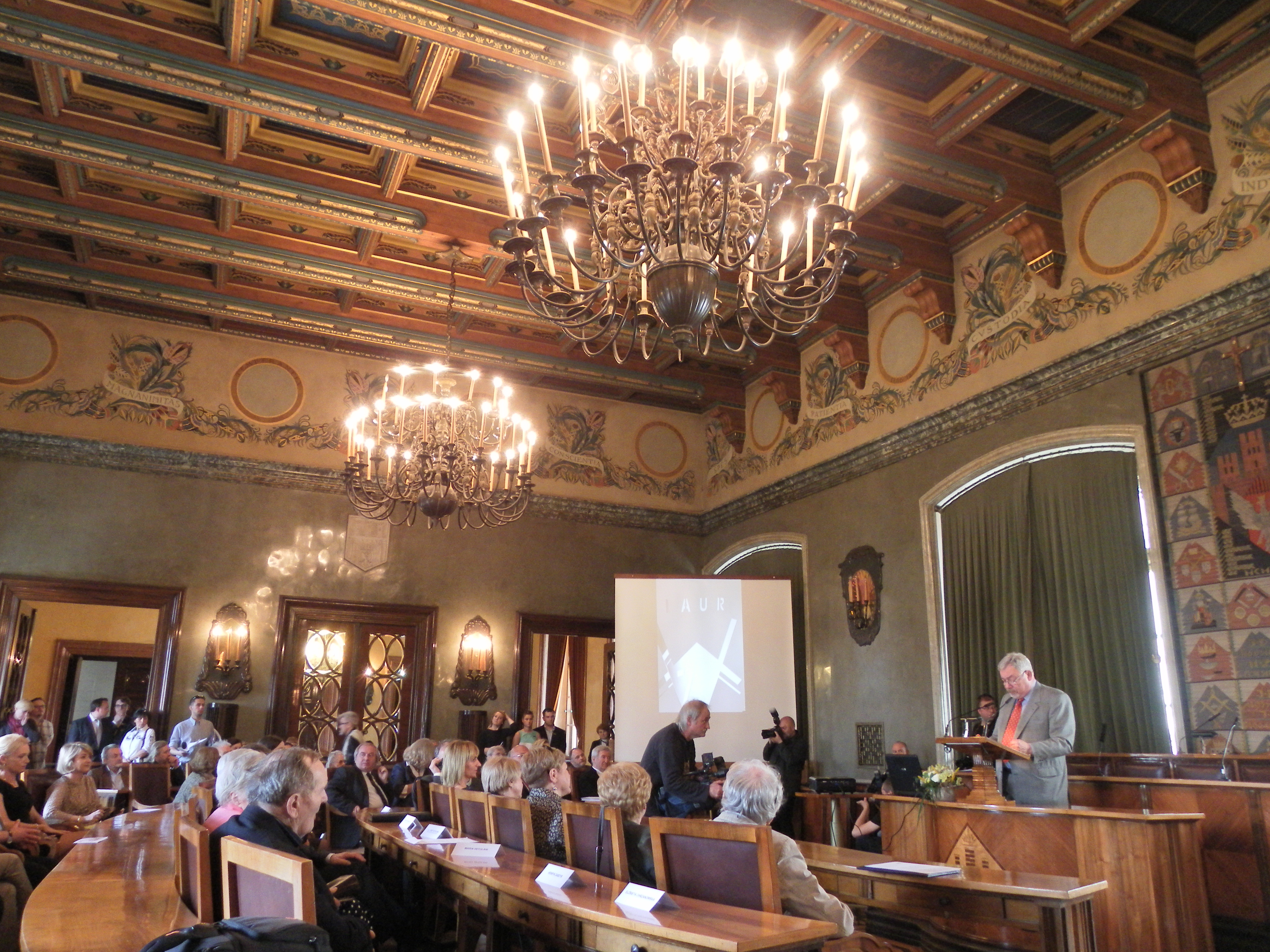
- Wielopolski Palace

Website
- www.rmk.krakow.pl

The Kraków City Council is the governing body of Kraków. The council has 43 elected members elected every five years in an election by city voters through a secret ballot. The election of City Council and the local head of government, which takes place at the same time, is based on legislation introduced on 20 June 2002.

== City Council President ==
Council	Term of office	Name	Party
1st	1990–1993	Kazimierz Barczyk	Solidarity Citizens' Committee
1st	1993–1994	Tadeusz Kołaczyk	Solidarity Citizens' Committee
2nd	1994–2002	Stanisław Handzlik	Freedom Union
3rd	1994–2002	Stanisław Handzlik	Freedom Union
4th	2002–2006	Paweł Pytko	Law and Justice
5th	2006–2007	Paweł Klimowicz	Civic Platform
5th	2007–2009	Małgorzata Radwan-Ballada	Civic Platform
5th	2009–2010	Józef Pilch	Law and Justice
6th	2010–2018	Bogusław Kośmider	Civic Platform
7th	2010–2018	Bogusław Kośmider	Civic Platform
8th	2018–2022	Dominik Jaśkowiec	Civic Platform
8th	2022–2023	Rafał Komarewicz	Poland 2050
9th	2024-current	Jakub Kosek	Civic Platform

== Members of the Kraków City Council ==
Party	District 1	District 2	District 3	District 4	District 5	District 6	District 7
Civic Coalition	Dominik Jaśkowiec; Anna Bałdyga; Piotr Moskała; Grzegorz Stawowy	Jakub Kosek; Grzegorz Stawowy; Aleksandra Kot; Joanna Hańderek	Iwona Chamielec; Tomasz Daros; Renata Piętka; Agnieszka Łętocha	Małgorzata Potocka; Bogusław Kośmider; Agnieszka Pogoda-Tota	Zbigniew Kożuch; Grażyna Fijałkowska; Alicja Szczepańska; Tomasz Leśniak	Łukasz Sęk; Edyta Sikora; Marek Hohenauer	Bogumiła Drabik; Magdalena Mazurkiewicz
Law and Justice	Agnieszka Paderewska	Maciej Michałowski	Michał Ciechowski; Marek Sobieraj	Krzysztof Sułowski; Mariusz Kękuś	Małgorzata Kot; Aleksandra Witek	Michał Drewnicki; Renata Kucharska	Włodzimierz Pietrus; Edward Porębski
Kraków for Residents	Łukasz Maślona	Aleksandra Owca	Łukasz Gibała	Michał Starobrat	Rafał Zawiślak	Rafał Nowak	Eliza Dydyńska-Czesak

== Election results ==
=== 2024 ===
Results of the 2024 election by district.

All 43 seats on the city council were being contested in the 2024 election.

Party	Votes	%	+/–	Seats	+/–
Civic Coalition	118,641	40.11	−3.54	24	+1
Law and Justice	68,615	23.20	−6.62	12	−4
Committee of Łukasz Gibała - Kraków for Residents	46,012	15.56	+2.83	7	+3
Committee of Rafał Komarewicz Kraków Third Way	18,430	6.23	New	0	New
Confederation and Nonpartisan Localists	17,753	6.00	+2.96	0	0
Committee of Andrzej Kulig „Towards the Future”	14,264	4.82	New	0	New
Committee of Stanisław Mazur	7,105	2.40	New	0	New
United for Kraków	3,487	1.18	New	0	New
Self-Governing Kraków	1,467	0.50	New	0	New
Total	295,774	100.00	–	43	0
Source: National Electoral Commission

=== 2018 ===
Results of the 2018 election by district.

All 43 seats on the city council were being contested in the 2018 election.

Party	Votes	%	+/–	Seats	+/–
Committee of Jacek Majchrowski – Civic Kraków	143,883	43.65	−2.39	23	−1
Law and Justice	98,305	29.82	−3.33	16	−3
Committee of Łukasz Gibała "Kraków for Citizens"	41,953	12.73	+8.77	4	+4
Kukiz'15	13,204	4.01	New	0	New
Together for Kraków	10,268	3.11	New	0	New
„Modern Kraków” of Konrad Berkowicz	10,024	3.04	−2.51	0	0
Nonpartisan Local Government Activists	9,576	2.90	New	0	New
Prądnik Biały Our District	1,828	0.55	New	0	New
Our Kraków of Grzegorz Gorczyca	620	0.19	New	0	New
Total	329,661	100.00	–	43	0
Source: National Electoral Commission

=== 2014 ===
All 43 seats on the city council were being contested in the 2014 election.

Party	Votes	%	+/–	Seats	+/–
Law and Justice	75,870	33.15	+6.21	19	+7
Civic Platform	74,703	32.64	−9.75	18	−6
Committee of Jacek Majchrowski	30,660	13.40	−1.26	6	−1
Kraków Against Olympics	15,403	6.73	New	0	New
New Right – Kraków	12,692	5.55	+2.67	0	0
Committee of Łukasz Gibała "Kraków a City for People"	9,073	3.96	New	0	New
Defense of Rights of Retirees Pensioners Tenants	4,573	2.00	New	0	New
Committee of Sławomir Ptaszkiewicz – Kraków at 100%	4,481	1.96	New	0	New
Citizens of Kraków	1,312	0.57	New	0	New
Libertarian Party	97	0.04	New	0	New
Total	228,864	100.00	–	43	0
Source: National Electoral Commission

=== 2010 ===
All 43 seats on the city council were being contested in the 2010 election.

Party	Votes	%	+/–	Seats	+/–
Civic Platform	103,370	42.39	+4.56	24	+2
Law and Justice	65,694	26.94	−1.67	12	−7
Committee of Jacek Majchrowski	35,758	14.66	+3.51	7	+5
Democratic Left Alliance	18,775	7.70	−0.35	0	0
Movement of Voters of Janusz Korwin-Mikke	7,013	2.88	New	0	New
Right Together Self-Government Community	4,770	1.96	New	0	New
Kraków Agreement of Citizens	2,637	1.08	+0.60	0	0
Kraków Initiative Group of Defense of Tenants' Rights	2,603	1.07	New	0	New
Fair Kraków	1,623	0.67	New	0	New
Young Kraków	1,328	0.54	New	0	New
Defense of Human Rights	302	0.12	New	0	New
Total	243,873	100.00	–	43	0
Source: National Electoral Commission

=== 2006 ===
All 43 seats on the city council were being contested in the 2006 election.

Party	Votes	%	+/–	Seats	+/–
Civic Platform	90,331	37.83	+24.10	22	+15
Law and Justice	68,323	28.61	+11.39	19	+10
Committee of Jacek Majchrowski	26,630	11.15	+7.55	2	+2
SLD+SDPL+PD+UP Left and Democrats	19,217	8.05	−8.82	0	−10
League of Polish Families	9,724	4.07	−12.05	0	−9
Lassota	5,445	2.28	−10.13	0	−7
Self-Defence of the Republic of Poland	1,649	0.69	−3.04	0	0
Other committees	17,458	7.31		0	0
Total	238,777	100.00	–	43	0
Source: National Electoral Commission

=== 2002 ===
All seats on the city council were being contested in the 2002 election. The number of seats was lowered from 75 to 43.

Party	Votes	%	+/–	Seats	+/–
Law and Justice	33,638	17.22	New	9	New
Democratic Left Alliance – Labour Union	32,945	16.87	−4.01	10	−7
League of Polish Families	31,485	16.12	New	9	New
Civic Platform	26,807	13.73	New	7	New
"Your City" Civic Committee of Józef Lassota	24,241	12.41	New	7	New
Kraków Self-Government Platform	12,993	6.65	New	1	New
Self-Defence of the Republic of Poland	7,284	3.73	New	0	New
Cross-Party Committee "Friendly Kraków"	7,026	3.60	New	0	New
Other committees	18,873	9.66		0	0
Total	195,292	100.00	–	43	−32
Source: National Electoral Commission

=== 1998 ===
All seats on the city council were being contested in the 1998 election.

Party	Votes	%	+/–	Seats	+/–
Solidarity Electoral Action	86,929	38.59	New	38	New
Coalition of Freedom Union, UPR, RIO...	48,860	21.69	New	18	New
Democratic Left Alliance	47,032	20.88	+6.17	17	−1
Homeland Patriotic Movement	16,802	7.46	New	2	New
Social Alliance: PSL-UP-KPEiR	6,084	2.70	−4.02	0	0
Other committees	19,557	8.68		0	0
Total	225,264	100.00	–	75	0
Source: National Electoral Commission

=== 1994 ===
All seats on the city council were being contested in the 1994 election.

Party	Votes	%	+/–	Seats	+/–
Kraków Coalition „Your City”	40,433	25.19	New	26	New
Democratic Left Alliance	23,946	14.92	New	18	New
Self-Governing Kraków	21,353	13.30	New	13	New
Right Together	15,941	9.93	New	10	New
Nonpartisan Bloc for Support of Reforms	11,377	7.09	New	4	New
Municipal Agreement for Kraków	7,308	4.55	New	1	New
Labour Union	6,193	3.86	New	0	New
Citizens' Agreement „Krakowianie”	5,991	3.73	New	1	New
Polish People's Party	4,592	2.86	+0.22	0	0
Polish Association of Tenants	3,668	2.28	New	1	New
Commonwealth of Societies of District XII	1,613	1.00	New	1	New
Other committees and independents	16,715	10.41		0	0
No choice	1,397	0.87		–	–
Total	160,527	100.00	–	75	0
Source: National Electoral Commission

=== 1990 ===
All seats on the city council were being contested in the 1990 election.

Party	Votes	%	Seats
Kraków Citizens' Committee „Solidarity”	188,963	73.84	73
Confederation of Independent Poland	16,197	6.33	2
Electoral Bloc of the Left	11,260	4.40	0
Polish People's Party	6,750	2.64	0
Other committees and independents	28,561	11.16	0
No choice	4,163	1.63	–
Total	255,894	100.00	75
Source: Official Journal of the Kraków Voivodeship
