= 2024 Polish local elections =

2024 Polish regional assembly elections
- 7 April 2024 (first round); 21 April 2024 (second round)

552 seats to voivodeship sejmiks, 6,170 seats to powiat councils, 39,416 seats to gmina councils, 420 seats to Warsaw district councils, and 2,477 wójts/mayors
- Turnout: 51.94% ▼3.0pp
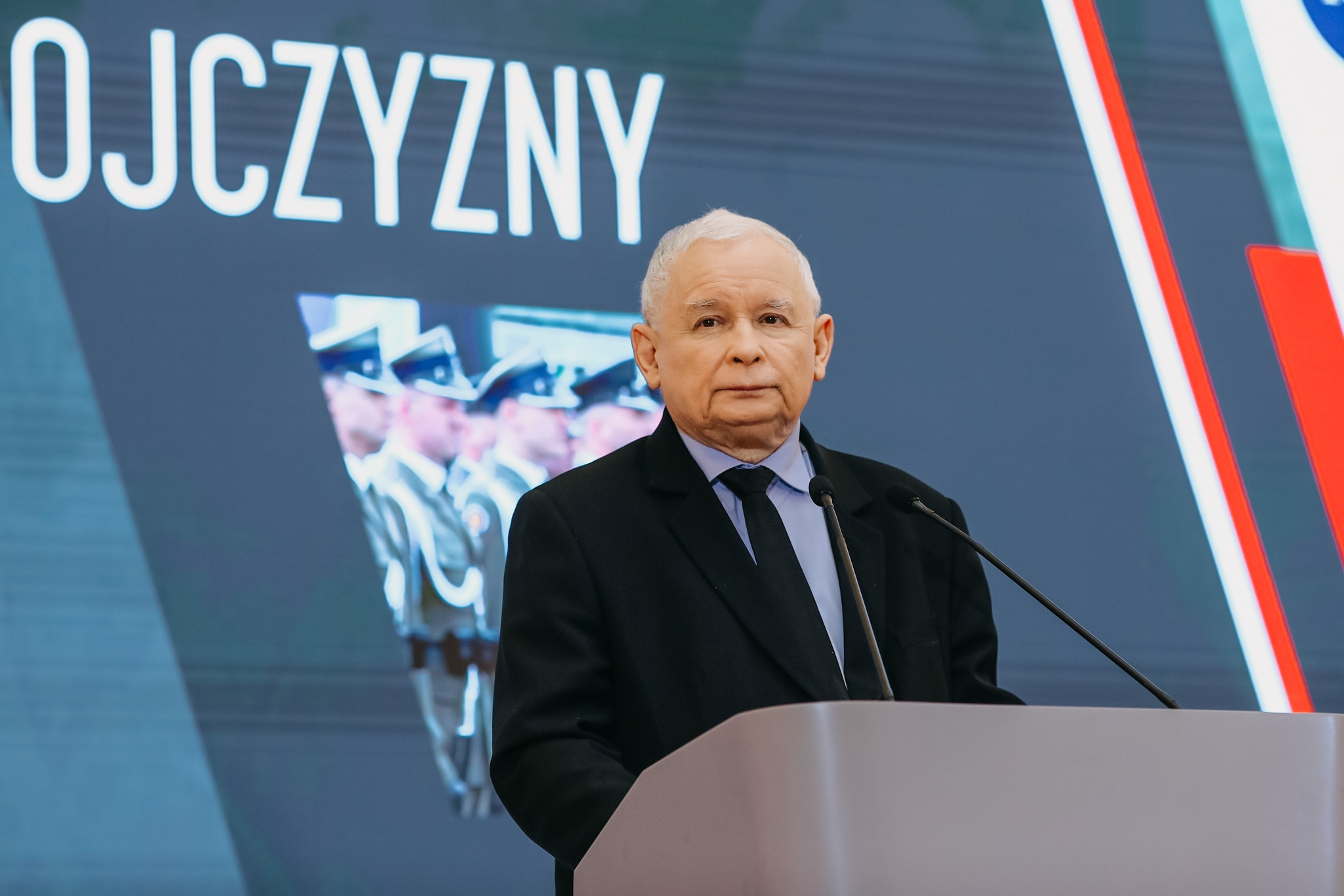

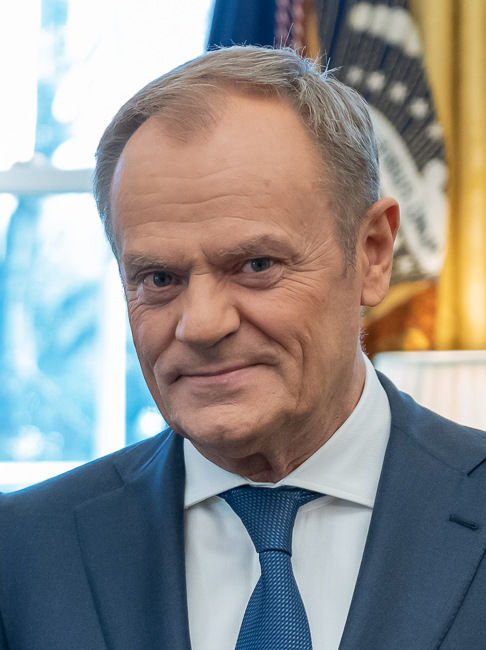

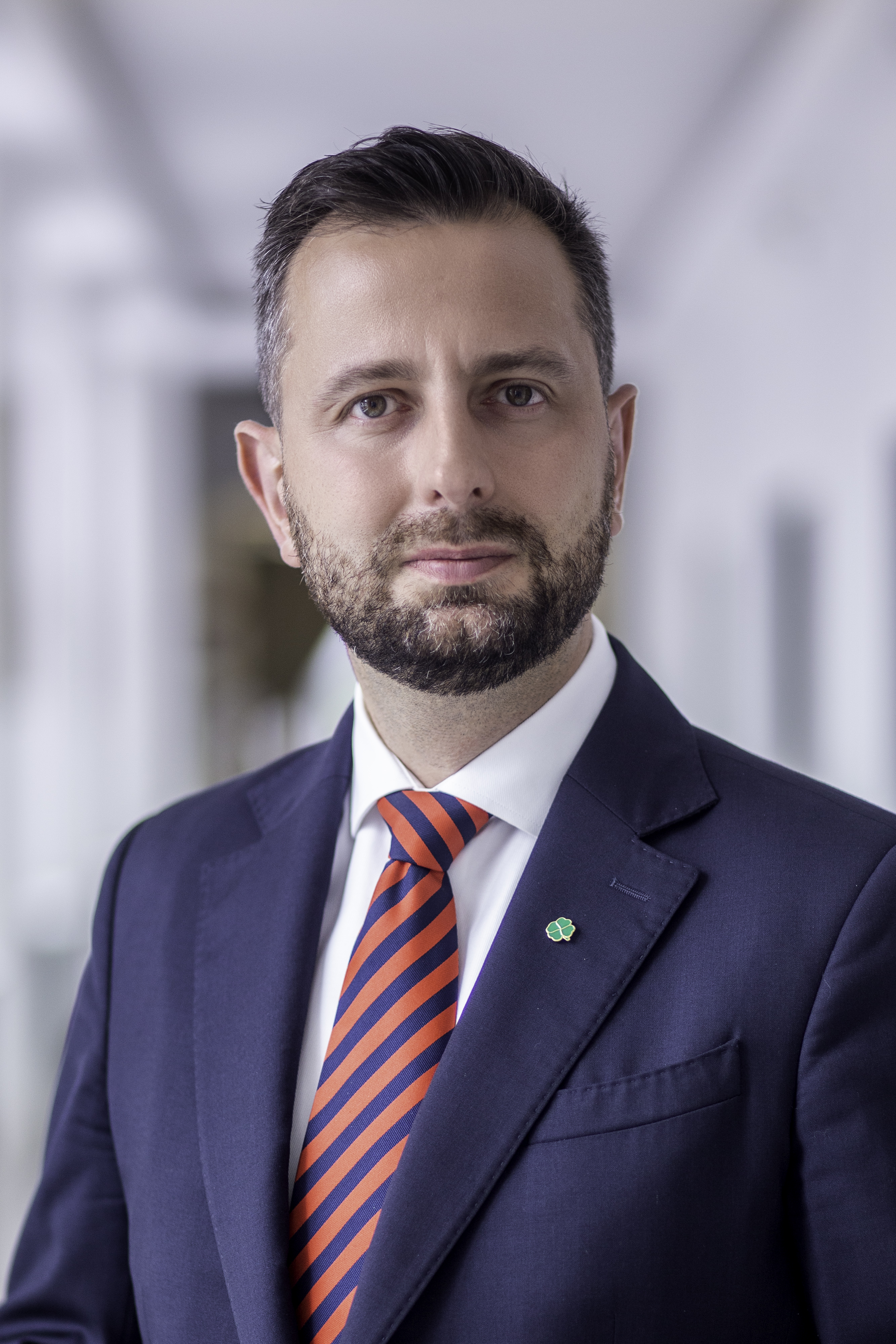

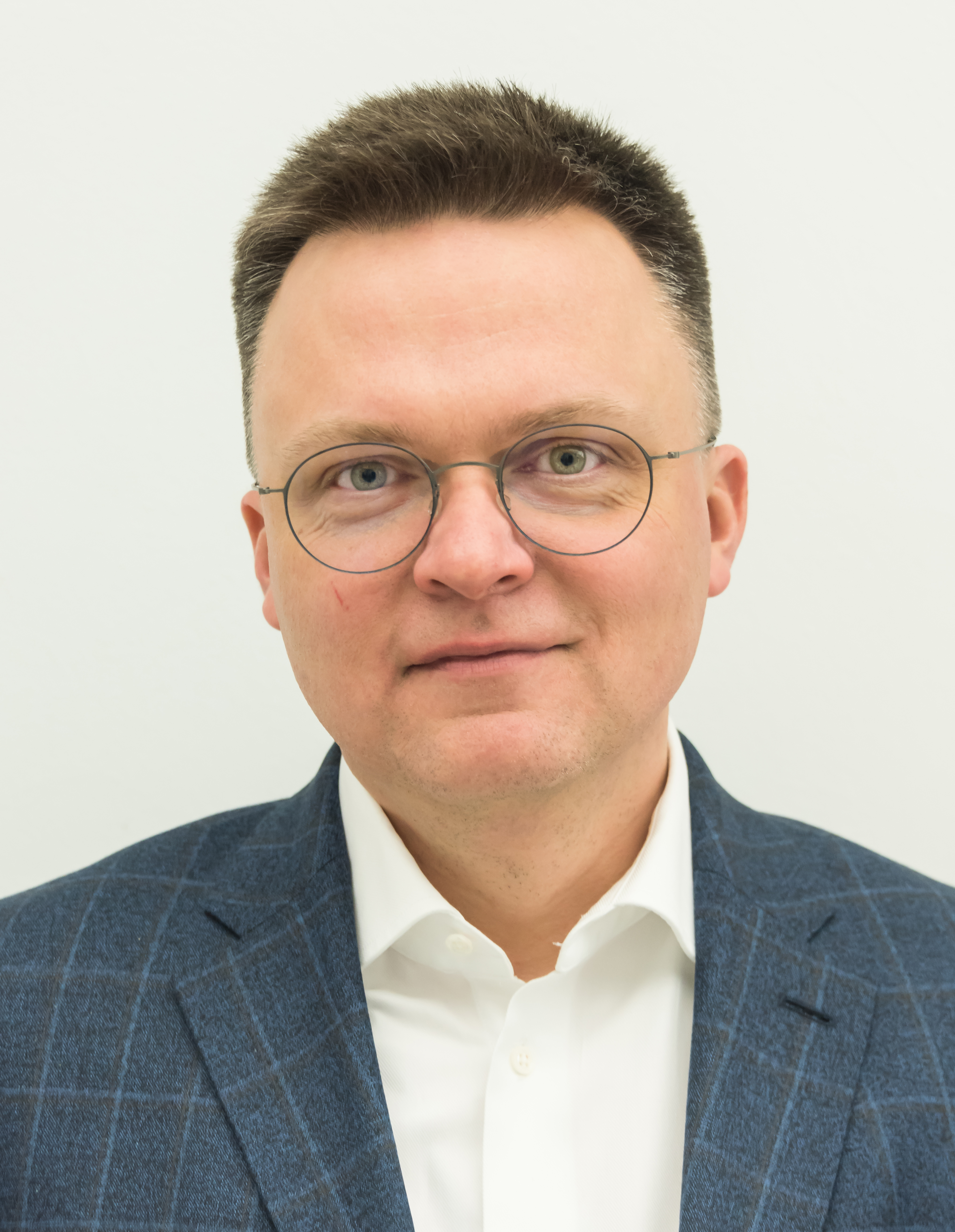

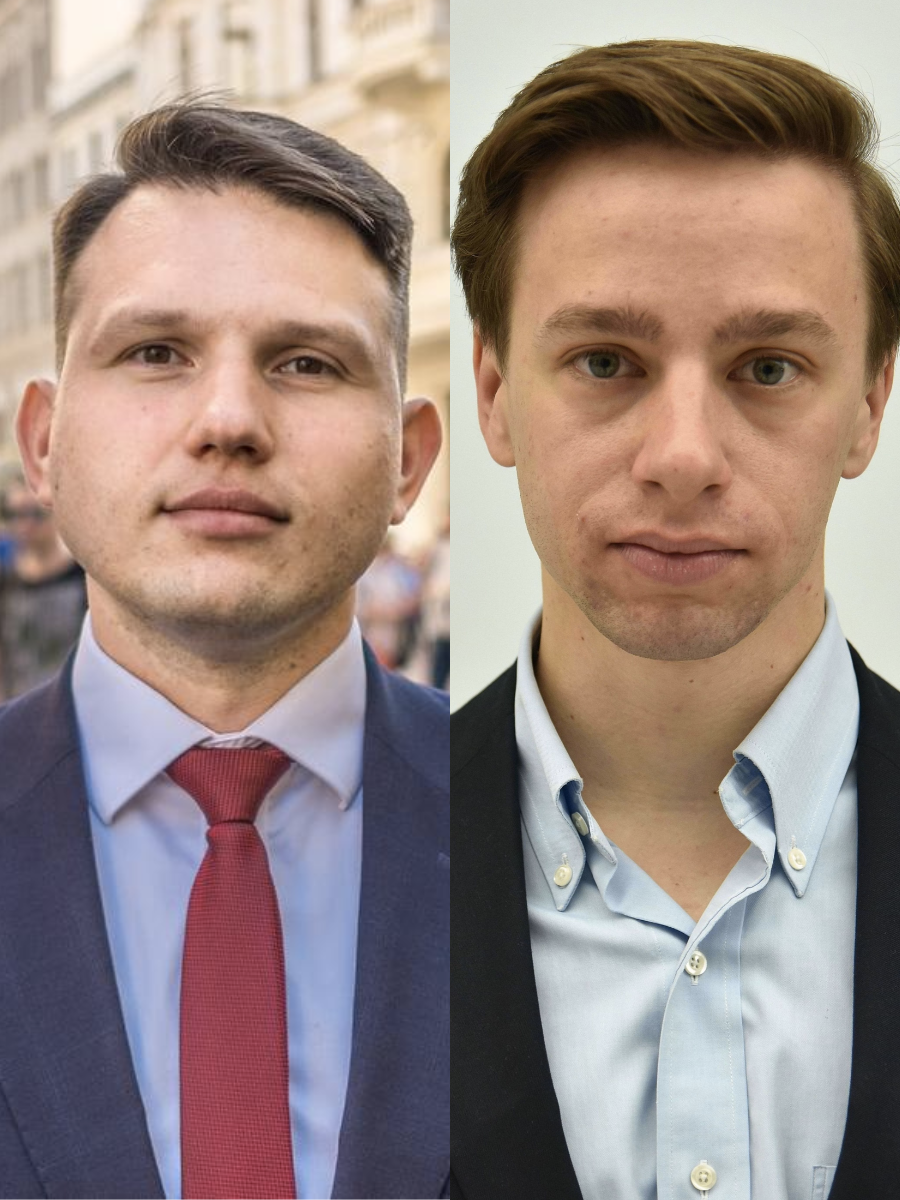

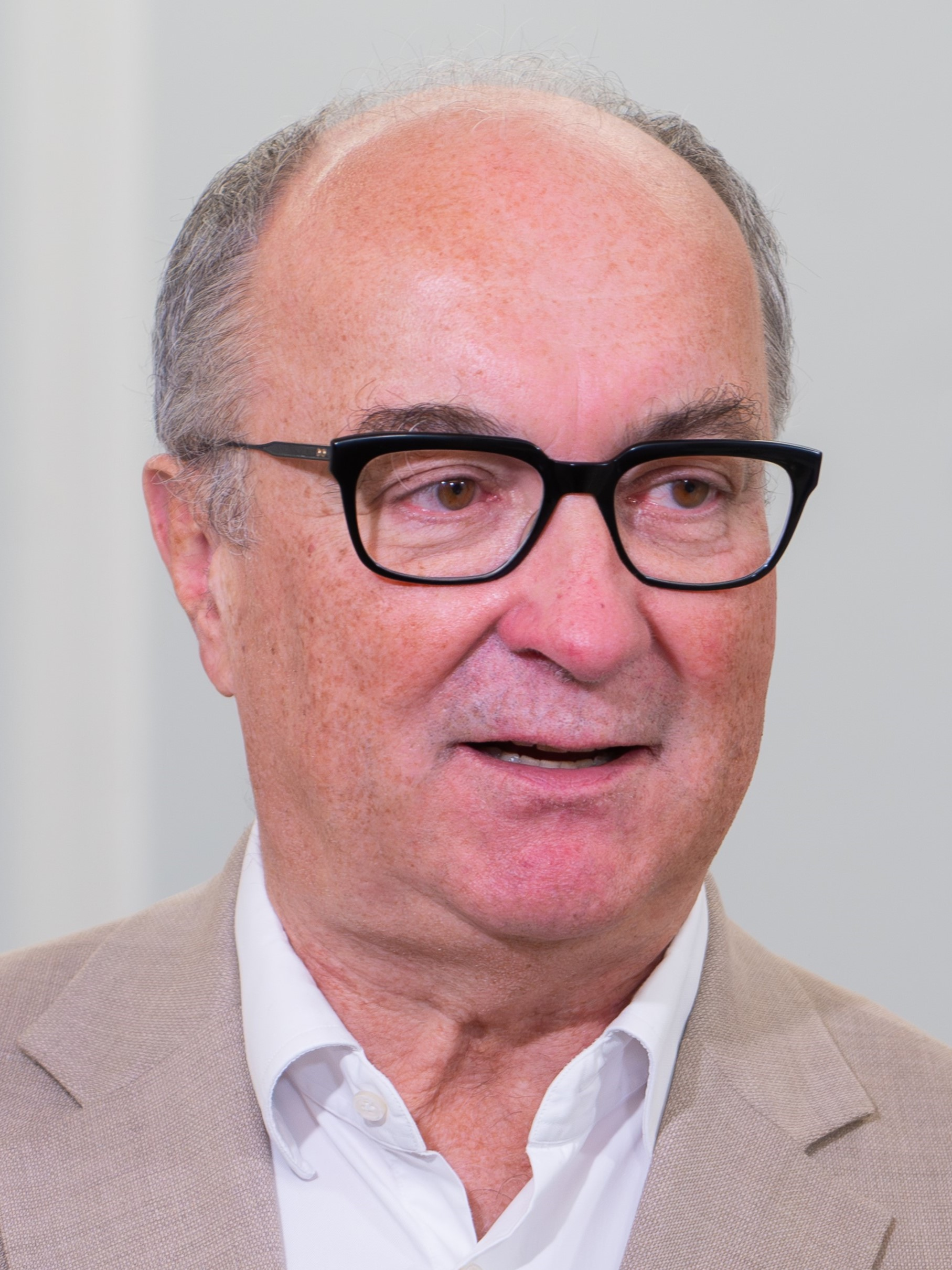

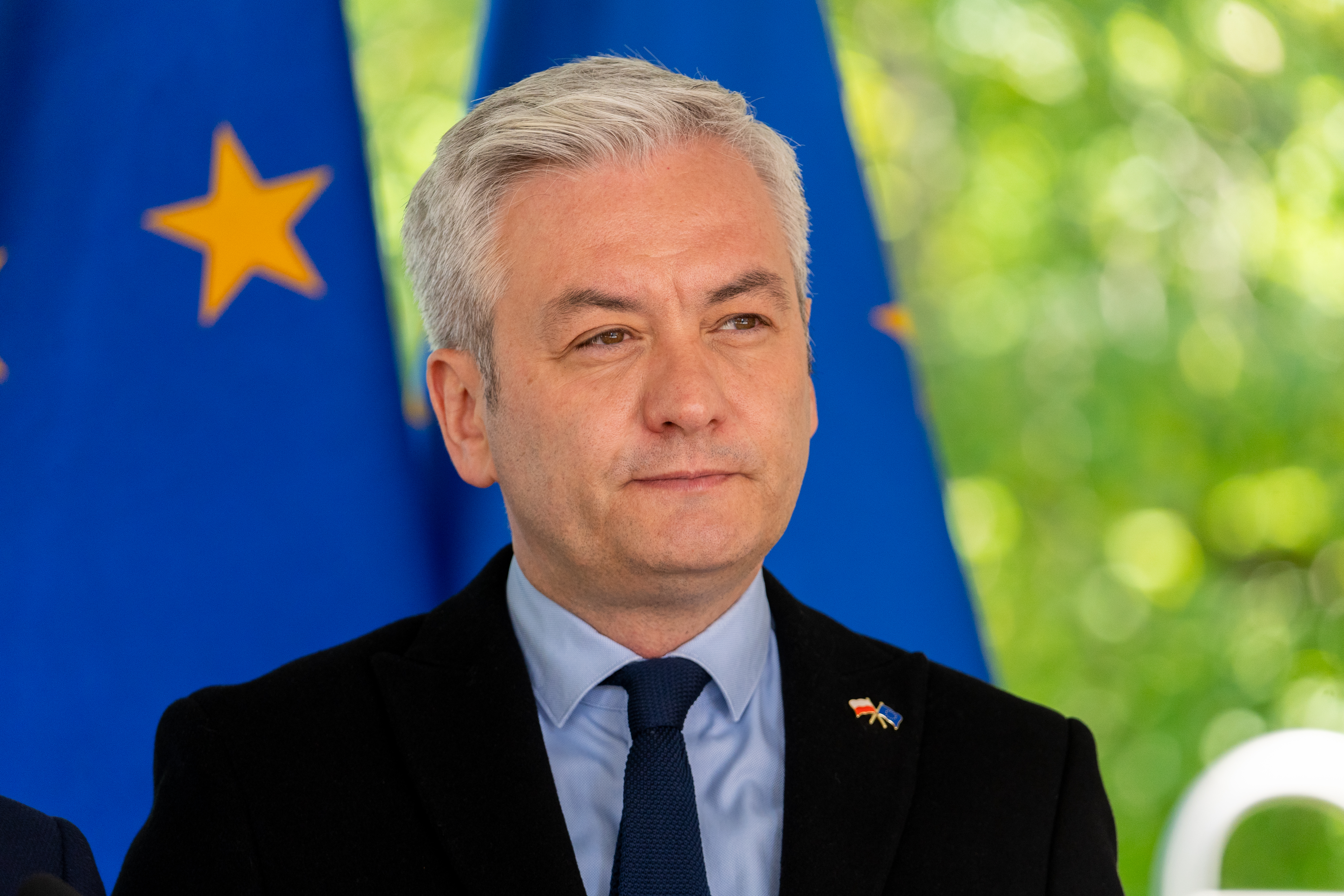

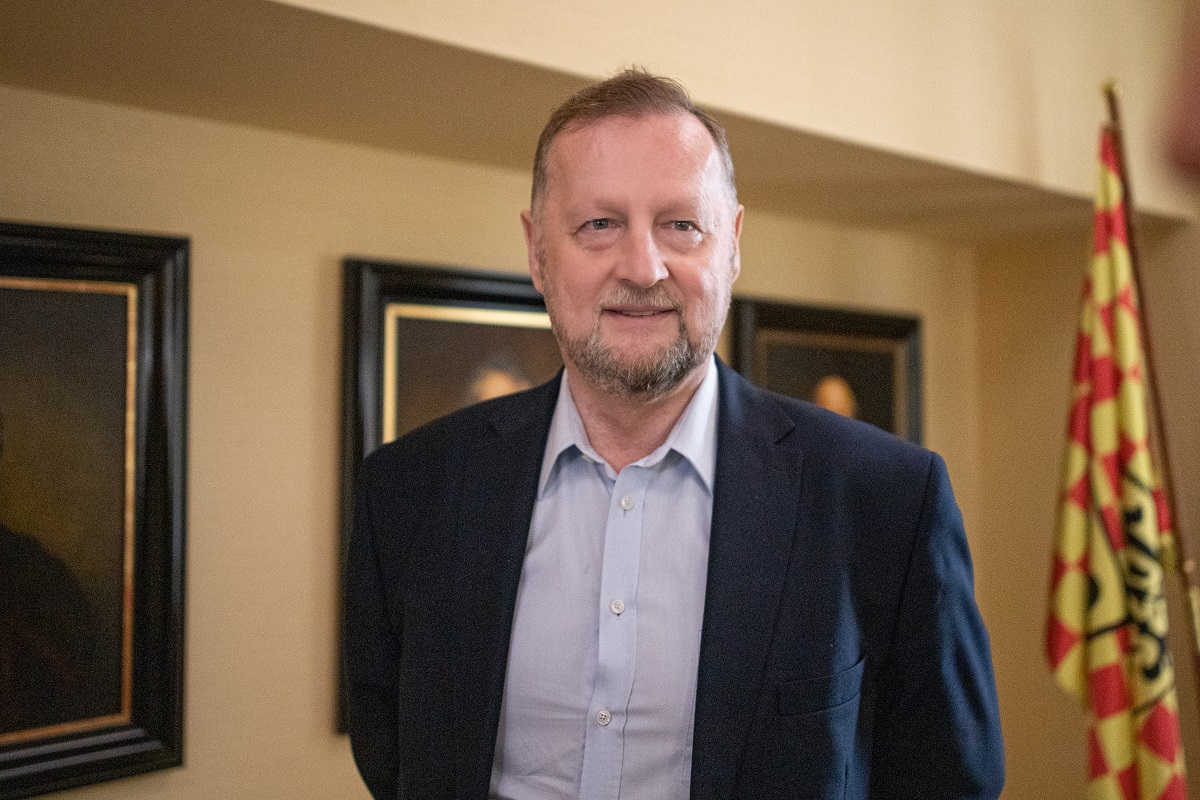
	First party	Second party	Third party
Leader	Jarosław Kaczyński	Donald Tusk	Władysław Kosiniak-Kamysz; Szymon Hołownia
Party	PiS	PO	PSL; Poland 2050
Alliance	United Right	Civic Coalition	Third Way
Last election	34.1%, 254 seats	28.1%, 194 seats (Note: Aggregate results of Platform.Modern Civic Coalition and The Greens.)	12.0%, 70 seats
Seats won	239	210	80
Seat change	▼15	▲16	▲10
Popular vote	4,941,092	4,409,607	2,054.152
Percentage	34.27%	30.59%	14.25%
Swing	▲0.14pp	▲2.47pp	▲2.18pp
	Fourth party	Fifth party	Sixth party
Leader	Sławomir Mentzen; Krzysztof Bosak	Włodzimierz Czarzasty; Robert Biedroń	Robert Raczyński
Party	NN; RN	NL	BS
Alliance	Confederation and Nonpartisans	The Left
Last election	2.8%, 0 seats (Note: Aggregate results of Liberty in Local Governments and National Movement.)	8.2%, 11 seats (Note: Aggregate results of SLD Left Together and Together.)	5.3%, 15 seats
Seats won	6	8	3
Seat change	▲6	▼3	▼12
Popular vote	1,042,328	911,430	434,086
Percentage	7.23%	6.32%	3.01%
Swing	▲4.38pp	▼1.87pp	▼2.27pp
- Result of the voivodeship sejmik elections

Local elections were held in Poland on 7 April 2024 to elect members for all 16 regional assemblies (sejmik wojewódzki), 314 county (powiat) councils, (Note: In addition to 314 county councils, there are 66 municipalities with powiat rights, which also perform the powers and duties of counties.) and 2477 municipal (gmina) councils, heads (wójt) of municipalities and mayors of cities, as well as 18 district councils of Warsaw. While Law and Justice remained the strongest party, the Civic Coalition and its partners saw some improvement, providing them with majorities in up to 11 of the 16 regional assemblies. The second round to elect heads of municipalities, mayors and city presidents was held on 21 April in places where no candidate obtained more than 50% of votes.

== Background ==
=== 2018 Polish local elections ===
Coalition agreements in voivodeships after the 2018 election. In November 2022 PiS lost power in Silesian Voivodeship, after 4 councillors left the party and joined the opposition, In 2024 the coalition agreement between PiS and BS in Lower Silesian Voivodeship was terminated, in favor of a PO-BS-NH one

In the previous local elections held in autumn 2018, Law and Justice (PiS), Poland's ruling party at the time, won the most votes in the regional assembly elections, allowing it to take power in eight of the 16 voivodeships, mainly in eastern and southern Poland. The runner-up, the centrist-liberal Civic Coalition (KO), received 27% of the vote, which allowed it to maintain control over 8 voivodeships, together with its coalition partners: the agrarian Polish People's Party (PSL), the Democratic Left Alliance (SLD) and, in the Opole Voivodeship, the German Minority. Mayoral elections in large cities were won by KO candidates or opposition-backed independents, notably in Warsaw, where Rafał Trzaskowski defeated PiS candidate Patryk Jaki in the first round, winning 57% of the vote. Both PiS and the opposition claimed victory in the elections. As of March 2024, PiS controls 6 regional assemblies, while KO with its coalition partners holds 10.

=== Extension of the terms of office of local authorities ===
The current legislation in Poland, enacted in 2018, stipulates that the term of office of local authorities is five years from the date of election. As the previous election was held in the autumn of 2018, the next election would have to be held in the autumn of 2023, and would coincide with the election of the parliament, whose term of office was expiring in November of that year.

In September 2022, a new legislation was passed by the parliament, exceptionally extending the terms of office of local authorities until 30 April 2024. The lawmakers indicated that the extension of the term of office was necessary to avoid the organisational problems associated with holding local and parliamentary elections at approximately the same time. The regulation was criticized by the Association of Voivodeships, a voluntary association of regional governments, the Union of Polish Cities, the Helsinki Foundation for Human Rights, the National Council of Legal Advisers, as well as by experts of the Senate Legislation Bureau. Critics have pointed out, among other things, that the act may violate fundamental constitutional principles. They also questioned the legitimacy of concerns about the simultaneous organisation of local and parliamentary elections, and pointed out that the act does not address these problems systemically, only incidentally.

The act was signed into law by President Andrzej Duda on 22 November 2022.

=== 2023 Polish parliamentary election ===
The parliamentary election held on 15 October 2023 saw the record turnout of over 74%. The ruling Law and Justice party received the highest number of votes, but lost its ability to form a majority government. Prime Minister Mateusz Morawiecki subsequently failed to form a coalition, and on 13 December a new government was formed under Donald Tusk, made up of the hitherto opposition parties: Civic Coalition, Poland 2050, Polish People's Party and the New Left.

== Electoral system ==
The members of the voivodeship sejmiks, county councils, municipal councils for municipalities with more than 20,000 inhabitants, and Warsaw district councils are elected proportionally using the D'Hondt method. Each voivodeship, county, municipality, and district is divided into multiple constituencies. Each voivodeship sejmik constituency elects between 5 and 15 councilors, each county council constituency elects between 3 and 10 councilors, and each municipal council and Warsaw district constituency elects between 5 and 8 councilors. Parties or coalitions are required to receive 5% of valid votes throughout the entire voivodeship, county, municipality or district in order to be eligible to earn seats.

Municipalities with 20,000 inhabitants or fewer are divided into 15 constituencies, each of which elects 1 councilor using first-past-the-post.

Heads of municipalities, mayors, and city presidents are directly elected in each municipality using the two-round system.

== Lists ==
=== National committees registered in all voivodeships ===
List			Ideology	Political position	Leader(s)	2018 result in Sejmiks		Candidates				
List			Ideology	Political position	Leader(s)	Votes (%)	Seats	Sejmiks	Powiats	Gminas	Mayors	Warsaw districts
1	PiS	Law and Justice; Prawo i Sprawiedliwość	National conservatism Right-wing populism	Right-wing	Jarosław Kaczyński	34.1%	254 / 552	720	8195	11746	446	532
2	KiBS	Confederation and Nonpartisan Localists; Konfederacja i Bezpartyjni Samorządowcy	Polish nationalism Economic liberalism	Far-right	Sławomir Mentzen; Krzysztof Bosak	2.9%	0 / 552	706	499	914	24	0
3	TD	Third Way; Trzecia Droga	Christian democracy Pro-Europeanism	Centre-right	Władysław Kosiniak-Kamysz; Szymon Hołownia	12.1%	70 / 552	719	5939	8024	328	280
4	L	The Left; Lewica	Social democracy Progressivism	Centre-left	Włodzimierz Czarzasty; Robert Biedroń; Magdalena Biejat; Adrian Zandberg	8.2%	11 / 552	698	844	1238	30	326
5	KO	Civic Coalition; Koalicja Obywatelska	Conservative liberalism Pro-Europeanism	Big tent	Donald Tusk	28.1%	194 / 552	720	5214	6293	173	568
6	BS	Bezpartyjni Samorządowcy (Note: Includes committee of the federation and committee of the party.)	Regionalism; Localism	Centre-left	Robert Raczyński	5.3%	15 / 552	485	242	451	21	23

=== National committees registered in more than one voivodeship ===
List		Ideology	Political position	Leader(s)	# of voivodeships	Candidates			
List		Ideology	Political position	Leader(s)	# of voivodeships	Sejmiks	Powiats	Gminas	Mayors
PL!SP	Liberal Poland – Entrepreneurs' Strike; Polska Liberalna Strajk Przedsiębiorców	Libertarianism; Populism	Centre-right	Paweł Tanajno	15	287	0	13	1
OKS	Local Government Coalition OK Self-Government; Koalicja Samorządowa OK Samorząd	Regionalism; Localism	Centre-left	Tadeusz Czajka	11	264	265	194	6
NK	Normal Country; Normalny Kraj	Anti-establishment; Right-wing populism	Right-wing	Wiesław Lewicki	10	202	0	23	1
RNP	Repair Poland Movement; Ruch Naprawy Polski	National democracy Economic nationalism	Fiscal: Left-wing; Social: Right-wing	Romuald Starosielec	7	125	15	114	3
ROP	Defence of Poland Movement (Note: Defence of Poland Movement registered separate committees in Subcarpathia and Silesia.); Ruch Obrony Polski	Christian right Polish nationalism	Far-right	Janusz Niemer	2	82	22	69	2

=== National and local committees registered in a single voivodeship ===
List		Ideology	Political position	Leader(s)	2018 result in Sejmiks		Voivodeship	Candidates			
List		Ideology	Political position	Leader(s)	Votes (%)	Seats	Voivodeship	Sejmiks	Powiats	Gminas	Mayors
AN	National Action (Note: Coalition of Confederation of the Polish Crown, There is One Poland, Real Politics Union, Safe Poland, Rodacy Kamraci, Roman Dmowski's National Party, Dmowski Club and Polish Thought Club in Łódź.); Akcja Narodowa	Polish nationalism Christian right	Far-right	Jan Waliszewski	0.0%	0 / 552	Łódź	29	0	49	1
BP	Azure Poland; Błękitna Polska	Localism; Christian right	Right-wing	Małgorzata Belska	N/A	0 / 552	Lesser Poland	8	0	36	1
DG	Good of the Gmina; Dobro Gminy	Localism	Centre	Bartosz Nowicki	N/A	0 / 552	West Pomeranian	5	5	15	1
GRM	Geothermal Rawa Mazowiecka; Geotermia Rawa Mazowiecka	Pro-geothermal energy Green politics	Centre-left	Monika Kobierska-Bednarek	N/A	0 / 552	Łódź	5	4	11	0
IOPT	Civic Initiative of Tarnogórski Powiat; Inicjatywa Obywatelska Powiatu Tarnogórskiego	Localism; Environmentalism	Centre	Mariusz Długajczyk	0.1%	0 / 552	Silesian	20	37	34	1
OdO	Citizens for Citizens; Obywatele dla Obywateli	Localism; Pro-farmers' protests	Right-wing	Robert Więcko	N/A	0 / 552	Podlaskie	37	0	0	0
RAŚ	Silesian Autonomy Movement; Ruch Autonomii Śląska	Silesian regionalism Autonomism	Centre-left	Jerzy Gorzelik	0.4% (Note: Compared to the result of Silesian Regional Party.)	0 / 552	Silesian	57	0	10	1
RSŁK	Self-Government Movement of Łukasz Konarski; Ruch Samorządowy Łukasza Konarskiego	Localism	Centre	Łukasz Konarski	N/A	0 / 552	Silesian	9	30	27	1
S	Self-Defence; Samoobrona	Agrarian socialism Catholic socialism	Left-wing to far-left	Jan Perkowski	N/A	0 / 552	Silesian	6	0	58	2
SRP	Self-Defence RP; Samoobrona RP	Agrarian socialism Catholic socialism	Left-wing to far-left	Krzysztof Prokopczyk	N/A	0 / 552	Masovian	16	0	0	0
SLD	Democratic Left Association; Stowarzyszenie Lewicy Demokratycznej	Social democracy	Centre-left to left-wing	Jerzy Teichert	N/A	0 / 552	Lubusz	40	0	35	0
OiS	Association Citizens and Justice; Stowarzyszenie Obywatele i Sprawiedliwość	Economic liberalism Environmentalism	Centre	Wojciech Papis	N/A	0 / 552	Masovian	32	0	6	0
SP	Association "Self-Governing Pomerania"; Stowarzyszenie "Samorządne Pomorze"	Regionalism; Christian right	Right-wing	Dariusz Męczykowski	N/A	0 / 552	Pomeranian	39	0	0	0
ŚS	Silesian Localists; Śląscy Samorządowcy	Minority interests Social market economy	Centre-left	Ryszard Galla	0.3%	5 / 552	Opole	38	148	294	15
ŚR	Silesians Together; Ślonzoki Razem	Localism; Silesian autonomism	Centre-left	Leon Swaczyna	0.4%	0 / 552	Silesian	38	0	0	0
ZS	Slavic Union; Związek Słowiański	Agrarianism; Economic nationalism	Left-wing	Włodzimierz Rynkowski	0.0%	0 / 552	Masovian	53	0	7	0

=== Other national committees ===
List		Ideology	Political position	Leader(s)	2018 result in Sejmiks		Candidates			
List		Ideology	Political position	Leader(s)	Votes (%)	Seats	Sejmiks	Powiats	Gminas	Mayors
B	Nonpartisans; Bezpartyjni	Libertarian conservatism Conservative liberalism	Right-wing to far-right	Piotr Bakun	N/A	0 / 552	0	0	69	1
BiN	Nonpartisans and Independents; Bezpartyjni i Niezależni	Localism	Centre-left	Kamil Suchański	N/A	0 / 552	0	0	4	0
KP	Pro-Polish Confederation (Note: Confederation dissidents in Poznań.); Konfederacja Propolska	Polish nationalism Economic liberalism	Far-right	Ziemowit Przebitkowski	N/A	0 / 552	0	0	27	0
PSLTD	Agreement Serves People – Third Way (Note: Polish People's Party dissidents.); Porozumienie Służy Ludziom – Trzecia Droga	Agrarianism; Christian democracy	Centre-right	Krzysztof Filiński	N/A	0 / 552	0	191	225	5
PRP	Right Wing of the Republic; Prawica Rzeczypospolitej	National conservatism Social conservatism	Right-wing	Krzysztof Kawęcki	N/A	0 / 552	0	0	13	1
SNG	Safe Next Generation – Safe Civic Generation; Safe Next Generation – Bezpieczne Pokolenie Obywatelskie	Grassroots democracy Liberalism	Centre-left	Laura Starowiejska	N/A	0 / 552	0	0	21	1
ONRP	Association Renewal of the Republic of Poland; Stowarzyszenie OdNowa Rzeczypospolitej Polskiej	Conservatism	Centre-right	Marcin Ociepa	N/A	0 / 552	0	39	34	1
SL"O"	People's Party "Patrimony" RP; Stronnictwo Ludowe "Ojcowizna" RP	Agrarianism; Conservatism	Right-wing	Wieńczysław Nowacki	N/A	0 / 552	0	0	7	0
SP	Sovereign Poland; Suwerenna Polska	Polish nationalism Christian right	Right-wing to far-right	Zbigniew Ziobro	N/A	0 / 552	0	0	27	1
WiS	Free and Solidary; Wolni i Solidarni	Solidarism; Conservatism	Right-wing	Jan Miller	0.8%	0 / 552	0	3	11	0
ZP	Healthy Poland; Zdrowa Polska	Conspiracism; Vaccine hesitancy	Far-right	Jan Waliszewski	N/A	0 / 552	0	0	5	0

== Electoral committees ==
A total of 11,202 committees were registered for the elections. 41 committees applied for nationwide registration by the National Electoral Commission, of which 35 have been registered: 21 political parties, nine organizations, three coalitions and two voters committees. Four committees were rejected and one committee retracted its registration.

Electoral committees
	Type	Committee	Status	Sejmiks	Powiat councils	Gmina councils	Mayors	Warsaw district councils
1	Coalition	Civic Coalition	Fielded lists	Yes	Yes	Yes	Yes	Yes
2	Party	Nonpartisan Local Government Activists (Note: Different factions of Nonpartisan Local Government Activists are represented by a political party as well as an organization and a federation of organisations. Additionally regional chapters in some voivodeships will run in coalition with Confederation.)	Fielded lists	No	No	Yes	No	No
3	Party	Normal Country	Fielded lists	Yes	No	Yes	Yes	No
4	Organization	Association Citizens and Justice	Fielded lists	Yes	No	Yes	No	No
5	Party	Slavic Union	Fielded lists	Yes	No	Yes	No	No
6	Party	Repair Poland Movement	Fielded lists	Yes	Yes	Yes	Yes	No
7	Organization	National Polish Federation "Nonpartisans and Local Government Activists"	Registered	No	No	No	No	No
8	Party	Self-Defence	Fielded lists	Yes	No	Yes	Yes	No
9	Organization	Trade Union of Polish Agriculture Free and Solidary	Rejected	No	No	No	No	No
10	Organization	Local Government Coalition OK Self-Government	Fielded lists	Yes	Yes	Yes	Yes	No
11	Party	People's Party "Patrimony" RP	Rejected	No	No	No	No	No
12	Party	Law and Justice	Fielded lists	Yes	Yes	Yes	Yes	Yes
13	Party	Silesians Together	Fielded lists	Yes	No	No	No	No
14	Coalition	The Left	Fielded lists	Yes	Yes	Yes	Yes	Yes
15	Party	PolExit	Registered	No	No	No	No	No
16	Organization	Safe Next Generation – Safe Civic Generation	Fielded lists	No	No	Yes	Yes	No
17	Organization	Association "Nonpartisan Local Government Activists"	Fielded lists	Yes	Yes	Yes	Yes	Yes
18	Voters	Confederation and Nonpartisan Local Government Activists	Fielded lists	Yes	Yes	Yes	Yes	No
19	Voters	Local Government Coalition OK Self-Government	Called for correction	No	No	No	No	No
20	Party	Right Wing of the Republic	Fielded lists	No	No	Yes	Yes	No
21	Party	Liberal Poland – Entrepreneurs' Strike	Fielded lists	Yes	No	Yes	Yes	No
22	Party	Sovereign Poland	Fielded lists	No	No	Yes	Yes	No
23	Party	Free and Solidary	Fielded lists	No	Yes	Yes	No	No
24	Organization	Association Nonpartisan and Independent	Fielded lists	No	No	Yes	No	No
25	Coalition	Third Way PSL-PL2050 of Szymon Hołownia	Fielded lists	Yes	Yes	Yes	Yes	Yes
26	Voters	Renewal of the Republic of Poland (Note: Renewal of the Republic of Poland retracted their registration as a voters committee and registered as an organization instead.)	Retracted	No	No	No	No	No
27	Organization	Democratic Left Association	Fielded lists	Yes	No	Yes	No	No
28	Party	Movement of Unity of Poles	Registered	No	No	No	No	No
29	Party	Labour Faction	Registered	No	No	No	No	No
30	Party	Self-Defence RP	Fielded lists	Yes	No	No	No	No
31	Voters	Agreement Serves People – Third Way	Fielded lists	No	Yes	Yes	Yes	No
32	Party	Pro-Polish Confederation	Fielded lists	No	No	Yes	No	No
33	Party	Normal Poland	Registered	No	No	No	No	No
34	Party	Free Europe	Registered	No	No	No	No	No
35	Party	Nonpartisans	Fielded lists	No	No	Yes	Yes	No
36	Organization	Healthy Poland	Fielded lists	No	No	Yes	No	No
37	Voters	It's High Time	Rejected	No	No	No	No	No
38	Party	People's Party "Patrimony" RP	Fielded lists	No	No	Yes	No	No
39	Organization	Renewal of the Republic of Poland	Fielded lists	No	Yes	Yes	Yes	No
40	Party	Polska 2050 (Note: Not related to Poland 2050 of Szymon Hołownia.)	Registered	No	No	No	No	No
41	Voters	Public Control	Rejected	No	No	No	No	No

== Campaigning ==
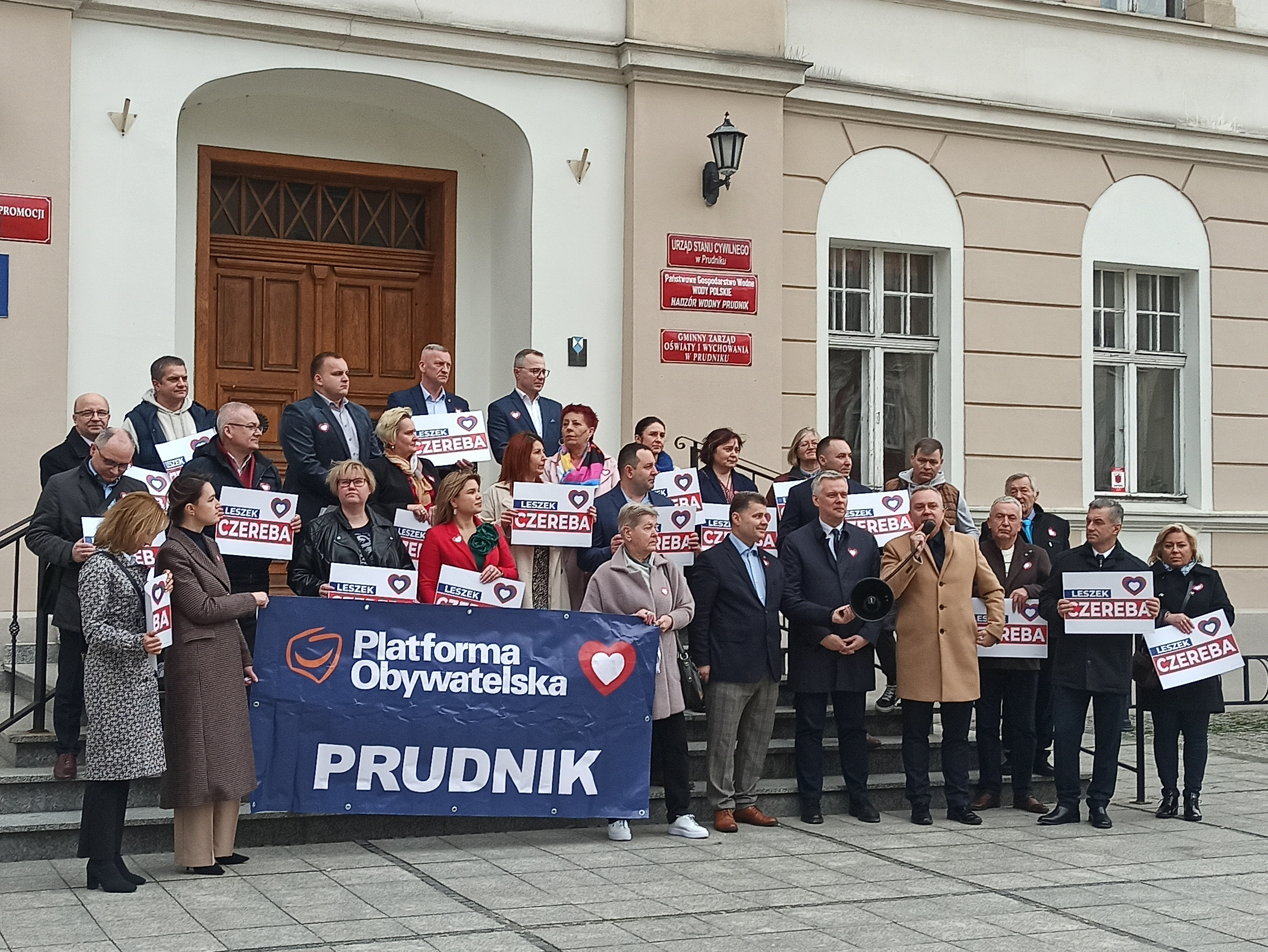
Civic Coalition campaign in Prudnik

Prime Minister Donald Tusk said that a victory for the ruling Civic Coalition is necessary to prevent a return to nationalist rule by the Law and Justice Party, and portrayed its electoral campaign as a defense of "freedom, human rights, women's rights, democracy, free economy, self-government". Law and Justice denied such accusations throughout the campaign, with its leader Jarosław Kaczyński accusing the government of lying and calling the election an opportunity to present it with a "yellow card".

== Results ==
Exit polls showed that Law and Justice won 33.7% and the Civic Coalition won 31.9% in elections to the regional assemblies. The Third Way coalition was projected to win 13.5%, the Left 6.8% and the Confederation party 7.5%.

Results also showed that the mayor of Warsaw, Rafał Trzaskowski (Civic Coalition), won an outright victory in the first round, as did the mayor of Gdańsk, Aleksandra Dulkiewicz (Civic Coalition-supported independent). Winners were also proclaimed in the first round for mayoral races in Bydgoszcz (Rafał Bruski, Civic Coalition), Lublin (Krzysztof Żuk, Civic Coalition), Opole (Arkadiusz Wiśniewski, Civic Coalition-supported independent), Białystok (Tadeusz Truskolaski, Civic Coalition-supported independent), Katowice (Marcin Krupa, Civic Coalition-supported independent), Szczecin (Piotr Krzystek, Civic Coalition-supported independent), and Łódź (Hanna Zdanowska, Civic Coalition), while those in Wrocław, Toruń, Zielona Góra, Gorzów Wielkopolski, Kraków, Rzeszów. Olsztyn, Poznań and Kielce were to undergo a runoff. In the second round of elections held in 748 cities and towns on 21 April, the Civic Coalition won the mayoral elections in Kraków, Poznań, Wrocław, Rzeszów, Toruń, Zielona Góra and Legnica.

== Voivodeship councils ==
=== Total ===
Party	Votes	%	+/–	Seats	+/–
Law and Justice	4,941,092	34.27	▲0.14	239	▼15
Civic Coalition	4,409,607	30.59	▲3.62	210	▲16
Third Way	2,054,152	14.25	▲2.18	80	▲10
Confederation and Nonpartisan Localists	1,042,328	7.23	▲4.38	6	▲6
The Left	911,430	6.32	▼1.87	8	▼3
Bezpartyjni Samorządowcy	434,086	3.01	▼2.27	3	▼12
National Polish Local Government Coalition	165,714	1.15	New	1	New
Normal Country	86,994	0.60	New	0	New
Silesian Localists	53,338	0.37	▲0.03	5	Steady
Liberal Poland – Entrepreneurs' Strike	52,160	0.36	New	0	New
Silesian Autonomy Movement	50,361	0.35	▼0.03	0	Steady
Defence of Poland Movement	37,283	0.26	New	0	New
Silesians Together	36,730	0.25	▼0.12	0	Steady
Repair Poland Movement	34,457	0.24	New	0	New
Self-Governed Pomerania	32,709	0.23	New	0	New
Democratic Left Association	13,169	0.09	New	0	New
Slavic Union	11,565	0.08	▲0.06	0	Steady
National Action	9,231	0.06	▲0.02	0	Steady
Citizens for Citizens	8,590	0.06	New	0	New
Citizens and Justice	7,177	0.05	New	0	New
Self-Defence of the Republic of Poland	5,923	0.04	New	0	New
Civic Initiative	5,495	0.04	▼0.05	0	Steady
Good of the Gmina	3,499	0.02	New	0	New
Movement of Łukasz Konarski	3,494	0.02	New	0	New
Azure Poland	2,883	0.02	New	0	New
Geothermal Rawa Mazowiecka	2,281	0.02	New	0	New
Self-Defence	1,317	0.01	New	0	New
Total	14,417,065	100.00	–	552	0
Valid votes	14,417,065	95.56			
Invalid/blank votes	670,255	4.44			
Total votes	15,087,320	100.00			
Registered voters/turnout	29,046,002	51.94			

=== Election results (%) ===
Voivodeship Council												
Voivodeship Council	PiS	KO	TD	KiBS	L	BS	OKS	NK	ŚS	PL!SP	RNP	Others
Lower Silesia	27.48	33.52	11.43	6.19	7.05	10.55	2.32	0.73	—	0.73	—	—
Kuyavia-Pomerania	28.15	38.30	17.18	6.54	6.86	1.55	0.23	—	—	1.20	—	—
Lublin	47.17	19.18	15.19	8.66	4.73	2.96	0.45	0.75	—	0.55	0.35	—
Lubusz	25.04	34.73	18.67	6.24	8.33	2.42	0.17	—	—	0.41	0.22	3.75 (Note: Democratic Left Association)
Łódź	37.57	30.41	14.21	6.62	6.35	2.60	—	0.33	—	0.57	0.15	1.20 (Note: National Action – 0.96 Geothermal Rawa Mazowiecka – 0.24)
Lesser Poland	43.90	25.94	12.39	7.95	4.74	2.61	1.03	1.16	—	0.05	—	0.22 (Note: Azure Poland)
Masovia	33.16	31.52	16.54	6.84	6.94	2.38	0.23	0.60	—	—	0.70	1.09 (Note: Slavic Union – 0.51 Association Citizens and Justice – 0.32 Self-Defence RP – 0.26)
Opole	25.30	36.47	9.34	5.93	3.63	2.02	—	—	16.22	1.09	—	—
Subcarpathian	51.96	16.26	12.35	9.91	3.82	2.75	—	—	—	0.19	—	2.76 (Note: Defence of Poland Movement)
Podlaskie	43.47	22.75	16.45	9.95	3.43	1.38	0.16	0.28	—	0.21	—	1.92 (Note: Citizens for Citizens)
Pomerania	25.70	43.84	10.32	6.63	6.25	3.05	—	—	—	0.14	0.24	3.83 (Note: Association "Self-Governing Pomerania")
Silesia	31.09	32.41	10.62	6.86	8.22	2.30	0.27	0.50	—	0.25	0.36	7.13 (Note: Silesian Autonomy Movement – 3.21 Silesians Together – 2.34 Defence of Poland Movement – 0.91 Civic Initiative of Tarnogórski Powiat – 0.35 Self-Government Movement of Łukasz Konarski – 0.22 Self-Defence – 0.08)
Świętokrzyskie	42.00	18.72	21.71	9.15	4.08	1.79	1.23	—	—	0.18	1.14	—
Warmia-Masuria	30.73	34.90	16.62	7.47	6.30	2.65	—	1.04	—	0.28	—	—
Greater Poland	26.90	32.01	17.49	6.61	7.64	3.00	4.30	1.43	—	0.62	—	—
West Pomerania	25.05	38.88	10.61	5.65	7.87	1.19	8.41	1.39	—	0.36	—	0.60 (Note: Good of the Gmina)
Poland	34.27	30.59	14.25	7.23	6.32	3.01	1.15	0.60	0.37	0.36	0.24	1.61
Source: National Electoral Commission

=== Seats distribution ===
Voivodeship Council									
Voivodeship Council	PiS	KO	TD	KiBS	L	BS	OKS	ŚS	Total
Lower Silesia	13	15	4	—	1	3	—	—	36
Kuyavia-Pomerania	11	14	5	—	—	—	—	—	30
Lublin	21	6	5	1	—	—	—	—	33
Lubusz	10	14	6	—	—	—	—	—	30
Łódź	16	12	4	—	1	—	—	—	33
Lesser Poland	21	12	6	—	—	—	—	—	39
Masovia	21	20	8	1	1	—	—	—	51
Opole	10	14	1	—	—	—	—	5	30
Subcarpathian	21	6	4	2	—	—	—	—	33
Podlaskie	15	8	6	1	—	—	—	—	30
Pomerania	10	20	3	—	—	—	—	—	33
Silesia	18	20	5	—	2	—	—	—	45
Świętokrzyskie	16	6	7	1	—	—	—	—	30
Warmia-Masuria	11	13	6	—	—	—	—	—	30
Greater Poland	15	15	7	—	2	—	—	—	39
West Pomerania	10	15	3	—	1	—	1	—	30
Poland	239	210	80	6	8	3	1	5	552
Source: National Electoral Commission

== Powiat councils ==
Party	Votes	%	+/–	Seats	+/–
Law and Justice	3,014,506	29.94	▼0.52	2,080	▼34
Civic Coalition	1,632,107	16.21	▲3.92	1,056	▲330
Third Way	1,238,626	12.30	▼1.92	716	▼236
The Left	96,787	0.96	▼1.81	36	▼69
National Polish Local Government Coalition	68,281	0.68	New	19	New
Confederation and Nonpartisan Localists	60,240	0.60	▲0.60	5	▲5
Silesian Localists	42,010	0.42	▼0.04	36	▼9
Agreement Serves People – Third Way	28,800	0.29	New	17	New
Bezpartyjni Samorządowcy	28,793	0.29	▼0.57	7	▼29
Civic Initiative of Tarnogórski Powiat	13,543	0.13	▼0.01	7	▼2
Movement of Łukasz Konarski	4,518	0.04	New	2	New
Association Renewal of the Republic of Poland	3,513	0.03	New	0	New
Defence of Poland Movement	1,622	0.02	New	0	New
Repair Poland Movement	740	0.01	New	0	New
Good of the Gmina	471	0.00	New	0	New
Free and Solidary	347	0.00	▼0.05	0	Steady
Geothermal Rawa Mazowiecka	93	0.00	New	0	New
Other and local committees	3,833,974	38.08	▼0.66	2,189	▼68
Total	10,068,971	100.00	–	6,170	▼74
Source: National Electoral Commission

== Gmina councils ==
Party	Votes	%	+/–	Seats	+/–
Civic Coalition	2,235,842	15.68	▲4.31	1,649	▲551
Law and Justice	1,933,934	13.56	▼7.52	3,069	▼2,739
Third Way	673,598	4.72	▲0.35	1,909	▼1,291
The Left	226,156	1.59	▼0.86	86	▼221
Confederation and Nonpartisan Localists	141,056	0.99	▲0.86	17	▲13
Bezpartyjni Samorządowcy	34,935	0.24	▼0.27	68	▲15
Nonpartisans	21,607	0.15	New	0	New
Silesian Localists	18,179	0.13	▼0.04	178	▼29
Agreement Serves People – Third Way	14,447	0.10	New	27	New
Local Government Coalition OK Self-Government	9,894	0.07	New	28	New
Prosperity and Peace Movement	2,864	0.02	New	14	New
Repair Poland Movement	8,097	0.06	New	6	New
Civic Initiative of Tarnogórski Powiat	6,334	0.04	▼0.03	7	▼5
Pro-Polish Confederation	6,026	0.04	New	0	New
Defence of Poland Movement	3,781	0.03	New	4	New
Movement of Łukasz Konarski	2,727	0.02	New	3	New
National Action	2,359	0.02	▲0.01	0	Steady
Self-Defence	2,165	0.02	▲0.01	10	▲7
Azure Poland	1,615	0.01	New	1	New
Association Renewal of the Republic of Poland	1,566	0.01	New	1	New
Safe Next Generation – Safe Civic Generation	997	0.01	New	0	New
Democratic Left Association	990	0.01	New	0	New
Normal Country	832	0.01	New	1	New
Free and Solidary	757	0.01	▼0.05	2	▼11
Right Wing of the Republic	614	0.00	▼0.01	5	▼4
Liberal Poland – Entrepreneurs' Strike	607	0.00	New	0	New
Silesian Autonomy Movement	577	0.00	▼0.12	1	▼10
Geothermal Rawa Mazowiecka	542	0.00	New	1	New
Good of the Gmina	458	0.00	New	2	New
People's Party "Patrimony" RP	377	0.00	▼0.01	0	▼4
Sovereign Poland	378	0.00	New	2	New
Rodacy Kamraci	327	0.00	New	0	New
United Beyond Boundaries	191	0.00	New	1	New
Nonpartisans and Independents	171	0.00	New	0	New
Citizens and Justice	154	0.00	New	0	New
Healthy Poland	151	0.00	New	0	New
Slavic Union	69	0.00	New	0	New
Other and local committees	8,903,930	62.44	▲4.55	32,324	▲3,643
Total	14,259,304	100.00	–	39,416	▼108
Source: PKW

== Mayors ==
Party or alliance		First round			Second round			Total seats	+/–
Party or alliance		Votes	%	Mayors	Votes	%	Mayors	Total seats	+/–
Civic Coalition	Civic Platform	1,522,121	10.40	13	765,541	14.54	27	40	▲15
Civic Coalition	New Left	1,944	0.01	0				0	New
Civic Coalition	Modern	1,240	0.01	0				0	Steady
Civic Coalition	Independents	335,094	2.29	5	123,552	2.35	4	9	▲1
Civic Coalition	Total	1,860,399	12.71	18	889,093	16.88	31	49	▲16
Law and Justice	Law and Justice	1,052,984	7.19	61	352,033	6.69	15	76	▼72
Law and Justice	Sovereign Poland	10,265	0.07	0	9,672	0.18	0	0	▼2
Law and Justice	Independents	492,820	3.37	21	68,534	1.30	8	29	▼54
Law and Justice	Total	1,556,069	10.63	82	430,239	8.17	23	105	▼129
Third Way	Polish People's Party	209,110	1.43	62	33,899	0.64	5	67	▼78
Third Way	Poland 2050 (Note: Includes 7,964 votes and 0 seats in the first round for supported independents.)	160,023	1.09	0	62,582	1.19	1	1	New
Third Way	Civic Platform	766	0.01	0	1,026	0.02	0	0	New
Third Way	Independents	156,139	1.07	16	32,183	0.61	10	26	▼2
Third Way	Total	526,038	3.59	78	129,690	2.46	16	94	▼79
The Left	Left Together	101,950	0.70	0				0	New
The Left	New Left	99,951	0.68	0	59,015	1.12	2	2	▼3
The Left	Independents	13,385	0.09	0				0	▼1
The Left	Total	215,286	1.47	0	59,015	1.12	2	2	▼4
Confederation and Nonpartisan Localists	New Hope	68,200	0.47	0				0	Steady
Confederation and Nonpartisan Localists	Confederation	14,854	0.10	0				0	New
Confederation and Nonpartisan Localists	National Movement	7,274	0.05	0				0	Steady
Confederation and Nonpartisan Localists	New Democracy - Yes	7,149	0.05	0				0	New
Confederation and Nonpartisan Localists	Confederation of the Polish Crown	5,125	0.04	0				0	New
Confederation and Nonpartisan Localists	Independents	15,813	0.11	0				0	Steady
Confederation and Nonpartisan Localists	Total	118,415	0.81	0				0	Steady
Bezpartyjni Samorządowcy	Confederation	562	0.00	0				0	New
Bezpartyjni Samorządowcy	Law and Justice	320	0.00	0				0	New
Bezpartyjni Samorządowcy	Independents	32,977	0.23	1	3,798	0.07	2	3	Steady
Bezpartyjni Samorządowcy	Total	33,859	0.23	1	3,798	0.07	2	3	Steady
Silesian Localists	Regional. Minority with Majority	4,148	0.03	3				3	▲1
Silesian Localists	Independents	17,123	0.12	9	4,112	0.08	0	9	▼2
Silesian Localists	Total	21,271	0.15	12	4,112	0.08	0	12	▼1
Nonpartisans	Confederation	10,839	0.07	0				0	New
Agreement Serves People – Third Way	Polish People's Party	8,232	0.06	0				0	New
Agreement Serves People – Third Way	Independents	359	0.00	0				0	New
Agreement Serves People – Third Way	Total	8,591	0.06	0				0	New
Civic Initiative of Tarnogórski Powiat	Independents	7,811	0.05	0	9,796	0.19	1	1	Steady
Repair Poland Movement	Repair Poland Movement	6,019	0.04	0				0	New
Repair Poland Movement	Independents	1,639	0.01	0				0	New
Repair Poland Movement	Total	7,658	0.05	0				0	New
Self-Government Movement of Łukasz Konarski	Independents	4,746	0.03	0	6,818	0.13	0	0	New
Local Government Coalition; OK Self-Government	Independents	4,726	0.03	0	1,832	0.03	0	0	New
National Action	Confederation of the Polish Crown	1,991	0.01	0				0	Steady
Defence of Poland Movement	There is One Poland	1,853	0.01	0				0	New
Safe Next Generation – Safe Civic Generation	Independents	1,540	0.01	0				0	New
Azure Poland	Independents	1,492	0.01	0				0	New
Silesian Autonomy Movement	Independents	1,279	0.01	0				0	▼1
Liberal Poland – Entrepreneurs' Strike	Independents	1,197	0.01	0				0	New
Association Renewal of the Republic of Poland	Independents	804	0.01	0				0	New
Good of the Gmina	Independents	666	0.00	0	1,028	0.02	1	1	New
Sovereign Poland	Independents	343	0.00	0				0	New
Right Wing of the Republic	Independents	336	0.00	0				0	Steady
Self-Defence	Independents	140	0.00	0				0	Steady
Normal Country	Independents	76	0.00	0				0	New
Other and local committees	Civic Platform (Note: Includes 32,211 votes and 2 seats in the first round; 16,523 votes and 2 seats in the second round for supported independents.)	625,599	4.27	54	255,037	4.84	28	82	▼23
Other and local committees	Law and Justice (Note: Includes 55,410 votes and 10 seats in the first round; 18,027 votes and 4 seats in the second round for supported independents.)	588,001	4.02	98	193,770	3.68	31	129	▲47
Other and local committees	Polish People's Party	355,011	2.42	90	93,586	1.78	22	112	▼29
Other and local committees	New Left	105,239	0.72	13	25,237	0.48	3	16	▼17
Other and local committees	Poland 2050 (Note: Includes 11,811 votes and 0 seats in the first round; 15,895 votes and 0 seats in the second round for supported independents.)	97,722	0.67	1	39,532	0.75	3	4	New
Other and local committees	New Hope	30,279	0.21	0	10,755	0.20	1	1	▲1
Other and local committees	Left Together	24,302	0.17	0				0	▼1
Other and local committees	Confederation of the Polish Crown	11,880	0.08	0				0	New
Other and local committees	There is One Poland	10,890	0.07	0	11,195	0.21	1	1	New
Other and local committees	Confederation	9,554	0.07	0				0	New
Other and local committees	National Movement	8,967	0.06	0				0	Steady
Other and local committees	Sovereign Poland	8,358	0.06	0	3,683	0.07	1	1	▼4
Other and local committees	Modern	7,117	0.05	1	1,277	0.02	1	2	▼1
Other and local committees	Polish Pirate Party	5,368	0.04	0				0	New
Other and local committees	Labour Union	2,759	0.02	1				1	▼1
Other and local committees	Agreement for Democracy	2,318	0.02	1	805	0.02	0	1	▼9
Other and local committees	„Piast” Faction	1,445	0.01	0				0	▼1
Other and local committees	Safe Poland	295	0.00	0				0	New
Other and local committees	Kukiz'15	214	0.00	0				0	New
Other and local committees	Social Alternative	99	0.00	0				0	New
Other and local committees	Independents	8,359,697	57.09	1,278	3,095,639	58.79	581	1,859	▲240
Other and local committees	Total	10,255,114	70.04	1537	3,730,516	70.84	672	2209	▲204
Total		14,642,539	100.00	1,728	5,265,937	100.00	748	2,476	▲1
Valid votes		14,642,539	97.15		5,265,937	99.16			
Invalid/blank votes		429,194	2.85		44,495	0.84			
Total votes		15,071,733	100.00		5,310,432	100.00			
Registered voters/turnout		28,990,775	51.99		12,051,596	44.06			
Source: PKW

=== Total elected mayors by alliance and party ===
Party or alliance		Mayors	+/–
United Right	Law and Justice	191	▼6
United Right	Sovereign Poland	1	▼5
United Right	Independents	43	▼73
United Right	Total	235	▼88
Third Way	Polish People's Party	179	▼107
Third Way	Poland 2050	5	New
Third Way	Independents	26	▼2
Third Way	Total	210	▼104
Civic Coalition	Civic Platform	118	▼10
Civic Coalition	Modern	2	▼1
Civic Coalition	Independents	13	▲3
Civic Coalition	Total	133	▼8
The Left	New Left	18	▼20
The Left	Labour Union	1	▼1
The Left	Total	19	▼23
Silesian Localists	Regional. Minority with Majority	3	Steady
Silesian Localists	Independents	9	▼2
Silesian Localists	Total	12	▼2
Bezpartyjni Samorządowcy	Independents	3	Steady
Confederation and Nonpartisan Localists	New Hope	1	▲1
Civic Initiative of Tarnogórski Powiat	Independents	1	Steady
Good of the Gmina	Independents	1	New
Other and local committees	There is One Poland	1	New
Other and local committees	Agreement for Democracy	1	▼10
Other and local committees	Independents	1,859	▲240
Other and local committees	Total	1,861	▲230
Total		2,476	▲1
Source: National Electoral Commission

== Voivodeship capital mayoral and council elections ==
Bold – elected candidates

=== Warsaw ===
Warsaw Mayor

Candidate	Party	Votes	%
**Rafał Trzaskowski** (incumbent)	Civic Coalition (PO)	444,006	57.41
Tobiasz Bocheński	Law and Justice (Ind.)	178,652	23.10
Magdalena Biejat	The Left (Together) (Note: Supported by The City Is Ours.)	99,442	12.86
Przemysław Wipler	Confederation (NN)	34,389	4.45
Janusz Korwin-Mikke	Bezpartyjni Samorządowcy (KORWiN)	10,839	1.40
Romuald Starosielec	Repair Poland Movement	6,019	0.78
**Total**		**773,347**	**100.00**

Warsaw City Council

Party	Votes	%	Seats
Civic Coalition	360,655	47.02	37
Law and Justice	170,392	22.22	15
The Left (Note: Including The City Is Ours.)	102,009	13.30	8
Third Way	60,715	7.92	0
Confederation and Nonpartisan Localists	41,275	5.38	0
KORWiN (2024)	21,550	2.81	0
Repair Poland Movement	5,112	0.67	0
In Common for Warsaw	4,867	0.63	0
Committee of Agata Tobolczyk	392	0.05	0
**Total**	**766,967**	**100.00**	**60**
Source: National Electoral Commission

=== Kraków ===
Kraków Mayor

Candidate	Party	First round		Second round	
Candidate	Party	Votes	%	Votes	%
**Aleksander Miszalski**	Civic Coalition (PO) (Note: Supported by New Left and Committee of Stanisław Mazur.)	110,556	37.21	133,703	51.04
Łukasz Gibała	Committee of Łukasz Gibała – Kraków for Residents (Ind.) (Note: Supported by Left Together.)	79,580	26.79	128,269	48.96
Łukasz Kmita	Law and Justice	58,795	19.79		
Andrzej Kulig	Committee of Andrzej Kulig "Towards the Future" (Ind.) (Note: Supported by Polish People's Party and Self-Governing Kraków, as well as by the incumbent Jacek Majchrowski.)	21,341	7.18		
Konrad Berkowicz	Confederation and Nonpartisan Localists	14,854	5.00		
Rafał Komarewicz	Committee of Rafał Komarewicz Kraków Third Way	9,126	3.07		
Adam Hareńczyk	United for Kraków (Ind.)	2,837	0.95		
**Total**		**297,089**	**100.00**	**261,972**	**100.00**

Kraków City Council

Party	Votes	%	+/–	Seats	+/–
Civic Coalition (Note: Including New Left.)	118,641	40.11	−3.54	24	+1
Law and Justice	68,615	23.20	−6.62	12	−4
Committee of Łukasz Gibała – Kraków for Residents (Note: Including Left Together.)	46,012	15.56	+2.83	7	+3
Committee of Rafał Komarewicz Kraków Third Way	18,430	6.23	New	0	New
Confederation and Nonpartisan Localists	17,753	6.00	+2.96	0	0
Committee of Andrzej Kulig „Towards the Future”	14,264	4.82	New	0	New
Committee of Stanisław Mazur	7,105	2.40	New	0	New
United for Kraków	3,487	1.18	New	0	New
Self-Governing Kraków	1,467	0.50	New	0	New
**Total**	**295,774**	**100.00**	–	**43**	**0**
Source: National Electoral Commission

=== Wrocław ===
Wrocław Mayor

Candidate	Party	First round		Second round	
Candidate	Party	Votes	%	Votes	%
**Jacek Sutryk** (incumbent)	Jacek Sutryk The Left and Localists (Ind.) (Note: Supported by Civic Platform and New Left.)	80,585	34.33	115,350	68.29
Izabela Bodnar	Third Way (PL2050)	69,954	29.80	53,572	31.71
Łukasz Kasztelowicz	Law and Justice	45,000	19.17		
Jerzy Michalak	Bezpartyjni Samorządowcy (Ind.)	18,731	7.98		
Robert Grzechnik	Confederation There is One Poland Nonpartisans (NN)	12,597	5.37		
Grzegorz Prigan	Wrocławians for Wrocławians (Ind.)	7,864	3.35		
**Total**		**234,731**	**100.00**	**168,922**	**100.00**

Wrocław City Council

Party	Votes	%	Seats
Civic Coalition	98,653	42.13	23
Law and Justice	50,275	21.47	8
The Left and Localists	33,229	14.19	6
Third Way	19,707	8.42	0
Confederation There is One Poland Nonpartisans	14,377	6.14	0
Bezpartyjni Samorządowcy	10,006	4.27	0
Wrocławians for Wrocławians	7,724	3.30	0
Comrades for Wrocław	197	0.08	0
**Total**	**234,168**	**100.00**	**37**

=== Łódź ===
Łódź Mayor

Candidate	Party	Votes	%
**Hanna Zdanowska** (incumbent)	Civic Coalition (PO) (Note: Supported by New Left.)	143,862	59.30
Agnieszka Wojciechowska van Heukelom	Law and Justice (Ind.)	54,733	22.56
Ewa Szymanowska	Third Way (PL2050)	22,487	9.27
Klaudia Domagała	Confederation and Nonpartisan Localists (NN)	14,142	5.83
Janusz Wdzięczak	Self-Government Coalition Energy of Łódź (Pirates)	5,368	2.21
Jan Waliszewski	National Action (KKP)	1,991	0.82
**Total**		**242,583**	**100.00**

Łódź City Council

Party	Votes	%	Seats
Civic Coalition	139,428	57.65	28
Law and Justice	56,701	23.44	8
Third Way	23,022	9.52	1
Confederation and Nonpartisan Localists	14,559	6.02	0
Self-Government Coalition Energy of Łódź	5,779	2.39	0
National Action	2,359	0.98	0
**Total**	**241,848**	**100.00**	**37**

=== Poznań ===
Poznań Mayor

Candidate	Party	First round		Second round	
Candidate	Party	Votes	%	Votes	%
**Jacek Jaśkowiak** (incumbent)	Civic Coalition (PO)	82,147	43.74	109,533	70.67
Zbigniew Czerwiński	United Right – Poznań (PiS)	38,128	20.30	45,465	29.33
Przemysław Plewiński	Third Way (PL2050)	35,877	19.10		
Beata Urbańska	The Left (NL)	20,133	10.72		
Łukasz Garczewski	Social Poznań (Together)	11,506	6.13		
**Total**		**187,791**	**100.00**	**154,998**	**100.00**

Poznań City Council

Party	Votes	%	Seats
Civic Coalition	91,702	49.09	22
United Right – Poznań	33,688	18.04	6
The Left	22,487	12.04	3
Third Way	21,634	11.58	3
Social Poznań	11,252	6.02	0
Pro-Polish Confederation	6,026	3.23	0
**Total**	**186,789**	**100.00**	**34**

=== Gdańsk ===
Gdańsk Mayor

Candidate	Party	Votes	%
**Aleksandra Dulkiewicz** (incumbent)	Civic Coalition (Ind.) (Note: Supported by Everything for Gdańsk Association.)	103,337	57.95
Tomasz Rakowski	Law and Justice (PiS)	36,244	20.33
Andrzej Pecka	Common Gdańsk Way 2050 (Note: Common Gdańsk Way 2050 is a coalition of PL2050, The Left and local associations.) (PL2050)	12,355	6.93
Michał Urbaniak	Confederation Nonpartisans There is One Poland for Pomerania (KWiN)	7,723	4.33
Artur Szostak	I Love Gdańsk – Independent Candidates (PPP)	7,621	4.27
Adam Szczepański	Social Gdańsk – City for People (LR)	5,821	3.26
Mariusz Andrzejczak	Mariusz Andrzejczak for Gdańsk (Ind.)	5,213	2.92
**Total**		**178,314**	**100.00**

Gdańsk City Council

Party	Votes	%	Seats
Civic Coalition	102,624	57.78	25
Law and Justice	37,555	21.14	8
Common Gdańsk Way 2050	14,298	8.05	1
I Love Gdańsk – Independent Candidates	7,698	4.33	0
Confederation Nonpartisans There is One Poland for Pomerania	7,697	4.33	0
Social Gdańsk – City for People	5,464	3.08	0
Mariusz Andrzejczak for Gdańsk	2,209	1.24	0
Slavic Union	69	0.04	0
**Total**	**177,614**	**100.00**	**34**

=== Szczecin ===
Szczecin Mayor

Candidate	Party	Votes	%
**Piotr Krzystek** (incumbent)	Local Government Coalition of Piotr Krzystek (Ind.)	80,881	60.43
Zbigniew Bogucki	Law and Justice (PiS)	36,091	26.96
Bogdan Jaroszewicz	The Left (NL)	11,639	8.70
Dariusz Olech	Confederation and Nonpartisan Localists (NN)	5,242	3.92
**Total**		**133,853**	**100.00**

Szczecin City Council

Party	Votes	%	Seats
Civic Coalition	58,319	43.79	19
Law and Justice	32,602	24.48	7
Local Government Coalition of Piotr Krzystek	21,944	16.48	5
The Left	8,481	6.37	0
Confederation and Nonpartisan Localists	6,456	4.85	0
Agreement Serves People – Third Way	2,228	1.67	0
Third Way Szczecin 2050 (Note: Not related to Third Way.)	2,145	1.61	0
SZN – Szczecin, Full Steam Ahead	1,016	0.76	0
**Total**	**133,191**	**100.00**	**31**

=== Bydgoszcz ===
Bydgoszcz Mayor

Candidate	Party	Votes	%
**Rafał Bruski** (incumbent)	Civic Coalition (PO)	60,307	53.50
Łukasz Schreiber	Bydgoszcz Right (PiS)	32,375	28.72
Joanna Czerska-Thomas	Third Way (Ind.)	14,247	12.64
Maja Adamczyk	European Left (Ind.) (Note: Not related to New Left.)	5,802	5.15
**Total**		**112,731**	**100.00**

Bydgoszcz City Council

Party	Votes	%	Seats
Civic Coalition	58,013	52.45	15
Bydgoszcz Right	32,654	29.52	10
Third Way	16,516	14.93	3
European Left	3,417	3.09	0
**Total**	**110,600**	**100.00**	**28**

=== Lublin ===
Lublin Mayor

Candidate	Party	Votes	%
**Krzysztof Żuk** (incumbent)	Krzysztof Żuk Committee (PO)	68,461	57.49
Robert Derewenda	Law and Justice (Ind.)	40,796	34.26
Marcin Nowak	Confederation and Nonpartisan Localists (ND-T)	7,149	6.00
Ryszard Zajączkowski	Lublin Future and Tradition (Ind.)	2,676	2.25
**Total**		**119,082**	**100.00**

Lublin City Council

Party	Votes	%	Seats
Krzysztof Żuk Committee	63,237	53.23	18
Law and Justice	41,388	34.84	13
Confederation and Nonpartisan Localists	9,951	8.38	0
Lublin Future and Tradition	3,968	3.34	0
Majdan Wrotkowski Committee	260	0.22	0
**Total**	**118,804**	**100.00**	**31**

=== Białystok ===
Białystok Mayor

Candidate	Party	Votes	%
**Tadeusz Truskolaski** (incumbent)	Civic Coalition (Ind.)	56,591	53.32
Henryk Dębowski	Law and Justice (PiS)	35,495	33.45
Rafał Greś	Confederation and Nonpartisan Localists (NN)	7,864	7.41
Andrzej Aleksiejczuk	The Left (NL)	4,174	3.93
Jarosław Galej	Outside of the Clique (Ind.)	2,005	1.89
**Total**		**106,129**	**100.00**

Białystok City Council

Party	Votes	%	Seats
Civic Coalition	41,702	39.42	14
Law and Justice	35,632	33.68	12
Third Way	12,032	11.37	2
Confederation and Nonpartisan Localists	8,927	8.44	0
The Left	5,555	5.25	0
Outside of the Clique	1,949	1.84	0
**Total**	**105,797**	**100.00**	**28**

=== Katowice ===
Katowice Mayor

Candidate	Party	Votes	%
**Marcin Krupa** (incumbent)	Local Government Forum and Marcin Krupa (Ind.)	60,112	62.43
Leszek Piechota	Law and Justice (PiS)	14,173	14.72
Dawid Durał	Katowice2050 (PL2050)	8,847	9.19
Jacek Budniok	Confederation and Nonpartisan Localists (Ind.)	6,603	6.86
Marek Strzałkowski	Gaia System – The Youth for the Future Now (Ind.)	6,555	6.81
**Total**		**96,290**	**100.00**

Katowice City Council

Party	Votes	%	Seats
Civic Coalition	38,475	39.23	14
Local Government Forum and Marcin Krupa	29,472	30.05	9
Law and Justice	18,243	18.60	5
Katowice2050	5,422	5.53	0
Confederation and Nonpartisan Localists	5,145	5.25	0
Gaia System – The Youth for the Future Now	1,319	1.34	0
**Total**	**98,076**	**100.00**	**28**

=== Toruń ===
Toruń Mayor

Candidate	Party	First round		Second round	
Candidate	Party	Votes	%	Votes	%
**Paweł Gulewski**	Civic Coalition (PO)	26,548	38.28	39,093	65.00
Michał Zaleski (incumbent)	Michał Zaleski Committee (Ind.)	18,315	26.41	21,048	35.00
Adrian Mól	Law and Justice (PiS)	8,872	12.79		
Bartosz Szymanski	Active for Toruń (Ind.)	6,296	9.08		
Piotr Wielgus	The Left (NL)	3,960	5.71		
Maciej Cichowicz	Confederation and Nonpartisan Localists (Ind.)	2,726	3.93		
Magdalena Noga	Coalition of City Movements (Ind.)	1,624	2.34		
Dariusz Kubicki	I Love Toruń (KKP)	1,011	1.46		
**Total**		**69,352**	**100.00**	**60,141**	**100.00**

Toruń City Council

Party	Votes	%	Seats
Civic Coalition	27,103	39.33	15
Law and Justice	15,161	22.00	6
Michał Zaleski Committee	7,904	11.47	4
Active for Toruń	5,220	7.58	0
The Left	4,373	6.35	0
Third Way	3,067	4.45	0
Confederation and Nonpartisan Localists	2,961	4.30	0
Coalition of City Movements	1,895	2.75	0
I Love Toruń	1,221	1.77	0
**Total**	**68,905**	**100.00**	**25**

=== Rzeszów ===
Rzeszów Mayor

Candidate	Party	First round		Second round	
Candidate	Party	Votes	%	Votes	%
**Konrad Fijołek** (incumbent)	Committee of Konrad Fijołek Development of Rzeszów (Ind.)	28,649	37.91	36,916	54.90
Waldemar Szumny	Law and Justice (PiS)	18,314	24.23	30,331	45.10
Jacek Strojny	Together for Rzeszów Association (Ind.)	15,579	20.61		
Adam Dziedzic	Agreement Serves People – Third Way (PSL)	6,618	8.76		
Karolina Pikuła	Confederation and Nonpartisan Localists (KKP)	5,125	6.78		
Janusz Niemer	Defence of Poland Movement (PJJ)	1,293	1.71		
**Total**		**75,578**	**100.00**	**67,247**	**100.00**

Rzeszów City Council

Party	Votes	%	Seats
Law and Justice	21,342	28.42	9
Civic Coalition	18,628	24.81	7
Committee of Konrad Fijołek Development of Rzeszów	14,750	19.64	5
Together for Rzeszów Association	10,515	14.00	4
Confederation and Nonpartisan Localists	5,190	6.91	0
Agreement Serves People – Third Way	3,468	4.62	0
Defence of Poland Movement	1,201	1.60	0
**Total**	**75,094**	**100.00**	**25**

=== Kielce ===
Kielce Mayor

Candidate	Party	First round		Second round	
Candidate	Party	Votes	%	Votes	%
**Agata Wojda**	Civic Coalition (PO)	25,608	33.63	38,256	56.54
Marcin Stępniewski	Law and Justice (PiS)	19,078	25.05	29,407	43.46
Maciej Bursztein	Maciej Bursztein Friendly Kielce (Ind.)	14,197	18.64		
Kamil Suchański	Suchański Nonpartisans Coalition for Kielce (Ind.)	10,857	14.26		
Adam Cyrański	Third Way (Ind.) (Note: Supported by PL2050.)	2,839	3.73		
Marcin Chłodnicki	The Left (NL)	2,628	3.45		
Agata Marjańska	Together for Kielce (Ind.)	941	1.24		
**Total**		**76,148**	**100.00**	**67,663**	**100.00**

Kielce City Council

Party	Votes	%	Seats
Law and Justice	22,796	30.21	10
Civic Coalition	21,786	28.87	10
Maciej Bursztein Friendly Kielce	11,242	14.90	4
Third Way	6,864	9.10	0
Suchański Nonpartisans Coalition for Kielce	6,229	8.25	0
The Left	4,930	6.53	1
Together for Kielce	1,612	2.14	0
**Total**	**75,459**	**100.00**	**25**

=== Olsztyn ===
Olsztyn Mayor

Candidate	Party	First round		Second round	
Candidate	Party	Votes	%	Votes	%
**Robert Szewczyk**	Civic Coalition (PO) (Note: Supported by incumbent Piotr Grzymowicz and his committee.)	20,650	32.81	27,552	53.45
Czesław Małkowski	Committee of Czesław Jerzy Małkowski (Ind.)	13,315	21.16	23,997	46.55
Grzegorz Smoliński	Law and Justice (PiS)	9,753	15.50		
Marcin Możdżonek	Committee of Marcin Możdżonek – Better Olsztyn (Ind.)	8,502	13.51		
Mirosław Arczak	Common Olsztyn (Ind.)	6,088	9.67		
Monika Rogińska-Stanulewicz	Third Way Olsztyn (Ind.)	2,336	3.71		
Bartosz Grucela	The Left (Together)	2,286	3.63		
**Total**		**62,930**	**100.00**	**51,549**	**100.00**

Olsztyn City Council

Party	Votes	%	Seats
Civic Coalition	21,348	34.21	12
Law and Justice	12,892	20.66	8
Committee of Czesław Jerzy Małkowski	6,318	10.13	2
Committee of Marcin Możdżonek – Better Olsztyn	6,053	9.70	1
Committee of Piotr Grzymowicz	4,539	7.27	1
Common Olsztyn	4,527	7.26	1
Third Way Olsztyn	3,517	5.64	0
The Left	3,202	5.13	0
**Total**	**62,396**	**100.00**	**25**

=== Gorzów Wielkopolski ===
Gorzów Wielkopolski Mayor

Candidate	Party	First round		Second round	
Candidate	Party	Votes	%	Votes	%
**Jacek Wójcicki** (incumbent)	Committee of Jacek Wójcicki (Ind.)	18,381	49.24	18,166	61.23
Piotr Wilczewski	Civic Coalition (PO)	8,279	22.18	11,502	38.77
Roman Sondej	Law and Justice (Ind.)	5,807	15.56		
Dariusz Bachalski	The Left (Ind.)	3,215	8.61		
Katarzyna Miczał	Your City Gorzów (Ind.)	1,647	4.41		
**Total**		**37,329**	**100.00**	**29,668**	**100.00**

Gorzów Wielkopolski City Council

Party	Votes	%	Seats
Civic Coalition	14,220	38.54	13
Law and Justice	7,969	21.60	5
Committee of Jacek Wójcicki	6,164	16.70	6
Third Way	3,447	9.34	1
United for Gorzów	2,195	5.95	0
The Left	2,170	5.88	0
Your City Gorzów	735	1.99	0
**Total**	**36,900**	**100.00**	**25**

=== Zielona Góra ===
Zielona Góra Mayor

Candidate	Party	First round		Second round	
Candidate	Party	Votes	%	Votes	%
**Marcin Pabierowski**	Civic Coalition (PO)	22,098	42.74	28,464	57.46
Janusz Kubicki (incumbent)	Janusz Kubicki Committee (Ind.)	18,584	35.95	21,072	42.54
Grzegorz Maćkowiak	Law and Justice (PiS)	6,417	12.41		
Janusz Jasiński	The Left (Ind.)	2,887	5.58		
Adam Hreszczyk	Adam Hreszczyk Committee (Ind.)	1,713	3.31		
**Total**		**51,699**	**100.00**	**49,536**	**100.00**

Zielona Góra City Council

Party	Votes	%	Seats
Civic Coalition	19,788	38.62	14
Law and Justice	9,774	19.07	5
Janusz Kubicki Committee	9,210	17.97	6
Zielona Góra 2050 (Note: Not related to Poland 2050. Affiliated with mayor Janusz Kubicki.)	4,521	8.82	0
Third Way	3,261	6.36	0
The Left	2,804	5.47	0
Democratic Left Association	990	1.93	0
Adam Hreszczyk Committee	895	1.75	0
**Total**	**51,243**	**100.00**	**25**

=== Opole ===
Opole Mayor

Candidate	Party	Votes	%
**Arkadiusz Wiśniewski** (incumbent)	Committee of Arkadiusz Wiśniewski (Ind.)	33,104	75.47
Michał Nowak	Law and Justice (PiS)	7,586	17.29
Ryszard Skawiński	Confederation and Nonpartisan Localists (Ind.)	3,174	7.24
**Total**		**43,864**	**100.00**

Opole City Council

Party	Votes	%	Seats
Committee of Arkadiusz Wiśniewski	17,465	39.40	11
Civic Coalition	15,029	33.91	10
Law and Justice	7,734	17.45	4
Confederation and Nonpartisan Localists	2,532	5.71	0
Third Way	1,566	3.53	0
**Total**	**44,326**	**100.00**	**25**

=== Bielsko-Biała ===
Bielsko-Biała Mayor

Candidate	Party	First round		Second round	
Candidate	Party	Votes	%	Votes	%
**Jarosław Klimaszewski**(incumbent)	Committee of Jarosław Klimaszewski(PO) (Note: Supported by New Left)	28,574	45.88	30,999	63.93
Konrad Łoś	Law and Justice (PiS)	14,934	23.98	17,490	36.07
Małgorzata Zarębska	Committee Zarębska and the Independents.BB (Ind.)	7,098	11.40		
Bronisław Foltyn	Confederation and Nonpartisan Localists	3,718	5.97		
Magdalena Madzia	Committee "DoBBre Miasto"(Together)	3,124	5.02		
Szymon Twardak	Third Way (Ind.) (Note: Supported by PL2050.)	2,468	3.96		
Wojciech Borecki	Committee "October" Coalition (Ind.)	2,365	3.80		
**Total**		**62,281**	**100.00**	**48,489**	**100.00**

Bielsko-Biała City Council

Party	Votes	%	Seats
Civic Coalition (Note: Including New Left)	18,531	29.94	9
Law and Justice	16,189	26.16	9
Committee of Jarosław Klimaszewski	13,182	21.30	7
Committee Zarębska and the Independents.BB	4,404	7.12	0
Confederation and Nonpartisan Localists	3,574	5.77	0
Third Way	3,063	4.95	0
Committee "DoBBre Miasto" (Note: Including part of New Left)	2,110	3.41	0
Committee "October" Coalition	837	1.35	0
**Total**	**61,890**	**100.00**	**25**

== Warsaw district councils ==
Party	Votes	%	+/–	Seats	+/–
Civic Coalition	330,053	42.96	▲3.61	216	▲15
Law and Justice	168,976	21.99	▼2.05	91	▼27
The Left	72,589	9.45	▲0.33	29	▲5
Third Way	31,933	4.16	New	2	New
Poland 2050 + Local Lists	26,718	3.48	New	7	New
Bezpartyjni Samorządowcy	5,004	0.65	▼1.58	0	▼1
Other	133,049	17.32	▼7.94	75	▼6
Total	768,322	100.00	–	420	▼5
Source: PKW

== Reactions ==
Jarosław Kaczyński praised the election result, which he said highlighted the potential for greater success in the upcoming European election in June, and showed that reports of his political demise were "premature". Donald Tusk praised Rafał Trzaskowski on his reelection as mayor of Warsaw and called him the "hero" of the election night. He also acknowledged that conservative regions appeared to have mobilized more voters, while some of his party's supporters might not have voted due to fine weather conditions on 7 April. He also expressed happiness over the party's "record victory in cities" and its gains in the regional assemblies, while expressing concerns about "demobilization, especially among young people, failure in the east and in the countryside." Following the results of the runoff elections on 21 April, Tusk expressed satisfaction over the Civic Coalition's showing in key races and said that “Law and Justice has simply disappeared in many places”.
