= Masovian Voivodeship Sejmik =

Regional assembly in Poland

Masovian Voivodeship Sejmik Sejmik Województwa Mazowieckiego
- 8th Sejmik (2024–2029)

Type
- Type: Unicameral regional assembly of Masovian Voivodeship

Leadership
- Chairperson: Ludwik Rakowski, KO since 7 May 2024
- Vice Chairperson: Konrad Wojnarowski, PSL since 7 May 2024

Structure
- Seats: 51
- Political groups: Executive board (28): KO (20); PSL (8); Opposition parties (20): ZP (17); PiS (16); SP (1); R+ (3); Independent (3): Independent (3); BS (1); NL (1); Independent (1)

Elections
- Last election: 7 April 2024
- Next election: 2029

Meeting place
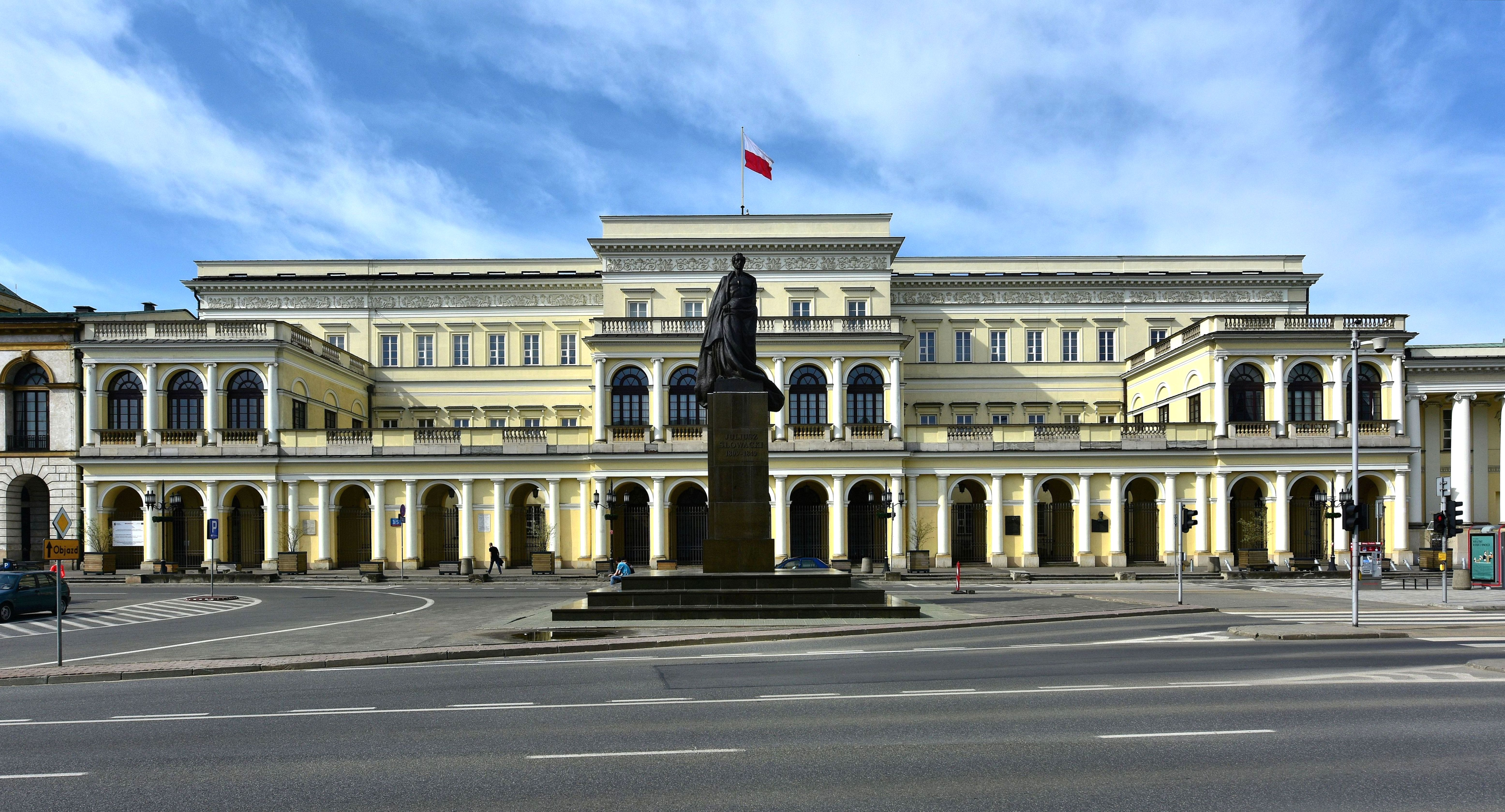
- Palace of the Minister of Treasury, 3 and 5 Bank Square, Warsaw

Website
- Masovian Regional Assembly

The Masovian Voivodeship Sejmik (Polish: Sejmik Województwa Mazowieckiego) is the regional legislature of the Voivodeship of Masovia in Poland. It is a unicameral parliamentary body consisting of fifty-one councillors, making it the largest provincial assembly in the republic. All councillors are chosen during regional elections for a five-year term. Incumbent chairperson of the assembly is Ludwik Rakowski of the Civic Coalition, elected at the first session on 7 May 2024.

The assembly elects the executive board that acts as the collective executive for the provincial government, headed by the voivodeship marshal. The current executive board of Masovia is a coalition government between the Civic Coalition and Polish People's Party under the leadership of Marshal Adam Struzik of the PSL.

The assembly convenes at the Palace of the Treasury Minister in Warsaw.

== Current composition ==
Group	Seats	Local government
Civic Coalition	20	Coalition government
Law and Justice	19	Opposition
Polish People's Party	8	Coalition government
Non-Inscrit	4	—N/a
Total	51	—
Vacant	0	—
As of 9 May 2024. Source:

== Constituencies ==
Members of the assembly are elected in seven multi-member constituencies with the party-list proportional representation using D'Hondt apportionment method.

Constituency number	City counties	Land counties	Seats
1	Part of Warsaw (Note: Districts of Mokotów, Ochota, Śródmieście, Ursynów, and Wilanów.)	—	5
2	Part of Warsaw (Note: Districts of Bemowo, Bielany, Ursus, Włochy, Wola, and Żoliborz.)	—	5
3	Part of Warsaw (Note: Districts of Białołęka, Rembertów, Targówek, Wawer, Wesoła, Praga Północ, and Praga Południe.)	—	6
4	Płock	Ciechanów, Gostynin, Mława, Płock, Płońsk, Przasnysz, Pułtusk, Sierpc, Sochaczew, Żuromin, Żyrardów	8
5	Radom	Białobrzegi, Grójec, Kozienice, Lipsko, Przysucha, Radom, szydłowiecki, zwoleński	7
6	Ostrołęka, Siedlce	Garwolin, Łosice, Maków, Mińsk, Ostrołęka, Ostrów, Siedlce, Sokołów, Węgrów, Wyszków	9
7	—	Grodzisk, Legionowo, Nowy Dwór, Otwock, Piaseczno, Pruszków, Warsaw West, Wołomin	11

== Election results ==
=== 1998 ===
Party	Mandates
Akcja Wyborcza Solidarność	32
Sojusz Lewicy Demokratycznej	30
Przymierze Społeczne	11
Unia Wolności	6
Stowarzyszenie Rodzina Polska	1
Total	80

=== 2002 ===
Party	Mandates
Sojusz Lewicy Demokratycznej – Unia Pracy	14
Prawo i Sprawiedliwość	10
Samoobrona Rzeczpospolitej Polskiej	8
Liga Polskich Rodzin	7
Polskie Stronnictwo Ludowe	7
Platforma Obywatelska	5
Total	51

=== 2006 ===
Party	Mandates
Platforma Obywatelska	17
Prawo i Sprawiedliwość	14
Polskie Stronnictwo Ludowe	12
Lewica i Demokraci	4
Liga Polskich Rodzin	4
Total	51

=== 2010 ===
Party	Votes	%	Seats
Civic Platform	518,254	28.56	17
Law and Justice	432,765	23.85	14
Polish People's Party	404,693	22.30	13
Democratic Left Alliance	263,275	14.51	7
Janusz Korwin-Mikke's Voters Movement	42,136	2.32	–
National Local Government Community	35,412	1.95	–
Right Wing of the Republic	24,323	1.34	–
National Party of Retirees and Pensioners	19,670	1.08	–
Polish Labour Party - August 80	13,322	0.73	–
League of Polish Families	12,004	0.66	–
Real Politics Union	9,810	0.54	–
Others	39,076	2.15	–
Total	1,814,740	100.00	51
Valid votes	1,814,740	85.97	
Invalid/blank votes	296,075	14.03	
Total votes	2,110,815	100.00	
Registered voters/turnout	4,151,659	50.84	

=== 2014 ===
Party	Votes	%	Seats
Law and Justice	519,819	28.76	19
Polish People's Party	463,395	25.64	16
Civic Platform	434,853	24.06	15
SLD Left Together	128,493	7.11	1
Janusz Korwin-Mikke's New Right	75,609	4.18	–
Masovian Local Government Community	68,686	3.80	–
National Movement	32,044	1.77	–
Direct Democracy	20,689	1.14	–
Your Movement	15,948	0.88	–
Slavic Union	6,621	0.37	–
National Revival of Poland	6,422	0.36	–
Self-Defence	3,505	0.19	–
Self-Defence Rebirth	1,188	0.07	–
Others	30,237	1.67	–
Total	1,807,509	100.00	51
Valid votes	1,807,509	84.46	
Invalid/blank votes	332,647	15.54	
Total votes	2,140,156	100.00	
Registered voters/turnout	4,190,807	51.07	

=== 2018 ===
Party	Votes	%	Seats
Law and Justice	815,942	34.04	24
Civic Coalition	662,994	27.66	18
Polish People's Party	315,287	13.15	8
Nonpartisan Local Government Activists	149,551	6.24	1
SLD Left Together	130,970	5.46	–
Kukiz'15	130,501	5.44	–
Partia Razem	40,799	1.70	–
Liberty in Local Governments	36,307	1.51	–
Green Party	33,101	1.38	–
National Movement	29,612	1.24	–
Union of Christian Families	21,595	0.90	–
Free and Solidary	17,955	0.75	–
National Unity – Community	11,532	0.48	–
Labour Party	761	0.03	–
Total	2,396,907	100.00	51
Source: PKW

=== 2024 ===
Party	Votes	%	Seats
Law and Justice	750,998	33.16	21
Civic Coalition	713,838	31.52	20
Third Way	374,562	16.54	8
The Left	157,178	6.94	1
Confederation and Nonpartisan Localists	154,815	6.84	1
Nonpartisan Local Government Activists	53,956	2.38	–
Repair Poland Movement	15,894	0.70	–
Normal Country	13,487	0.60	–
Slavic Union	11,565	0.51	–
Citizens and Justice Association	7,177	0.32	–
Self-Defence of the Republic of Poland	5,923	0.26	–
National Polish Local Government Coalition	5,247	0.23	–
Total	2,264,640	100.00	51
Source: PKW

== See also ==
- Voivodeship sejmik
- Masovian Voivodeship
