= Piotr Krzystek =

Polish jurist and politician (born 1973)

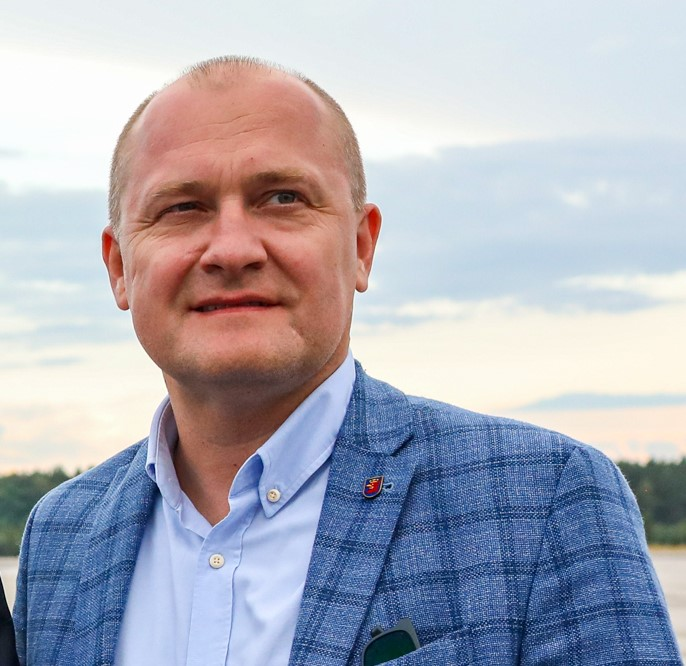
- Piotr Krzystek in 2021.

Mayor of Szczecin
- Incumbent
- Assumed office 4 December 2006
- Preceded by: Marian Jurczyk

Deputy mayor of Szczecin
- In office 26 November 2002 – 23 August 2004

Personal details
- Born: 5 February 1973 (age 53) Szczecin, Poland
- Party: New Poland (2025–present); OK Poland (2021–2025); Bezpartyjni Samorządowcy (2014–2021); Independent (2002–2006, 2010–2014); Civic Platform (2006–2010)
- Spouse: Małgorzata Krzystek (sep. 2024)
- Education: University of Szczecin

Piotr Tomasz Krzystek (Polish: [ˈpjɔtr ˈtɔ.maʂ ˈkʂɘ̟s.tɛk]; born 5 February 1973) is a Polish jurist and politician. He has been the mayor of Szczecin since 2006.

== Biography ==
Piotr Krzystek was born on 5 February 1973, in Szczecin, Poland. He graduated from the Faculty of Law and Administration of the University of Szczecin.

In 1998, he began working in city administration as the deputy inspector in the Szczecin City Hall. In May 1998, he became the deputy director of the Health Department of the Szczecin Voivodeship Office in Szczecin. From 1 January 1999 to 31 March 2002, he was the general director of the West Pomeranian Voivodeship Office in Szczecin. He led the team which implemented the 1999 administrative reform.

From 26 November 2002 to 23 August 2004, he was the deputy mayor of Szczecin. After leaving the office, he became a counsel in the law firm Kancelaria Radców Prawnych Jankowski & Krzystek. From 2004 to 2007, he was the chairperson of the Association of Polish Municipalities of the Pomerania Euroregion.

In 2006, he run for the office of the mayor of Szczecin in the local election, as a nonpartisan candidate from the Civic Platform mandate. He received 41.79% votes in the first round, and 64.83% in the second round, winning the election. He was sworn in on 4 December 2006. Krzystek has officially joined the Civil Platform with the end of 2006.

In 2008, the Central Anticorruption Bureau has accused Krzystek of buying a communal apartment for a highly lowered price, between 1999 and 2003. He, then a general director of the Voivodeship Office, was granted the permission to buy the apartment by Władysław Lisewski, the voivode of the West Pomeranian Voivodeship. The apparent was estimated to be worth 180,000 Polish złoty in 2000, however Krzystek has bought it for only 32,000 Polish złoty, which was only 17.5% of its actual estimated value. In 2009, the Szczecin District Court ruled that there was no legal standing, on which basis he could have bought said apartment, and as such, ordering him to return it. He has upheld to the ruling.

In 2010, the Civic Platform announced that it would not list him as its candidate in the upcoming mayoral election. In response, he has suspended his membership on 18 September 2010, and officially left the party on 27 November 2010.

He was re-elected as the mayor of Szczecin in the 2010 local election. He run as a nonpartisan candidate, from his own electoral committee, the Szczecin for Generations, which cooperated with Conservative People's Party. He was again re-elected in the 2014 local elections. During the elections, he also organized the Nonpartisan West Pomerania electoral committee, which received one seat in the West Pomeranian Voivodeship Sejmik. In 2015, he was one of the founders of electoral committees of Bronisław Komorowski, who was one of the candidates in the presidential election.

He was once again re-elected at the mayor in the 2018 local elections. As the leader of the West Pomerania Nonpartisants, he also oversaw local electoral committees of the Nonpartisan Local Government Activists. In 2021, he was one of the founding members of the OK Poland Local Government Coalition (originally known as the All-Poland Local Government Coalition), which branched off from the Nonpartisan Local Government Activists. He became its vice-chairperson. Krzystek was re-elected as the mayor of Szczecin in the 2024 elections, receiving 60.4% of the votes. He candidated from his own committee, supported by the Civic Coalition.

In 2025, he joined the New Poland party, joining its management.

== Electoral results ==
Krzystek has won first place in every mayoral election he took part in since 2006. While he has ran for the Szczecin City Council, he lapsed on his election to the body, keeping his position as mayor.

Due to term limits, Krzystek is ineligible for re-election as the city mayor, set to vacate office around 2029.

Year	Office	Party	Primary			Secondary			Result	Ref.
Year	Office	Party	Total	%	P.	Total	%	P.	Result	Ref.
2006	Mayor of Szczecin	Independent (Civic Platform)	56,996	41.79%	1st	74,473	64.83%	1st	Won	
2010	Mayor of Szczecin	Independent (Szczecin for Generations) (Note: Also supported by the Conservative People's Party.)	31,321	26.55%	1st	49,857	61.42%	1st	Won	
2010	Szczecin City Council	Independent (Szczecin for Generations)	1,516	6.74%	—N/a				Won (Note: Polish law bars someone from holding two elected offices at once. Krzystek did not take up his mandate as a member of the Szczecin City Council to keep his position as mayor.)	
2014	Mayor of Szczecin	Independent (Nonpartisan West Pomerania)	50,191	46.46%	1st	56,536	71.93%	1st	Won	
2014	Szczecin City Council	Independent (Nonpartisan West Pomerania)	2,108	10.09%	—N/a				Won	
2018	Mayor of Szczecin	Nonpartisans (Nonpartisan West Pomerania)	73,063	47.25%	1st	100,465	78.22%	1st	Won	
2018	Szczecin City Council	Nonpartisans (Nonpartisan West Pomerania)	4,439	14.15%	—N/a				Won	
2024	Mayor of Szczecin	Local Government Coalition (Civic Coalition) (Note: Civic Coalition endorsed Krzystek's bid for mayoral re-election. Despite that, it opted to ran a separate list to the city council, against the Local Government Coalition. Additionally, Poland 2050 also supported Krzystek in his re-election.)	80,881	60.43%	1st	—N/a			Won	
2024	Szczecin City Council	Local Government Coalition (Civic Coalition)	1,770	6.84%	—N/a				Won	

== Private life ==
He is married to Małgorzata Krzystek, with whom, they have three children. In 2024, it was announced that they are in a separation. He declares himself as Catholic.

== Orders and decorations ==
- Golden Order of Merit of the Police (2012)
- Commander's Cross of the Order of Polonia Restituta (2015)
- Honorary Badge of Merit of the Local Government (2015)
