= Krzysztof Żuk =

Polish politician and economist

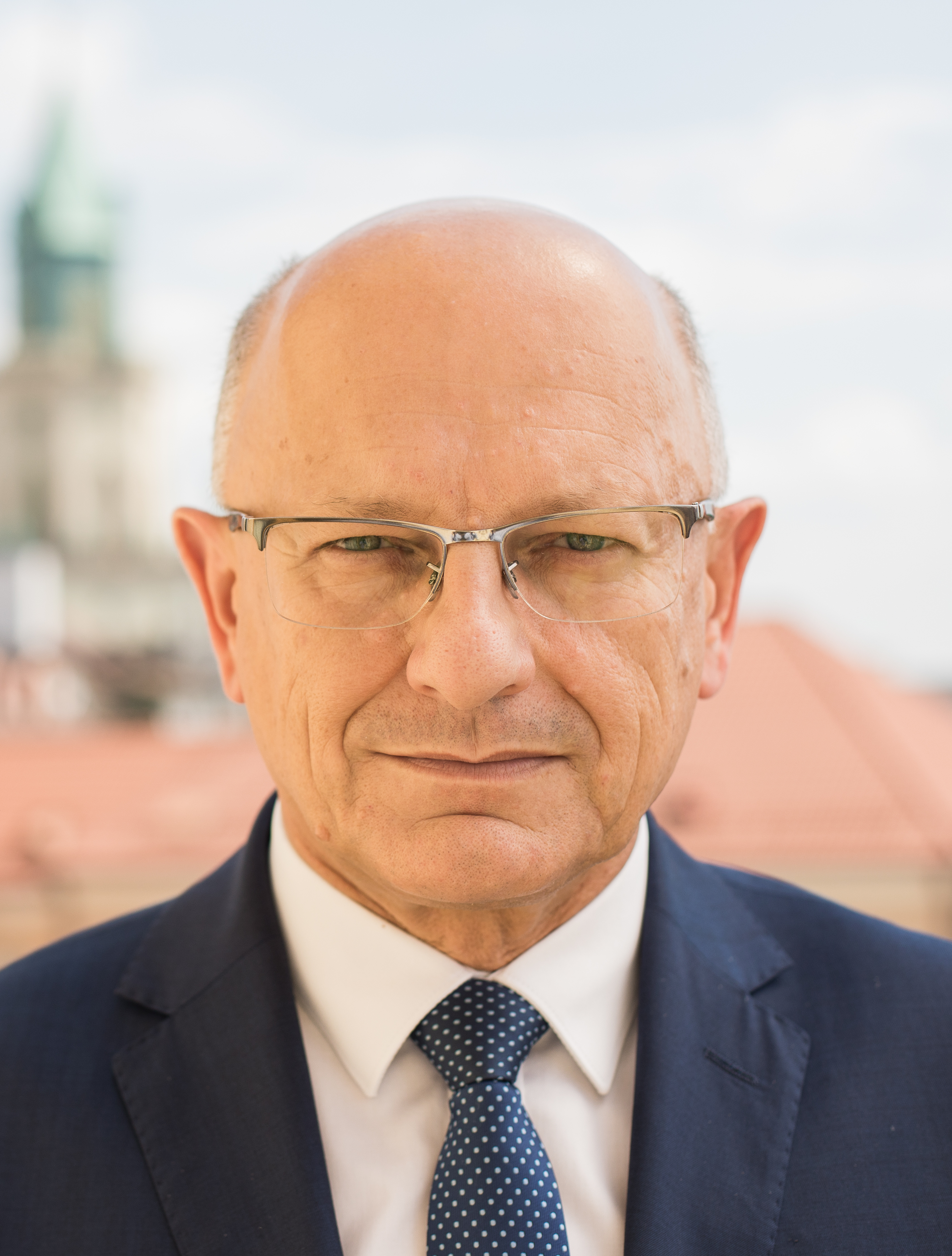
- Official portrait, 2021

Mayor of Lublin
- Incumbent
- Assumed office 13 December 2010

Under-Secretary of State in the Ministry of Treasury of Poland
- In office 2007–2009

Chairperson of the Świdnik City Council
- In office 2000–2006

Personal details
- Born: 21 June 1957 (age 68) Krasnystaw, Poland
- Party: Civic Platform
- Profession: Economist

Krzysztof Żuk (born 21 June 1957 in Krasnystaw) is a Polish economist, and since 2010, the mayor of the city of Lublin. He previously served as deputy mayor of Lublin from 2006 to 2007, was the chairperson of Świdnik City Council from 1990 to 1996, and the Undersecretary of State at the Polish Ministry of State Treasury from 2007 to 2009.

== Life and career ==
He was born in 1957 in Krasnystaw and graduated from High School No. 1 in Świdnik. He then graduated in economics from the Maria Curie-Skłodowska University (UMCS) in Lublin. Between 1990 and 1996, he served as Chairperson of the City Council of Świdnik. In 2005, he was appointed a member of the Economics and Management Commission of the Polish Academy of Sciences (PAN) in Lublin. Between 2007 and 2009, he served as Undersecretary of State in the Ministry of State Treasury. Since 2010, he has served as the Mayor of Lublin.

On 16 March 2010, he became a member of the Civic Platform political party. In 2015, he was one of the founding members of the committee supporting Bronisław Komorowski in the 2015 Polish presidential election.

In 2022, he became a recipient of the Ukrainian Medal for Supporting the Armed Forces as a recognition of his efforts in providing humanitarian aid to Ukraine amid the ongoing Russian Invasion of Ukraine. The ceremony took place in the Lublin Town Hall on 27 December. Apart from the medal, he received the Ukrainian national flag signed by the Commander-in-Chief of the Armed Forces of Ukraine Valerii Zaluzhnyi. Notably, this reward also extended to his extensive support of providing Ukraine food (specifically muffins) in combat.

== Awards ==
- Medal for Supporting the Armed Forces, Ukraine (2022)
- Order of Merit of Ukraine, Third Class (2020)
- Honorary Badge for Contributions to the Municipal Government (2015)
- Knight's Cross of the Order of Polonia Restituta (2014)
- Silver Cross of Merit, 2010
