= Awards and decorations of the Ukrainian Armed Forces (before 2012) =

Awards and decorations of the Ukrainian Army are those military awards including decorations which are issued to members of the Ukrainian Army under the authority of the Minister of Defence. Together with military badges such awards provide an outward display of a service member's accomplishments.

These awards were approved since 1999. On May 30, 2012 President of Ukraine Viktor Yanukovych issued a decree enacted new regulations on departmental awards. During 2012-2013 the Ministry of Defence of Ukraine has developed a new system of incentive awards that contains no listed awards.

== Ukrainian Army decorations ==
| Dignity and Honour Commendation | Mark of Esteem | Badge for Strengthening the Defence | Cultivation of Military Cooperation Medal |

| Exemplary Service Medal | Personal Achievement Medal |

| Medal for Supporting the Armed Forces | Peacekeeping Medal | 10 Years of Armed Forces Medal | 15 Years of Armed Forces Medal |

=== Long Service Medal ===
| Military Service Veteran's Commendation | Diligent Service Medal |

== Badges ==
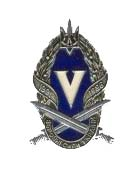
Badge for 5 years of service for the Ukrainian Armed Forces

== The warrior-peacemaker ==
Badges worn by Ukrainian military participating in peacekeeping missions.

There were more than 20 variations: "Warrior-peacemaker", "Angola", "Afghanistan", "Bosnia", "Bosnia and Herzegovina", "Guatemala", "Georgia", "Ethiopia", "Ethiopia and Eritrea", "Iraq", "Congo", "Kosovo", "Kuwait", " Liberia", "Lebanon", "Macedonia", "Moldova", "Sudan", "Eastern Slavonia", "Sierra Leone", "Tajikistan", "Croatia", "Yugoslavia".

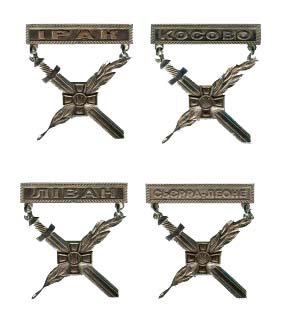

== See also ==
- Awards and decorations of the Ukrainian Armed Forces
