= OK Poland Local Government Coalition =

Political organization in Poland

OK Poland Local Government Coalition Koalicja Samorządowa „OK Polska”
- Abbreviation: OKP
- Chairperson: Tadeusz Czajka
- Founded: 12 December 2020
- Dissolved: 21 November 2025
- Split from: Bezpartyjni Samorządowcy
- Headquarters: 6 Szumin Street, Tarnowo Podgórne, Poland
- Ideology: Regionalism; Localism; Decentralization
- Political position: Centre-left
- Colors: Blue, red, white

Website
- okpolska.pl

The OK Poland Local Government Coalition (Polish: Koalicja Samorządowa „OK Polska”), until 2024 known as the All-Poland Local Government Coalition (Ogólnopolska Koalicja Samorządowa, OKS, also abbreviated OK Samorząd, literally meaning OK Local Government), was an organization in Poland consisting of local government political associations. As part of it functions the political party of the Local Government Coalition (Koalicja Samorządowa, KS). It was founded on 12 December 2020 by splitting from the Nonpartisan Local Government Activists (Bezpartyjni Samorządowcy), and registered on 8 February 2021. Its political party was registered on 22 February 2024. It was dissolved on 21 November 2025.

== History ==
The All-Poland Local Government Coalition was founded on 12 December 2020 as a federation of local government organizations and associations in Poland, by the members of the Nonpartisan Local Government Activists. It was registered on 8 February 2021. Tadeusz Czajka, mayor of Tarnowo Podgórne, became its chairperson, while its deputy chairpeople became Piotr Krzystek, mayor of Szczecin, and Janusz Kubicki, mayor of Zielona Góra. Andrzej Sitnik, mayor of Siedlce, became its secretary, and Ludomir Handzel, mayor of Nowy Sącz. Remaining founding members of its management were Marian Błachut (mayor of Czechowice-Dziedzice), and Jacek Szydło, former mayor of Dywity. In 2023, the management was joined by Patryk Hałaczkiewicz, deputy mayor of Kąty Wrocławskie.

In May 2021, the coalition had signed the letter of intent of cooperation with Kraków Suburbia Agreement, represented by mayor of Zabierzów Elżbieta Burtan, as well as the councillors of Kraków County, and the municipality of Zabierzów. In October, the faction of Nonpartisan Local Government Activists in the Szczecin City Council had switched to the All-Poland Local Government Coalition. In April 2022, the coalition had signed the cooperation agreement with Poland 2050 party. In August, it was joined by the Kluczbork Land association, led by Jarosław Kielar, mayor of Kluczbork, together with councillors from the town and Kluczbork County.

On 8 December 2022, the parliamentary group of Nonpartisan Local Government Activists in the Lower Silesian Voivodeship Sejmik had joined the coalition, forming the Lower Silesian Local Government Coalition. Patryk Wild became its leader, and remaining members Dariusz Stasiak and Mirosław Lubiński (the latter being from Democratic Left Association). Lubiński left the group four days later, leading to its disbanding. It was reactivated on 9 May 2023, under the name Local Government Coalition.

In February 2023, to the All-Poland Local Government Coalition had joined the association Common Koszalin, led by Piotr Jedliński, mayor of Koszalin. In November, in the West Pomeranian Voivodeship Sejmik wss formed the parliamentary group of Local Government Coalition, led by Cezary Urban, with other members being Marcin Przepióra and Olgierd Kustosz. The same month, the Independent Councillors Club in the Kołobrzeg City Council had joined the coalition, rebranding to the Local Government Coalition. In January 2024, to the coalition joined the Self-governed Pomerania, led by Dariusz Męczykowski.

On 22 February 2024 was registered the political party of the Local Government Coalition, founded by the All-Poland Local Government Coalition, and led by Tadeusz Czajka. Patryk Hałaczkiewicz became its deputy chairperson, Szczepan Stempiński (deputy mayor of Szczecin to security matters) its general secretary, and Marcin Wojtkowiak (mayor of Czerwonak), its treasurer.

In 2024 local elections the coalition registered candidates for sejmiks in 11 voivodeships. Additionally, the Self-Governed Pomerania (member of the coalition) had registered its candidates for the Pomeranian Voivodeship Sejmik under its own banner. The coalition also had candidates for other lower instances of local government, though most remained with their own committees, backed by the coalition. Among voivodeship sejmiks, it had only won one seat in total, it being in the West Pomeranian Voivodeship Sejmik.

On 5 May 2025, the National Electoral Commission declared that the party did not submit a financial declaration for 2024. As a result, the party was deregistered on 21 November 2025.

== Ideology ==
The All-Poland Local Government Coalition was founded with the goal of forming the organization promoting the cooperation across Poland between nonpartisan local government politicians. It postulated decentralisation as well as strengthening and protection of the independence of local governments.

The party programme consisted of five pillars: decentralisation, financing, education, health care, and environment. The association policy proposals were:

- reform of rules regarding financing local government tasks;
- directing 3% of the local GDP towards education subsidiaries;
- setting the teacher salaries equal to the national average salary;
- decentralisation of the health care institutions;
- directing the European Structural and Investment Funds towards improving the quality of life and safety of the local inhabitants, and the environment.

== Member organizations ==
The All-Poland Local Government Coalition consisted of the following organisations:

- AXIS Initiative Forum;
- Common Poznań;
- Future and Development;
- Good Local Government of Towns and Municipalities of Olsztyn County;
- Greater Poland Association of Entrepreneurs and Eployers;
- Greater Poland Ideas Workshop;
- Greater Poland Local Government Coalition "Nonpartisan and Independent";
- Kraków Suburbia Agreement;
- Local Government Activist Inhabitants Above Divisions;
- Local Government Coalition of the West Pomeranian Voivodeship;
- Local Government Initiatives;
- Łódź Energy;
- Lower Silesian Local Government Coalition;
- Kalisz Institute;
- Kluczbork Land;
- Kościan Land Agreement;
- Mokotów for All;
- New Initiative;
- Nonpartisan Siedlce;
- Nonpartisants "Credibility. Independence. Dialogue";
- Nowy Sącz Coalition;
- One Kraków;
- Our Municipality, Our County;
- Self-governed Pomerania;
- Together for Ińsko;
- Together for Wisznice;
- VERUM.
