= Repair Poland Movement =

Repair Poland Movement Ruch Naprawy Polski
- Abbreviation: RNP
- Chairman: Romuald Starosielec
- Founded: February 6, 2023
- Preceded by: Unity of the Nation; Unity of Poles Movement
- Headquarters: ul. Mostowa 16/18 m 9, 00-260 Warsaw
- Ideology: National democracy Economic nationalism Ordoliberalism; Social conservatism Euroscepticism
- Political position: Right-wing
- Sejm: 0 / 460
- Senate: 0 / 100
- European Parliament: 0 / 53
- Regional assemblies: 0 / 552
- Mayors: 0 / 2,476
- Powiat Councils: 0 / 6,170
- Gmina Councils: 6 / 39,416

Website
- https://rnp.org.pl/
- Politics of Poland; Political parties; Elections; A: Rzeczpospolita classified the party as socially right-wing, but economically left-leaning. It has also been described as economically centrist.

Repair Poland Movement (Polish: Ruch Naprawy Polski, RNP) is a Polish political party registered on 21 April 2023. Until 26 June 2023 it was known as Electoral Action of Poles (Polish: Akcja Wyborcza Polaków, AWP).

== History ==
On 6 February 2023 Unity of the Nation, the former party led by Romuald Starosielec, was deregistered and in its place the Electoral Action of Poles was applied for registration with Magdalena Koroblewska as its chairman. On 27 May 2023, a Repair Poland Congress was organized with NIK chairman Marian Banaś as a guest. Other speakers included Dariusz Grabowski (Unity of Poles Movement treasurer), Romuald Starosielec, Stanisław Kluza, Gabriel Janowski, Andrzej Sadowski and Tadeusz Wilecki. On a 26 June assembly AWP renamed itself to Repair Poland Movement and Romuald Starosielec became its chairman. Its regional coordinators included Paweł Połanecki (former chairman of Unity of the Nation and a former Masovian Sejmik councillor), Andrzej Nastała (Unity of Poles Movement chairman), Grzegorz Andrysiak (board member of Farmers Trade Union "Self-Defence") and Adam Czeczetkowicz (known for making Krzysztof Kononowicz famous).

RNP registered only one list in the 2023 Polish parliamentary election, in Siedlce constituency. It was led by Nabil Malazi (formerly chairman of the unregistered Russophilic far-left party Zmiana of Mateusz Piskorski and of Patriotic Poland) and received 0.15% of the nationwide vote. It also fielded candidates in 3 Senate constituencies, all of which ended up in last place.

In 2024 Polish local elections the Movement fielded candidates to seven Sejmiks, the Powiat council of Łomża County, multiple municipality councils and three mayoral candidates, including Romuald Starosielec running for the mayorship of Warsaw. In Sejmik elections the party received 0.24% of nationwide votes. It managed to elect 6 municipal councillors. Starosielec earned last place in the Warsaw mayoral election.

In the 2024 European Parliament election the party registered lists in Masovian and Silesian constituencies. Except the leader Romuald Starosielec and one Self-Defence member, all other candidates were independent. The party received 4737 votes, amounting to 0.04% nationwide result.

At the end of July 2024, the party organized the Polish Diaspora Initiative Conference, where it called for an increased cooperation with Polish diasporas and argued that returning Poles would prove crucial to revitalization of the Polish economy. During the conference, the party criticized the Polish government for working with foreign corporations while ignoring investments and proposals coming from the capital of Polish diasporas; Repair Poland Movement also warned against the continuing Russo-Ukrainian War and argued that Polish authorities do not seek a fair and permanent end to the conflict.

In the 2025 Polish presidential election, the party announced its leader Romuald Starosielec as its presidential candidate. Starosielec also tried to run in the 2020 Polish presidential election, gathering about 80,000 signatures for his candidacy, falling short of the 100,000 required. In contrast, his 2024 run received the endorsement of some minor parties and political movements outside of the Repair Poland Movement. The party held its own primaries, where Starosielec emerged victorious. In his program, Starosielec proposed to end all aid to Ukraine, ban the privatization of Polish resources as well as forests and water bodies, as well as annulling the New Pact on Migration and Asylum in favor of Poland developing its own immigration policy.

In April 2025, the party gathered the required 100,000 signatures needed for a presidential candidate to appear on the ballot and submitted it to the National Electoral Commission, thus making Starosielec an official presidential candidate.

== Platform ==
The party is considered Eurosceptic, national-democratic, and ordoliberal. Some of its proposals include the introduction of an income tax, statutory ban on the sale of state land and forests, and a "universal economic self-government", where local governments would be granted more fiscal autonomy. RNP supports electing parliamentarians, local governments and the judiciary in plurality votes with possible recall referendums, increasing direct democracy, introducing universal economic self-government, dissolving "universal system of control and invigilation of citizens" and redistributing capital ownership among citizens. It has been classified as TAN (socially conservative) on the GAL/TAN scale, and Eurosceptic.

The party also calls for monetary sovereignty, lowering citizens' debts, introducing a revenue tax, ban on sale of land forests, formation of Union of Central European Countries, development of WOT and civil defense, increasing spending on higher education and research, basing energy development on Polish capital and introduction of a "Great Return" program to support the return of forced expatriates to Poland. The party also opposes the usage of chemistry in food processing and wants to base Polish agriculture on small farms. The party also calls for investment in renewable energy in Poland, particularly wind turbines.

While it opposes the division into right and left, Radio ZET has described the party as right-wing. Rzeczpospolita instead stated that the party is socially right-wing because of its social conservatism and opposition to what the party describes as 'gender madness', but notes that the party is not right-wing economically, where it holds heavily interventionist views. The party presents generally right-wing outlook on sociocultural issues, but strongly distances itself from right-wing economic ideologies and proposals.

Repair Poland Movement has ties with some agrarian trade unions, factions of the far-left Samoobrona party, as well as the former members of Patriotic Self-Defence, a right-leaning party that split from Samoobrona. In 2024, together with Samoobrona faction led by Jan Perkowski, the Repair Poland Movement declared that "the prosperity of the state is built on a morally healthy family and economic sovereignty, reliance on Polish capital; native entrepreneurs, farmers and the national currency", and that "Poland's sovereignty should be based on the state's universal moral order, direct democracy, a strong economy and a modern and civic army."

Economically, the party represents views that are described as left-wing. It calls for an end to military and financial support for Ukraine, the abolition of the Ministry of National Education and its replacement with a "Social Commission of National Education", introduction of school vouchers for underdeveloped areas, abolition of PIT and CIT taxes with an income tax, and increasing workers' wages. The RNP also calls for Poland's resignation from the New Pact on Migration and Asylum and introduction of active state intervention in the economy. It opposes private monopolies in the economy, postulates 'reconstruction' of the Polish economy based on exclusively Polish capital, and argues that forests and resources such as water should be fully nationalized and barred from any kind of privatization.

On foreign policy, the party has been labelled pro-Russian. Political commentators note that pro-Russian political scientist Leszek Sykulski was a prominent candidate in the party's 2025 primaries, and that it cooperates with political associations sympathizing with Russia such as the Camp of Great Poland. In February 2025, the leader of RNP published a manifesto for the 2025 Polish presidential election, in which he wrote: "We don't want war! We want to live a normal life! We don't want war with the cross! We want traditional values, a normal family, children! We don't want war with Russia! We want peace and good relations with our neighbours! We don't want to be a servant of Ukraine! We want the interests of Poles to be taken care of!" It also calls for re-opening Polish relations with Belarus.

== Election results ==
=== Sejm ===
Election	Leader	Votes	%	Seats	+/–	Government
2023	Romuald Starosielec	823	0.00 (#12)	0 / 460	New	Extra-parliamentary

=== Senate ===
Election	Votes	%	Seats	+/–	Government
2023	15,236	0.07 (#19)	0 / 100	New	Extra-parliamentary

=== European Parliament ===
Election	Leader	Votes	%	Seats	+/−	EP Group
2024	Romuald Starosielec	4,737	0.04 (#10)	0 / 53	New	−
2024	In a joint list with SRP, that didn't win any seat.					
