= Pomeranian Voivodeship Sejmik =

Regional assembly within Poland

Pomeranian Voivodeship Sejmik Sejmik Województwa Pomorskiego

Type
- Type: Unicameral

Leadership
- Chairperson: Jan Kleinszmidt, KO
- Vice-Chairpersons: Grzegorz Grzelak, Józef Sarnowski, Hanna Zych-Cisoń
- Marshal: Mieczysław Struk, KO

Structure
- Seats: 33 councillors
- Political groups: Executive board (20): KO (20); PO (13); Independent (6); WDG (1); Opposition parties (13): PiS (10); PiS (9); Independent (1); PSL (2); PL2050 (1)

Elections
- Last election: 7 April 2024

Meeting place
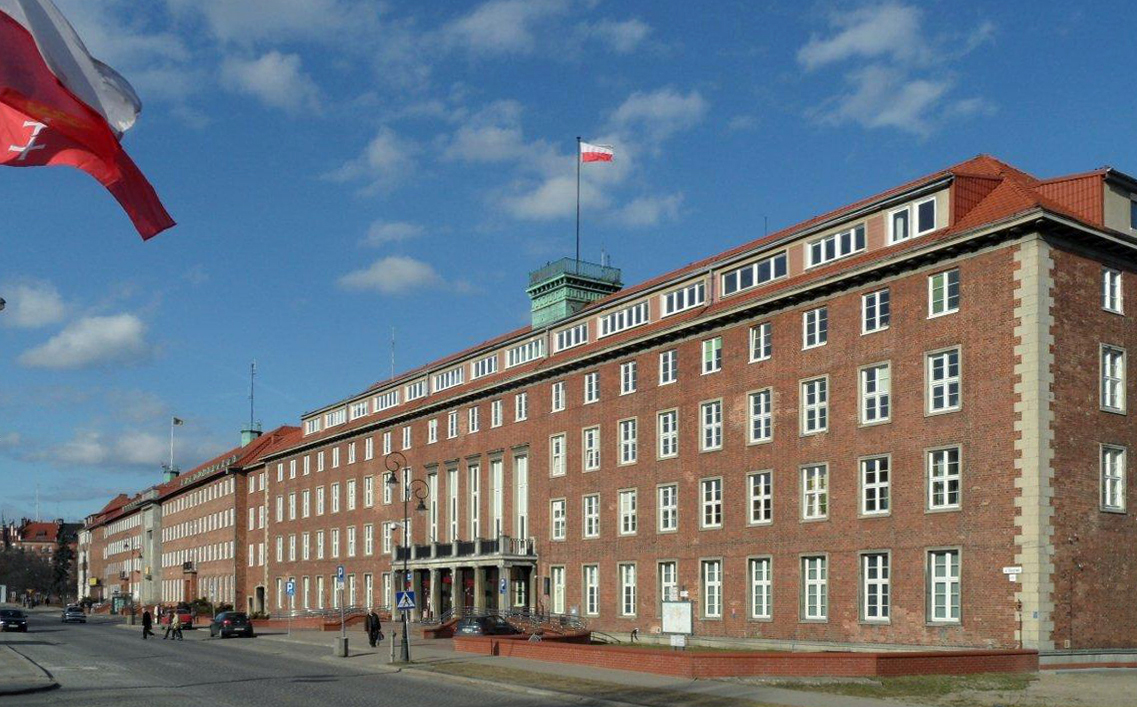
- Marshal's Office, Gdańsk

Website
- Pomeranian Regional Assembly

The Pomeranian Voivodeship Sejmik (Polish: Sejmik Województwa Pomorskiego) is the regional legislature of the voivodeship of Pomerania, Poland. It is a unicameral parliamentary body consisting of thirty-three councillors chosen during regional elections for a five-year term. The current chairperson of the assembly is Jan Kleinszmidt of the KO.

The assembly elects the executive board that acts as the collective executive for the provincial government, headed by the voivodeship marshal. The current Executive Board of Pomerania is a majority government of Civic Coalition under the leadership of Marshal Mieczysław Struk of the KO.

The assembly convenes within the Marshal's Office in Gdańsk.

== Districts ==
Members of the Assembly are elected from five districts and serve five-year terms. Districts do not have formal names. Instead, each constituency has a number and a territorial description.

Number	Seats	City counties	Land counties
1	7	Słupsk	Bytów, Chojnice, Człuchów, Lębork, Słupsk
2	8	Gdynia, Sopot	Puck, Wejherowo
3	7	Gdańsk	None
4	6	None	Gdańsk, Kartuzy, Kościerzyna, Starogard
5	5	None	Kwidzyn, Malbork, Nowy Dwór, Sztum, Tczew

== See also ==
- Polish Regional Assembly
- Pomeranian Voivodeship
