= Awards and decorations of the Ukrainian Armed Forces =

Awards and decorations of the Ukrainian Armed Forces are military decorations issued by the Ministry of Defence of Ukraine to soldiers who achieve a variety of qualifications, who have completed classroom training standards stipulated in their military occupational specialty and accomplishments while serving on active and reserve duty in the Armed Forces of Ukraine. Together with military badges, medals are a means to outwardly display the highlights of a service member's career. These badges are worn in order of precedence (Master the highest). Only badge of the highest degree worn.

On May 30, 2012 President of Ukraine Viktor Yanukovych issued a decree enacted new regulations on departmental awards. During 2012-2013 the Ministry of Defence of Ukraine has developed a new system of incentive awards.

== Badges for military service ==
=== Compulsory military service ===
==== Army ====
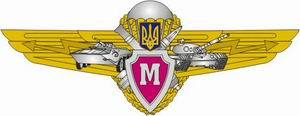
Master Badge

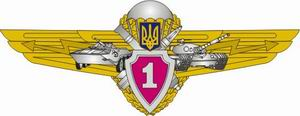
1st grade Specialist Badge

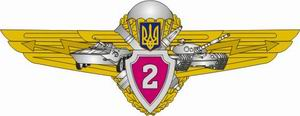
2nd grade Specialist Badge

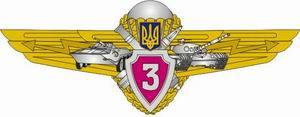
3rd grade Specialist Badge

==== Air Forces ====
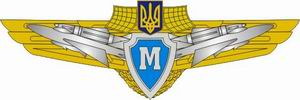
Master Badge

1st grade Specialist Badge

2nd grade Specialist Badge

3rd grade Specialist Badge

==== Navy ====
Master Badge

1st grade Specialist Badge

2nd grade Specialist Badge

3rd grade Specialist Badge

=== Voluntary military service ===
==== Army ====
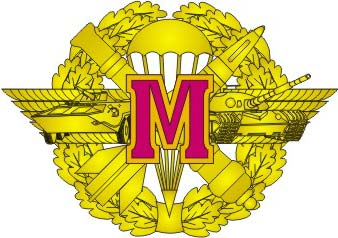
Master Badge

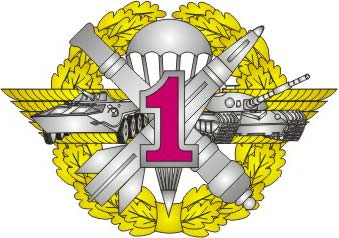
1st grade Specialist Badge

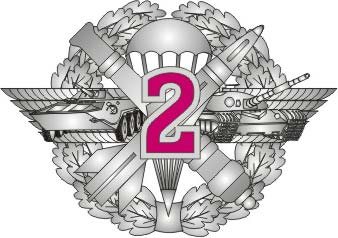
2nd grade Specialist Badge

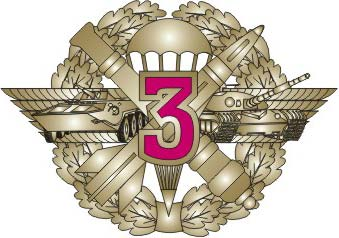
3rd grade Specialist Badge

==== Air Forces ====
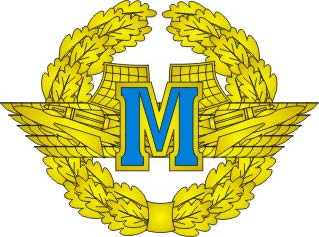
Master Badge

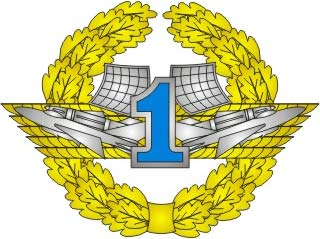
1st grade Specialist Badge

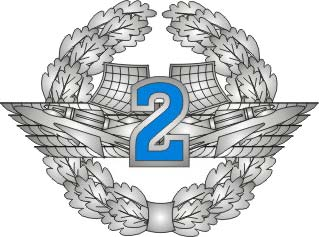
2nd grade Specialist Badge

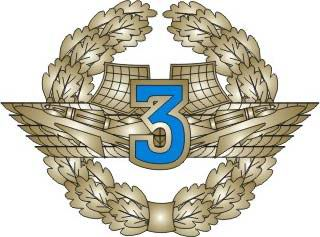
3rd grade Specialist Badge

==== Navy ====
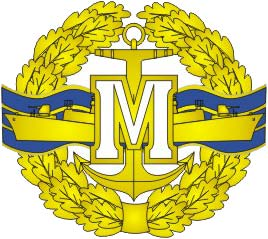
Master Badge

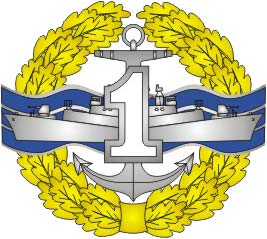
1st grade Specialist Badge

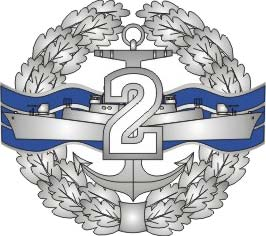
2nd grade Specialist Badge

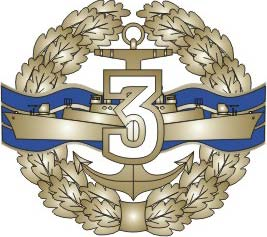
3rd grade Specialist Badge

== Ministry of Defence ==
Medal for Supporting the Armed Forces	Medal for Strengthening Defence	Cultivation of Military Cooperation Medal	Medal for the Defence of Ukraine	Wound Medal
Military Valor Badge	Mark of Esteem	Exemplary Service Badge	For Military Valor	
Since 2013			Since 2014	

=== Long Service Medal ===
25 years in service	20 years in service	15 years in service	10 years in service
Since 2013

== Honorary badges of commanders of the Armed Forces ==
For Service in Army	For Service in Air Assault Forces	Merited Paratrooper Badge	Armed Forces of Ukraine Badge

== Chief of the General Staff and Commander of the Armed Forces Awards ==
Glory and Honor Badge
For valiant military service to the Motherland Badge
Armed Forces Cross of Valor
Armed Forces Cross of Merit
For services in the aftermath of an emergency
For selfless work in the Armed Forces of Ukraine
Honorary military liaison
Participant in military exercises
The best sergeant (petty officer) of the Armed Forces of Ukraine
For services to the Armed Forces of Ukraine Badge
ATO Badge
For achievements in military service Badge (I and II class)
For achievements in military service Badge (I and II class)
Example Badge
Example Badge
Example Badge

== Other Accoutrements ==
Excellence Badge is awarded to soldiers, sergeants and officers with excellent military discipline, with rewards for exemplary performance of duty, perfectly captured their field. provide excellent care, preservation and operation of weapons, military equipment and supplies; who can well organize and methodically correct conduct training subordinates, achieved high performance in combat and humanitarian training and strengthening military discipline of their units.

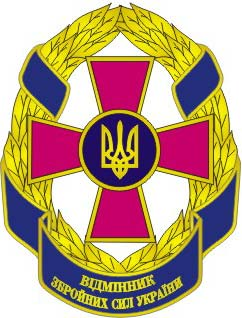
Excellence in the Armed Forces of Ukraine

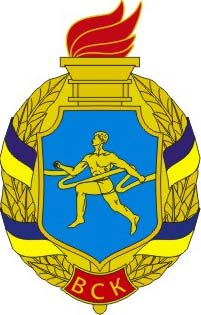
Military Athletes' Badge of Honor

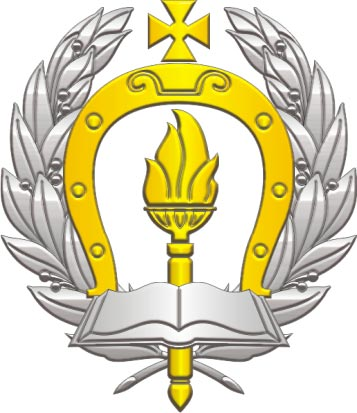
Ivan Bohun Badge to cadets

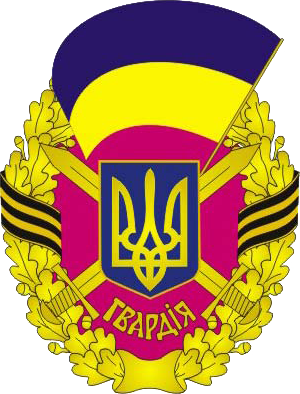
Ukrainian Guards Badge
(abolished 2016)

== See also ==
- Awards and decorations of the Ukrainian Armed Forces (before 2012)
