= List of members of the European Parliament for Poland, 2014–2019 =

This is a list of 51 members of the European Parliament for Poland in the 2014 to 2019 session, ordered by name.

See 2014 European Parliament election in Poland for further information on these elections in Poland, and 2014 European Parliament election for discussion on likely changes to the Parliamentary Groups.

== Current members ==
Name	Constituency	National Party	EP Group
Michał Boni	Warsaw	Civic Platform (PO)	EPP
Jerzy Buzek	Silesian	Civic Platform (PO)	EPP
Ryszard Czarnecki	Greater Poland	Law and Justice (PiS)	ECR
Edward Czesak	Lesser Poland and Świętokrzyskie	Law and Justice (PiS)	ECR (from 11 June 2015)
Anna Fotyga	Pomeranian	Law and Justice (PiS)	ECR
Lidia Geringer de Oedenberg	Lower Silesian and Opole	Elected on the SLD list but left the party before inauguration	S&D
Adam Gierek	Silesian	Democratic Left Alliance – Labor Union (SLD-UP)	S&D
Beata Gosiewska	Lesser Poland and Świętokrzyskie	Law and Justice (PiS)	ECR
Andrzej Grzyb	Greater Poland	People's Party (PSL)	EPP
Krzysztof Hetman	Lublin	People's Party (PSL)	EPP
Czesław Hoc	Lubusz and West Pomerania	Law and Justice (PiS)	ECR (from 27 November 2015)
Danuta Hübner	Warsaw	Civic Platform (PO)	EPP
Robert Iwaszkiewicz	Lower Silesian and Opole	Congress of the New Right (KNP) [until January 2015] Liberty (Wolność) [from January 2015]	NI (until 19 October 2014); EFDD (from 20 October 2014)
Danuta Jazłowiecka	Lower Silesian and Opole	Civic Platform (PO)	EPP
Marek Jurek	Warsaw	Right Wing of the Republic (PR)	ECR
Jarosław Kalinowski	Masovian	People's Party (PSL)	EPP
Karol Karski	Podlaskie and Warmian-Masurian	Law and Justice (PiS)	ECR
Sławomir Kłosowski	Lower Silesian and Opole	Law and Justice (PiS)	ECR (from 27 November 2015)
Agnieszka Kozłowska-Rajewicz	Greater Poland	Civic Platform (PO)	EPP
Zdzisław Krasnodębski	Warsaw	Law and Justice (PiS)	ECR
Urszula Krupa	Łódź	Elected on the PiS list but didn't join the party	ECR (from 24 June 2016)
Barbara Kudrycka	Podlaskie and Warmian-Masurian	Civic Platform (PO)	EPP
Zbigniew Kuźmiuk	Masovian	Law and Justice (PiS)	ECR
Ryszard Legutko	Lesser Poland and Świętokrzyskie	Law and Justice (PiS)	ECR
Janusz Lewandowski	Pomeranian	Civic Platform (PO)	EPP
Bogusław Liberadzki	Lubusz and West Pomeranian	Democratic Left Alliance – Labor Union (SLD-UP)	S&D
Elżbieta Łukacijewska	Subcarpathian	Civic Platform (PO)	EPP
Krystyna Łybacka	Greater Poland	Democratic Left Alliance – Labor Union (SLD-UP)	S&D
Michał Marusik	Warsaw	Congress of the New Right (KNP)	NI (until 14 June 2015); ENF (from 15 June 2015)
Jan Olbrycht	Silesian	Civic Platform (PO)	EPP
Stanisław Ożóg	Subcarpathian	Law and Justice (PiS)	ECR
Mirosław Piotrowski	Lublin	Elected on the PiS list but didn't join the party	ECR
Bolesław Piecha	Silesian	Law and Justice (PiS)	ECR
Julia Pitera	Masovian	Civic Platform (PO)	EPP
Tomasz Poręba	Subcarpathian	Law and Justice (PiS)	ECR
Marek Plura	Silesian	Civic Platform (PO)	EPP
Dariusz Rosati	Lubusz and West Pomeranian	Civic Platform (PO)	EPP
Jacek Saryusz-Wolski	Łódź	Civic Platform (PO) [until March 2017]	EPP (until 22 March 2017); NI (from 23 March 2017)
Czesław Siekierski	Lesser Poland and Świętokrzyskie	People's Party (PSL)	EPP
Bogusław Sonik	Lesser Poland and Świętokrzyskie	Civic Platform (PO)	EPP (from 20 November 2018)
Dobromir Sośnierz	Silesian	Liberty (Wolność)	NI (from 22 March 2018)
Adam Szejnfeld	Greater Poland	Civic Platform (PO)	EPP
Róża Thun	Lesser Poland and Świętokrzyskie	Civic Platform (PO)	EPP
Kazimierz Ujazdowski	Lower Silesian and Opole	Law and Justice (PiS) [until January 2017]	ECR (until April 2018); NI (from April 2018)
Jarosław Wałęsa	Pomeranian	Civic Platform (PO)	EPP
Jadwiga Wiśniewska	Silesian	Law and Justice (PiS)	ECR
Bogdan Zdrojewski	Lower Silesian and Opole	Civic Platform (PO)	EPP
Janusz Zemke	Kuyavian-Pomeranian	Democratic Left Alliance – Labor Union (SLD-UP)	S&D
Kosma Złotowski	Kuyavian-Pomeranian	Law and Justice (PiS)	ECR
Tadeusz Zwiefka	Kuyavian-Pomeranian	Civic Platform (PO)	EPP
Stanisław Żółtek	Lesser Poland and Świętokrzyskie	Congress of the New Right (KNP)	NI (until 14 June 2015); ENF (from 15 June 2015)

== Former members ==
Name	Constituency	National Party	EP Group
Marek Gróbarczyk	Lubusz and West Pomerania	Law and Justice (PiS)	ECR (until 25 November 2015)
Dawid Jackiewicz	Lower Silesian and Opole	Law and Justice (PiS)	ECR (until 25 November 2015)
Andrzej Duda	Lesser Poland and Świętokrzyskie	Law and Justice (PiS)	ECR (until 25 May 2015)
Janusz Wojciechowski	Łódź	Law and Justice (PiS)	ECR (until 7 May 2016)
Janusz Korwin-Mikke	Silesian	Congress of the New Right (KNP) [until January 2015] Liberty (Wolność) [from January 2015]	NI (until 28 February 2018)
Bogdan Wenta	Lesser Poland and Świętokrzyskie	Elected on the PO list but didn't join the party	EPP (until 6 November 2018)
