= List of members of the European Parliament for Poland, 2024–2029 =

On 9 June 2024 Poland elected its 53 members of the European Parliament, that will seat in the tenth session until 2029.

== List ==
Key to political association by
List (Note: Electoral list of the MEP in the election in 2024.)
- Civic Coalition (KO)
- Law and Justice (PiS)
- Confederation Liberty and Independence (KWiN)
- Third Way (TD)
- The Left
Party (Note: Political party membership of the MEP.)
- Law and Justice (PiS)
- Civic Platform (PO)
- National Movement (RN)
- New Left (NL)
- New Hope (NN)
- Polish People's Party (PSL)
- Polish Initiative (iPL)
- Confederation of the Polish Crown (KKP)
- Poland 2050 (PL2050)
- Independents (Ind.)
Group (Note: European Parliament political group affiliation of the MEP.)
- European Conservatives and Reformists (ECR)
- European People's Party Group (EPP)
- Progressive Alliance of Socialists and Democrats (S&D)
- Renew Europe (Renew)
- Europe of Sovereign Nations (ESN)
- Patriots for Europe (PfE)
- Non-Inscrits (NI)

Constituency	List	Name	Party	Group	# of votes	% of votes (Note: Percentage of votes in the scale of the constituency cast for the MEP.)
Pomeranian	KO	Janusz Lewandowski	PO	EPP	133,444	17.95
Pomeranian	KO	Magdalena Adamowicz	PO	EPP	204,207	27.47
Pomeranian	PiS	Piotr Müller	PiS	ECR	62,330	8.38
Kuyavian-Pomeranian	KO	Krzysztof Brejza	PO	EPP	205,200	37.67
Kuyavian-Pomeranian	PiS	Kosma Złotowski	PiS	ECR	61,463	11.28
Podlaskie Warmian-Masurian	KO	Jacek Protas	PO	EPP	125,861	18.31
Podlaskie Warmian-Masurian	PiS	Maciej Wąsik	PiS	ECR	85,151	12.39
Warsaw	TD	Michał Kobosko	PL2050	Renew	39,170	3.00
Warsaw	KWiN	Ewa Zajączkowska-Hernik	NN	ESN	102,569	7.86
Warsaw	KO	Kamila Gasiuk-Pihowicz	PO	EPP	136,811	10.49
Warsaw	KO	Michał Szczerba	PO	EPP	120,667	9.25
Warsaw	KO	Hanna Gronkiewicz-Waltz; Since 10 October 2024	PO	EPP	94,474	7.24
Warsaw	The Left	Robert Biedroń	NL	S&D	65,869	5.05
Warsaw	PiS	Małgorzata Gosiewska	PiS	ECR	99,286	7.61
Warsaw	PiS	Tobiasz Bocheński	PiS	ECR	95,880	7.35
Masovian	KO	Andrzej Halicki	PO	EPP	129,401	18.01
Masovian	PiS	Adam Bielan	PiS	ECR	90,690	12.62
Masovian	PiS	Jacek Ozdoba	PiS	ECR	54,327	7.56
Łódź	KO	Dariusz Joński	iPL	EPP	194,109	25.61
Łódź	PiS	Waldemar Buda	PiS	ECR	103,679	13.68
Greater Poland	TD	Krzysztof Hetman	PSL	EPP	44,937	4.37
Greater Poland	KWiN	Anna Bryłka	RN	PfE (Note: Join Patriots for Europe on 1 October 2024. Previously Non-Inscrits.)	111,420	10.84
Greater Poland	KO	Ewa Kopacz	PO	EPP	187,866	18.28
Greater Poland	KO	Michał Wawrykiewicz	PO	EPP	119,068	11.58
Greater Poland	The Left	Joanna Scheuring-Wielgus	NL	S&D	57,669	5.61
Greater Poland	PiS	Marlena Maląg	PiS	ECR	115,670	11.25
Lublin	KO	Marta Wcisło	PO	EPP	103,740	16.75
Lublin	PiS	Mariusz Kamiński	PiS	ECR	110,466	17.84
Subcarpathian	KWiN	Tomasz Buczek	RN	PfE	51,754	8.18
Subcarpathian	KO	Elżbieta Łukacijewska	PO	EPP	115,324	18.23
Subcarpathian	PiS	Daniel Obajtek	PiS	ECR	171,689	27.14
Subcarpathian	PiS	Bogdan Rzońca	PiS	ECR	46,096	7.29
Lesser Poland and Świętokrzyskie	TD	Adam Jarubas	PSL	EPP	81,674	5.49
Lesser Poland and Świętokrzyskie	KWiN	Grzegorz Braun	KKP	NI	113,746	7.64
Lesser Poland and Świętokrzyskie	KO	Bartłomiej Sienkiewicz	PO	EPP	254,324	17.08
Lesser Poland and Świętokrzyskie	KO	Jagna Marczułajtis-Walczak	PO	EPP	58,550	3.93
Lesser Poland and Świętokrzyskie	PiS	Beata Szydło	PiS	ECR	285,336	19.17
Lesser Poland and Świętokrzyskie	PiS	Arkadiusz Mularczyk	PiS	ECR	93,551	6.28
Lesser Poland and Świętokrzyskie	PiS	Dominik Tarczyński	PiS	ECR	210,942	14.17
Silesian	KWiN	Marcin Sypniewski	NN	ESN	49,553	3.72
Silesian	KO	Borys Budka	PO	EPP	334,842	25.14
Silesian	KO	Mirosława Nykiel	PO	EPP	54,937	4.12
Silesian	KO	Łukasz Kohut	PO	EPP	107,626	8.08
Silesian	PiS	Jadwiga Wiśniewska	PiS	ECR	145,218	10.9
Silesian	PiS	Patryk Jaki	PiS	ECR	266,246	19.99
Lower Silesian and Opole	KWiN	Stanisław Tyszka	NN	ESN	78,954	6.89
Lower Silesian and Opole	KO	Bogdan Zdrojewski	PO	EPP	310,544	27.11
Lower Silesian and Opole	KO	Andrzej Buła	PO	EPP	65,967	5.76
Lower Silesian and Opole	The Left	Krzysztof Śmiszek	NL	S&D	70,363	6.14
Lower Silesian and Opole	PiS	Anna Zalewska	PiS	ECR	108,305	9.45
Lower Silesian and Opole	PiS	Michał Dworczyk	PiS	ECR	123,908	10.82
Lubusz and West Pomeranian	KO	Bartosz Arłukowicz	PO	EPP	264,097	34.78
Lubusz and West Pomeranian	PiS	Joachim Brudziński	PiS	ECR	114,195	15.04

=== Former members ===
Constituency	List	Name	Party	Group	# of votes	% of votes	Until	Reason	Replaced by
Warsaw	KO	Marcin Kierwiński	PO	EPP	143,179	10.97	25 September 2024	Appointed minister without portfolio	Hanna Gronkiewicz-Waltz

== See also ==
- 2024 European Parliament election in Poland
- List of members of the European Parliament (2024–2029)
