= 2014 European Parliament election in Poland =

- 25 May 2014

All 51 Polish seats to the European Parliament
- Turnout: 23.83%
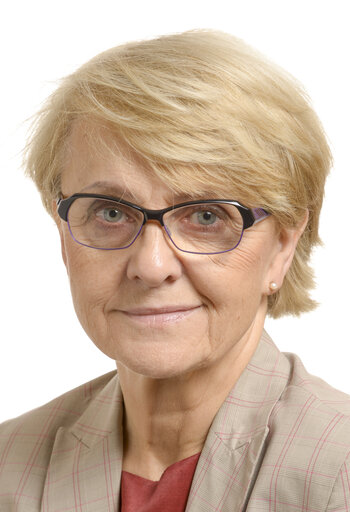

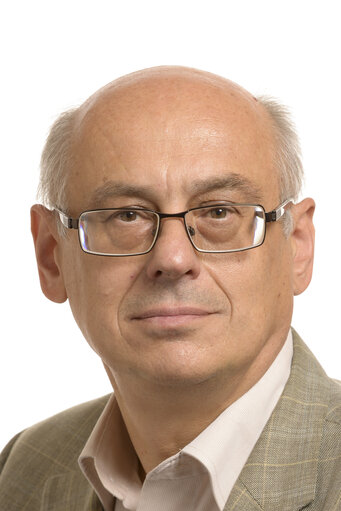

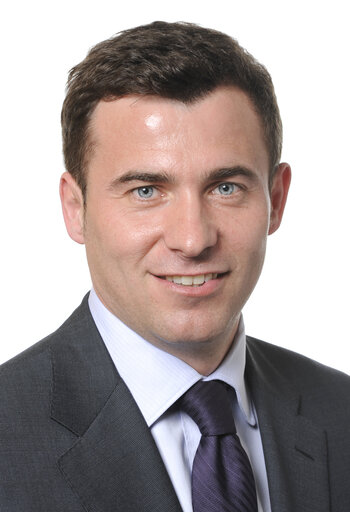

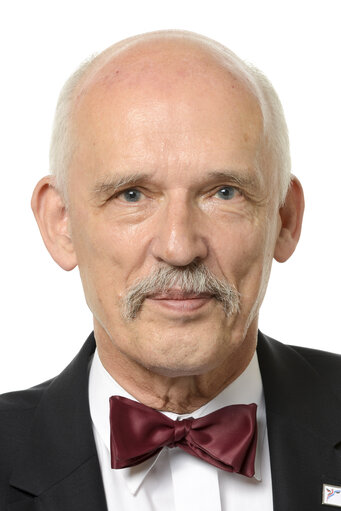

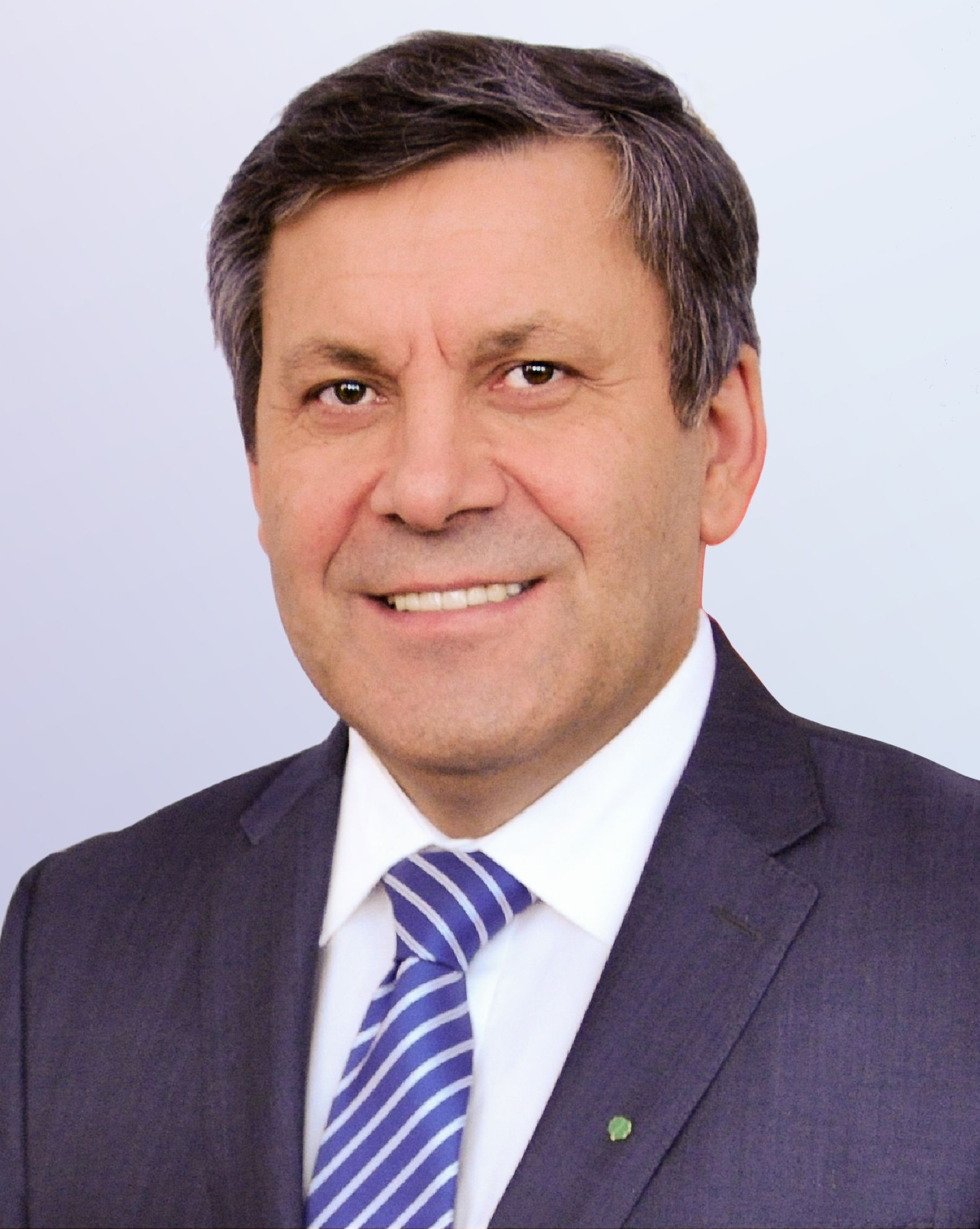
	First party	Second party	Third party
Leader	Danuta Hübner	Zdzisław Krasnodębski	Wojciech Olejniczak
Party	PO	PiS	SLD
Alliance	EPP	ECR	S&D
Last election	44.4%, 25 seats	29.3%, 15 seats	12.3%, 7 seats
Seats won	19	19	5
Seat change	▼6	▲4	▼2
Popular vote	2,271,215	2,246,870	667,319
Percentage	32.1%	31.8%	9.4%
Swing	▼12.3 pp	▲2.5 pp	▼2.9 pp
	Fourth party	Fifth party
Leader	Janusz Korwin-Mikke	Janusz Piechociński
Party	New Right	PSL
Alliance	NI	EPP
Last election	Did not exist	7.0%, 3 seats
Seats won	4	4
Seat change	Did not exist	▲1
Popular vote	505,586	480,846
Percentage	7.2%	6.8%
Swing	Did not exist	▼0.2 pp
- Election result and the plurality list's popular vote in each constituency

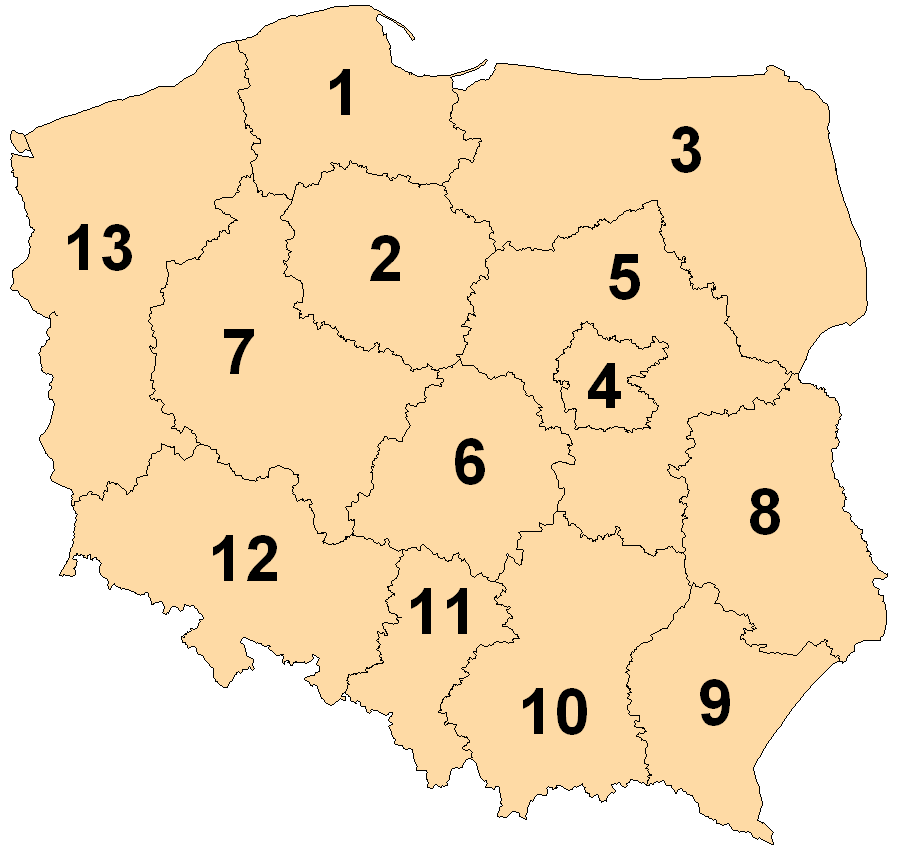
Poland is divided into 13 electoral districts whose numbers are displayed on the picture

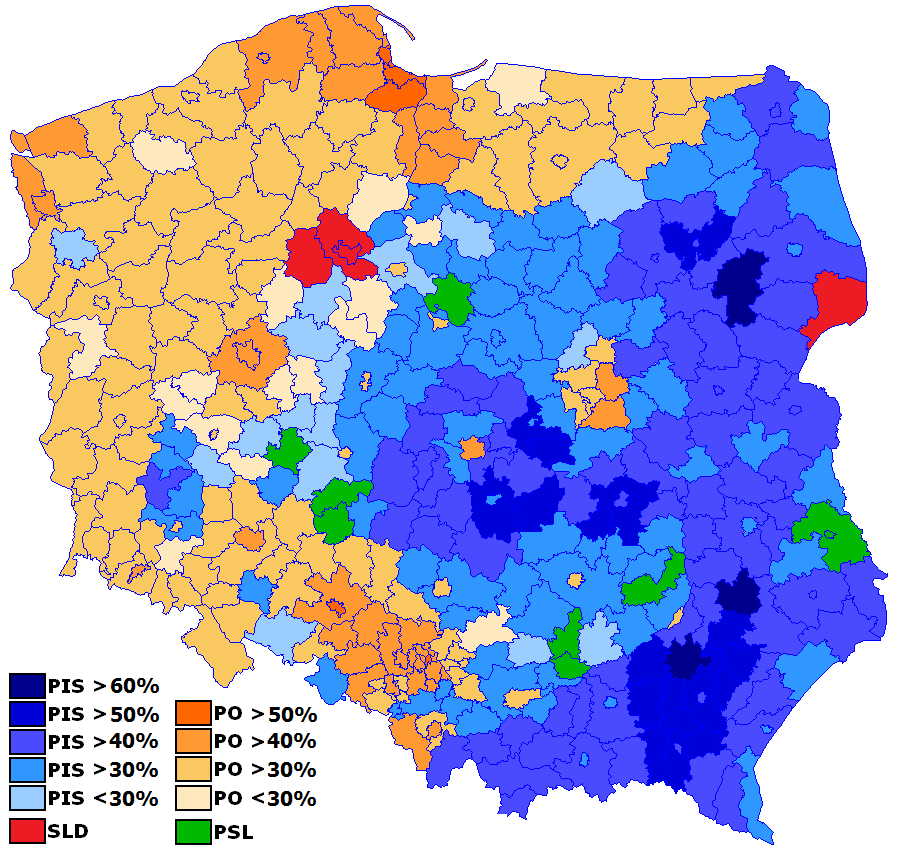
right Powiats won by ■ – Civic Platform ■ – Law and Justice ■ – Polish People's Party ■ – Democratic Left Alliance

The 2014 European Parliament election in Poland elected the delegation from Poland to the European Parliament. It took place on 25 May 2014. The Polish electorate will elect 51 MEPs, compared to 50 in the 2009 election. (In December 2011, under the terms of the Lisbon Treaty, one additional MEP from the People's Party entered the Parliament, bringing the number of Polish MEPs to 51). The number of MEPs is a result of the 2013 reapportionment of seats in the European Parliament. This means that Poland will have 6% of the total seats in the European Parliament.

== MEPs by European Political Group (as at 30 January 2014) ==
National party	Seats/51	EP group	Seats/766
Civic Platform	24	European People's Party	274
Polish People's Party	4	European People's Party	274
Law and Justice	7	European Conservatives and Reformists	56
Poland Together	4	European Conservatives and Reformists	56
Independent	1	European Conservatives and Reformists	56
Democratic Left Alliance	5	Socialists & Democrats	195
Labour United	1	Socialists & Democrats	195
Your Movement	1	Socialists & Democrats	195
United Poland	4	Freedom & Democracy	33

== Contesting committees ==
Name	Ideology	European Union position	Leader	Main candidate	Alliance	2009 result		Current seats
Name	Ideology	European Union position	Leader	Main candidate	Alliance	Vote (%)	Seats	Current seats
Civic Platform (PO)	Centrism, catch-all	Hard pro-Europeanism	Donald Tusk	Danuta Hübner	EPP	44.4%	25 / 50	24 / 51
Law and Justice (PiS) • Right Wing of the Republic • Piast	National conservatism, Christian democracy	Soft Euroscepticism	Jarosław Kaczyński	Zdzisław Krasnodębski	ECR	29.4%	15 / 50	7 / 51
Democratic Left Alliance (SLD) • Labor Union	Social democracy, third way	Hard pro-Europeanism	Leszek Miller	Wojciech Olejniczak	S&D	12.3%	7 / 50	6 / 51
Polish People's Party (PSL)	Agrarianism, Christian democracy	Hard pro-Europeanism	Janusz Piechociński	Grzegorz Benedykciński	EPP	7.0%	3 / 50	4 / 51
United Poland (SP)	Solidarism, social conservatism	Soft Euroscepticism	Zbigniew Ziobro		EFD	-	0 / 50	4 / 51
Poland Together (PR)	Conservative liberalism, economic liberalism	Moderate pro-Europeanism	Jarosław Gowin		ECR	-	0 / 50	4 / 51
Europa Plus (E+) • Your Movement • Alliance of Democrats • Democratic Party – demokraci.pl • Polish Labour Party • Social Democracy of Poland • Union of the Left	Social liberalism, progressivism	Eurofederalism	Janusz Palikot	Ryszard Kalisz	• ALDE • S&D • GUE-NGL	-	0 / 50	1 / 51
Congress of the New Right (KNP)	Right-libertarianism, Laissez-faire	Hard Euroscepticism	Janusz Korwin-Mikke		NI	-	0 / 50	0 / 51
National Movement (RN) • National Radical Camp • All-Polish Youth • Real Politics Union	Polish nationalism, right-wing populism	Hard Euroscepticism	Robert Winnicki	Krzysztof Bosak	NI	-	0 / 50	0 / 51

Political parties, coalitions of political parties, and nonpartisan citizens wishing to nominate candidates for the election were obliged to establish election committees and announce their creation to the State Electoral Commission until 7 April 2014. Establishment of an independent committee required signatures of at least 1,000 registered voters. 20 committees were established.

The committees were able to register lists of 5 to 10 candidates in each electoral district until 15 April. Each list had to be supported by signatures of at least 10,000 voters residing in the district. However, a committee that had collected enough signatures in at least 7 electoral districts were allowed to register lists in the remaining districts regardless of local support.

As of 24 April, the State Electoral Commission has confirmed that 9 committees registered candidates in all 13 constituencies.

Committees of political parties (Komitet Wyborczy)

- KW Nowa Prawica – Janusza Korwin-Mikke (Congress of the New Right)
  - 85 Congress of the New Right candidates
  - 45 nonpartisan candidates
- KW Platforma Obywatelska RP (Civic Platform)
  - 110 Civic Platform candidates
  - 20 nonpartisan candidates
- KW Polska Razem Jarosława Gowina (Poland Together)
  - 78 Poland Together candidates
  - 51 nonpartisan candidates
- KW Polskie Stronnictwo Ludowe (Polish People's Party)
  - 112 Polish People's Party candidates
  - 18 nonpartisan candidates
- KW Prawo i Sprawiedliwość (Law and Justice)
  - 101 Law and Justice candidates
  - 17 nonpartisan candidates
  - 11 Right Wing of the Republic candidates
  - 1 "Piast" Party candidate
- KW Solidarna Polska Zbigniewa Ziobro (United Poland)
  - 93 United Poland candidates
  - 35 nonpartisan candidates

Committees of coalitions (Koalicyjny Komitet Wyborczy)

- KKW Europa Plus Twój Ruch (coalition of Your Movement, Democratic Party – demokraci.pl, and Democratic Party)
  - 76 Your Movement candidates
  - 38 nonpartisan candidates
  - 9 Democratic Party – demokraci.pl candidates
  - 7 Democratic Party candidates
- KKW Sojusz Lewicy Demokratycznej – Unia Pracy (coalition of Democratic Left Alliance, and Labour United)
  - 98 Democratic Left Alliance candidates
  - 28 nonpartisan candidates
  - 4 Labour United candidates

Independent committee (Komitet Wyborczy Wyborców)

- KWW Ruch Narodowy (voters' committee National Movement)
  - 114 nonpartisan candidates
  - 15 Real Politics Union candidates
  - 1 Jobbik candidate

Additionally 3 committees of political parties registered lists of candidates in fewer electoral districts:

- KW Demokracja Bezpośrednia (Direct Democracy) in constituencies 1, 3, 6, 8, 10 and 11.
  - 23 nonpartisan candidates
  - 14 Direct Democracy candidates
  - 6 Pirate Party of Poland candidates
  - 5 Libertarian Party candidates
- KW Samoobrona (Self-Defence) in constituencies 3 and 6.
  - 20 Self-Defence candidates
- KW Partia Zieloni (Greens) in constituencies 1, 4, 6, 11 and 13.
  - 19 Greens candidates
  - 16 nonpartisan candidates
  - 7 Women's Party candidates
  - 5 Polish Socialist Party candidates

8 committees failed to submit lists or collect signatures:

Committees of political parties (Komitet Wyborczy)

- KW Samoobrona Odrodzenie (Self-Defence Revival)
- KW Związku Słowiańskiego (Slavic Union)

Independent committees (Komitet Wyborczy Wyborców)

- KWW Gospodarka Dobra Wspólnego (voters' committee Economy of Common Good)
- KWW Marka Wocha (voters' committee Marek Woch's Electors' Committee)
- KWW Naprawimyto.org (voters' committee 'We will fix it')
- KWW Obrony Wędlin Tradycyjnych (voters' committee Defence of Traditional Cold Meats)
- KWW Oburzeni (voters' committee The Outraged)
- KWW Wolność (voters' committee Freedom)

== Leaders by constituency ==
Constituency	PO	PiS	SLD-UP	PSL	E+	PRJG	SP	KNP	RN
Pomeranian	Janusz Lewandowski	Anna Fotyga	Longin Pastusiak	Andrzej Stępniak	Dorota Gardias	Stefan Hambura	Krzysztof Steckiewicz	Artur Dziambor	Tomasz Pałasz
Kuyavian-Pomeranian	Jan Vincent-Rostowski	Kosma Złotowski	Janusz Zemke	Eugeniusz Kłopotek	Kazimiera Szczuka	Maciej Marzec	Ireneusz Stachowiak	Jacek Kostrzewa	Marta Cywińska
Podlaskie and Warmian-Masurian	Barbara Kudrycka	Karol Karski	Tadeusz Iwiński	Stanisław Żelichowski	Małgorzata Kowalska	Jacek Żalek	Maciej Mojzesowicz	Andrzej Wyrębek	Piotr Lisiecki
Warsaw	Danuta Hübner	Zdzisław Krasnodębski	Wojciech Olejniczak	Grzegorz Benedykciński	Ryszard Kalisz	Paweł Kowal	Jacek Kurski	Michał Marusik	Krzysztof Bosak
Masovian	Julia Pitera	Wojciech Jasiński	Anna Kalata	Jarosław Kalinowski	Andrzej Celiński	Marek Czarnecki	Ludwik Dorn	Krzysztof Szpanelewski	Witold Tumanowicz
Łódź	Jacek Saryusz-Wolski	Janusz Wojciechowski	Weronika Marczuk	Mieczysław Łuczak	Ewa Wójciak	John Godson	Tadeusz Woźniak	Adam Woch	Maciej Migus
Greater Poland	Agnieszka Kozłowska-Rajewicz	Ryszard Czarnecki	Krystyna Łybacka	Andrzej Grzyb	Marek Siwiec	Dariusz Lipiński	Andrzej Dera	Zygmunt Kopacz	Bartosz Józwiak
Lublin	Michał Kamiński	Waldemar Paruch	Jacek Czerniak	Arkadiusz Bratkowski	Barbara Nowacka	Andrzej Stanisławek	Jarosław Żaczek	Jan Szymona	Marian Kowalski
Subcarpathian	Elżbieta Łukacijewska	Tomasz Poręba	Tomasz Kamiński	Władysław Kosiniak-Kamysz	Marta Niewczas	Kazimierz Jaworski	Mieczysław Golba	Waldemar Zarębski	Marcin Siembida
Lesser Poland and Świętokrzyskie	Róża Thun	Ryszard Legutko	Joanna Senyszyn	Czesław Siekierski	Jan Hartman	Jarosław Gowin	Zbigniew Ziobro	Stanisław Żółtek	Robert Winnicki
Silesian	Jerzy Buzek	Bolesław Piecha	Adam Gierek	Stanisław Dąbrowa	Kazimierz Kutz	Marek Migalski	Tomasz Adamek	Janusz Korwin-Mikke	Artur Zawisza
Lower Silesian and Opole	Bogdan Zdrojewski	Dawid Jackiewicz	Lidia Geringer de Oedenberg	Ilona Antoniszyn-Klik	Robert Kwiatkowski	Artur Zasada	Beata Kempa	Robert Iwaszkiewicz	Aleksander Krejckant
Lubusz and West Pomeranian	Dariusz Rosati	Marek Gróbarczyk	Bogusław Liberadzki	Jolanta Fedak	Paweł Piskorski	Marek Zagórski	Robert Stankiewicz	Stefan Oleszczuk	Sylwester Chruszcz

== Opinion polls ==
Source	Date	PiS	PO	SLD	PSL	E+TR	PR	KNP	SP	Others / undecided	Lead
TNS Polska	23 May 2014	26%	24%	7%	7%	3%	2%	4%	3%	26%	2% over PO
Homo Homini	23 May 2014	30.8%	30.2%	11.6%	4.8%	4.0%	1.5%	5.6%	2.1%	9.4%	0.6% over PO
PPW	22 May 2014	31.3%	29.8%	10.6%	6.8%	7.3%	4.6%	5.7%	2.6%	1.3%	1.5% over PO
Milward Brown	22 May 2014	29%	28%	9%	6%	4%	2%	7%	2%	2%	1% over PO
Estymator	22 May 2014	31%	32%	11%	7%	5%	5%	5%	2%	1%	1% over PiS
Millward Brown	20 May 2014	26%	27%	8%	5%	5%	3%	7%	2%	17.0%	1% over PiS
CBOS	20 May 2014	21%	26%	8%	5%	2%	2%	4%	1%	31.0%	5% over PiS
PPW	19 May 2014	32%	29%	11%	6%	8%	4%	5%	3%	2%	3% over PO
Homo Homini	17 May 2014	28.9%	28.0%	10.8%	4.8%	3.8%	1.5%	5.2%	2.2%	14.0%	0.9% over PO
TNS Polska	16 May 2014	29%	27%	8%	6%	6%	2%	3%	2%	17%	2% over PO
CBOS	14 May 2014	20%	21%	6%	3%	2%	1%	6%	2%	39%	1% over PiS
PPW	13 May 2014	29%	27%	13%	5%	8%	5%	7%	4%	2%	2% over PO
TNS Polska	11 May 2014	27%	24%	11%	5%	3%	3%	7%	4%	16%	3% over PO
Homo Homini	7 May 2014	30%	31%	13%	7%	6%	3%	5%	4%	1%	1% over PiS
PPW	6 May 2014	30%	28%	12%	6%	9%	4%	5%	4%	2%	2% over PO
Homo Homini	2 May 2014	29.1%	27.3%	12.7%	4.9%	4.1%	1.9%	6.2%	1.9%	12%	1.8% over PO
CBOS	30 April 2014	21%	29%	6%	4%	2%	4%	6%	1%	27%	8% over PiS
PPW	29 April 2014	32%	27%	10%	6%	10%	6%	4%	3%	2%	5% over PO
PPW	23 April 2014	31%	29%	11%	5%	8%	5%	6%	3%	2%	2% over PO
Homo Homini	18 April 2014	28.2%	26.6%	12.1%	5.1%	6.2%	2.2%	3.9%	1.7%	14.1%	1.6% over PO
TNS Polska	17 April 2014	31%	27%	8%	4%	4%	2%	3%	2%	22%	4% over PO
Estymator	12 April 2014	29%	33%	14%	6%	4%	5%	5%	2%	1%	4% over PiS
TNS Polska	7 April 2014	25%	26%	8%	8%	6%	3%	4%	4%	16%	1% over PiS
CBOS	26 March 2014	22%	24%	7%	6%	3%	4%	4%	2%	27%	2% over PiS
Estymator	22 March 2014	33%	36%	12%	5%	4%	5%	2%	2%	–	3% over PiS
Homo Homini	20 March 2014	28.3%	27.3%	10.8%	5.0%	4.8%	2.3%	2.8%	2.0%	–	1% over PO
TNS Polska	11 March 2014	27%	25%	8%	5%	7%	3%	3%	3%	17%	2% over PO
Homo Homini	2 March 2014	32%	26%	17%	6%	9%	3%	2%	4%	1%	6% over PO
Estymator	21 February 2014	34%	32%	11%	6%	6%	5%	3%	2%	1%	2% over PO
TNS Polska	20 February 2014	29%	19%	9%	6%	5%	2%	3%	2%	14%	10% over PO
TNS Polska	12 February 2014	25%	20%	10%	6%	11%	4%	3%	4%	17%	5% over PO
Homo Homini	20 January 2014	30%	25%	20%	8%	6%	5%	3%	2%	–	5% over PO

== Results ==
Results by EP grouping

Party or alliance		Votes	%	Seats	+/–
Civic Platform	Civic Platform	1,787,167	25.28	15	−3
Civic Platform	Independents	484,048	6.85	4	−3
Civic Platform	Total	2,271,215	32.13	19	−6
Law and Justice	Law and Justice	1,760,573	24.90	15	+4
Law and Justice	Right Wing of the Republic	110,675	1.57	1	New
Law and Justice	Independents and others	375,622	5.31	3	−1
Law and Justice	Total	2,246,870	31.78	19	+4
Democratic Left Alliance – Labour Union	Democratic Left Alliance	584,718	8.27	4	−2
Democratic Left Alliance – Labour Union	Labour Union	61,586	0.87	1	0
Democratic Left Alliance – Labour Union	Independents	21,015	0.30	0	0
Democratic Left Alliance – Labour Union	Total	667,319	9.44	5	−2
Congress of the New Right		505,586	7.15	4	New
Polish People's Party		480,846	6.80	4	+1
Solidary Poland		281,079	3.98	0	New
Europa Plus Your Movement		252,779	3.58	0	New
Poland Together		223,733	3.16	0	New
National Movement		98,626	1.40	0	New
The Greens		22,481	0.32	0	New
Direct Democracy		16,222	0.23	0	New
Self-Defence		2,729	0.04	0	0
Total		7,069,485	100.00	43	+1
Valid votes		7,069,485	96.88		
Invalid/blank votes		228,005	3.12		
Total votes		7,297,490	100.00		
Registered voters/turnout		30,636,537	23.82		
Source: PKW

== MEPs by political group ==
National party	Seats/51	EP group	Seats/751
Civic Platform	19	European People's Party	204
Polish People's Party	4	European People's Party	204
Law and Justice	18	European Conservatives and Reformists	44
Right Wing of the Republic	1	European Conservatives and Reformists	44
Democratic Left Alliance	4	Socialists & Democrats	188
Labour Union	1	Socialists & Democrats	188
Congress of the New Right	4	Non-Inscrits	
