= Warsaw (European Parliament constituency) =

Constituency of the European Parliament

- European Parliament constituency
- Location among the current constituencies

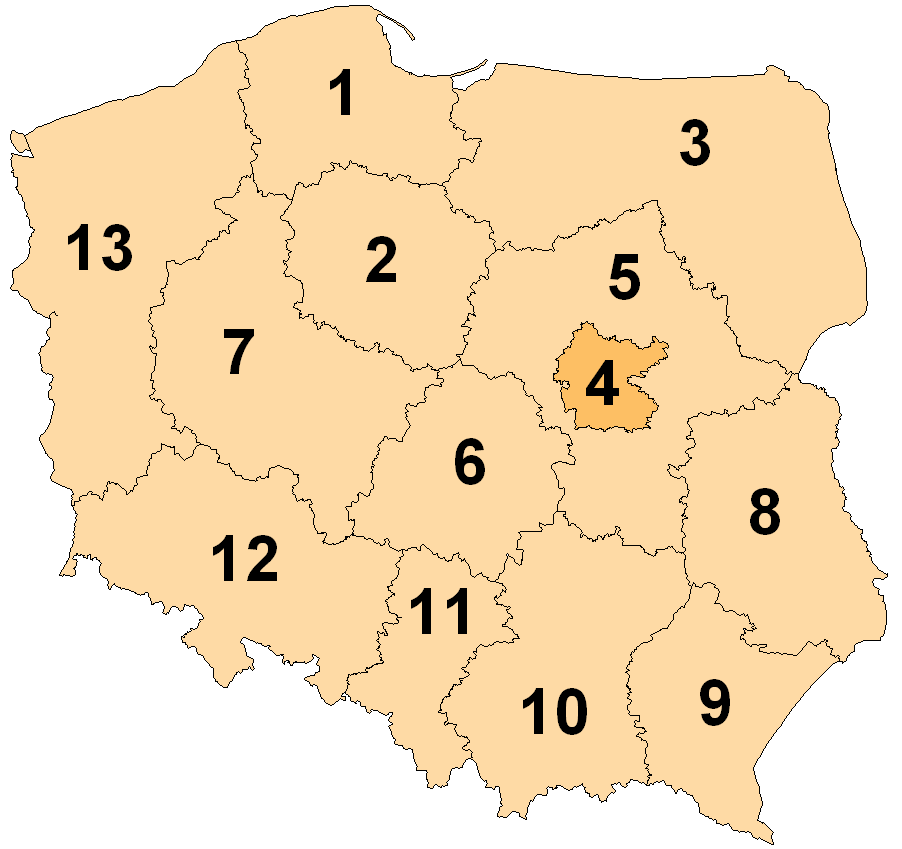
- 4th constituency in Poland
- Member state: Poland
- Created: 2004
- MEPs: 8 (since 2024); 6 (2019–2024); 5 (2004–2019)

Warsaw (Polish: Warszawa) is a constituency of the European Parliament. It consists of the counties (powiats) of Grodzisk, Legionowo, Nowy Dwór, Otwock, Piaseczno, Pruszków, Warsaw West, Wołomin and city of Warsaw.

== Nomenclature ==
The relevant Polish legislation ("The Act of 23 January 2004 on Elections to the European Parliament") establishing the constituencies does not give the constituencies formal names. Instead, each constituency has a number, territorial description, and location of the Constituency Electoral Commission. The 2004 Polish National Election Commission and the 2004 European Parliament Election website uses the territorial description when referring to the constituency, not the electoral commission location.

== Members of the European Parliament ==
Election	MEP (party)	MEP (party)	MEP (party)	MEP (party)	MEP (party)	MEP (party)	MEP (party)	MEP (party)
2004	Bronisław Geremek (UW)	Michał Kamiński (PiS)	Dariusz Rosati (SdPL)	Paweł Piskorski (PO)	Wojciech Wierzejski (LPR)	5 seats 2004-2019		
2005	Bronisław Geremek (UW)	Michał Kamiński (PiS)	Dariusz Rosati (SdPL)	Paweł Piskorski (PO)	Bernard Wojciechowski (LPR)	5 seats 2004-2019		
2007	Bronisław Geremek (UW)	Ewa Tomaszewska (PiS)	Dariusz Rosati (SdPL)	Paweł Piskorski (PO)	Bernard Wojciechowski (LPR)	5 seats 2004-2019		
2008	Andrzej Wielowieyski (UW)	Ewa Tomaszewska (PiS)	Dariusz Rosati (SdPL)	Paweł Piskorski (PO)	Bernard Wojciechowski (LPR)	5 seats 2004-2019		
2009	Danuta Hübner (PO) (KE-KO)	Michał Kamiński (PiS)	Wojciech Olejniczak (SLD-UP)	Paweł Zalewski (PO)	Rafał Trzaskowski (PO)	5 seats 2004-2019		
2013	Danuta Hübner (PO) (KE-KO)	Michał Kamiński (PiS)	Wojciech Olejniczak (SLD-UP)	Paweł Zalewski (PO)	Tadeusz Ross (PO)	5 seats 2004-2019		
2014	Danuta Hübner (PO) (KE-KO)	Zdzisław Krasnodębski (PiS)	Marek Jurek (PiS)	Michał Boni (PO)	Michał Marusik (KNP)	5 seats 2004-2019		
2019	Danuta Hübner (PO) (KE-KO)	Jacek Saryusz-Wolski (PiS)	Ryszard Czarnecki (PiS)	Włodzimierz Cimoszewicz (KE-SLD)	Andrzej Halicki (KE-KO)	Robert Biedroń (W) (L)	6 seats 2019-2024	
2024	Marcin Kierwiński (KO)	Małgorzata Gosiewska (PiS)	Tobiasz Bocheński (PiS)	Kamila Gasiuk-Pihowicz (KO)	Michał Szczerba (KO)	Robert Biedroń (W) (L)	Ewa Zajączkowska-Hernik (KWiN)	Michał Kobosko (TD)

== Election results ==
=== 2004 ===
2004 European Parliament election
Electoral committee	Votes	%	Seats
Law and Justice	146,012	22.69	1
Freedom Union	121,805	18.93	1
Civic Platform	107,789	16.75	1
Social Democracy of Poland	80,880	12.57	1
League of Polish Families	67,796	10.54	1
Democratic Left Alliance – Labour Union	40,891	6.36	–
Self-Defence of the Republic of Poland	23,328	3.63	–
Real Politics Union	14,165	2.20	–
Polish People's Party	12,505	1.94	–
Initiative for Poland	8,588	1.33	–
Greens 2004	4,839	0.75	–
National Electoral Committee	4,133	0.64	–
Together for the Future	2,897	0.45	–
KPEiR–PLD	2,487	0.39	–
All-Poland Civic Coalition	2,195	0.34	–
Polish Labour Party	1,796	0.28	–
Konfederacja Ruch Obrony Bezrobotnych	1,303	0.20	–
Total	643,409	100.00	5
Valid votes	643,409	98.58	
Invalid/blank votes	9,273	1.42	
Total votes	652,682	100.00	
Registered voters/turnout	2,071,142	31.51	
Source: PKW

=== 2009 ===
2009 European Parliament election
Electoral committee	Votes	%	Seats
Civic Platform	434,421	52.53	3
Law and Justice	196,720	23.79	1
Democratic Left Alliance – Labour Union	84,740	10.25	1
Right Wing of the Republic	35,769	4.33	–
Agreement for the Future – CenterLeft	30,804	3.72	–
Polish People's Party	22,899	2.77	–
Real Politics Union	9,679	1.17	–
Libertas Poland	6,069	0.73	–
Polish Labour Party	3,099	0.37	–
Self-Defence of the Republic of Poland	2,826	0.34	–
Total	827,026	100.00	5
Valid votes	827,026	99.11	
Invalid/blank votes	7,455	0.89	
Total votes	834,481	100.00	
Registered voters/turnout	2,143,847	38.92	
Source: National Electoral Commission

=== 2014 ===
2014 European Parliament election
Electoral committee	Votes	%	Seats
Civic Platform	308,468	40.43	2
Law and Justice	216,773	28.41	2
Democratic Left Alliance – Labour Union	57,010	7.47	–
Congress of the New Right	49,794	6.53	1
Europa Plus—Your Movement	46,187	6.05	–
Poland Together	30,196	3.96	–
Polish People's Party	19,098	2.50	–
United Poland	15,588	2.04	–
National Movement	12,269	1.61	–
The Greens	7,503	0.98	–
Total	762,886	100.00	5
Valid votes	762,886	98.11	
Invalid/blank votes	14,727	1.89	
Total votes	777,613	100.00	
Registered voters/turnout	2,200,697	35.33	
Source: National Electoral Commission

=== 2019 ===
2019 European Parliament election
Electoral committee	Votes	%	Seats
European Coalition	625,719	45.17	3
Law and Justice	447,770	32.32	2
Spring	142,443	10.28	1
Confederation	71,784	5.18	–
Kukiz'15	49,824	3.60	–
Lewica Razem	24,778	1.79	–
Poland Fair Play	22,988	1.66	–
Total	1,385,306	100.00	6
Valid votes	1,385,306	99.48	
Invalid/blank votes	7,292	0.52	
Total votes	1,392,598	100.00	
Registered voters/turnout	2,306,657	60.37	
Source: National Electoral Commission

=== 2024 ===
2024 European Parliament election
Electoral committee	Votes	%	Seats
Civic Coalition	579,994	44.46	3
Law and Justice	323,868	24.82	2
Confederation	156,067	11.96	1
The Left	135,755	10.41	1
Third Way	92,111	7.06	1
Bezpartyjni Samorządowcy	13,797	1.06	0
PolExit	3,046	0.23	0
Total	1,304,638	100.00	8
Valid votes	1,304,638	99.61	
Invalid/blank votes	5,161	0.39	
Total votes	1,309,799	100.00	
Registered voters/turnout	2,326,513	56.30	
Source: National Electoral Commission
