= Greater Poland (European Parliament constituency) =

Constituency of the European Parliament

- European Parliament constituency
- Location among the current constituencies

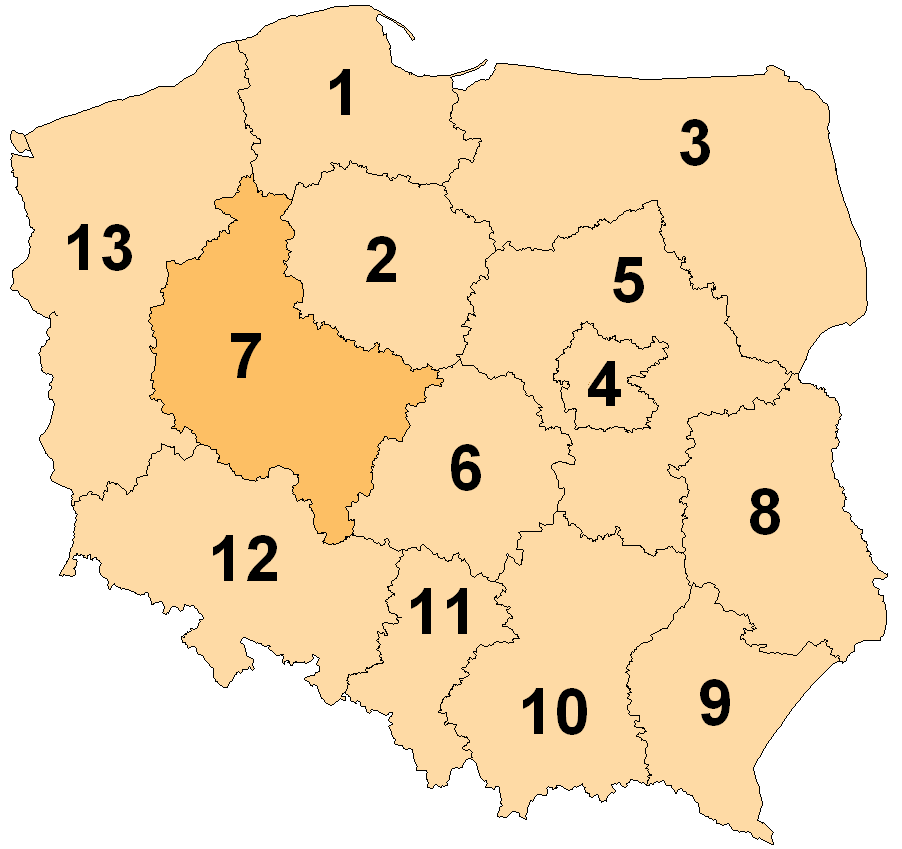
- 7th constituency in Poland
- Member state: Poland
- Created: 2004
- MEPs: 5 (2009-2024); 6 (2004-2009, since 2024)

Greater Poland (Polish: wielkopolskie) is a constituency of the European Parliament. It consists of the Greater Poland Voivodeship.

== Nomenclature ==
The relevant Polish legislation ("The Act of 23 January 2004 on Elections to the European Parliament") establishing the constituencies does not give the constituencies formal names. Instead, each constituency has a number, territorial description, and location of the Constituency Electoral Commission. The 2004 Polish National Election Commission and the 2004 European Parliament Election website uses the territorial description when referring to the constituency, not the electoral commission location.

== Members of the European Parliament ==
Election	MEP (party)	MEP (party)	MEP (party)	MEP (party)	MEP (party)	MEP (party)
2004	Jan Kułakowski (UW)	Witold Tomczak (LPR)	Filip Kaczmarek (PO)	Marcin Libicki (PiS)	Marek Siwiec (SLD-UP)	Jan Masiel (SRP)
2009	Sidonia Jędrzejewska (PO)	Andrzej Grzyb (PSL)	Filip Kaczmarek (PO)	Konrad Szymański (PiS)	Marek Siwiec (SLD-UP)	5 seats 2009-2024
2014	Adam Szejnfeld (PO)	Andrzej Grzyb (PSL)	Agnieszka Kozłowska-Rajewicz (PO)	Ryszard Czarnecki (PiS)	Krystyna Łybacka (SLD-UP)	5 seats 2009-2024
2019	Ewa Kopacz (KE) (KO)	Zdzisław Krasnodębski (PiS)	Leszek Miller (KE)	Andżelika Możdżanowska (PiS)	Sylwia Spurek (W)	5 seats 2009-2024
2024	Ewa Kopacz (KE) (KO)	Krzysztof Hetman (TD)	Michał Wawrykiewicz (KO)	Marlena Maląg (PiS)	Joanna Scheuring-Wielgus (L)	Anna Bryłka (KWiN)

== Election results ==
=== 2004 ===
2004 European Parliament election
Electoral committee	Votes	%	Seats
Civic Platform	109,861	20.73	1
League of Polish Families	69,703	13.15	1
Democratic Left Alliance – Labour Union	63,046	11.90	1
Self-Defence of the Republic of Poland	60,489	11.41	1
Law and Justice	57,361	10.82	1
Freedom Union	56,849	10.73	1
Polish People's Party	37,779	7.13	–
Social Democracy of Poland	18,694	3.53	–
Initiative for Poland	15,061	2.84	–
National Electoral Committee	14,600	2.76	–
Real Politics Union	7,142	1.35	–
Konfederacja Ruch Obrony Bezrobotnych	6,399	1.21	–
All-Poland Civic Coalition	6,070	1.15	–
KPEiR–PLD	4,112	0.78	–
Polish Labour Party	2,759	0.52	–
Total	529,925	100.00	6
Valid votes	529,925	96.36	
Invalid/blank votes	19,992	3.64	
Total votes	549,917	100.00	
Registered voters/turnout	2,595,256	21.19	
Source: PKW

=== 2009 ===
2009 European Parliament election
Electoral committee	Votes	%	Seats
Civic Platform	289,442	45.79	2
Law and Justice	121,216	19.17	1
Democratic Left Alliance – Labour Union	94,180	14.90	1
Polish People's Party	52,716	8.34	1
Agreement for the Future – CenterLeft	23,777	3.76	–
Right Wing of the Republic	18,273	2.89	–
Self-Defence of the Republic of Poland	12,725	2.01	–
Real Politics Union	7,621	1.21	–
Libertas Poland	6,703	1.06	–
Polish Labour Party	5,517	0.87	–
Total	632,170	100.00	5
Valid votes	632,170	97.58	
Invalid/blank votes	15,648	2.42	
Total votes	647,818	100.00	
Registered voters/turnout	2,685,054	24.13	
Source: National Electoral Commission

=== 2014 ===
2014 European Parliament election
Electoral committee	Votes	%	Seats
Civic Platform	192,801	32.95	2
Law and Justice	142,675	24.38	1
Democratic Left Alliance – Labour Union	74,695	12.77	1
Polish People's Party	61,431	10.50	1
Congress of the New Right	40,540	6.93	–
Europa Plus—Your Movement	29,112	4.98	–
United Poland	20,816	3.56	–
Poland Together	16,144	2.76	–
National Movement	6,905	1.18	–
Total	585,119	100.00	5
Valid votes	585,119	95.92	
Invalid/blank votes	24,874	4.08	
Total votes	609,993	100.00	
Registered voters/turnout	2,720,826	22.42	
Source: National Electoral Commission

=== 2019 ===
2019 European Parliament election
Electoral committee	Votes	%	Seats
European Coalition	518,706	43.25	2
Law and Justice	460,432	38.39	2
Spring	93,504	7.80	1
Confederation	55,970	4.67	–
Kukiz'15	51,500	4.29	–
Lewica Razem	19,226	1.60	–
Total	1,199,338	100.00	5
Valid votes	1,199,338	99.06	
Invalid/blank votes	11,439	0.94	
Total votes	1,210,777	100.00	
Registered voters/turnout	2,699,054	44.86	
Source: National Electoral Commission

=== 2024 ===
2024 European Parliament election
Electoral committee	Votes	%	Seats
Civic Coalition	399,299	38.85	2
Law and Justice	297,286	28.92	1
Confederation	135,416	13.18	1
Third Way	94,951	9.24	1
The Left	82,845	8.06	1
Bezpartyjni Samorządowcy	7,761	0.76	0
Normal Country	5,460	0.53	0
Liberal Poland – Entrepreneurs' Strike	2,437	0.24	0
PolExit	2,366	0.23	0
Total	1,027,821	100.00	6
Valid votes	1,027,821	99.32	
Invalid/blank votes	7,036	0.68	
Total votes	1,034,857	100.00	
Registered voters/turnout	2,642,860	39.16	
Source: National Electoral Commission
