= Silesian (European Parliament constituency) =

Constituency of the European Parliament

- European Parliament constituency
- Location among the current constituencies

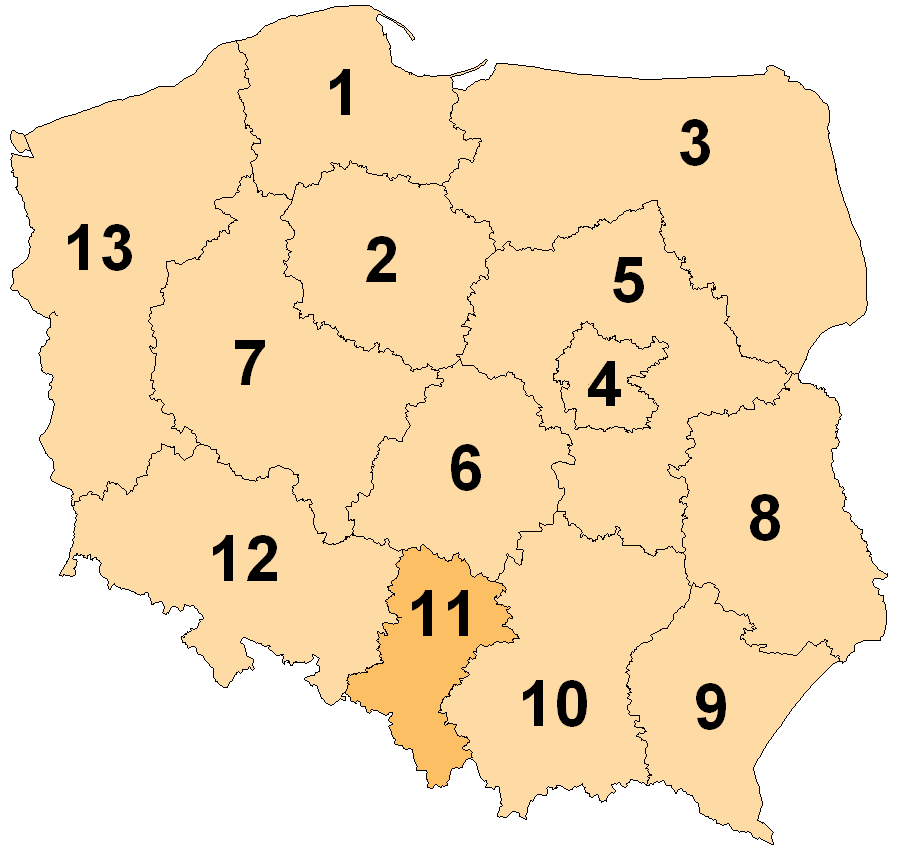
- 11th constituency in Poland
- Member state: Poland
- Created: 2004
- MEPs: 7 (since 2014); 6 (2009-2014); 8 (2004-2009)

Silesian (Polish: śląskie) is a constituency of the European Parliament. It consists of the Silesian Voivodeship.

== Nomenclature ==
The relevant Polish legislation ("The Act of 23 January 2004 on Elections to the European Parliament") establishing the constituencies does not give the constituencies formal names. Instead, each constituency has a number, territorial description, and location of the Constituency Electoral Commission. The 2004 Polish National Election Commission and the 2004 European Parliament Election website uses the territorial description when referring to the constituency, not the electoral commission location.

== Members of the European Parliament ==
Election	MEP (party)	MEP (party)	MEP (party)	MEP (party)	MEP (party)	MEP (party)	MEP (party)	MEP (party)
2004	Jerzy Buzek (PO) (KO)	Adam Gierek (SLD-UP)	Maciej Giertych (LPR)	Jan Olbrycht (PO) (KO)	Wojciech Roszkowski (PiS)	Małgorzata Handzlik (PO)	Genowefa Grabowska (SdPL)	Grażyna Staniszewska (UW)
2009	Jerzy Buzek (PO) (KO)	Adam Gierek (SLD-UP)	Marek Migalski (PiS)	Jan Olbrycht (PO) (KO)	Bogdan Marcinkiewicz (PO)	Małgorzata Handzlik (PO)	6 seats 2009-2014	
2014	Jerzy Buzek (PO) (KO)	Adam Gierek (SLD-UP)	Bolesław Piecha (PiS)	Jan Olbrycht (PO) (KO)	Jadwiga Wiśniewska (PiS)	Marek Plura (PO)	Janusz Korwin-Mikke (KNP)	7 seats 2014-2024
2018	Jerzy Buzek (PO) (KO)	Adam Gierek (SLD-UP)	Bolesław Piecha (PiS)	Jan Olbrycht (PO) (KO)	Jadwiga Wiśniewska (PiS)	Marek Plura (PO)	Dobromir Sośnierz (KNP)	7 seats 2014-2024
2019	Jerzy Buzek (PO) (KO)	Marek Balt (L)	Grzegorz Tobiszowski (PiS)	Jan Olbrycht (PO) (KO)	Jadwiga Wiśniewska (PiS)	Łukasz Kohut (L) (KO)	Izabela Kloc (PiS)	7 seats 2014-2024
2024	Borys Budka (KO)	Mirosława Nykiel (KO)	Patryk Jaki (PiS)	Marcin Sypniewski (KWiN)	Jadwiga Wiśniewska (PiS)	Łukasz Kohut (L) (KO)	6 seats since 2024	

== Election results ==
=== 2004 ===
2004 European Parliament election
Electoral committee	Votes	%	Seats
Civic Platform	274,985	36.01	3
Democratic Left Alliance – Labour Union	96,045	12.58	1
League of Polish Families	92,326	12.09	1
Law and Justice	72,571	9.50	1
Self-Defence of the Republic of Poland	49,013	6.42	–
Freedom Union	41,888	5.49	1
Social Democracy of Poland	41,052	5.38	1
Polish People's Party	23,449	3.07	–
Initiative for Poland	17,288	2.26	–
Reason Party	10,620	1.39	–
Konfederacja Ruch Obrony Bezrobotnych	10,054	1.32	–
Real Politics Union	8,540	1.12	–
National Electoral Committee	7,271	0.95	–
Greens 2004	6,612	0.87	–
Polish Labour Party	4,917	0.64	–
KPEiR–PLD	4,387	0.57	–
All-Poland Civic Coalition	2,599	0.34	–
Total	763,617	100.00	8
Valid votes	763,617	97.52	
Invalid/blank votes	19,443	2.48	
Total votes	783,060	100.00	
Registered voters/turnout	3,759,664	20.83	
Source: PKW

=== 2009 ===
2009 European Parliament election
Electoral committee	Votes	%	Seats
Civic Platform	523,602	56.17	4
Law and Justice	207,429	22.25	1
Democratic Left Alliance – Labour Union	117,884	12.65	1
Polish People's Party	23,566	2.53	–
Agreement for the Future – CenterLeft	16,351	1.75	–
Right Wing of the Republic	12,447	1.34	–
Real Politics Union	8,155	0.87	–
Self-Defence of the Republic of Poland	7,665	0.82	–
Polish Labour Party	7,651	0.82	–
Libertas Poland	5,906	0.63	–
Forward Poland–Piast	1,537	0.16	–
Total	932,193	100.00	6
Valid votes	932,193	98.33	
Invalid/blank votes	15,878	1.67	
Total votes	948,071	100.00	
Registered voters/turnout	3,753,124	25.26	
Source: National Electoral Commission

=== 2014 ===
2014 European Parliament election
Electoral committee	Votes	%	Seats
Civic Platform	337,478	39.82	3
Law and Justice	234,515	27.67	2
Democratic Left Alliance – Labour Union	79,543	9.39	1
Congress of the New Right	73,573	8.68	1
Europa Plus—Your Movement	31,922	3.77	–
United Poland	31,371	3.70	–
Poland Together	23,054	2.72	–
Polish People's Party	18,480	2.18	–
National Movement	9,482	1.12	–
The Greens	4,757	0.56	–
Direct Democracy	3,244	0.38	–
Total	847,419	100.00	7
Valid votes	847,419	97.13	
Invalid/blank votes	24,998	2.87	
Total votes	872,417	100.00	
Registered voters/turnout	3,673,738	23.75	
Source: National Electoral Commission

=== 2019 ===
2019 European Parliament election
Electoral committee	Votes	%	Seats
Law and Justice	691,641	43.25	3
European Coalition	643,567	40.24	3
Spring	93,120	5.82	1
Confederation	73,761	4.61	–
Kukiz'15	60,812	3.80	–
Lewica Razem	18,813	1.18	–
Poland Fair Play	17,617	1.10	–
Total	1,599,331	100.00	7
Valid votes	1,599,331	99.23	
Invalid/blank votes	12,389	0.77	
Total votes	1,611,720	100.00	
Registered voters/turnout	3,514,574	45.86	
Source: National Electoral Commission

=== 2024 ===
2024 European Parliament election
Electoral committee	Votes	%	Seats
Civic Coalition	551,782	41.42	3
Law and Justice	485,505	36.45	2
Confederation	135,195	10.15	1
Third Way	74,125	5.56	–
The Left	61,653	4.63	–
Bezpartyjni Samorządowcy	9,359	0.70	–
Normal Country	6,248	0.47	–
Repair Poland Movement	3,311	0.25	–
PolExit	2,861	0.21	–
Liberal Poland – Entrepreneurs' Strike	2,082	0.16	–
Total	1,332,121	100.00	6
Valid votes	1,332,121	99.48	
Invalid/blank votes	7,002	0.52	
Total votes	1,339,123	100.00	
Registered voters/turnout	3,322,289	40.31	
Source: National Electoral Commission
