= Łódź (European Parliament constituency) =

Constituency of the European Parliament

- European Parliament constituency
- Location among the current constituencies

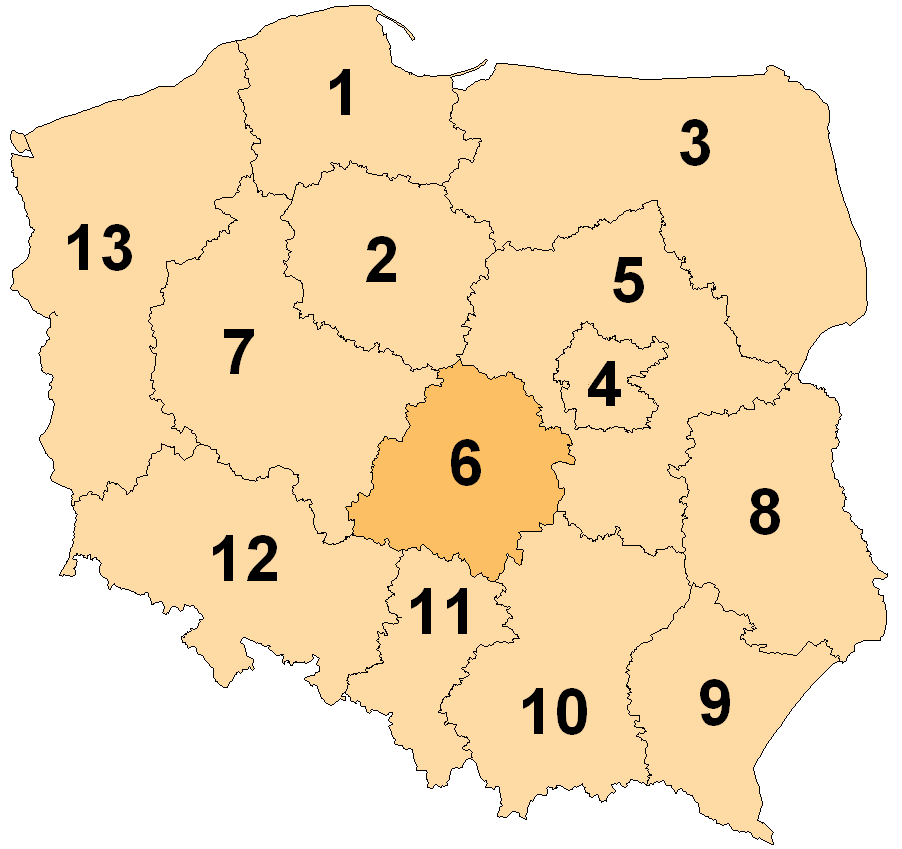
- 6th constituency in Poland
- Member state: Poland
- Created: 2004
- MEPs: 2 (since 2024, 2014-2019); 3 (2019-2024, 2009-2014); 4 (2004-2009)

Łódź is a constituency of the European Parliament. It covers the area of the Łódź Voivodeship.

== Nomenclature ==
The relevant Polish legislation ("The Act of 23 January 2004 on Elections to the European Parliament") establishing the constituencies does not give the constituencies formal names. Instead, each constituency has a number, territorial description, and location of the Constituency Electoral Commission. The 2004 Polish National Election Commission and the 2004 European Parliament Election website uses the territorial description when referring to the constituency, not the electoral commission location.

== Members of the European Parliament ==
Election	MEP (party)	MEP (party)	MEP (party)	MEP (party)
2004	Jacek Saryusz-Wolski (PO)	Janusz Wojciechowski (PSL) (PiS)	Urszula Krupa (LPR)	Bogdan Golik (SRP)
2009	Jacek Saryusz-Wolski (PO)	Janusz Wojciechowski (PSL) (PiS)	Joanna Skrzydlewska (PO)	3 seats 2009-2014
2014	Jacek Saryusz-Wolski (PO)	Janusz Wojciechowski (PSL) (PiS)	2 seats 2014-2019	
2016	Jacek Saryusz-Wolski (PO)	Urszula Krupa (PiS)	2 seats 2014-2019	
2019	Marek Belka (L/KE)	Witold Waszczykowski (PiS)	Joanna Kopcińska (PiS)	3 seats since 2019
2024	Dariusz Joński (KO)	Waldemar Buda (PiS)	2 seats since 2024	

== Election results ==
=== 2004 ===
2004 European Parliament election
Electoral committee	Votes	%	Seats
Civic Platform	91,331	23.20	1
League of Polish Families	66,394	16.87	1
Self-Defence of the Republic of Poland	53,120	13.50	1
Polish People's Party	41,089	10.44	1
Democratic Left Alliance – Labour Union	38,878	9.88	–
Law and Justice	36,404	9.25	–
Social Democracy of Poland	18,153	4.61	–
Freedom Union	15,251	3.87	–
Real Politics Union	9,415	2.39	–
KPEiR–PLD	6,535	1.66	–
National Electoral Committee	4,635	1.18	–
Konfederacja Ruch Obrony Bezrobotnych	4,189	1.06	–
Initiative for Poland	2,318	0.59	–
All-Poland Civic Coalition	2,270	0.58	–
Polish Labour Party	1,701	0.43	–
National Revival of Poland	1,090	0.28	–
Polish National Party	826	0.21	–
Total	393,599	100.00	4
Valid votes	393,599	97.14	
Invalid/blank votes	11,585	2.86	
Total votes	405,184	100.00	
Registered voters/turnout	2,078,974	19.49	

=== 2009 ===
2009 European Parliament election
Electoral committee	Votes	%	Seats
Civic Platform	204,798	42.74	2
Law and Justice	134,947	28.16	1
Democratic Left Alliance – Labour Union	62,923	13.13	–
Polish People's Party	32,390	6.76	–
Agreement for the Future – CenterLeft	16,081	3.36	–
Self-Defence of the Republic of Poland	9,827	2.05	–
Right Wing of the Republic	5,966	1.25	–
Real Politics Union	4,777	1.00	–
Libertas Poland	3,988	0.83	–
Polish Labour Party	3,453	0.72	–
Total	479,150	100.00	3
Valid votes	479,150	98.19	
Invalid/blank votes	8,821	1.81	
Total votes	487,971	100.00	
Registered voters/turnout	2,071,649	23.55	
Source: National Electoral Commission

=== 2014 ===
2014 European Parliament election
Electoral committee	Votes	%	Seats
Law and Justice	177,654	37.92	1
Civic Platform	149,474	31.91	1
Democratic Left Alliance – Labour Union	35,344	7.54	–
Polish People's Party	29,615	6.32	–
Congress of the New Right	29,202	6.23	–
Europa Plus—Your Movement	11,597	2.48	–
Poland Together	11,332	2.42	–
United Poland	11,278	2.41	–
National Movement	5,736	1.22	–
The Greens	3,177	0.68	–
Direct Democracy	2,846	0.61	–
Self-Defence	1,212	0.26	–
Total	468,467	100.00	2
Valid votes	468,467	97.01	
Invalid/blank votes	14,451	2.99	
Total votes	482,918	100.00	
Registered voters/turnout	2,036,030	23.72	
Source: National Electoral Commission

=== 2019 ===
2019 European Parliament election
Electoral committee	Votes	%	Seats
Law and Justice	426,046	46.69	2
European Coalition	347,620	38.09	1
Spring	50,696	5.56	–
Confederation	37,899	4.15	–
Kukiz'15	32,476	3.56	–
Lewica Razem	17,849	1.96	–
Total	912,586	100.00	3
Valid votes	912,586	99.22	
Invalid/blank votes	7,207	0.78	
Total votes	919,793	100.00	
Registered voters/turnout	1,960,252	46.92	
Source: National Electoral Commission

=== 2024 ===
2024 European Parliament election
Electoral committee	Votes	%	Seats
Law and Justice	292,596	38.60	1
Civic Coalition	252,318	33.29	1
Confederation	83,098	10.96	0
The Left	75,285	9.93	0
Third Way	44,780	5.91	0
Bezpartyjni Samorządowcy	6,318	0.83	0
PolExit	1,868	0.25	0
Liberal Poland – Entrepreneurs' Strike	1,699	0.22	0
Total	757,962	100.00	2
Valid votes	757,962	99.45	
Invalid/blank votes	4,217	0.55	
Total votes	762,179	100.00	
Registered voters/turnout	1,854,108	41.11	
Source: National Electoral Commission
