= Lesser Poland and Świętokrzyskie (European Parliament constituency) =

Constituency of the European Parliament

- European Parliament constituency
- Location among the current constituencies

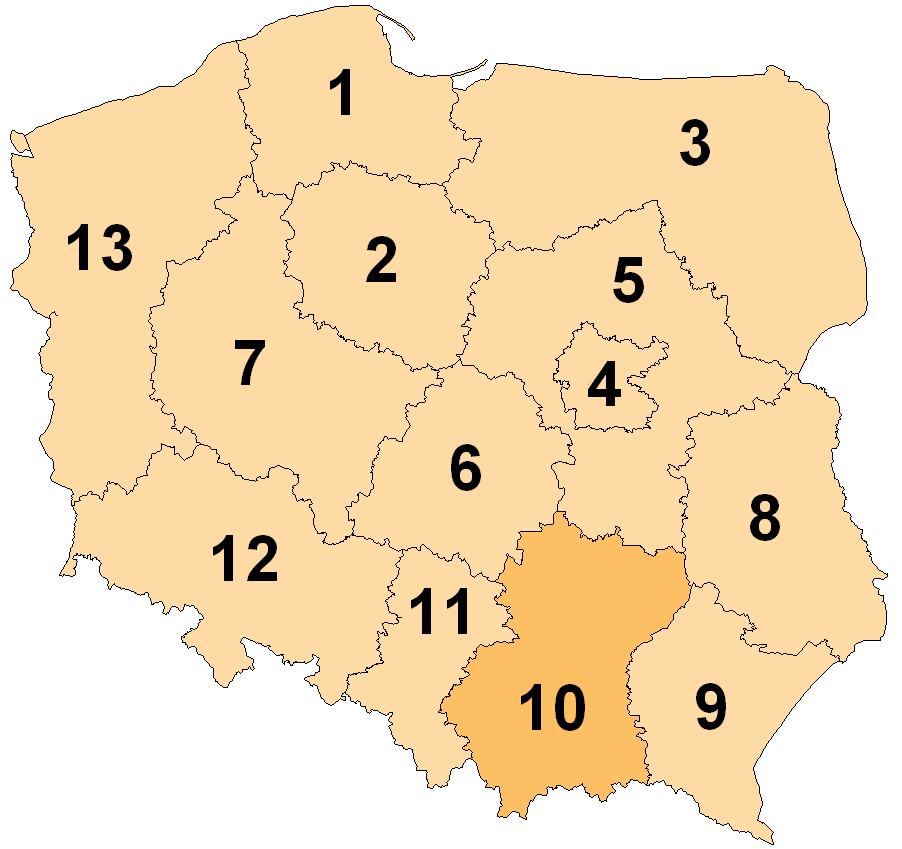
- 10th constituency in Poland
- Member state: Poland
- Created: 2004
- MEPs: 7 (since 2024, 2009-2019); 6 (2020-2024); 5 (2019-2020); 8 (2004-2009)

Lesser Poland and Świętokrzyskie (Polish: małopolskie i świętokrzyskie) is a constituency of the European Parliament. It consists of the Lesser Poland Voivodeship and Świętokrzyskie Voivodeship.

== Nomenclature ==
The relevant Polish legislation ("The Act of 23 January 2004 on Elections to the European Parliament") establishing the constituencies does not give the constituencies formal names. Instead, each constituency has a number, territorial description, and location of the Constituency Electoral Commission. The 2004 Polish National Election Commission and the 2004 European Parliament Election website uses the territorial description when referring to the constituency, not the electoral commission location.

== Members of the European Parliament ==
Election	MEP (party)	MEP (party)	MEP (party)	MEP (party)	MEP (party)	MEP (party)	MEP (party)	MEP (party)
2004	Bogdan Pęk (LPR)	Adam Bielan (PiS)	Janusz Onyszkiewicz (UW)	Bogdan Klich (PO)	Czesław Siekierski (PSL)	Bogusław Sonik (PO)	Andrzej Szejna (SLD-UP)	Leopold Rutowicz (SRP)
2007	Bogdan Pęk (LPR)	Adam Bielan (PiS)	Janusz Onyszkiewicz (UW)	Urszula Gacek (PO)	Czesław Siekierski (PSL)	Bogusław Sonik (PO)	Andrzej Szejna (SLD-UP)	Leopold Rutowicz (SRP)
2009	Zbigniew Ziobro (PiS)	Paweł Kowal (PiS)	Jacek Włosowicz (PiS)	Róża Thun (PO) (KE)	Czesław Siekierski (PSL)	Bogusław Sonik (PO)	Joanna Senyszyn (SLD-UP)	7 seats 2009-2019
2014	Andrzej Duda (PiS)	Ryszard Legutko (PiS)	Beata Gosiewska (PiS)	Róża Thun (PO) (KE)	Czesław Siekierski (PSL)	Bogdan Wenta (PO)	Stanisław Żółtek (KNP)	7 seats 2009-2019
2015	Edward Czesak (PiS)	Ryszard Legutko (PiS)	Beata Gosiewska (PiS)	Róża Thun (PO) (KE)	Czesław Siekierski (PSL)	Bogdan Wenta (PO)	Stanisław Żółtek (KNP)	7 seats 2009-2019
2018	Edward Czesak (PiS)	Ryszard Legutko (PiS)	Beata Gosiewska (PiS)	Róża Thun (PO) (KE)	Czesław Siekierski (PSL)	Bogusław Sonik (PO)	Stanisław Żółtek (KNP)	7 seats 2009-2019
2019	Beata Szydło (PiS)	Ryszard Legutko (PiS)	Patryk Jaki (PiS)	Róża Thun (PO) (KE)	Adam Jarubas (KE) (TD)	5 seats 2019-2020		
2020	Beata Szydło (PiS)	Ryszard Legutko (PiS)	Patryk Jaki (PiS)	Róża Thun (PO) (KE)	Adam Jarubas (KE) (TD)	Dominik Tarczyński (PiS)	6 seats 2020-2024	
2024	Beata Szydło (PiS)	Arkadiusz Mularczyk (PiS)	Bartłomiej Sienkiewicz (KO)	Jagna Marczułajtis-Walczak (KO)	Adam Jarubas (KE) (TD)	Dominik Tarczyński (PiS)	Grzegorz Braun (KWiN)	7 seats since 2024

== Election results ==
=== 2004 ===
2004 European Parliament election
Electoral committee	Votes	%	Seats
Civic Platform	162,293	22.33	2
League of Polish Families	150,091	20.65	1
Law and Justice	108,220	14.89	1
Self-Defence of the Republic of Poland	72,798	10.02	1
Freedom Union	57,071	7.85	1
Polish People's Party	54,566	7.51	1
Democratic Left Alliance – Labour Union	51,811	7.13	1
Social Democracy of Poland	24,696	3.40	–
National Electoral Committee	13,554	1.87	–
Real Politics Union	12,960	1.78	–
Initiative for Poland	7,683	1.06	–
KPEiR–PLD	4,259	0.59	–
Polish Labour Party	3,902	0.54	–
All-Poland Civic Coalition	2,766	0.38	–
Total	726,670	100.00	8
Valid votes	726,670	97.50	
Invalid/blank votes	18,657	2.50	
Total votes	745,327	100.00	
Registered voters/turnout	3,528,132	21.13	
Source: PKW

=== 2009 ===
2009 European Parliament election
Electoral committee	Votes	%	Seats
Law and Justice	383,631	41.18	3
Civic Platform	327,854	35.19	2
Democratic Left Alliance – Labour Union	95,277	10.23	1
Polish People's Party	60,846	6.53	1
Agreement for the Future – CenterLeft	17,645	1.89	–
Right Wing of the Republic	12,307	1.32	–
Real Politics Union	10,236	1.10	–
Self-Defence of the Republic of Poland	9,430	1.01	–
Libertas Poland	9,005	0.97	–
Polish Labour Party	5,428	0.58	–
Total	931,659	100.00	7
Valid votes	931,659	98.24	
Invalid/blank votes	16,657	1.76	
Total votes	948,316	100.00	
Registered voters/turnout	3,632,503	26.11	
Source: National Electoral Commission

=== 2014 ===
2014 European Parliament election
Electoral committee	Votes	%	Seats
Law and Justice	307,624	33.61	3
Civic Platform	232,330	25.39	2
United Poland	82,433	9.01	–
Congress of the New Right	72,393	7.91	1
Democratic Left Alliance – Labour Union	62,748	6.86	–
Polish People's Party	58,541	6.40	1
Poland Together	55,278	6.04	–
Europa Plus—Your Movement	27,217	2.97	–
National Movement	11,930	1.30	–
Direct Democracy	4,717	0.52	–
Total	915,211	100.00	7
Valid votes	915,211	96.44	
Invalid/blank votes	33,764	3.56	
Total votes	948,975	100.00	
Registered voters/turnout	3,686,945	25.74	
Source: National Electoral Commission

=== 2019 ===
2019 European Parliament election
Electoral committee	Votes	%	Seats
Law and Justice	980,816	56.33	4
European Coalition	505,400	29.03	2
Spring	78,568	4.51	–
Confederation	73,613	4.23	–
Kukiz'15	67,272	3.86	–
Lewica Razem	16,813	0.97	–
Poland Fair Play	13,128	0.75	–
PolEXIT-Coalition	5,512	0.32	–
Total	1,741,122	100.00	6
Valid votes	1,741,122	99.15	
Invalid/blank votes	15,006	0.85	
Total votes	1,756,128	100.00	
Registered voters/turnout	3,667,333	47.89	
Source: National Electoral Commission

=== 2024 ===
2024 European Parliament election
Electoral committee	Votes	%	Seats
Law and Justice	655,777	44.05	3
Civic Coalition	401,371	26.96	2
Confederation	210,553	14.14	1
Third Way	131,106	8.81	1
The Left	70,403	4.73	–
Bezpartyjni Samorządowcy	10,691	0.72	–
Normal Country	3,950	0.27	–
PolExit	3,704	0.25	–
Liberal Poland – Entrepreneurs' Strike	1,193	0.08	–
Total	1,488,748	100.00	7
Valid votes	1,488,748	99.47	
Invalid/blank votes	7,951	0.53	
Total votes	1,496,699	100.00	
Registered voters/turnout	3,583,080	41.77	
Source: National Electoral Commission
