= Lower Silesian and Opole (European Parliament constituency) =

Constituency of the European Parliament

- European Parliament constituency
- Location among the current constituencies

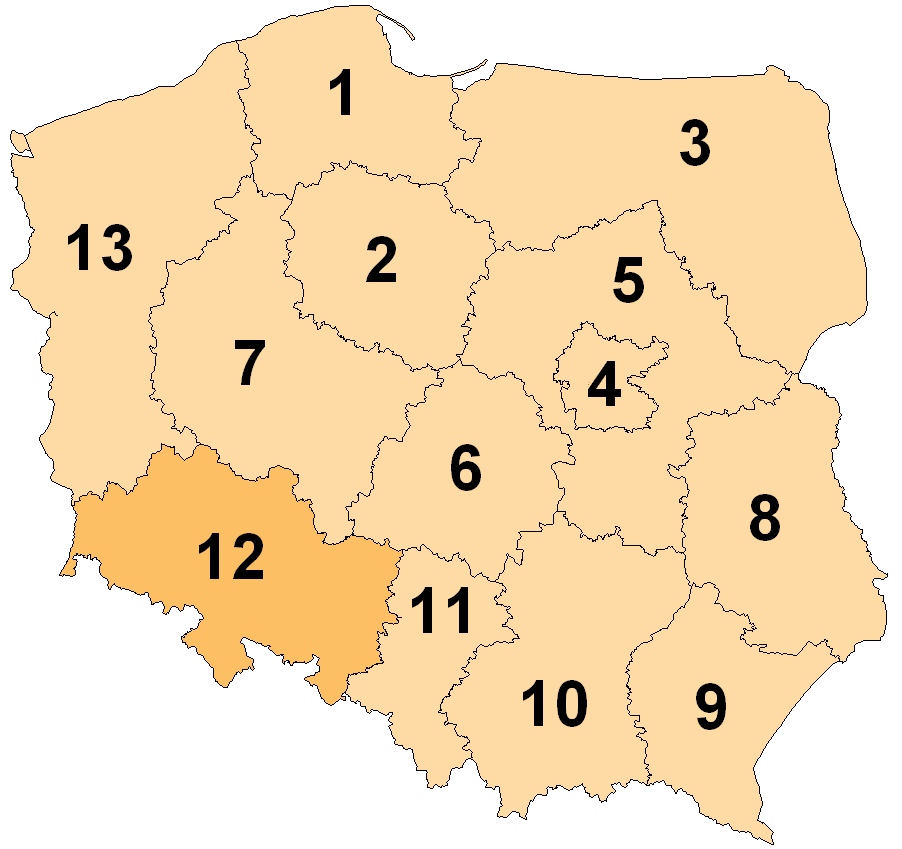
- 12th constituency in Poland
- Member state: Poland
- Created: 2004
- MEPs: 6 (2014-2019, since 2024) 4 (2019-2024); 5 (2009-2014); 7 (2004-2009)

Lower Silesian and Opole (Polish: dolnośląskie i opolskie) is a constituency of the European Parliament. It consists of the Lower Silesian Voivodeship and Opole Voivodeship.

== Nomenclature ==
The relevant Polish legislation ("The Act of 23 January 2004 on Elections to the European Parliament") establishing the constituencies does not give the constituencies formal names. Instead, each constituency has a number, territorial description, and location of the Constituency Electoral Commission. The 2004 Polish National Election Commission and the 2004 European Parliament Election website uses the territorial description when referring to the constituency, not the electoral commission location.

== Members of the European Parliament ==
Election	MEP (party)	MEP (party)	MEP (party)	MEP (party)	MEP (party)	MEP (party)	MEP (party)
2004	Jacek Protasiewicz (PO)	Sylwester Chruszcz (LPR)	Lidia Geringer de Oedenberg (SLD-UP)	Konrad Szymański (PiS)	Stanisław Jałowiecki (PO)	Ryszard Czarnecki (SRP)	Józef Pinior (SdPL)
2009	Jacek Protasiewicz (PO)	Piotr Borys (PO)	Lidia Geringer de Oedenberg (SLD-UP)	Ryszard Legutko (PiS)	Danuta Jazłowiecka (PO)	5 seats 2009-2014	
2014	Bogdan Zdrojewski (PO)	Dawid Jackiewicz (PiS)	Lidia Geringer de Oedenberg (SLD-UP)	Kazimierz Michał Ujazdowski (PiS)	Danuta Jazłowiecka (PO)	Robert Iwaszkiewicz (KNP)	6 seats 2014-2019
2015	Bogdan Zdrojewski (PO)	Sławomir Kłosowski (PiS)	Lidia Geringer de Oedenberg (SLD-UP)	Kazimierz Michał Ujazdowski (PiS)	Danuta Jazłowiecka (PO)	Robert Iwaszkiewicz (KNP)	6 seats 2014-2019
2019	Janina Ochojska (KE)	Beata Kempa (PiS)	Jarosław Duda (KE) (KO)	Anna Zalewska (PiS)	4 seats 2019-2024		
2024	Bogdan Zdrojewski (KO)	Michał Dworczyk (PiS)	Jarosław Duda (KE) (KO)	Krzysztof Śmiszek (L)	Andrzej Buła (KO)	Stanisław Tyszka (KWiN)	6 seats since 2024

== Election results ==
=== 2004 ===
2004 European Parliament election
Electoral committee	Votes	%	Seats
Civic Platform	161,564	27.31	2
League of Polish Families	84,112	14.22	1
Democratic Left Alliance – Labour Union	71,848	12.15	1
Self-Defence of the Republic of Poland	69,720	11.79	1
Law and Justice	55,577	9.40	1
Freedom Union	31,780	5.37	–
Social Democracy of Poland	29,223	4.94	1
Real Politics Union	24,183	4.09	–
Polish People's Party	16,877	2.85	–
Initiative for Poland	13,349	2.26	–
Reason Party	7,448	1.26	–
National Electoral Committee	7,211	1.22	–
Greens 2004	4,837	0.82	–
KPEiR–PLD	4,276	0.72	–
Polish Labour Party	3,349	0.57	–
All-Poland Civic Coalition	2,774	0.47	–
Konfederacja Ruch Obrony Bezrobotnych	1,909	0.32	–
National Revival of Poland	1,456	0.25	–
Total	591,493	100.00	7
Valid votes	591,493	97.38	
Invalid/blank votes	15,928	2.62	
Total votes	607,421	100.00	
Registered voters/turnout	3,148,563	19.29	
Source: PKW

=== 2009 ===
2009 European Parliament election
Electoral committee	Votes	%	Seats
Civic Platform	347,617	49.04	3
Law and Justice	163,197	23.02	1
Democratic Left Alliance – Labour Union	93,172	13.14	1
Polish People's Party	41,975	5.92	–
Agreement for the Future – CenterLeft	19,387	2.74	–
Self-Defence of the Republic of Poland	11,771	1.66	–
Right Wing of the Republic	8,736	1.23	–
Real Politics Union	8,422	1.19	–
Libertas Poland	8,266	1.17	–
Polish Labour Party	6,282	0.89	–
Total	708,825	100.00	5
Valid votes	708,825	98.20	
Invalid/blank votes	13,029	1.80	
Total votes	721,854	100.00	
Registered voters/turnout	3,170,270	22.77	
Source: National Electoral Commission

=== 2014 ===
2014 European Parliament election
Electoral committee	Votes	%	Seats
Civic Platform	252,513	38.14	2
Law and Justice	179,432	27.10	2
Democratic Left Alliance – Labour Union	78,557	11.87	1
Congress of the New Right	47,615	7.19	1
United Poland	30,312	4.58	–
Polish People's Party	28,087	4.24	–
Europa Plus—Your Movement	20,896	3.16	–
Poland Together	16,369	2.47	–
National Movement	8,285	1.25	–
Total	662,066	100.00	6
Valid votes	662,066	96.78	
Invalid/blank votes	22,017	3.22	
Total votes	684,083	100.00	
Registered voters/turnout	3,147,531	21.73	
Source: National Electoral Commission

=== 2019 ===
2019 European Parliament election
Electoral committee	Votes	%	Seats
European Coalition	574,397	43.87	2
Law and Justice	506,921	38.72	2
Spring	88,515	6.76	–
Confederation	65,208	4.98	–
Kukiz'15	56,807	4.34	–
Lewica Razem	17,437	1.33	–
Total	1,309,285	100.00	4
Valid votes	1,309,285	99.22	
Invalid/blank votes	10,265	0.78	
Total votes	1,319,550	100.00	
Registered voters/turnout	3,051,668	43.24	
Source: National Electoral Commission

=== 2024 ===
2024 European Parliament election
Electoral committee	Votes	%	Seats
Civic Coalition	476,479	41.59	2
Law and Justice	360,558	31.48	2
Confederation	134,122	11.71	1
The Left	101,362	8.85	1
Third Way	56,088	4.90	–
Bezpartyjni Samorządowcy	13,981	1.22	–
PolExit	2,935	0.26	–
Total	1,145,525	100.00	6
Valid votes	1,145,525	99.40	
Invalid/blank votes	6,969	0.60	
Total votes	1,152,494	100.00	
Registered voters/turnout	2,921,817	39.44	
Source: National Electoral Commission
