= Podlaskie and Warmian–Masurian (European Parliament constituency) =

Constituency of the European Parliament

Podlaskie and Warmian-Masurian
- European Parliament constituency
- Location among the current constituencies

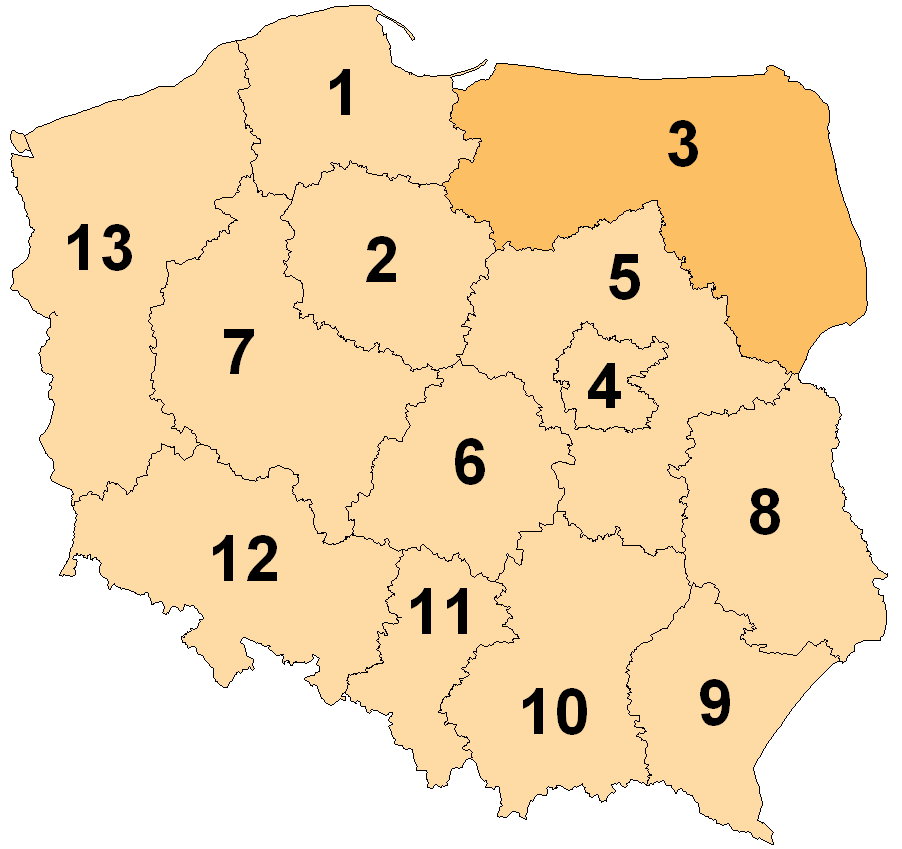
- 3rd constituency in Poland
- Member state: Poland
- Created: 2004
- MEPs: 2 (since 2024) (2004-2019); 3 (2019-2024)

Podlaskie and Warmian-Masurian (Polish: podlaskie i warmińsko-mazurskie) is a constituency of the European Parliament. It consists of the Podlaskie Voivodeship and Warmian-Masurian Voivodeship.

The chief cities are Elbląg, Olsztyn and Białystok.

== Nomenclature ==
The relevant Polish legislation ("The Act of 23 January 2004 on Elections to the European Parliament") establishing the constituencies does not give the constituencies formal names. Instead, each constituency has a number, territorial description, and location of the Constituency Electoral Commission. The 2004 Polish National Election Commission and the 2004 European Parliament Election website uses the territorial description when referring to the constituency, not the electoral commission location.

== Members of the European Parliament ==
| Election | MEP (party) | MEP (party) | MEP (party) |
|---|---|---|---|
| 2004 | Barbara Kudrycka (PO) | Bogusław Rogalski (LPR) | 2 seats 2004-2019 |
| 2007 | Krzysztof Hołowczyc (PO) | Bogusław Rogalski (LPR) | 2 seats 2004-2019 |
| 2009 | Krzysztof Lisek (PO) | Jacek Kurski (PiS) | 2 seats 2004-2019 |
| 2014 | Barbara Kudrycka (PO) | Karol Karski (PiS) | 2 seats 2004-2019 |
| 2019 | Tomasz Frankowski (KE) | Karol Karski (PiS) | Krzysztof Jurgiel (PiS) |
| 2024 | Jacek Protas (KO) | Maciej Wąsik (PiS) | 2 seats since 2024 |

== Election results ==
=== 2004 ===
2004 European Parliament election
| Electoral committee | Votes | % | Seats |
|---|---|---|---|
| Civic Platform | 95,106 | 26.99 | 1 |
| League of Polish Families | 65,926 | 18.71 | 1 |
| Self-Defence of the Republic of Poland | 45,717 | 12.97 | – |
| Law and Justice | 40,412 | 11.47 | – |
| Democratic Left Alliance – Labour Union | 31,120 | 8.83 | – |
| Polish People's Party | 18,796 | 5.33 | – |
| Social Democracy of Poland | 13,308 | 3.78 | – |
| Freedom Union | 12,906 | 3.66 | – |
| National Electoral Committee | 6,371 | 1.81 | – |
| Initiative for Poland | 5,356 | 1.52 | – |
| Real Politics Union | 4,108 | 1.17 | – |
| Konfederacja Ruch Obrony Bezrobotnych | 3,667 | 1.04 | – |
| KPEiR–PLD | 3,364 | 0.95 | – |
| All-Poland Civic Coalition | 3,134 | 0.89 | – |
| Polish Labour Party | 2,368 | 0.67 | – |
| Polish National Party | 772 | 0.22 | – |
| Total | 352,431 | 100.00 | 2 |
| Valid votes | 352,431 | 97.23 | |
| Invalid/blank votes | 10,045 | 2.77 | |
| Total votes | 362,476 | 100.00 | |
| Registered voters/turnout | 2,058,081 | 17.61 | |
Source: PKW

=== 2009 ===
2009 European Parliament election
| Electoral committee | Votes | % | Seats |
|---|---|---|---|
| Civic Platform | 159,943 | 38.31 | 1 |
| Law and Justice | 121,921 | 29.20 | 1 |
| Democratic Left Alliance – Labour Union | 59,194 | 14.18 | – |
| Polish People's Party | 38,012 | 9.11 | – |
| Agreement for the Future – CenterLeft | 8,596 | 2.06 | – |
| Self-Defence of the Republic of Poland | 8,534 | 2.04 | – |
| Right Wing of the Republic | 7,317 | 1.75 | – |
| Real Politics Union | 5,050 | 1.21 | – |
| Libertas Poland | 4,355 | 1.04 | – |
| Polish Labour Party | 3,230 | 0.77 | – |
| Polish Socialist Party | 1,331 | 0.32 | – |
| Total | 417,483 | 100.00 | 2 |
| Valid votes | 417,483 | 98.23 | |
| Invalid/blank votes | 7,521 | 1.77 | |
| Total votes | 425,004 | 100.00 | |
| Registered voters/turnout | 2,104,242 | 20.20 | |
Source: National Electoral Commission

=== 2014 ===
2014 European Parliament election
| Electoral committee | Votes | % | Seats |
|---|---|---|---|
| Law and Justice | 140,342 | 35.53 | 1 |
| Civic Platform | 105,541 | 26.72 | 1 |
| Democratic Left Alliance – Labour Union | 41,422 | 10.49 | – |
| Polish People's Party | 36,221 | 9.17 | – |
| Congress of the New Right | 28,412 | 7.19 | – |
| Europa Plus—Your Movement | 13,330 | 3.37 | – |
| United Poland | 10,209 | 2.58 | – |
| Poland Together | 10,010 | 2.53 | – |
| National Movement | 6,462 | 1.64 | – |
| Direct Democracy | 1,574 | 0.40 | – |
| Self-Defence | 1,517 | 0.38 | – |
| Total | 395,040 | 100.00 | 2 |
| Valid votes | 395,040 | 96.81 | |
| Invalid/blank votes | 13,031 | 3.19 | |
| Total votes | 408,071 | 100.00 | |
| Registered voters/turnout | 2,110,287 | 19.34 | |
Source: National Electoral Commission

=== 2019 ===
2019 European Parliament election
| Electoral committee | Votes | % | Seats |
|---|---|---|---|
| Law and Justice | 375,001 | 47.29 | 2 |
| European Coalition | 293,677 | 37.03 | 1 |
| Spring | 45,424 | 5.73 | – |
| Confederation | 38,866 | 4.90 | – |
| Kukiz'15 | 28,512 | 3.60 | – |
| Lewica Razem | 11,517 | 1.45 | – |
| Total | 792,997 | 100.00 | 3 |
| Valid votes | 792,997 | 99.14 | |
| Invalid/blank votes | 6,849 | 0.86 | |
| Total votes | 799,846 | 100.00 | |
| Registered voters/turnout | 2,054,446 | 38.93 | |
Source: National Electoral Commission

=== 2024 ===
2024 European Parliament election
| Electoral committee | Votes | % | Seats |
|---|---|---|---|
| Civic Coalition | 256,889 | 37.36 | 1 |
| Law and Justice | 252,638 | 36.75 | 1 |
| Confederation | 87,388 | 12.71 | 0 |
| Third Way | 54,087 | 7.87 | 0 |
| The Left | 24,776 | 3.60 | 0 |
| Bezpartyjni Samorządowcy | 6,951 | 1.01 | 0 |
| Normal Country | 3,054 | 0.44 | 0 |
| PolExit | 1,743 | 0.25 | 0 |
| Total | 687,526 | 100.00 | 2 |
| Valid votes | 687,526 | 99.30 | |
| Invalid/blank votes | 4,849 | 0.70 | |
| Total votes | 692,375 | 100.00 | |
| Registered voters/turnout | 1,960,434 | 35.32 | |
Source: National Electoral Commission
