= European Coalition (Poland) =

Liberal electoral alliance in Poland

European Coalition Koalicja Europejska
- Abbreviation: KE
- Leader: Grzegorz Schetyna; Władysław Kosiniak-Kamysz; Włodzimierz Czarzasty; Katarzyna Lubnauer; Marek Kossakowski; Małgorzata Tracz
- Founded: 1 February 2019
- Dissolved: 26 May 2019
- Headquarters: ul. Wiejska 12a, 00-490 Warsaw, Poland
- Ideology: Pro-Europeanism; Liberalism
- Political position: Centre
- European affiliation: EPP/S&D/G-EFA/ALDE
- Colors: Cerulean; Red; Gray; Blue (customary)
- Slogan: 'The future of Poland – the great choice' (Polish: Przyszłość Polski. Wielki Wybór)

Website
- koalicjaeuropejska.pl

The European Coalition (Polish: Koalicja Europejska, KE) was a short-lived electoral alliance and list in Poland. It was established on the verge of 2019 European Parliament election by a group of former prime ministers and former foreign ministers, including Jerzy Buzek, Ewa Kopacz, Grzegorz Schetyna and Radosław Sikorski. They declared the will to construct "one broad list in European Parliament election, the aim of which would be to restore Poland's strong position in the European Union". The Coalition is to be pro-European and centrist.

Parties included in the coalition are the Democratic Left Alliance (since 16 February), The Greens (since 17 February), Now! (since 18 February), Civic Platform (since 21 February), Modern, Democratic Party (since 22 February), Polish People's Party, Union of European Democrats (since 23 February), Social Democracy of Poland (since 2 March), Liberty and Equality (since 3 March), League of Polish Families (since 11 March) and Feminist Initiative (since 15 March).

== History ==
During the campaign, the coalition struggled to compete with the straightforward and simple format and structure of Eurosceptic Law and Justice (PiS) and its campaign. Because of the diverse and conflicting views of the coalition's members, each campaign event of the European Coalition had to include speeches by all leaders of the coalition's members, or their delegates - Grzegorz Schetyna, Władysław Kosiniak-Kamysz, Włodzimierz Czarzasty, Katarzyna Lubnauer i Marek Kossakowski and Małgorzata Tracz. While the messages and speeches of PiS' representatives were aligned with each other, the themes of the KE's convention were contradictory and often referenced broadly different areas. In result, "the cacophony created by the leaders of the five parties incited doubt within the audience regarding the coherence of the programme and the planned forms of its implementation".

The Coalition also gained the support from Barbara Nowacka and her movement, the Polish Initiative and civic organisation Committee for the Defence of Democracy.

The Coalition came in second place in the 2019 European Parliament election with 38.5% of the vote, returning 22 MEPs.

The result was considered disappointing and a defeat for the coalition. Political scientist Magdalena Skorupska found that supporters of the parties that joined the European Coalition were warded off by the conflicting views of its members; for example, supporters of the centre-right agrarian Polish People's Party were dismayed by the presence of left-wing Democratic Left Alliance as well as neoliberal Civic Platform. The KE also alienated non-conservative religious voters by its heavy criticism of the Polish Catholic Church.

Commenting on the coalition's campaign, political scientist Agnieszka Zaręba stated: "The European Coalition acted based on predictable schemas used in all of the previous campaigns. There was a lack of through effort from the campaign team, there was no original instrumentation to ensure the win. There was no attempt at generating new voters. The overall message of the campaign was vague and incohesive." The coalition was also considered to be an attempt of 'americanizing' Polish politics by creating a two-party system. Observers also noted that the coalition was dominated by Civic Platform.

The disappointing results led the agrarian Polish People's Party (PSL) to opt out of the coalition and set up the Polish Coalition instead, which should not include leftist parties.

== Program ==
According to the coalition's declaration, "the goal of the European Coalition is to permanently establish a nationalist but at the same time individual fate of Polish men and women in the West. To ensure the same conditions: privileges and responsibilities, equal standard of living, possibilities for development and security – as available to other European citizens until now".

The main message of the European Coalition was that of promoting Poland as a potential leader of the European Union. The coalition's slogan was “The future of Poland - The great choice”. According to the statements of the coalition's members, Poland was internationally isolated and had to rebuild positive relations with other EU members. The coalition also relied on the premise to match Polish standards of living with that of Western countries which was to be achieved by reinforcing a unified market, common trade agreements and foreign investment. The KE also promoted the European Union as a possibility for young Poles through easier travel and common, EU-wide university programs. The coalition also foresaw a "revolution" in Polish railway transport and telecommunication, fostered by the EU.

The coalition was heavily undermined by highly contradictory of its member parties and vague proposals. In May 2019, one of the coalition's leaders Rafał Grupiński sparked outrage by his response to a question regarding same-sex marriage and adoption of children by same-sex couples. In response, Grupiński stated that the European Coalition would be cautious on LGBT matters as to avoid losing rural and small-town support. The members of the coalition also greatly different in their views towards the euro currency and its possible introduction to Poland.

== Signatories ==
Prominent signatories of the European Coalition's foundation appeal include:

- Marek Belka (SLD), former prime minister (2004–05), former president of the National Bank of Poland (2010–16)
- Jerzy Buzek (PO), former prime minister (1997–2001), former president of the European Parliament (2009–2012)
- Włodzimierz Cimoszewicz (SLD), former prime minister (1996–97), former minister of foreign affairs (2001–05)
- Ewa Kopacz (PO), former prime minister (2014–15), former marshal of the Sejm (2011–14)
- Kazimierz Marcinkiewicz (ex-PiS), former prime minister (2005–06)
- Leszek Miller (SLD), former prime minister (2001–04)
- Adam Daniel Rotfeld, former minister of foreign affairs (2005)
- Grzegorz Schetyna (PO), leader of PO (since 2016), former minister of foreign affairs (2014–15), former marshal of the Sejm (2010–11)
- Radosław Sikorski (PO), former minister of foreign affairs (2007–14), former marshal of the Sejm (2014–15)
- Hanna Suchocka (ex-UD/UW), former prime minister (1992–93)

== Composition ==
The main parties include the following:

Name	Ideology	Position	Leader	MPs (Note: As of 5 April 2019 (unchanged since 13 December 2018). A detailed table of parliamentary group swings in the Lower House can be found on the Polish Wikipedia article regarding the 8th Sejm.)	Senators	MEPs	Entry
Civic Platform	Liberal conservatism	Centre-right	Grzegorz Schetyna	145 / 460	27 / 100	18 / 51	21 February
Modern	Liberalism	Centre to centre-right	Katarzyna Lubnauer	14 / 460	0 / 100	0 / 51	22 February
Democratic Left Alliance	Social democracy Pro-Europeanism	Centre-left	Włodzimierz Czarzasty	0 / 460	0 / 100	3 / 51	16 February
Polish People's Party	Christian democracy	Centre-right to right-wing	Władysław Kosiniak-Kamysz	14 / 460	1 / 100	4 / 51	23 February
The Greens	Green politics	Centre-left to left-wing	Marek Kossakowski; Małgorzata Tracz	0 / 460	0 / 100	0 / 51	17 February

Also affiliated to the coalition include the following:

Name	Ideology	Position	Leader	MPs	Senators	MEPs	Entry
Now!	Liberalism	Centre-right	Ryszard Petru	3 / 460	0 / 100	0 / 51	18 February
Union of European Democrats	Social liberalism	Centre to centre-right	Elżbieta Bińczycka	3 / 460	0 / 100	0 / 51	23 February
Alliance of Democrats	Liberalism	Centre-left	Paweł Piskorski	0 / 460	0 / 100	0 / 51	22 February
Social Democracy of Poland	Social democracy	Centre-left	Wojciech Filemonowicz	0 / 460	1 / 100	0 / 51	2 March
Freedom and Equality	Social democracy Democratic socialism Anti-clericalism	Left-wing	Piotr Musiał	0 / 460	0 / 100	0 / 51	3 March
League of Polish Families	Christian democracy Social conservatism	Right-wing	Witold Bałażak	0 / 460	0 / 100	0 / 51	11 March
Feminist Initiative	Feminism	Centre-left	Collective: Katarzyna Kądziela; Elżbieta Jachlewska; Iwona Piątek	0 / 460	0 / 100	0 / 51	15 March

== Candidates ==
The European Coalition lists in the 13 constituencies are headed by:

- District 1 (Pomeranian): Janusz Lewandowski (PO)
- District 2 (Kuyavian-Pomeranian): Radosław Sikorski (PO)
- District 3 (Podlaskie and Warmian-Masurian): Tomasz Frankowski (PO)
- District 4 (Warsaw): Włodzimierz Cimoszewicz (SLD)
- District 5 (Masovian, except Warsaw): Jarosław Kalinowski (PSL)
- District 6 (Łódź): Marek Belka (SLD)
- District 7 (Greater Poland): Ewa Kopacz (PO)
- District 8 (Lublin): Krzysztof Hetman (PSL)
- District 9 (Podkarpackie): Czesław Siekierski (PSL)
- District 10 (Lesser Poland and Świętokrzyskie): Róża Gräfin von Thun und Hohenstein (PO)
- District 11 (Silesian): Jerzy Buzek (PO)
- District 12 (Lower Silesian and Opole): Janina Ochojska (non-partisan, Polish Humanitarian Action)
- District 13 (Lubusz and West Pomeranian): Bogusław Liberadzki (SLD)

== Results ==
=== European Parliament ===
Year	Leader	# of votes	% of votes	Seats	Place
2019	Grzegorz Schetyna (Note: As the leader of the biggest party of the coalition.)	5,249,935	38.47	22 / 52	2nd

== See also ==
- Confederation KORWiN Braun Liroy Nationalists
- United Right
- Senate Pact 2023
