= Dariusz Lipiński =

Polish politician

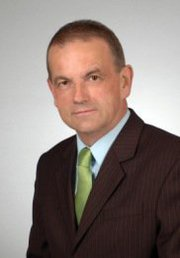
- Polish politician

Member of the Sejm
- Incumbent
- Assumed office 25 September 2005
- Constituency: 39 – Poznań

Personal details
- Born: 4 August 1955 (age 70)
- Party: Civic Platform

Dariusz Tadeusz Lipiński (born 4 August 1955 in Warsaw) is a Polish politician. He was elected to the Sejm on 25 September 2005, getting 4,482 votes in 39 Poznań district as a candidate from the Civic Platform list. In the 2007 parliamentary election he got 20,695 votes and was elected for his second term in the Sejm.

== See also ==
- Members of Polish Sejm 2005-2007
