= Andrzej Mikołaj Dera =

Polish politician (born 1961)

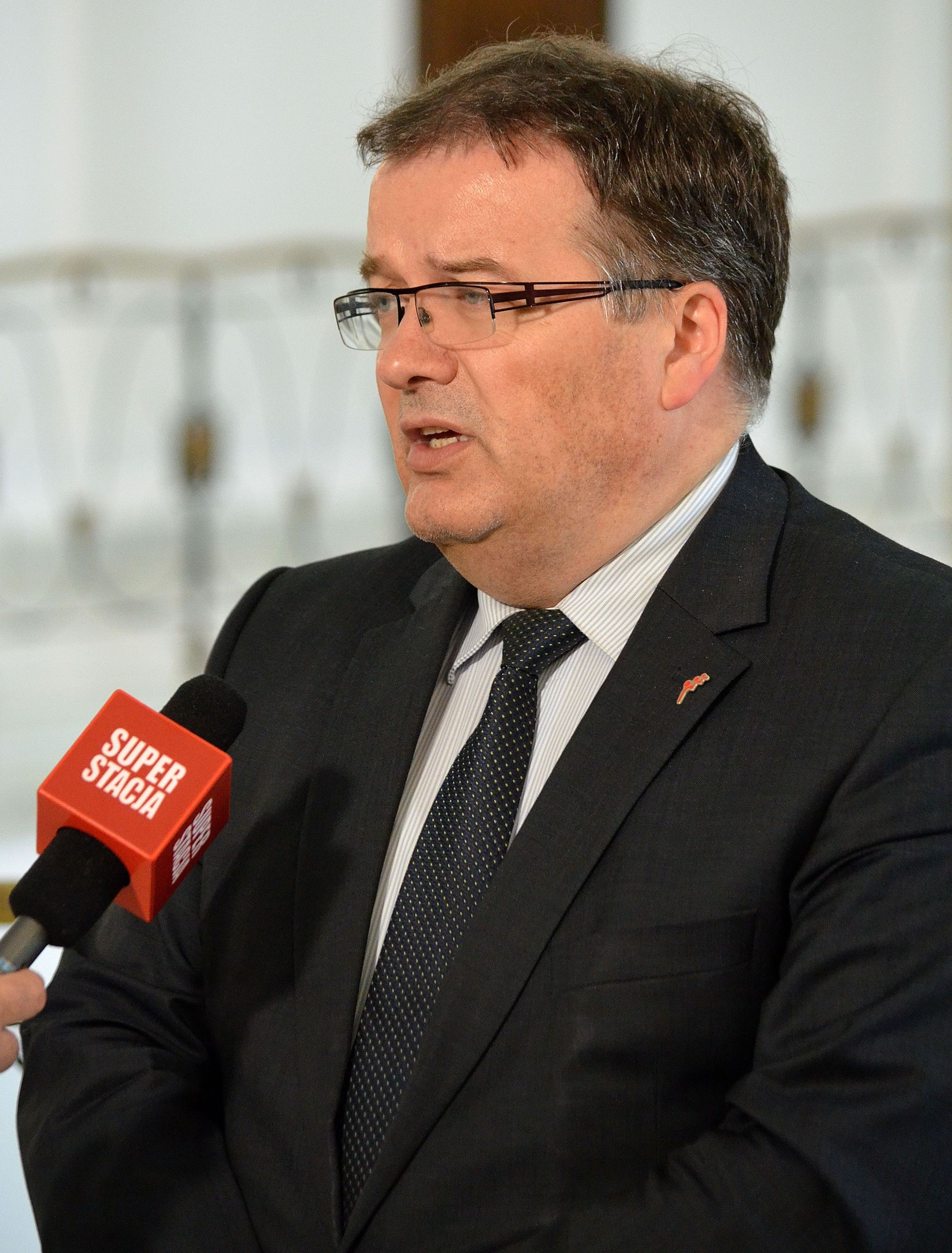

member of Sejm 2005-2007
- Incumbent
- Assumed office 25 September 2005

Personal details
- Born: 10 September 1961 (age 64) Ostrów Wielkopolski
- Party: Law and Justice

Andrzej Mikołaj Dera (born 10 September 1961) is a Polish politician. He was elected to the Sejm on 25 September 2005, getting 7520 votes in 36 Kalisz district as a candidate from Law and Justice list.

== See also ==
- Members of Polish Sejm 2005-2007
