= Freedom and Equality =

Polish political party

Freedom and Equality Wolność i Równość
- Leader: Piotr Musiał
- Founded: 20 March 2005
- Headquarters: ul. Powsińska 40/2, 02-903 Warsaw
- Ideology: Social democracy Social conservatism Historically: Democratic socialism Anti-clericalism; Pro-Europeanism
- Political position: Centre-right; Historically: Left-wing
- National affiliation: Europa Plus (2014); United Left (2015–2016); SLD-The Left Together (2018); European Coalition (2019); WiR-PPS-UP-RLP-SLD alliance (2022); The Left (2023)
- Colours: Yellow and black
- Sejm: 0 / 460
- Senate: 0 / 100

Website
- wir.info.pl

Freedom and Equality (Polish: Wolność i Równość, WiR), previously called Union of the Left (Polish: Unia Lewicy, UL) is a minor social-democratic political party in Poland founded on 20 March 2005 through the union of several left-wing organisations and parties, including: Worker's Democracy, Young Socialists, Antyklerykalna Partia Postępu RACJA, Centrolewica Rzeczypospolitej Polskiej, Demokratyczna Partia Lewicy, Nowa Lewica, Polska Partia Pracy, Polska Partia Socjalistyczna. and Unia Pracy.

The party was supported by the "Democratic Women's Union" (Demokratyczna Unia Kobiet), Polish LGBT rights groups, and several small left-wing organisations. Their current stance on the party remains unknown.

Since the 2023 election, the party has undergone a right-wing shift, adopting more conservative rhetorics on their media channels. In 2024, leader Piotr Musiał claimed on party's social media that DEI policies under the Biden administration were the reason for Donald Trump's victory. In 2025, the party endorsed PiS-backed presidential candidate Karol Nawrocki, with leader Piotr Musiał emphasizing national security, traditional values, and opposition to EU federalization.
