= Marek Siwiec =

Polish politician and journalist

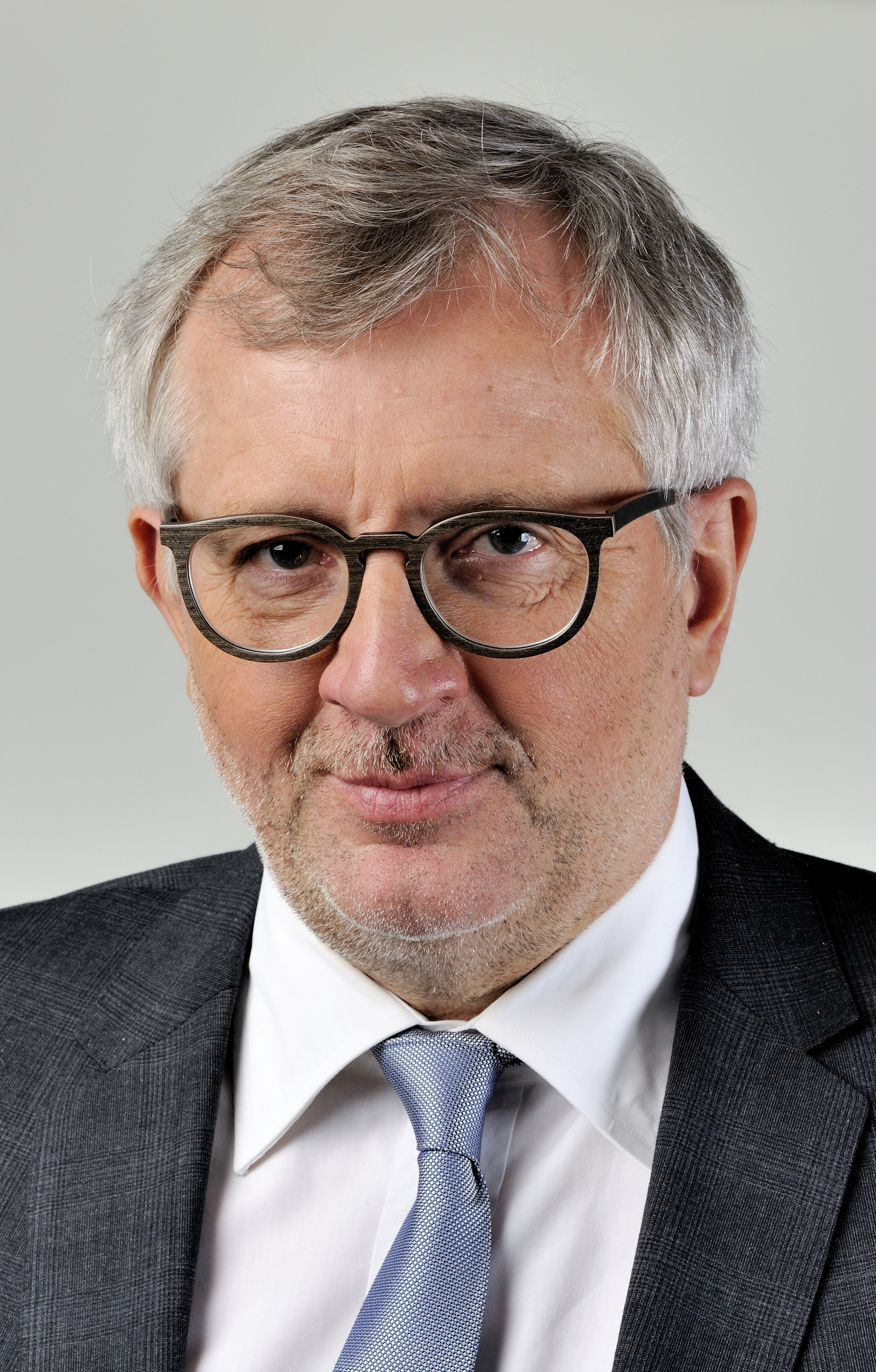
- Siwiec in 2014

Head of the Chancellery of the Sejm
- Incumbent
- Assumed office 24 November 2025
- Marshal: Włodzimierz Czarzasty
- Preceded by: Jacek Cichocki

Vice-President of the European Parliament
- In office 16 January 2007 – 13 July 2009 Serving with thirteen others
- President: Hans-Gert Pöttering

Member of the European Parliament for Greater Poland
- In office 20 July 2004 – 30 June 2014

Head of the National Security Bureau
- In office 19 February 1997 – 17 June 2004
- President: Aleksander Kwaśniewski
- Preceded by: Jerzy Milewski
- Succeeded by: Tadeusz Bałachowicz (acting); Jerzy Bahr

Secretary of State in the Chancellery of the President of Poland
- In office 1996 – 17 June 2004
- President: Aleksander Kwaśniewski

Member of the Sejm
- In office 1991–1997

Personal details
- Born: Marek Maciej Siwiec; 13 March 1955 (age 71) Piekary Śląskie, Stalinogród Voivodeship, Polish People's Republic
- Party: New Left
- Other political affiliations: Democratic Left Alliance (until 2021)

Marek Maciej Siwiec (born 13 March 1955) is a Polish politician and journalist who served as a member of the Sejm from 1991 to 1997 and as a Member of the European Parliament from 2004 to 2014. He was Vice-President of the European Parliament between 2007 and 2009. Within the Chancellery of President Aleksander Kwaśniewski, Siwiec served as Secretary of State from 1996 and as the Head of the National Security Bureau from 1997 to 2004. Since 2025, he has been the Head of the Sejm Chancellery under Marshal Włodzimierz Czarzasty.

== Early life and education ==
Siwiec was born on 13 March 1955 in Piekary Śląskie, Poland. In 1980, he graduated with a master of engineering degree from the Faculty of Elecrtical Engineering, Automatics and Electronics of the AGH University of Kraków.

== Journalism career ==
Between 1985 and 1987 Siwiec was Editor-in-chief of the bi-weekly Student, then the weekly magazine itd (1987–1990) and the daily newspaper Trybuna.

== Political career ==
From 1991 until 1997 Siwiec was a member of the Sejm for the Kalisz Constituency. In the years 1993–1995, he was also a member of the National Broadcasting Council.

In 1996 he was appointed as a secretary of state in the Chancellery of the President of the Republic of Poland, Aleksander Kwaśniewski.

One year later (1997), Siwiec took over as Chief of the National Security Bureau (BBN). He held that position until 2004, when he was elected Member of the European Parliament for the Greater Poland Voivodship.

From January 2007 to June 2009 Siwiec served as Vice-President of the European Parliament. He also chaired the Delegation to the EU-Ukraine Parliamentary Cooperation Committee. He was an observer of several elections in Ukraine between 2004 and 2014.

In December 2011-April 2012 he was the vice-chairman of the Democratic Left Alliance, a Polish social-democratic political party.

During his tenure in the European Parliament Siwiec also served as a coordinator of the Group of the Progressive Alliance of Socialists and Democrats for the Euronest Parliamentary Assembly. He was a member of the Board of Yalta European Strategy foundation, President of European Friends of Israel, and a member of the Global Leadership Council of Colorado State University.

In 2016 Siwiec was appointed as the Chief Executive Officer of Babi Yar Holocaust Memorial Center, a non-governmental organization with its mission to respectfully commemorate the victims of Babi Yar and to promote the humanization of mankind through the memory preservation and study of the history of the Holocaust. Since 2019, he has served as a Senior Public Affairs Advisor for the European Union.

== Career timeline ==
- 1981–1982: Assistant at the Electronics Institute of AGH (1980–1982), traineeship with the Gas and Fuel Corporation of Victoria, Australia
- 1985–1991: Editor-in-chief of the bi-monthly 'Student' (1985–1987), weekly 'ITD' (1987–1990) and the daily 'Trybuna'
- 1991–1997: Member of Parliament of the Polish Republic (Sejm)
- 1993: Spokesman for the Democratic Left Alliance (SLD) Parliamentary Party
- 1993–1996: Member of the National National Broadcasting Council
- 1993–1996: Member of the Parliamentary Assembly of the Council of Europe
- 1996–2004: Secretary of State at the Chancellery of the President of the Republic of Poland
- 1997–2004: Chief of the National Security Bureau (Poland)
- 1997–2004: Vice-Chairman of the Consultative Committee of the presidents of Poland and Ukraine
- Secretary of the National Security Council (2000–2004) head of the Polish Association of Friends of the Peres Center for Peace
- Chairman of the Supervisory Board of the Foundation to Counter Terrorism and Biological Threats
- Member of the National Administration of the SLD
- Head of the national delegation to the Party of European Socialists in the EP

== Awards and recognition ==
- Order of Gedymin (1997, LT), Cavaliere di Gran Croce (1997, I), Ordem do Merito (1997, P), Ordre de Leopold (1999, B)
- National Order of Merit (2000, F)
- Ubique Patriae Memor (2002, BR)
- Grand Cross of the Order of Merit (2003, LT)
- Virtutea Militară (2003, RO)
- Royal Victorian Order (2004, GB)
- Order of Prince Yaroslav the Wise, 4th and 3rd Class (1997, 2004, UA)

== Controversy ==
During the 2000 Polish presidential election, a film was published revealing Siwiec, then the chief of the BBN, allegedly parodying a gesture of Pope John Paul II (making a cross sign in the air on arrival). In November 2007, the Institute of National Remembrance (IPN; a commission for the prosecution of crimes against the Polish nation), revealed that in 1986 he was registered as an unofficial collaborator until January 1990. Marek Siwiec denied those claims. After concluding its own investigation, on 26 March 2009 the IPN, decided to discontinue the proceedings due to a lack of evidence about collaboration.

== See also ==
- 2004 European Parliament election in Poland
- 2009 European Parliament election in Poland
