= Elżbieta Łukacijewska =

Polish politician (born 1966)

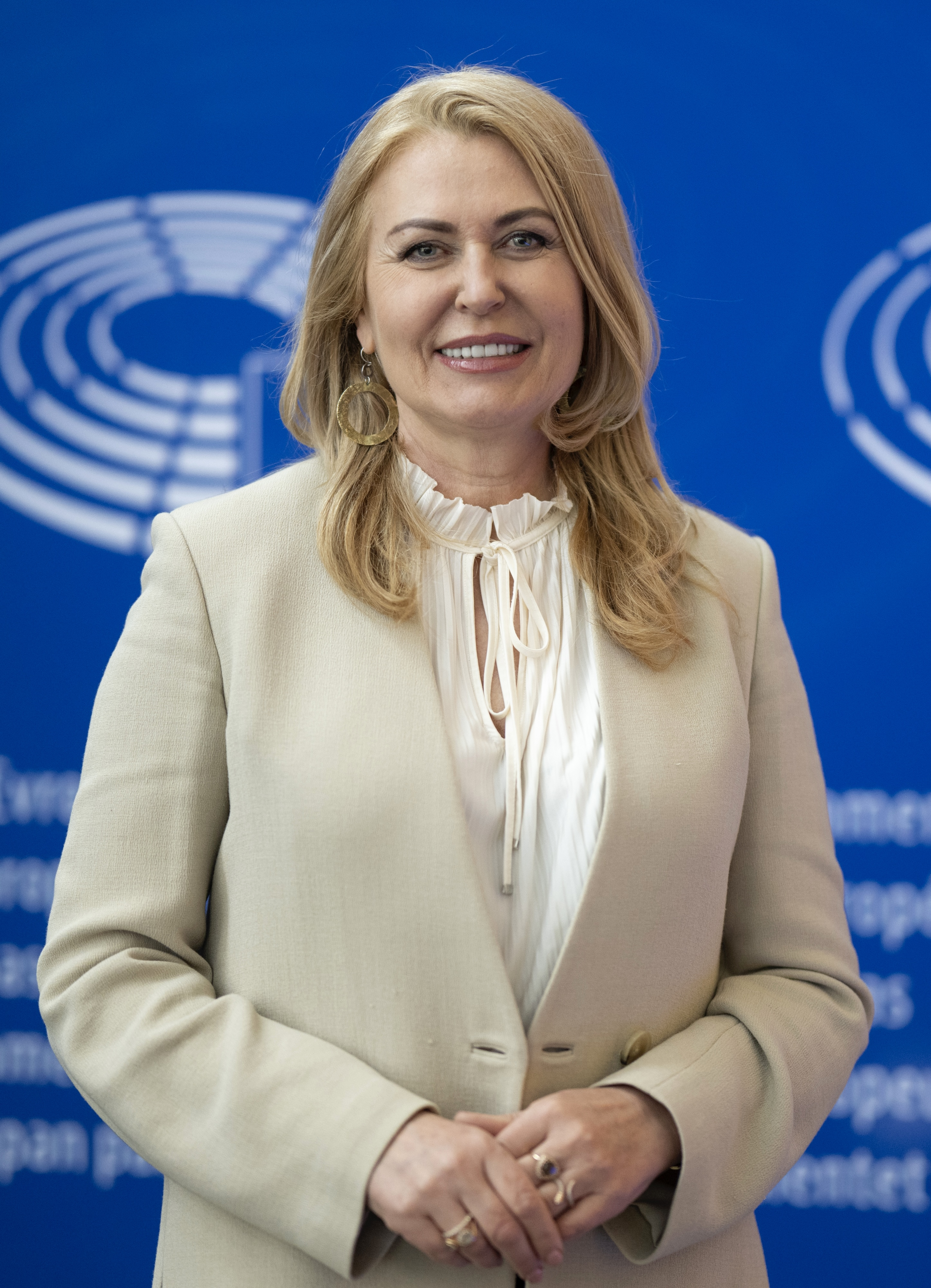

Member of the European Parliament for Poland
- Incumbent
- Assumed office 14 July 2009

Member of the Sejm
- In office 23 September 2001 – 12 July 2009

Personal details
- Born: 25 November 1966 (age 59) Jasło
- Party: Civic Platform

Video Statement (English) / (polish)

Elżbieta Katarzyna Łukacijewska ([ɛlʐˈbjɛta wukat͡ɕiˈjɛfska]; born 25 November 1966) is a Polish politician who has been serving as a Member of the European Parliament since 2009.

== Political career ==
From 2001 until 2005, Łukacijewska was a member of Sejm. She was again elected to the Sejm on 25 September 2005, getting 14,166 votes in 22 Krosno district as a candidate from the Civic Platform list.

Łukacijewska was elected in 2009 as a Member of the European Parliament (MEP), and re-elected in 2014 and 2019. In parliament, she serves on the Committee on Transport and Tourism and the Committee on Women's Rights and Gender Equality. In addition to her committee assignments, she is part of the Parliament's delegation to the ACP–EU Joint Parliamentary Assembly.

== Other activities ==
- European Logistics Platform, Member of the Advisory Board

== See also ==
- Members of Polish Sejm 2005–2007
