= Zdzisław Krasnodębski (sociologist) =

Polish sociologist, philosopher, publicist and professor (born 1953)

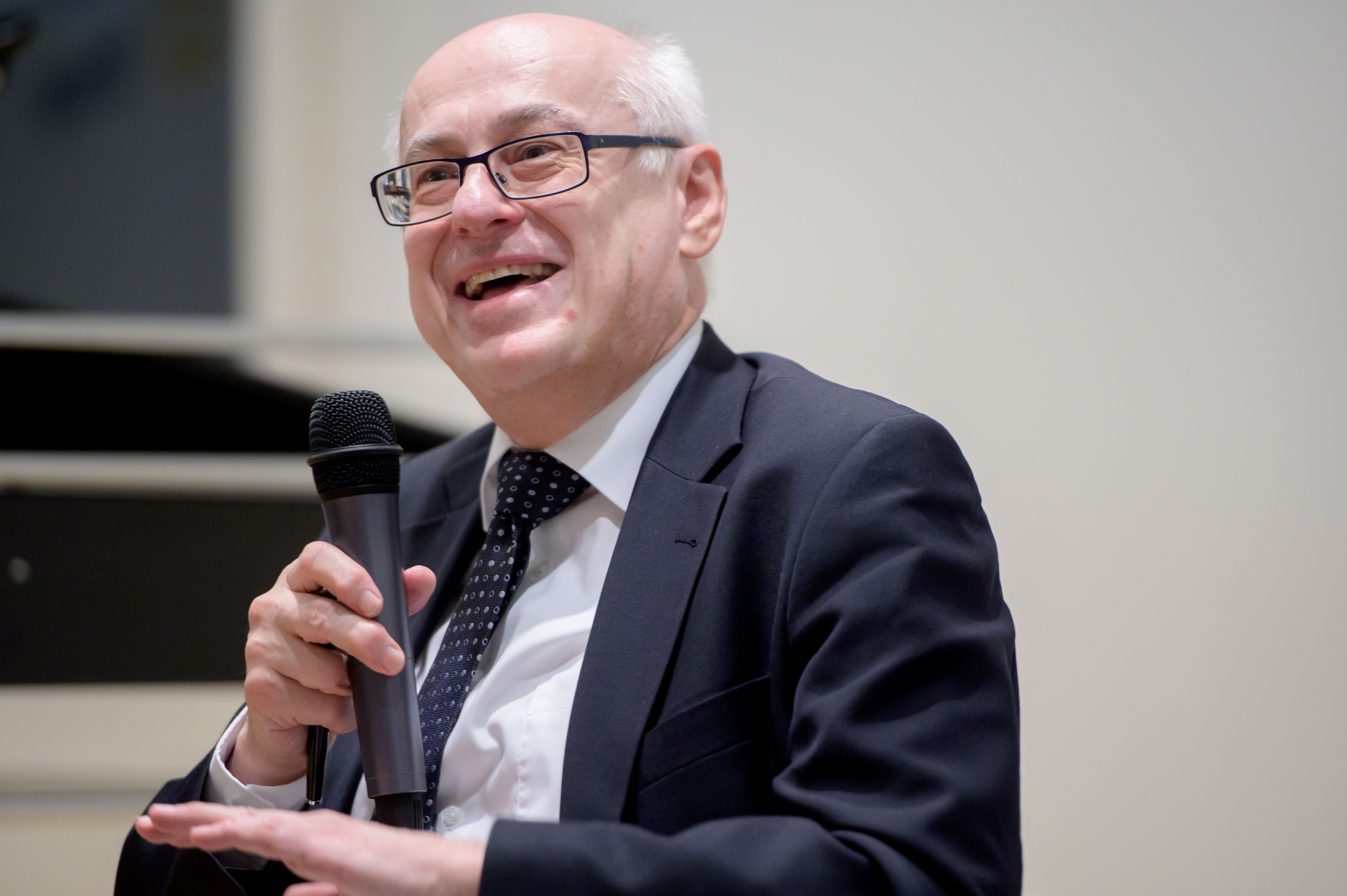
- Krasnodębski in 2019

Member of the European Parliament
- Incumbent
- Assumed office 1 July 2014

Personal details
- Born: 11 April 1953 (age 73) Choszczno, Poland
- Party: Law and Justice
- Spouse: Anna Krasnodębska
- Education: University of Warsaw
- Occupation: Sociologist, social philosopher, politician,
- Website: zdzislawkrasnodebski.eu

Zdzisław Marek Krasnodębski (born 11 April 1953 in Choszczno, Poland) is a Polish sociologist, social philosopher, publicist and professor at the University of Bremen (Germany), who has been a Member of the European Parliament since the 2014 election.

== Biography ==
He finished Piotr Skarga High School in Grójec (1972). In 1976 he graduated from the Faculty of Philosophy and Sociology at the University of Warsaw and in 1981 from the Ruhr -Universität Bochum. In 1984 he obtained a PhD at the University of Warsaw, and in 1991 at the same university he earned a post-doctoral degree (doctor habil.) with a thesis entitled: The Fall of the idea of progress.

Between 1976 and 1991 he taught sociology, social theory and philosophy at the University of Warsaw. From 1991 to 1992 he was a professor at the University of Kassel. In 1992 he settled in Germany. In 1995 he was appointed professor at the University of Bremen. In the years 2001-2011 he was also an associate professor at the Cardinal Stefan Wyszyński University in Warsaw. He also taught, among others, at the Catholic University of America, Columbia University. He also gave visiting lectures at numerous universities e.g. Princeton University, University of Oxford and University of Cambridge. He is also an associate professor at the Akademia Ignatianum in Cracow.

Appointed to the committee the Sociology of the Polish Academy of Sciences (1999-2006), Scientific Council of the Helmuth Plessner - Gesellschaft, the jury of Hannah Arendt Prize (2003-2007), Scientific Council of the Polish Institute of International Affairs (2007-2010), as well as chairman of the Foundation for Polish-German Cooperation. He is also a chairman of the chapter of Lech Kaczynski's Prize.

As a publicist he cooperated or cooperates with the monthly journal "Znak", Rzeczpospolita newspaper, Gazeta Polska, Dziennik (including appendix – Europa) and the weekly journal – wSieci.

In 2005 he became a member of the Honorary Committee supporting Lech Kaczynski in the presidential elections in Poland. Between 2007 and 2009 he was a member of the Public Service Council to the Prime Minister. In 2014 he became a member of the Program Board of Law and Justice party (Prawo i Sprawiedliwość).

In the same year in the elections to the European Parliament he started from a list of the Law and Justice in district 4 - Warsaw and received a mandate of the Member of the European Parliament of the eighth term, receiving 96,292 votes. He was a Vice President of the European Parliament. He is a member of the Working Group on the Conference on the Future of Europe.
