= Europa Plus (Poland) =

Centre-left coalition of parties in Poland

- Leader: Aleksander Kwasniewski; Janusz Palikot; Marek Siwiec
- Founded: 3 February 2013
- Dissolved: 29 May 2014
- Headquarters: ul. Nowy Świat 39; 00-029 Warsaw
- Ideology: Social liberalism Social democracy Progressivism; Pro-Europeanism
- Political position: Centre-left
- Colours: Orange; Blue
- Members: Your Movement; Democratic Party – demokraci.pl Alliance of Democrats; Reason Party; Polish Labour Party; Former: Labour United; Social Democracy of Poland; Union of the Left

Website
- europaplus.org.pl

Europa Plus, formally Europa Plus Social Movement (Polish: Ruch Społeczny Europa Plus), was a pro-European centre-left coalition of parties in Poland, formed to contest the 2014 European Parliament election. The alliance described itself as a "modern centre-left formation".

The coalition was founded on 3 February 2013 by the Palikot's Movement, Social Democracy of Poland, Labour United, the Union of the Left and the Reason Party. The project was led by Marek Siwiec (a former Vice President of the Democratic Left Alliance and then-current MEP), Aleksander Kwasniewski (a former President of Poland and member of the Democratic Left Alliance) and Janusz Palikot. However, on 15 June 2013, Labour United congress instead stated it would continue its previous coalition with the Democratic Left Alliance. The Democratic Party – demokraci.pl later joined the alliance on 24 June 2013. Other parties listed in the alliance's website are the Democratic Party and the Polish Labour Party. The alliance's programme supported the introduction of the Euro to Poland by January 2019, a new system of health care in Poland and free Internet access for Polish citizens. On 6 October 2013, Palikot's Movement was reorganised into Your Movement. On 7 February 2014, the Union of the Left and Social Democracy of Poland exited the alliance.

In the 2014 European election, Europa Plus received 3.58% of the vote, below the 5% threshold to elect any MEPs. On 29 May 2014, it was announced that the alliance had been disbanded.
