= National Electoral Commission (Poland) =

Highest electoral body in Poland

- Polish: Państwowa Komisja Wyborcza

Agency overview
- Type: Electoral commission
- Jurisdiction: Poland
- Status: Active
- Headquarters: Wiejska 10, 00-902, Warsaw, Poland; 52.225940°N 21.026000°E
- Website: pkw.gov.pl

The National Electoral Commission (Polish: Państwowa Komisja Wyborcza, PKW) is Poland's permanent national election commission. The country's other permanent electoral bodies are 51 election commissioners (Polish: komisarze wyborczy; singular: komisarz wyborczy).

The PKW consists of 9 people:

- a judge of the Constitutional Tribunal, appointed by the president of the Constitutional Tribunal;
- a judge of the Supreme Administrative Court, appointed by the president of the Supreme Administrative Court;
- 7 persons qualified to hold the post of judge, indicated by the Sejm. The term of office of members of the National Electoral Commission, who are judges appointed by the presidents of the Constitutional Tribunal and Supreme Administrative Court, is 9 years.

Members do not serve a fixed term; their membership ends when they reach the age of 70.

The PKW is the supreme electoral commission in Poland. It has one chairman and two vice chairmen. The commission is chaired by Sylwester Marciniak, with Wojciech Sych and Konrad Składowski serving as deputy chairs. PKW organises all elections in Poland:

- election of the President of the Republic of Poland;
- elections to Sejm and Senat (lower and upper houses of the Parliament);
- local elections (to gminas/city/powiats councils, for wójt/burmistrz (mayor) and president of the city and sejmiki wojewódzkie (voivodeships councils; sejmik literally means small Sejm));
- elections to the European Parliament in Poland;
- national and local referendums

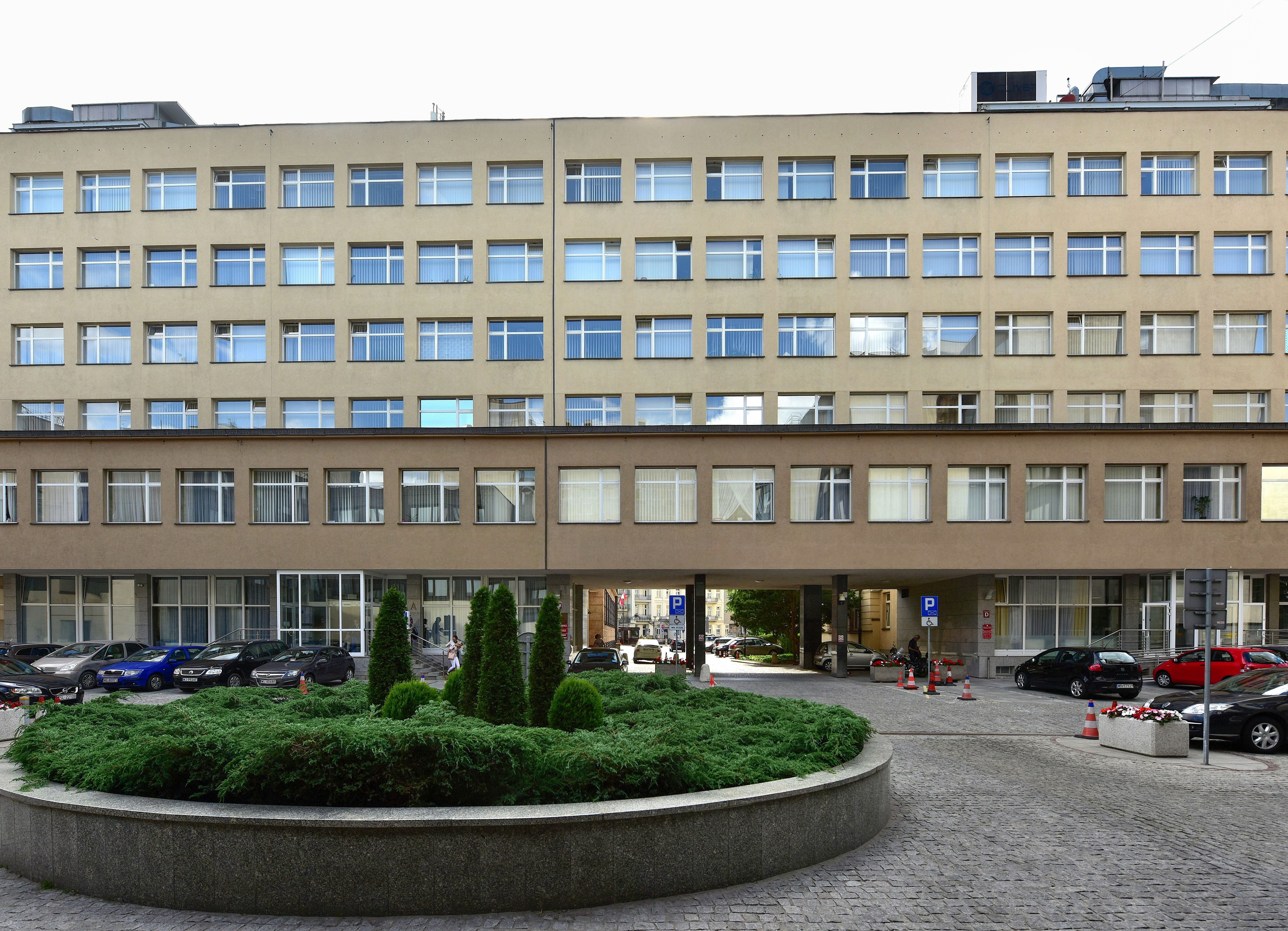
Commission Headquarters in Warsaw

The PKW appoints Okręgowe Komisje Wyborcze (OKW) (District Electoral Commissions) in elections of President, Sejm and Senat and European Parliament elections. In contrast to PKW, OKW are temporary.

In local elections the terytorialne komisje wyborcze (territorial electoral commissions) are created by the komisarz wyborczy. Each territorial electoral commission conducts elections to appropriate organs:

- wojewódzka komisja wyborcza (voivodeship electoral commission) conduct elections to the sejmik województwa;
- powiatowa komisja wyborcza (powiat electoral commission) conducts elections to the rada powiatu (powiat council);
- gminna komisja wyborcza (commune electoral commission) conducts elections to the rada gminy (commune council) and wójt (mayor of the rural commune);
- miejska komisja wyborcza (city electoral commission) conducts elections to the rada miasta (city council) and burmistrz/prezydent miasta.

All territorial electoral commissions are also temporary, in contrast to the election commissioners.
