= Right Wing of the Republic =

Right Wing of the Republic Prawica Rzeczypospolitej
- Leader: Krzysztof Kawęcki
- Founder: Marek Jurek
- Founded: 20 April 2007
- Split from: Law and Justice
- Headquarters: ul. Wspólna 61/105, Warsaw
- Ideology: National conservatism Social conservatism Ordoliberalism; Euroscepticism; Polish nationalism
- Political position: Right-wing
- European affiliation: European Christian Political Party
- European Parliament group: European Conservatives and Reformists Group
- Colours: Blue, Red
- Sejm: 0 / 460 (0%)
- Senate: 0 / 100 (0%)
- European Parliament: 0 / 53 (0%)
- Regional assemblies: 1 / 555

Website
- prawicarzeczypospolitej.org

The Right Wing of the Republic (Polish: Prawica Rzeczypospolitej) is a political party in Poland founded by former Marshal of the Sejm Marek Jurek on 20 April 2007 after he had left Law and Justice on 16 April 2007, when the Sejm failed to pass a constitutional amendment outlawing abortion. The party positions itself as a Christian conservative party with a strong focus on family rights and an anti-abortion stance.

== Political program ==
The program of the Right Wing of the Republic includes:

- Constitutional prohibition of abortion.
- Prohibiting prostitution and pornography.
- Public combat against "cultural Marxism" and "gender ideology".
- Restoration of capital punishment for homicide and rape.
- Tax concessions for families and expanded pro-family policy.
- Privatization of some state-owned companies (excluding strategic energy and mining industries).
- Longer maternity leave.
- Reinforcement public health care.
- Opposition to joining euro zone.
- Reduced government spending.
- Labor law liberalization.
- Holidays on Sunday and other religious festivities.
- Introduction of Demeny voting

== Former Sejm members ==
- Marek Jurek
- Małgorzata Bartyzel
- Marian Piłka
- Lucyna Wiśniewska
- Dariusz Kłeczek
- Artur Zawisza
- Jan Klawiter

== Former Senat members ==
- Adam Biela
- Mieczysław Maziarz

== Former European Parliament members ==
- Marek Jurek

== Election results ==
=== Sejm ===
Election year	# of votes	% of vote	# of overall seats won	+/–	Government
2011	35,169	0.24	0 / 460	-	Extra-parliamentary
2015	5,711,687	37.6 (#1) with Law and Justice	1 / 460 *	▲1	Government
2019	1,765	0.01	0 / 460	▼1	Extra-parliamentary

*Only 217 of those were actually from the party. 9 of the elected were members of Solidarity for Poland, 8 were members of Poland Together and Jan Klawiter was a member of Right Wing of the Republic. Under an agreement between the two parties he is an independent in the Sejm (not affiliated to any parliamentary faction).

== See also ==
- Law and Justice
