= Results breakdown of the 2024 European Parliament election in Poland =

Breakdown of election results

This is the results breakdown of the election held in Poland as part of the 2024 European Parliament election on 9 June 2024. The following tables show detailed results by each party in electoral coalitions, as well as constituency results.

== Nationwide ==
Results of the 2024 European parliament election in Poland by voivodeships

Results of the 2024 European Parliament election in Poland by powiats

Results of the 2024 European Parliament election in Poland by gminas

Party or alliance		Votes	%	Seats	+/–
Civic Coalition	Civic Platform	3,535,260	30.06	17	+5
Civic Coalition	Polish Initiative	194,109	1.65	1	New
Civic Coalition	The Greens	39,473	0.34	0	0
Civic Coalition	Modern	7,813	0.07	0	0
Civic Coalition	Independents	582,788	4.95	3	+1
Civic Coalition	Total	4,359,443	37.06	21	+7
United Right	Law and Justice	3,575,523	30.40	18	–3
United Right	Sovereign Poland	575,261	4.89	2	+1
United Right	Independents	102,385	0.87	0	–4
United Right	Total	4,253,169	36.16	20	–7
Confederation	Confederation	375,140	3.19	3	New
Confederation	New Hope	328,388	2.79	2	New
Confederation	Confederation of the Polish Crown	302,317	2.57	1	New
Confederation	National Movement	166,064	1.41	0	0
Confederation	Real Europe Movement – Europa Christi	58,638	0.50	0	New
Confederation	Wolnościowcy	49,504	0.42	0	New
Confederation	There is One Poland	38,226	0.33	0	New
Confederation	Independents	102,010	0.87	0	0
Confederation	Total	1,420,287	12.08	6	+6
Third Way	Polish People's Party	366,901	3.12	2	–1
Third Way	Poland 2050	306,298	2.60	1	New
Third Way	Union of European Democrats	19,490	0.17	0	0
Third Way	Centre for Poland	10,494	0.09	0	New
Third Way	Wolnościowcy	6,898	0.06	0	New
Third Way	Silesian Regional Party	2,130	0.02	0	New
Third Way	Independents	101,027	0.86	0	New
Third Way	Total	813,238	6.91	3	0
The Left	New Left	458,190	3.90	3	–5
The Left	Left Together	140,190	1.19	0	0
The Left	Labour Union	632	0.01	0	0
The Left	Independents	142,059	1.21	0	0
The Left	Total	741,071	6.30	3	–5
Bezpartyjni Samorządowcy	KORWiN	4,343	0.04	0	New
Bezpartyjni Samorządowcy	Bezpartyjni Samorządowcy	3,977	0.03	0	New
Bezpartyjni Samorządowcy	Nonpartisans	1,337	0.01	0	New
Bezpartyjni Samorządowcy	New Hope (Note: Dominika Korwin-Mikke ran as an individual New Hope member on Bezpartyjni Samorządowcy list.)	604	0.01	0	New
Bezpartyjni Samorządowcy	Social Alternative	522	0.00	0	New
Bezpartyjni Samorządowcy	New Democracy - Yes	375	0.00	0	New
Bezpartyjni Samorządowcy	Independents	97,768	0.83	0	New
Bezpartyjni Samorządowcy	Total	108,926	0.93	0	New
PolExit	Congress of the New Right	6,659	0.06	0	0
PolExit	PolExit	3,608	0.03	0	New
PolExit	Federation for the Republic	1,132	0.01	0	New
PolExit	There is One Poland (Note: Jan Pietraga ran as an individual There is One Poland member on PolExit list.)	146	0.00	0	New
PolExit	Independents	17,650	0.15	0	0
PolExit	Total	29,195	0.25	0	0
Normal Country	Normal Country	4,922	0.04	0	New
Normal Country	Silesians Together	1,203	0.01	0	New
Normal Country	New Hope (Note: Patryk Olęncki ran as an individual New Hope member on Normal Country list.)	305	0.00	0	New
Normal Country	Independents	13,709	0.12	0	New
Normal Country	Total	20,308	0.17	0	New
Liberal Poland – Entrepreneurs' Strike	Liberal Poland – Entrepreneurs' Strike	4,208	0.04	0	New
Liberal Poland – Entrepreneurs' Strike	Independents	5,245	0.04	0	New
Liberal Poland – Entrepreneurs' Strike	Total	9,453	0.08	0	New
Repair Poland Movement	Self-Defence	260	0.00	0	New
Repair Poland Movement	Repair Poland Movement	253	0.00	0	0
Repair Poland Movement	Independents	4,224	0.04	0	0
Repair Poland Movement	Total	4,737	0.04	0	0
Voice of Strong Poland	Independents	2,167	0.02	0	New
Total		11,761,825	100.00	53	+1
Valid votes		11,761,825	99.43		
Invalid/blank votes		67,731	0.57		
Total votes		11,829,556	100.00		
Registered voters/turnout		29,098,155	40.65		
Source: PKW

=== Distribution by constituencies ===
Distribution of seats for each party by constituencies according to largest remainder method.

Constituency	Civic Coalition				Law and Justice				Confederation				Third Way				The Left			
Constituency	Votes	Ent	Rem	S	Votes	Ent	Rem	S	Votes	Ent	Rem	S	Votes	Ent	Rem	S	Votes	Ent	Rem	S
1 (Pomeranian)	379,577	1.828	0.828	2	208,676	0.981	0.981	1	69,654	0.294	0.294	0	40,139	0.148	0.148	0	34,570	0.140	0.140	0
2 (Kuyavian-Pomeranian)	241,737	1.164	0.164	1	170,474	0.802	0.802	1	55,789	0.236	0.236	0	43,482	0.160	0.160	0	25,660	0.104	0.104	0
3 (Podlaskie and Warmian–Masurian)	256,889	1.237	0.237	1	252,638	1.188	0.188	1	87,388	0.369	0.369	0	54,087	0.200	0.200	0	24,776	0.100	0.100	0
4 (Warsaw)	579,994	2.794	0.794	3	323,868	1.523	0.523	2	156,067	0.659	0.659	1	92,111	0.340	0.340	1	135,755	0.550	0.550	1
5 (Masovian)	171,044	0.824	0.824	1	353,247	1.661	0.661	2	92,949	0.393	0.393	0	65,399	0.241	0.241	0	23,383	0.095	0.095	0
6 (Łódź)	252,318	1.215	0.215	1	292,596	1.376	0.376	1	83,098	0.351	0.351	0	44,780	0.165	0.165	0	75,285	0.305	0.305	0
7 (Greater Poland)	399,299	1.923	0.923	2	297,286	1.398	0.398	1	135,416	0.572	0.572	1	94,951	0.350	0.350	1	82,845	0.335	0.335	1
8 (Lublin)	161,002	0.776	0.776	1	292,019	1.373	0.373	1	93,542	0.395	0.395	0	43,013	0.159	0.159	0	20,381	0.083	0.083	0
9 (Subcarpathian)	150,131	0.723	0.723	1	334,439	1.573	0.573	2	96,376	0.407	0.407	1	29,767	0.110	0.110	0	13,082	0.053	0.053	0
10 (Lesser Poland and Świętokrzyskie)	401,371	1.933	0.933	2	655,777	3.084	0.084	3	210,553	0.889	0.889	1	131,106	0.484	0.484	1	70,403	0.285	0.285	0
11 (Silesian)	551,782	2.658	0.658	3	485,505	2.283	0.283	2	135,195	0.571	0.571	1	74,125	0.273	0.273	0	61,653	0.250	0.250	0
12 (Lower Silesian and Opole)	476,479	2.295	0.295	2	360,558	1.695	0.695	2	134,122	0.567	0.567	1	56,088	0.207	0.207	0	101,362	0.410	0.410	1
13 (Lubusz and West Pomeranian)	337,820	1.627	0.627	1	226,086	1.063	0.063	1	70,138	0.296	0.296	0	44,190	0.163	0.163	0	71,916	0.291	0.291	0
Total	4,359,443	13*	8	21	4,253,169	14*	6	20	1,420,287	0*	6	6	813,238	0*	3	3	741,071	0*	3	3
Divisor	0.657				0.522				0.406				0.339				0.334			

Remainders marked by italic represent largest remainders. Total entitlements (with *) indicate sum of whole (integer) parts of entitlements.

== Constituencies ==
=== 1st constituency (Pomeranian) ===
Electoral committee	Votes	%	Seats
Civic Coalition	379,577	50.97	2
Law and Justice	208,676	28.02	1
Confederation	69,654	9.35	0
Third Way	40,139	5.39	0
The Left	34,570	4.64	0
Bezpartyjni Samorządowcy	8,389	1.13	0
PolExit	3,727	0.50	0
Total	744,732	100.00	3
Valid votes	744,732	99.16	
Invalid/blank votes	6,327	0.84	
Total votes	751,059	100.00	
Registered voters/turnout	1,753,592	42.83	
Source: National Electoral Commission

Elected candidates
List	Name	Party	Group	# of votes	% of votes
Civic Coalition	Magdalena Adamowicz	Independent	EPP	204,207	27.47
Civic Coalition	Janusz Lewandowski	Civic Platform	EPP	133,444	17.95
Law and Justice	Piotr Müller	Law and Justice	ECR	62,330	8.38

=== 2nd constituency (Kuyavian-Pomeranian) ===
Electoral committee	Votes	%	Seats
Civic Coalition	241,737	44.38	1
Law and Justice	170,474	31.30	1
Confederation	55,789	10.24	0
Third Way	43,482	7.98	0
The Left	25,660	4.71	0
Bezpartyjni Samorządowcy	4,747	0.87	0
PolExit	1,480	0.27	0
Liberal Poland – Entrepreneurs' Strike	1,309	0.24	0
Total	544,678	100.00	2
Valid votes	544,678	99.33	
Invalid/blank votes	3,650	0.67	
Total votes	548,328	100.00	
Registered voters/turnout	1,530,806	35.82	
Source: National Electoral Commission

Elected candidates
List	Name	Party	Group	# of votes	% of votes
Civic Coalition	Krzysztof Brejza	Civic Platform	EPP	205,200	37.67
Law and Justice	Kosma Złotowski	Law and Justice	ECR	61,463	11.28

=== 3rd constituency (Podlaskie and Warmian–Masurian) ===
Electoral committee	Votes	%	Seats
Civic Coalition	256,889	37.36	1
Law and Justice	252,638	36.75	1
Confederation	87,388	12.71	0
Third Way	54,087	7.87	0
The Left	24,776	3.60	0
Bezpartyjni Samorządowcy	6,951	1.01	0
Normal Country	3,054	0.44	0
PolEXIT	1,743	0.25	0
Total	687,526	100.00	2
Valid votes	687,526	99.30	
Invalid/blank votes	4,849	0.70	
Total votes	692,375	100.00	
Registered voters/turnout	1,960,434	35.32	
Source: National Electoral Commission

Elected candidates
List	Name	Party	Group	# of votes	% of votes
Civic Coalition	Jacek Protas	Civic Platform	EPP	125,861	18.31
Law and Justice	Maciej Wąsik	Law and Justice	ECR	85,151	12.39

=== 4th constituency (Warsaw) ===
Electoral committee	Votes	%	Seats
Civic Coalition	579,994	44.46	3
Law and Justice	323,868	24.82	2
Confederation	156,067	11.96	1
The Left	135,755	10.41	1
Third Way	92,111	7.06	1
Bezpartyjni Samorządowcy	13,797	1.06	0
PolExit	3,046	0.23	0
Total	1,304,638	100.00	8
Valid votes	1,304,638	99.61	
Invalid/blank votes	5,161	0.39	
Total votes	1,309,799	100.00	
Registered voters/turnout	2,326,513	56.30	
Source: National Electoral Commission

Elected candidates
List	Name	Party	Group	# of votes	% of votes
Civic Coalition	Marcin Kierwiński	Civic Platform	EPP	143,179	10.97
Civic Coalition	Kamila Gasiuk-Pihowicz	Civic Platform	EPP	136,811	10.49
Civic Coalition	Michał Szczerba	Civic Platform	EPP	120,667	9.25
Law and Justice	Małgorzata Gosiewska	Law and Justice	ECR	99,286	7.61
Law and Justice	Tobiasz Bocheński	Law and Justice	ECR	95,880	7.35
Confederation	Ewa Zajączkowska-Hernik	New Hope	ESN	102,569	7.86
The Left	Robert Biedroń	New Left	S&D	65,869	5.05
Third Way	Michał Kobosko	Poland 2050	RE	39,170	3.00

=== 5th constituency (Masovian) ===
Electoral committee	Votes	%	Seats
Law and Justice	353,247	49.17	2
Civic Coalition	171,044	23.81	1
Confederation	92,949	12.94	0
Third Way	65,399	9.10	0
The Left	23,383	3.25	0
Bezpartyjni Samorządowcy	5,000	0.70	0
Voice of Strong Poland	2,167	0.30	0
Normal Country	1,596	0.22	0
PolExit	1,447	0.20	0
Repair Poland Movement	1,426	0.20	0
Liberal Poland – Entrepreneurs' Strike	733	0.10	0
Total	718,391	100.00	3
Valid votes	718,391	99.37	
Invalid/blank votes	4,589	0.63	
Total votes	722,980	100.00	
Registered voters/turnout	1,906,952	37.91	
Source: National Electoral Commission

Elected candidates
List	Name	Party	Group	# of votes	% of votes
Law and Justice	Adam Bielan	Law and Justice	ECR	90,690	12.62
Law and Justice	Jacek Ozdoba	Sovering Poland	ECR	54,327	7.56
Civic Coalition	Andrzej Halicki	Civic Platform	EPP	129,401	18.01

=== 6th constituency (Łódź) ===
Electoral committee	Votes	%	Seats
Law and Justice	292,596	38.60	1
Civic Coalition	252,318	33.29	1
Confederation	83,098	10.96	0
The Left	75,285	9.93	0
Third Way	44,780	5.91	0
Bezpartyjni Samorządowcy	6,318	0.83	0
PolExit	1,868	0.25	0
Liberal Poland – Entrepreneurs' Strike	1,699	0.22	0
Total	757,962	100.00	2
Valid votes	757,962	99.45	
Invalid/blank votes	4,217	0.55	
Total votes	762,179	100.00	
Registered voters/turnout	1,854,108	41.11	
Source: National Electoral Commission

Elected candidates
List	Name	Party	Group	# of votes	% of votes
Law and Justice	Waldemar Buda	Law and Justice	ECR	103,679	13.68
Civic Coalition	Dariusz Joński	Polish Initiative	EPP	194,109	25.61

=== 7th constituency (Greater Poland) ===
Electoral committee	Votes	%	Seats
Civic Coalition	399,299	38.85	2
Law and Justice	297,286	28.92	1
Confederation	135,416	13.18	1
Third Way	94,951	9.24	1
The Left	82,845	8.06	1
Bezpartyjni Samorządowcy	7,761	0.76	0
Normal Country	5,460	0.53	0
Liberal Poland – Entrepreneurs' Strike	2,437	0.24	0
PolExit	2,366	0.23	0
Total	1,027,821	100.00	6
Valid votes	1,027,821	99.32	
Invalid/blank votes	7,036	0.68	
Total votes	1,034,857	100.00	
Registered voters/turnout	2,642,860	39.16	
Source: National Electoral Commission

Elected candidates
List	Name	Party	Group	# of votes	% of votes
Civic Coalition	Ewa Kopacz	Civic Platform	EPP	187,866	18.28
Civic Coalition	Michał Wawrykiewicz	Independent	EPP	119,068	11.58
Law and Justice	Marlena Maląg	Law and Justice	ECR	115,670	11.25
Confederation	Anna Bryłka	Confederation	NI	111,420	10.84
Third Way	Krzysztof Hetman	Polish People's Party	EPP	44,937	4.37
The Left	Joanna Scheuring-Wielgus	New Left	S&D	57,669	5.61

=== 8th constituency (Lublin) ===
Electoral committee	Votes	%	Seats
Law and Justice	292,019	47.16	1
Civic Coalition	161,002	26.00	1
Confederation	93,542	15.11	0
Third Way	43,013	6.95	0
The Left	20,381	3.29	0
Bezpartyjni Samorządowcy	7,342	1.19	0
PolExit	1,864	0.30	0
Total	619,163	100.00	2
Valid votes	619,163	99.42	
Invalid/blank votes	3,586	0.58	
Total votes	622,749	100.00	
Registered voters/turnout	1,623,766	38.35	
Source: National Electoral Commission

Elected candidates
List	Name	Party	Group	# of votes	% of votes
Law and Justice	Mariusz Kamiński	Law and Justice	ECR	110,466	17.84
Civic Coalition	Marta Wcisło	Civic Platform	EPP	103,740	16.75

=== 9th constituency (Subcarpathian) ===
Electoral committee	Votes	%	Seats
Law and Justice	334,439	52.87	2
Civic Coalition	150,131	23.73	1
Confederation	96,376	15.23	1
Third Way	29,767	4.71	0
The Left	13,082	2.07	0
Bezpartyjni Samorządowcy	7,315	1.16	0
PolExit	1,516	0.24	0
Total	632,626	100.00	4
Valid votes	632,626	99.40	
Invalid/blank votes	3,846	0.60	
Total votes	636,472	100.00	
Registered voters/turnout	1,653,384	38.50	
Source: National Electoral Commission

Elected candidates
List	Name	Party	Group	# of votes	% of votes
Law and Justice	Daniel Obajtek	Law and Justice	ECR	171,689	27.14
Law and Justice	Bogdan Rzońca	Law and Justice	ECR	46,096	7.29
Civic Coalition	Elżbieta Łukacijewska	Civic Platform	EPP	115,324	18.23
Confederation	Tomasz Buczek	Confederation	NI	51,754	8.18

=== 10th constituency (Lesser Poland and Świętokrzyskie) ===
Electoral committee	Votes	%	Seats
Law and Justice	655,777	44.05	3
Civic Coalition	401,371	26.96	2
Confederation	210,553	14.14	1
Third Way	131,106	8.81	1
The Left	70,403	4.73	0
Bezpartyjni Samorządowcy	10,691	0.72	0
Normal Country	3,950	0.27	0
PolExit	3,704	0.25	0
Liberal Poland – Entrepreneurs' Strike	1,193	0.08	0
Total	1,488,748	100.00	7
Valid votes	1,488,748	99.47	
Invalid/blank votes	7,951	0.53	
Total votes	1,496,699	100.00	
Registered voters/turnout	3,583,080	41.77	
Source: National Electoral Commission

Elected candidates
List	Name	Party	Group	# of votes	% of votes
Law and Justice	Beata Szydło	Law and Justice	ECR	285,336	19.17
Law and Justice	Dominik Tarczyński	Law and Justice	ECR	210,942	14.17
Law and Justice	Arkadiusz Mularczyk	Law and Justice	ECR	93,551	6.28
Civic Coalition	Bartłomiej Sienkiewicz	Civic Platform	EPP	254,324	17.08
Civic Coalition	Jagna Marczułajtis-Walczak	Civic Platform	EPP	58,550	3.93
Confederation	Grzegorz Braun	Confederation of the Polish Crown	NI	113,746	7.64
Third Way	Adam Jarubas	Polish People's Party	EPP	81,674	5.49

=== 11th constituency (Silesian) ===
Electoral committee	Votes	%	Seats
Civic Coalition	551,782	41.42	3
Law and Justice	485,505	36.45	2
Confederation	135,195	10.15	1
Third Way	74,125	5.56	0
The Left	61,653	4.63	0
Bezpartyjni Samorządowcy	9,359	0.70	0
Normal Country	6,248	0.47	0
Repair Poland Movement	3,311	0.25	0
PolExit	2,861	0.21	0
Liberal Poland – Entrepreneurs' Strike	2,082	0.16	0
Total	1,332,121	100.00	6
Valid votes	1,332,121	99.48	
Invalid/blank votes	7,002	0.52	
Total votes	1,339,123	100.00	
Registered voters/turnout	3,322,289	40.31	
Source: National Electoral Commission

Elected candidates
List	Name	Party	Group	# of votes	% of votes
Civic Coalition	Borys Budka	Civic Platform	EPP	334,842	25.14
Civic Coalition	Łukasz Kohut	Independent	EPP	107,626	8.08
Civic Coalition	Mirosława Nykiel	Civic Platform	EPP	54,937	4.12
Law and Justice	Patryk Jaki	Sovering Poland	ECR	266,246	19.99
Law and Justice	Jadwiga Wiśniewska	Law and Justice	ECR	145,218	10.90
Confederation	Marcin Sypniewski	Confederation	ESN	49,553	3.72

=== 12th constituency (Lower Silesian and Opole) ===
Electoral committee	Votes	%	Seats
Civic Coalition	476,479	41.59	2
Law and Justice	360,558	31.48	2
Confederation	134,122	11.71	1
The Left	101,362	8.85	1
Third Way	56,088	4.90	0
Bezpartyjni Samorządowcy	13,981	1.22	0
PolExit	2,935	0.26	0
Total	1,145,525	100.00	6
Valid votes	1,145,525	99.40	
Invalid/blank votes	6,969	0.60	
Total votes	1,152,494	100.00	
Registered voters/turnout	2,921,817	39.44	
Source: National Electoral Commission

Elected candidates
List	Name	Party	Group	# of votes	% of votes
Civic Coalition	Bogdan Zdrojewski	Civic Platform	EPP	310,544	27.11
Civic Coalition	Andrzej Buła	Civic Platform	EPP	65,967	5.76
Law and Justice	Michał Dworczyk	Law and Justice	ECR	123,908	10.82
Law and Justice	Anna Zalewska	Law and Justice	ECR	108,305	9.45
Confederation	Stanisław Tyszka	New Hope	ESN	78,954	6.89
The Left	Krzysztof Śmiszek	New Left	S&D	70,363	6.14

=== 13th constituency (Lubusz and West Pomeranian) ===
Electoral committee	Votes	%	Seats
Civic Coalition	337,820	44.49	1
Law and Justice	226,086	29.77	1
The Left	71,916	9.47	0
Confederation	70,138	9.24	0
Third Way	44,190	5.82	0
Bezpartyjni Samorządowcy	7,275	0.96	0
PolExit	1,948	0.26	0
Total	759,373	100.00	2
Valid votes	759,373	99.33	
Invalid/blank votes	5,148	0.67	
Total votes	764,521	100.00	
Registered voters/turnout	2,018,554	37.87	
Source: National Electoral Commission

Elected candidates
List	Name	Party	Group	# of votes	% of votes
Civic Coalition	Bartosz Arłukowicz	Civic Platform	EPP	264,097	34.78
Law and Justice	Joachim Brudziński	Law and Justice	ECR	114,195	15.04
