= Front (Polish party) =

- Abbreviation: FRONT
- Leader: Krzysztof Tołwiński
- Founded: 2022
- Registered: 7 March 2023
- Headquarters: ul. Korycińska 40 19-122 Jasionówka
- Ideology: Agrarianism; Russophilia; Pro-Lukashenko; Anti-Americanism
- National affiliation: Normal Country (2023); Voice of Strong Poland (2024)
- Regional affiliation: Liberal Democratic Party of Belarus
- Colors: Brown; Black

Front is a Russophilic political party in Poland. The party was founded in 2022 by Krzysztof Tołwiński, a former politician of Polish People's Party and Law and Justice that was the Polish Vice-Minister of the State Treasury in 2007. The party became controversial for entering a formal agreement with the Liberal Democratic Party of Belarus and publicly expressing support for the presidents of Belarus and Russia, Alexander Lukashenko and Vladimir Putin. Front also became known for its members serving as the bodyguards of Russian ambassador in Poland Siergiej Andriejew, who was previously attacked by anti-Russian protesters when visiting the Mausoleum of the Soviet Soldiers Cemetery. The party is associated with anti-war and pro-Russian politicians in Poland, and in 2024 it co-founded the political coalition Voice of Strong Poland.

== History ==
The party was founded by former poseł and Vice-Minister of the State Treasury Krzysztof Tołwiński. Prior to founding the party, Tołwiński was an active politician in the 2000s — he was a member of the Polish People's Party (PSL), wójt in the Gmina Dziadkowice, a councillor of the Podlaskie Voivodeship Sejmik, and held the position of deputy marshal of the Podlaskie Voivodeship. In 2010, he left PSL and joined Law and Justice, becoming a member of the Sejm of the 6th term in the 2011 Polish parliamentary election. He unsuccessfully ran for the Sejm again in 2015 and 2019 from the lists of Kukiz'15 and the Confederation. After becoming disillusioned with other parties, he decided to found his own in 2023.

Front was registered on 7 March 2023 by Tołwiński, Halina Dondziło and Krzysztof Jabłoński. The party was founded shortly after the 2022 Russian invasion of Ukraine - Tołwiński then started gathering members and signatures for registration of the party. In June 2022, Tołwiński met with Arwid Pływaczewski, who stated that Poles of the Slavic Division "Zadrużny Krąg" were fighting on the side of separatists in the Donbas war. Since 2024, Front's politicians affiliate with the Liberal Democratic Party of Belarus and several times appeared in Belarusian media.

Tołwiński was interviewed by Radio Belarus, where he condemned "Western colonialism" and argued for a Slavic unity, stating that Poland should seek to deepen its ties with Russia and Belarus instead of becoming further dependent on Western countries. He also accentuated that the Liberal Democratic Party of Belarus extends its offer of cooperation to all Polish parties. In April 2023, Tołwiński was also the offial guest of the Russian embassy in Warsaw, where he met with the Russian ambassador to Poland and argued that "the place of Poland and Europe is by Russian Federation".

In September 2023, members of the party attacked buses transporting Ukrainian refugees; the party later released a recording of the incident. Front participated in the 2023 Polish parliamentary election, where it fielded six candidates, all contesting the election on the lists of Normal Country in Constituency 18 (Siedlce) - party leader Tołwiński (305 votes), Katarzyna Szmurło (60 votes), Krystian Pakulski (24 votes), Halina Dondziło (28 votes), Arwid Pływaczewski (10 votes) and Krzysztof Jabłoński (73 votes), winning 500 votes in total.

In February 2024, Tołwiński and other members of the party became state-recognized observers of the 2024 Belarusian parliamentary election. Front praised the election for "great atmosphere and highly professional committees". In May 2024, the party protected the Russian ambassador to Poland Siergiej Andriejew from attacks during his visit to the Mausoleum of the Soviet Soldiers Cemetery. On 12 June, the Russia Day, the party sent an official delegation led by Tołwiński to the Russian embassy, and gave Andriejew a present. In August 2024, the party organized a peace march protesting the Polish military support for Ukraine. There, Front announced the creation of a political coalition Voice of Strong Poland (Polish: Głos Silnej Polski) together with minor anti-war parties and public figures such as Leszek Sykulski.

Tołwiński was an official electoral observer at the 2025 Belarusian presidential election. Tołwiński argued that the election was not rigged, stating that Lukashenko had no reason to manipulate the result because he has the support of the majority of the nation. He condemned protests in Belarus, noting that they were funded by the services of Western countries in order to weaken and subordinate Belarus. Tołwiński also announced his candidacy in the 2025 Polish presidential election on behalf of the Front. The National Electoral Commission registered his presidential committee on 14 February 2025.

== Ideology ==
Front advocates for strengthening Polish-Russian and Polish-Belarusian relations, loosening the fertilizer embargo on Belarus. It advocates for replicating the economic policies of the Liberal Democratic Party of Belarus. The party argues that Poland is "not politically sovereign", and that "Poland's policy towards Russia and Belarus is paranoid and provocative." Front argues that "Ukraine is Poland's economic enemy, especially when it comes to agriculture", and that it is in Polish interest that Ukraine losses the Russo-Ukrainian War. It argues that "Ukraine does not own its lands” and that “international funds rule the country”. The party also expressed its support for Viktor Orbán and asked him to become an official mediator in the Belarus–European Union border crisis.

Amongst its goals, the party lists "liberation of Poland from the political protectorate of the United States", and "de-Americanisation of Europe" which is to be achieved by building a coalition of European political parties opposed to the US political interference. Front also calls for "de-Ukrainisation of Poland", defining it as ending every forms of cooperation with the Ukrainian state, as well as unconditionally blocking the influx of Ukrainian refugees from Ukraine. The leader of Front, Tołwiński, wrote: "The US supplying weapons to Ukrainians is just a pretence of helping, but in reality it is bleeding Ukraine and Russia dry. The US wants to expand its influence and is using us as a country of aggression so that Russia will attack NATO. The war could have ended at the very beginning if it weren't for the US." He also added: "There is no better way today to get rid of this very ideology, the Banderist ideology, from Ukraine, with Russian hands, of course."

The party also focuses on agrarian issues, and its economic platform has been described as agrarian. One of its protest slogans is "Normal food". The party argues that Poland has sold its agricultural production and food self-sufficiency to corporations, and states that the traditional Polish food was replaced with "unhealthy food, full of preservatives and fillers". Front praises the Belarusian collective farming system based on kolkhozes and sovkhozes, noting cheap prices, avoidance of chemical preservatives, and socialist-style organization. Tołwiński remarked: "The collective has a processing plant, shops, a restaurant - they operate like a cooperative. We are not organised in the same way, as the PGRs have shown."

== Electoral history ==
=== Sejm ===
Election	# of votes	% of votes	# of overall seats won	Government
2023	500	0.02 (#10) (Note: Percentage of votes for electoral list Normal Country)	0 / 460	Extra-parliamentary
2023	On the electoral lists of Normal Country.			
