= 2024 European Parliament election in Poland =

- 9 June 2024

All 53 Polish seats to the European Parliament
- Registered: 29,098,155
- Turnout: 11,829,556 (40.7%) ▼5.0 pp
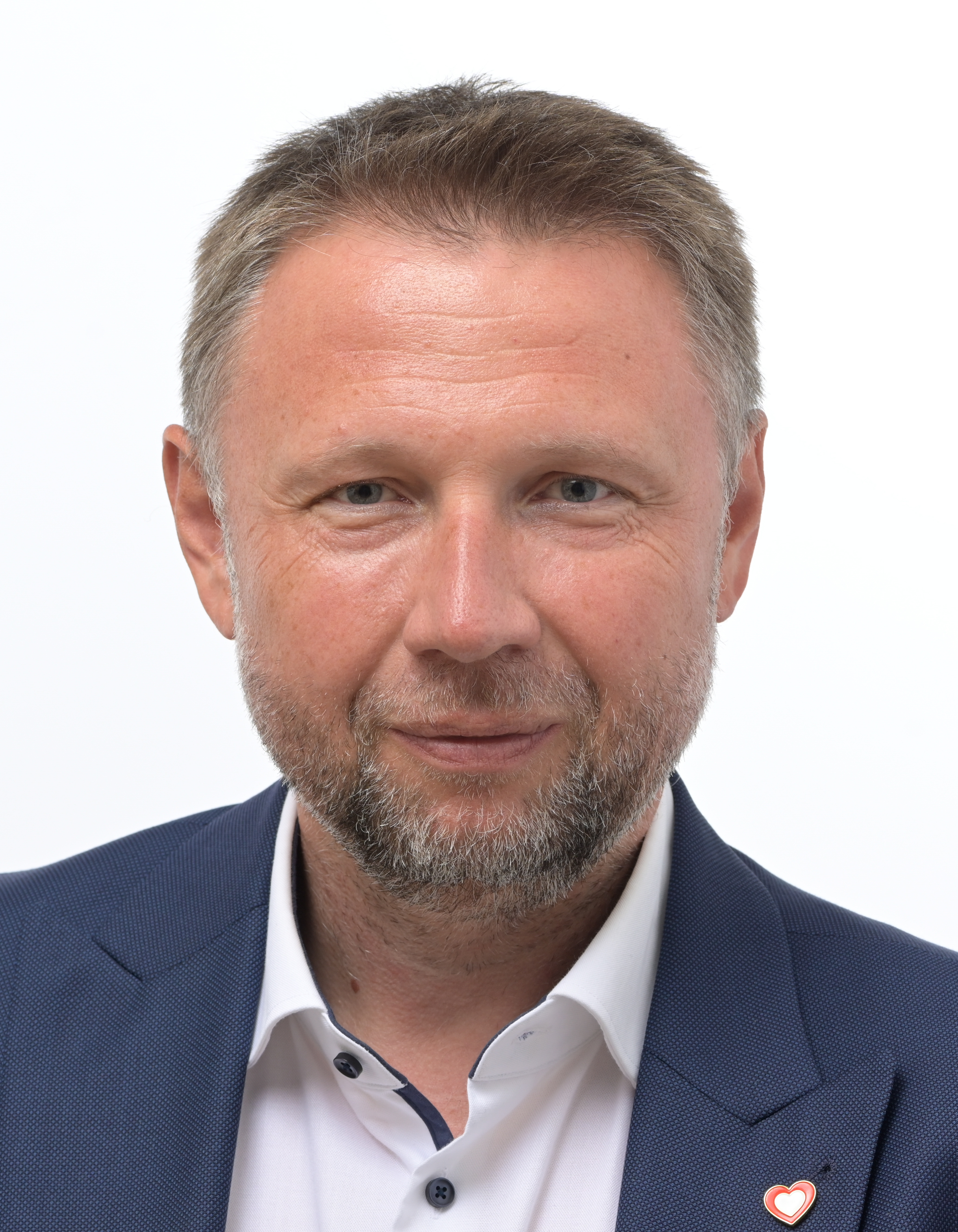

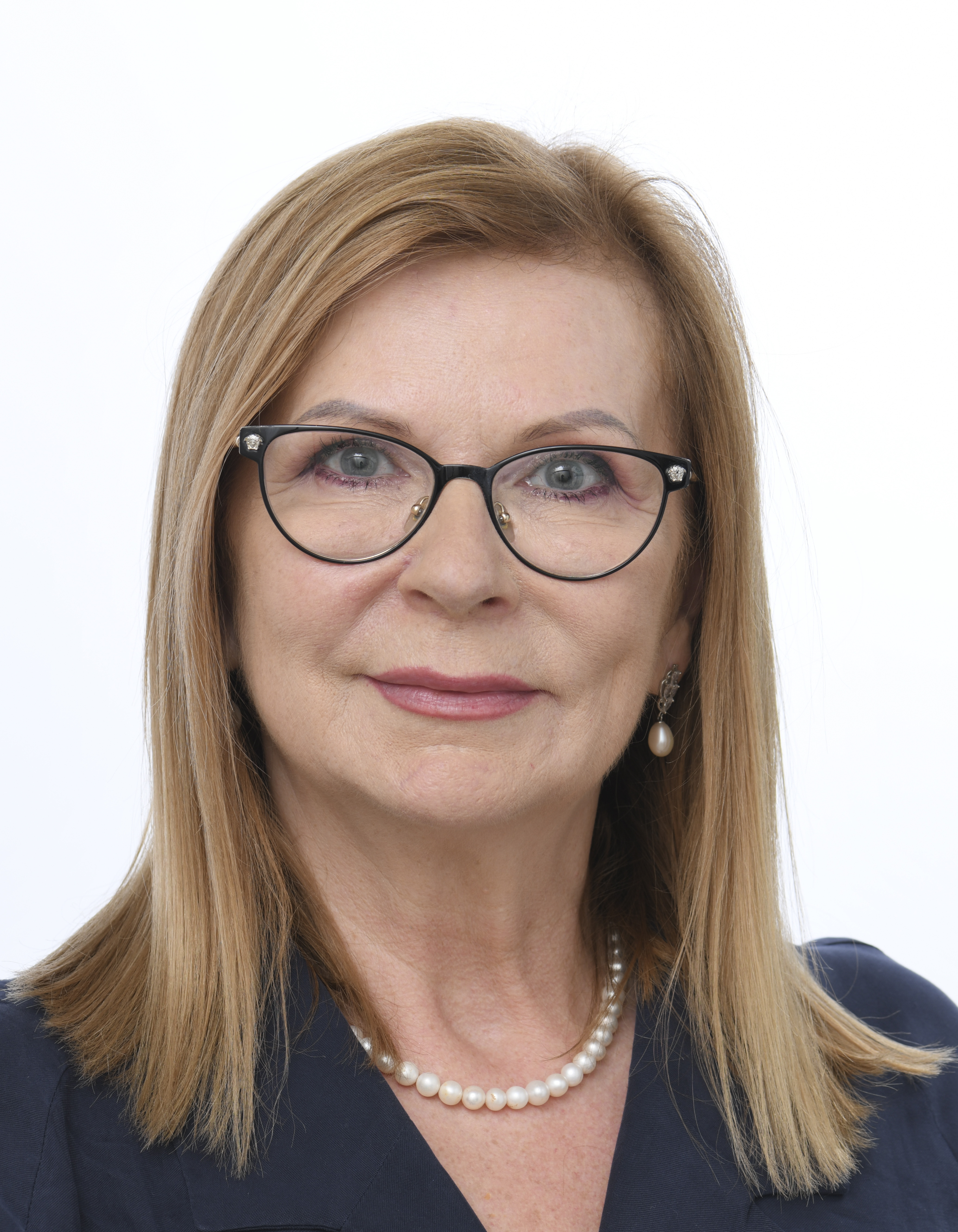

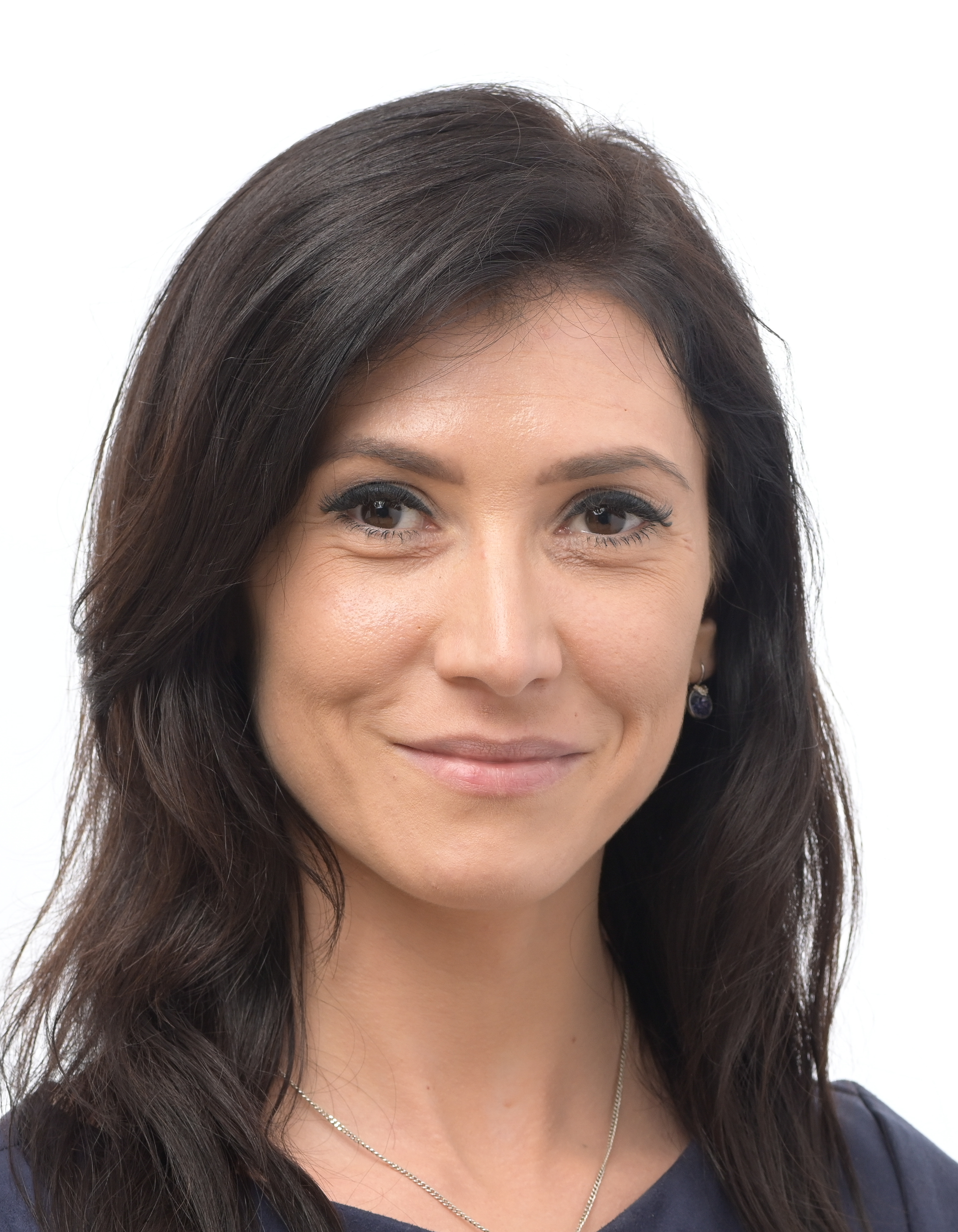

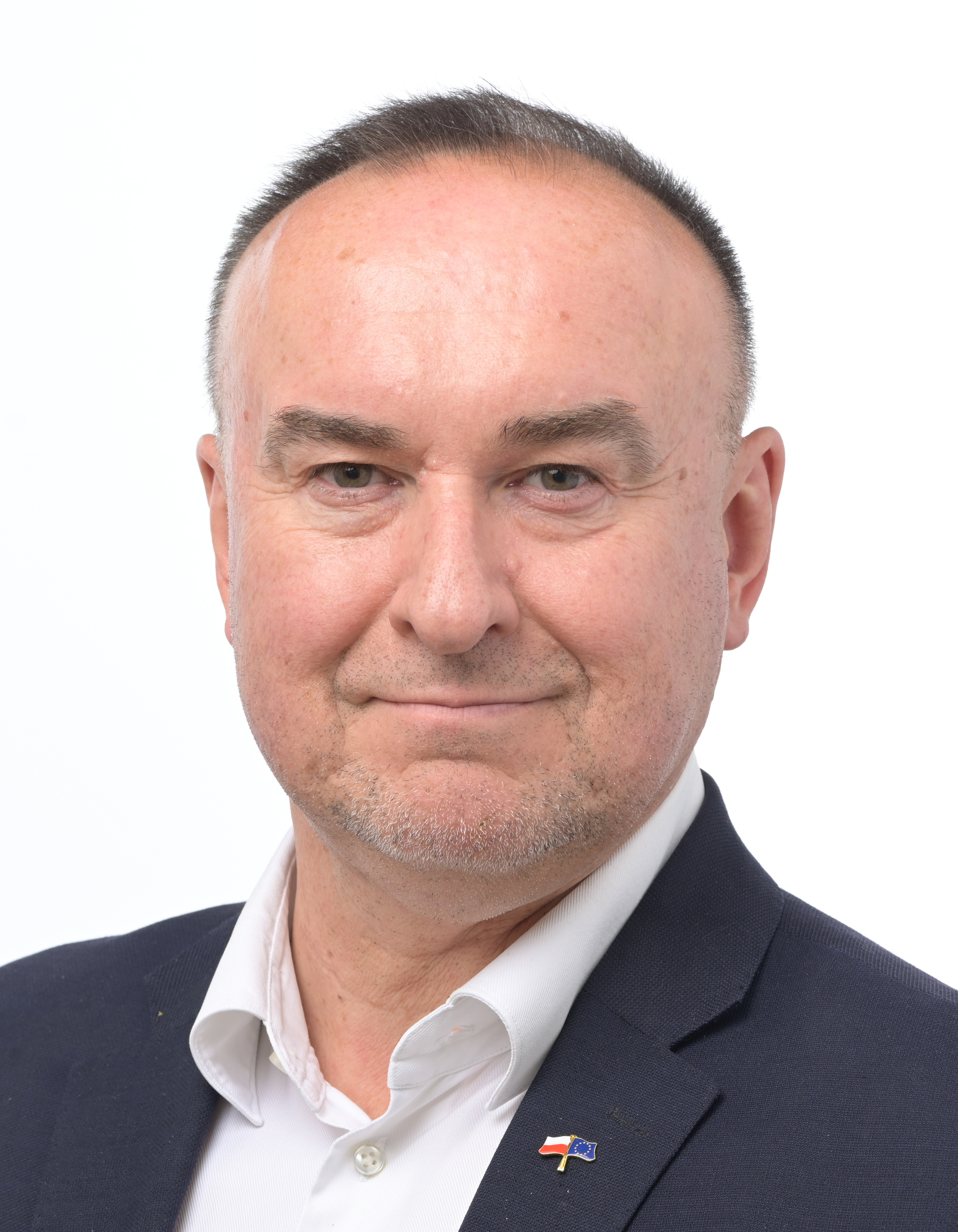

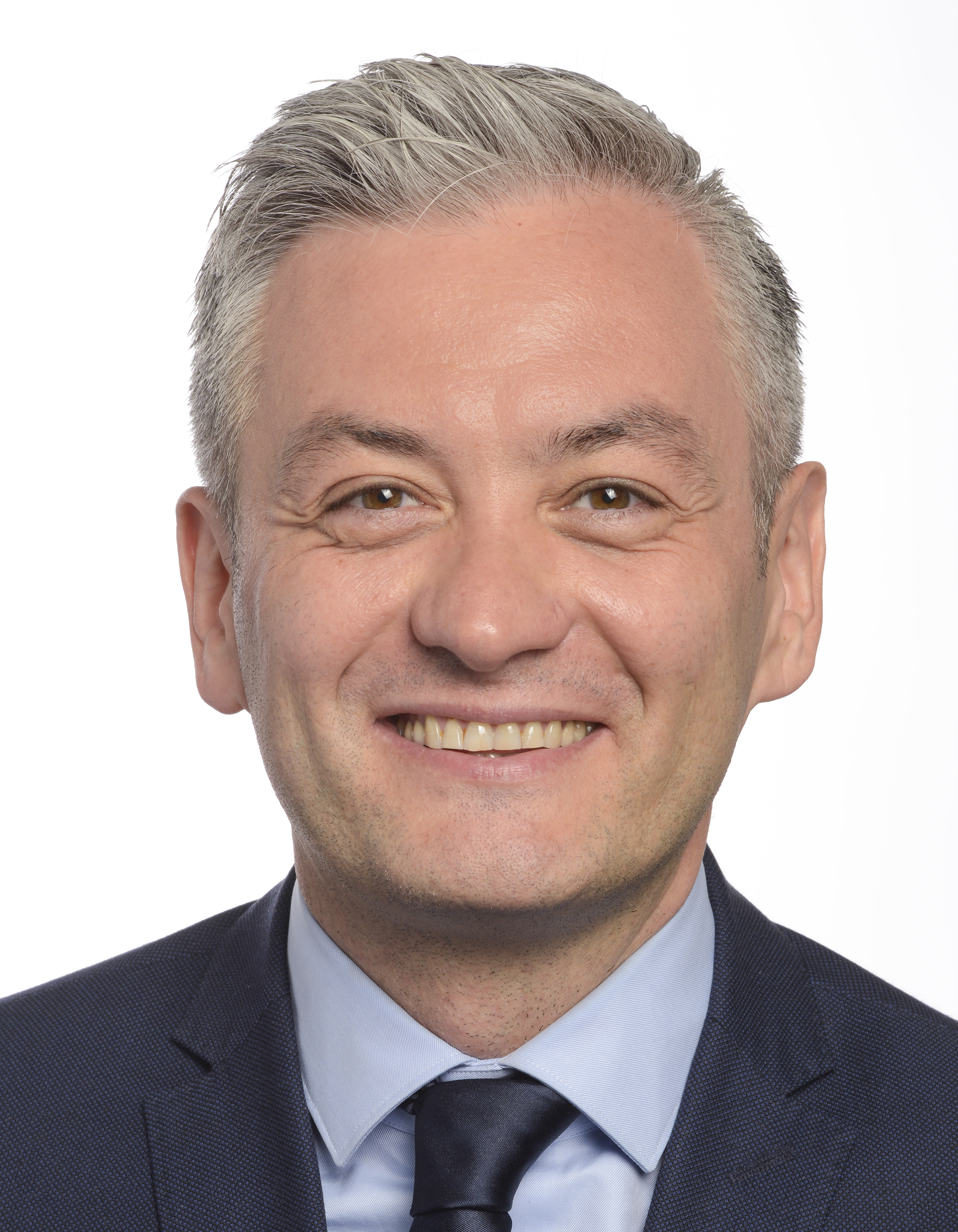
	First party	Second party	Third party
Leader	Marcin Kierwiński	Małgorzata Gosiewska	Ewa Zajączkowska-Hernik
Party	Civic Coalition (PO)	United Right (PiS)	Confederation (NN)
Alliance	EPP	ECR	ESN/PfE/NI
Last election	25.4%, 14 seats (Note: As part of the European Coalition.)	45.4%, 27 seats	4.6%, 0 seats
Seats won	21	20	6
Seat change	▲7	▼7	▲6
Popular vote	4,359,443	4,253,169	1,420,287
Percentage	37.1%	36.2%	12.1%
Swing	▲11.7 pp	▼9.2 pp	▲7.5 pp
	Fourth party	Fifth party
Leader	Michał Kobosko	Robert Biedroń
Party	Third Way (PL2050)	The Left (NL)
Alliance	EPP/RE	S&D
Last election	4.6%, 3 seats	13.3%, 8 seats (Note: As part of the European Coalition and Spring.)
Seats won	3	3
Seat change	Steady	▼5
Popular vote	813,238	741,071
Percentage	6.9%	6.3%
Swing	▲2.3 pp	▼7.0 pp
- Election result and the plurality list's popular vote in each constituency

The 2024 European Parliament election in Poland was held on 9 June 2024 as part of the 2024 European Parliament election. This was the first to take place after Brexit.

The elections were won by the Civic Coalition, the largest governing bloc. Together with its coalition partners Third Way and The Left, the ruling coalition won a combined majority of votes and seats. This was the first nationwide election in Poland since the 2014 European Parliament election in which the Law and Justice party did not come first, though it had recently lost power in the 2023 Polish parliamentary election when then-opposition parties won a combined majority.

== Background ==
Poland will elect 53 Members of the European Parliament. Compared to last election, Poland is entitled to one more MEP in this election. Political parties have to clear a 5% threshold to be awarded seats. Voters can indicate preferences for specific candidates of the party they chose. Turnout affects how many seats are awarded to each of the 13 constituencies.

== MEPs by European political group (pre-election) ==
National party	Seats/52	EP group	Seats/705
Law and Justice	25	European Conservatives and Reformists	67
Sovereign Poland	2	European Conservatives and Reformists	67
Civic Platform	13	European People's Party	177
Polish People's Party	2	European People's Party	177
Independent	1	European People's Party	177
New Left	6	Progressive Alliance of Socialists and Democrats	140
The Left for Europe	1	Progressive Alliance of Socialists and Democrats	140
Poland 2050	1	Renew Europe	102
Independent	1	Greens–European Free Alliance	72

== Lists ==
=== Electoral committees registered in all constituencies ===
List			Ideology	EU position	Leader(s)	EP Group	2019 result		Seats before the election	Candidates
List			Ideology	EU position	Leader(s)	EP Group	Votes (%)	Seats	Seats before the election	Candidates
1	TD	Third Way; Trzecia Droga List: Poland 2050 (PL2050); Polish People's Party (PSL); Centre for Poland (CdP); Union of European Democrats (UED); Silesian Regional Party (ŚPR); Wolnościowcy (W) (Note: Party leader of Wolnościowcy, Artur Dziambor, is running on Third Way list, while Dobromir Sośnierz is running on Confederation list.)	Christian democracy Liberal conservatism	Pro-Europeanism	Władysław Kosiniak-Kamysz; Szymon Hołownia	EPP; RE	4.6%	3 / 52	3 / 52	130
2	KWiN	Confederation Liberty and Independence; Konfederacja Wolność i Niepodległość List: Confederation Liberty and Independence (KWiN); New Hope (NN); National Movement (RN); Confederation of the Polish Crown (KKP); There is One Poland (PJJ); Real Europe Movement – Europa Christi (RPE); Wolnościowcy (W)	Polish nationalism Economic liberalism	Hard Euroscepticism	Sławomir Mentzen; Krzysztof Bosak; Grzegorz Braun	N/A	4.6%	0 / 52	0 / 52	130
3	BS	Bezpartyjni Samorządowcy List: Nonpartisan Localists - Poland Connects Us (BS); KORWiN; New Democracy - Yes (ND-T); Social Alternative (AS); New Hope (NN) (Note: Dominika Korwin-Mikke is running as an individual New Hope member on Bezpartyjni Samorządowcy list.)	Regionalism; Localism	Pro-Europeanism	Robert Raczyński	N/A	N/A	0 / 52	0 / 52	129
4	PolExit	PolExit List: PolExit; Congress of the New Right (KNP); Federation for the Republic (FdR); There is One Poland (PJJ) (Note: Jan Pietraga is running as an individual There is One Poland member on PolExit list.)	Traditional conservatism	Hard Euroscepticism	Stanisław Żółtek	N/A	0.1%	0 / 52	0 / 52	127
5	KO	Civic Coalition; Koalicja Obywatelska List: Civic Platform (PO); The Greens (Z); Modern (.N); Polish Initiative (iPL)	Liberalism; Liberal conservatism Social liberalism Green politics	Pro-Europeanism	Donald Tusk; Barbara Nowacka; Adam Szłapka; Urszula Zielińska	EPP; RE; G/EFA	25.41%	14 / 52	15 / 52	130
6	L	The Left; Lewica List: New Left (Poland) (NL); Left Together (LR); Labour Union (UP); Polish Socialist Party (PPS)	Social democracy Democratic socialism Progressivism	Pro-Europeanism	Włodzimierz Czarzasty; Robert Biedroń; Magdalena Biejat; Adrian Zandberg	S&D	13.3%	8 / 52	7 / 52	130
7	PiS	Law and Justice; Prawo i Sprawiedliwość List: Law and Justice (PiS); Sovereign Poland (SP)	National conservatism Right-wing populism	Soft Euroscepticism	Jarosław Kaczyński	ECR	45.4%	27 / 52	23 / 52	130

=== Electoral committees registered in more than one constituency ===
List			Ideology	EU position	Leader(s)	EP Group	2019 result		Seats before the election	# of constituencies	Candidates
List			Ideology	EU position	Leader(s)	EP Group	Votes (%)	Seats	Seats before the election	# of constituencies	Candidates
8	NK	Normal Country; Normalny Kraj List: Normal Country (NK); Silesians Together (ŚR); New Hope (NN) (Note: Patryk Olęncki is running as an individual New Hope member on Normal Country list.)	Anti-establishment; Right-wing populism	Soft Euroscepticism	Wiesław Lewicki	N/A	N/A	0 / 52	0 / 52	5	44
9	PL!SP	Liberal Poland Entrepreneurs' Strike; Polska Liberalna Strajk Przedsiębiorców	Libertarianism; Populism	Pro-Europeanism	Paweł Tanajno	N/A	N/A	0 / 52	0 / 52	6	43
10	RNP	Repair Poland Movement; Ruch Naprawy Polski List: Repair Poland Movement (RNP); Self-Defence (S)	National conservatism Right-wing populism	Soft Euroscepticism	Romuald Starosielec	N/A	0.0%	0 / 52	0 / 52	2	17

=== Electoral committees registered in a single constituency ===
List		Ideology	EU position	Leader(s)	Constituency	Candidates
GSP	Voice of Strong Poland; Głos Silnej Polski	Russophilia; Anti-Ukrainian sentiment Anti-Americanism	Hard Euroscepticism	Leszek Sykulski; Krzysztof Tołwiński	5 – Masovian	9

== Electoral committees ==
43 committees applied for registration, of which 40 have been registered: 28 political parties, nine voters committees and four coalitions. One committee self-dissolved and two were denied registration.

Electoral committees
	Type	Committee	Status
1	Party	Normal Country	Fielded lists
2	Party	Normal Poland	Registered
3	Party	Free Europe	Registered
4	Party	Repair Poland Movement	Fielded lists
5	Party	Confederation Liberty and Independence	Fielded lists
6	Party	PolExit	Fielded lists
7	Voters	Prosperity and Peace Movement	Registered
8	Party	Self-Defence of the Republic of Poland	Registered
9	Party	Independence	Self-dissolved
10	Party	Right-Wing	Registered
11	Voters	Confederation and Nonpartisan Localists	Registered
12	Party	Social Alternative	Registered
13	Party	Liberal Poland – Entrepreneurs' Strike	Fielded lists
14	Party	Slavic Union	Registered
15	Voters	Voice of Strong Poland	Fielded lists
16	Party	Self-Defence	Registered
17	Party	Congress of the New Right	Registered
18	Party	New Hope	Registered
19	Party	Nonpartisans	Registered
20	Party	Pro-Polish Confederation	Registered
21	Voters	Nonpartisan Localists-Normal Poland in Normal Europe	Fielded lists
22	Coalition	PolExit Independence	Registered
23	Voters	Polexit?It's High Time!	Registered
24	Coalition	The Left	Fielded lists
25	Coalition	Civic Coalition	Fielded lists
26	Party	People's Party "Patrimony" RP	Registered
27	Party	Silesians Together	Registered
28	Party	Law and Justice	Fielded lists
29	Party	Movement of Unity of Poles	Registered
30	Party	Polish National Interest	Registered
31	Party	Social Democracy of Poland	Registered
32	Voters	Farmers from the Baltic to the Tatras	Registered
33	Party	Confederation of the Polish Crown	Registered
34	Coalition	Third Way Poland 2050 of Szymon Hołownia - Polish People's Party	Fielded lists
35	Party	Compatriots	Registered
36	Voters	Social Poland	Registered
37	Party	Conservative Party	Registered
38	Party	Sovereign Poland	Registered
39	Party	Labour Faction	Registered
40	Voters	„Together for the Community"	Registered
41	Voters	Residents of RP and Marcin Latos	Rejected
42	Voters	Nonpartisan Anti-System	Registered
43	Party	„Piast” Faction	Rejected

== Leaders by constituency ==
Registered lists with a numbers on a ballot paper
Constituency	1	2	3	4	5	6	7
Constituency	TD	KWiN	BS	PolExit	KO	L	PiS
1 - Pomeranian	Wioleta Tomczak	Przemysław Wipler	Natalia Kruczek	Jakub Perkowski	Janusz Lewandowski	Katarzyna Ueberhan	Anna Fotyga
2 - Kuyavian-Pomeranian	Ryszard Bober	Sławomir Ozdyk	Sławomir Woźniak	Krzysztof Czerepiuk	Krzysztof Brejza	Piotr Kowal	Kosma Złotowski
3 - Podlaskie and Warmian-Masurian	Paweł Zalewski	Piotr Lisiecki	Urszula Brzozowska	Miłosz Kuziemka	Jacek Protas	Bożena Przyłuska	Maciej Wąsik
4 - Warsaw	Michał Kobosko	Krystian Kamiński	Marek Woch	Tomasz Kwiatkowski	Marcin Kierwiński	Robert Biedroń	Małgorzata Gosiewska
5 - Masovian	Bożena Żelazowska	Rafał Foryś	Piotr Bakun	Monika Żółtek	Andrzej Halicki	Anna Maria Żukowska	Adam Bielan
6 - Łódź	Jolanta Zięba-Gzik	Jacek Wilk	Jacek Bartyzel	Antoni Sajdak	Dariusz Joński	Marek Belka	Witold Waszczykowski
7 - Greater Poland	Krzysztof Hetman	Anna Bryłka	Przemysław Grzegorek	Tomasz Krzcziuk	Ewa Kopacz	Joanna Scheuring-Wielgus	Wojciech Kolarski
8 - Lublin	Sławomir Ćwik	Mirosław Piotrowski	Beata Tyrka-Stećko	Leszek Samborski	Marta Wcisło	Agata Fisz	Mariusz Kamiński
9 - Subcarpathian	Elżbieta Burkiewicz	Tomasz Buczek	Paweł Frankiewicz	Grzegorz Rykała	Elżbieta Łukacijewska	Wiktoria Barańska	Daniel Obajtek
10 - Lesser Poland and Świętokrzyskie	Adam Jarubas	Konrad Berkowicz	Stanisław Skuza	Stanisław Żółtek	Bartłomiej Sienkiewicz	Andrzej Szejna	Beata Szydło
11 - Silesian	Michał Gramatyka	Marcin Sypniewski	Janusz Korwin-Mikke	Tomasz Skóra	Borys Budka	Maciej Konieczny	Jadwiga Wiśniewska
12 - Lower Silesian and Opole	Róża Thun	Stanisław Tyszka	Oskar Kida	Norbert Czarnek	Bogdan Zdrojewski	Krzysztof Śmiszek	Anna Zalewska
13 - Lubusz and West Pomeranian	Michał Kamiński	Magdalena Sosnowska	Krzysztof Łopatowski	Janusz Żurek	Bartosz Arłukowicz	Włodzimierz Cimoszewicz	Joachim Brudziński

== Opinion polling ==
Graphical summary of opinion polls: Civic Platform Law and Justice Konfederacja Third Way Lewica

Polling firm/Link	Fieldwork date	Sample size	United Right ECR		Third Way EPP–Ren.	Civic Coalition EPP–G/EFA–Ren.	The Left S&D			Confederation NI	There is One Poland NI	Bezpartyjni Samorządowcy NI	PolExit NI	Others	Don't know	Lead
Polling firm/Link	Fieldwork date	Sample size	Law and Justice	Kukiz'15	Third Way EPP–Ren.	Civic Coalition EPP–G/EFA–Ren.	New Left		Left Together	Confederation NI	There is One Poland NI	Bezpartyjni Samorządowcy NI	PolExit NI	Others	Don't know	Lead
Polling firm/Link	Fieldwork date	Sample size	Law and Justice	Kukiz'15	Third Way EPP–Ren.	Civic Coalition EPP–G/EFA–Ren.	SLD	Spring	Left Together	Confederation NI	There is One Poland NI	Bezpartyjni Samorządowcy NI	PolExit NI	Others	Don't know	Lead
IPSOS (Late Poll)	10 June		35.7; 20		7.3; 4	37.4; 20	6.6; 3			11.8; 6		0.8; 0	0.3; 0	0.1; 0		1.7
IPSOS	9 June		33.9; 19		8.2; 4	38.2; 21	6.6; 3			11.9; 6		0.8; 0	0.3; 0	0.1; 0		4.3
Pollster / Republika	6–7 Jun 2024	1,083	33		11	34	9			12				1		1
OGB	4–7 Jun 2024	800	36.04; 18		7.54; 5	37.45; 20	5.01; 4			11.49; 6		0.59; 0	0.15; 0	1.73; 0		1.41
IBRiS / "Wydarzenia" Polsat	6 Jun 2024	–	30.5		9.6	31.5	8.1			9.7		0.6	0.1		10.0	1.0
Pollster / "SE.pl"	5–6 Jun 2024	1,031	31.63		11.65	34.86	8.94			10.72				2.20		3.23
IPSOS / OKO.press, TOK FM	4–6 Jun 2024	1,000	29		10	33	7			11		2	1		7	4
ewybory.eu	17 May–6 Jun 2024	5,709	33.7		10.9	33.3	9.6			10.2		1.7	0.5	0.1		0.4
Opinia24 / Gazeta Wyborcza	4–5 Jun 2024	1,001	29.8; 19		8.9; 5	32.1; 20	7.7; 4			9; 5				3.6; 0	8.9	2.3
Opinia24 / TVN	4–5 Jun 2024	1,000	32		9	34	8			10		2	1	1	3	2
CBOS	20 May–5 Jun 2024	1,038	28.9		11.4	33.4	9.7			10.5		0.5		0.4	5.3	4.5
IPSOS / TVP	3–4 June 2024	–	29.2; 16		10.9; 6	34.5; 20	8.0; 4			13.6; 7		2.6; 0	0.6; 0			5.3
IBRiS / Onet	3 Jun 2024	1,067	31.3; 18		11.6; 7	33.1; 19	8.2; 4			9.0; 5				0.2; 0	6.6	1.8
IBRiS / "Wydarzenia" Polsat	3 Jun 2024 (Note: Publication date)	–	30.1		10.7	29.5	8.0			9.5		2.0	0.1		10.0	0.6
Research Partner	31 May–3 Jun 2024	1,073	32.1; 20		9.0; 5	31.5; 19	6.5; 4			9.4; 5		2.9; 0		0.1; 0	8.5	0.6
CBOS	20 May–2 Jun 2024	1,038	29		12	27	7			10		2		1	11	2
United Surveys / WP.pl	24–26 May 2024	1,000	30.8		10.8	32.4	7.8			11.7		0.3	0.2	0.1	5.9	1.6
IPSOS / TVP	22–25 May 2024	1,000	30		9	29	8			13		1	0	1	9	1
IBRiS / "Wydarzenia" Polsat	20 May 2024 (Note: Publication date)	–	30.0		10.1	30.8	8.1			8.8		2.1	0.0		10.1	0.8
Opinia24	13–14 May 2024	1,000	29		8	31	6			10		2			13	2
United Surveys / DGP, RMF	10–12 May 2024	1,000	32.7; 19		12.6; 7	30.3; 17	9.6; 5			8.6; 5		0.9; 0	0.0; 0	0.2; 0	5.1	2.4
IPSOS / OKO.press, TOK FM	26 Apr–9 May 2024	1,096	27		9	28	8			10		2		1	12	1
IBRiS / "Wydarzenia" Polsat	7–8 May 2024	1,000	29.3		12.1	28.3	9.7			9.9				1.5	9.2	1.0
Opinia24 / TOK FM	6–8 May 2024	1,001	30.6		7.7	30.8	9.0			8.3		2.7			10.9	0.2
	29 Apr 2024	Confederation announces There is One Poland candidates on their lists.														
OGB	22–25 Apr 2024	804	32.66; 18		13.81; 7	33.21; 18	5.57; 3			12.30; 7				2.45; 0		0.55
Ipsos / Euronews	23 Feb–5 Mar 2024	1,000	29.2		16.5	31.3	8.4			13.9						2.1
Opinia24 / TOK FM	26–28 Feb 2024	1,002	22		11	31	11			10				3 (Note: KORWiN – 1)	11	9
Opinia24 / More In Common Polska	2–13 Feb 2024	2,027	29.0		14.0	33.5	8.5			7.5				1.3	6.2	4.5
Portland Communications	24–31 Jan 2024	632	29		16	35	9			8				3		6
Parliamentary election	15 Oct 2023	21,596,674 (Note: Turnout: 74,38%)	35.38		14.40	30.70	8.61			7.16	1.63	1.86	–	0.28		4.68
Parliamentary election	13 Oct 2019	18,678,457 (Note: Turnout: 61,74%)	43.59	8.55		27.40	12.56			6.81	–	0.78	–	0.31		16.19
European election	26 May 2019	13,647,311 (Note: Turnout: 45,69%)	45.38; 27	3.69; 0	38.47; 22			6.06; 3	1.24; 0	4.55; 0	–	–	0.06	0.54		6.91

== Results ==
Party or alliance		Votes	%	Seats	+/–
Civic Coalition	Civic Platform	3,535,260	30.06	17	+5
Civic Coalition	Polish Initiative	194,109	1.65	1	New
Civic Coalition	Independents and others	630,074	5.36	3	+1
Civic Coalition	Total	4,359,443	37.06	21	+7
United Right	Law and Justice	3,575,523	30.40	18	–3
United Right	Sovereign Poland	575,261	4.89	2	+1
United Right	Independents	102,385	0.87	0	–4
United Right	Total	4,253,169	36.16	20	–7
Confederation	New Hope	375,140	3.19	3	New
Confederation	National Movement	328,388	2.79	2	New
Confederation	Confederation of the Polish Crown	302,317	2.57	1	New
Confederation	Independents and others	414,442	3.52	0	0
Confederation	Total	1,420,287	12.08	6	+6
Third Way	Polish People's Party	366,901	3.12	2	–1
Third Way	Poland 2050	306,298	2.60	1	New
Third Way	Independents and others	140,039	1.19	0	0
Third Way	Total	813,238	6.91	3	0
The Left	New Left	458,190	3.90	3	–5
The Left	Independents and others	282,881	2.41	0	0
The Left	Total	741,071	6.30	3	–5
Bezpartyjni Samorządowcy		108,926	0.93	0	New
PolExit		29,195	0.25	0	0
Normal Country		20,308	0.17	0	New
Liberal Poland – Entrepreneurs' Strike		9,453	0.08	0	New
Repair Poland Movement		4,737	0.04	0	0
Voice of Strong Poland		2,167	0.02	0	New
Total		11,761,994	100.00	53	+1
Valid votes		11,761,994	99.43		
Invalid/blank votes		67,731	0.57		
Total votes		11,829,725	100.00		
Registered voters/turnout		29,098,155	40.65		
Source: PKW

Results of the 2024 European parliament election in Poland by voivodeships

Results of the 2024 European Parliament election in Poland by powiats

Results of the 2024 European Parliament election in Poland by gminas

=== By constituency ===
Constituency	Civic Coalition		Law and Justice		Confederation		Third Way		The Left		Bezpartyjni Samorządowcy		PolExit		Normal Country		PL!SP		Others	
Constituency	%	Seats	%	Seats	%	Seats	%	Seats	%	Seats	%	Seats	%	Seats	%	Seats	%	Seats	%	Seats
1 – Pomeranian	51.06	2	28.07	1	9.37	0	5.40	0	4.65	0	1.13	0	0.33	0	–	–	–	–	–	–
2 – Kuyavian-Pomeranian	44.38	1	31.30	1	10.24	0	7.98	0	4.71	0	0.87	0	0.27	0	–	–	0.24	0	–	–
3 – Podlaskie and Warmian–Masurian	37.36	1	36.75	1	12.71	0	7.87	0	3.60	0	1.01	0	0.25	0	0.44	0	–	–	–	–
4 – Warsaw	44.46	3	24.82	2	11.96	1	7.06	1	10.41	1	1.06	0	0.23	0	–	–	–	–	–	–
5 – Masovian	23.81	1	49.17	2	12.94	0	9.10	0	3.25	0	0.70	0	0.20	0	0.22	0	0.10	0	0.50 (Note: Voice of Strong Poland – 0.30 Repair Poland Movement – 0.20)	0
6 – Łódź	33.29	1	38.60	1	10.96	0	5.91	0	9.93	0	0.83	0	0.25	0	–	–	0.22	0	–	–
7 – Greater Poland	38.85	2	28.92	1	13.18	1	9.24	1	8.06	1	0.76	0	0.23	0	0.53	0	0.24	0	–	–
8 – Lublin	26.00	1	47.16	1	15.11	0	6.95	0	3.29	0	1.19	0	0.30	0	–	–	–	–	–	–
9 – Subcarpathian	23.73	1	52.87	2	15.23	1	4.71	0	2.07	0	1.16	0	0.24	0	–	–	–	–	–	–
10 – Lesser Poland and Świętokrzyskie	26.96	2	44.05	3	14.14	1	8.81	1	4.73	0	0.72	0	0.25	0	0.27	0	0.08	0	–	–
11 – Silesian	41.42	3	36.45	2	10.15	1	5.56	0	4.63	0	0.70	0	0.21	0	0.47	0	0.16	0	0.25 (Note: Repair Poland Movement)	0
12 – Lower Silesian and Opole	41.59	2	31.48	2	11.71	1	4.90	0	8.85	1	1.22	0	0.26	0	–	–	–	–	–	–
13 – Lubusz and West Pomeranian	44.49	1	29.77	1	9.24	0	5.82	0	9.47	0	0.96	0	0.26	0	–	–	–	–	–	–
Poland	37.06	21	36.16	20	12.08	6	6.91	3	6.30	3	0.93	0	0.25	0	0.17	0	0.08	0	0.06	0
Source: National Electoral Commission

== Electorate demographics ==
Demographic	Turnout	Civic Coalition	Law and Justice	Confederation	Third Way	The Left	Bezpartyjni Samorządowcy	PolExit	Others
Total vote	40.2%	37.4%	35.9%	12.0%	6.9%	6.6%	0.8%	0.3%	0.1%
Sex
Men	40.2%	35.2%	34.4%	16.4%	6.8%	5.8%	0.9%	0.4%	0.1%
Women	40.3%	40.0%	35.7%	8.1%	7.2%	7.9%	0.8%	0.2%	0.1%
Age
18–29 years old	26.5%	26.4%	16.2%	30.0%	9.8%	15.3%	1.6%	0.5%	0.2%
30–39 years old	34.0%	32.4%	24.0%	22.4%	9.5%	9.4%	1.5%	0.5%	0.3%
40–49 years old	39.9%	40.5%	29.7%	12.8%	8.5%	6.9%	1.0%	0.5%	0.1%
50–59 years old	48.8%	39.8%	39.5%	8.8%	6.7%	4.3%	0.6%	0.3%	0.0%
60 or older	46.5%	40.6%	46.1%	3.9%	4.4%	4.5%	0.3%	0.1%	0.1%
Occupation
Company owner	n/a	47.2%	21.2%	16.7%	7.6%	5.7%	0.9%	0.5%	0.2%
Manager/expert	n/a	46.3%	19.7%	13.1%	9.3%	10.3%	0.9%	0.3%	0.1%
Admin/services	n/a	37.9%	28.5%	14.6%	9.0%	8.2%	1.2%	0.3%	0.2%
Farmer	n/a	11.6%	61.9%	15.5%	7.7%	2.2%	0.6%	0.5%	0.0%
Worker	n/a	24.4%	47.2%	17.3%	6.1%	3.2%	1.1%	0.5%	0.2%
Student	n/a	29.1%	14.7%	24.6%	10.9%	18.5%	1.4%	0.6%	0.2%
Unemployed	n/a	27.2%	42.8%	14.3%	7.2%	7.3%	1.0%	0.1%	0.1%
Retired	n/a	40.6%	46.3%	3.7%	4.2%	4.7%	0.4%	0.1%	0.0%
Others	n/a	33.2%	32.5%	17.6%	6.7%	8.1%	1.3%	0.4%	0.2%
Agglomeration
Rural	35.6%	26.1%	46.4%	15.0%	7.7%	3.6%	0.8%	0.3%	0.1%
<50,000 pop.	38.3%	37.8%	36.8%	11.6%	7.0%	5.5%	0.8%	0.4%	0.1%
51,000 - 200,000 pop.	41.4%	46.0%	30.8%	10.1%	5.7%	6.0%	1.0%	0.3%	0.1%
201,000 – 500,000 pop.	47.0%	50.1%	27.4%	8.5%	6.3%	6.6%	0.7%	0.3%	0.1%
>500,000 pop.	53.9%	46.1%	20.2%	9.8%	6.5%	16.0%	0.9%	0.4%	0.1%
Education
Elementary	n/a	19.5%	61.6%	9.6%	4.9%	3.2%	0.8%	0.2%	0.2%
Vocational	n/a	24.3%	58.2%	8.8%	5.3%	2.4%	0.7%	0.2%	0.1%
Secondary	n/a	36.7%	36.4%	13.2%	6.6%	5.8%	0.8%	0.4%	0.1%
Higher	n/a	45.4%	22.6%	12.8%	8.1%	9.7%	0.9%	0.3%	0.2%
Sejm vote in 2023
Law and Justice	n/a	1.3%	91.1%	6.1%	1.0%	0.2%	0.2%	0.1%	0.0%
Civic Coalition	n/a	86.9%	1.2%	2.0%	3.8%	5.6%	0.3%	0.1%	0.1%
Third Way	n/a	35.3%	6.0%	8.6%	41.5%	6.3%	1.6%	0.1%	0.4%
The Left	n/a	28.6%	2.7%	3.2%	4.6%	59.6%	0.8%	0.4%	0.1%
Confederation	n/a	4.0%	7.3%	84.4%	1.6%	0.6%	1.4%	0.7%	0.0%
Bezpartyjni Samorządowcy	n/a	14.3%	28.1%	22.0%	9.0%	4.3%	20.6%	1.1%	0.6%
There is One Poland	n/a	6.6%	23.4%	54.8%	3.6%	1.4%	4.6%	5.0%	0.6%
Others	n/a	22.0%	13.6%	31.3%	5.2%	13.0%	7.1%	5.9%	1.9%
Didn't vote	n/a	26.1%	30.3%	24.4%	9.8%	6.2%	2.4%	0.5%	0.3%
Don't remember	n/a	29.8%	32.3%	16.3%	11.6%	6.3%	2.0%	1.3%	0.4%
Second-round president vote in 2020
Andrzej Duda	n/a	3.0%	78.2%	14.8%	2.6%	0.6%	0.5%	0.2%	0.1%
Rafał Trzaskowski	n/a	72.4%	1.3%	4.0%	9.1%	12.3%	0.6%	0.2%	0.1%
Didn't vote	n/a	25.5%	15.6%	35.0%	11.5%	9.1%	2.3%	0.8%	0.2%
Don't remember	n/a	31.9%	22.5%	22.1%	12.7%	6.7%	2.7%	1.0%	0.4%
Source: Ipsos

== Aftermath ==
Civic Coalition won the most votes and finally overtook the Law and Justice party (de facto United Right) as the most supported list in Poland since the 2023 Polish parliamentary election. Also, it was the first time since the 2014 European Parliament election that a Civic Platform-led list won the most votes in Poland.
