= Voice of Strong Poland =

Voice of Strong Poland Głos Silnej Polski
- Abbreviation: GSP
- Leader: Leszek Sykulski, Krzysztof Tołwiński
- Founded: 25 March 2024
- Dissolved: 9 June 2024
- Headquarters: ul. Urbanistów 8/77, Warsaw
- Ideology: Russophilia; Hard Euroscepticism; Anti-Ukrainian sentiment Anti-Americanism
- Members: Safe Poland; Front
- European Parliament: 0 / 53

Website
- glossilnejpolski.pl

Voice of Strong Poland (Polish: Głos Silnej Polski, GSP) was an electoral alliance created by the Safe Poland and Front parties for the 2024 European Parliament election.

== History ==
The alliance was created by former members of Confederation Liberty and Independence dissatisfied with its foreign policy. Safe Poland was founded in 2023 by politicians formerly in the Confederation of the Polish Crown, while Front is the successor of Farmer-Consumer Confederation, an informal organization within Confederation Liberty and Independence. Its leaders were geopolitician and historian Leszek Sykulski (Safe Poland) and farmer activist, former MP and vice minister of State Treasury Krzysztof Tołwiński (Front). The committee was applied for registration on 25 March 2024. It registered a list in the Masovian constituency. All of its candidates were independents. The committee received 2167 votes, earning the last place with 0.02% of the nationwide vote.

== Ideology ==
The alliance supported normalization of relations and increased trade with Belarus, Russia and China. It supported withdrawal of Poland from the European Union and joining BRICS. The committee was opposed to helping Ukraine in its war with Russia. It promoted the slogans "Stop the Ukrainization of Poland" and "Stop the Americanization of Poland". Additionally it supported keeping złoty as the national currency and criticized the World Health Organization, opposing "sanitary segregation".

== Election results ==
=== European Parliament ===
Election	Leader	Votes	%	Seats	+/−	EP Group
2024	Leszek Sykulski; Krzysztof Tołwiński	2,167	0.02 (#11)	0 / 53	New	−
