= Normal Country =

Normal Country Normalny Kraj
- Abbreviation: NK
- Chairman: Wiesław Lewicki
- Founded: January 2015
- Split from: Association "Republicans"
- Headquarters: ul. Rabsztyńska 15/3, Warsaw
- Membership (2026): ~5,000
- Ideology: Anti-capitalism; Euroscepticism; Social conservatism Polish nationalism
- Political position: Right-wing
- Sejm: 0 / 460
- Senate: 0 / 100
- European Parliament: 0 / 53
- Regional assemblies: 0 / 552
- Mayors: 0 / 2,476
- Powiat Councils: 0 / 6,170
- Gmina Councils: 1 / 39,416

Website
- https://normalnykraj.pl/

Normal Country (Polish: Normalny Kraj, NK) is a Polish right-wing political party founded in January 2015 as a result of a split in Association "Republicans". It was formally registered on 30 April 2015. Until 14 June 2015, it was known as Republican Congress (Polish: Kongres Republikański). Ever since its creation, the party has actively pursued participation in the elections, although unsuccessfully. The party's leader is Wiesław Lewicki, former activist in Polish organizations in Germany, who tried to run as a presidential candidate in 2020, and 2025. The party espouses anti-capitalist, anti-NATO, as well as conservative, and Eurosceptic views.

The party postulates "national renewal" of Poland, arguing that Poles are being "denationalized". The party seeks alliance with China, socialization of the Polish natural resources, infrastructure tax on every foreign business in Poland, income tax for all companies, rejecting the Euro, and heavily restricting immigration. Krzysztof Tołwiński of the Front, known for pro-Lukashenko and pro-Russian views, was a leader of the party's electoral list in 2023; he also made trips together with Normal Country members to Belarus, where they became guests of the Belarusian national Radio Belarus. As such, the party is considered pro-Russian.

== History ==
The creation of Republican Congress was announced in January 2015 by members of Association "Republicans" (Stowarzyszenie "Republikanie") dissatisfied with the leadership of Przemysław Wipler, including Tomasz Jaskóła (who soon left the Congress in favor of Kukiz’15). Krzysztof Fluder became its chairman. During its first convention on 14 June 2015, it was renamed to Normal Country and former Congress of the New Right member Wiesław Lewicki became its new chairman. The party also cut ties with the idea of republicanism, taking on an anti-establishment and strongly right-wing bend. The former chairman Krzysztof Flunder founded a centre-right splinter party Republicans RP (Republikanie RP) which dissolved in 2017.

Normal Country established cooperation with Patriotic Poland and Organisation of the Polish Nation - Polish League. In the 2019 Polish parliamentary election, the party fielded a Senate candidate Wojciech Mateńka from Patriotic Poland in Lublin I constituency. He achieved 7.03% of the vote. In the 2020 Polish presidential election, the party tried to field its chairman NK Wiesław Lewicki but failed to collect enough signatures. Signatures submitted by the party were found to be insufficient, and about 15 of the signatures were found to come from deceased persons.

In the 2023 Polish parliamentary election, the party fielded Sejm lists in four constituencies and one candidate to the Senate. Its Siedlce constituency list included members of the Front party with Krzysztof Tołwiński as the list leaders. It received 0.02% of the vote. The Senate candidate achieved last place in his constituency with 1.27%.

In the 2024 Polish local elections, the party registered lists to 10 voivodeship sejmiks, eight gmina councils, and a mayoral candidate in gmina Wiżajny (Józef Laskowski). In sejmiks it received 0.6% of the nationwide vote with the highest support in Greater Poland (1.43%). It did not receive any sejmik seats. However it obtained one seat in gmina Kazanów council.

In the 2024 European Parliament election, the party registered lists in five constituencies. Aside from Normal Country members and independents it included one Silesians Together member and one New Hope member. The committee received 0.17% of the votes.

In April 2025, members of Normal Country went to Grodno together with Tołwiński. One of the party members, Piotr Łuczaj, was a guest of the pro-Lukashenko Radio Belarus. Tołwiński, known for his pro-Lukashenko and pro-Russian views, was the party's candidate in the 2023 election, and was a member of Normal Country at some point.

In the 2025 Polish presidential election, the party registered its chairman, Wiesław Lewicki, as the presidential candidate. The party submitted the required 100,000 signatures to the National Electoral Commission; however, the commission refused to register Lewicki, citing numerous irregularities in signatures, such as 6,000 of the signatures coming from deceased persons.

The party registered its own electoral committee in the November 2026 Zielona Góra by-election after the death of senator Mirosław Różański. The party presented Maria Branicka-Łosińska as its candidate. However, the party ultimately failed to register her as the candidate.

The party was mentioned in the investigation of the 2026 Kraków shooting, as it was found that the perpetrator's parents (whom the perpetrator murdered prior to committing the shooting) served in an electoral commission in the 2023 parliamentary election on behalf of the party. The party released a statement clarifying that the perpetrator's parents were not members of the party, and the perpetrator was not associated with the party in any way. The party leadership also criticized the media for describing the party as right-wing.

== Ideology ==
The party has been described as right-wing, although the party strongly rejects this label, claiming to be neither left nor right-wing. The party states: "We firmly reject being labeled a far-right group. We do not place ourselves on the left-right axis, as we consider this division inaccurate in light of contemporary challenges. We do not identify with any of these directions. Our program is based on state sovereignty, the dignity of its citizens, freedom and responsibility, respect for one's own nation while simultaneously respecting other nations, and the state's ideological neutrality."

Its ideology has variously been described as conservative, Eurosceptic, liberal-conservative, nationalist, pro-Russian, anti-capitalist, as well as anti-NATO. Polish political Marcin Wałdoch classified it as a part of the Polish anti-NATO movement and noted the party's combination of cybernetic thought, anti-capitalism, and opposition to NATO. The party argues that Poles "are being denationalized in many aspects of their lives", and that the ongoing "geopolitical realignment" will benefit Poland in the long run, and states the restoration of Poland's internal and external sovereignty as its goal. On the GAL-TAN scale (Green Alternative Liberal vs. Traditional Authoritarian Nationalist, used to measure sociocultural views), the party has been classified as TAN.

The party opposes immigration, postulating accepting immigrants "only after thorough screening and on terms established by Polish citizens." It opposes introducing Euro in Poland, stating that doing so would lead to loss of Polish state sovereignty. The party also stresses the need to defend the country. It is open to cooperation with any movement committed to "national renewal". The party proposes to improve the Polish economy by introducing an income tax for all businesses and allying with China. In the 2023 Polish parliamentary election, the party fielded Krzysztof Tołwiński, the leader of the pro-Russian and pro-Lukashenko Front party, as the leader of its electoral list. In 2025, party member Piotr Łuczaj went to Grodno together with Tołwiński and was a guest of Radio Belarus.

Normal Country has derided welfare programs as an electoral "bribe", arguing that it fails to solve the unjust nature of the economy itself. Instead, the party postulates socialized ownership of the Poland's natural resources. It also states that every powiat in Poland should achieve food self-sufficiency, advocates that at least 15% of the population be on standby for defense operations, and to implement an infrastructure tax on every foreign business in Poland.

The party's platform advocates simplifying administration, self-determination, increasing cooperation with CEE and Asian countries (particularly China), independent judiciary, state-guaranteed medication access, reestablishment of teacher seminaries, abolition of tests in education, natural farming, enfranchisement of Poles with natural resources, preference of native resources and technologies, diversifying native energy sources, improving demographics, monetary sovereignty, ban on deficit spending, restrictions on foreign capital, income tax for all corporations, rebuilding of the processing industry and maintaining the role of critical infrastructure and army.

== Structure ==
Chairman:

- Wiesław Lewicki

Vice-chairman:

- Krzysztof Nagrabski

Secretary:

- Czesław Piszczek

Treasurer:

- Bartłomiej Gowin

== Election results ==
=== Sejm ===
| Election | Votes | % | Seats | +/– | Government |
|---|---|---|---|---|---|
| 2023 | 4,606 | 0.02 (#10) | 0 / 460 | New | Extra-parliamentary |

=== Senate ===
| Election | Votes | % | Seats | +/– | Government |
|---|---|---|---|---|---|
| 2023 | 2,177 | 0.01 | 0 / 100 | New | Extra-parliamentary |

=== European Parliament ===
| Election | Leader | Votes | % | Seats | +/– | EP Group |
|---|---|---|---|---|---|---|
| 2024 | Wiesław Lewicki | 20,308 | 0.17 (#8) | 0 / 53 | New | – |
| 2024 | In a joint list with ŚR, that didn't win any seat. | | | | | |

=== Regional assemblies ===
| Election | Votes | % | Seats | +/− |
|---|---|---|---|---|
| 2024 | 86,994 | 0.60 (#8) | 0 / 552 | New |

== Other parties ==
Politicians associated with Normal Country have registered other political parties.

| Translated Name | Polish Name | Chairman | Other board members | Applicants | Registration date | Registry number | Headquarters |
|---|---|---|---|---|---|---|---|
| Party of Freedom (previously Freedom Movement) | Partia Wolności (previously Freedom Movement) | Anna Karbowska (previously Wiesław Lewicki) | vice-chairman: Piotr Merda secretary: Jakub Albrecht treasurer: Robert Oleszczak | Wiesław Lewicki, Anna Karbowska, Robert Oleszczak | 6 July 2015 | 355 | ul. Oczapowskiego 2 lok. 74, Warsaw |
| Free Europe | Wolna Europa | Wiesław Lewicki | | Robert Oleszczak, Dominik Kowalski, Wiesław Lewicki | 21 September 2022 | 342 | ul. Rabsztyńska 15/3, Warsaw |
| Normal Poland | Normalna Polska | Wiesław Lewicki | vice-chairman: Marzena Tomaszczak other member: Krzysztof Nagrabski | Marzena Tomaszczak, Wiesław Lewicki, Krzysztof Nagrabski | 30 November 2023 | 461 | ul. Kazimierza Kruczkowskiego 1/5, Gdynia |
