= Liberal Poland – Entrepreneurs' Strike =

Liberal Poland – Entrepreneurs' Strike Polska Liberalna Strajk Przedsiębiorców
- Abbreviation: PL!SP
- Leader: Paweł Tanajno
- Founder: Paweł Tanajno
- Founded: 23 May 2021
- Split from: Direct Democracy
- Ideology: Libertarianism; Economic liberalism
- Political position: Centre to centre-right
- Colours: Yellow; Black
- Slogan: "Freedom" (Polish: Wolność)
- Sejm: 0 / 460
- Senate: 0 / 100

Website
- partia-strajk-przedsiebiorcow.pl

Liberal Poland – Entrepreneurs' Strike (PL!SP, Polish: Polska Liberalna Strajk Przedsiębiorców) is a Polish libertarian political party founded on 23 May 2021 by Paweł Tanajno.

== Ideology ==
According to the party, PL!SP is "a civil formation in which there is not a single politician". The party advocates economic liberal and libertarian ideas, claiming to fight for the rights of entrepreneurs, but claims to be different from the Confederation on women's and migrants' rights.

== History ==
Previously, Paweł Tanajno was associated with the Civic Platform, Palikot Movement, Kukiz'15 and Direct Democracy. The Entrepreneurs' Strike party began to form in 2020, Tanajno, as a presidential candidate, led the protest of entrepreneurs against the freezing of the economy due to the COVID-19 pandemic and ineffective, in their opinion, business assistance mechanisms.

The party was officially founded on 23 May 2021, and the party program was presented in Gdańsk.

The party was going to participate in the 2023 Polish parliamentary election. The election committee of the party was registered by the National Electoral Commission. However, the party withdrew their party list on October 13, 2023.

== Electoral results ==
=== Sejm ===
Election	Votes	%	Seats	+/–	Government
2023	Withdrew		0 / 460	New	Extra-parliamentary

=== European Parliament ===
Election	Leader	Votes	%	Seats	+/–	EP Group
2024	Paweł Tanajno	9,453	0.08 (#9)	0 / 53	New	–

=== Regional assemblies ===
Election year	Votes	%	Seats	+/–
2024	52,160	0.36 (#10)	0 / 552	New
