= Andrzej Buła =

Polish politician (born 1965)

Andrzej Buła MEP
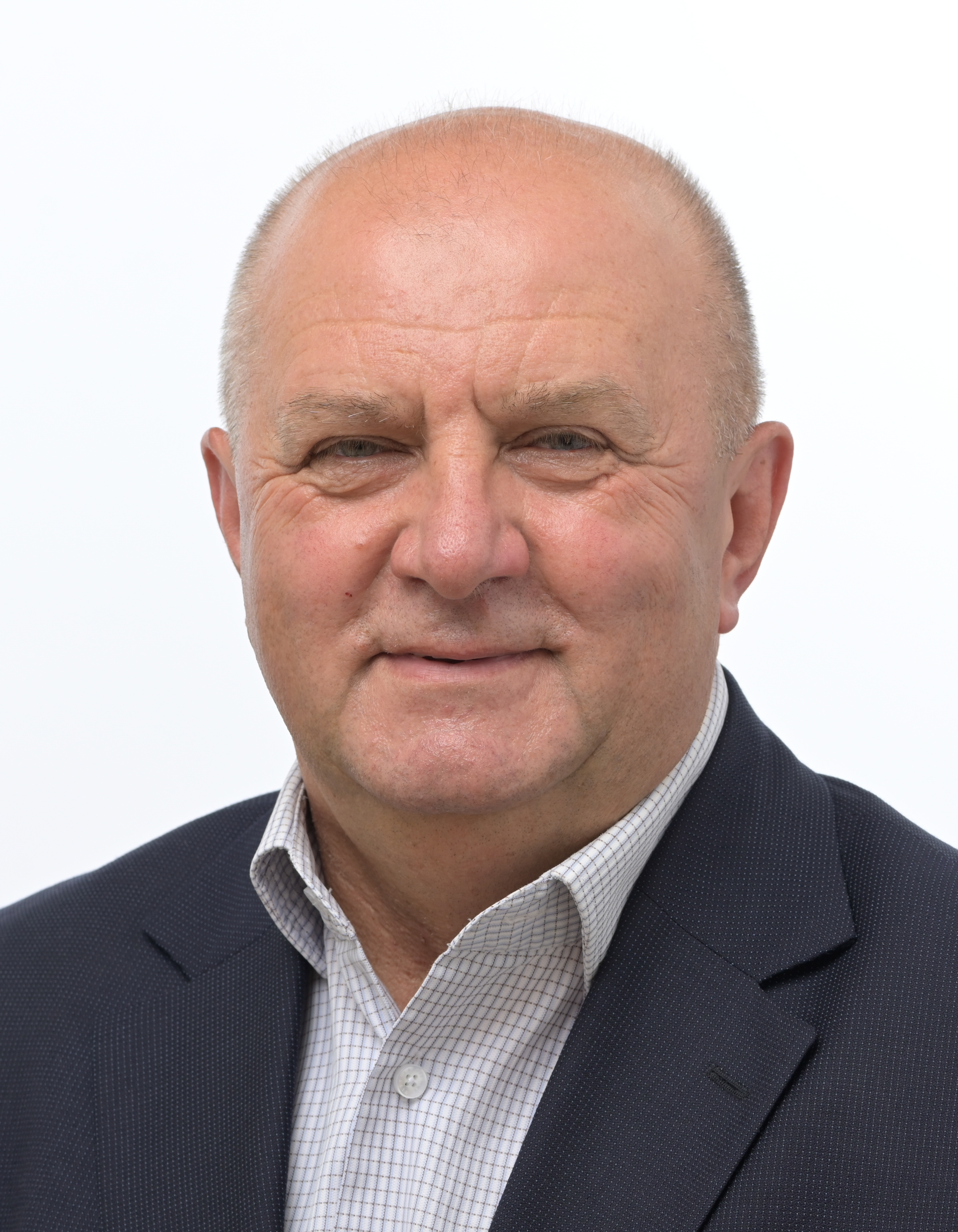
- Buła in 2024

Member of the European Parliament for Lower Silesian and Opole
- Incumbent
- Assumed office 16 July 2024

Personal details
- Born: 28 August 1965 (age 60)
- Party: Civic Platform
- Other political affiliations: European People's Party

Andrzej Buła (born 28 August 1965) is a Polish politician of the Civic Platform who was elected member of the European Parliament in 2024. He served as marshal of Opole Voivodeship from 2013 to 2024, and as a member of the Sejm from 2007 to 2013.
