= Wiesław Lewicki =

Polish politician

Personal details
- Born: 1971 (age 54–55) Łodygowice, Poland
- Party: Normal Country
- Other political affiliations: Republicans association (formerly); Congress of the New Right (formerly)

Wiesław Lewicki is a Polish politician and leader of the Normal Country party.

== Biography ==
Wiesław Lewicki was born in 1971 in Łodygowice. He is a small businessman.

Lewicki used to be the vice-chairman of Janusz Korwin-Mikke's Congress of the New Right. As part of the Congress' activities, he filed a motion to disband the City Guard of Żywiec in 2013. Later, he joined the Republicans association of Przemysław Wipler, from which he led a split in 2015, leading to the foundation of the party Normal Country.

Lewicki contested several elections. In 2023, he contested a seat in Sejm Constituency no. 33, winning 238 votes (0.04%). In 2024, he ran for a seat in the Silesian Voivodeship Sejmik, winning 111 votes (0.05%). He declared his candidacy in the 2020 and 2025 presidential elections, failing to register for the former but delivering 100,000 signatures and submitting his registration for the latter. However, his registration was rejected.

== Electoral history ==
=== Sejm ===
Election year	Party	# of votes	% of vote	District	Elected?
2023	Normal Country	238	0.04%	Sejm Constituency no. 33	No

=== Regional assemblies ===
Election year	Party	# of votes	% of vote	Sejmik	Elected?
2024	Normal Country	111	0.05%	Silesian	No
