= Piotr Kowal =

Polish politician (born 1992)

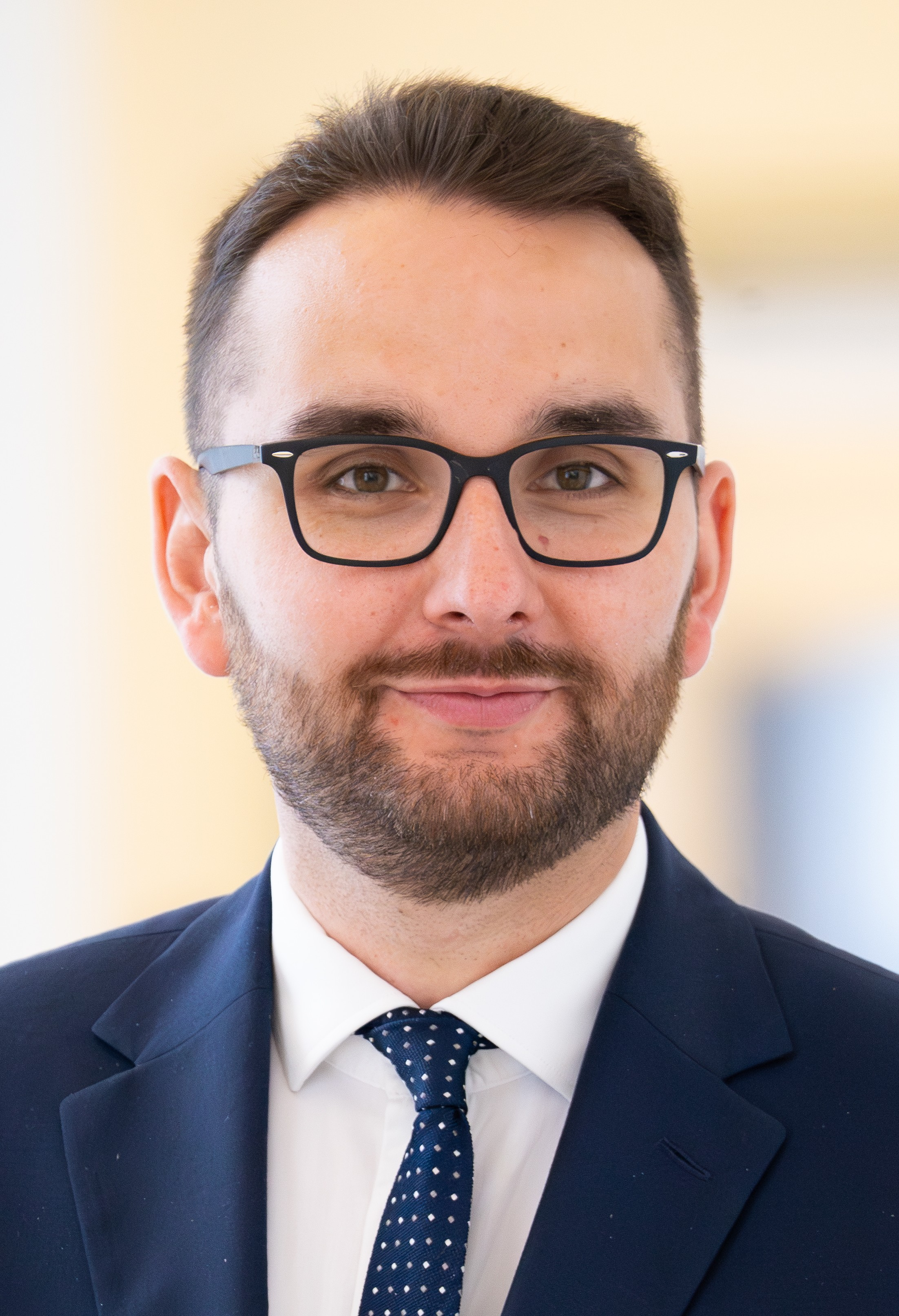
- Kowal in 2024

Member of the Sejm
- Incumbent
- Assumed office 26 June 2024
- Preceded by: Joanna Scheuring-Wielgus
- Constituency: Toruń

Personal details
- Born: 5 November 1992 (age 33)
- Party: New Left

Piotr Kowal (born 5 November 1992) is a Polish politician of the New Left. He has served as a member of the Sejm since 2024, when he succeeded Joanna Scheuring-Wielgus. He was previously chairman of the city council of Włocławek.
