= Farmers from the Baltic to the Tatras =

Farmers from the Baltic to the Tatras Polish: Rolnicy od Bałtyku do Tatr
- Abbreviation: RBT
- Chairman: Henryk Połcik
- Vice-Chairmen: Andrzej Bęben; Mariusz Woźniak
- Secretary: Jerzy Strząska
- Treasurer: Paweł Stąporek
- Founder: Andrzej Bęben
- Founded: 18 April 2024
- Registered: 24 April 2024
- Headquarters: Łukawka 28, 27-532 Wojciechowice
- Ideology: Peasant movement
- Colours: Green
- Slogan: Decalogue the guide of the farmers (Polish: Dekalog drogowskazem rolników)
- Sejm: 0 / 460
- Senate: 0 / 100
- European Parliament: 0 / 51
- Regional assemblies: 0 / 552
- City presidents: 0 / 107
- Powiat Councils: 0 / 6,170
- Gmina Councils: 0 / 39,416

Website
- www.rolnicy-rbt.pl

The Farmers from the Baltic to the Tatras (Polish: Rolnicy od Bałtyku do Tatr, RBT) is a Polish electoral committee registered for the 2024 European Parliament election in Poland. It was founded on 18 April 2024 and registered on 24 April. Before being registered, it was called to correct irregularities found during the registration of the committee by the National Electoral Commission. Its founders are farmers from a small village of Wojciechowice in Opatów County, in Eastern Poland. It was considered one of the agrarian electoral committees founded by farmers in wake of the 2024 Polish farmers' protests, where Polish farmers protested against the policies of the European Union. The demands of the protesting farmers include abolishing or reforming the European Green Deal, along with preventing the entrance of Ukrainian grain and sugar into Polish markets.

In its program, the electoral committee puts heavy emphasis on the development of hydroelectricity in Poland, believing that if developed, it could cover most of the Polish electricity demand. It also proposes reforms that would make the European Union more supportive of agriculture and farmers. It postulates the implementation of waterway projects in Poland that would then be integrated into larger European waterway systems. The proposals of the Farmers from the Baltic to the Tatras also include training for African farmers and an internship program that would enable them to undergo training on European farms, along with modernization of Polish healthcare system that would improve healthcare access in the Polish countryside. The committee believes that the post-1989 capitalist reforms in Poland failed the Polish countryside, resulting in rural poverty and lack of healthcare.

== Background ==
Since February 2024, Polish farmers had been organizing nationwide protests, with general demands being to abolish or reform the European Union regulations introduced by the European Green Deal, along with the implementation of protectionist measures that would cease the import of Ukrainian grain and sugar into Polish markets. Protesting farmers argued that the prices of the agricultural products have become so low that farming is no longer a sustainable profession in Poland. Research from March 2024 found that only 30% of Polish farmers earned a monthly income above the minimum wage. The poverty amongst Polish farmers had been steadily growing ever since the late 2000s, which was escalated by the 2011 law that forced the purchase of leased land and indebtedness of many farmers.

The situation in the Polish countryside was further worsened and declined rapidly in 2018, as the 2018 drought affected more than 2.2 million hectares of land and caused losses of around 900 million PLN to Polish farms. Crop failure combined with the African swine fever virus rendered farming unprofitable in Poland, causing radical and anti-government sentiment in the countryside. In wake of this, many radical agrarian parties emerged in Poland, such as AGROunia and the Peasants' Party. These parties were inspired by the 1990s far-left Samoobrona movement, a rural trade union and a party that became known for its radical tactics, such as clashes with the police. Its willingness to assault police officers and debt collectors became an important factor in the radicalization of the Polish countryside.

== History ==
The Farmers from the Baltic to the Tatras was founded on 18 April 2024 in a small village of Wojciechowice located in Eastern Poland. As of 2024, the village was home to around 300 people. The village was place of the 2024 Polish farmers' protests, and additionally there was a political protest in Wojciechowice in April 2024, as the mayor of the village was re-elected by a single vote in the 2024 Polish local elections. Because the margin of mayor's victory was one vote, the result of the election had to be decided by the court.

On 22 April 2024, the National Electoral Commission found irregularities in the registration process of the Farmers from the Baltic to the Tatras, and requested a correction. The electoral committee was formally registered for the election two days later, on 24 April 2024. The electoral representative of the committee was Andrzej Bęben, while the treasurer was Paweł Stąporek. The leader of the party became Henryk Połcik, with the electoral representative of the RBT, Andrzej Bęben, being one of the vice-chairmen.

The Farmers from the Baltic to the Tatras was considered to be a part of the larger electoral action by Polish farmers sparked by the 2024 Polish farmers' protests, where Polish farmers protested against the policies of the European Union as well as the sharp decline of grain prices in Poland attributed to the presence of Ukrainian grain in Polish markets. However, the electoral committee of the Farmers from the Baltic to the Tatras was considered unlikely to gain any seats to the European Parliament, given the 5% electoral threshold as well as presence of numerous other agrarian electoral committees in the Polish election.

In May 2024, the formation argued that the electoral law for the European Parliament elections in Poland is unfair and bureaucratized, as electoral committees are "discriminated against in political life" in contrast to well-established, nationwide political parties. Non-partisan electoral committees are required to collect 1,000 signatures in order to be registered; moreover, candidates list for each constituency requires signatures of at least 10,000 voters permanently residing in the constituency. Political parties, however, have no such requirements. According to the Farmers from the Baltic to the Tatras, this makes it "practically impossible to submit lists".

On 25 May, the electoral committee announced that it was unable to submit candidate lists to any of the constituencies because the signature requirements made it run out of time. The party wrote a letter requesting the President of Poland Andrzej Duda to allocate more time to the committees that are required to collect signatures, as it constitutes an additional electoral activity that the Election Code requires without providing time necessary to do so. On 1 June 2024, the Farmers from the Baltic to the Tatras officially submitted an application in the Office of the President to postpone the European Parliament elections in Poland in order to accommodate this additional electoral activity. The committee argued that this constitutes a form of inequality, as party committees do not have this requirement and thus have more time for electoral activities.

Ultimately, the application was ignored and the election took place on 9 June 2024 as planned. On 19 June, the committee submitted a motion to invalidate European Parliament elections to the Supreme Court of Poland, arguing that the electoral calendar makes it practically impossible for voters' electoral committees to participate in the election by requiring them to carry out an additional task in the form of collecting signatures without providing time necessary to do so. The committee argued that this essentially restricts electoral participation to well-established political parties only. Public Polish Press Agency reported that the motion of the Farmers from the Baltic to the Tatras was received by the Supreme Court, along with 8 other such motions that likewise called for the election to be invalidated on similar grounds.

== Program ==
The electoral program of the Farmers from the Baltic to the Tatras mainly postulates a greater role of rivers in the economies of European Union states, a training program for African farmers, as well as reforms to the agricultural law of the European Union. The electoral committee promotes hydroelectricity and argues that electricity generated from the hydroelectric power plants in the river basins of Vistula and Oder can cover a significant proportion of Poland's electricity needs. The slogan of the electoral committee is Decalogue the guide of the farmers (Polish: Dekalog drogowskazem rolników).

It proposes the implementation of the Baltic Sea-Black Sea waterway project Vistula-San-Dniester-Prut-Danube plan drafted by Polish professor Maksymilian Matakiewicz in 1927, which would be integrated into the waterway system of the European Union. The RBT believes that Vistula "may in the near future become a blessing for our people who have been oppressed for so long". The electoral committee makes references to the Polish interwar philosopher Roman Ingarden, claiming to be following his ideal of cherishing and developing the Polish special relationships with its rivers and sea access.

The Farmers from the Baltic to the Tatras also proposes a training program for the farmers of Africa, which would be based on a similar training project for the farmers of Africa, Asia and Latin America organised by the United Nations during the Cold War. The training is to be organized by Poland and other states of the European Union and include training advisors to assist the farmers; the final stage of the training program would include granting the trainees several-month internships in Polish farms. The trained African farmers would then become "ambassadors for Polish agricultural products".

The committee also puts a heavy emphasis on development of healthcare and the improvement of healthcare access in the Polish countryside. The Farmers from the Baltic to the Tatras proposes online and home-based rehabilitation programs, especially in places where clinics are not available. It also envisions the creation of "medical kiosks" in Polish villages, which would have appropriate diagnostic equipment to enable direct consultation with doctors via video conferencing. The leader of the committee, Henry Połcik, is heavily critical of the consequences of the post-1989 transformation of Poland into a capitalist free-market state, noting the widespread rural poverty and lack of appropriate healthcare in rural areas.

== See also ==
- AGROunia
- Self-Defence of the Republic of Poland
- Polish People's Party
- Peasants' Party
- 2024 Polish farmers' protests
