= Paweł Tanajno =

Polish entrepreneur and politician

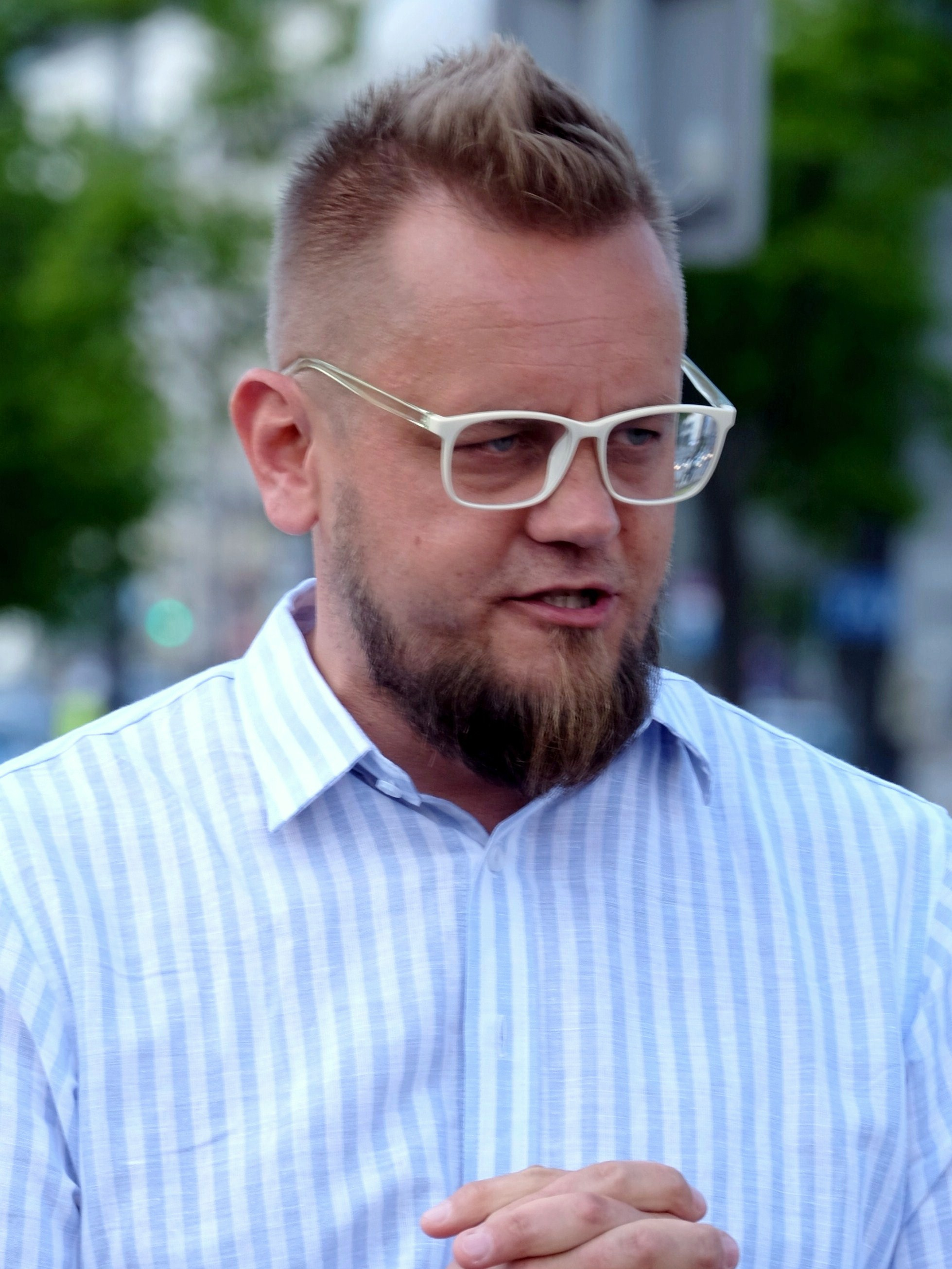
- Tanajno in 2020

Personal details
- Born: 17 December 1975 (age 50) Warsaw, Poland
- Party: Liberal Poland – Entrepreneurs' Strike
- Education: Nicolaus Copernicus University in Toruń (uncertain)

Paweł Jan Tanajno (born 17 December 1975) is a Polish entrepreneur and politician.

== Biography ==
He studied law at Nicolaus Copernicus University in Toruń and holds a degree in marketing. From 1995 to 2004 he ran a computer company Sferis. He was also a member of foundations and a member of board of three other companies. He works as internet marketing specialist.

From 2002 to 2003, Tanajno was a member of Civic Platform. He collaborated with Palikot's Movement but ended it due to financial inconsistencies in the party. He became a member of Direct Democracy in 2012 and served as party's spokesperson.

Tanajno was DB's candidate in the May 2015 presidential election. He gained 29,785 votes (0.2% overall) which placed him at 11th position among 11 candidates. He unsuccessfully ran for member of Sejm from Kukiz'15 list in October 2015. In 2018, he was a candidate in Warsaw mayoral election, obtaining 3,745 votes (0.42% overall) which placed him at 11th position among 14 candidates. Then, he was a candidate in 2020 Polish presidential election, obtaining 27,909 votes (0.14% overall) which placed him at 9th position among 11 candidates.

In September 2020, he joined the Inequality March event organised by members of the libertarian Youth of the Future (Młodzież Przyszłości) association in central Warsaw, which combined pride flags with Gadsden flags. According to the activists, the protest was directed against gender assignment at birth, lack of recognition of gay marriage and fixed retirement age under Polish law, as well as against patriarchal culture which they said contributed to high suicide rates among Polish men. Tanajno expressed his support for the young protesters' liberal slogans:

We have become accustomed in Poland to the idea that only the left wing stands up for gay rights, and that the political scene is divided along the traditional left–right lines. For many years, younger generations have been led astray under the banner of freedom and steered towards extreme conservatism. I would like emerging new liberal parties not to become divided among themselves. I will certainly support such initiatives, because this is the future.

Having led public demonstrations demanding greater financial support to businesses during the COVID-19 pandemic, he founded the libertarian Liberal Poland – Entrepreneurs' Strike party in May 2021. He claimed that his party was the first genuinely liberal party to emerge in Poland in a quarter of a century.

In January 2025, he declared his participation in 2025 Polish presidential election. In April 2025 Polish Electoral Commission refused to register him as a candidate in 2025 Polish presidential election.

== Views ==
Tanajno professed libertarian political views in 2020.

Asked directly about his political stances, he described them as progressive, civic-minded, anti-authoritarian, freedom-oriented. He also declared himself a supporter of a secular state and of the most liberal proposed law on in-vitro fertilisation in Poland.

While upholding Janusz Korwin-Mikke's right-libertarian economic views, he distanced himself from the latter's cultural conservatism. He accepted a comparison of his political path to Donald Trump's on the basis of a similar caveat, emphasising his support for a liberal state.
