= Marcin Sypniewski =

Polish politician (born 1979)

Marcin Sypniewski MEP
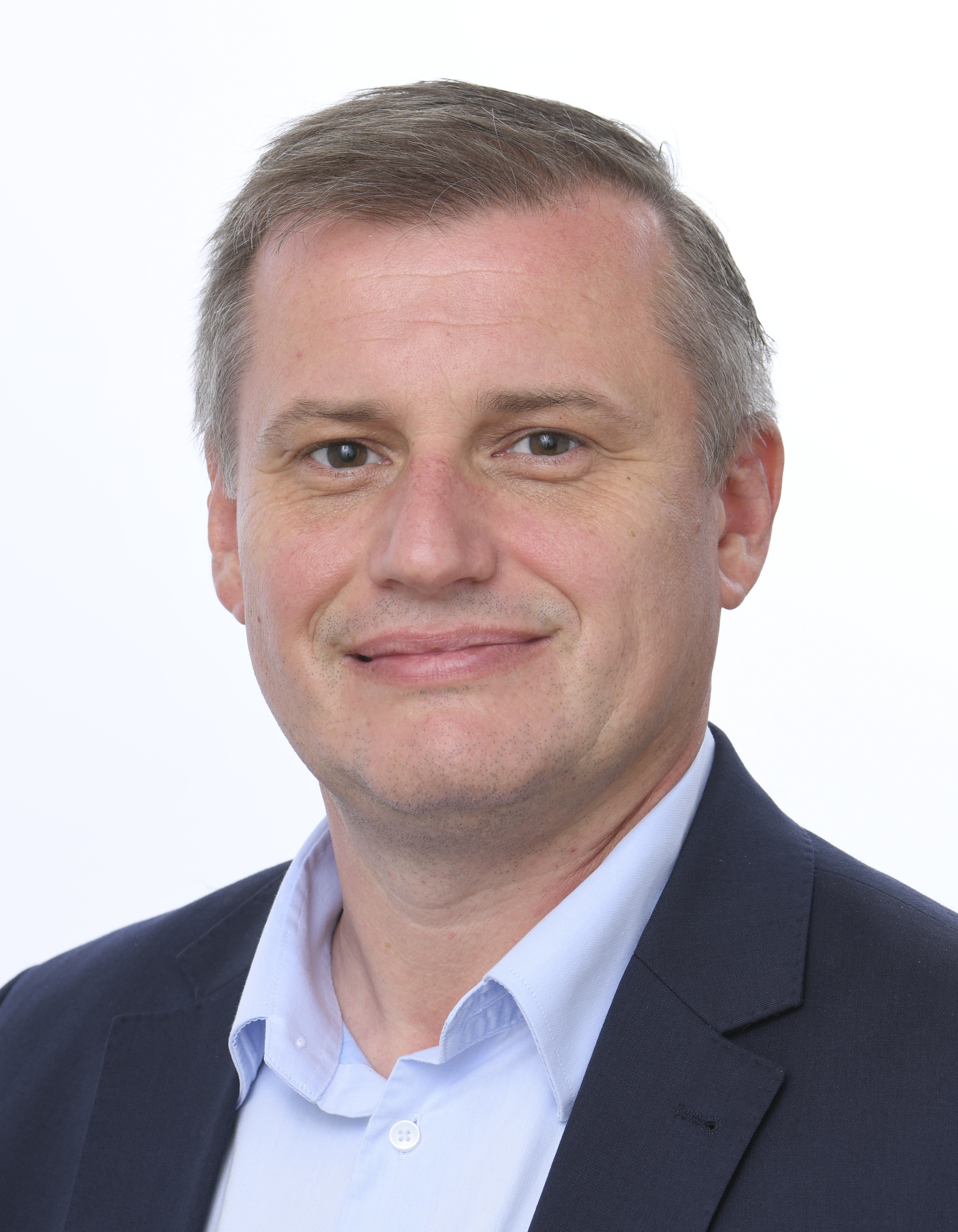
- Sypniewski in 2024

Member of the European Parliament for Silesia
- Incumbent
- Assumed office 16 July 2024

Personal details
- Born: 30 January 1979 (age 47) Bydgoszcz, Poland
- Party: New Hope
- Other political affiliations: Confederation Liberty and Independence; Europe of Sovereign Nations

Marcin Sypniewski (born 30 January 1979) is a Polish lawyer and politician of the New Hope who was elected member of the European Parliament in 2024. He serves as chairman of the party's national council.

== Biography ==
Sypniewski was born in Bydgoszcz, Poland. He attended Cyprian Kamil Norwid High School Nr.1 in Bydgoszcz. After that he studied law at the University of Gdańsk, wehre he earned his law degree. From 2007 to 2011 he has been a Member of the supervisory board of the municipal company Administracja Domów Miejskich (ADM) in Bydgoszcz.

Sypniewski is married and has three children.
