= Anna Bryłka =

Polish politician (born 1990)

Anna Bryłka MEP
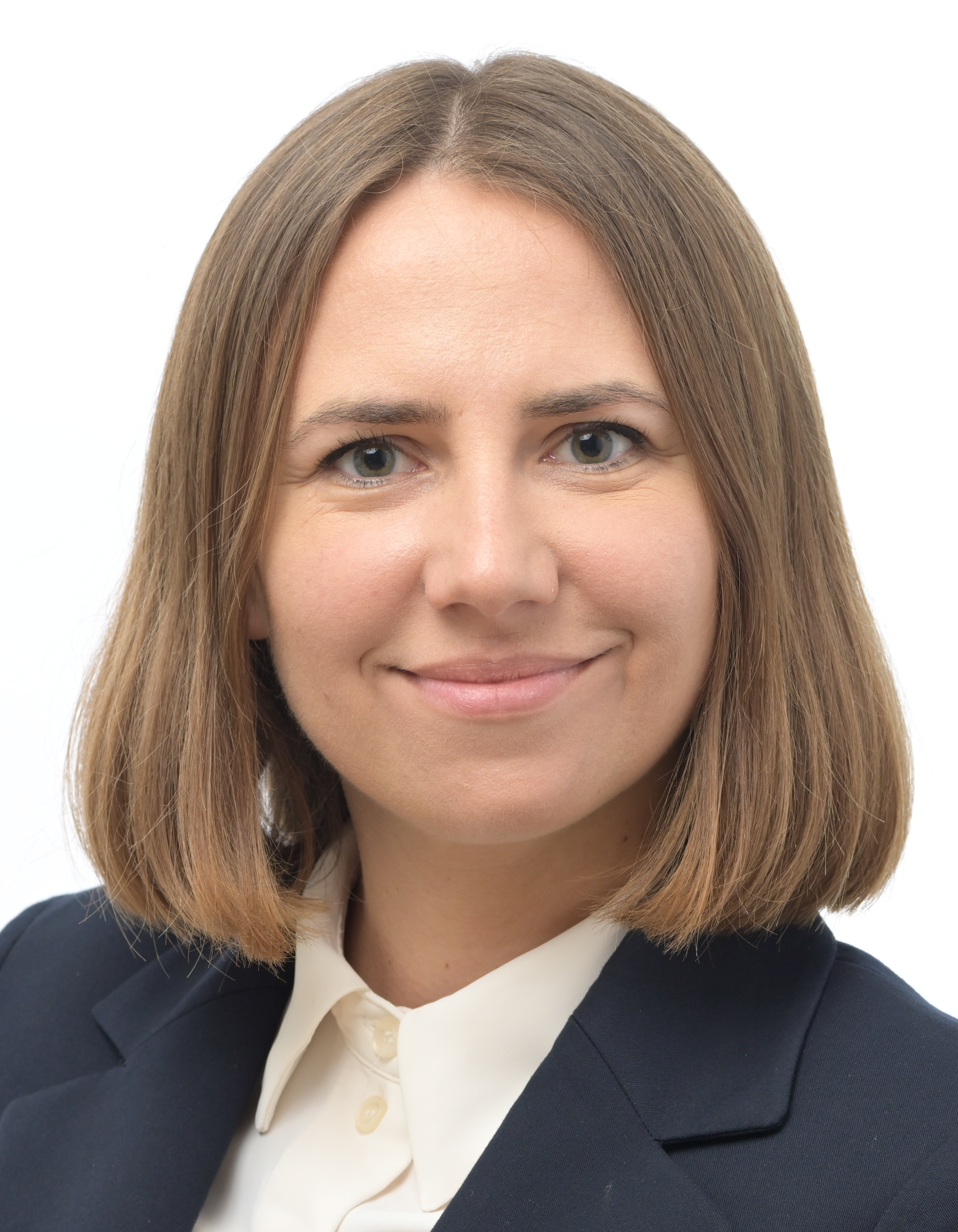
- Official portrait, 2024

Member of the European Parliament for Greater Poland
- Incumbent
- Assumed office 16 July 2024

Personal details
- Born: 3 September 1990 (age 36) Koło, Poland
- Party: National Movement
- Other political affiliations: Confederation Freedom and Independence
- Education: Adam Mickiewicz University (Lic.); University of Warsaw (Mgr.); Warsaw School of Economics (Pg. dip)

Anna Mirosława Bryłka (born 1 September 1990) is a Polish politician and lawyer who has been elected as Member of the European Parliament of the 10th term.

== Biography ==
She graduated in law and history from Adam Mickiewicz University in Poznań and in international relations from the University of Warsaw, where in 2016 she defended her master's thesis. She also completed postgraduate studies in foreign trade at the SGH Warsaw School of Economics.

She serves as vice-president of the National Movement. She also previously served as the party's secretary. Until December 2023, she was also the spokesperson for the Confederation.

In 2018, she unsuccessfully ran for the Greater Poland Regional Assembly, and in 2019 she ran for the European Parliament elections. In the 2019 and 2023 parliamentary elections, she was the lead candidate for the Confederation in the Konin district.

She serves as the Vice President of the National Movement. Previously, she also held the position of secretary of this party. Until December 2023, she was also the spokesperson for the Confederation. She is the author of the Confederation's and National Movement's programs on agriculture and the European Union.

In 2024, she ran again in the European Parliament elections, receiving 111,420 votes (the second-highest number among Confederation candidates and the fourth-highest in the district), and secured a mandate. In the European Parliament, she joined the Committee on International Trade.
