= Tomasz Buczek =

Polish politician (born 1986)

Tomasz Buczek MEP
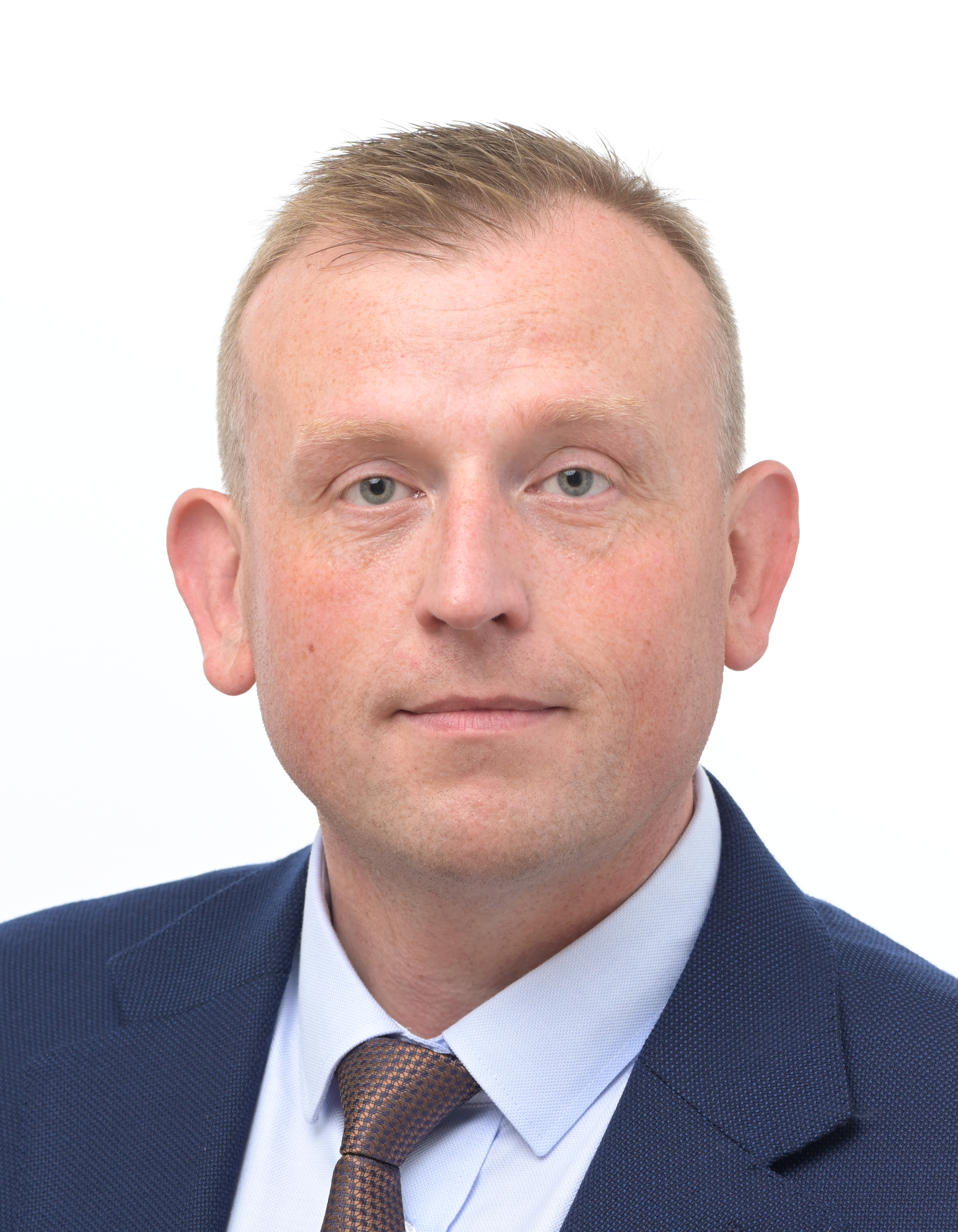

Member of the European Parliament for Subcarpathia
- Incumbent
- Assumed office 16 July 2024

Personal details
- Born: 24 April 1986 (age 39) Kolbuszowa, Poland
- Party: National Movement
- Other political affiliations: Confederation Liberty and Independence

Tomasz Wojciech Buczek (born 24 April 1986) is a Polish politician of the National Movement who was elected member of the European Parliament in 2024.

== Early life and career ==
Buczek was born in Kolbuszowa in 1986. He previously served as vice president of the All-Polish Youth in Subcarpathian Voivodeship. In the 2014 Polish local elections, he was the lead candidate of the National Movement in the third district for the Subcarpathian Voivodeship Sejmik. He ran again in the 2018 local elections, as well as the 2019 European Parliament election and the 2019 and 2023 elections to the Sejm. He is the leader of the National Movement in Subcarpathian Voivodeship, and one of the leaders of Confederation in the voivodeship.
