= Direct Democracy (Polish political party) =

- Founded: 2012
- Dissolved: 2022
- Ideology: Direct democracy E-democracy; Populism

Direct Democracy (Polish: Demokracja Bezpośrednia) was a Polish political party founded in 2012. Its goal was to change the Polish political system by moving it closer to the political concept of direct democracy.

The party's creation has been inspired by the 2012 protests against ACTA.
