= Maciej Wąsik =

Polish politician (born 1969)

Maciej Wąsik MEP
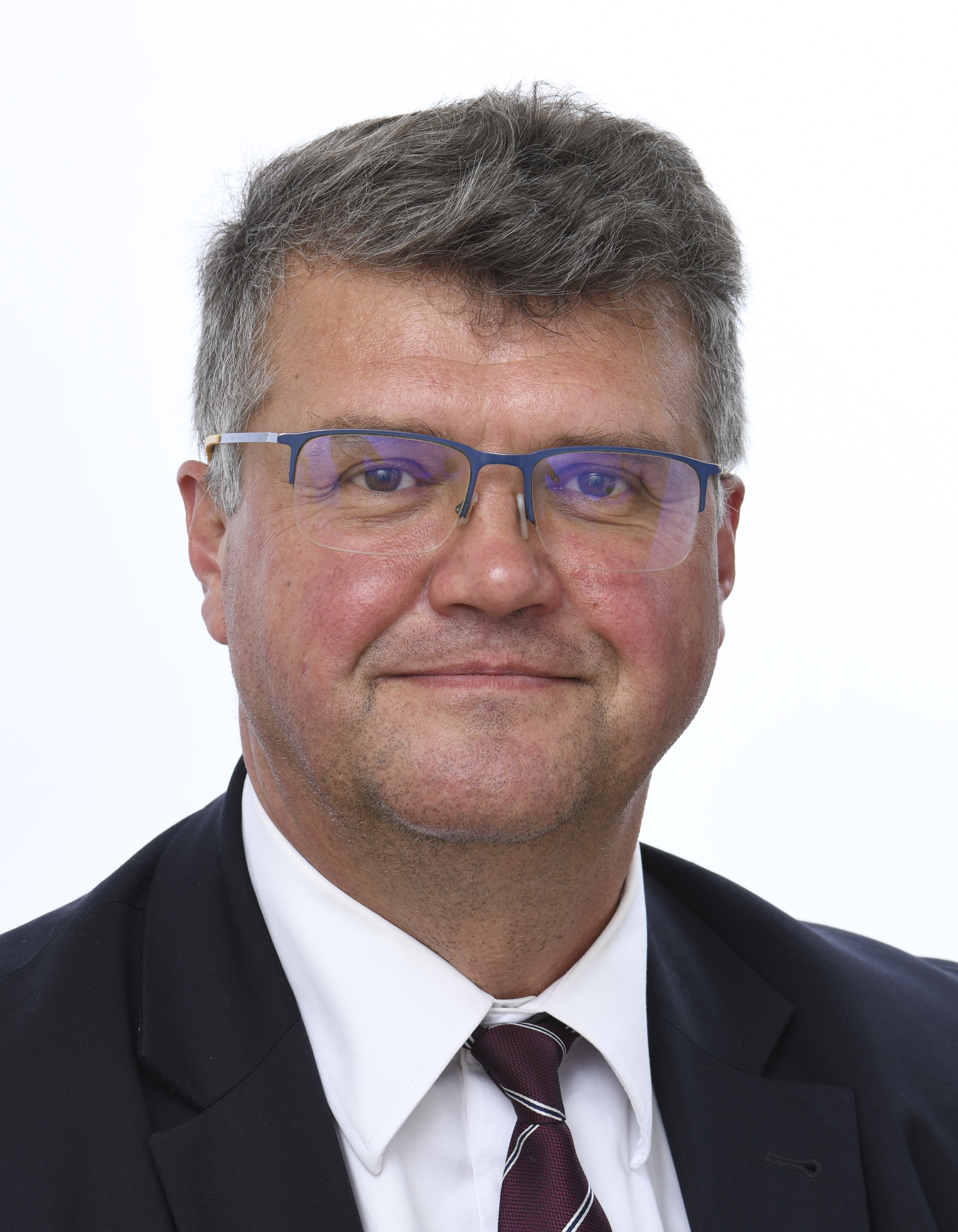

Member of the European Parliament
- Incumbent
- Assumed office 16 July 2024

Secretary of State of the Ministry of Interior and Administration
- In office 25 November 2019 – 2023
- President: Andrzej Duda
- Prime Minister: Mateusz Morawiecki

Personal details
- Born: 16 October 1969 Warsaw, Poland
- Education: University of Warsaw

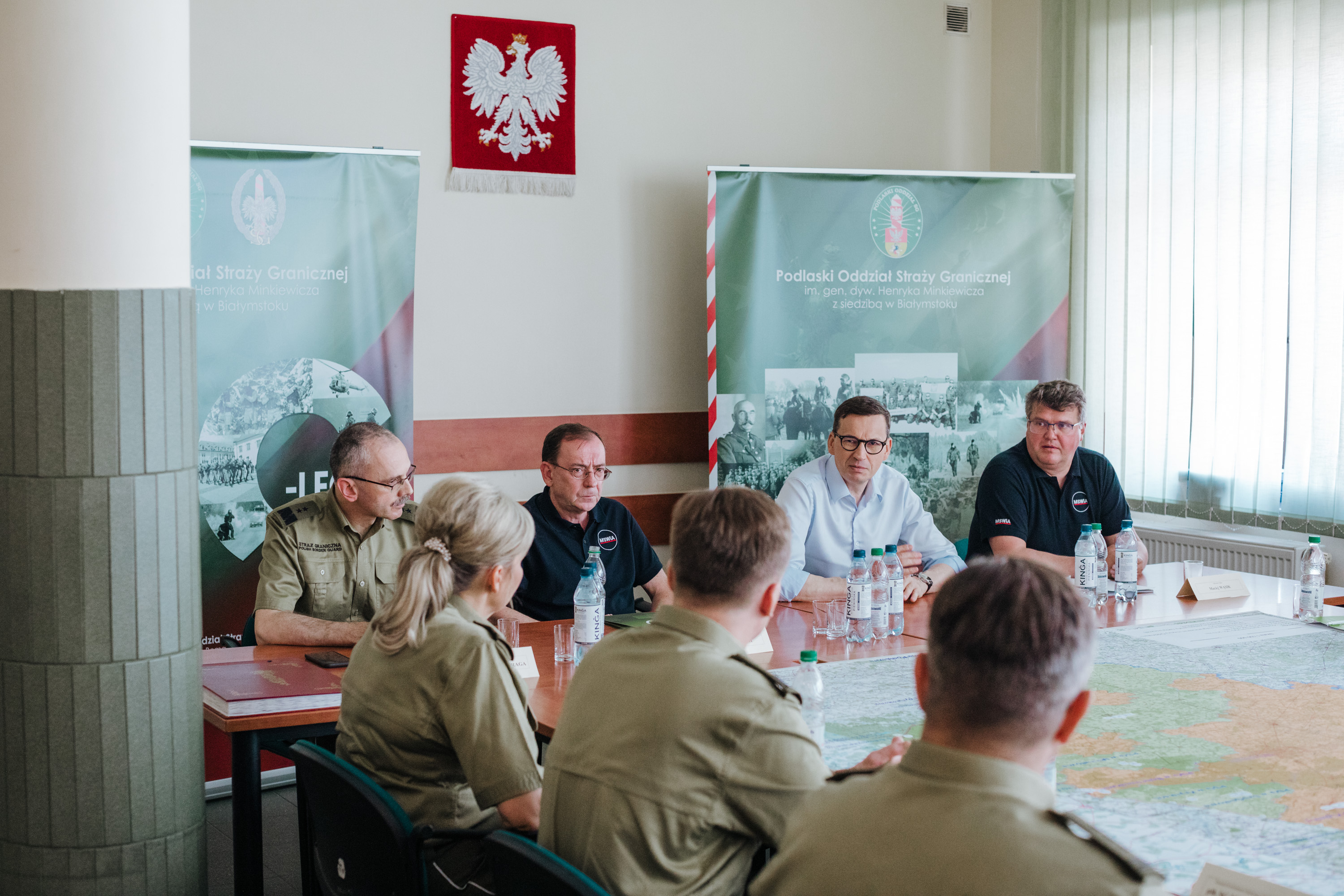
At a meeting in Kuźnica on 30 June 2022 regarding the building of a wall along the border between Poland and Belarus: interior minister Mariusz Kamiński (center-left midground), prime minister Mateusz Morawiecki (center-right midground), and Wąsik (right midground)

Maciej Roman Wąsik (born 16 October 1969 in Warsaw, Poland) is a Polish politician who served as Secretary of State of the Ministry of Interior and Administration from 2019 to 2023, under Prime Minister Mateusz Morawiecki.

Wąsik also served as a member of the Sejm, representing the constituency of Płock, from 12 November 2015 until 20 December 2023, when his mandate expired due to his being sentenced to prison for an intentional crime.

== Early life and education ==
Wąsik was born in Warsaw. He earned a magister degree in 1994 from the faculty of history at the University of Warsaw, where he studied archaeology.

== Career ==
Wąsik co-founded Poland's Central Anticorruption Bureau, where he served as the deputy head from 2006 to 2009, under head Mariusz Kamiński. In 2009, Wąsik and Kamiński were accused of abusing their power by allowing subordinates to use entrapment when investigating a political opponent, Andrzej Lepper, who later killed himself.

The two were found guilty in 2015 and sentenced to three years in prison, but were pardoned by President Andrzej Duda a few months later, before their appeal was decided. Legal experts questioned whether the pardon was valid if it was granted before all possible avenues of appeal were exhausted, and the Supreme Court overturned the pardon on 6 June 2023.
