= Radio Belarus =

Radio station

- Country: Belarus

Ownership
- Owner: Belarusian Television and Radio Company
- Key people: Naum Galperovich (Director); Viacheslav Laktjushin (Head of Dept. of Foreign Languages Service)

History
- Launch date: 11 May 1962; 64 years ago
- Former names: Radio Minsk

Coverage
- Availability: International

Links
- Webcast: www.tvr.by/live-broadcast/#radiolive
- Website: www.tvr.by/radio/radio-belarus/

Radio Belarus (Belarusian: Радыё "Беларусь") is the official international broadcasting station of Belarus. The station ceased broadcasting on shortwave and mediumwave as of 1 April 2016.

== History ==
Radio Belarus broadcast on the international shortwave bands since 11 May 1962. Originally the programs were broadcast in Belarusian. In 1985, broadcasting in German was launched, and in 1998 they began broadcasting Russian and English versions. Since 2006, the radio has started broadcasting in Polish, while 2010 saw the launch of French and Spanish language programming. Programming in Chinese started in 2013 and in Arabic in 2017.

The station used to offer 16 hours of radio content in nine languages and 10 hours of real-time online English programming daily.

== Radio Belarus features ==
- News and information-analytical shows
- Radio interviews with statesmen, politicians, public and religious figures; scientists, writers and musicians, masters of art and folklore; sportsmen
- Programs about history, culture, and spiritual values of Belarusians

The radio carries shows about different aspects of Belarusian life and human interest stories about ordinary Belarusian families. Priority in music policy is examples of folk, classical, and modern Belarusian music.

=== Former shortwave band ===
- 14:00–02:00 local time (11:00–23:00 UTC) at 7390, 7360 kHz
- 20:05–02:00 local time (17:05–23:00 UTC) at 6155 kHz

=== Former medium wave band ===
- 22:00–02:00 local time (19:00–23:00 UTC) at 1170 kHz

=== FM transmitters and frequencies ===
- Brest – 96.4 MHz
- Grodno – 96.9 MHz
- Svislach – 100.8 MHz
- Heraniony – 99.9 MHz
- Braslaw – 106.6 MHz
- Miadzel – 102.0 MHz

== Internet broadcasting ==
Radio "Belarus" started on-line Internet broadcasts in the English language on January 3, 2005. On September 1, 2005, it increased the air time from 5 to 10 hours, including two 5-hour blocks.

=== Online broadcasting schedule ===
- On-line: 02:00–07:00, 15:00–20:00 local time
- Rerun: 07:00–12:00, 12:00–14:00, 20:00–01:00 local time
