= Joanna Scheuring-Wielgus =

Polish politician (born 1972)

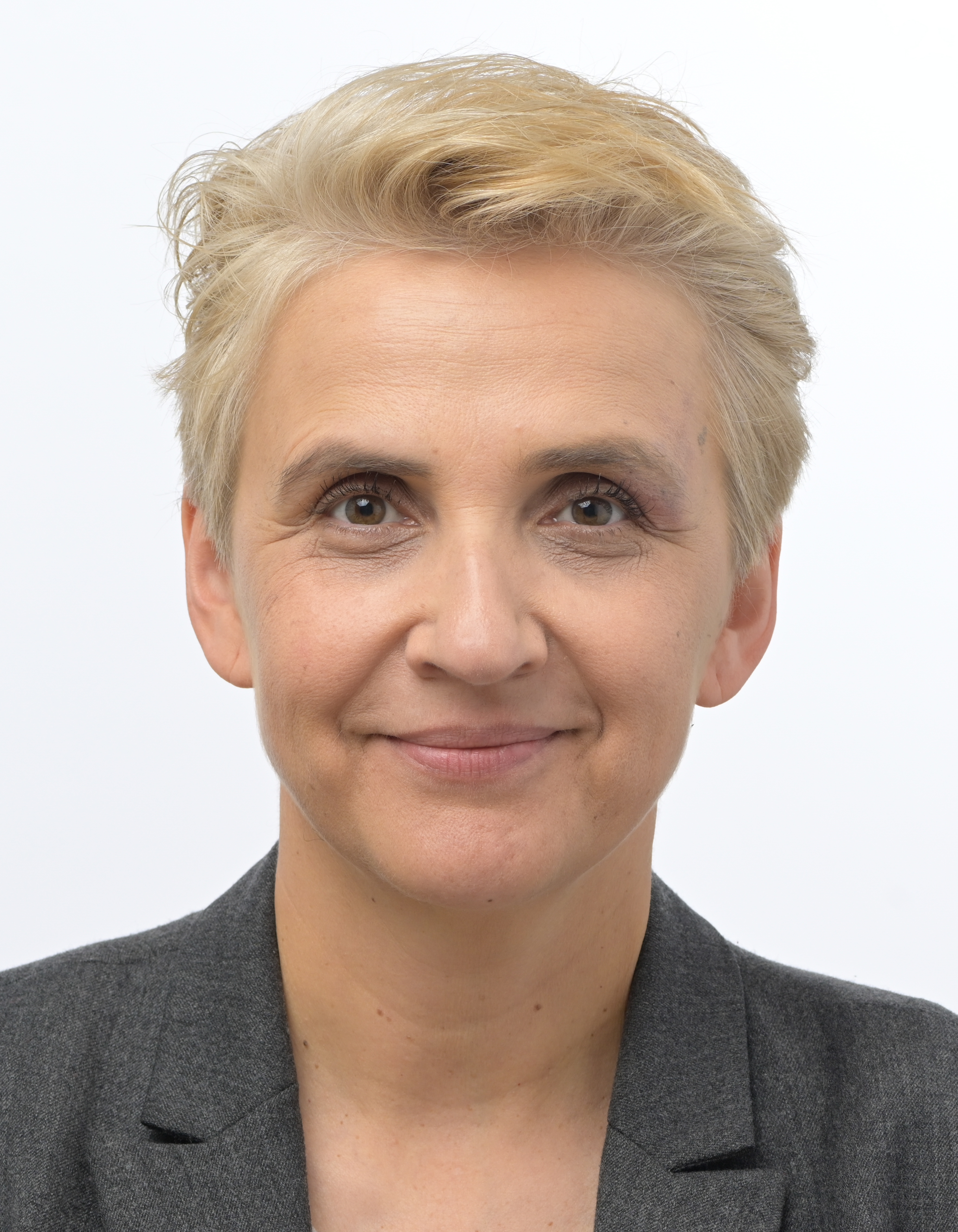
- Scheuring-Wielgus in 2024

Member of the European Parliament
- Incumbent
- Assumed office 16 July 2024
- Constituency: Greater Poland

Member of the Sejm
- In office 12 November 2015 – 10 June 2024
- Constituency: 5-Toruń

Personal details
- Born: 8 February 1972 (age 54) Toruń, Poland
- Party: Modern (2015–2018); Now! (2018–2019); Spring (2019-2021); New Left (since 2021)
- Other political affiliations: The Left (since 2019); Progressive Alliance of Socialists and Democrats (since 2024)

Joanna Scheuring-Wielgus (born 8 February 1972) is a Polish politician. She is a member of the Sejm for The Left political coalition. In December 2023, she was appointed a secretary of state in the Ministry of Culture and National Heritage.

Since 2024, Scheuring-Wielgus has been a Member of the European Parliament.

Scheuring-Wielgus is an atheist.
