= Krzysztof Tołwiński =

Polish politician, born 1968

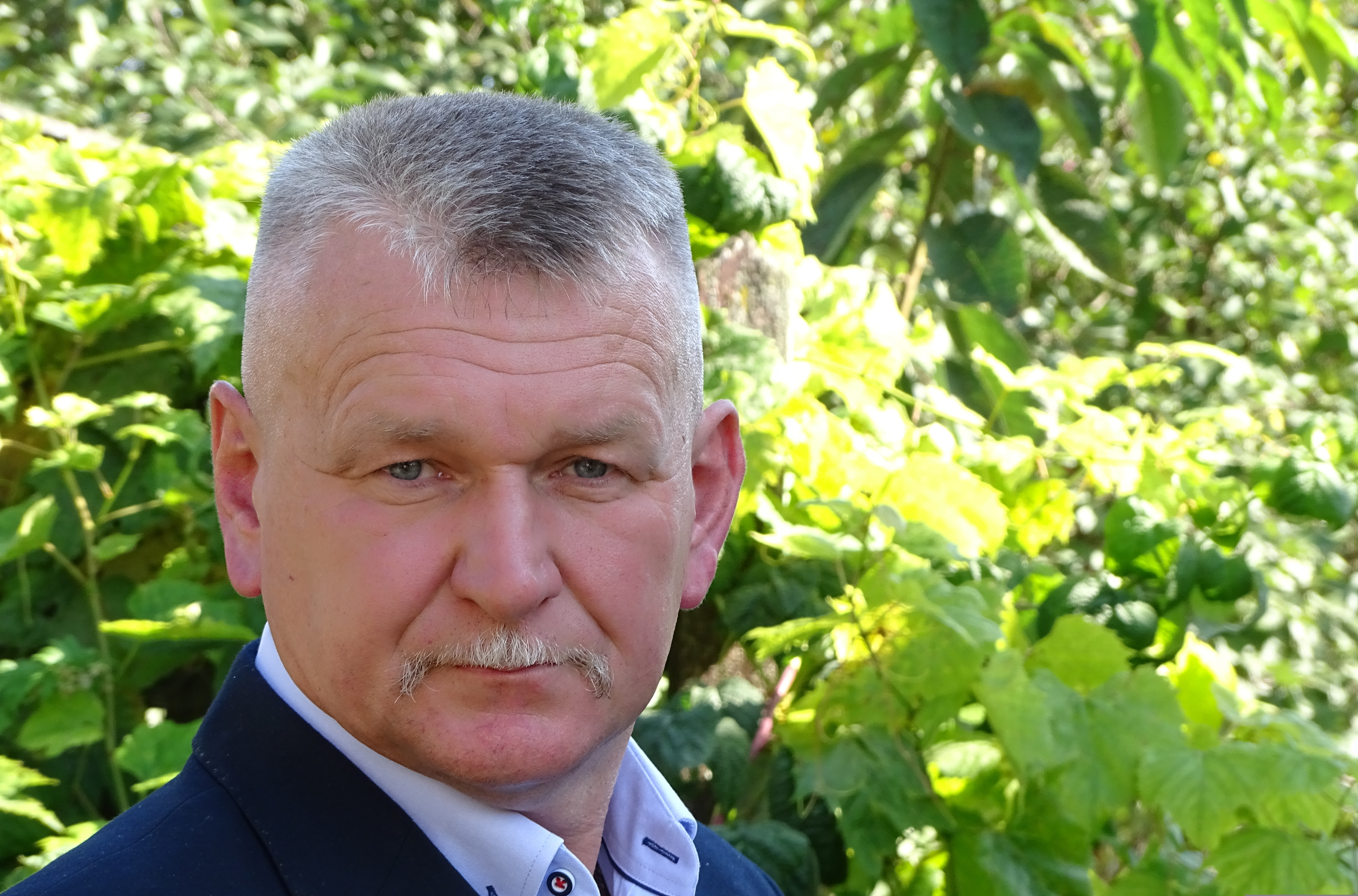
Krzysztof Tołwiński (2019)

Krzysztof Tołwiński (born 28 February 1968 in Siemiatycze) is a Polish agrarian politician, farmer, and former deputy minister of the treasury from September to November 2007. In 2010 he became a deputy in the Sejm from the Białystok constituency. He replaced Krzysztof Putra who died in the Smolensk air disaster. He ran for election in 2019 starting from the Confederation list but was not elected. He was a candidate in the 2019–20 Confederation presidential primary. In 2022, he became the leader of the Front party. In January 2025, Tołwinski was widely criticized for visiting, together with his party colleague Wacław Klukowski, Belarus and praising the presidential elections there as flawless and a role model for democracy.
