= Leszek Sykulski =

Leszek Sykulski (born 1981 in Częstochowa) is a Polish political scientist specializing in geopolitics.

== Biography ==
He graduated from Jagiellonian University in Kraków (MA in history), Silesian University in Katowice (PhD in political science) and the National Defence University in Warsaw (postgraduate studies). He also graduated from the General Tadeusz Kościuszko Military University of Land Forces reserve officers' course.

He was an assistant professor in the Department of National Security at the College of Business and Entrepreneurship in Ostrowiec Świętokrzyski. He was also a lecturer at the National Defence University of Warsaw and Polonia University in Częstochowa. In 2015 he was a visiting professor in Saint Jerome University in Douala, Cameroon.

He worked as an international security analyst in the Office of the President of Poland during th presidency of Lech Kaczyński.

Sykulski is one of the founders of the pro-Russian Polish Geopolitical Society. He was the president in the periods 2008–2009 and 2012-2014, he currently holds the position of honorary president. He was the editor in chief of the affiliated "Geopolitical Review" quarterly in the period 2009-2016 of the Geopolityka.net internet portal . He is also Editor of Polish "Ante Portas – Security Studies" and Bulgarian "Geopolitika".

Leszek Sykulski is a geopolitician and focuses his work on, amongst others, the representation of space in the information warfare and Russian and Polish geopolitical thought. He advocates for cooperation between Poland and Russia. He is also engaged in research about the geopolitics of Central Europe.

== Selected publications ==
- Polska myśl geopolityczna w latach 1989-2009 (Polish Geopolitical Thought 1989–2009), Chorzów 2015, ISBN 978-83-941420-0-1.
- Studia nad rosyjską geopolityką (Studies on Russian Geopolitics), Częstochowa 2014, ISBN 978-83-931924-5-8.
- Geopolitics – Grounded in the Past, Geared Toward the Future, Częstochowa 2013, ISBN 978-83-931924-4-1.
- Geopolityka. Słownik terminologiczny (Geopolitics. Dictionary), Warszawa 2009, ISBN 978-83-01-15968-9.
