= PolExit (political party) =

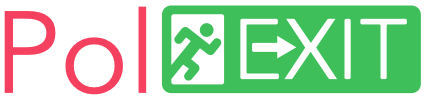
- Chairman: Stanisław Żółtek
- Founded: January 2019
- Split from: Congress of the New Right
- Headquarters: ul. Lotnicza 10, Kraków
- Ideology: Hard Euroscepticism; Traditionalist conservatism Right-libertarianism
- Political position: Far-right
- Sejm: 0 / 460
- Senate: 0 / 100
- European Parliament: 0 / 53
- Regional assemblies: 0 / 552
- Mayors: 0 / 2,476
- Powiat Councils: 0 / 6,170
- Gmina Councils: 0 / 39,416

Website
- polexit.org.pl

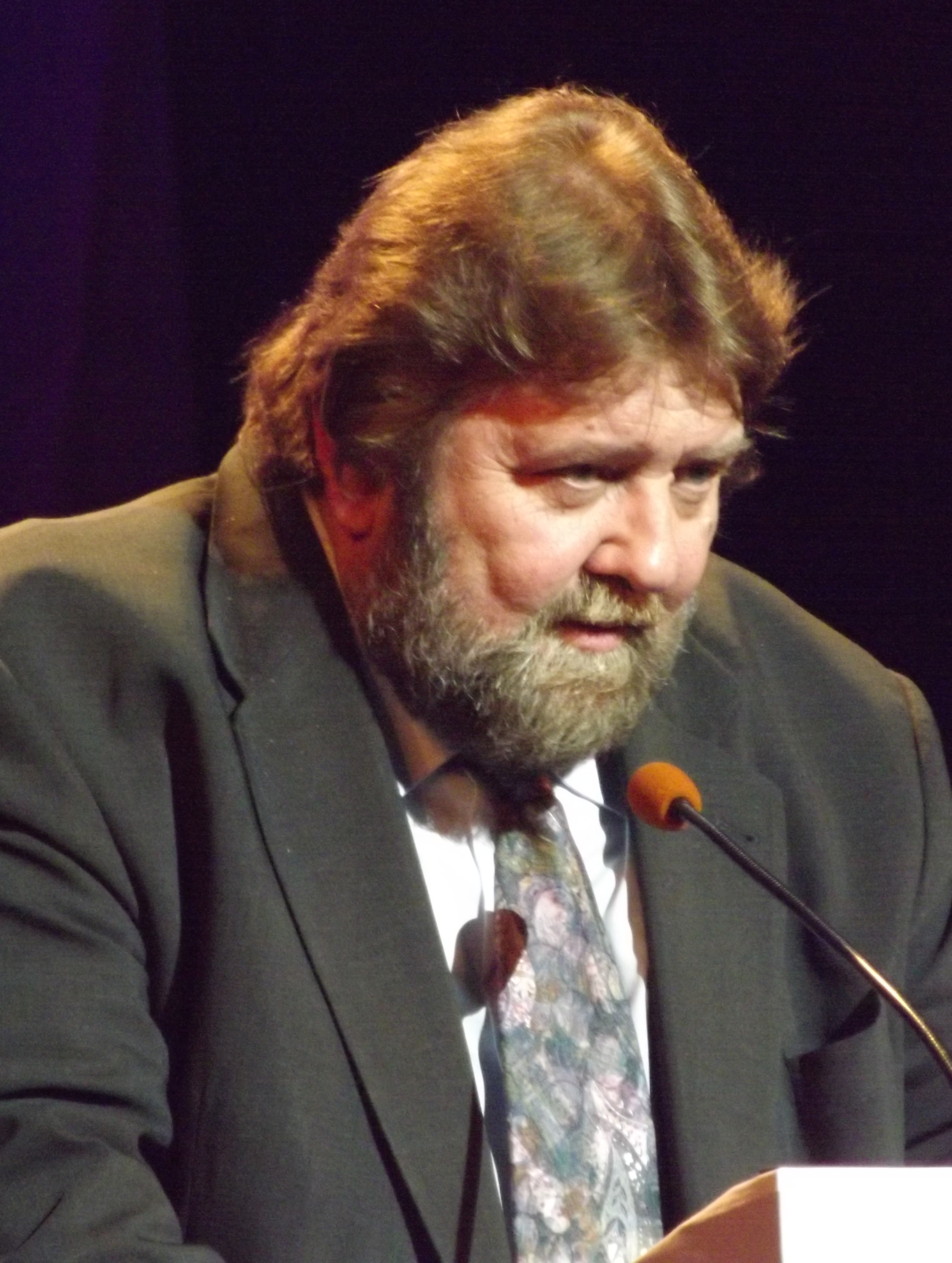
Party chairman Stanisław Żółtek

PolExit (also stylized PolEXIT) is a Polish far-right political party founded by members of Congress of the New Right (KNP), which continued to exist and work together with PolExit. Its creation was announced in January 2019 in European Parliament by then-chairman of KNP, MEP Stanisław Żółtek. It was applied for registration in December 2018 and formally registered on 14 March 2019. Stanisław Żółtek became its chairman, while its board included other KNP members such as Janusz Żurek, Tomasz Krzciuk and Antoni Sajdak. One of the co-leaders of the party was another KNP MEP, Michał Marusik.

== History ==
A coalition committee "PolEXIT – Koalicja" was created by PolExit and KNP to contest the 2019 European Parliament election, although it only registered lists in Subcarpathian and Lesser Poland and Świętokrzyskie constituencies and received 7900 votes (0.06%).

On 25 July 2019 PolExit was temporarily re-registered as Concord (Zgoda) by AGROunia leader Michał Kołodziejczak, although he did not formally join it and has later withdrawn from its creation. The party registered a committee in the 2019 Polish parliamentary election but did not field lists and its members ran as KNP members on Right Wing of the Republic list in Kraków II constituency with Stanisław Żółtek on the first position. On a convention in January 2020, Concord returned to its previous name PolExit.

KNP members also registered a party called Responsibility (Odpowiedzialność) the day after registering PolExit. Its first treasurer was Janusz Żurek and the board included Stanisław Żółtek. Its chairman was Leszek Samborski, replaced in 2020 by Łukasz Belter. Responsibility became independent from KNP and Concord in autumn of 2019 and dissolved in 2023.

The candidate of KNP and PolExit in the 2020 Polish presidential election was Stanisław Żółtek. He received 0.23% of votes, achieving seventh place. He did not supported either candidate in the second round. In the 2023 Polish parliamentary election both parties supported There is One Poland. PolExit did not run in the 2024 Polish local elections despite creating a committee.

In the 2024 European Parliament election the party started as a nationwide committee, registering lists in all 13 constituencies. The committee included PolExit and KNP members, independents, as well as one Federation for the Republic member (list leader in the Pomeranian constituency) and one member of There is One Poland. It received 0.25% of votes.

== Ideology ==
The party supports withdrawal of Poland from the European Union that became different from what the party believes to be its original goals (such as free trade and free movement of people). It believes the current goals of the EU are "reign over nations and authority of bureaucracy". It supports creating a new international alliance to replace the EU after withdrawal.

== Election results ==
=== Presidential ===
| Election year | Candidate | 1st round | | 2nd round | |
| Election year | Candidate | No. of overall votes | % of overall vote | No. of overall votes | % of overall vote |
|---|---|---|---|---|---|
| 2020 | Stanisław Żółtek | 45,419 | 0.23% (#7) | | |
| 2025 | Grzegorz Braun | 1,238,462 | 6.35 (#4) | | |

=== European Parliament ===
| Election | Votes | Leader | % | Seats | +/– | EP Group |
|---|---|---|---|---|---|---|
| 2019 | Stanisław Żółtek | 7,900 | 0.06 (#8) | 0 / 52 | New | – |
| 2019 | In a joint list with KNP, that didn't win any seat. | | | | | |
| 2024 | Stanisław Żółtek | 29,195 | 0.25 (#7) | 0 / 53 | 0 | – |
| 2024 | In a joint list with KNP and FdR, that didn't win any seat. | | | | | |
