= Michał Marusik =

Polish politician (1951–2020)

Michał Marusik MEP
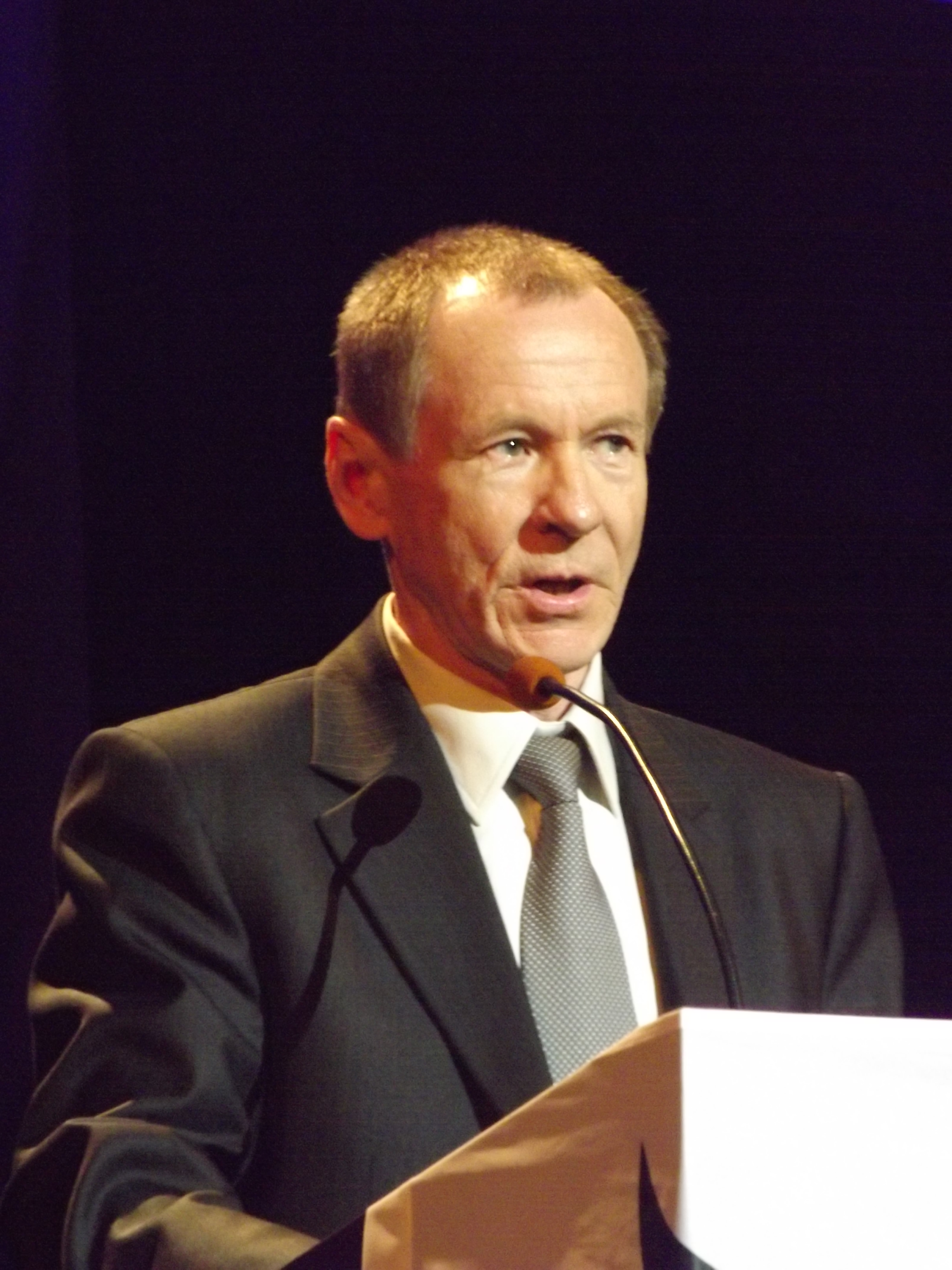

Leader of the Congress of the New Right
- In office 5 January 2015 – 28 January 2017
- Preceded by: Janusz Korwin-Mikke
- Succeeded by: Stanisław Żółtek

Member of the European Parliament for Warsaw
- In office 1 July 2014 – 1 July 2019

Personal details
- Born: 26 September 1951 Skrzynki, Poland
- Died: 18 December 2020 (aged 69)
- Party: Congress of the New Right

Michał Marusik (26 September 1951 — 18 December 2020) was a Polish politician who was leader of the Congress of the New Right (KNP) from 2015 to 2017. He was a Congress of the New Right Member of the European Parliament representing Warsaw from 2014-2019.

On 28 January 2017, Marusik resigned as KNP leader. On the same day Stanisław Żółtek was elected to replace him.

Marusik died on 18 December 2020.
