= Opinion polling for the 2020 Polish presidential election =

During the weeks leading up to the 2020 Polish presidential election, various organizations carry out opinion polling to gauge voters' intentions in Poland. Results of such polls are displayed in this article.

The date range for these opinion polls are from the previous presidential election, held on 24 May 2015, to election day.

== First round ==
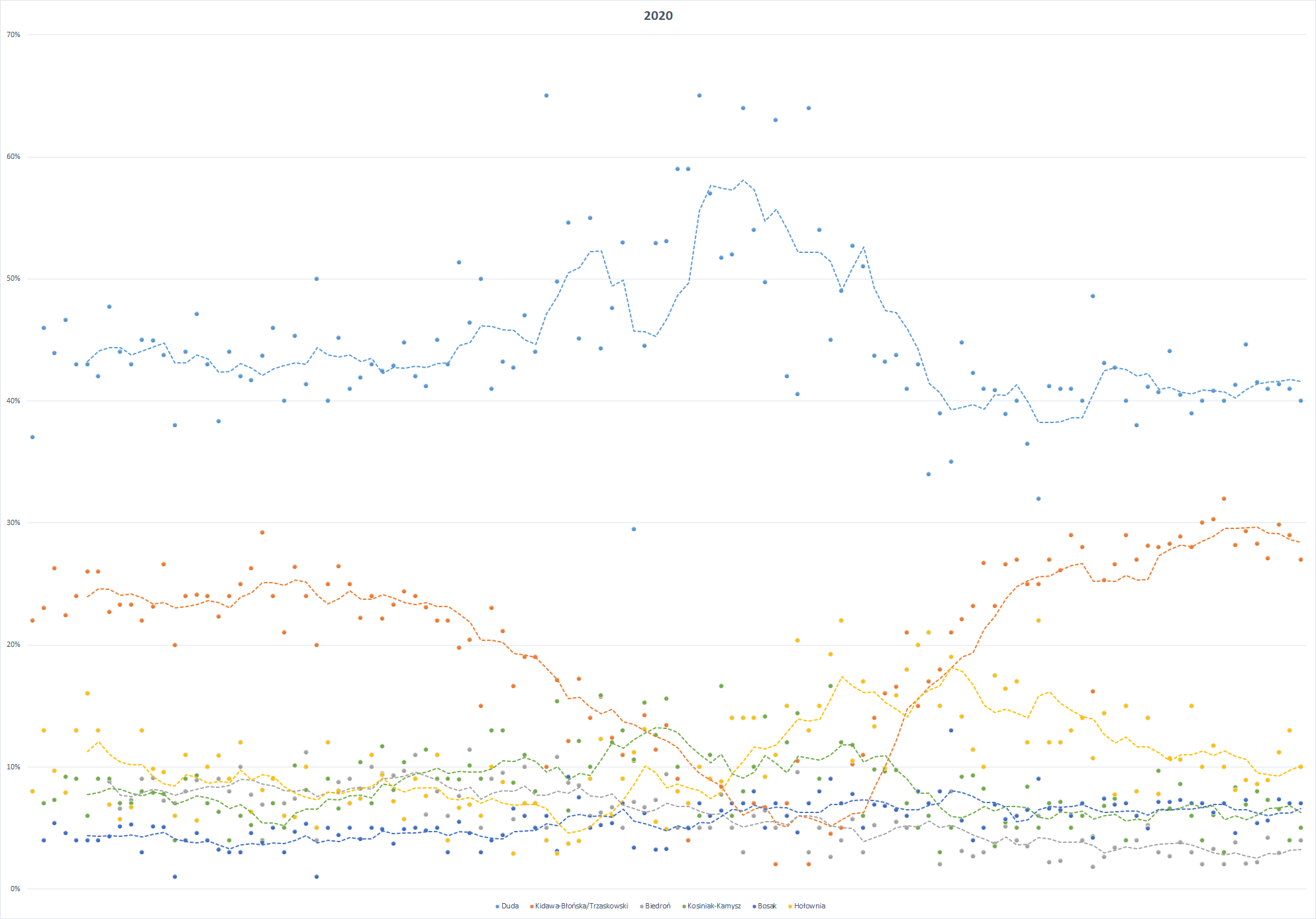
2020 Polish presidential election I round AVERAGE

Poll source	Date(s) administered	Don't know/ Abstain	Others						
Poll source	Date(s) administered	Don't know/ Abstain	Others	Duda PiS (Note: The President of Poland traditionally resigns from party membership after taking office. Although Duda is officially an independent, his campaign is endorsed and funded by Law and Justice.)	Trzaskowski PO	Biedroń LEFT	Kosiniak-Kamysz PSL	Bosak KWiN	Hołownia IN
LATE POLL: IPSOS LATE POLL	28 June 2020	-	1.6% (Note: Includes: 0.5% – Marek Jakubiak, 0.3% – Stanisław Żółtek, 0.3% – Paweł Tanajno, 0.3% – Waldemar Witkowski, 0.2% – Mirosław Piotrowski.)	42.5%	30.3%	2.5%	2.5%	7.1%	13.5%
EXIT POLL: IPSOS 21:00 UTC+2	28 June 2020	-	1.6% (Note: Includes: 0.5% – Marek Jakubiak, 0.3% – Stanisław Żółtek, 0.3% – Paweł Tanajno, 0.3% – Waldemar Witkowski, 0.2% – Mirosław Piotrowski.)	41.8%	30.4%	2.9%	2.6%	7.4%	13.3%
	28 June 2020	28 June 2020 (first round)							
IBSP	25–26 June 2020	-	1.14%	42.31%	31.03%	2.54%	1.69%	7.41%	13.88%
Indicator	23–26 June 2020	-	-	41.1%	30.2%	3.8%	5.4%	7.2%	12.3%
IBRiS	25 June 2020	-	1.0%	41.2%	30.7%	3.9%	4.1%	7.2%	12.0%
Estymator	24–25 June 2020	-	1.1%	42.7%	28.4%	3.6%	6.3%	7.6%	10.3%
Kantar	24–25 June 2020	8%	-	40%	27%	3%	2%	7%	13%
Pollster	24–25 June 2020	-	1.30%	41.27%	30.30%	3.35%	5.81%	7.23%	10.74%
PGB Opinium	23–25 June 2020	-	0.7%	40.5%	29.7%	3.8%	7.0%	7.3%	11.0%
CBOS	15–25 June 2020	14%	-	45%	20%	2%	4%	4%	11%
IBRiS	24 June 2020	6.6%	1.3% (Note: Includes: 0.7% – Marek Jakubiak, 0.3% – Stanisław Żółtek, 0.2% – Paweł Tanajno, 0.1% – Waldemar Witkowski, 0.0% – Mirosław Piotrowski.)	41.1%	26.4%	4.9%	5.4%	4.6%	9.7%
IPSOS	22–23 June 2020	4%	1% (Note: Includes: 1% – Waldemar Witkowski.)	40%	27%	4%	5%	7%	10%
Social Changes	19–23 June 2020	-	2% (Note: Includes: 1% – Paweł Tanajno, 1% – Stanisław Żółtek, 0% – Marek Jakubiak, 0% – Mirosław Piotrowski.)	41%	29%	4%	4%	7%	13%
Pollster	22 June 2020	-	0.76%	41.38%	29.86%	2.93%	6.55%	7.34%	11.18%
Maison & Partners (Note: Hołownia's campaign staff internal poll)	19–22 June 2020	5.5%	-	33.1%	28.2%	6.2%	3.4%	7.8%	15.8%
IBRiS	20 June 2020	4.7%	1.2% (Note: Includes: 0.5% – Stanisław Żółtek, 0.4% – Marek Jakubiak, 0.2% – Paweł Tanajno, 0.1% – Mirosław Piotrowski, 0.0% – Waldemar Witkowski.)	41.0%	27.1%	4.2%	7.3%	5.6%	8.9%
IBRiS	19–20 June 2020	1.2%	-	43.1%	27.4%	4.5%	7.5%	6.2%	10.1%
United Survey	19 June 2020	5.9%	0.2%	41.5%	28.3%	2.2%	8.0%	5.4%	8.6%
Estymator	18–19 June 2020	-	0.9%	44.6%	29.3%	2.1%	6.9%	7.3%	8.9%
IBRiS	18 June 2020	4.5%	1.3% (Note: Includes: 0.6% – Paweł Tanajno, 0.4% – Waldemar Witkowski, 0.2% – Stanisław Żółtek, 0.1% – Marek Jakubiak, 0.1% – Mirosław Piotrowski.)	41.3%	28.2%	3.8%	8.3%	4.6%	8.1%
Kantar	17–18 June 2020	6%	-	40%	32%	2%	3%	7%	10%
Pollster	16–17 June 2020	-	1.58%	40.82%	30.28%	3.28%	6.06%	6.24%	11.74%
IPSOS	16–17 June 2020	6%	-	40%	30%	2%	4%	7%	10%
Social Changes	12–16 June 2020	-	2% (Note: Includes: 1% – Marek Jakubiak, 1% – Mirosław Piotrowski.)	39%	28%	3%	6%	7%	15%
Maison & Partners	12–15 June 2020	5.0%	-	37.0%	28.4%	4.0%	4.4%	6.3%	14.8%
PGB Opinium	12–15 June 2020	-	-	40.5%	28.9%	3.8%	8.6%	7.3%	10.6%
Estymator	12–13 June 2020	-	0.5%	44.1%	28.3%	2.7%	6.6%	7.1%	10.7%
IBRiS	12–13 June 2020	3.6%	-	40.7%	28.0%	3.0%	9.7%	7.1%	7.8%
Pollster	9–10 June 2020	-	1.51%	41.17%	28.14%	5.22%	4.99%	4.97%	14.00%
Kantar	5–10 June 2020	11%	-	38%	27%	4%	6%	6%	8%
Social Changes	5–9 June 2020	-	1% (Note: Includes: 1% – Marek Jakubiak.)	40%	29%	4%	4%	7%	15%
N/A (Note: PiS / Duda's campaign staff internal poll)	N/A June 2020	12%	5%	36%	31%	2%	8%	N/A (Note: 5% others)	6%
IBRiS	5–6 June 2020	5.2%	0.1% (Note: Includes: 0.1% – Marek Jakubiak.)	42.7%	26.6%	3.4%	7.4%	6.9%	7.7%
Estymator	3–4 June 2020	-	0.4%	43.1%	25.3%	2.6%	6.8%	7.4%	14.4%
CBOS	22 May–4 June 2020	13.4%	0.8%	48.6%	16.2%	1.8%	4.3%	4.2%	10.7%
	3 June 2020	Election is announced to be held on June 28. The campaign starts							
Pollster	2–3 June 2020	-	1%	40%	28%	4%	6%	7%	14%
Social Changes	29 May–2 June 2020	-	1% (Note: Includes: 1% – Marek Jakubiak, 0% – Stanisław Żółtek, 0% – Paweł Tanajno, 0% – Mirosław Piotrowski.)	41%	29%	5%	5%	6%	13%
IBRiS	29–30 May 2020	5.0%	-	41.0%	26.1%	2.3%	7.1%	6.5%	12.0%
United Survey	29 May 2020	4.0%	-	41.2%	27.0%	2.2%	7.0%	6.6%	12.0%
SWPS	28–29 May 2020	-	1%	32%	25%	6%	5%	9%	22%
PGB Opinium	26–29 May 2020	7.6%	0.4% (Note: Includes: 0.1% – Marek Jakubiak, 0.0% – Stanisław Żółtek, 0.3% – Paweł Tanajno, 0% – Mirosław Piotrowski.)	36.5%	25.0%	3.5%	8.4%	6.5%	12.0%
Pollster	26–27 May 2020	-	1.74%	38.94%	26.60%	5.14%	5.46%	5.71%	16.41%
Social Changes	22–25 May 2020	-	1% (Note: Includes: 1% – Marek Jakubiak, 0% – Paweł Tanajno, 0% – Mirosław Piotrowski, 0% – Stanisław Żółtek.)	40%	27%	4%	5%	6%	17%
Maison & Partners	N/A May 2020	-	-	40.9%	23.2%	3.7%	3.5%	6.9%	17.5%
IBRiS	22–23 May 2020	6.1%	-	41.0%	26.7%	3.0%	8.2%	5.0%	10.0%
IBRiS	22–23 May 2020	7.1%	-	42.3%	23.2%	2.7%	9.3%	4.0%	11.4%
Estymator	21–22 May 2020	-	1.1%	44.8%	22.1%	3.1%	9.2%	5.6%	14.1%
PBS	19–20 May 2020	-	-	35%	21%	8%	5%	13%	19%
Kantar	18–19 May 2020	12%	4% (Note: Includes: 2% – Marek Jakubiak, 2% – Stanisław Żółtek, <1% – Paweł Tanajno, <1% – Mirosław Piotrowski.)	39%	18%	2%	3%	8%	15%
Maison & Partners	15–18 May 2020 (Note: The poll measures voting intention in case election is held in traditional form in July.)	10%	-	34%	17%	6%	6%	7%	21%
Maison & Partners	15–18 May 2020 (Note: The poll measures voting intention in case election is held next Sunday (24 May).)	6%	-	43%	15%	5%	5%	8%	20%
Social Changes	11–18 May 2020	-	2% (Note: Includes: 1% – Marek Jakubiak, 1% – Paweł Tanajno, 0% – Mirosław Piotrowski, 0% – Stanisław Żółtek.)	41%	21%	5%	7%	6%	18%
Pollster	15–17 May 2020	-	2.13% (Note: Includes: 0.82% – Paweł Tanajno, 0.80% – Marek Jakubiak, 0.43% – Mirosław Piotrowski, 0.08% – Stanisław Żółtek.)	43.76%	16.54%	5.51%	9.73%	6.45%	15.88%
IBRiS	16 May 2020	7.7%	-	43.2%	16.0%	6.8%	9.6%	6.8%	9.9%
United Survey	15 May 2020	7.1%	-	43.7%	14.0%	5.2%	9.8%	6.9%	13.3%
Kantar Public	15 May 2020	6%	1%	51%	11%	3%	6%	5%	17%
	15 May 2020	Rafał Trzaskowski is declared as a new candidate of the Civic Coalition							
Estymator	14–15 May 2020	-	1.3%	52.7%	10.2%	5.7%	11.8%	7.8%	10.5%

Poll source	Date(s) administered	Don't know/ Abstain	Others						
Poll source	Date(s) administered	Don't know/ Abstain	Others	Duda PiS	Kidawa-Błońska PO	Biedroń LEFT	Kosiniak-Kamysz PSL	Bosak KWiN	Hołownia IN
Social Changes	12–14 May 2020	-	1% (Note: Includes: 1% – Paweł Tanajno, 0% – Marek Jakubiak, 0% – Mirosław Piotrowski, 0% – Stanisław Żółtek.)	49%	5%	4%	12%	7%	22%
	10 May 2020	Election de iure takes place despite no voting is held. The campaign ends							
IBRiS	8–9 May 2020 (Note: The poll measures voting intention in case voting in person at polling stations is conducted.)	3.1%	0.0% (Note: Includes: 0.0% – Stanisław Żółtek, 0.0% – Paweł Tanajno, 0.0% – Mirosław Piotrowski, 0.0% – Marek Jakubiak.)	45.0%	4.5%	2.6%	16.6%	9.0%	19.2%
	6 May 2020	Postal election is announced to be cancelled in May							
Social Changes	6–7 May 2020	-	4% (Note: Includes: 1% – Marek Jakubiak, 1% – Paweł Tanajno, 1% – Stanisław Żółtek, 1% – Mirosław Piotrowski.)	54%	5%	5%	9%	8%	15%
Social Changes	6–7 May 2020 (Note: The poll measures voting intention in case all-postal voting is conducted.)	-	4%	64%	2%	3%	7%	7%	13%
Pollster	30 April-4 May 2020	-	-	40.57%	10.49%	9.56%	14.39%	4.65%	20.34%
IPSOS	27–29 April 2020	11%	-	42%	7%	6%	12%	6%	15%
IPSOS	27–29 April 2020	5%	-	63%	2%	5%	7%	7%	11%
IBRiS	27 April 2020	8.9%	-	49.7%	6.7%	6.4%	14.1%	5.0%	9.2%
Social Changes	24–27 April 2020	-	1% (Note: Includes: 1% – Marek Jakubiak.)	54%	7%	6%	10%	8%	14%
Social Changes	24–27 April 2020	-	1%	64%	3%	3%	8%	7%	14%
CBOS	23–27 April 2020	10%	1%	52%	5%	5%	6%	7%	14%
Estymator	23–24 April 2020	-	0.4%	51.7%	8.4%	7.7%	16.6%	6.4%	8.8%
Social Changes	17–20 April 2020	-	1%	57%	11%	5%	11%	6%	9%
Social Changes	17–20 April 2020	-	2% (Note: Includes: 2% – Marek Jakubiak.)	65%	5%	5%	6%	7%	10%
Kantar	16–17 April 2020	11%	3%	59%	4%	5%	7%	5%	7%
Social Changes	10–13 April 2020	-	1%	59%	9%	5%	10%	8%	8%
Estymator	8–9 April 2020	-	0.3%	53.1%	13.4%	9.4%	15.6%	3.3%	4.9%
IBRiS	7 April 2020	7.1%	-	52.9%	11.4%	7.3%	12.6%	3.2%	5.5%
Pollster	6–7 April 2020	-	-	44.53%	14.23%	6.70%	15.25%	6.21%	13.08%
Maison & Partners	3–7 April 2020	27.9%	-	29.5%	10.5%	7.1%	10.6%	3.4%	11.2%
Social Changes	3–6 April 2020	-	2%	53%	11%	5%	13%	7%	9%
IBRiS	3–4 April 2020	9.9%	-	47.6%	12.4%	6.7%	12.0%	5.4%	6.0%
IBSP	31 March-2 April 2020	-	0.29%	44.29%	15.77%	6.24%	15.87%	5.24%	12.30%
	29 March 2020	Małgorzata Kidawa-Błońska calls to boycott May postal election							
Social Changes	27–30 March 2020	-	1%	55%	14%	6%	10%	5%	9%
IBRiS	27–28 March 2020 (Note: The poll measures voting intention in case the election is held during the polling period.)	5.6%	-	45.1%	17.2%	8.5%	12.1%	7.5%	3.9%
IBRiS	27–28 March 2020 (Note: The poll measures voting intention in case the election is held on 10 May 2020.)	5.3%	-	54.6%	12.1%	8.7%	6.4%	9.2%	3.7%
Estymator	25–26 March 2020	-	0.9%	49.8%	17.1%	10.8%	15.4%	3.1%	2.9%
Kantar	23–24 March 2020 (Note: The poll measures voting intention in case the election is held during the coronavirus pandemic.)	6%	-	65%	10%	5%	4%	6%	4%
Kantar	23–24 March 2020 (Note: The poll measures voting intention in case the election is held after the end of the coronavirus pandemic.)	10%	-	44%	19%	7%	8%	5%	7%
Social Changes	20–23 March 2020	-	-	47%	19%	10%	11%	6%	7%
United Survey	20 March 2020	16.7%	-	42.7%	16.6%	5.7%	8.7%	6.6%	2.9%
Pollster	17–18 March 2020	-	-	43.19%	21.13%	9.54%	12.96%	4.44%	8.74%
Social Changes	13–17 March 2020	-	-	41%	23%	9%	13%	4%	10%
CBOS	5–15 March 2020	10%	-	50%	15%	5%	9%	3%	6%
Estymator	12–13 March 2020	-	0.2%	46.4%	20.4%	11.4%	10.1%	4.6%	6.9%
IBSP	10–13 March 2020	-	0.15%	51.36%	19.79%	7.59%	8.98%	5.51%	6.62%
Kantar	6–11 March 2020	13%	-	43%	22%	6%	9%	3%	4%
Social Changes	6–10 March 2020	-	-	45%	22%	8%	9%	5%	11%
	4 March 2020	First case of COVID-19 confirmed in Poland							
IBRiS	2 March 2020	5.9%	-	41.2%	23.1%	6.1%	11.4%	4.8%	7.6%
Social Changes	28 February-2 March 2020	-	-	42%	24%	11%	9%	5%	9%
Estymator	27–28 February 2020	-	0.1%	44.8%	24.4%	9.7%	10.4%	4.9%	5.7%
Indicator	26–28 February 2020	4.3%	1.2%	42.9%	23.3%	9.3%	8.1%	3.7%	7.2%
Pollster	24–26 February 2020	-	-	42.44%	22.14%	9.45%	11.71%	4.92%	9.34%
Social Changes	21–24 February 2020	-	-	43%	24%	10%	7%	5%	11%
United Survey	22 February 2020	5.8%	-	41.9%	22.2%	8.2%	10.4%	4.1%	7.4%
IPSOS	20–22 February 2020	6%	-	41%	25%	9%	7%	5%	7%
IBSP	18–20 February 2020	-	0.58%	45.16%	26.42%	8.78%	6.56%	4.44%	8.06%
Social Changes	14–18 February 2020	-	-	40%	25%	9%	9%	5%	12%
CBOS	6–16 February 2020	12%	3%	50%	20%	4%	5%	1%	5%
Dobra Opinia	10–14 February 2020	-	-	41.34%	24.02%	11.21%	8.11%	5.31%	10.01%
Estymator	12–13 February 2020	-	0.2%	45.3%	26.4%	7.4%	10.1%	4.7%	5.9%
Kantar	7–12 February 2020	17%	1%	40%	21%	7%	5%	3%	6%
Social Changes	7–11 February 2020	-	-	46%	24%	9%	7%	5%	9%
IBRiS	7–8 February 2020	4.3%	-	43.7%	29.2%	6.9%	4.0%	3.8%	8.1%
IBRiS	N/A	8.2%	-	41.7%	26.3%	7.7%	5.2%	4.6%	6.3%
	5 February 2020	Election is officially announced to be held on May 10. The campaign starts							
Social Changes	1–4 February 2020	-	2% (Note: Includes: 2% – Piotr Liroy-Marzec.)	42%	25%	10%	6%	3%	12%
Kantar	29-30 January 2020	7%	1%	44%	24%	8%	4%	3%	9%
Maison & Partners	24–28 January 2020	10.0%	-	38.3%	22.3%	9.0%	6.3%	3.2%	10.9%
Social Changes	24–27 January 2020	-	2% (Note: Includes: 2% – Piotr Liroy-Marzec.)	43%	24%	10%	7%	4%	10%
Estymator	23–24 January 2020	-	0.4%	47.1%	24.1%	8.9%	9.3%	4.6%	5.6%
	18 January 2020	Krzysztof Bosak is declared as a candidate of the Confederation							
Social Changes	17–21 January 2020	-	-	44%	24%	8%	9%	4%	11%
Kantar	9-15 January 2020	22%	2%	38%	20%	7%	4%	1%	6%
IBSP	14–16 January 2020	-	-	43.73%	26.61%	7.26%	7.77%	5.07%	9.56%
Pollster	14–16 January 2020	-	-	44.96%	23.11%	9.09%	7.86%	5.12%	9.86%
Social Changes	10–14 January 2020	-	-	45%	22%	9%	8%	3%	13%
United Survey	10–11 January 2020	7.4%	-	43.0%	23.3%	7.3%	7.0%	5.3%	6.7%
IBRiS	10-11 January 2020	8.2%	-	44%	23.3%	6.6%	7.0%	5.1%	5.7%
Estymator	9–10 January		-	47.7%	22.7%	8.8%	9%	4.3%	6.9%
	5 January 2020	Robert Biedroń is declared as a candidate of the Left							
Social Changes	3–7 January 2020	-	6% (Note: Includes: 6% – Adrian Zandberg.)	42%	26%	-	9%	4%	13%
Social Changes	27–31 December 2019	-	5% (Note: Includes: 5% – Adrian Zandberg.)	43%	26%	-	6%	4%	16%
Social Changes	20–24 December 2019	-	7% (Note: Includes: 7% – Adrian Zandberg.)	43%	24%	-	9%	4%	13%
Estymator	19–20 December 2019	-	8.3% (Note: Includes: 8.3% – Adrian Zandberg.)	46.6%	22.4%	-	9.2%	4.6%	7.9%
IBSP	17–20 December 2019	-	7.4% (Note: Includes: 7.2% – Adrian Zandberg.)	43.9%	26.3%	-	7.3%	5.4%	9.7%
Social Changes	13–17 December 2019	-	7% (Note: Includes: 7% – Adrian Zandberg.)	46%	23%	-	7%	4%	13%
Social Changes	28 November-3 December 2019	14%	11% (Note: Includes: 7% – Adrian Zandberg, 4% – Grzegorz Braun.)	37%	22%	-	8%	-	8%

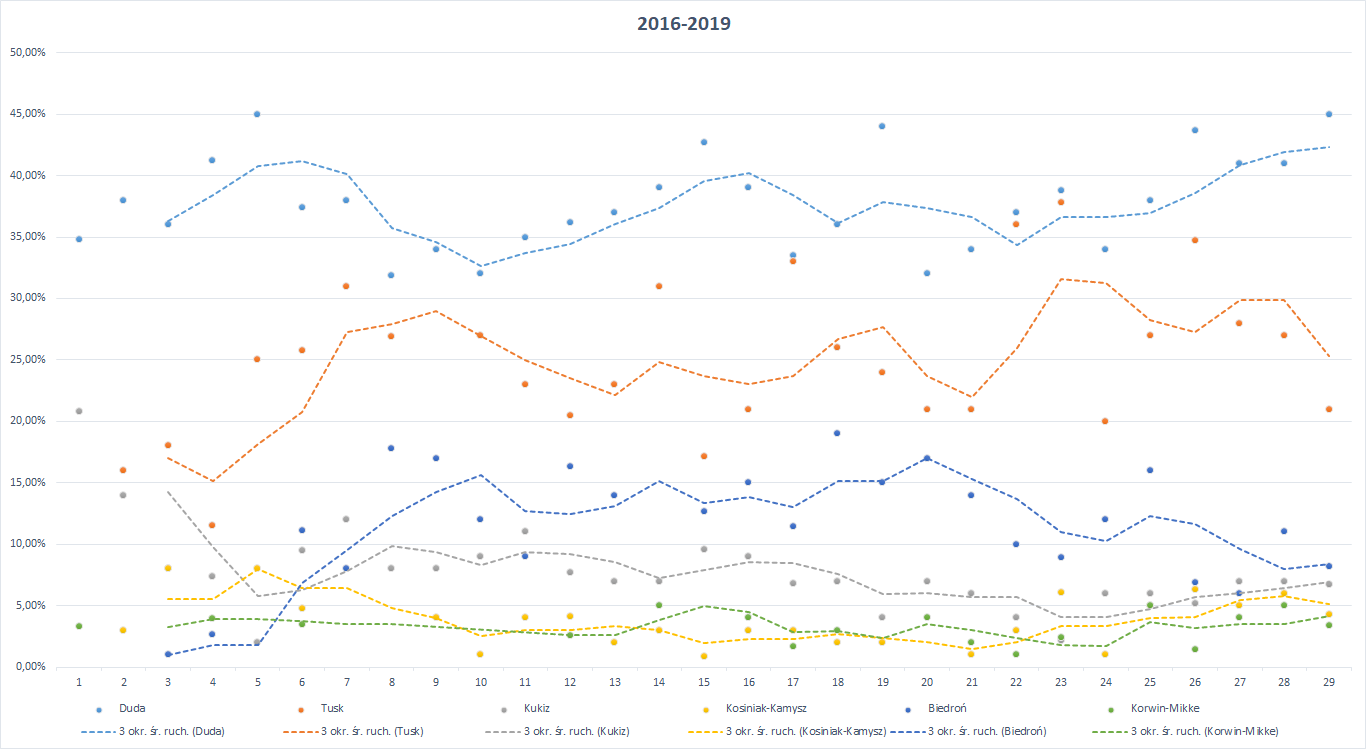
Pre-2020 polls average

=== Pre-2020 opinion polls ===
Poll source	Date(s) administered	Don't know/ Abstain	Others														
Poll source	Date(s) administered	Don't know/ Abstain	Others	Duda PiS	Other PiS	Tusk PO	Other PO	Czarzasty SLD	Kukiz K'15	Petru.N	Lubnauer.N	Kosiniak-Kamysz PSL	Biedroń Wiosna	Zandberg Razem	Korwin-Mikke KORWiN	Rzepliński IN	Nowacka IN
Social Changes	19–24 July 2019	-	1.9% (Note: Includes: 1.9% – Grzegorz Braun.)	45%	-	21%	6.9% (Note: Includes: 5.2% – Rafał Trzaskowski, 1.7% – Bartosz Arłukowicz.)	-	6.7%	-	-	4.3%	8.2%	-	3.4%	-	2.7%
Kantar Public	16–19 May 2019	2%	-	41%	-	27%	-	-	7%	-	-	6%	11%	1%	5%	-	-
Kantar Public	8–10 May 2019	8%	-	41%	-	28%	-	-	7%	-	-	5%	6%	1%	4%	-	-
IBSP	7–9 May 2019	-	0.4%	43.7%	-	34.7%	-	1.3%	5.2%	-	-	6.3%	6.9%	-	1.4%	-	-
Pollster	4–6 April 2019	-	-	38%	-	27%	-	1%	6%	-	0%	5%	16%	2%	5%	-	-
Ariadna	22–26 February 2019	24%	-	34%	-	20%	-	-	6%	-	-	1%	12%	1%	-	-	2%
IBSP	31 January-6 February 2019	3.0%	-	38.8%	-	37.8%	-	0.7%	2.2%	-	-	6.1%	8.9%	-	2.4%	-	-
IBRiS	13 November 2018	9%	-	37%	-	36%	-	-	4%	-	-	3%	10%	-	1%	-	-
Ariadna	17–21 August 2018	14%		34%	7% (Note: Includes: 5% – Mateusz Morawiecki, 1% – Jarosław Kaczyński, 1% – Zbigniew Ziobro.)	21%	-	-	6%	-	-	1%	14%	1%	2%	-	-
Pollster	11–12 July 2018	-	19%	32%	-	21%	-	-	7%	-	-	-	17%	-	4%	-	-
Millward Brown	25–26 April 2018	6%	4%	44%	-	24%	-	-	4%	-	-	2%	15%	1%	-	-	-
Pollster	5 April 2018	-	4% (Note: Includes: 4% – Monika Jaruzelska.)	36%	-	26%	-	-	7%	-	3%	2%	19%	-	3%	-	-
IBRiS	4 April 2018	9.3%	-	33.5%	-	33.0%	-	-	6.8%	-	-	3.0%	11.4%	1.3%	1.7%	-	-
Pollster	3–5 January 2018	-	-	39%	-	21%	-	1%	9%	-	2%	3%	15%	3%	4%	-	3%
Ariadna	29 September-2 October 2017	14.3%	-	42.7%	-	17.1%	-	0.4%	9.6%	-	-	0.9%	12.7%	1.0%	-	-	1.3%
Pollster	16–17 August 2017	-	-	39%	6% (Note: Includes: 6% – Beata Szydło)	31%	1% (Note: Includes: 1% – Grzegorz Schetyna)	3%	7%	2%	-	3%	-	3%	5%	-	-
Ariadna	28–31 July 2017	14%	-	37%	-	23%	-	0%	7%	-	-	2%	14%	2%	-	-	1%
IBRiS	26–27 July 2017	9.9%	1.2% (Note: Includes: 1.2% – Marian Kowalski.)	36.2%	-	20.5%	-	-	7.7%	1.5%	-	4.1%	16.3%	-	2.6%	-	-
Ariadna	23–26 June 2017	14%	-	35%	-	23%	-	2%	11%	-	-	4%	9%	1%	-	-	1%
Ariadna	9–12 June 2017	14%	-	32%	-	27%	-	1%	9%	-	-	1%	12%	1%	-	-	3%
Ariadna	9–12 June 2017	21%	-	34%	-	-	8%	1%	8%	-	-	4%	17%	2%	-	-	5%
Ariadna	12–16 May 2017	15.4%	-	31.9%	-	26.9%	-	-	8%	-	-	-	17.8%	-	-	-	-
Kantar Public	26–27 April 2017	10%	1%	38%	-	31%	-	-	12%	-	-	-	8%	-	-	-	-
Dobra Opinia	30 March-3 April 2017	-	-	37.4%	-	25.8%	-	-	9.5%	7.9%	-	4.8%	11.1%	-	3.5%	-	-
Pollster	7–8 March 2017	-	8%	45%	-	25%	4% (Note: Includes: 4% – Bronisław Komorowski)	5%	2%	-	-	8%	-	3%	-	-	
Pollster	2–3 January 2017	-	17.18%	41.23%	2.19% (Note: Includes: 1.60% – Beata Szydło, 0.59% – Jarosław Kaczyński)	11.55%	4.37% (Note: Includes: 3.96% – Bronisław Komorowski, 0.24% – Grzegorz Schetyna, 0.17% – Ewa Kopacz)	-	7.36%	7.89%	-	-	2.62%	0.44%	3.93%	1.27%	-
IPSOS	19–21 December 2016	16%	1%	36%	1%	18%	1% (Note: Includes: 1% – Grzegorz Schetyna)	5%	8%	-	-	8%	1%	-	-	-	
Pollster	5–8 February 2016	-	9%	38%	-	16% (Note: Includes: 3% – Grzegorz Schetyna)		-	14%	17%	-	3%	-	-	-	-	-
Presidential election	10 May 2015	-	7.3%	34.8%	-	-	33.8% (Note: Bronisław Komorowski)	-	20.8%	-	-	-	-	-	3.3%	-	-

== Second round ==
=== Duda v. Trzaskowski ===
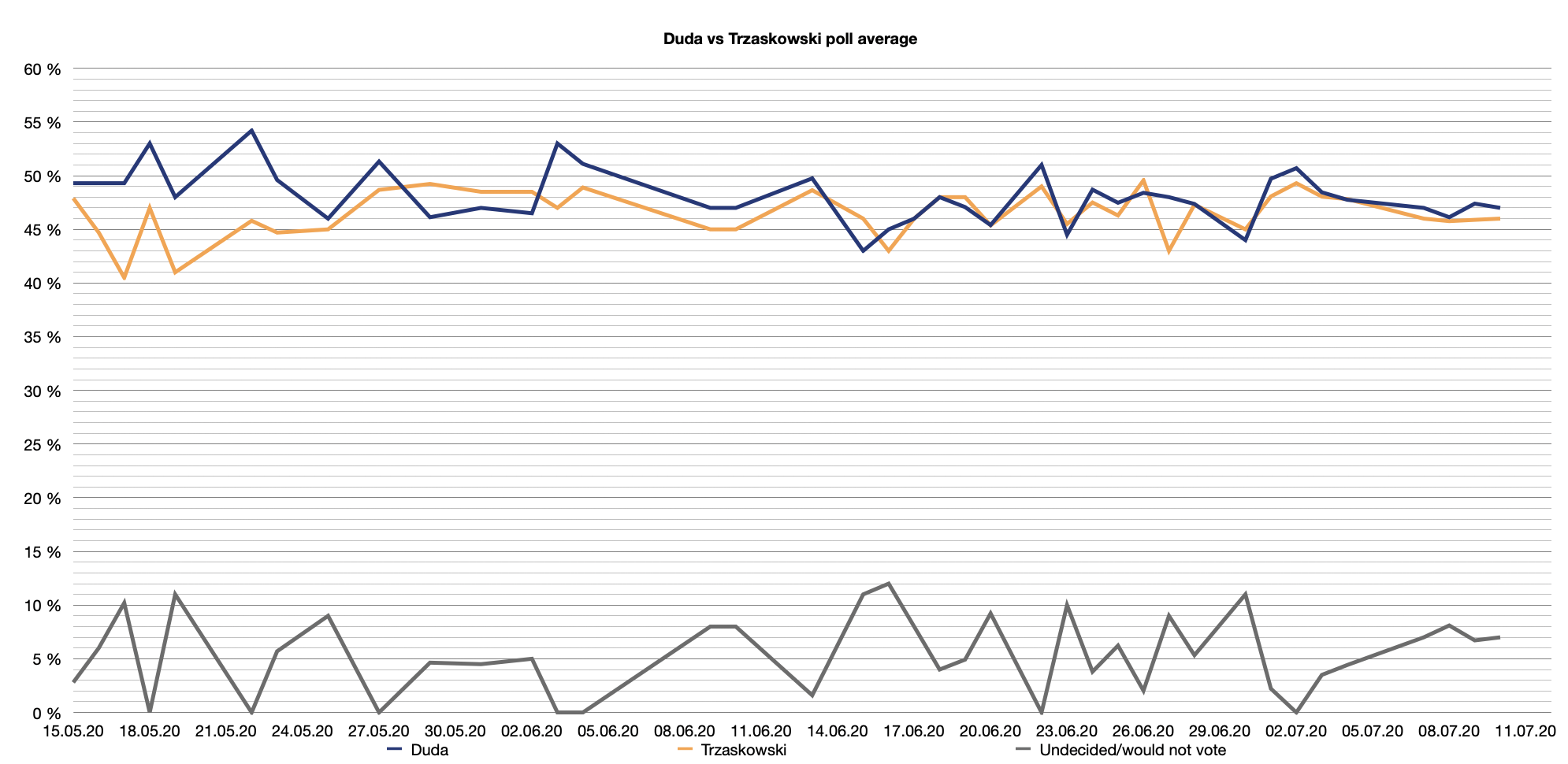

Poll source	Date(s) administered			Undecided/would not vote
Poll source	Date(s) administered	Duda PiS	Trzaskowski PO	Undecided/would not vote
LATE POLL: IPSOS LATE POLL	12–13 July 2020	51.0%	49.0%	–
LATE POLL: IPSOS LATE POLL	12 July 2020	50.8%	49.2%	–
EXIT POLL: IPSOS 21:00 UTC+2	12 July 2020	50.4%	49.6%	–
	12 July 2020	12 July 2020 (second round)		
Social Changes	8–10 July 2020	47%	46%	7%
IBRiS	9 July 2020	45.7%	47.4%	6.9%
CBOS	30 June–9 July 2020	44.4%	44.6%	11.0%
Kantar	8–9 July 2020	45.9%	46.4%	7.7%
Pollster	8–9 July 2020	50.72%	49.28%	-
Indicator	8–9 July 2020	45.9%	44.7%	9.4%
CBOS	29 June – 9 July 2020	50.0%	38.0%	12%
IBRiS	8 July 2020	44.4%	45.3%	10.3%
PGB Opinium	7–9 July 2020	49.16%	50.84%	-
IPSOS	7–8 July 2020	50%	47%	3%
Kantar	3–8 July 2020	44%	45%	11%
Social Changes	3–7 July 2020	47%	46%	7%
IBRiS	4 July 2020	48.7%	47.8%	3.5%
United Surveys	4 July 2020	46.8%	45.9%	7.4%
IBRiS	4 July 2020	45.9%	47.2%	6.9%
PGB Opinium	2–4 July 2020	49.62%	50.38%	-
Estymator	2–3 July 2020	50.9%	49.1%	-
Kantar	2–3 July 2020	46%	47%	7%
IBRiS	1 July 2020	49.0%	46.4%	4.6%
Indicator	30 June–2 July 2020	50.7%	49.3%	-
IPSOS	30 June–1 July 2020	48%	49%	3%
Pollster	30 June–1 July 2020	51.14%	48.86%	-
Kantar	30 June 2020	44%	45%	11%
IBRiS	28 June 2020	45.8%	48.1%	6.1%
Indicator	28 June 2020	50.9%	49.1%	-
Kantar	28 June 2020	45.4%	44.7%	9.9%
	28 June 2020	28 June 2020 (first round)		
Social Changes	26–27 June 2020	48%	43%	9%
IBRiS	26 June 2020	45.8%	48.1%	6.1%
IBSP	25–26 June 2020 (Note: The poll has been updated with exit poll data.)	48.51%	51.49%	-
Indicator	23–26 June 2020	50.9%	49.1%	-
Estymator	24–25 June 2020	50.6%	49.4%	-
Pollster	24–25 June 2020	44.83%	46.48%	8.69%
Kantar	24–25 June 2020	47%	45%	8%
IBRiS	24 June 2020	48.7%	47.5%	3.8%
IPSOS	22–23 June 2020	43%	47%	9%
Social Changes	19–23 June 2020	46%	44%	10%
Pollster	22 June 2020	51%	49%	-
IBRiS	20 June 2020	45.6%	45.5%	8.9%
IBRiS	19–20 June 2020	45.2%	46.0%	8.8%
United Survey	19 June 2020	45.8%	46.9%	7.4%
Estymator	18–19 June 2020	50.9%	49.1%	-
Kantar	17–18 June 2020	48%	48%	4%
IPSOS	16–17 June 2020	46%	46%	8%
Social Changes	12–16 June 2020	45%	43%	12%
Maison & Partners	12–15 June 2020	43%	46%	11%
Estymator	12–13 June 2020	50.7%	49.3%	-
IBRiS	12–13 June 2020	48.8%	48.0%	3.2%
Pollster	9–10 June 2020	53%	47%	-
Kantar	5–10 June 2020	41%	43%	16%
Social Changes	5–9 June 2020	47%	45%	8%
Estymator	3–4 June 2020	51.1%	48.9%	-
Pollster	2–3 June 2020	53%	47%	-
N/A (Note: PiS / Duda's campaign staff internal poll)	1–2 June 2020	47%	53%	-
Social Changes	29 May–2 June 2020	46%	42%	12%
United Survey	29 May 2020	44.5%	44.3%	11.2%
IBRiS	29 May 2020	49.0%	46.4%	4.6%
SWPS	28–29 May 2020	43%	57%	-
Pollster (Note: Determined people, without undecided ones)	26–27 May 2020	51.32%	48.68%	-
Social Changes	22–25 May 2020	46%	45%	9%
Maison & Partners	N/A May 2020	49%	42%	9%
IBRiS	22–23 May 2020	49.6%	44.7%	5.7%
Estymator	21–22 May 2020	54.2%	45.8%	-
N/A (Note: PiS / Duda's campaign staff internal poll)	N/A May 2020	45%	55%	-
Kantar	18–19 May 2020	48%	41%	11%
Social Changes	11–18 May 2020	48%	41%	11%
Pollster	15–17 May 2020	53%	47%	-
United Survey	15 May 2020	49.3%	40.5%	10.2%
IBSP	31 January–6 February 2019	47.9%	49.3%	2.8%

== Pre-first round polls ==
=== Duda v. Hołownia ===
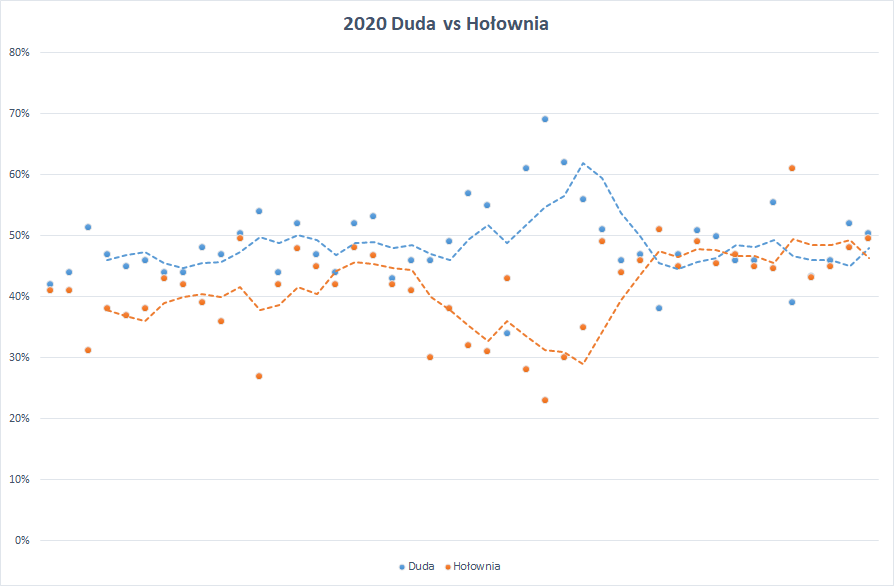
Duda vs Hołownia polls average

Poll source	Date(s) administered			Undecided/would not vote
Poll source	Date(s) administered	Duda PiS	Hołownia IN	Undecided/would not vote
Indicator	23–26 June 2020	50.6%	49.4%	-
IPSOS	22–23 June 2020	44%	49%	7%
Social Changes	19–23 June 2020	45%	44%	11%
Pollster	22 June 2020	48%	52%	-
IPSOS	16–17 June 2020	44%	48%	8%
Social Changes	12–16 June 2020	44%	44%	12%
Maison & Partners	12–15 June 2020	42%	50%	8%
Estymator	12–13 June 2020	49.8%	50.2%	-
Pollster	9–10 June 2020	53%	47%	-
Social Changes	5–9 June 2020	45%	47%	8%
Kantar	5–10 June 2020	41%	43%	16%
Estymator	3–4 June 2020	50.4%	49.6%	-
Pollster	2–3 June 2020	52%	48%	-
Social Changes	29 May–2 June 2020	46%	45%	9%
United Survey	29 May 2020	43.4%	43.1%	13.5%
SWPS	28–29 May 2020	39%	61%	-
Pollster	26–27 May 2020	55.43%	44.57%	-
Social Changes	22–25 May 2020	46%	45%	9%
Maison & Partners	N/A May 2020	46%	47%	7%
IBRiS	22–23 May 2020	49.8%	45.4%	4.8%
Estymator	21–22 May 2020	50.9%	49.1%	-
Kantar	18–19 May 2020	47%	45%	8%
Maison & Partners	15–18 May 2020	38%	51%	11%
Maison & Partners	15–18 May 2020	47%	46%	7%
Social Changes	11–18 May 2020	46%	44%	10%
Pollster	15–17 May 2020	51%	49%	-
Social Changes	1–4 May 2020	56%	35%	9%
Social Changes	17–20 April 2020	62%	30%	8%
Kantar	16–17 April 2020	69%	23%	8%
Social Changes	10–13 April 2020	61%	28%	11%
Maison & Partners	3–7 April 2020	34%	43%	23%
Social Changes	3–6 April 2020	55%	31%	14%
Social Changes	27–30 March 2020	57%	32%	11%
Social Changes	20–23 March 2020	49%	38%	13%
Kantar	6–11 March 2020	46%	30%	24%
Social Changes	6–10 March 2020	46%	41%	13%
Social Changes	28 February-2 March 2020	43%	42%	15%
Indicator	26–28 February 2020	53.2%	46.8%	-
Pollster	24–26 February 2020	51.99%	48.01%	-
Social Changes	21–24 February 2020	44%	42%	14%
IPSOS	20–22 February 2020	47%	45%	8%
IBSP	18–20 February 2020	52.08%	47.92%	-
Social Changes	14–18 February 2020	44%	42%	14%
CBOS	6–16 February 2020	54%	27%	19%
Dobra Opinia	10–14 February 2020	50.4%	49.6%	-
Kantar	7–12 February 2020	47%	36%	17%
Social Changes	7–11 February 2020	48%	39%	13%
Social Changes	1–4 February 2020	44%	42%	14%
Maison & Partners	24–28 January 2020	44%	43%	13%
Social Changes	24–27 January 2020	46%	38%	16%
Social Changes	17–21 January 2020	45%	37%	18%
Social Changes	10–14 January 2020	47%	38%	15%
United Survey	10–11 January 2020	51.4%	31.2%	17.4%
Social Changes	3–7 January 2020	44%	41%	15%
Social Changes	27–31 December 2019	42%	41%	17%

=== Duda v. Kosiniak-Kamysz ===
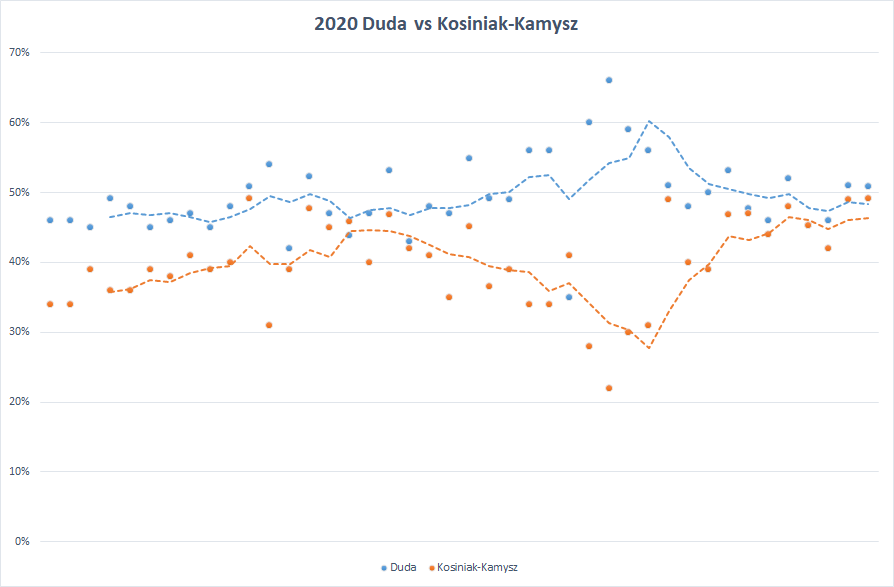
Duda vs Kosiniak-Kamysz polls average

Poll source	Date(s) administered			Undecided/would not vote
Poll source	Date(s) administered	Duda PiS	Kosiniak-Kamysz PSL	Undecided/would not vote
Indicator	23–26 June 2020	51.9%	48.1%	-
Social Changes	19–23 June 2020	44%	41%	15%
Pollster	22 June 2020	50%	50%	-
IPSOS	16–17 June 2020	45%	45%	11%
Social Changes	12–16 June 2020	44%	42%	14%
Estymator	12–13 June 2020	50.1%	49.9%	-
Pollster	9–10 June 2020	51%	49%	-
Social Changes	5–9 June 2020	45%	44%	11%
Estymator	3–4 June 2020	50.9%	49.1%	-
Pollster	2–3 June 2020	51%	49%	-
Social Changes	29 May–2 June 2020	46%	42%	12%
United Survey	29 May 2020	45.3%	45.3%	9.4%
Pollster	26–27 May 2020	51.99%	48.01%	-
Social Changes	22–25 May 2020	46%	44%	10%
IBRiS	22–23 May 2020	47.7%	47.0%	5.3%
Estymator	21–22 May 2020	53.2%	46.8%	-
Kantar	18–19 May 2020	50%	39%	11%
Social Changes	11–18 May 2020	48%	40%	12%
Pollster	15–17 May 2020	51%	49%	-
Social Changes	1–4 May 2020	56%	31%	13%
Social Changes	17–20 April 2020	59%	30%	11%
Kantar	16–17 April 2020	66%	22%	12%
Social Changes	10–13 April 2020	60%	28%	12%
Maison & Partners	3–7 April 2020	35%	41%	24%
Social Changes	3–6 April 2020	56%	34%	10%
Social Changes	27–30 March 2020	56%	34%	10%
Social Changes	20–23 March 2020	49%	39%	12%
United Survey	20 March 2020	49.2%	36.6%	14.2%
IBSP	10–13 March 2020	54.91%	45.09%	-
Kantar	6–11 March 2020	47%	35%	18%
Social Changes	6–10 March 2020	48%	41%	11%
Social Changes	28 February-2 March 2020	43%	42%	15%
Indicator	26–28 February 2020	53.1%	46.9%	-
Social Changes	21–24 February 2020	47%	40%	13%
United Survey	22 February 2020	43.9%	45.9%	10.3%
IPSOS	20–22 February 2020	47%	45%	8%
IBSP	18–20 February 2020	52.23%	47.77%	-
Social Changes	14–18 February 2020	42%	39%	19%
CBOS	6–16 February 2020	54%	31%	15%
Dobra Opinia	10–14 February 2020	50.8%	49.2%	-
Social Changes	7–11 February 2020	48%	40%	12%
Social Changes	1–4 February 2020	45%	39%	16%
Maison & Partners	24–28 January 2020	47%	41%	12%
Social Changes	24–27 January 2020	46%	38%	16%
Social Changes	17–21 January 2020	45%	39%	16%
Social Changes	10–14 January 2020	48%	36%	16%
United Survey	10–11 January 2020	49.1%	36.0%	14.8%
Social Changes	3–7 January 2020	45%	39%	16%
Social Changes	27–31 December 2019	46%	34%	20%
Social Changes	28 November-3 December 2019	46%	34%	20%

=== Duda v. Biedroń ===
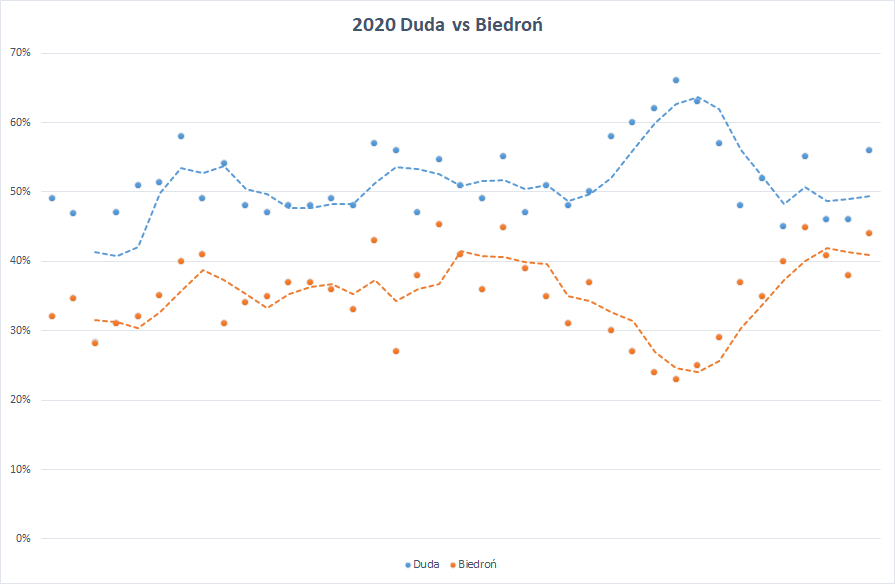
Duda vs Biedroń polls average

Poll source	Date(s) administered			Undecided/would not vote
Poll source	Date(s) administered	Duda PiS	Biedroń LEFT	Undecided/would not vote
Indicator	23–26 June 2020	55.7%	44.3%	-
Social Changes	19–23 June 2020	44%	40%	16%
Pollster	22 June 2020	56%	44%	-
Social Changes	12–16 June 2020	45%	39%	16%
Pollster	9–10 June 2020	53%	47%	-
Social Changes	5–9 June 2020	47%	41%	12%
Pollster	2–3 June 2020	56%	44%	-
Social Changes	29 May–2 June 2020	46%	38%	16%
United Survey	29 May 2020	46.1%	40.9%	13.0%
Pollster	26–27 May 2020	55.07%	44.93%	-
Social Changes	22–25 May 2020	45%	40%	15%
Kantar	18–19 May 2020	52%	35%	13%
Social Changes	11–18 May 2020	48%	37%	15%
Social Changes	1–4 May 2020	57%	29%	14%
Social Changes	17–20 April 2020	63%	25%	12%
Kantar	16–17 April 2020	66%	23%	11%
Social Changes	10–13 April 2020	62%	24%	14%
Social Changes	3–6 April 2020	60%	27%	13%
Social Changes	27–30 March 2020	58%	30%	12%
Social Changes	20–23 March 2020	50%	37%	13%
Kantar	6–11 March 2020	48%	31%	21%
Social Changes	6–10 March 2020	51%	35%	14%
Social Changes	28 February-2 March 2020	47%	39%	14%
Indicator	26–28 February 2020	55.1%	44.9%	-
Social Changes	21–24 February 2020	49%	36%	15%
IPSOS	20–22 February 2020	51%	41%	8%
IBSP	18–20 February 2020	54.64%	45.36%	-
Social Changes	14–18 February 2020	47%	38%	15%
CBOS	6–16 February 2020	56%	27%	17%
Dobra Opinia	10–14 February 2020	57%	43%	-
Kantar	7–12 February 2020	48%	33%	19%
Social Changes	7–11 February 2020	49%	36%	15%
Social Changes	1–4 February 2020	48%	37%	15%
Social Changes	24–27 January 2020	48%	37%	15%
Social Changes	17–21 January 2020	47%	35%	18%
Social Changes	10–14 January 2020	48%	34%	18%
United Survey	10–11 January 2020	54.1%	31.0%	14.8%
IBRiS	13 November 2018	49%	41%	10%
Millward Brown	25–26 April 2018	58%	40%	2%
IBRiS	14–15 October 2017	51.4%	35.1%	13.5%
Ariadna	28–31 July 2017	51%	32%	17%
Ariadna	12–16 May 2017	47%	31%	22%
Ariadna	12–16 May 2017	28.3%	28.1%	43.6% (Note: 13.8% undecided, 29.8% would not vote)
IPSOS	17–19 March 2017	46.9%	34.6%	18.4%
Millward Brown	20–22 May 2016	49%	32%	19%

=== Duda v. Bosak ===
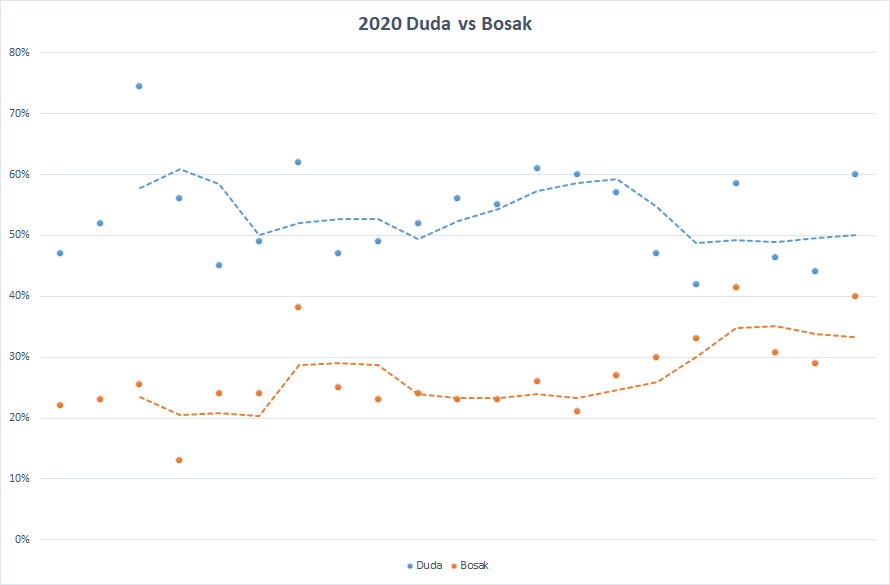
Duda vs Bosak polls average

Poll source	Date(s) administered			Undecided/would not vote
Poll source	Date(s) administered	Duda PiS	Bosak KWiN	Undecided/would not vote
Indicator	23–26 June 2020	52.0%	48.0%	-
Social Changes	19–23 June 2020	41%	34%	25%
Pollster	22 June 2020	58%	42%	-
Social Changes	12–16 June 2020	40%	33%	27%
Estymator	12–13 June 2020	60.1%	39.9%	-
Pollster	9–10 June 2020	61%	39%	-
Social Changes	5–9 June 2020	42%	32%	26%
Pollster	2–3 June 2020	60%	40%	-
Social Changes	29 May–2 June 2020	44%	29%	27%
United Survey	29 May 2020	46.3%	30.7%	23.0%
Pollster	26–27 May 2020	58.53%	41.47%	-
Social Changes	22–25 May 2020	42%	33%	25%
Social Changes	11–18 May 2020	47%	30%	23%
Social Changes	1–4 May 2020	57%	27%	16%
Social Changes	17–20 April 2020	60%	21%	19%
Social Changes	10–13 April 2020	61%	26%	13%
Social Changes	3–6 April 2020	55%	23%	22%
Social Changes	27–30 March 2020	56%	23%	21%
Social Changes	20–23 March 2020	52%	24%	24%
Social Changes	6–10 March 2020	49%	23%	28%
Social Changes	28 February-2 March 2020	47%	25%	28%
Indicator	26–28 February 2020	61.9%	38.1%	-
Social Changes	21–24 February 2020	49%	24%	27%
Social Changes	14–18 February 2020	45%	24%	31%
CBOS	6–16 February 2020	56%	13%	31%
Dobra Opinia	10–14 February 2020	74.5%	25.5%	-
Social Changes	7–11 February 2020	52%	23%	25%
Social Changes	1–4 February 2020	47%	22%	31%

=== Duda v. Kidawa-Błońska ===
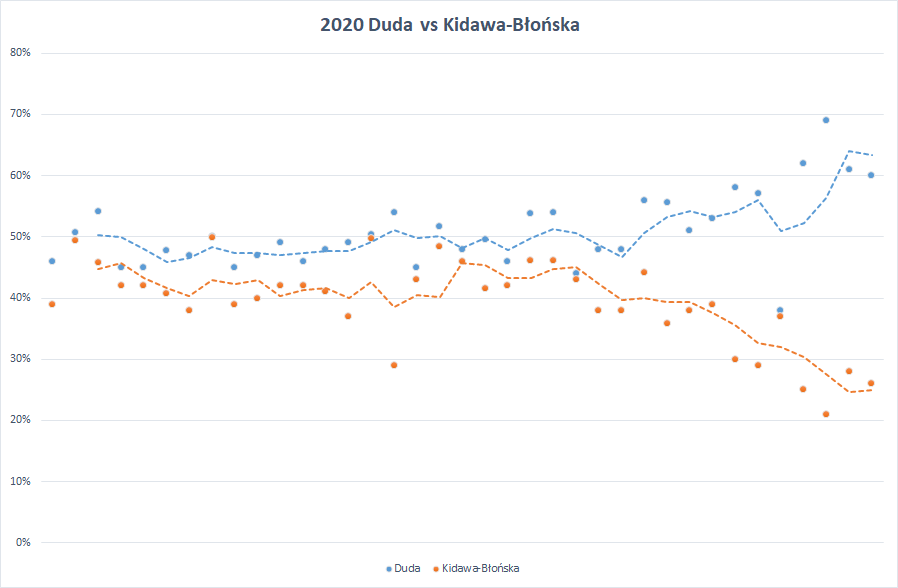
Duda vs Kidawa-Błońska polls average

Poll source	Date(s) administered			Undecided/would not vote
Poll source	Date(s) administered	Duda PiS	Kidawa-Błońska PO	Undecided/would not vote
Social Changes	1–4 May 2020	60%	26%	14%
Social Changes	17–20 April 2020	61%	28%	11%
Kantar	16–17 April 2020	69%	21%	10%
Social Changes	10–13 April 2020	62%	25%	13%
Maison & Partners	3–7 April 2020	38%	37%	25%
Social Changes	3–6 April 2020	57%	29%	14%
Social Changes	27–30 March 2020	58%	30%	12%
Kantar	23–24 March 2020	53%	39%	8%
Social Changes	20–23 March 2020	51%	38%	11%
United Survey	20 March 2020	55.6%	35.9%	8.5%
IBSP	10–13 March 2020	55.88%	44.12%	-
Kantar	6–11 March 2020	48%	38%	14%
Social Changes	6–10 March 2020	48%	38%	14%
Social Changes	28 February-2 March 2020	44%	43%	13%
Indicator	26–28 February 2020	53.9%	46.1%	-
Pollster	24–26 February 2020	53.83%	46.17%	-
Social Changes	21–24 February 2020	46%	42%	12%
United Survey	22 February 2020	49.6%	41.6%	8.8%
IPSOS	20–22 February 2020	48%	46%	6%
IBSP	18–20 February 2020	51.62%	48.38%	-
Social Changes	14–18 February 2020	45%	43%	12%
CBOS	6–16 February 2020	54%	29%	17%
Dobra Opinia	10–14 February 2020	50.3%	49.7%	-
Kantar	7–12 February 2020	49%	37%	14%
Social Changes	7–11 February 2020	48%	41%	11%
Social Changes	1–4 February 2020	46%	42%	12%
Maison & Partners	24-28 January 2020	49%	42%	9%
Social Changes	24–27 January 2020	47%	40%	13%
Social Changes	17–21 January 2020	45%	39%	16%
IBSP	14–16 January 2020	50.09%	49.91%	-
Social Changes	10–14 January 2020	47%	38%	15%
United Survey	10–11 January 2020	47.8%	40.8%	11.4%
Social Changes	3–7 January 2020	45%	42%	13%
Social Changes	27–31 December 2019	45%	42%	13%
Pollster	20–22 December 2019	54.14%	45.86%	-
IBSP	17–20 December 2019	50.67%	49.33%	-
Social Changes	28 November-3 December 2019	46%	39%	15%

=== Duda v. Tusk ===
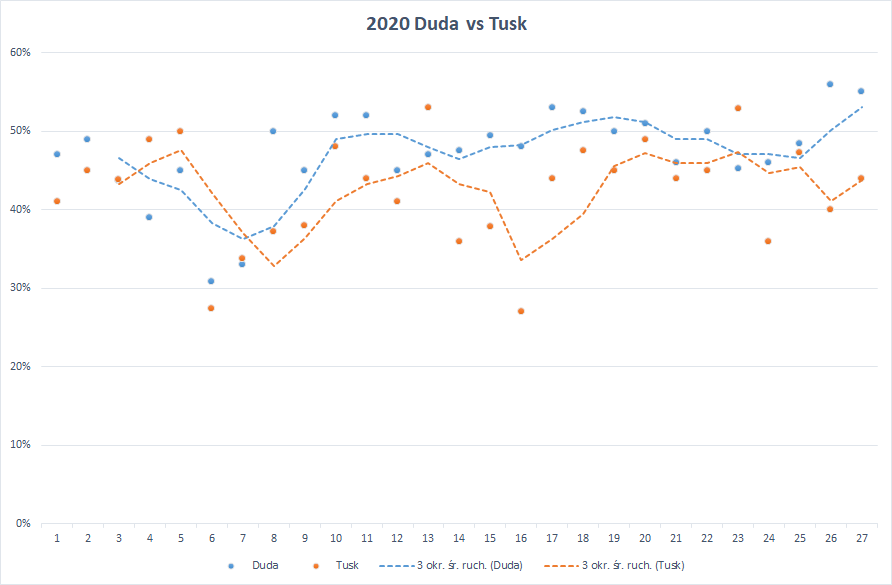
Duda vs Tusk polls average

Poll source	Date(s) administered			Undecided/would not vote
Poll source	Date(s) administered	Duda PiS	Tusk PO	Undecided/would not vote
Kantar Public	16–19 May 2019	55%	44%	1%
Kantar Public	8–10 May 2019	56%	40%	4%
IBSP	7–9 May 2019	48.4%	47.3%	4.3%
Ariadna	22–26 February 2019	46%	36%	18%
IBSP	31 January-6 February 2019	45.3%	52.9%	1.8%
Millward Brown	19–20 November 2018	50%	45%	5%
IBRiS	13 November 2018	46%	44%	10%
Pollster	9–10 August 2018	51%	49%	-
IBRiS	26–27 July 2018	50%	45%	5%
Pollster	13–14 June 2018	52.5%	47.5%	-
Millward Brown	25–26 April 2018	53%	44%	3%
Kantar Public	20–21 November 2017	48%	27%	25%
IBRiS	14–15 October 2017	49.4%	37.8%	12.8%
Ariadna	29 September-2 October 2017	47.5%	36.0%	16.5%
Pollster	20–21 September 2017	47%	53%	-
Ariadna	28–31 July 2017	45%	41%	14%
Millward Brown	11–12 July 2017	52%	44%	4%
Pollster	30 June-4 July 2017	52%	48%	-
Ariadna	23–26 June 2017	45%	38%	17%
IPSOS	19–21 June 2017	49.9%	37.2%	13%
Ariadna	12–16 May 2017	33%	33.8%	33.2%
Ariadna	12–16 May 2017	30.8%	27.4%	41.8% (Note: 17.3% undecided, 24.5% would not vote)
Millward Brown	24–25 April 2017	45%	50%	5%
Pollster	20–21 April 2017	39%	49%	12%
IPSOS	17–19 March 2017	43.7%	43.9%	12.4%
Millward Brown	5 October 2016	49%	45%	6%
Millward Brown	20–22 May 2016	47%	41%	12%

=== Duda v. Kukiz ===
Poll source	Date(s) administered			Undecided/would not vote
Poll source	Date(s) administered	Duda PiS	Kukiz K'15	Undecided/would not vote
Ariadna	12–16 May 2017	26.4%	16.3%	57.3% (Note: 16.7% undecided, 40.6% would not vote)
IPSOS	17–19 March 2017	44.9%	26.7%	28.4%
Millward Brown	20–22 May 2016	44%	26%	30%

=== Duda v. Petru ===
Poll source	Date(s) administered			Undecided/would not vote
Poll source	Date(s) administered	Duda PiS	Petru.N	Undecided/would not vote
Millward Brown	20–22 May 2016	47%	41%	12%

=== Duda v. Schetyna ===
Poll source	Date(s) administered			Undecided/would not vote
Poll source	Date(s) administered	Duda PiS	Schetyna PO	Undecided/would not vote
Millward Brown	20–22 May 2016	48%	33%	19%

=== Duda v. Sikorski ===
Poll source	Date(s) administered			Undecided/would not vote
Poll source	Date(s) administered	Duda PiS	Sikorski PO	Undecided/would not vote
Social Changes	11–18 May 2020	50%	36%	14%

=== Duda v. Nowacka ===
Poll source	Date(s) administered			Undecided/would not vote
Poll source	Date(s) administered	Duda PiS	Nowacka TR	Undecided/would not vote
Millward Brown	20–22 May 2016	50%	30%	20%

=== Kaczyński v. Tusk ===
Poll source	Date(s) administered			Undecided/would not vote
Poll source	Date(s) administered	Kaczyński PiS	Tusk PO	Undecided/would not vote
Pollster	9–10 August 2018	35%	65%	-
IBRiS	26–27 July 2018	41%	50%	9%
