= Tomasz Sommer =

Polish journalist

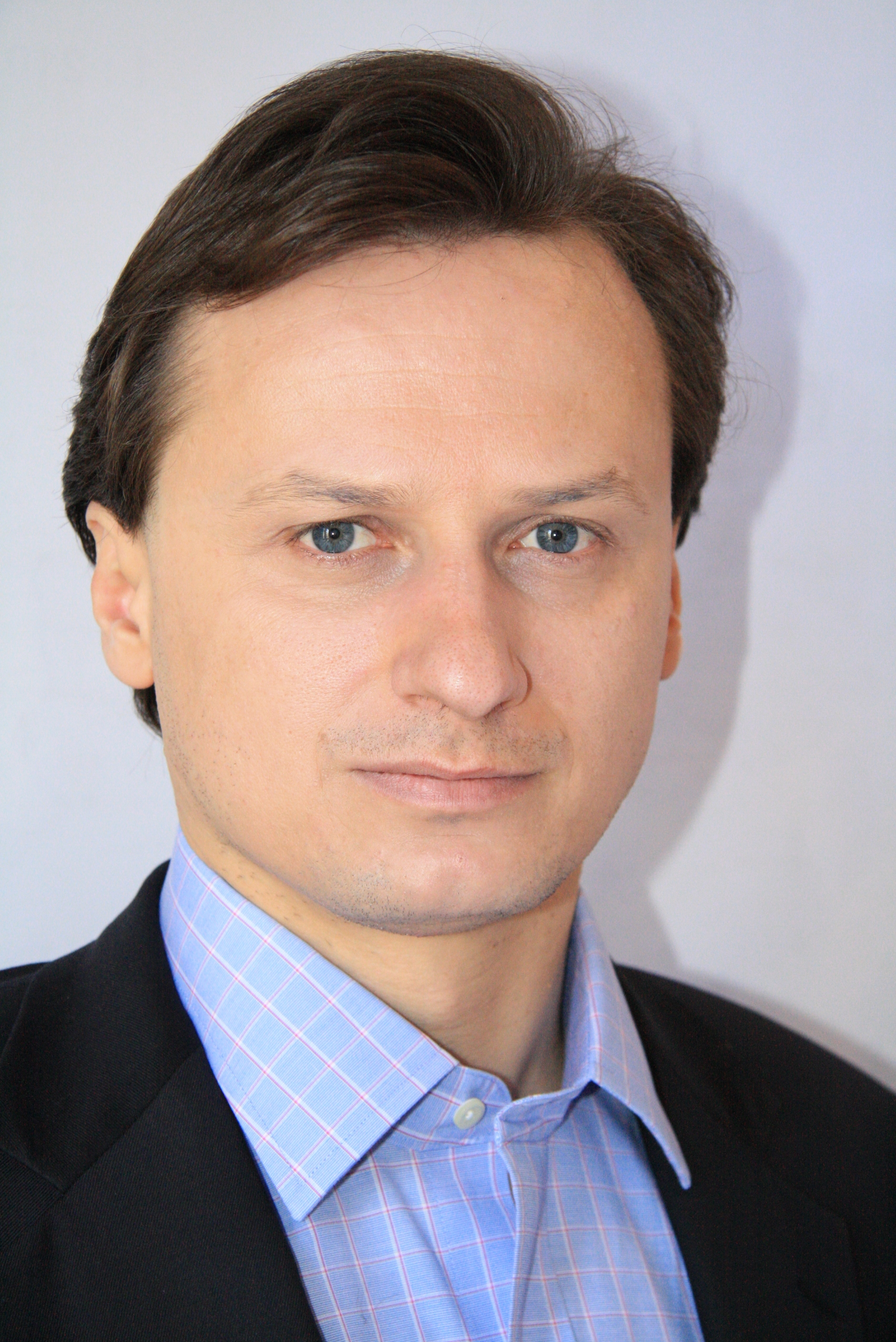
Portrait of Sommer, 2011

Tomasz Krzysztof Sommer (born 1972 in Puławy, Poland) is a Polish writer, journalist and publisher, editor-in-chief of weekly magazine Najwyższy Czas!. Sommer graduated from the University of Warsaw Department of Journalism and Political Science, and received his Ph.D. in sociology at the School of Social Sciences of the Polish Academy of Sciences Institute of Philosophy and Sociology.

Sommer began his career writing for Warsaw daily Express Wieczorny. Later, he worked as a journalist for Academic Weekly Auditorium and newspapers Nowy Świat, and Życie. In 1995 he became a contributing writer to weekly magazines Najwyższy Czas!, and Lux. In the following year, Sommer became the Editor-in-chief of Lux and subsequently, deputy chief of Najwyższy Czas! (1996–1999 and 2004–2007); and its Editor-in-chief (in 1999–2003 and, from 2007 until now). He also writes for the Foreign Department of Super Express. In 2002 Sommer co-founded 2S Media group which owns the monthly GIGA Sport, published also in German since 2004 as the GIGA Sport – Deutschland. In 2007, along with business partners, Sommer took over the weekly magazine Najwyższy Czas!.

== Political life ==
Sommer is the vice-president of the Globalization Institute, a free-market think tank based in Gliwice.

In the 2009 European Parliament election Sommer ran on the list of KW Libertas for the Pomeranian constituency, and in 2010 became involved with the political party Liberty and Lawfulness during local elections.

== Book publications ==
Sommer wrote a book entitled Rozstrzelać Polaków. Ludobójstwo Polaków w Związku Sowieckim w latach 1937–1938. Dokumenty z Centrali (transl. Execute the Poles: The Genocide of Poles in the Soviet Union (1937–1938). Documents from Headquarters), devoted the Polish Operation of the NKVD.

Other works:

- Poza Unią jest życie (There's life outside the EU), Arwil, Warsaw 2004 (with Miłosz Marczuk)
- Czy można usprawiedliwić podatki? (Is it possible to justify taxes?), 3S Media, Warsaw 2006, ISBN 978-83-923894-6-0
- Korwin – wolnościowiec z misją (Korwin – libertarian with a mission), 3S Media, Warsaw 2009
- Michalkiewicz – nie bójcie się prawdy (Michalkiewicz – do not be afraid of the truth), 3S Media, Warsaw 2009, ISBN 978-83-7673-008-0
- Absurdy Unii Europejskiej (Absurdities of the European Union), Vesper, Poznań 2009
- Rozstrzelać Polaków. Ludobójstwo Polaków w Związku Sowieckim – dokumenty z centrali (Shoot the Poles. Genocide of Poles in the Soviet Union - the documents from the headquarters), 3S Media, Warsaw 2010 (development and translation), ISBN 978-83-7673-020-2
- Wolniewicz – zdanie własne (Wolniewicz – one's own opinion), 3S Media, Warsaw 2010
