= Karina Bosak =

Polish far-right politician (born 1988)

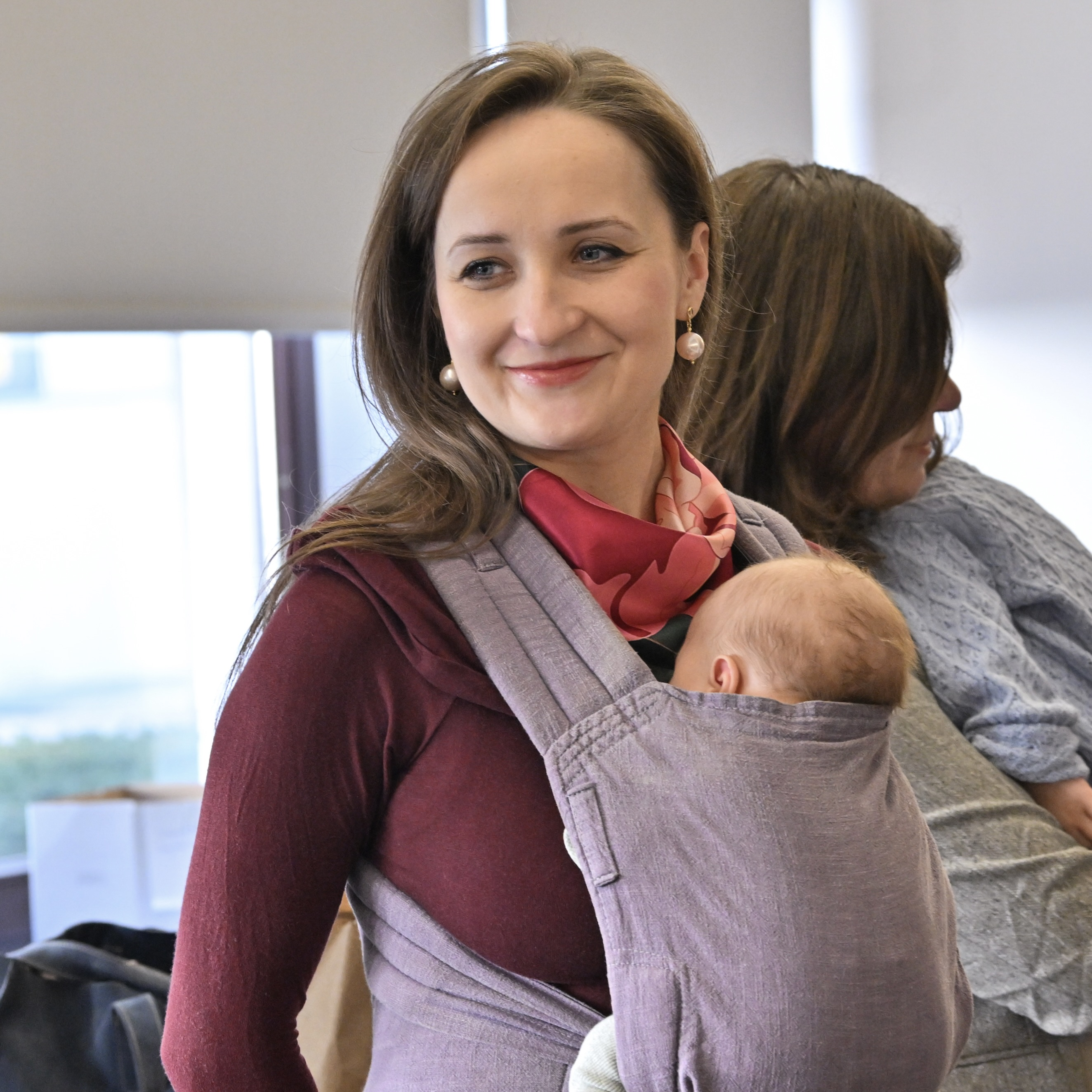
- Bosak in attendance at a conference about demographic policy at the Sejm, 2026

Member of the Sejm
- Incumbent
- Assumed office 15 October 2023
- Constituency: Warsaw II

Personal details
- Born: Karina Anna Walinowicz; 1988 (age 37–38)
- Party: National Movement
- Other political affiliations: Confederation Liberty and Independence
- Spouse: Krzysztof Bosak (m. 2020)

Karina Anna Bosak (née Walinowicz; born 1988) is a Polish far-right politician and lawyer of the National Movement (RN). She was elected a member of the Sejm in the 2023 parliamentary election. Since 2014, she has worked as a lawyer at Ordo Iuris. In 2020, she married Krzysztof Bosak.

In the 2023 elections, she ran from 2nd place on the Confederation's list in the suburban district (as a representative of RN). She won a mandate as an MP of the 10th term with 21,217 votes, ahead of Janusz Korwin-Mikke, who ran from the 1st place. In the Sejm, she sat on the Constitutional Responsibility Committee and the Legislative Committee.
