= Najwyższy Czas! =

Polish conservative magazine

- Editor: Tomasz Sommer
- Categories: News magazine
- Frequency: Weekly
- Founded: 1990
- Company: Oficyna Konserwatystów i Liberałów
- Country: Poland
- Based in: Warsaw
- Website: Official website
- ISSN: 0867-0366
- OCLC: 45090812

Najwyższy Czas! (Polish pronunciation: [najˈvɘʂ.ʂɘ ˈt͡ʂas], About Time!) is a Polish far-right libertarian conservative sociopolitical weekly news magazine, published since 31 March 1990 by Oficyna Konserwatystów i Liberałów, owned by Janusz Korwin-Mikke and connected with the Confederation Liberty and Independence and especially in last years, Confederation of the Polish Crown.
