= Congress of the New Right =

Congress of the New Right Kongres Nowej Prawicy
- Abbreviation: KNP
- Leader: Stanisław Żółtek
- Founder: Janusz Korwin-Mikke
- Founded: 25 March 2011
- Merger of: Liberty and Lawfulness; Splittings from Real Politics Union
- Headquarters: Lotnicza 10, Kraków
- Ideology: Right-wing populism; Hard Euroscepticism; Economic liberalism
- Political position: Right-wing to far-right
- European affiliation: Movement for a Europe of Nations and Freedom (2014–2019)
- European Parliament group: Europe of Nations and Freedom (2015–2019)
- Colors: Black; Red; Blue
- Sejm: 0 / 460
- Senate: 0 / 100
- European Parliament: 0 / 53
- Regional assemblies: 0 / 552

The Congress of the New Right (Polish: Kongres Nowej Prawicy, Nowa Prawica or just KNP) is a right-wing Eurosceptic political party in Poland. The party was founded on 25 March 2011 by Janusz Korwin-Mikke, from the merger of the Liberty and Lawfulness (WiP) with several members of the Real Politics Union (UPR). The former leader Korwin-Mikke was ousted from the party in 2015, upon revelations that he had fathered 2 children out of wedlock. The party assumed the official name Congress of the New Right on 12 May 2011.

== History ==
The political organisation KNP was founded by supporters of Liberty and Lawfulness leader, Janusz Korwin-Mikke, who finished fourth in the 2010 Polish presidential election, receiving 2.5% votes (over 400,000). Taking advantage of his rising popularity, a group of political activists derived from both the former party of Janusz Korwin-Mikke, the Real Politics Union, and the Liberty and Lawfulness (dissolved three days earlier), came together on 9 October 2010 to form a new party: the "Real Politics Union – Liberty and Lawfulness". The new party took part in the 2010 local Polish elections, represented by commissioner Tomasz Sommer . The committee put forward candidates in thirteen voivodeships. The "Congress of the New Right" equaled the results of its leader in two voivodeships, Lesser Poland (2.69%) and Mazovia (2.32%). In terms of overall country-wide votes, the party concluded the election at seventh place. The committee had candidates for the position of mayor in some main cities in Poland in the same 2010 elections. Janusz Korwin-Mikke ended fourth in the mayoral election in Warsaw, gaining 3.90% of the eligible votes. Afterwards, the new party, the Congress of the New Right was founded on 25 March 2011, a day after the "Real Politics Union – Liberty and Lawfulness" had ceased to exist.

== Activity ==
The first meeting of the new party was held on 16 April 2011 in the Palace of Culture and Science. Over 2,000 sympathizers attended the meeting, including notable people like Krzysztof Rybiński, Andrzej Sośnierz, Krzysztof Bosak, Romuald Szeremietiew, Stanisław Michalkiewicz or Tomasz Sommer. One month later, "Congress of the New Right" was formally acknowledged on 12 April 2011 as a new name of the party.

The Congress registered an electoral committee under the name "Nowa Prawica - Janusz Korwin Mikke" for the upcoming 2011 parliamentary elections. The National Election Committee ("Państwowa Komisja Wyborcza", PKW) accepted the party in 21 of 41 electoral districts, refusing the Congress to enlist for the rest on the grounds of not delivering a 'list of supporters' on time. The decision was generally received as controversial. The PKW rejected to submit motives of the refusal despite being constitutionally obliged to do so. This move effectively denied the Congress of the New Right access to the Polish Parliament as it effectively had to receive twice the votes of the constitutional threshold of five percent in order to be elected to the Polish Parliament. The party could not put forward candidates in most of the largest cities in Poland, including Warsaw, where Janusz Korwin-Mikke was denied enlistment. Representatives of other parties (UPR, LPR and others) were put on the lists of the Congress of the New Right. In the elections to the Polish Senate the party was allowed to put forward candidates on 10 out of 100 electoral districts (the number of electoral districts differ for the Polish Parliament and the Polish Senate). The elections were disastrous for the party as it received merely 1.06% of the popular vote (151,837), a result that placed it at seventh place. Therefore, none of the party's candidates were voted into the Senate.

On 9 January 2013, The KNP Youth Section was officially founded. Access is granted to both young adults as well as those who have not reached the age of majority (18).

In 2015, party leader Janusz Korwin-Mikke, along with party's MP Przemysław Wipler and MEP Robert Iwaszkiewicz split into Liberty, whose leader became Janusz Korwin-Mikke.

In the parliamentary election in 2015, KNP stood for the Sejm from the lists of Kukiz'15, gaining one MP.

== Aims ==
KNP is against interfering with the current election system. It calls for enacting a new libertarian-minded constitution, reduction of the size of the Polish Parliament and forming a State Council, which would replace the Parliament as the legislative branch. KNP is also in favor of more regional autonomy.

The party's main priorities are lowering taxes (including the abolition of income tax) and reducing the national debt by cutting down social programs and allowing the economy to flourish.

KNP is for the total decriminalisation of using and producing drugs.

KNP is for establishing a presidential system instead of the current parliamentary system.

KNP opposes same-sex marriage.

The party is for the restoration of capital punishment.

The party supports Polish withdrawal from the European Union and wants to maintain the Polish zloty and to make it a gold-based currency.

KNP is anti-abortion, only allowing in case of risk for the mother's life, and against euthanasia.

== Election results ==
=== Presidential ===
Election year	Candidate	1st round		2nd round	
Election year	Candidate	Votes	%	Votes	%
2015	Jacek Wilk	68,186	0.46 (#10)		
2020	Stanisław Żółtek	45,419	0.23 (#7)		
2025	Grzegorz Braun	1,242,917	6.34 (#4)		

=== Sejm ===
Election	Votes	%	Seats	+/–	Government
2011	151,837	1.1	0 / 460	New	Extra-parliamentary
2015	4,852	0.03	1 / 460	▲1	Opposition

=== Senate ===
Election	Seats	+/–
2011	0 / 100	New
2015	0 / 100	0

=== European Parliament ===
Election	Leader	Votes	%	Seats	+/–	EP Group
2014	Janusz Korwin-Mikke	505,586	7.55 (#4)	4 / 51	New	ENF
2019	Stanisław Żółtek	29,195	0.25 (#7)	0 / 51	▼4	–
2019	In a joint list with PolExit, that didn't win any seat.					
2024	Stanisław Żółtek	29,195	0.25 (#7)	0 / 53	0	–
2024	In a joint list with PolExit and FdR, that didn't win any seat.					

=== Regional assemblies ===
Election	%	Seats	+/–
2014	3.89	0 / 555	
