= Stanisław Żółtek =

Polish politician

Stanisław Żółtek MEP
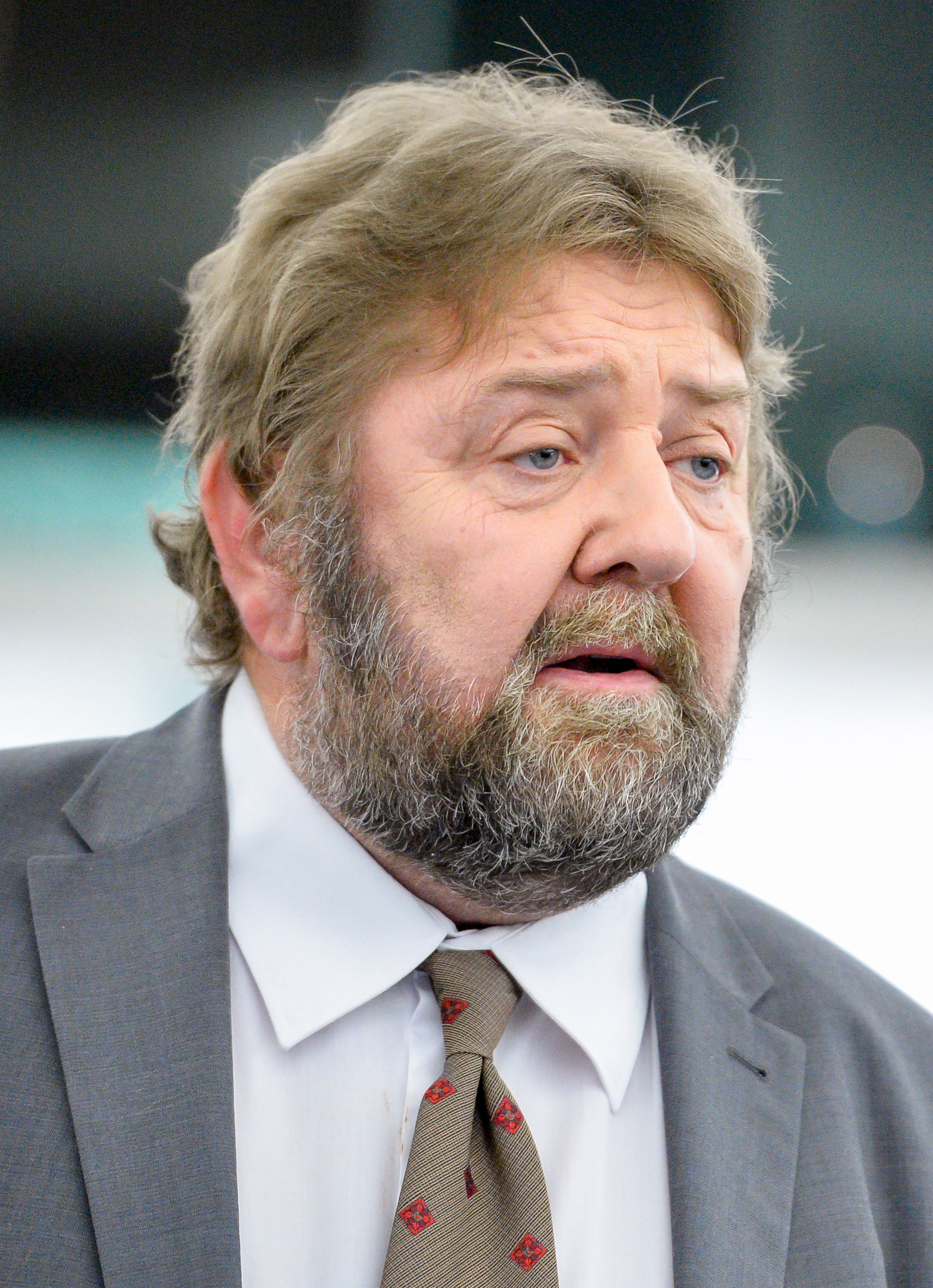
- Stanisław Żółtek during a speech in the European Parliament (2018)

Member of the European Parliament for Lesser Poland and Świętokrzyskie
- In office 1 July 2014 – 1 July 2019

Personal details
- Born: 7 May 1956 (age 70) Kraków, Poland
- Party: Congress of the New Right

Stanisław Józef Żółtek (born 7 May 1956) is a Polish politician who is the current leader of the Congress of the New Right. He was a Member of the European Parliament representing Lesser Poland and Świętokrzyskie. He was a candidate for president of Poland in the 2020 Polish presidential election.

== Biography ==
=== Education and early life ===
Stanisław Żółtek graduated from the XIII Liceum Ogólnokształcące im. Bohaterów Westerplatte in Kraków. He then studied mathematics at the Jagiellonian University and obtained his certificate. During the Polish Peoples Republic, he supported himself financially by tutoring and undertaking work outside of Poland. From 1987-1993, he ran his own business.

In February 2002, he was detained by the Central Bureau of Investigation and temporarily arrested on charges of bribery. He was suspected of accepting a bribe of PLN 20,000 in the second half of 1998, while serving as vice-president of Kraków. He was released four months later and acquitted of the charges in 2006. In June 2010, he was awarded PLN 120,000 for the unjustified arrest.

=== Political career ===
In 1991 he joined the Real Politics Union (UPR) and during his membership he successfully ran for a parliamentary seat in the Kraków Voivodeship in 1993.

In 1994, he won a seat in the Kraków City Council. From 1997-1998, as part of the local coalition of the Freedom Union and the UPR, he served as vice-president of Kraków on the board of Józef Lassota. In 1998, he was reelected. In the 2001 elections, he unsuccessfully ran for the Sejm on behalf of the Civic Platform as part of an electoral agreement between the UPR and the PO.

In 2002 he ran again as a candidate for local government elections on behalf of the UPR - this time for the Małopolska regional assembly. The UPR did not reach the electoral threshold.

He ran unsuccessfully in the following elections: the 2005 Polish Parliamentary Elections, he was removed from the list of candidates of the Liberty and Lawfulness party. The 2006 Polish local elections and the 2007 Polish parliamentary elections.

On May 14, 2008, due to the lack of registrations of UPR candidates in the by-elections in Krosno the UPR chairman, Wojciech Popiela resigned from his position as chairman. Stanisław Żółtek, as the vice-president of the party, automatically became the acting chairman. He held this position until the next election for chairman, which took place on June 7. The following year he ran in the 2009 European Parliamentary election in district no. 10.

In 2010, during a meeting in Kraków the UPR elected Stanisław Żółtek as the new president of the party. The choice was contested by some party activists gathered around Magdalena Kocik, who had previously been elected president by her supporters. At a conference organized by the WiP, Żółtek supported Janusz Korwin-Mikke's candidacy in the 2010 presidential election on behalf of the UPR. In the same month he was excluded from the UPR by the parties supporters of Magdalena Kocik. He later attempted to appeal the decision, but was denied by the District Court of Warsaw.

In the meantime, he ran in the 2010 local elections on behalf of Janusz Korwin-Mikke Voters Movement Electoral Committee for Mayor of Kraków, taking 4th place out of 6 candidates and receiving 1.56% of the votes. In the second round, he supported Jacek Majchrowski. He also unsuccessfully ran for Kraków councilor.

He became the vice-president of the Congress of the New Right party on 25 March 2011. On behalf of this party, he ran for Sejm in the 2011 elections. In the 2014 European Parliamentary elections, as the leader of the KNP in the Kraków district, he was elected as Member of the European Parliament of the 8th term, receiving 27,995 votes. During his term, he was noted as being frequently absent. At the end of his term, he had a 74.4% voter turnout.

In January 2015, together with Michał Marusik and other members of the Congress of the New Right, he supported the ousting of Janusz Korwin-Mikke from the position of the party's president. In June 2015, he joined the newly established European Parliamentary Group, Europe of Nations and Freedom. On January 28, 2017, he took over as the president of the KNP.
