= Leszek Samborski =

Polish politician (born 1955)

Leszek Samborski (born 19 May 1955 in Dębica) is a Polish politician, formerly a member of Real Politics Union and now Civic Platform and Sejm deputy (June 2004 - 2005).
