= Liberty and Lawfulness =

Liberty and Lawfulness Wolność i Praworządność
- Abbreviation: WiP
- Leader: Janusz Korwin-Mikke
- Founded: 22 June 2005
- Dissolved: 24 March 2011
- Succeeded by: Congress of the New Right
- Headquarters: ul. 3-go Maja 100, 05-420 Józefów
- Ideology: Conservative libertarianism Libertarianism

Liberty and Lawfulness (Polish: Wolność i Praworządność), abbreviated to WiP, was a short-lived political party in Poland, legally formed on 30 December 2009 and discontinued by the State Board of Elections on 6 October 2010. It was composed of conservatives, libertarians, and monarchists. The party was led by Janusz Korwin-Mikke, "an electoral failure since 20 years ago", wrote Dziennik Gazeta Prawna magazine.

== Background ==
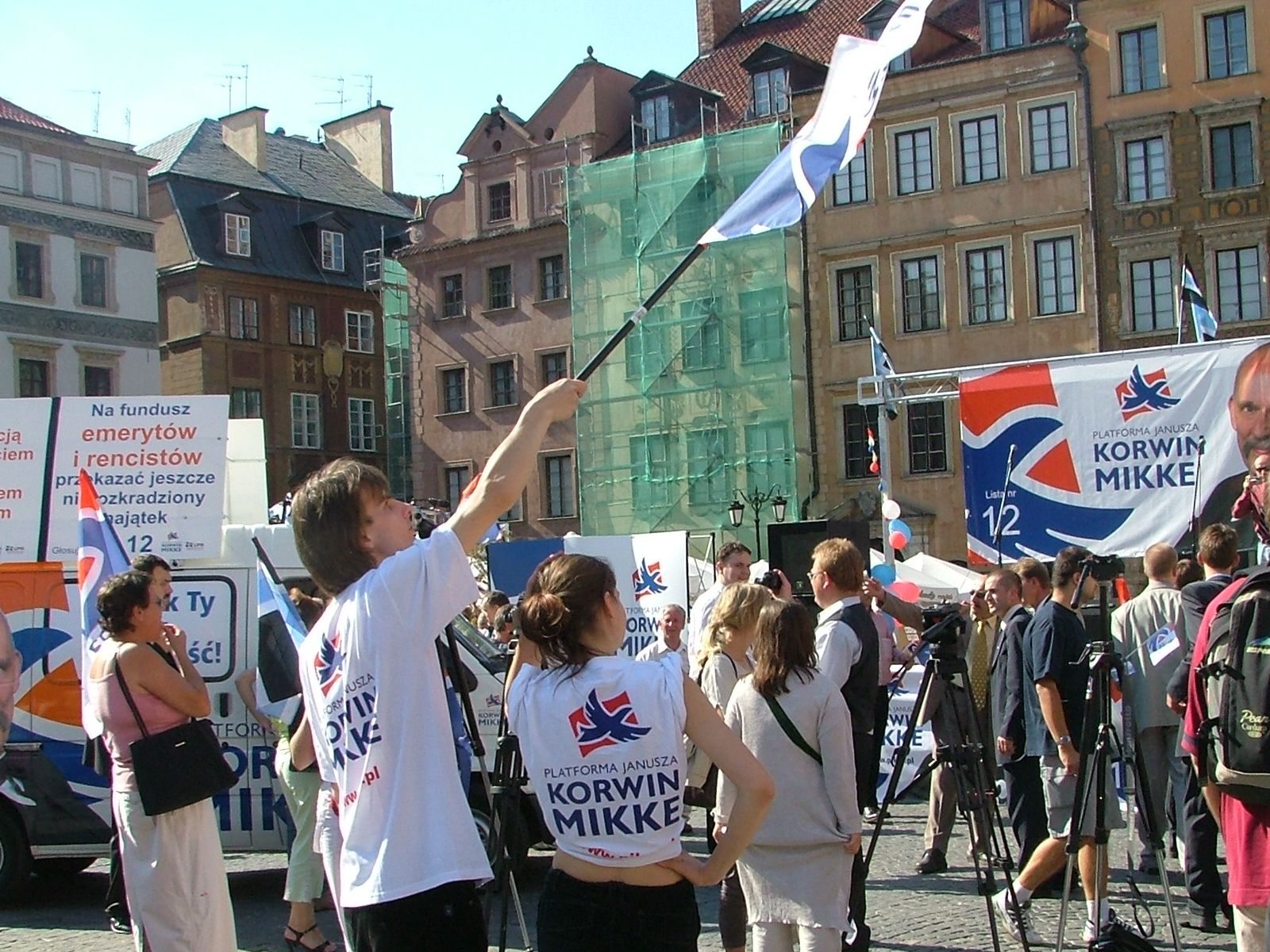
WiP supporters at the 2005 elections

After the dismemberment of Wolność i Praworządność, its former members joined an electoral alliance with Korwin-Mikke's former party, the Real Politics Union (UPR). On 25 March 2011, the party was formally registered with the Real Politics Union with the name change. The new party, first called 'Real Politics Union - Liberty and Lawfulness', was renamed to Congress of the New Right on 12 May 2011. Its leader, Korwin-Mikke declared that "invalids are similar to women with pimples who try not to leave their homes," informed Nowy Ekran SA.
