= Janusz Korwin-Mikke =

Polish politician and publicist (born 1942)

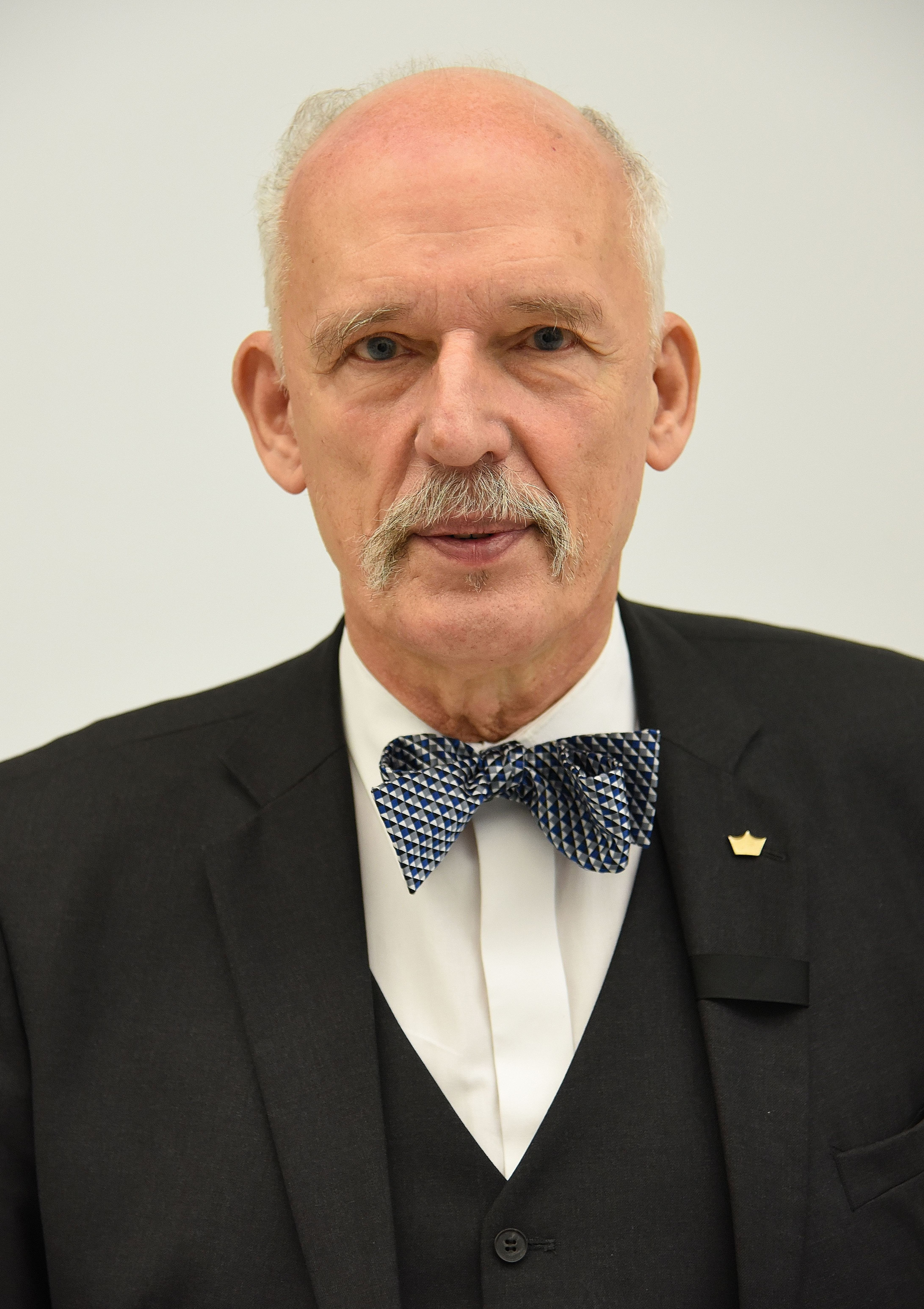
- Korwin-Mikke in 2016

Chairman of New Hope
- In office 22 January 2015 – 15 October 2022
- Preceded by: Position established
- Succeeded by: Sławomir Mentzen

Member of the Sejm
- In office 12 November 2019 – 12 November 2023
- Constituency: No. 19 (Warsaw I)
- In office 25 November 1991 – 31 May 1993
- Constituency: No. 18 (Poznań)

Member of the European Parliament for Silesian
- In office 1 July 2014 – 1 March 2018

Personal details
- Born: Janusz Ryszard Korwin-Mikke; 27 October 1942 (age 84) Warsaw, General Government (German-occupied Poland)
- Party: KORWiN (since 2024) (Note: Korwin-Mikke split from the New Hope party and founded a new party called KORWiN.)
- Other political affiliations: SD (1962–1982); Real Politics Union (1987–2009); WiP (2009–2011); KNP (2011–2015); KORWiN/New Hope (2015–2023)
- Spouses: Ewa Mieczkowska (m. 1966; div. 1973); Małgorzata Szmit (m. 1993, divorced); Dominika Sibiga (m. 2016)
- Children: 8
- Relatives: Bartłomiej Pejo (son-in-law)
- Education: University of Warsaw (MPhil)

Janusz Ryszard Korwin-Mikke (Note: Polish pronunciation: [ˈjanuʂ ˈkɔrvʲin ˈmʲikkɛ]) (born 27 October 1942), also known by his initials JKM or simply as Korwin, is a Polish politician and author. He was a member of the European Parliament from 2014 until 2018. He was the leader of the Congress of the New Right (KNP), which was formed in 2011 from Liberty and Lawfulness, which he led from its formation in 2009, and the Real Politics Union, which he led from 1990 to 1997 and from 1999 to 2003. He was the chairman of the party New Hope until his resignation on 15 October 2022, and from 2019 to 2023 a member of the Sejm, elected from the electoral list of Confederation Liberty and Independence. In 2024, he founded KORWiN. Korwin-Mikke is widely considered to be a paleolibertarian and far-right politician.

== Biography ==
=== Birth and early life ===
Janusz Korwin-Mikke was born in German-occupied Warsaw on 27 October 1942. He was the only child of Ryszard Mikke (6 February 1911 – 25 April 1966) and Maria Rosochacka (3 April 1917 – 4 August 1944). His father, Ryszard, was the head of the engineering department of the State Aviation Works. Korwin-Mikke's uncle, Tadeusz Mikke, was a Lieutenant Colonel in the Polish Cavalry during the Second World War, he died on 12 September 1939 while commanding 15th Poznań Uhlan Regiment at the Battle of the Bzura, during the September Campaign.

In 1944, his mother, Maria, was killed during the Warsaw Uprising against the occupying German forces. From then, he was under the care of his grandmother and later his stepmother. Korwin-Mikke's great-grandfather was Gustaw Izydor Mücke, son of Samuel Beniamin Mücke (who was a brewer in Kielce).

The Korwin-Mikke family, with its origins in the Kingdom of Sweden, migrated through the Electorate of Saxony to Poland, following the Great Famine of 1695–1697, alongside Augustus II the Strong, after he was elected king of the Polish-Lithuanian Commonwealth in 1697. The Germanic surname Mücke was polonized to Mikke after the family received the Korwin coat of arms. Before converting to Catholicism, Korwin-Mikke's family adhered to the Augsburg Confession, which is the primary confession of faith of the Lutheran Church and one of the most significant documents of the Protestant Reformation.

Korwin-Mikke is a distant relative of Hellmuth von Mücke, an officer of the Kaiserliche Marine, the navy of the German Empire, in the early 20th century and World War I. He is also related to Jerzy Mikke, a Polish historian, publicist and writer.

=== Detention by communists ===
Korwin-Mikke studied at the Faculty of Mathematics and Faculty of Philosophy of the Warsaw University. For his anti-communist activities, in 1964 he was detained by the communist authorities while studying psychology, law, philosophy and sociology. During the 1968 Polish political crisis, he was again arrested, jailed and expelled from the university for his participation in student protests.

Despite his anti-communist activities, Korwin-Mikke was reinstated and allowed to finish his studies with the dean Klemens Szaniawski. He successfully defended his master thesis Metodologiczne aspekty poglądów Stephena Toulmina (eng. Methodological aspects of Stephen Toulmin's views), written under the guidance of Henryk Jankowski.

=== Meeting with Milton Friedman ===
Korwin-Mikke met with Milton Friedman when Friedman toured Europe advocating free-market policies. Friedman wrote about Janusz Korwin-Mikke in his memoirs:

Janusz Korwin-Mikke, with whom I corresponded, had been active before liberation as an underground publisher, bringing out a translation of Capitalism and Freedom and Hayek's Road to Serfdom, as well as other libertarian literature. Subsequently, he ran for president on a strict libertarian platform. At the time we were in Warsaw, his Union of Real Policy was housed in a former dwelling that was a literal maze of small offices, all occupied by young people actively working on spreading the libertarian gospel. We had very good, lively discussions with them.

— Milton Friedman, Two lucky people: Memoirs by Milton Friedman, Rose D. Friedman

=== Far-right politics ===
From 1962 to 1982, he was a member of the Democratic Party. In August 1980 he supported the political strike of the Szczecin Shipyard workers, and later he was an adviser of NSZZ Indywidualnego Rzemiosła "Solidarność" (Independent Craftsmen's Union). In 1987 he founded a national conservative, economically liberal political party called Ruch Polityki Realnej (Movement of Real Politics), later renamed - Unia Polityki Realnej (UPR, Union of Real Politics).

In 1990, he established a libertarian conservative sociopolitical weekly newspaper Najwyższy Czas! (About Time!).

In 1991, Korwin-Mikke became a member of the Sejm, between 1991 and 1993, during the first parliamentary term after the establishment of the Third Polish Republic. Notably, during his time as deputy, he was the originator of the vetting resolution of 28 May 1992, which obliged the Minister of Internal Affairs to disclose the names of all politicians who had been communist secret police agents. The disclosed list contained numerous prominent politicians of most political factions. This led to the dissolution of the Cabinet of Jan Olszewski during the Night of the Folders – a term used in journalism to describe the events of the night from 4 to 5 June 1992, associated with the dismissal of the government of Jan Olszewski.

Korwin-Mikke is a perennial candidate in Polish presidential elections, obtaining 2.4% of the vote in 1995, 1.43% in 2000, 1,4% in 2005, 2.48% in 2010, 3.3% in 2015.

He is a self-declared monarchist who claims that democracy is "the most stupid form of government ever conceived".

In 2008, his blog was the most popular political blog in Poland.

He frequently refers to figures such as Frédéric Bastiat, Alexis de Tocqueville, Friedrich Hayek, Milton Friedman, Margaret Thatcher and Nicolás Gómez Dávila, among others.

=== Member of the European Parliament ===
In the 2014 European Parliament election, Korwin-Mikke was elected as a Member of the European Parliament, standing as a candidate of the Congress of the New Right. On 28 January 2018, he officially announced his intention to resign from the European Parliament and return to Polish politics. He was replaced by Dobromir Sośnierz.

=== Return to Polish politics ===
On 6 December 2018, the decision to jointly participate in the European elections was made by Korwin-Mikke's KORWiN party and the National Movement party. In January 2019, the coalition was joined by Grzegorz Braun, Piotr Liroy-Marzec and Kaja Godek. In February 2019, the coalition began using the name "Koalicja ProPolska" (ProPoland Coalition). However, on 27 February 2019, the official name "Confederation KORWiN Braun Liroy Nationalists" was announced. In March 2019, an application for the registration of a party under this name was submitted. Later on the new political entity would be called Confederation Liberty and Independence.

In 2019, Korwin-Mikke was elected as deputy in the lower chamber of the Polish Parliament (Sejm), effectively returning to Polish politics after 26 years of absence.

On 15 October 2022, Janusz Korwin-Mikke resigned from his position as the chairman of the KORWiN party. Stepping into his role is the former vice president of the party, Sławomir Mentzen. Under new leadership, the party underwent a rebranding and is now known as New Hope (Nowa Nadzieja).

During the 2025 Polish presidential election, he was closely associated with Grzegorz Braun and his campaign.

=== Electoral defeat and suspension ===
Soon before the election, during an interview Korwin-Mikke said "There are girls that are 12-13 years old and are mature and there are girls that are 19 years old and are immature. State shouldn't decide when girl achieved sexual maturity, it is determined by nature."

During the 2023 Polish parliamentary election, Korwin-Mikke was defeated by Karina Bosak, the wife of the chairman of National Movement, Krzysztof Bosak. She achieved a surprisingly good result, garnering support from over 21 thousand voters. In doing so, she surpassed the party's number one candidate, Janusz Korwin-Mikke, who received votes from just under 9.5 thousand people and consequently did not secure a seat in the Sejm from the Sejm Constituency no. 20.

On 18 October 2023, the head of Confederation's electoral campaign, Witold Tumanowicz, informed the Polish Press Agency that a decision had been made by the party court to "expel Janusz Korwin-Mikke from the Council of Leaders and suspend him" in the rights of a Confederation member, after Tumanowicz blamed Korwin-Mikke for the electoral defeat of the whole party. Tumanowicz further emphasized that "if he violates the suspension conditions, the party court will consider his removal from Confederation."

On 29 October 2023, Sławomir Mentzen, the chairman of New Hope party, announced on social media that Korwin-Mikke would not be running on the Confederation's list in the next elections. Mentzen added that he faced a "tragic choice" and stated: "Unfortunately, the responsibility for the political project, for future results, for ensuring that the effort of our candidates and supporters is not wasted, forces me to make this difficult decision."

In 2024, Korwin-Mikke split from New Hope, founding KORWiN.

== Views ==
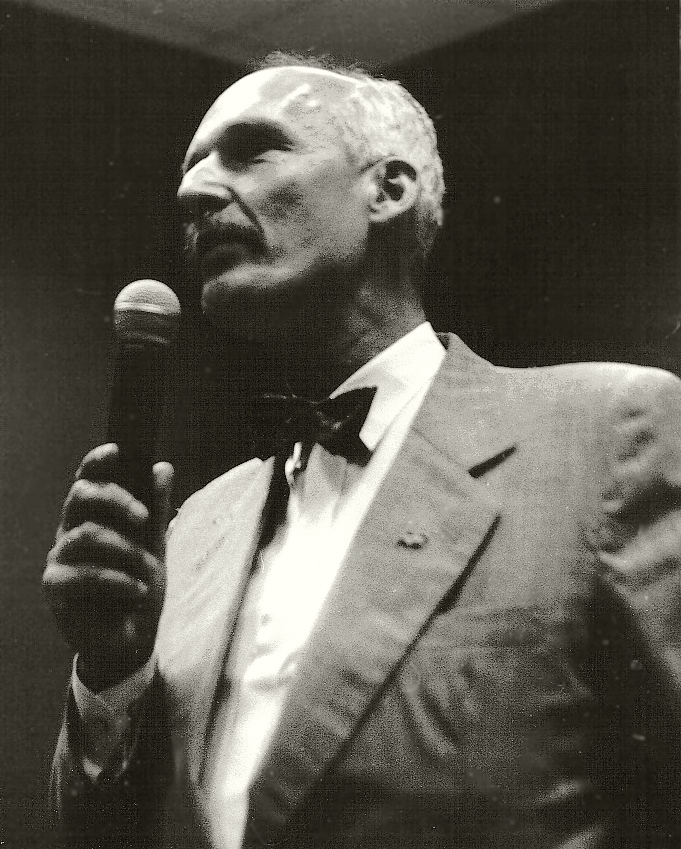
During the 2000 presidential campaign in Poland

Korwin-Mikke has been described as a "perpetual political gadfly" by Politico, and as "a colorful and abrasive character" by The Guardian.

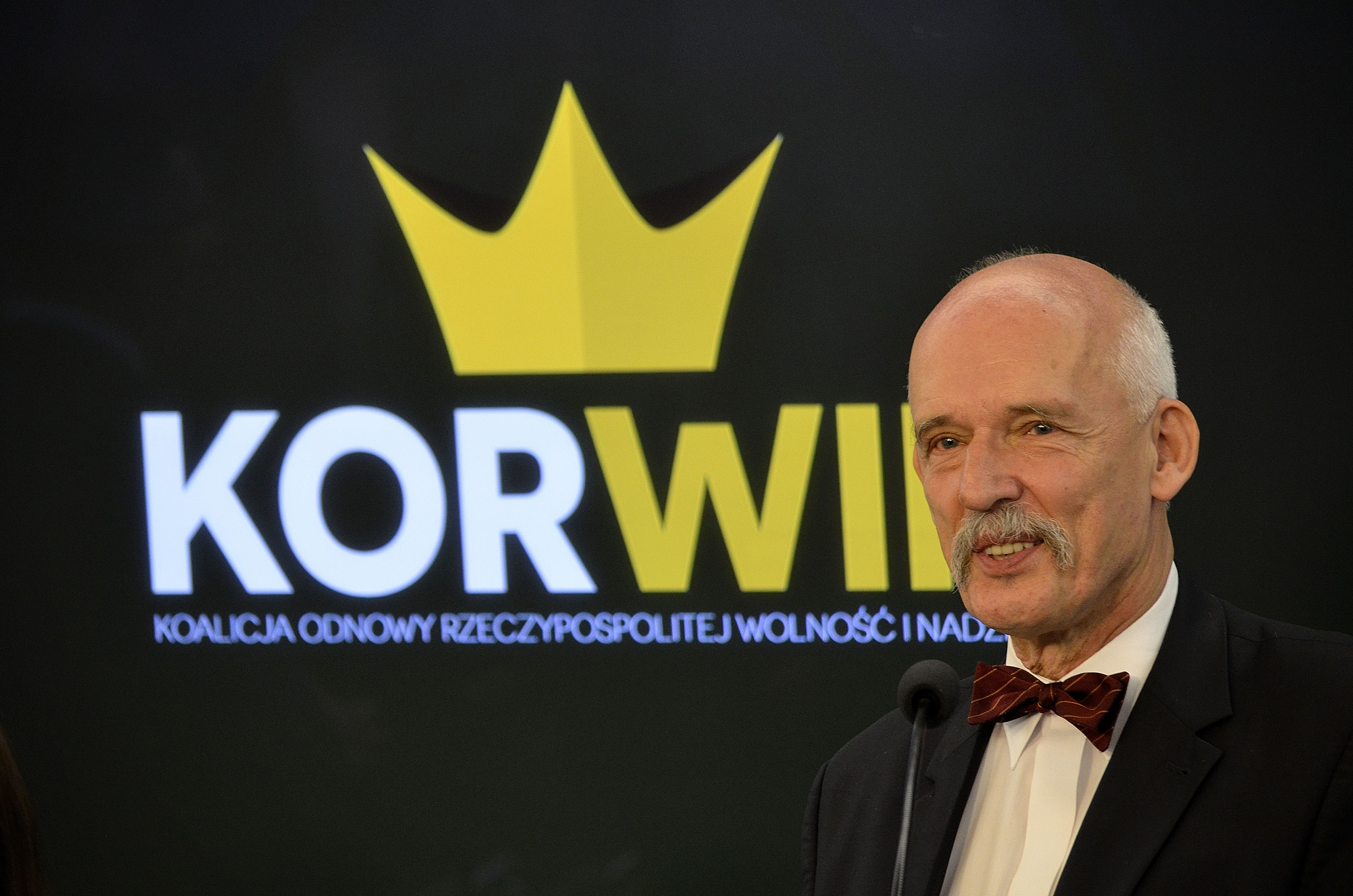
Korwin-Mikke during a press conference in the Polish Sejm, 2015

In 1991 Korwin-Mikke published his guidebook for men, "Father's Vademecum", in which he wrote many pieces of advice that have been recognized as highly controversial and sexist, such as "If you cannot resolve conflict with your wife in any way, if you cannot convince her, then, unfortunately, you have to use physical force."

At the plenary session of the European Parliament held after the assault at Charlie Hebdo, Korwin-Mikke expressed his dissatisfaction with the public reaction to those events by stating 'I am not Charlie. I am for death penalty' and presenting it to the public instead of a sign 'Je suis Charlie' held by the other MEPs.

He believes that women are, on average, less intelligent than men, citing chess results to back up his claims. He has cited Margaret Thatcher as his political model. He stated that the difference between rape and consensual sex is very subtle, saying, "Were you to understand woman's nature, sir, you would know that there is an element of rape in every sexual intercourse". He further claimed that "there is a hypothesis that the attitudes of men are passed to women they sleep with". He also said: "I am against voting rights for women. This is biology. A woman at the age of 55, when estrogen stops working, reaches the age when she can finally vote."

On 1 March 2017, Korwin-Mikke sparked controversy by stating that women were paid less than their male counterparts on average due to them being "smaller, weaker and less intelligent", during a debate in the EP regarding the gender pay gap. Two days later, Korwin-Mikke made further comments stating that there was a stereotype that "women have the same intellectual potential as men” and it “must be destroyed because it is not true.”

The situations described above, that took place in the gender pay gap debate, culminated in a court hearing. On 31 May 2018 European General Court in the Case T‑352/17 Korwin-Mikke v Parliament lifted sanctions from 14 March 2017 imposed on Korwin Mikke by the President of the Parliament, under which he was suspended for ten days from the plenary sessions of the EP. The Court in Case T-352/17 described interpretation of the provisions of the Rules of Procedure made by the President of the European Parliament and the Bureau of the Parliament, which was the basis for imposing sanctions on Korwin-Mikke, as leading to "an arbitrary restriction of the freedom of expression of MEPs".

In 2020, a Polish court overturned a rape conviction because while the victim stated it was non-consensual, she did not scream. Korwin-Mikke was one of the few voices supporting the ruling, saying on Twitter, "If they don’t scream, it shows they want it," and "This criterion has worked for 6,000 years," drawing criticism.

Following the 2023 Polish parliamentary election, Korwin-Mikke faced a defeat, losing his seat to Karina Bosak, the wife of one of the co-chairmen of Confederation, Krzysztof Bosak. In the aftermath, a controversy unfolded as Korwin-Mikke denied allegations that he had insulted Karina Bosak, after he claimed that women, in his opinion, should not be granted suffrage because men, not women, vote for women. In his own words "this is proof that women shouldn’t have the right to vote. Take a look at the results in the United States: Trump would have won if only men had voted, and if (only) women had voted, he would not have won in any state."

Additionally, he commented on Karina Bosak's candidacy, suggesting that she was there primarily for her surname and had not actively campaigned. He took to social media to refute the claims, and remarked that he was "more likely to be prosecuted for the suspicion of making Polish blood sausages from the blood of Jewish infants than for insulting women."

In 2014, Korwin-Mikke was fined by President of the European Parliament Martin Schulz for 'expressing himself in a racist manner'. The decision was taken after his speech about EU employment policy on the plenary session on 16 July, during which he said (in English): 'we have 20 million Europeans who are now negroes of Europe'. According to him the word 'negroes' was not meant as an offence, but rather referred to the song by John Lennon and Yoko Ono 'Woman is the Nigger of the world'.

During an interview with Rzeczpospolita, Korwin-Mikke expressed support for prohibiting "homosexual propaganda" in schools, as well as prohibiting the organization of Equality Marches. He claimed that "one must slaughter" those who promote gay rights.

Korwin-Mikke described Anna Grodzka, the first trans woman to be a member of Parliament in Poland, as a male when stating that Grodzka "extorted his seat in the Sejm by impersonating a woman."

He stated that the best way to deal with Muslims in Europe would be to keep them out, ban them from building mosques, and "if need be, oppose them militarily”.

Korwin-Mikke has a history of antisemitic stunts and statements. He objected to the Polish government's decision to bar Holocaust denier David Irving from entering Poland. He promoted a conspiracy theory on Jews while commenting on media reports about a custom in which residents of the town of Pruchnik beat with sticks the effigy of an Orthodox Jew. In 2020, while making comments on the COVID-19 pandemic, he stated that anti-Jewish pogroms made Jews powerful via natural selection and that rabbis may have engineered this. Korwin-Mikke denies being an antisemite.

During the 2012 Summer Paralympics, Korwin-Mikke wrote that the general public should "not see the disabled on television". On the other hand, in 2007, he set up the "Individual Development Foundation" which helps disabled people develop their skills in chess.

On 15 April 2015, the Polish news outlet Wiadomości quoted Korwin-Mikke that the snipers that shot civilians and police officers during the Maidan protests were trained in Poland and that they acted on behalf of the CIA to provoke riots. Other provocative statements include Korwin-Mikke's claim that there is no written proof that Adolf Hitler was aware of the Holocaust.

Korwin-Mikke proposed that the European Commission's Berlaymont building would be better used as a brothel. In July 2015, he was suspended from the EP after giving a Nazi salute and saying "ein Reich, ein Volk, ein Ticket" during a speech to protest against a uniform EU transport ticket. Following the beginning of protests in Belarus, Korwin made a statement praising Belarusian president Alexander Lukashenko as a hero for his opposition to the EU.

In regard to welfare, Korwin-Mikke claimed "if someone gives money to an unemployed person, he should have his hand cut off because he is destroying the morale of the people".

On 8 September 2015, Korwin-Mikke was giving a speech in EP about the European migrant crisis, during which he described immigrants unwilling to work and only interested in welfare as "human garbage". His opinion met with critical reaction of other MEPs. As a result of this, Korwin-Mikke was once more suspended from the EP for ten days and fined €3062.

Janusz Korwin-Mikke has been described as supporting Russia on a number of occasions since the 2010s. This is evidenced by his statements supporting the Russian annexation of Crimea, his official trip to the peninsula, as well as claims whitewashing Russian history and actions, and criticizing Ukraine. He appeared on Russian television as a Polish politician opposing alleged Polish “Russophobia”. Also after the 2022 Russia's invasion of Ukraine, he often uttered pro-Russian content, denying Russian responsibility for the massacre in Bucha by claiming that the Ukrainians murdered wartime collaborators, criticizing the imposition of sanctions against Russia because of the negative economic impacts of the sanctions, especially in regards to the dispute about deliveries of natural gas, suggesting that both Ukrainian heroism and Russian determination should be admired, since the Ukrainian side is receiving a substantial military support, giving it an advantage in the war, and claiming that after the war, Ukraine may attack Poland due to Ukrainian irredentist claims on Przemyśl, Chełm, Rzeszów, Gorlice and Tarnów.

== Personal life ==
Korwin identifies as a deist. Korwin has married three times in total, most recently in 2016 to Dominika Sibiga, (Note: Now Dominika Korwin-Mikke.) who met him during an UPR meeting in 2009 and is 44 years younger than him. He has eight children with four different women.

== Electoral history ==
=== Presidential ===
Election	First round				Second round			
Election	Votes	%	Position	Result	Votes	%	Position	Result
1995	428,969	2.40	(#8)	Lost				
2000	252,499	1.43	(#6)	Lost				
2005	214,116	1.43	(#6)	Lost				
2010	416,898	2.48	(#4)	Lost				
2015	486,084	3.26	(#4)	Lost				

== Publications ==
Selected works by JKM:

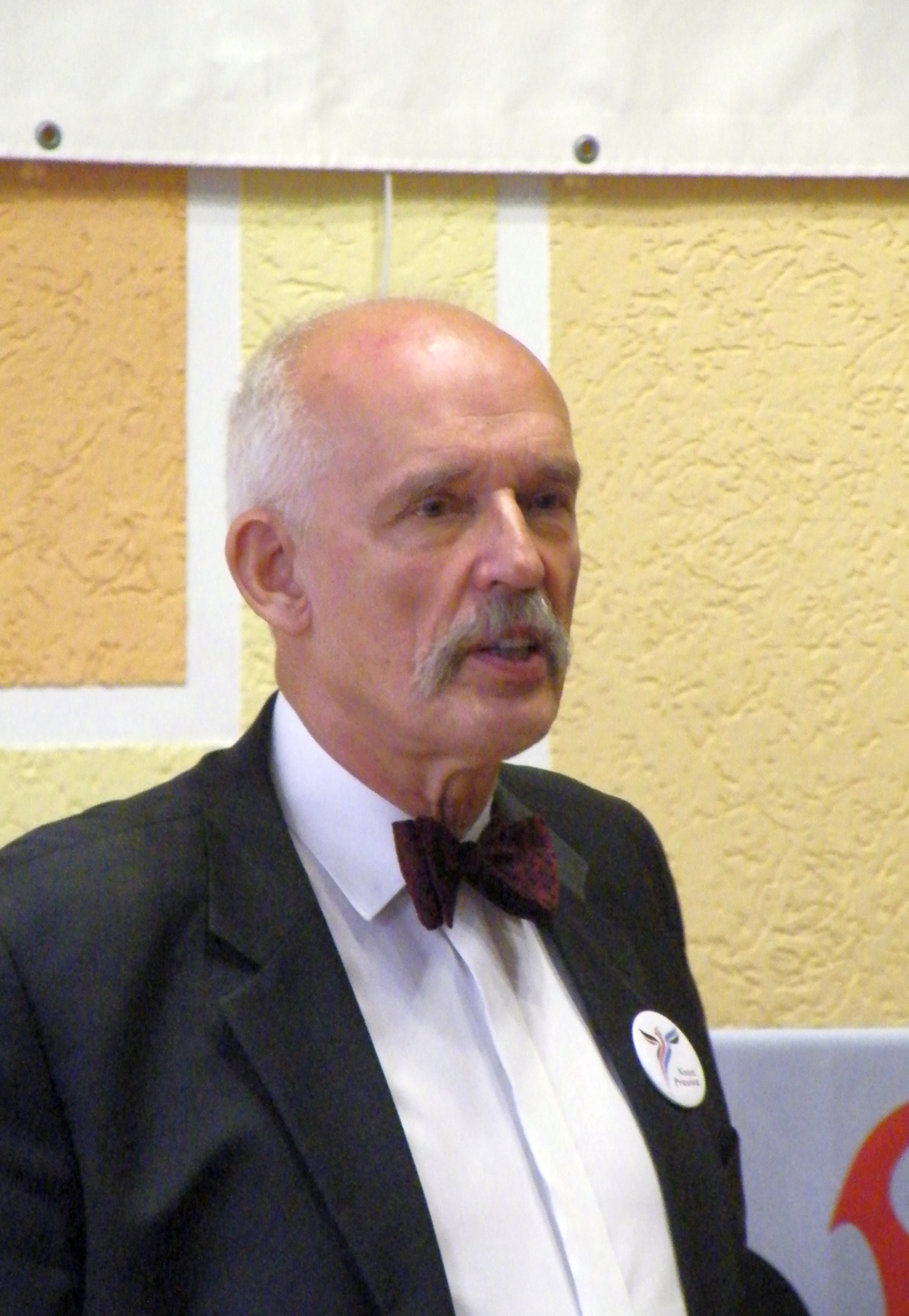
Korwin-Mikke in 2013

- Brydż (Bridge), 1976
- Program Liberałów (Liberals' Programme), 1979 – Programme of a future libertarian-conservative party.
- Ubezpieczenia (Insurances), 1979 – Critical analysis/evaluation of state-provided social insurances.
- Katechizm robotnika liberała (Catechism of a liberal worker), 1979 – Explanatory brochure ("FAQ") about the basic tenets of economic liberalism, aimed at the working class.
- Bez impasu. Elementy logiki i psychologii w brydżu (Without impasse/finesse. Elements of logic and psychology in bridge), 1980
- Brydż dla początkujących (Bridge for beginners), 1980
- Gospodarka po sierpniu 1980, czyli co proponuje P. Józef Pińkowski (Economic system after the Gdańsk Agreement, a word about Sir Józef Pińkowski's proposals), 1980 – Critical analysis/evaluation of a socialist economy, as well as the economic policies of Solidarity movement and the ruling government.
- Historia i zmiana (History and change), 1982 – On evolution of political systems and their economies.
- JK-M vs. NN (JKM vs. Anonymous reader), 1985 – Brochure of JKM's polemics with an anonymous reader.
- Liberum veto, 1986
- Brydż sportowy (Sport's bridge), 1986
- Ratujmy państwo (Let's Save the Country), 1990
- Nie tylko o Żydach (Not Only About Jews), 1991 – About inter-Polish politics.
- Prowokacja? (Provocation?), 1991 – Collection of essays from the years 1980–1990, originally published in "Gazeta Handlowa" in the city of Poznań.
- Vademecum ojca (Father's vademecum), 1991 – Aimed at the young fathers on how to raise one's children.
- "Rząd rżnie głupa" – czyli mowy sejmowe (The government is playing dumb – Sejm speeches), 1993
- Wizja parlamentu w nowej konstytucji Rzeczypospolitej Polskiej (Vision of parliament within the new constitution of a Polish Republic), 1994
- Kara śmierci (Death penalty), 1995 – Analytical, pro-capital punishment brochure.
- U progu wolności (At the doorstep of freedom/liberty), 1995 – Collection of essays from the years 1981–1995, originally published in various sources.
- Niebezpieczne ubezpieczenia (Dangerous insurances), 2000 – Critical analysis/evaluation of insurances and their negative influences on society's progress.
- Ekonomikka (Economikks), 2001 – Collected essays on economic subjects, chosen by Zdzisław Kościelak.
- Rok 2007 (Year 2007), 2001 – An account of fictional letters that JKM would write and send to the world's leaders once elected and in power.
- Dekadencja (Decadence), 2002
- Naprawić Polskę, no problem (To fix Poland? No problem!), 2004
- Podatki – Czyli rzecz o grabieży (Taxes – byword for robbery), 2004 – Critical analysis/evaluation of state-imposed taxes, with a focus on Poland.
- Kto tu dymi? (Who is raising a fuss here?), 2007
- Rusofoby w odwrocie (Russophobes in retreat), 2009 – Analysis and criticism of Polish foreign policy, with focus on Eastern Europe (Belarus, Ukraine, Russia).
- Świat według Korwina (World according to Korwin), 2012 – Collection of essays.
- Europa według Korwina (Europe according to Korwin), 2016 – Collection of essays, strong criticism of European Union.
