= Krzysztof Mieszkowski =

Polish theatre critic, journalist and politician (born 1956)

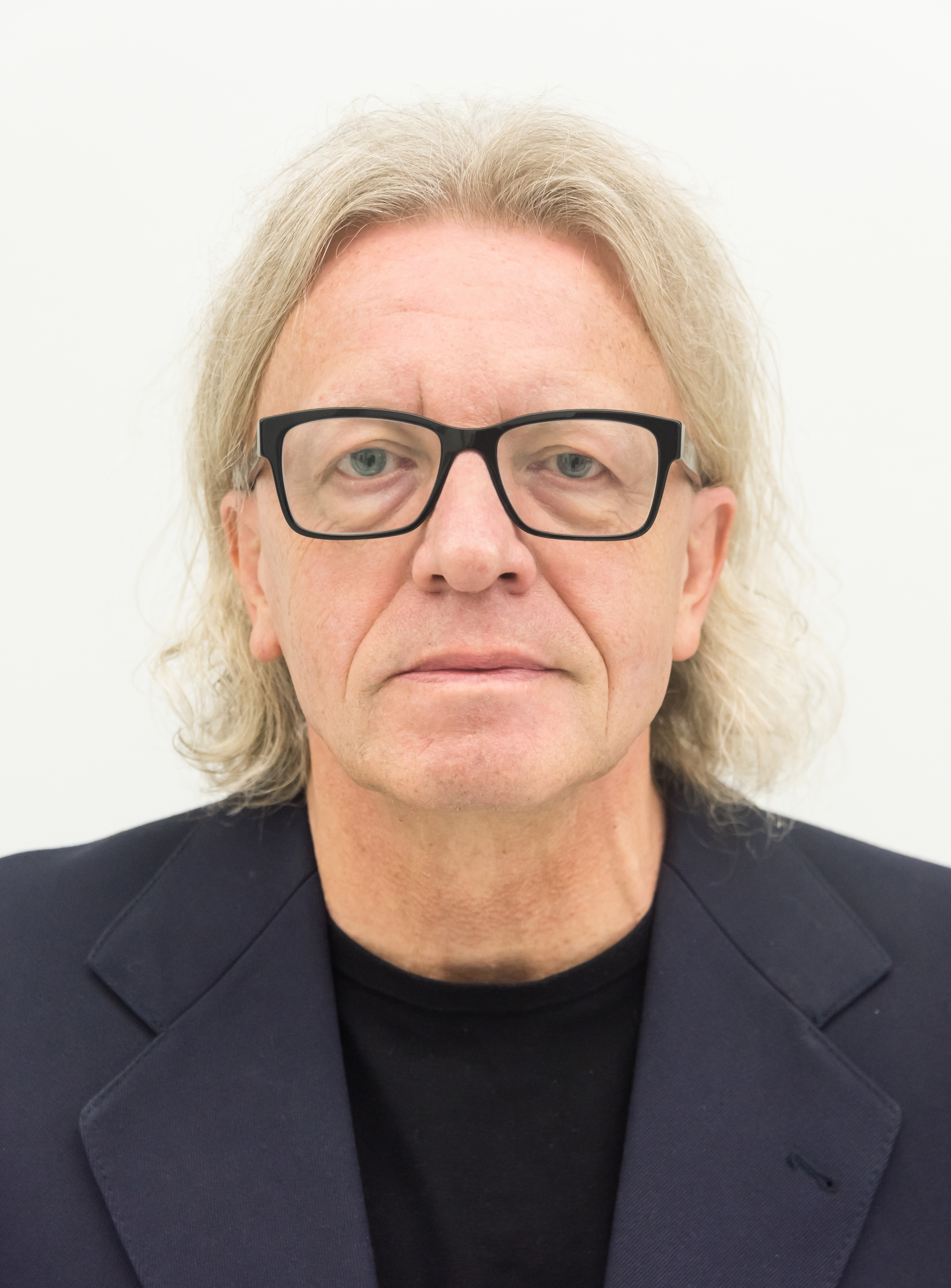
- Mieszkowski 2022

Member of the Sejm
- Incumbent
- Assumed office 2015

Personal details
- Born: 19 May 1956 (age 69) Głogów, Polish People's Republic
- Party: Civic Coalition
- Other political affiliations: Nowoczesna
- Occupation: Theatre critic, journalist, politician
- Awards: Gloria Artis Medal for Merit to Culture

Krzysztof Mieszkowski (born 19 May 1956 in Głogów) is a Polish theatre critic, journalist and politician. He is the founder and editor-in-chief of the quarterly Notatnik Teatralny, director of the Wrocław Polish Theatre in 2006–2016 and served as a member of the Sejm of the 8th, 9th and 10th term.

== Biography ==
A graduate of the 14th General Secondary School in Wrocław. He then studied cultural studies at the Institute of Cultural Studies at the Faculty of Historical and Pedagogical Sciences of the University of Wrocław; he did not complete his studies. In the 1970s, he participated in the off-theatre movement. He made his debut as a theatre critic in the monthly “Scena” at the end of that decade. In the 1980s, he collaborated with various magazines, including “Obecność”, “Iglica” and “CDN”. He was a member of the Culture Council at the Regional Executive Committee of the Solidarity movement of Lower Silesia. He was also a theatre reviewer for Radio Wrocław. He published texts about theatre in “Słowo Polskie”, “Gazeta Wyborcza”, “Polityka”, "Teatr" and "Didaskalia".

In 1991, he founded a quarterly devoted to the art of theatre, Notatnik Teatralny. It published illustrated notebooks devoted to the achievements of Polish theatre artists, as well as issues related to this creative activity. The magazine founded by Krzysztof Mieszkowski received the President of Wrocław Award (1993) and the City of Wrocław Award (2001).

In parallel with publishing the magazine, Krzysztof Mieszkowski hosted the Radio Notatnik Teatralny programme on PRW. He created Szkice o teatrze for TVP1. In 1993–1994 he was the literary director of the Wrocław Polish Theatre, in 1995–2001 on TVP2 he prepared and hosted his own programme Magazyn teatralny. In 2001–2003 he led the culture and reportage department at Radio Wrocław. He also collaborated with radio stations Trójka and Dwójka and with TVP Wrocław, where in 1999–2000 he was responsible for the Television Theatre.

For TVP Polonia he created the series Spotkania na Świebodzkim, conceived as a presentation of people from culture and art. He was also a member of the programme board of the Television Theatre. As a juror he participated in theatre festivals in Poland, including the International Theatre Festival "Without Borders" in Cieszyn, Kalisz Theatre Meetings, Opole Theatre Confrontations "Klasyka Polska", the Small Form Theatre Review "Kontrapunkt" in Szczecin and the Theatre Schools Festival in Łódź. He lectured at the Postgraduate Directing Studio at the State Higher School of Theatre in Wrocław.

In September 2006, he became the director of the Wrocław Polish Theatre, a position he held for ten years. During his management, the premieres of such plays as The Danton Case and A Piece on Mother and Fatherland by Jan Klata, Smycz by Natalia Korczakowska, Hamlet by Monika Pęcikiewicz, Tęczowa Trybuna 2012 and Courtney Love by Monika Strzępka, Dziady by Michał Zadara and Wycinka Holzfällen by Krystian Lupa were prepared. He also led debates as part of the "Magiel teatralny" [Theatrical Magel], organized as part of the "Czynne poniedziałki" (Active Mondays) series of cultural events. He held the position of director of the Polish Theatre in Wrocław until 2016.

In September 2015, he was registered as the leader of the electoral list of the Nowoczesna party of Ryszard Petru in the parliamentary elections in the Wrocław district. He won the mandate of a member of the Sejm of the 8th term with a result of 24,525 votes. In the Sejm, he became the vice-chairman of the Culture and Media Committee. In January 2018, together with Joanna Scheuring-Wielgus and Joanna Schmidt, he temporarily suspended his membership in the Nowoczesna parliamentary club when ten party members did not take part in the vote on referring the citizens' bill liberalizing abortion regulations to the Sejm committee. All three restored their full membership in the club on 2 February. He ran unsuccessfully in the 2019 European Parliament elections. In the national elections of the same year, he successfully ran for re-election as a member of the Sejm on behalf of the Civic Coalition, receiving 13,814 votes. In 2023, he was not elected to the next term of the Sejm. On 26 June 2024, he took up the mandate of a Member of the 10th term of office, replacing Bogdan Zdrojewski elected to the European Parliament.
