= Opinion polling for the 2019 Polish parliamentary election =

In the run up to the 2019 Polish parliamentary election, various organisations carry out opinion polling to gauge voting intention in Poland. Results of such polls are displayed in this article.

The date range for these opinion polls are from the previous parliamentary election, held on 25 October 2015, to the election day of 13 October 2019.

== Graphical summary ==
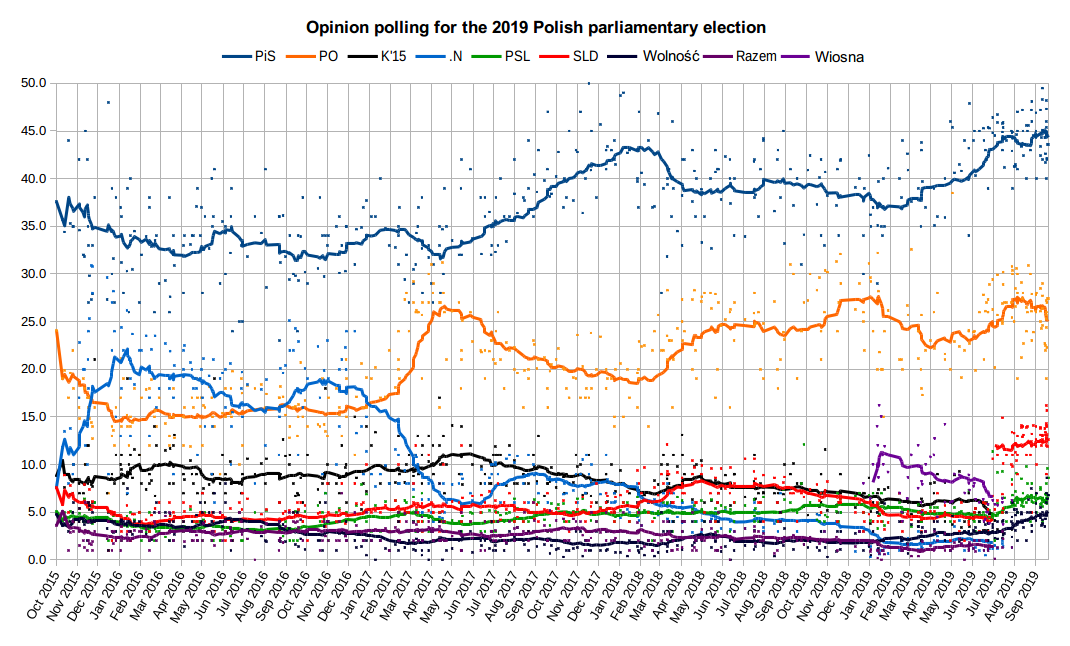

== Poll results ==
Poll results are listed in the tables below in reverse chronological order, showing the most recent first, and using the date the survey's fieldwork was done, as opposed to the date of publication. If such date is unknown, the date of publication is given instead. The highest percentage figure in each polling survey is displayed in bold, and the background shaded in the leading party's colour. In the instance that there is a tie, then no figure is shaded. The lead column on the right shows the percentage-point difference between the two parties with the highest figures. When a specific poll does not show a data figure for a party, the party's cell corresponding to that poll is shown empty.

=== 2019 ===
==== Electoral alliances ====
Exit poll

Polling Firm/Link	Fieldwork Period	Sample Size	United Right	Civic Coalition	The Left	Polish Coalition	Confederation	Independents & Local Gov. Activists	Others / Don't know	Lead
Results	13 Oct 2019		43.59	27.40	12.56	8.55	6.81	0.78	0.31	16.19
IPSOS	13 Oct 2019		43.6	27.4	11.9	9.6	6.4	-	1.1	16.2
IBRiS / RMF	11 Oct 2019	1,100	42.0	22.3	14.0	5.9	4.7	-	11.1	19.7
IBSP	10-11 Oct 2019	1,002	42.1	27.0	15.7	6.3	8.6	-	0.3	15.1
Indicator / TVP	9-10 Oct 2019	1,000	44.9	25.7	12.7	6.9	4.7	-	5.1	19.2
Estymator / "Do Rzeczy"	9-10 Oct 2019	1,007	48.2	25.3	14.1	6.8	4.9	-	0.7	22.9
Pollster / SE.pl	9-10 Oct 2019	1,059	45.4	27.2	14.3	7.0	4.7	-	1.4	18.2
Kantar Public / TVN	9-10 Oct 2019	1,503	40	26	12	7	7	0	8	14
Social Changes / wpolityce.pl	4-10 Oct 2019	1,010	47.3	24.4	16.2	6.1	6.0	-	0.0	22.9
CBOS	3-10 Oct 2019	1,013	46	19	9	8	6	-	12	27
IBRiS / ZET	9 Oct 2019	1,100	42.6	22.5	13.1	6.9	4.3	-	10.6	20.1
IBRiS / "Rz"	8-9 Oct 2019	1,000	41.7	22.0	13.4	6.0	4.3	-	12.6	19.7
IBRiS / Onet	8 Oct 2019	1,100	44.3	22.7	13.8	6.2	3.5	-	9.5	21.6
IBRiS / RMF	4-5 Oct 2019	1,100	45.1	24.6	12.6	5.6	3.8	-	8.3	20.5
Kantar Public / "GW"	1-5 Oct 2019	1,005	42	29	13	4	5	1	6	13
Estymator / "Do Rzeczy"	3-4 Oct 2019	1,015	49.5	26.4	13.1	6.4	3.7	-	0.9	23.1
Dobra Opinia / PPG	30 Sep-4 Oct 2019	8,000	48.3	27.7	12.4	6.5	4.2	-	0.9	20.6
IBRiS / Onet	2-3 Oct 2019	1,100	44.3	24.3	12.0	5.9	3.6	-	9.9	20.0
IBRiS / ZET	2 Oct 2019	1,100	42.4	25.0	13.1	5.8	4.4	-	9.3	17.4
Pollster / SE.pl	1-2 Oct 2019	1,088	43.4	28.5	13.9	7.6	4.8	-	1.8	14.9
Social Changes / wpolityce.pl	27 Sep-2 Oct 2019	1,003	47.2	26.1	13.8	7.4	5.5	-	0.0	21.1
ewybory.eu	4-27 Sep 2019		46.12	27.97	13.46	5.75	5.54	0.78	0.38 (Note: German Minority Electoral Committee – 0.16%, Effective – 0.14%, Right Wing of the Republic – 0.05%, Action of Disappointed Retirees and Pensioners – 0.03%)	18.15
Kantar Public / TVN	25-26 Sep 2019	1,005	40	28	10	5	7	-	10	12
Pollster / SE.pl	24-25 Sep 2019	1,101	45	26	14	7	5	-	3	19
Indicator / TVP	23-25 Sep 2019	1,000	44.3	26.1	11.9	6.1	4.1	-	7.5	18.2
Social Changes / wpolityce.pl	20-25 Sep 2019	1,025	46.9	27.8	12.6	6.8	5.9	-	0.0	19.1
IBRiS / RMF	20-21 Sep 2019	1,100	44.5	23.9	14.1	6.0	4.4	-	7.1	20.6
Estymator / "Do Rzeczy"	17-19 Sep 2019	1,022	48.1	27.9	13.2	6.1	3.6	-	1.1	20.2
CBOS	12-19 Sep 2019	990	46	23	5	8	3	-	15	23
Social Changes / wpolityce.pl	13-18 Sep 2019	1,001	47.2	26.1	12.4	6.8	7.5	-	0.0	21.1
Kantar Public / "GW"	13-17 Sep 2019	1,000	43	30	11	4	5	-	7	13
IBSP	12-14 Sep 2019	1,011	45.6	30.9	12.3	4.2	6.3	-	0.7	14.7
Pollster / SE.pl	12-13 Sep 2019	1,059	45	26	14	8	5	-	2	19
Kantar Public	6-11 Sep 2019	975	40	24	11	6	2	-	17	16
Social Changes / wpolityce.pl	6-11 Sep 2019	1,022	45.6	26.5	13.9	9.8	4.2	-	0.0	19.1
IBRiS / "Rz"	6-7 Sep 2019	-	42.4	22.7	13.1	5.6	3.4	0.6	12.2	19.7
Pollster / SE.pl	4-6 Sep 2019	1,094	45	28	14	7	4	-	2	17
Estymator / "Do Rzeczy"	4-5 Sep 2019	1,012	47.2	27.4	12.9	6.0	3.9	1.6	1.0	19.8
Social Changes / wpolityce.pl	30 Aug-4 Sep 2019	1,044	43.5	29.1	13.9	8.5	5.0	-	0.0	14.4
IBRiS	24 Aug-4 Sep 2019	8,000	43.4	21.2	14.1	5.7	4.8	-	10.8	22.2
Dobra Opinia / PPG	23-29 Aug 2019	8,000	45	30	11	6	4	2.5	1.5 (Note: Includes: 1% – Piotr Liroy-Marzec, 0.5% – German Minority.)	15
IPSOS / OKO	26-29 Aug 2019	1,006	41	28	13	5	5	2	6	13
CBOS	22-29 Aug 2019	1,029	47	19	9	6	2	3	14	28
Social Changes / wpolityce.pl	23-28 Aug 2019	1,007	44.6	30.6	10.4	9.1	5.3	-	0.0	14.0
IBRiS / Onet	26 Aug 2019	1,100	41.5	26.6	12.2	7.2	4.7	-	7.8	14.9
Indicator / TVP	24-26 Aug 2019	-	41.3	28.5	11.3	5.7	3.1	-	10.1	12.8
IBRiS / RMF	23-24 Aug 2019	1,100	41.3	25.0	13.3	5.8	5.3	-	9.3	16.3
Kantar Public / TVN	22 Aug 2019	1,012	39	30	11	6	6	1	7	9
Estymator / "Do Rzeczy"	21-22 Aug 2019	1,046	44.9	30.4	9.8	6.8	3.8	2.3	2.0	14.5
Social Changes / wpolityce.pl	16-21 Aug 2019	1,030	42.9	30.8	13.4	8.4	4.5	-	0.0	12.1
Ariadna / WP	16-20 Aug 2019	1,036	45	27	10	6	4	-	8 (Note: Includes: 1% – Federation for the Republic.)	18
Kantar Public / TVN	13 Aug 2019	1,003	44	27	11	4	5	1	9	17
IBRiS / "Rz"	9-10 Aug 2019	1,100	41.2	27.0	11.6	6.5	2.8	1.8	9.0	14.2
Estymator / "Do Rzeczy"	6-8 Aug 2019	1,020	45.9	30.2	10.1	5.3	4.1	3.3	1.1	15.7
Social Changes / wpolityce.pl	2-7 Aug 2019	1,026	44.9	26.9	14.9	9.3	4.0	-	0.0	18.0
Social Changes / wpolityce.pl	26-31 Jul 2019	1,012	45.9	29.9	11.0	9.2	4.0	-	0.0	16.0
Social Changes / wpolityce.pl	19-24 Jul 2019	1,064	44.8	29.4	10.6	11.4	3.7	-	0.1	15.4
Parliamentary Election	25 Oct 2015	-	37.58	31.69 (Note: Includes: 24.09% – PO, 7.60% – Modern.)	11.17 (Note: Includes: 7.55% – United Left, 3.62% – Razem.)	13.94 (Note: Includes: 8.81% – Kukiz'15, 5.13% – PSL.)	4.85 (Note: Includes: 4.76% – KORWiN, 0.09% – Committee of Grzegorz Braun "God Bless You!".)	0.10 (Note: JOW Bezpartyjni)	0.67	5.89

==== Parties ====
Polling Firm/Link	Fieldwork Period	Sample Size	Law and Justice	Civic Platform	.Nowoczesna	Democratic Left Alliance	Polish People's Party	Kukiz'15	KORWiN	Razem	Spring	Others / Don't know	Lead
Social Changes	30 Aug-4 Sep 2019	1,044	45.4	25.2	1.1	7.0	6.5	3.0	2.8	1.2	6.1	1.7 (Note: Includes: 0.9% – National Movement, 0.8% – Federation for the Republic.)	20.2
Social Changes	23-28 Aug 2019	1,007	46.3	25.0	2.1	8.9	3.8	2.8	2.6	1.2	5.8	1.5 (Note: Includes: 0.8% – Federation for the Republic, 0.7% – National Movement.)	21.3
Social Changes	16-21 Aug 2019	1,030	44.8	25.4	1.3	7.9	6.1	3.2	2.4	1.3	6.2	1.4 (Note: Includes: 0.7% – Federation for the Republic, 0.7% – National Movement.)	19.4
Estymator	6-8 Aug 2019	1,020	45.4	28.9	1.4	5.4	5.1	2.8	2.6	2.2	3.7	2.5 (Note: Includes: 0.8% – National Movement, 0.7% – The Greens.)	16.5
Pollster	6-7 Aug 2019	1,063	43	25	2	5	5	5	4	3	6	2 (Note: Includes: 1% – The Greens, 1% – National Movement.)	18
Social Changes	2-7 Aug 2019	1,026	45.8	24.8	1.7	6.9	6.5	3.0	2.3	1.3	6.4	1.3 (Note: Includes: 0.5% – Federation for the Republic, 0.3% – National Movement.)	21.0
Social Changes	26-31 Jul 2019	1,012	46.7	25.7	1.2	6.2	5.9	3.2	2.2	1.3	5.7	1.9 (Note: Includes: 0.9% – Federation for the Republic, 0.9% – National Movement.)	21.0
IBRiS / RMF	26-27 Jul 2019	1,100	44.5	20.2	1.5	5.3	2.0	4.1	2.3	0.1	5.8	14.2 (Note: Includes: 1.6% – The Greens, 0.5% – National Movement.)	24.3
Social Changes	19-24 Jul 2019	1,064	46.4	26.3	1.2	6.7	4.3	3.0	3.4	1.4	6.2	1.2 (Note: Includes: 0.7% – Federation for the Republic, 0.5% – National Movement.)	20.1
Estymator	18-19 Jul 2019	1,009	45.3	28.9	1.2	4.5	5.2	4.8	2.9	1.5	3.8	1.9 (Note: Includes: 1.1% – National Movement, 0.4% – The Greens.)	16.4
Social Changes	12-17 Jul 2019	1,004	45.4	27.3	1.0	5.3	5.8	3.1	3.8	1.2	5.8	1.3 (Note: Includes: 0.6% – National Movement, 0.6% – Federation for the Republic.)	18.1
Kantar Public	12-17 Jul 2019	974	39	26	3	3	2	4	2	1	5	15	13
Kantar Public / TVN	12-15 Jul 2019	1,002	42	27		2	3	6	3	2	5	10 (Note: Includes: 1% – National Movement.)	15
IBRiS / "Rz"	12-13 Jul 2019	1,100	43.0	26.1	0.5	5.9	4.4	3.1	3.7	1.4	4.2	7.7 (Note: Includes: 1.0% – The Greens, 0.4% – National Movement.)	16.9
CBOS	4-11 Jul 2019	1,120	44	21	1	3	6	4	3	1	4	13	23
Social Changes	5-10 Jul 2019	1,022	45.3	27.8	-	6.0	5.0	3.1	-	-	6.3	6.5	17.5
Kantar Public / PO	3-4 Jul 2019	1,000	45	26	1	3	4	5	4	2	6	4 (Note: Includes: 2% – National Movement, 2% – The Greens.)	19
IBRiS / RMF	28-29 Jun 2019	1,100	40.3	19.9	1.3	5.4	3.0	5.4	3.4	0.9	6.3	14.1 (Note: Includes: 1.1% – National Movement, 1.0% – The Greens.)	20.4
Pollster	26-27 Jun 2019	1,049	45	24	2	5	4	5	3	2	8	2 (Note: Includes: 1% – The Greens, 1% – National Movement, 0% – Now!.)	21
Social Changes	21-26 Jun 2019	1,044	44.0	23.9	1.2	4.3	4.2	4.5	3.1	1.2	7.7	5.9 (Note: Includes: 1.5% – Federation for the Republic], 0.9% – National Movement.)	20.1
Estymator	19-20 Jun 2019	1,006	47.9	22.7	1.6	4.5	4.3	3.5	1.6	1.8	7.3	4.8 (Note: Includes: 2.7% – Nonpartisan, 1.3% – National Movement, 0.4% – The Greens, 0.3% – German Minority, 0.1% – Federation for the Republic.)	25.2
Kantar Public	14-19 Jun 2019	967	34	24	3	4	4	7	3	1	8	12	10
Social Changes	14-19 Jun 2019	1,004	43.2	24.1	2.8	3.7	7.3	4.9	1.5	1.2	8.9	2.4 (Note: Includes: 1.3% – Federation for the Republic, 1.1% – National Movement.)	19.1
CBOS	6-13 Jun 2019	1,115	44	22	1	2	3	4	3	0	7	14 (Note: Includes: 1% – National Movement, 1% – The Greens.)	22
IBRiS / "Rz"	7-8 Jun 2019	1,100	40.8	19.1	1.6	6.0	5.1	3.4	2.1	1.7	8.8	11.4 (Note: Includes: 2.2% – National Movement, 0.3% – The Greens.)	21.7
Social Changes	31 May-5 Jun 2019	1,034	41.5	22.4	4.1	3.0	5.0	9.3	1.9	2.2	8.9	1.7 (Note: Includes: 1.0% – National Movement, 0.7% – Federation for the Republic.)	19.1
Social Changes	24–29 May 2019	1,040	40.6	22.9	3.5	4.0	5.5	8.9	2.8	1.8	9.0	1.0 (Note: Includes: 0.7% – Federation for the Republic, 0.3% – National Movement.)	17.7
European Parliament Elections	26 May 2019	-	45.38	38.47				3.69	4.55 (Note: The coalition includes National Movement (Confederation KORWiN Braun Liroy Nationalists).)	1.24	6.06	0.61	6.91
CBOS	16–23 May 2019	1,138	46	20	1	2	4	6	1	1	6	13 (Note: Includes: 1% – National Movement.)	26
Social Changes	10–15 May 2019	1,102	35.9	21.6	-	5.7	4.5	8.1	2.8	2.8	14.2	4.4 (Note: Includes: 0.5% – Federation for the Republic, 0.1% – National Movement.)	14.3
Kantar Public	10–15 May 2019	967	40	21	2	5	5	4	2	1	6	14 (Note: Includes: 1% – National Movement, 1% – Now!, 1% – The Greens.)	19
PAS-P	1–4 May 2019	1,054	36.0	28.0	2.5	7.0	5.5	9.0	4.0	2.0	4.5	1.5	8.0
Social Changes	26-30 Apr 2019	1,050	35.1	22.2	-	5.1	5.5	8.1	3.2	3.0	12.7	5.1 (Note: Includes: 1.0% – Federation for the Republic, 0.9% – National Movement.)	12.9
Pollster	26-29 Apr 2019	1,031	39	26	2	4	4	7	4	1	11	2 (Note: Includes: 1% – Now!, 1% – The Greens.)	13
Social Changes	19-24 Apr 2019	1,050	39.1	23.0	-	5.1	5.5	8.0	2.6	1.5	10.8	4.4 (Note: Includes: 1.2% – National Movement, 0.8% – Federation for the Republic.)	16.1
Social Changes	12-17 Apr 2019	1,111	37	22	-	5	5	9	3	3	10	6 (Note: Includes: 1% – National Movement, 1% – Federation for the Republic.)	15
IBRiS / Onet	12 Apr 2019	1,100	39.7	17.3	1.2	5.2	4.7	6.1	3.4	1.9	7.9	12.6 (Note: Includes: 0.9% – National Movement.)	22.4
Estymator	10-11 Apr 2019	1,016	43.8	25.7	1.4	4.2	5.0	6.4	2.9	1.1	8.2	1.3 (Note: Includes: 0.5% – National Movement, 0.2% – Now!.)	18.1
CBOS	4-11 Apr 2019	1,125	43	18	2	3	4	4	2	1	5	18 (Note: Includes: 1% – National Movement.)	25
Kantar Public	5-10 Apr 2019	987	35	20	4	5	4	4	2	1	6	19 (Note: Includes: 1% – National Movement, 1% – Now!, 1% – The Greens.)	15
IBRiS / "Rz"	5-6 Apr 2019	1,100	39.0	21.1	1.1	5.0	5.8	3.5	3.5	0.4	7.5	13.1 (Note: Includes: 0.6% – The Greens, 0.4% – National Movement, 0.4% – Now!.)	17.9
Pollster	4-6 Apr 2019	1,094	39	24	3	4	5	6	4	1	12	2 (Note: Includes: 1% – Now!, 1% – The Greens.)	15
IBSP / ZET	25-27 Mar 2019	1,006	37.64	32.61	1.71	4.19	3.51	4.82	3.66	0.42	10.98	0.46	5.03
Indicator / TVP	20-22 Mar 2019	1,000	40.9	25.7	2.3	5.1	5.2	6.0	0.7	1.6	8.6	3.9 (Note: Includes: 0.5% – The Greens.)	15.2
Estymator	20-21 Mar 2019	1,005	42.6	26.7	2.1	4.8	5.3	6.3	1.7	1.3	6.4	2.8 (Note: Includes: 1.3% – National Movement, 0.4% – Now!.)	15.9
CBOS	7-14 Mar 2019	1,046	44	20	2	3	4	5	1	1	4	16 (Note: Includes: 1% – The Greens.)	24
Kantar Public	8-13 Mar 2019	981	38	21	2	4	5	4	2	1	5	18	17
IBRiS / "Rz"	9-10 Mar 2019	1,100	40	21	1	7	6	7	4	-	7	7 (Note: Includes: 1% – Now!.)	19
Estymator	20-21 Feb 2019	1,013	41.1	26.2	0.7	3.9	5.6	7.6	1.4	1.4	9.2	2.9 (Note: Includes: 1.2% – National Movement, 0.1% – Now!.)	14.9
IPSOS	14-16 Feb 2019	1,004	35.02	23.99	1.33	3.19	3.59	7.40	5.94	0.64	11.88	7.02 (Note: Includes: 0.38% – Now!.)	11.03
CBOS	7-14 Feb 2019	1,019	40	15	2	2	5	5	2	1	10	18 (Note: Includes: 1% – National Movement, 0% – Now!, 0% – The Greens.)	25
Kantar Public	8-13 Feb 2019	973	34	20	2	5	4	6	1	1	11	16	14
Ariadna	8-11 Feb 2019	1,063	35	20	1	4	7	6	2	0	15	10 (Note: Includes: 1% – National Movement, 0% – Now!.)	15
IBRiS / "Rz"	7-8 Feb 2019	1,100	37.1	21.8	0.6	5.2	4.8	4.7	-	0.7	16.2	8.9 (Note: Includes: 0.5% – National Movement, 0.3% – The Greens.)	15.3
Estymator / "DoRzeczy"	5-7 Feb 2019	1,011	39.7	28.2	0.9	4.6	5.9	7.4	1.2	1.0	8.6	2.5 (Note: Includes: 1.3% – National Movement, 0.3% – Now!.)	11.5
IBSP / ZET	31 Jan-6 Feb 2019	1,000	35.05	32.2	1.14	3.99	3.27	5.76	1.55	0.15	11.98	4.91	2.85
Millward Brown	4-5 Feb 2019	1,004	29	20		6	5	7	5	1	14	13 (Note: Includes: 0% – National Movement, 0% – Now!.)	9
**"Wiosna", party of Robert Biedroń, is officially founded**
Pollster	30 Jan 2019	-	37	24	4	4	7	6	3	2	10	3 (Note: Includes: 2% – The Greens, 1% – Now!.)	13
IBRiS / "Rz"	26-27 Jan 2019	1,100	35.0	29.2	1.4	5.7	6.5	5.1	0.5	1.1	-	15.5 (Note: Includes: 1.1% – National Movement, 0.5% – Now!, 0.3% – The Greens, 1.6% – others.)	5.8
IBRiS / Onet	25-26 Jan 2019	1,100	36.2	29.6	0.3	6.1	4.1	3.8	2.0	0.9	6.4	10.6 (Note: Includes: 0.9% – Now!, 0.3% – The Greens.)	6.6
Estymator / "DoRzeczy"	23-24 Jan 2019	1,002	42.4	31.1	1.4	4.8	6.8	8.6	1.4	1.6	-	1.9 (Note: Includes: 0.4% – Now!, 1.5% – others.)	11.3
CBOS	10-17 Jan 2019	986	39	22	2	4	6	7	2	2	-	16	17
Kantar Public	11-16 Jan 2019	987	34	26	3	5	5	7	1	2	-	17	8
Millward Brown / "GW"	15-16 Jan 2019	-	30	25		3	5	5	-	2	8	22 (Note: Includes: 0% – Now!.)	5
Pollster	10-11 Jan 2019	1,097	40	29	3	6	7	7	3	3	-	2 (Note: Includes: 1% – Now!, 1% – The Greens.)	11
IBRiS / "Rz"	4 Jan 2019	1,100	39.1	26.3	0.9	5.0	6.7	5.5	2.8	1.4	-	12.3 (Note: Includes: 0.5% – Now!.)	12.8

=== 2018 ===
Polling Firm/Link	Last Date of Polling	Law and Justice	Civic Platform	.Nowoczesna	Democratic Left Alliance	Polish People's Party	Kukiz'15	KORWiN	Razem	Others / Don't know	Lead
Pollster	December 14, 2018	42	29	5	6	5	7	3	2	1	13
Estymator	December 13, 2018	41.9	32.1		6.3	6.4	9.0	1.1	1.8	1.4	9.8
Kantar Public	December 11, 2018	34	27		6	4	6	2	2	19	7
CBOS	December 9, 2018	41	24	2	4	7	5	3	1	13 (Note: Includes: 1% – The Greens, 1% – National Movement.)	17
IBRiS / "Rz"	December 8, 2018	37.2	31.3	4.0	6.7	5.1	5.7	0.9	2.4	6.7	5.9
IBRiS / Onet	November 24, 2018	38.2	30.2	3.8	8.2	4.5	5.2	0.3	2.1	7.5 (Note: Includes: 1.0% – Congress of the New Right, 0.3% – Now!, 0.0% – The Greens.)	8.0
Estymator	November 21, 2018	40.7	30.4		7.3	4.7	11.6	1.3	1.9	2.1	10.3
Millward Brown	November 20, 2018	33	26	3	7	4	7	2	3	15 (Note: Includes: 1% – National Movement, 0% – Now!.)	7
Kantar Public	November 15, 2018	34	24		7	5	9	2	2	17	10
CBOS	November 15, 2018	42	21	2	5	7	6	3	2	12	21
IBRiS / "Rz"	November 13, 2018	40.1	29.6	4.7	6.2	4.0	5.6	1.0	1.7	7.1 (Note: Includes: 0.4% – Congress of the New Right.)	10.5
IBRiS / "Rz"	November 9, 2018	37.3	28.3	4.8	7.9	4.2	4.8	1.3	2.0	9.4	9.0
Estymator	October 30, 2018	42.4	30.0		7.4	6.0	7.3	1.9	2.4	2.6	12.4
IBRiS	October 27, 2018	40.9	27.2	4.0	7.0	5.7	4.7	1.3	2.0	7.2	13.7
Local Election	October 21, 2018	34.13	26.97		6.62	12.07	5.63	1.59	1.57	11.42	7.16
Kantar Public	October 17, 2018	31	24		7	8	8	2	2	18	7
CBOS	October 11, 2018	40	19	3	4	5	8	2	2	17	21
IBRiS / "Rz"	October 6, 2018	37.2	30.0		7.0	5.2	10.1	1.1	2.6	6.8	7.2
Pollster	October 1, 2018	41	31		7	6	9	-	-	6	10
IBRiS / Onet	September 23, 2018	33.2	23.1	2.2	8.7	6.3	10.0	3.3	2.4	10.9 (Note: Includes: 6.7% – party of Robert Biedroń, 1.0% – Congress of the New Right.)	10.1
Estymator	September 21, 2018	45.0	23.9	4.1	8.1	7.4	6.9	1.5	1.9	1.2	21.1
Millward Brown	September 17, 2018	38	21	7	5	4	4	5	4	12	17
CBOS	September 13, 2018	43	18	3	4	4	7	2	2	17	25
Kantar Public	September 12, 2018	42	20	4	6	4	6	2	1	15	22
IBRiS / "Rz"	September 8, 2018	36.6	27.1	3.8	8.6	5.0	7.0	0.4	0.7	10.8	9.5
Estymator	August 23, 2018	44.2	24.8	3.4	8.9	6.6	7.1	1.5	2.8	0.7	19.4
CBOS	August 23, 2018	44	19	3	4	5	7	2	2	14	25
IPSOS / OKO	August 19, 2018	41	20	4	6	6	8	4	2	9 (Note: Includes: 5% – party of Robert Biedroń.)	21
Kantar Public	August 16, 2018	36	26	5	6	4	7	2	3	11	10
IBRiS / "Rz"	August 11, 2018	38.3	24.8	4.1	8.5	5.4	6.4	1.4	1.7	9.4	13.5
Pollster	August 10, 2018	38	28	6	8	4	11	2	3	0	10
CBM Indicator	August 10, 2018	42.0	24.6	5.2	10.6	4.6	6.3	3.1	3.5	0.1	17.4
Estymator	August 9, 2018	41.8	25.9	4.2	9.3	6.3	8.2	1.1	2.2	1.0	15.9
IBRiS	July 27, 2018	33.9	25.2	3.3	10.6	5.7	6.6	1.5	3.3	9.9	8.7
Pollster	July 12, 2018	40	27	5	8	6	9	2	3	0	13
Kantar Public	July 11, 2018	34	23	3	6	4	9	1	2	18	11
IBRiS / "Rz"	July 6, 2018	37.4	26.3	3.2	9.7	5.3	5.7	0.0	2.3	10.1 (Note: Includes: 0.0% – Congress of the New Right.)	11.1
Pollster / TVP	July 5, 2018	42	26	5	8	5	8	-	-	6	16
CBOS	July 5, 2018	40	16	5	7	3	8	2	0	19	24
Estymator	June 28, 2018	42.3	25.2	5.2	7.5	5.5	8.9	1.4	2.6	1.4	17.1
IBRiS / Onet	June 22, 2018	37.8	24.6	3.3	9.6	5.7	7.5	0.9	1.3	9.3	13.2
Pollster	June 18, 2018	41	27	4	7	5	7	4	5	0	14
Kantar Public	June 17, 2018	41	20	4	6	3	6	1	1	18	21
Estymator	June 14, 2018	40.7	27.9	4.2	8.6	5.4	8.3	1.9	2.9	0.1	12.8
CBOS	June 14, 2018	43	17	5	4	4	8	2	1	16	26
IBRiS / "Rz"	June 8, 2018	32.7	26.4	4.3	9.6	6.3	6.2	1.3	3.3	9.9	6.3
Pollster / TVP	June 7, 2018	40	28	4	7	5	8	4	4	0	12
Millward Brown	May 29, 2018	36	28	5	5	4	6	4	2	10	8
IBRiS / Onet	May 25, 2018	33.3	27.6	4.1	9.9	5.3	5.2	2.0	3.2	9.4	5.7
Estymator	May 24, 2018	38.9	27.1	2.9	9.0	6.2	10.4	2.3	2.1	1.1	11.8
CBOS	May 17, 2018	40	19	4	6	5	10	2	1	13	21
Kantar Public	May 16, 2018	36	22	4	6	4	5	2	2	19	14
Estymator	May 14, 2018	40.8	28.3	2.3	9.7	5.7	9.8	1.8	1.3	0.3	12.5
IBRiS / "Rz"	May 11, 2018	37.6	27.3	2.9	10.4	5.3	6.3	1.5	1.0	7.7	10.3
Pollster / TVP	May 11, 2018	43	20	6	9	5	8	4	5	0	23
Pollster	April 29, 2018	42	24	5	7	5	9	4	4	0	18
Pollster	April 27, 2018	42	23	6	7	4	11	3	4	0	19
Estymator	April 26, 2018	38.2	27.3	3.9	8.6	6.2	13.1	1.1	1.3	0.3	10.9
Millward Brown	April 26, 2018	33	25	6	8	5	5	4	3	11 (Note: Includes: 0% – National Movement.)	8
IBRiS / Onet	April 19, 2018	34.5	24.3	4.5	9.2	6.6	9.8	1.5	1.1	8.5 (Note: Includes: 1.1% – Congress of the New Right.)	10.2
IPSOS / OKO	April 13, 2018	39	21	7	6	4	11	4	2	6	18
CBOS	April 12, 2018	46	16	4	6	3	5	2	1	17	30
Kantar Public	April 11, 2018	36	23	5	7	3	6	3	1	16	13
Pollster / TVP	April 7, 2018	41	23	7	9	5	8	4	3	0	18
Estymator	April 5, 2018	39.4	28.3	4.3	9.3	6.0	8.9	1.4	2.1	0.3	11.1
Pollster	April 5, 2018	40	21	8	9	5	10	3	4	0	19
IBRiS / "Rz"	April 4, 2018	31.8	23.5	5.1	12.1	5.9	8.5	0.9	2.1	10.1	8.3
Pollster / TVP	March 30, 2018	39	22	7	8	6	11	3	4	0	17
Millward Brown	March 27, 2018	28	22	6	9	5	10	5	2	13	6
Estymator	March 22, 2018	46.8	25.7	4.7	6.8	5.1	7.9	0.8	1.7	0.7	21.1
IBRiS / Onet	March 17, 2018	37.1	24.0	6.3	7.6	4.4	8.3	0.4	2.0	9.9	13.1
Kantar Public	March 14, 2018	37	22	5	4	2	6	1	1	20	15
CBOS	March 8, 2018	44	14	6	5	5	6	2	2	16	30
IBRiS / "Rz"	March 2, 2018	39.4	22.5	5.0	9.7	5.2	6.8	0.5	1.4	9.5	16.9
IBRiS	February 26, 2018	40.6	22.4	3.6	7.0	6.1	6.7	1.2	3.6	9.1	18.2
Estymator	February 22, 2018	50.2	22.9	4.1	5.9	5.2	7.3	0.8	3.0	0.6	27.3
Pollster	February 22, 2018	47	19	6	8	5	7	3	5	0	28
Kantar Public	February 21, 2018	37	20	6	5	5	7	1	2	17	17
IBRiS / Onet	February 20, 2018	39.7	19.6	4.5	9.4	6.6	5.5	1.4	3.9	9.3 (Note: Includes: 0.6% – Congress of the New Right.)	20.1
Millward Brown	February 20, 2018	40	16	8	3	5	6	3	3	16	24
CBOS	February 8, 2018	43	17	5	4	4	7	2	1	15	26
IBRiS / "Rz"	February 5, 2018	42.7	20.0	5.3	7.2	6.0	5.7	0.4	2.9	9.4	22.7
Pollster	January 30, 2018	49	15	8	6	6	8	3	5	0	34
Estymator	January 26, 2018	48.7	20.6	4.4	6.8	5.2	9.4	0.8	3.1	1.0	28.1
IBRiS / Onet	January 19, 2018	41.5	20.0	6.1	6.6	4.5	7.2	0.8	2.3	10.8	21.5
Kantar Public	January 17, 2018	42	14	7	5	4	7	2	2	16	28
CBOS	January 17, 2018	44	15	6	4	4	5	2	3	15	29
IPSOS / OKO	January 13, 2018	43	19	6	5	3	10	3	2	9	24
IBRiS / "Rz"	January 7, 2018	43.4	19.0	8.4	6.7	5.4	6.1	1.1	3.0	6.9	24.4
IBRiS / PS	January 5, 2018	41	20	7	7	5	6	1	2	11 (Note: Includes: 3% – Free and Solidary, 0% – National Movement.)	21
Pollster	January 5, 2018	43	18	11	6	5	9	3	5	0	25

=== 2017 ===
Polling Firm/Link	Last Date of Polling	Law and Justice	Civic Platform	.Nowoczesna	Democratic Left Alliance	Polish People's Party	Kukiz'15	KORWiN	Razem	Others / Don't know	Lead
Estymator	December 28, 2017	**45.7**	23.4	6.9	5.4	5.5	8.3	1.0	2.9	0.9	22.3
Millward Brown	December 22, 2017	**38**	20	8	8	4	6	3	4	9	18
Pollster	December 15, 2017	**45**	18	10	6	5	8	3	5	0	27
IBRiS / Onet	December 14, 2017	**40.9**	23.8	8.3	5.6	4.1	6.7	1.0	2.3	7.3 (Note: Includes: 0.3% – Congress of the New Right.)	17.1
Kantar Public / "Fakt"	December 11, 2017	**50**	17	9	5	3	11	1	2	2	33
CBOS	December 7, 2017	**41**	18	11	3	3	7	2	2	13	23
Kantar Public	December 6, 2017	**40**	17	7	4	5	7	2	1	17	23
IBRiS / "Rz"	December 2, 2017	**36.4**	20.3	10.5	6.6	6.4	6.8	0.4	2.6	10.0 (Note: Includes: 0.4% – Congress of the New Right, 0.0% – Right Wing of the Republic.)	16.1
Pollster	November 29, 2017	**47**	17	9	5	5	10	3	4	0	30
Estymator	November 24, 2017	**42.8**	23.6	6.0	5.3	6.4	9.8	1.3	3.4	1.4	19.2
Pollster	November 22, 2017	**43**	19	9	6	5	11	3	4	0	24
IBRiS / Onet	November 18, 2017	**37.7**	19.1	7.3	5.0	5.1	8.1	1.2	4.3	12.2 (Note: Includes: 0.6% – Congress of the New Right, 0.0% – Right Wing of the Republic.)	18.6
CBOS	November 12, 2017	**45**	17	5	3	4	8	1	2	15	28
Kantar Public	November 8, 2017	**38**	18	7	4	5	9	1	2	16	20
Kantar Public / TVP (Note: Includes undecided voters.)	November 5, 2017	**40**	20	8	5	4	7	2	2	12	20
IBRiS / "Rz"	November 4, 2017	**37.0**	20.1	6.9	6.2	5.9	8.7	0.3	4.3	10.6 (Note: Includes: 1.5% – Congress of the New Right, 0.0% – Right Wing of the Republic.)	16.9
Estymator	October 27, 2017	**42.8**	22.2	8.4	5.4	5.8	9.1	1.2	3.2	1.9	20.6
IBRiS	October 24, 2017	**40.2**	21.0	8.2	5.0	5.4	7.6	1.1	4.1	7.4	19.2
IBRiS / ZET (Note: The poll includes an alternative scenario: Coalition of PO, .N and PSL – 36.8%, PiS – 35.1%, Kukiz'15 – 11.9%, Liberty – 5.0%, SLD – 2.2%, Razem – 1.6%, others – 7.4%.)	October 17, 2017	**38.4**	20.5	8.4	5.1	5.9	9.7	1.5	3.0	7.5	17.9
IBRiS / "SE"	October 15, 2017	**38.1**	19.8	8.7	5.0	3.6	8.2	0.7	5.2	10.7 (Note: Includes: 1.7% – Congress of the New Right.)	18.3
CBOS	October 12, 2017	**47**	16	6	2	3	8	2	2	14	31
Kantar Public	October 11, 2017	**41**	18	5	7	5	8	2	2	12	23
IBRiS / "Rz"	October 7, 2017	**39.8**	21.2	8.9	5.3	4.2	6.7	1.6	3.6	8.7	18.6
Kantar Public / "Fakt"	September 28, 2017	**43**	21	7	4	6	13	3	3	0	22
IBRiS / Onet	September 26, 2017	**38.6**	20.1	8.0	5.8	5.8	8.2	1.4	2.4	9.7 (Note: Includes: 0.5% – Congress of the New Right, 0.0% – Right Wing of the Republic.)	18.5
Estymator	September 22, 2017	**40.4**	22.6	8.9	4.3	6.3	9.8	2.3	4.1	1.3	17.8
Pollster	September 21, 2017	**36**	23	10	6	5	11	3	6	0	13
IPSOS / TVP	September 14, 2017	**39**	20	11	3	4	9	3	2	9	19
CBOS	September 14, 2017	**44**	19	6	3	5	8	1	2	12	25
IBRiS / "Rz"	September 8, 2017	**37.7**	19.9	8.7	6.0	5.2	8.0	1.6	5.0	7.9	17.8
Kantar Public	September 6, 2017	**38**	16	8	4	4	9	2	3	16	22
IBRiS / Onet	August 28, 2017	**36.4**	19.6	10.9	4.5	5.4	8.0	3.4	3.4	8.4 (Note: Includes: 1.6% – Congress of the New Right, 0.0% – Right Wing of the Republic.)	16.8
Estymator	August 24, 2017	**38.4**	22.3	10.2	5.2	6.4	10.4	2.4	3.3	1.4	16.1
CBOS	August 24, 2017	**42**	20	6	4	4	8	2	2	12	22
Pollster	August 17, 2017	**36**	22	11	7	5	12	3	4	0	14
IBRiS / "Rz"	August 12, 2017	**33.4**	22.8	10.6	5.3	4.9	7.8	1.7	1.8	11.7 (Note: Includes: 0.8% – Congress of the New Right, 0.0% – Right Wing of the Republic.)	10.6
Kantar Public	August 9, 2017	**36**	18	8	6	4	8	1	2	17	18
IPSOS / OKO	August 4, 2017	**40.0**	21.0	6.0	4.2	4.7	11.0	2.6	2.4	8.1	19.0
Pollster	July 31, 2017	**33**	26	9	8	5	11	4	4	0	7
IPSOS / TVP	July 28, 2017	**38**	24	10	5	3	11	1	2	6	14
IBRiS / Onet	July 27, 2017	**32.3**	20.6	10.2	6.2	5.1	11.9	1.5	3.1	9.1	11.7
Kantar Public / TVP	July 24, 2017	**35**	21	10	4	3	11	1	2	13	14
Kantar Public / "GW" (Note: The poll includes an alternative scenario: Coalition of PO, .N and PSL – 36%, PiS – 32%, Kukiz'15 – 14%, Coalition of SLD, Razem and The Greens – 7%, Liberty – 3%, others – 8%.)	July 22, 2017	**33**	23	9	3	3	10	4	3	12	10
Millward Brown	July 21, 2017	**32**	23	10	4	4	8	3	3	13	9
IBRiS / "Rz"	July 19, 2017	**36.5**	21.9	8.6	7.2	5.2	8.0	1.2	2.2	9.2	14.6
Kantar Public	July 12, 2017	**38**	19	8	4	3	9	2	1	16 (Note: Includes: 1% – Your Movement.)	19
Millward Brown	July 12, 2017	**36**	22	8	6	4	8	2	4	10	14
IBRiS / Onet	July 7, 2017	**32.1**	21.8	9.5	6.8	5.0	9.8	1.5	2.8	10.7 (Note: Includes: 0.5% – Congress of the New Right, 0.5% – Right Wing of the Republic.)	10.3
CBOS	July 6, 2017	**38**	22	5	5	3	8	2	1	16	16
IBRiS / "Rz"	June 24, 2017	**33.7**	22.9	6.2	6.7	4.9	10.0	0.8	2.3	12.5 (Note: Includes: 1.2% – Congress of the New Right.)	10.8
IPSOS / OKO	June 21, 2017	**41**	26	7	4	5	12	3	4	0	15
IBRiS / Onet	June 9, 2017	**33.3**	25.1	8.5	6.5	4.6	7.9	2.4	2.6	9.1	8.2
Pollster	June 8, 2017	**32**	22	9	12	4	14	-	5	2	10
CBOS	June 8, 2017	**42**	21	4	4	3	9	1	1	15	21
Kantar Public	June 7, 2017	**39**	18	5	5	5	11	3	1	13 (Note: Includes: 2% – Your Movement.)	21
Millward Brown	June 4, 2017	**32**	27	8	6	4	9	2	3	9	5
IBRiS / "Rz"	May 25, 2017	**33.5**	26.1	7.9	6.1	4.1	14.1	1.2	2.5	4.5	7.4
Kantar Public	May 17, 2017	**35**	21	6	3	3	10	1	2	19	14
CBOS	May 14, 2017	**39**	26	5	4	4	7	2	2	11 (Note: Includes: 1% – Free and Solidary.)	13
Pollster	May 12, 2017	**30**	28	8	10	4	13	3	4	0	2
IBRiS / Onet	May 11, 2017	**34.7**	31.2	4.4	5.1	4.1	10.1	0.0	2.1	8.3 (Note: Includes: 0.0% – Congress of the New Right, 0.0% – Right Wing of the Republic.)	3.5
Kantar Public / "GW"	May 8, 2017	**28**	27	5	4	2	10	2	2	20	1
IPSOS / TVP	May 7, 2017	**35**	27	5	3	4	12	4	2	8 (Note: Includes: 0% – Your Movement.)	8
PAS-P	May 7, 2017	**33.0**	16.0	4.5	5.0	5.0	17.0	8.0	3.5	8.0	16.0
Kantar Public / TVP	April 28, 2017	**31**	29	4	5	2	9	2	2	16	2
Kantar Public / "GW"	April 27, 2017	27	**28**	4	5	3	12	3	3	15	1
Millward Brown	April 25, 2017	29	**31**	5	6	3	10	3	3	10	2
IBRiS / "Rz"	April 21, 2017	**31.7**	30.0	6.3	5.2	4.4	10.3	0.0	3.4	8.7	1.7
Pollster	April 21, 2017	**33**	27	8	11	3	13	1	4	0	6
Kantar Public / "GW"	April 12, 2017	**28**	27	5	3	4	12	2	2	17	1
Kantar Public	April 11, 2017	**38**	19	5	4	3	11	1	2	17	19
IBRiS / ZET	April 11, 2017	**32.7**	25.7	6.3	5.9	7.0	8.0	0.5	4.5	9.4	7.0
CBOS	April 6, 2017	**37**	26	5	4	4	9	2	2	11	11
Kantar Public / wSieci	April 5, 2017	**35**	26	10	5	4	13	3	3	1	9
Dobra Opinia	April 3, 2017	**34.3**	26.2	10.8	5.5	5.2	9.8	2.2	3.7	2.3 (Note: Includes: 1.6% – National Movement, 0.7% – German Minority.)	8.1
Pollster	April 2, 2017	**31**	26	11	12	3	11	1	5	0	5
IBRiS / Onet	March 30, 2017	**30.5**	29.2	7.4	6.0	6.6	8.8	1.1	3.9	6.7 (Note: Includes: 0.4% – Right Wing of the Republic.)	1.3
Millward Brown	March 30, 2017	**29**	27	8	8	4	10	4	2	8	2
Kantar Public / "GW"	March 23, 2017	**27**	24	8	5	3	11	2	3	17	3
IPSOS / OKO	March 19, 2017	**32**	28	8	5	6	10	3	4	4	4
IBRiS / "Rz"	March 17, 2017	**29.4**	27.3	9.4	5.1	6.2	8.1	1.3	4.9	8.3	2.1
CBOS	March 9, 2017	**37**	19	8	4	5	9	2	2	14	18
Kantar Public	March 8, 2017	**35**	21	8	4	4	8	1	2	17	14
Millward Brown	March 8, 2017	**34**	24	11	3	4	5	4	3	12	10
Pollster	March 8, 2017	**31**	20	14	10	5	13	2	5	0	11
IBRiS / Onet	March 3, 2017	**32.8**	18.1	11.6	6.2	6.2	8.1	1.6	3.4	12.0	14.7
Kantar Public	February 22, 2017	**33**	22	8	3	3	8	1	1	21	11
IBRiS / "Rz"	February 17, 2017	**34.8**	17.1	9.9	5.7	6.1	9.8	1.2	3.3	12.1 (Note: Includes: 1.0% – Congress of the New Right.)	17.7
CBOS	February 9, 2017	**40**	17	9	5	3	8	2	2	14	23
IBRiS / Onet	February 2, 2017	**36.0**	20.2	13.4	5.2	5.7	7.7	0.0	3.2	8.6 (Note: Includes: 0.0% – Congress of the New Right, 0.8% – Right Wing of the Republic.)	15.8
Kantar Public	January 27, 2017	**36**	19	9	5	3	12	2	2	12	17
IBRiS / "Rz"	January 20, 2017	**37.7**	19.1	11.4	5.2	6.9	7.2	0.5	3.0	9.0	18.6
Pollster	January 20, 2017	**34**	16	15	10	4	14	2	5	0	18
CBOS	January 15, 2017	**37**	16	9	6	5	8	2	2	15	21
IBRiS / ZET	January 13, 2017	**34.9**	20.6	14.0	5.8	7.9	5.3	1.4	2.9	7.2 (Note: Includes: 0.7% – Congress of the New Right, 0.7% – Right Wing of the Republic.)	14.3
IBRiS / Onet	January 5, 2017	**34.7**	17.1	13.3	5.9	5.7	8.6	1.3	3.6	9.8 (Note: Includes: 0.8% – Congress of the New Right, 0.5% – Right Wing of the Republic.)	17.6
Pollster	January 3, 2017	**31**	11	24	8	4	15	2	5	0	7

=== 2016 ===
Polling Firm/Link	Last Date of Polling	Law and Justice	Civic Platform	.Nowoczesna	Polish People's Party	Kukiz'15	United Left		KORWiN	Razem	Others / Don't know	Lead
Polling Firm/Link	Last Date of Polling	Law and Justice	Civic Platform	.Nowoczesna	Polish People's Party	Kukiz'15	Democratic Left Alliance	Your Movement	KORWiN	Razem	Others / Don't know	Lead
Millward Brown	December 22, 2016	**35**	15	24	5	6	3	-	3	2	7	11
Kantar Public / CBOS	December 22, 2016	**35**	19	18	3	9	3	-	2	2	9	16
IPSOS / OKO	December 21, 2016	**35**	21	20	3	10	4	-	4	2	1	14
IBRiS	December 20, 2016	**30.3**	17.7	22.3	4.9	9.7	3.8	-	2.5	2.5	6.3	8.0
Pollster	December 15, 2016	**33**	13	21	3	12	8	-	3	7	0	12
CBOS	December 11, 2016	**36**	16	14	3	7	4	-	3	2	15	20
IBRiS / Onet	December 11, 2016	**30.1**	15.2	20.0	5.4	8.6	5.2	-	2.8	4.0	8.7 (Note: Includes: 0.9% – Congress of the New Right, 0.0% – Right Wing of the Republic.)	10.1
Kantar Public	December 7, 2016	**35**	18	10	5	8	4	1	1	2	16	17
Millward Brown / RMF	November 25, 2016	**34**	17	19	2	8	5	-	4	2	9	15
Pollster	November 24, 2016	**33**	13	23	3	10	8	-	4	4	2	10
PAS-P	November 21, 2016	**34.0**	13.5	7.0	7.0	18.0	3.5	-	6.0	2.5	8.5	16.0
IBRiS / "Rz"	November 19, 2016	**29.7**	14.2	19.9	4.3	9.1	4.5	-	3.5	4.0	10.8 (Note: Includes: 0.6% – Congress of the New Right, 0.6% – Right Wing of the Republic.)	9.8
Kantar Public	November 17, 2016	**34**	19	9	5	8	4	1	1	2	17	15
CBOS	November 13, 2016	**38**	14	17	4	6	5	-	2	1	13	21
IBRiS / Onet	November 10, 2016	**30.6**	14.2	22.4	5.7	7.4	4.9	-	2.0	3.1	9.7	8.2
TNS Poland / "GW"	October 26, 2016	**29**	14	19	3	11	2	1	3	3	15	10
IBRiS / "Rz"	October 22, 2016	**30.2**	16.7	20.1	5.1	8.9	5.7	-	1.1	2.9	9.3	10.1
CBOS	October 19, 2016	**38**	15	16	4	6	4	-	3	2	12	22
Dobra Opinia	October 16, 2016	**33.9**	20.7	17.5	4.2	8.6	6.0	-	2.2	4.2	2.7 (Note: Includes: 1.5% – National Movement, 1.1% – German Minority.)	13.2
IBRiS / Onet	October 13, 2016	**29.3**	16.3	22.9	5.2	6.8	5.3	-	1.4	3.4	9.4 (Note: Includes: 0.9% – Congress of the New Right, 0.5% – Right Wing of the Republic.)	6.4
TNS Poland	October 12, 2016	**34**	15	11	3	9	3	0	3	3	19	19
Pollster	October 11, 2016	**24**	13	18	2	7	6	-	5	4	21	6
IBRiS / ZET	October 8, 2016	**29.8**	16.1	24.3	5.1	6.7	4.7	-	1.6	3.9	7.8	5.5
Millward Brown	October 5, 2016	**30**	16	22	2	8	5	-	5	4	8	8
IPSOS / OKO	September 30, 2016	**34**	14	22	2	11	3	-	3	3	8	12
IBRiS / "Rz"	September 29, 2016	**29.4**	12.8	25.1	3.2	10.0	5.2	-	3.3	5.0	6.0	4.3
IBRiS / "Rz"	September 24, 2016	**31.8**	15.2	20.4	4.0	10.9	5.1	-	1.9	3.5	7.2	11.4
TNS Poland / "Fakt"	September 20, 2016	**36.1**	17.1	19.6	2.5	12.6	4.9	-	3.7	1.8	1.7	16.5
IBRiS / Onet	September 16, 2016	**31.2**	18.2	20.1	3.5	9.0	4.1	-	1.9	2.3	9.7	11.1
Pollster	September 15, 2016	**23**	9	15	2	9	6	-	4	4	28	8
CBOS	September 15, 2016	**36**	17	16	3	6	3	-	2	2	15	19
TNS Poland	September 14, 2016	**36**	17	11	3	9	3	1	2	1	17	19
IBRiS / "Rz"	August 27, 2016	**28.6**	17.4	18.9	5.2	10.6	5.3	-	1.9	3.8	8.3	9.7
CBOS	August 25, 2016	**41**	16	12	3	8	3	-	2	3	12	25
IBRiS / Onet	August 19, 2016	**34.3**	18.4	17.9	3.2	10.1	4.8	-	2.5	3.5	5.3	15.9
TNS Poland	August 10, 2016	**36**	18	8	5	9	3	1	3	0	17	18
IBRiS / "Rz"	July 30, 2016	**31.8**	18.3	18.4	4.1	10.6	6.4	-	3.2	2.2	5.0	13.4
Pollster	July 23, 2016	**25**	12	15	2	9	7	-	4	3	23	10
IBRiS / Onet	July 22, 2016	**33.2**	17.5	19.7	3.1	7.9	5.3	-	3.2	2.7	7.4	13.5
Millward Brown	July 21, 2016	**33**	19	18	2	7	4	-	3	4	10	14
Pollster	July 18, 2016	**25**	10	16	4	8	6	-	5	5	21	9
Pracownia Mediowa	July 8, 2016	**24.0**	19.8	15.5	3.0	4.0	2.0	-	2.0	3.0	26.7	4.2
CBOS	July 7, 2016	**39**	15	14	3	8	3	-	4	3	11	24
TNS Poland	July 6, 2016	**36**	18	10	4	8	4	0	1	2	17	18
IBRiS / "Rz"	July 5, 2016	**32.2**	15.4	20.6	2.5	10.3	5.4	-	3.3	3.4	6.9	11.6
IPSOS / OKO (Note: The poll includes an alternative scenario: Coalition of PO, .N, PSL and SLD – 38%, PiS – 32%, Kukiz'15 – 12%, KORWiN – 6%, Razem – 4%, others – 8%.)	June 28, 2016	**35**	15	20	3	7	2	-	8	3	7	15
TNS Poland / "GW"	June 28, 2016	**30**	18	16	3	9	3	1	6	4	10	12
IBRiS / Onet	June 24, 2016	**35.5**	15.4	19.6	3.2	11.0	4.7	-	3.5	2.0	5.1	15.9
Pollster	June 20, 2016	**29**	9	19	2	8	5	-	4	5	19	10
PAS-P	June 12, 2016	**41**	14	6	4.5	19	3	-	7	1.5	4	22
Millward Brown	June 10, 2016	**36**	14	21	2	7	4	-	5	3	8	15
CBOS	June 9, 2016	**35**	15	14	2	9	5	-	3	3	14	20
TNS Poland	June 8, 2016	**40**	17	9	2	9	3	1	4	2	13	23
IBRiS / "Rz"	June 4, 2016	**32.7**	18.2	19.3	4.6	7.9	3.7	-	5.0	2.9	5.7	13.4
CBOS	May 29, 2016	**36**	16	14	5	6	4	-	3	3	13	20
IBRiS / Onet	May 27, 2016	**32.6**	16.2	21.1	4.2	7.5	4.9	-	3.9	3.8	5.8	11.5
Pollster (Note: The poll includes an alternative scenario: Coalition of .N, PSL, SLD – 28%, PiS – 27%, PO – 11%, Kukiz'15 – 6%, KORWiN – 5%, Razem – 3%, others – 20%.)	May 25, 2016	**28**	12	17	2	7	7	-	5	2	20	11
Millward Brown	May 24, 2016	**37**	17	20	4	5	5	-	4	3	5	17
Millward Brown / "GW"	May 22, 2016	**34**	14	19	4	4	5	-	6	3	11 (Note: Includes: 2% – National Movement.)	15
TNS Poland	May 18, 2016	**39**	17	11	4	7	4	0	2	2	14	22
Dobra Opinia	May 17, 2016	**37.1**	19.0	18.0	3.9	9.0	4.0	0.0	4.7	2.6	1.7 (Note: Includes: 1.7% – National Movement.)	18.1
CBOS	May 12, 2016	**34**	16	18	4	8	4	0	3	2	11	16
TNS Poland / "GW" (Note: The poll includes an alternative scenario: Coalition of PO, .N, PSL, SLD and TR – 38%, PiS – 33%, Kukiz'15 – 13%, KORWiN – 6%, Razem – 3%, others – 7%.)	May 10, 2016	**34**	17	20	2	9	3	0	4	2	9	14
IBRiS / "Rz"	May 8, 2016	**33.1**	11.9	20.7	5.3	10.4	5.6	0.0	3.0	3.2	6.8	12.4
IBRiS / Onet	April 29, 2016	**34.0**	16.0	22.5	3.5	8.4	5.1	0.0	1.4	1.9	7.2	11.5
Pollster	April 28, 2016	**28**	12	20	3	9	6	0	4	3	15	8
Millward Brown	April 28, 2016	**33**	15	22	3	7	4	0	4	3	9	11
IBRiS	April 14, 2016	**30.9**	12.8	20.4	4.6	13.1	4.6	0.0	2.7	3.0	7.9	10.5
TNS Poland	April 13, 2016	**34**	18	9	3	8	3	2	2	2	19	16
TNS Poland / "GW"	April 13, 2016	**32**	15	17	3	12	4	0	4	3	10	15
IBRiS / "Rz"	April 8, 2016	**27.6**	15.0	21.9	4.6	11.7	4.6	0.0	4.9	3.1	6.6	5.7
Pollster	April 7, 2016	**26**	12	19	2	10	6	0	4	5	16	7
CBOS	April 7, 2016	**38**	13	18	3	8	4	0	2	3	11	20
IBRiS / Onet	April 1, 2016	**29.3**	14.3	22.7	2.4	11.5	4.1	0.0	5.0	4.6	6.1	6.6
Millward Brown	March 23, 2016	**29**	17	18	3	10	6	0	5	5	7	11
CBOS	March 19, 2016	**34**	14	16	3	12	4	0	6	2	9	18
IBRiS	March 17, 2016	**33.5**	15.7	23.5	3.3	6.7	5.4	0.0	2.5	3.7	5.7	10.0
TNS Poland / "GW"	March 16, 2016	**26**	15	19	2	14	3	1	5	4	11	7
IBRiS / "Rz"	March 12, 2016	**32.9**	18.9	22.1	3.6	8.3	4.7	0.0	2.1	2.3	5.1	10.8
TNS Poland	March 9, 2016	**38**	12	13	5	9	3	0	2	1	17	25
CBOS	March 9, 2016	**37**	18	17	3	8	3	0	2	2	10	19
IBRiS / Onet	March 4, 2016	**33.9**	17.9	23.5	2.9	7.4	4.2	0.0	2.7	3.2	4.3	10.4
Millward Brown	February 26, 2016	**32**	17	22	2	8	4	0	3	3	9	10
Pollster	February 23, 2016	**27**	11	22	5	11	5	0	4	3	12	5
Dobra Opinia	February 16, 2016	**34.5**	18.0	18.4	4.2	11.6	4.8	0.0	4.0	3.1	1.5 (Note: Includes: 0.8% – National Movement, 0.7% – German Minority.)	16.1
IBRiS / "Rz"	February 13, 2016	**30.5**	14.4	23.7	3.6	8.6	4.8	0.0	2.7	2.2	9.5	6.8
TNS Poland	February 10, 2016	**40**	15	13	5	9	2	1	3	2	10	25
CBOS	February 10, 2016	**34**	14	19	2	11	3	0	3	2	12	15
Pollster	February 8, 2016	**26**	12	21	4	10	4	0	3	3	17	5
PAS-P	February 6, 2016	**39**	14	7	3.5	19	3		7.5	2	5	20
IBRiS / Onet	February 5, 2016	**30.3**	15.2	26.2	4.6	6.9	5.7	0.0	3.6	2.7	4.8	4.1
TNS Poland / "GW"	January 31, 2016	**28**	19	22		8			4		19	6
TNS Poland / "Fakt"	January 28, 2016	**31.2**	21.1	24.4	2.0	9.5	3.5		4.2	3.5	0.6	6.8
CBOS	January 28, 2016	**36**	14	18	2	11	3	1	4	2	9	18
TNS Poland	January 27, 2016	**37**	17	13	4	10	4		4	1	10	20
TNS Poland	January 20, 2016	**38**	16	15	3	11	2		3	2	10	22
Pollster	January 18, 2016	**27**	12	24	4	8	5		4	3	13	3
IBRiS / "Rz"	January 16, 2016	**31.6**	13.6	28.2	4.6	4.8	5.0	0	2.9	1.7	7.6	3.4
Millward Brown	January 14, 2016	**30**	14	27	2	9	5	0	4	1	8	3
CBOS	January 14, 2016	**39**	13	22	2	9	2	1	3	3	6	17
PressMix	January 9, 2016	**48**	7	9	2	5	1	0	1	4	23	36
IBRiS / Onet	January 7, 2016	27.3	16.2	**29.6**	4.5	7.0	5.4		3.3	2.2	4.5	2.3

=== 2015 ===
Polling Firm/Link	Last Date of Polling	Law and Justice	Civic Platform	.Nowoczesna	Polish People's Party	Kukiz'15	United Left		KORWiN	Razem	Others / Don't know	Lead
Polling Firm/Link	Last Date of Polling	Law and Justice	Civic Platform	.Nowoczesna	Polish People's Party	Kukiz'15	Democratic Left Alliance	Your Movement	KORWiN	Razem	Others / Don't know	Lead
PAS-P	December 20, 2015	**38**	16	6	6	21	4		4	3	2	17
IBRiS / "WP"	December 17, 2015	27.9	12.7	**30.8**	3.8	7.7	6.1		5.0	1.9	4.1	2.9
Millward Brown	December 17, 2015	**33**	14	28	4	6	4	0	4	1	6	5
IBRiS / "SE"	December 15, 2015	27.3	14.4	**30.9**	5.6	7.9	5.3		3.9	1.6	3.1	3.6
IBRiS / "Rz"	December 12, 2015	**29.8**	14.8	25.3	5.7	5.3	7.4		5.7	1.7	4.3	4.5
TNS Poland / "GW"	December 11, 2015	**27**	16	24	4	12	6			4	7	3
IPSOS / TVP	December 11, 2015	**33**	17	18	3	6	6		6	2	9	15
CBOS	December 10, 2015	**35**	15	21	3	8	3	1	3	3	8	14
TNS Poland	December 9, 2015	**42**	17	10	3	12	4		2	1	9	25
PressMix	December 6, 2015	**45**	10	12	4	10	3		3	6	7	33
IBRiS / Onet	December 5, 2015	**31.8**	18.0	20.0	6.4	6.1	7.9		3.7	1.3	4.8	11.8
Millward Brown	December 3, 2015	**32**	19	20	4	7	6		4	2	6	12
IBRiS / "Rz"	November 28, 2015	**34.6**	14.8	22.8	4.9	7.0	5.4		5.4	1.5	3.6	11.8
Estymator	November 27, 2015	**42**	16	17	4	8	4		4	3	2	25
IPSOS / TVP	November 19, 2015	**35**	18	10	4	10	4		6	3	10	17
Millward Brown	November 18, 2015	**35**	22	9	5	7	7		5	4	6	13
IBRiS / "Rz"	November 14, 2015	**35.3**	19.6	13.8	5.1	6.9	7.8		4.0	2.9	4.6	15.7
TNS Poland	November 12, 2015	**44**	17	8	4	9	5		3	1	9	27
IBRiS / Onet	November 6, 2015	**34.4**	19.9	13.5	5.0	7.6	8.9		3.8	4.2	2.7	14.5
IBRiS / "Rz"	November 3, 2015	**35.7**	19.0	11.8	4.1	10.4	5.8		3.6	5.1	4.5	16.7
Parliamentary Election	October 25, 2015	**37.58**	24.09	7.60	5.13	8.81	7.55		4.76	3.62	0.86	13.49

=== Alternative scenarios ===
Some polls gauge voting intention in case an electoral coalition is created by two or more opposition parties.

Polling Firm/Link	Last Date of Polling	Law and Justice	Civic Platform	.Nowoczesna	Polish People's Party	Democratic Left Alliance	Razem	Spring	Kukiz'15	KORWiN	Others / Don't know	Lead
Kantar Public	August 14, 2019	**38**	26		5	10			6	3	12	12
Pollster	August 7, 2019	**43**	28		5	12			5	4	3 (Note: Includes: 2% – Nonpartisan local government activists.)	15
IBRiS / RMF	July 27, 2019	**41.7**	25.0		2.8	10.2			5.3	2.6	12.4 (Note: Includes: 3.0% – Nonpartisan local government activists.)	16.7
Estymator	July 19, 2019	**47.1**	29.2		5.4	9.5			5.2	3.3	0.3	17.9
IBRiS / "Rz"	July 13, 2019	**42.7**	38.5				8.0		2.9	3.0	4.9 (Note: Includes: 0.4% – National Movement.)	4.2
IBRiS / "Rz"	July 13, 2019	**43.2**	31.3			12.3			3.0	3.0	7.2	11.9
IBRiS / "Rz"	July 13, 2019	**42.6**	33.9		5.4	w. PO	4.3		2.4	4.4	7.0	8.7
Kantar Public / PO	July 3, 2019	**40**	37 (Note: The coalition includes The Greens party.)				2	6	8	5	8 (Note: Includes: 2% – National Movement.)	3
IBRiS / "Fakt"	June 29, 2019	**38.4**	23.4		9.3	13.3			w. PSL	-	15.6	15.0
IBRiS / "Fakt"	June 29, 2019	**39.9**	26.6			14.0			7.0	-	12.5	13.3
IBRiS / RMF	June 29, 2019	**42.4**	28.5			12.1			3.8	5.2	8.2	13.9
Pollster	June 27, 2019	**45**	34				3	8	5	5	-	11
Estymator	June 20, 2019	**46.7**	30.1		5.4	w. PO	8.2		5.2	3.6	0.8	16.6
Social Changes	June 19, 2019	**45.9**	32.6				2.1	9.7	6.1	3.6	-	13.3
IBRiS / RMF	June 8, 2019	**41.5**	38.2 (Note: The coalition includes Spring party.)				2.4	w. PO	3.7	3.4	10.8	3.3
IBRiS / "Rz"	June 8, 2019	**40.8**	24.1			13.4			3.9	2.7	15.1 (Note: Includes: 1.9% – National Movement, 1.2% – The Greens.)	16.7
Social Changes	May 29, 2019	**44.1**	27.8				2.6	10.2	10.5	3.8	1.2	16.3
Pollster	April 29, 2019	**39**	36 (Note: The coalition includes Now! and The Greens parties.)				2	11	8	4	-	3
IPSOS	February 16, 2019	**33.94**	33.24				1.04	12.02	7.90	6.14	5.72 (Note: Includes: 0.19% – Now!.)	0.70
IBRiS / "Rz" (Note: The poll measures voting intention in case the Spring party is not running in the election.)	February 8, 2019	**37.6**	27.4	2.1	6.8	6.3	1.0	-	6.4	-	12.4 (Note: Includes: 0.5% – National Movement, 0.3% – Now!, 0.3% – The Greens.)	10.2
Pollster	January 10, 2019	**37**	25	3	7	5	2	9 (Note: Under the name party of Robert Biedroń)	7	3	2 (Note: Includes: 1% – Now!, 1% – True Europe Movement (party of Tadeusz Rydzyk).)	12
Pollster	December 14, 2018	**39**	27	4	5	5	2	7	7	2	2 (Note: Includes: 1% – Now!, 1% – True Europe Movement (party of Tadeusz Rydzyk).)	12
Estymator (Note: The poll includes a seat projection: PiS – 239, coalition of PO and .N – 161, Kukiz'15 – 36, PSL – 17, party of Robert Biedroń – 6, German Minority – 1.)	December 13, 2018	**42.2**	27.8		5.9	4.8	1.5	5.3	8.6	2.1	1.8 (Note: Includes: 0.6% – Now!.)	14.4
Pollster (Note: The poll includes a seat projection: Coalition of PO, .N, PSL, SLD, Razem and Teraz! – 246, PiS – 191, Kukiz'15 – 22, German Minority – 1.)	November 30, 2018	38	**50** (Note: The coalition includes Now! party.)					-	8	4	0	12
IBRiS	November 16, 2018	**39.1**	36.4 (Note: The coalition includes KOD.)		4.4	5.1	1.5	-	5.3	0.8	7.4	2.7
IBRiS	November 16, 2018	**39.2**	32.9		4.0	5.9	1.3	-	6.2	0.6	9.9 (Note: Includes: 2.9% – KOD.)	6.3
IBRiS / "Rz"	November 13, 2018	**40**	27		4	5	1	9	5	1	8 (Note: Includes: 0.7% – Congress of the New Right.)	13
IBRiS / "Rz"	November 9, 2018	**37**	27		4	7	1	6	6	1	8 (Note: Includes: 0.7% – Congress of the New Right.)	10
IBRiS / "Rz"	October 6, 2018	**35.8**	29.8		4.4	5.8	2.6	3.2	10.8	1.1	6.5	6.0
Ariadna	October 1, 2018	**38.5**	19		-	6.5	-	5.5	5.5	-	25	19.5
IBRiS / Onet	September 23, 2018	**33.2**	26.4		6.3	8.7	2.4	-	10.0	3.3	9.7	6.8
Millward Brown	September 19, 2018	**34**	22		4	7	-	8	7	5	13	12
IBRiS / "Rz"	September 8, 2018	**38**	29 (Note: The coalition includes the Polish Initiative of Barbara Nowacka.)		5	8	1	8	5	-	6	9
IBRiS / "Rz"	September 8, 2018	**37**	31		5	9	1	-	7	-	10	6
Ariadna (Note: The poll measures voting intention in case voting is made obligatory.)	September 3, 2018	**27**	**27** (Note: The coalition includes the Polish Initiative of Barbara Nowacka, committees of Robert Biedroń, The Greens party, women's and urban movements.)					-	13		33 (Note: Includes: 33% – invalid votes.)	Tie
Ariadna	September 3, 2018	**25**	19		5	10			10	4	27 (Note: Includes: 27% – invalid votes.)	6
Ariadna	September 3, 2018	**27**	14	3	4	5	1	-	8	3	35 (Note: Includes: 23% – invalid votes, 5% – new centre party, 4% – new left-wing party, 3% – new right-wing party.)	13
IBRiS	September 1, 2018	**39**	28		5	8	2	-	10	1	7	11
IBRiS	September 1, 2018	**41**	29			5	1	5	9	1	9 (Note: Includes: 1% – Congress of the New Right.)	12
IPSOS / OKO	August 19, 2018	**36**	22		5	16			11	4	7	14
IBRiS / "Fakt"	May 9, 2018	**36.9**	33.4		5.7	10.0	-	-	5.5	-	8.5	3.5
Pollster	April 29, 2018	**38**	35		5	6	3	-	8	5	0	3
IBRiS / Onet	April 19, 2018	**34.9**	29.6		6.2	8.0	-	-	11.0	-	10.3	5.3
IPSOS / OKO	April 13, 2018	**34**	27			14	2	-	12	5	6	7
Kantar Public	April 10, 2018	29	**32**		3	7	2	-	10	2	15	3
IBRiS	March 26, 2018	**35.2**	33.0		3.5	4.5	3.0	-	9.0	0	11.2	2.2
Kantar Public	March 20, 2018	**34**	27		4	4	4	-	12	2	12	7
IBRiS / "Rz"	March 2, 2018	**38.2** (Note: Excludes Alliance and United Poland.)	22.0	5.0	5.1	9.3	1.4	-	6.8	0.5	12.2 (Note: Includes: 0.8% – Alliance, 0.4% – United Poland, 0.0% – Congress of the New Right.)	16.2
IPSOS / OKO	January 13, 2018	**42**	28				11		11	3	5	14
IBRiS / ZET	October 17, 2017	35.1	**36.8**			2.2	1.6	-	11.9	5.0	7.4	1.7
Ariadna	July 31, 2017	**23.8**	16.7	5.8	2.4	3.8	4.0	-	11.7	1.9	29.9 (Note: Includes: 21.4% – invalid votes, 4.8% – new centre party, 2.3% – new right-wing party, 1.4% – new left-wing party.)	7.1
Kantar Public / "Rz"	July 25, 2017	31	**38**			5	3	-	15	3	5	7
Kantar Public / "Rz"	July 25, 2017	32	**35**		6	4	3	-	13	2	5	3
Kantar Public / "GW"	July 22, 2017	32	**36**			7 (Note: The coalition includes The Greens party.)		-	14	3	8	4
Ariadna / "DGP"	July 10, 2017	**37.2**	28.7		2.9	5.3	1.5	-	9.0	2.0	13.4	8.5
IPSOS / OKO	June 28, 2016	32	**38**				4	-	12	6	8	6
Pollster	May 25, 2016	27	11	**28**			3	-	6	5	20	1
TNS Poland / "GW"	May 10, 2016	33	**38** (Note: The coalition includes TR party.)				3	-	13	6	7	5

== Seat projections ==
Polling Firm/Link	Last Date of Polling	Law and Justice (PiS)	Civic Platform (PO)	.Nowoczesna	Democratic Left Alliance (SLD)	Razem	Spring	Polish People's Party (PSL)	Kukiz'15	KORWiN	Others	Majority
Results	October 13, 2019	235	134		49			30		11	1	5
IPSOS	October 13, 2019	239	130		43			34		13	1	9
Badania.pro (Note: Projection based on polls aggregation: 46.5% – PiS, 28.7% – KO, 13.4% – The Left, 6.2% – PSL-KP, 4.4% – Konfederacja, 0.2% – German Minority, 0.6% – others.)	October 11, 2019	247	144		55			13		0	1	17
Indicator / TVP	October 10, 2019	246	135		56			22		0	1	16
Estymator	October 10, 2019	250	132		54			23		0	1	20
Pollster / SE.pl	October 10, 2019	244	130		64			21		0	1	14
Kantar Public / "GW"	October 5, 2019	245	152		59			0		3	1	15
Estymator	October 4, 2019	256	135		49			19		0	1	26
Dobra Opinia / PPG	October 4, 2019	254	138		49			18		0	1	24
IBRiS / Onet	October 3, 2019	253	137		50			19		0	1	23
Pollster / SE.pl	October 2, 2019	234	148		51			26		0	1	4
Indicator / TVP	September 25, 2019	251	137		51			20		0	1	21
Estymator	September 19, 2019	250	140		53			16		0	1	20
Badania.pro (Note: Projection based on polls aggregation: 45.7% – PiS, 28.7% – KO, 13.3% – The Left, 6.5% – PSL-KP, 4.2% – Konfederacja, 0.2% – German Minority, 1.4% – others.)	September 19, 2019	246	146		54			13		0	1	16
Pollster	September 6, 2019	241	134		63			22		0	1	11
Estymator	September 5, 2019	249	141		53			16		0	1	19
IBRiS	September 4, 2019	259	119		66			15		0	1	29
Dobra Opinia / PGG	August 29, 2019	246	155		45			13		0	1	16
IPSOS	August 29, 2019	229	150		57			11		12	1	Hung
Kantar Public / TVN	August 22, 2019	217	163		47			16		16	1	Hung
Estymator	August 22, 2019	240	162		34			23		0	1	10
IBRiS / "Rz"	August 10, 2019	243	151		45			20		0	1	13
Estymator	August 8, 2019	267	167	0	13	0	0	12	0	0	1	37
Estymator	August 8, 2019	255	160		33			11	0	0	1	25
Estymator	July 19, 2019	275	171	0	0	0	0	13	0	0	1	45
Estymator	July 19, 2019	255	154		33			12	5	0	1	25
Kantar Public / PO	July 4, 2019	277	151	0	0	0	19	0	12	0	1	47
Kantar Public / PO	July 4, 2019	214	196			0	15		26	9	0	Hung
IBRiS / "Rz"	June 29, 2019	227	136		55			41		0	1	Hung
IBRiS / "Rz"	June 29, 2019	234	148		57			w. PO	20	0	1	4
Estymator	June 20, 2019	272	160	0	0	0	27	0	0	0	1	42
Estymator	June 20, 2019	245	168				25	13	8	0	1	15
Estymator	April 11, 2019	249	153	0	0	0	29	12	16	0	1	19
Estymator	March 21, 2019	252	154	0	0	0	19	16	18	0	1	22
Estymator	February 21, 2019	232	145	0	0	0	39	17	26	0	1	2
IPSOS	February 16, 2019	184	180			0	52		27	17	0	Hung
IPSOS	February 16, 2019	213	140	0	0	0	59	0	29	19	0	Hung
IPSOS	February 16, 2019	189	223			0	-		30	18	0	Hung
Estymator	February 7, 2019	224	157	0	0	0	31	20	27	0	1	Hung
IBRiS / "Rz"	January 27, 2019	222	183	0	18	0	-	26	10	0	1	Hung
Estymator	January 24, 2019	234	170	0	0	0	-	21	34	0	1	4
CBOS	January 18, 2019	286	136	0	0	0	-	0	37	0	0	55
Estymator	December 13, 2018	219	172		13	0	-	19	36	0	1	Hung
Estymator	November 21, 2018	226	160		26	0	-	0	47	0	1	Hung
Estymator	October 30, 2018	236	158		26	0	-	18	21	0	1	6
Estymator	September 21, 2018	254	129	0	32	0	-	24	20	0	1	24
Estymator	August 23, 2018	243	137	0	36	0	-	20	23	0	1	13
Pollster	August 10, 2018	216	153	9	37	0	-	0	45	0	0	Hung
Estymator	August 9, 2018	234	135	0	37	0	-	19	34	0	1	4
Estymator	June 28, 2018	236	133	8	26	0	-	17	39	0	1	6
Estymator	June 14, 2018	229	150	0	33	0	-	14	33	0	1	Hung
Estymator	May 24, 2018	218	142	0	35	0	-	20	44	0	1	Hung
Estymator	May 14, 2018	226	142	0	36	0	-	14	41	0	1	Hung
Estymator	April 26, 2018	209	142	0	33	0	-	19	56	0	1	Hung
Estymator	April 5, 2018	210	157	0	37	0	-	18	37	0	1	Hung
IBRiS / "Rz"	April 4, 2018	194	135	10	58	0	-	20	42	0	1	Hung
Estymator	March 22, 2018	258	139	0	22	0	-	11	29	0	1	28
Estymator	February 22, 2018	284	121	0	14	0	-	11	29	0	1	54
Estymator	January 26, 2018	277	105	0	25	0	-	11	41	0	1	47
IBRiS / PS	January 5, 2018	256	118	23	27	0	-	17	18	0	1	26
Estymator	December 28, 2017	265	121	19	8	0	-	11	35	0	1	35
IBRiS / Onet	December 14, 2017	250	137	31	14	0	-	0	27	0	1	20
Kantar Public / "Fakt"	December 11, 2017	285	88	30	8	0	-	0	48	0	1	55
Estymator	November 24, 2017	246	130	11	9	0	-	21	42	0	1	16
Estymator	October 27, 2017	248	114	28	11	0	-	18	40	0	1	18
Kantar Public / "Fakt"	September 28, 2017	221	108	35	0	0	-	30	66	0	0	Hung
IBRiS / Onet	September 26, 2017	241	111	30	16	0	-	20	41	0	1	11
Estymator	September 22, 2017	235	124	34	0	0	-	22	44	0	1	5
Estymator	August 24, 2017	221	119	42	9	0	-	23	45	0	1	Hung
IBRiS / "Rz"	June 24, 2017	204	145	22	35	0	-	8	45	0	1	Hung
IBRiS / Onet	May 11, 2017	213	186	0	11	0	-	0	49	0	1	Hung
Millward Brown	April 25, 2017	172	195	20	27	0	-	0	45	0	1	Hung
IBRiS / "Rz"	April 21, 2017	193	181	22	14	0	-	0	49	0	1	Hung
IBRiS / ZET	April 11, 2017	204	151	17	21	0	-	27	39	0	1	Hung
IBRiS / "Rz"	March 17, 2017	176	160	41	10	5	-	22	45	0	1	Hung
IBRiS / "Rz"	January 20, 2017	232	104	54	11	0	-	27	31	0	1	2
IBRiS / "Rz"	October 22, 2016	188	87	107	15	0	-	18	44	0	1	Hung
Parliamentary Election	October 25, 2015	235	138	28	0	0	-	16	42	0	1	5
