= Joanna Mihułka =

Polish manager, politician and economist

Joanna Schmidt
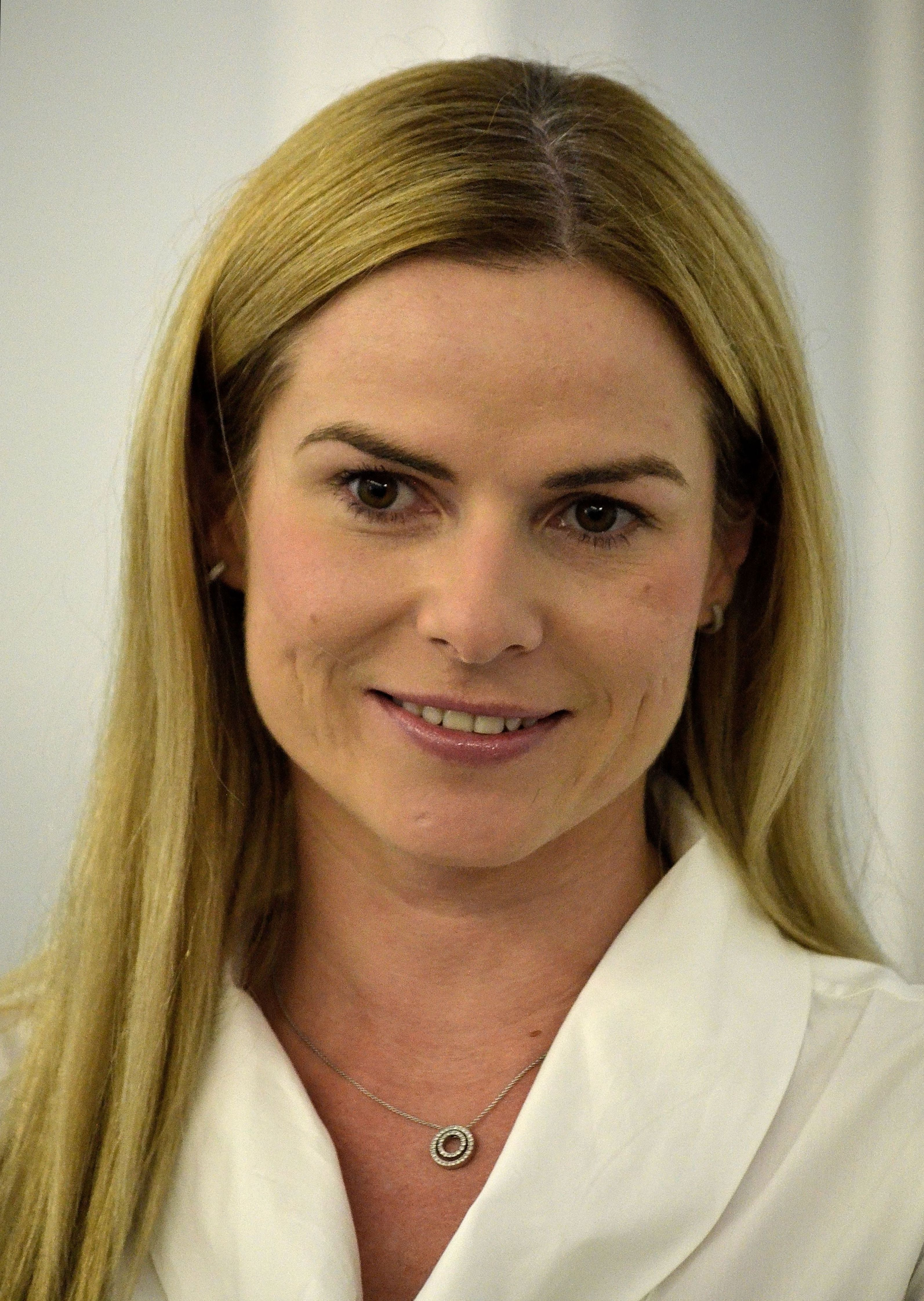
- Born: 14 September 1978 (age 47); Głogów
- Education: Poznań University of Economics
- Occupation: Politician
- Political party: Nowoczesna (2015–2018); Now! (2018–2019)

Joanna Mihułka-Petru formerly Joanna Schmidt (born 14 September 1978 in Głogów) is a Polish manager, politician and economist. She was a member of the Sejm from 2015 to 2019, representing the Modern party. Since 2024, she is the wife (formerly, the long-term domestic partner) of the parties' founder Ryszard Petru.
