= Kamila Gasiuk-Pihowicz =

Polish lawyer and politician

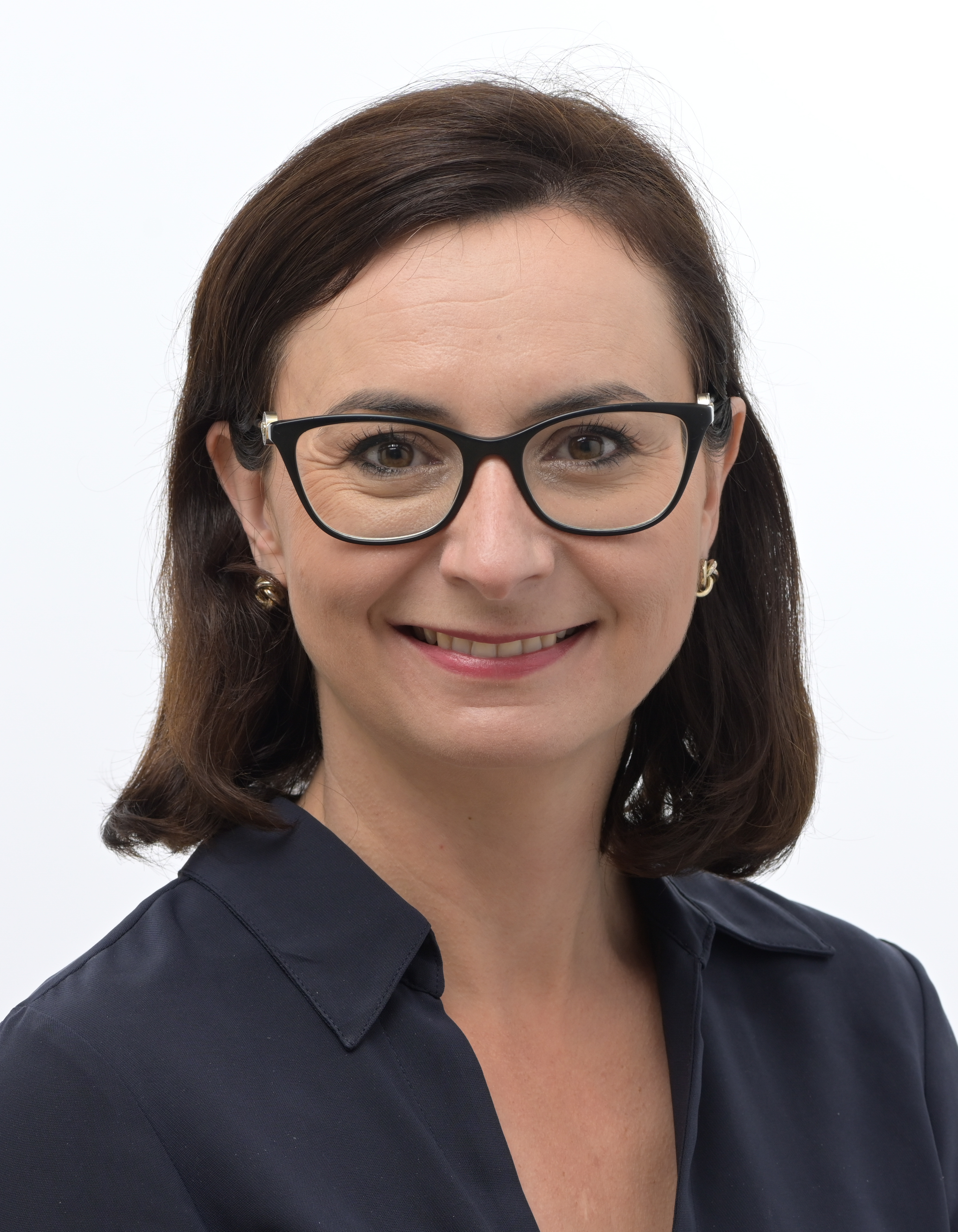

Member of the European Parliament for Warsaw
- Incumbent
- Assumed office 16 July 2024

Member of the Sejm
- In office 12 November 2015 – 10 June 2024
- Constituency: 20 – Warszawa (2015–2019); 18–Siedlce (2019–2024)

Leader of the Modern parliamentary group
- In office 9 January 2018 – 5 December 2018
- Preceded by: Katarzyna Lubnauer
- Succeeded by: Katarzyna Lubnauer

Personal details
- Born: 8 May 1983 (age 43) Warsaw, Poland
- Party: Civic Platform (since 2018); Modern (2015–2018)
- Other political affiliations: Civic Coalition (since 2018); European People's Party Group (since 2024)
- Education: Cardinal Stefan Wyszyński University in Warsaw; Warsaw School of Economics
- Profession: Lawyer, politician

Kamila Gasiuk-Pihowicz (born 8 May 1983 in Warsaw) is a Polish lawyer and politician. Since 2024 she is a member of the European Parliament.

== Career ==
In August 2014, Gasiuk-Pihowicz became the spokesperson for the political party Modern. In October 2015, she was elected to the Sejm, running from the first position on the party's election list in the Warsaw II district, receiving 19,041 votes. On 9 January 2018, she replaced Katarzyna Lubnauer as chairperson of the Modern party's parliamentary group. In December 2018, she left the Modern party and joined Civic Platform. In the 2019 parliamentary elections she was elected to the Sejm, this time running from the Siedlce district with 34,793 votes. In 2023 election she was reelected with 57,609 votes. In the same year, she was elected to the National Council of the Judiciary.

She was elected as a Member of the European Parliament in 2024.

In 2024, she was elected as Vice-Chair of the IMCO.

== Personal life ==
She was born in Warsaw.

Her husband is Michał Pihowicz, a former treasurer of the Modern party. They have two children.
