= Now! (political party) =

Polish liberal political party (e. 2018)

Now! Teraz!
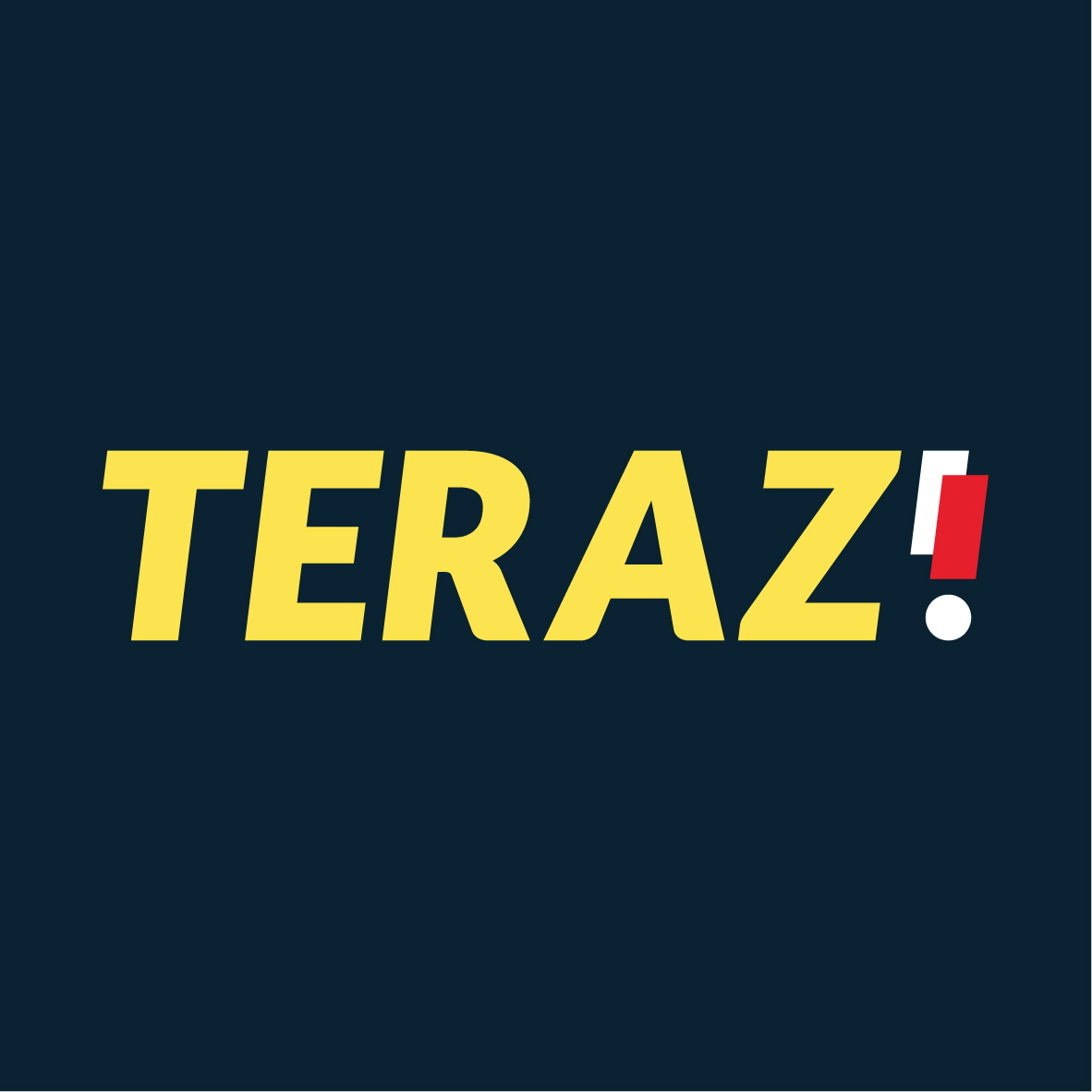
- Leader: Ryszard Petru
- Founder: Ryszard Petru; Joanna Scheuring-Wielgus
- Founded: 17 November 2018
- Dissolved: 4 July 2019
- Split from: .Modern
- Headquarters: Williama Heerleina Lindleya 16, 02–013 Warsaw
- Ideology: Economic liberalism Social liberalism Pro-Europeanism
- Political position: Centre-right
- European Parliament group: Alliance of Liberals and Democrats for Europe
- Colors: Peacoat; Yellow

Website
- wybierzteraz.pl

Now! (Polish: Teraz!) was a short-lived liberal political party in Poland. The party was founded on 17 November 2018 by the former World Bank economist Ryszard Petru and Joanna Scheuring-Wielgus as a split from the Modern party which Petru was also a founder. His partner Joanna Schmidt, the vice-president of ALDE also defected. The party joined the European Coalition on 18 February 2019. The party was dissolved on 4 July 2019.

== History ==
The party was registered on 6 November 2018 under the name Liberal-Social, which was then carried by the MP circle formed by its founders. They were the MPs who left the Nowoczesna party in May 2018: Ryszard Petru (founder of Nowoczesna and its first chairman), Joanna Scheuring-Wielgus and Joanna Schmidt (later under the name Mihułka, vice-chair of ALDE). Ryszard Petru became chairman of the new party and its treasurer Marcin Grunwald. The grouping already under the new name Now! was presented on 17 November 2018, with Joanna Mihułka as the new party treasurer. Among others, Anna Skiba, who on 16 November as head of Nowoczesna's structures in Subcarpathian Voivodeship, left the party together with almost all its activists from the region who were dissatisfied with the functioning of the Civic Coalition. On 20 November 2018, the Liberal-Socialist parliamentary circle was re-registered as the Now! circle. A few days later, about 40 people from Western Pomeranian Voivodeship, hailing from Nowoczesna, joined the party. On 9 December 2018, the party's convention was held at Centrum Praski Koneser in Warsaw, at which programme demands were presented. Speakers included former MP and deputy mayor of Warsaw Jacek Wojciechowicz and former head of the Youth Forum of the Polish Confederation of Private Employers Lewiatan and the Young Modern Forum Adam Kądziela.

On 18 February 2019, the party's board of directors announced its accession to the European Coalition, established for the European Parliament elections in the same year. In addition, the parliamentary circle Now! proposed to Nowoczesna to form a federated parliamentary club, but Nowoczesna rejected this offer. Despite the party's endorsement of the EC, it did not become an entity, with two leading activists of Now! (while remaining in the grouping) ran for the European Parliament elections from the Spring party lists - Joanna Scheuring-Wielgus from second place on the list in the Warsaw district, and Anna Skiba opened the list in the Podkarpackie district. However, neither of them won a seat. Both members of the Now! won a total of 29,570 votes, or 0.22% of the votes cast nationally (and 3.58% of all Spring candidates).

Now! did not submit its financial report for 2018, and on 30 March 2019 the party's convention passed a resolution to dissolve it. The leader and liquidator of Ryszard Petru's grouping announced his resignation from running in the next elections and his withdrawal from political activity afterwards, and on 4 July 2019 the party's statutory bodies announced the end of the party's activities. The parliamentary circle Now! functioned until the end of the VIII term of the Sejm. In the Parliamentary elections 2019, its MP Joanna Scheuring-Wielgus successfully ran for re-election as a Spring candidate from the SLD list (as part of the Left project).

== Ideology ==
The party represented a combination of socioliberal, pro-European and neoliberal views; it advocated a free-market economy and adhered to the principles of economic liberalism. Its program included proposals such as tax cuts for business, privatization of companies managed by the State Treasury, lifting the ban on Sunday trade, cuts on pensions and farmer subsidies, and introduction of euro currency in Poland. Ryszard Petru stated that the party is liberal both socially and economically, and advocated policies such as moving away from coal in favor of renewable energy and welfare cuts, including cuts in the 500 plus program.

Now! espoused fiscal conservatism, accusing other parties of "giving away money left and right". It proposed cuts in the social security system, downsizing it to reduce the social security tax for businesses by 500 PLN. Additionally, the party offered to "abolish the taxes and tributes of PiS", which included bank and solidarity taxes. It also called for cutting pensions of small farmers and miners, arguing that the state "cannot finance them over and over again".

The party argued that the 500 plus program did not work out as planned and proved to be a "demographic fiasco", and offered to reform the program to ensure that it is "only for those who need it" and only for actively working families. Additionally, the party called for reducing the PIT (Personal Income Tax) and CIT (Corporate Income Tax) rates to 16 percent. Now! also advocated for the introduction of a construction tax credit and a subsidy for renting flats, with the main goal of the program being subsidising all tenants on a monthly basis for long-term rental. The party also wanted to make Poland the Eurozone within one year time.
