= Katarzyna Lubnauer =

Polish politician and deputy (born 1969)

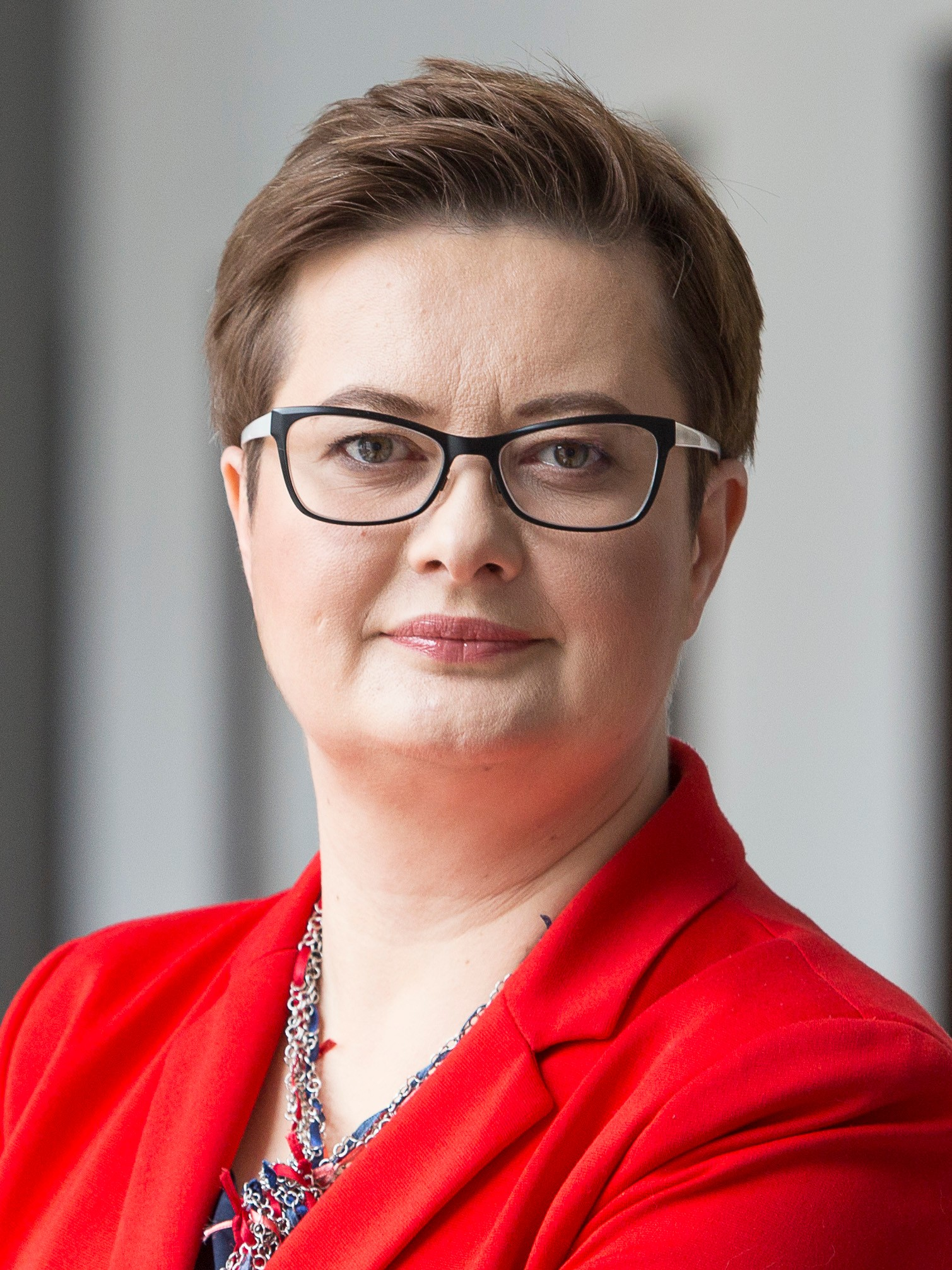
- Lubnauer in 2017

Member of the Sejm
- Incumbent
- Assumed office 12 November 2015

Leader of Modern
- In office 25 November 2017 – 24 November 2019
- Preceded by: Ryszard Petru
- Succeeded by: Adam Szłapka

Deputy Minister of National Education
- In office 14 December 2023

Member of the Łódź City Council
- In office 1998–2002

Personal details
- Born: 24 July 1969 (age 57) Łódź, Poland
- Party: Democratic Union (1993–1994); Freedom Union (1994–2005); Democratic Party, (2005–2007); Modern (since 2015)
- Other political affiliations: Left and Democrats (2006-2007); Civic Coalition (since 2018)
- Education: University of Łódź
- Profession: politician, mathematician

Katarzyna Anna Lubnauer (née Libudzisz; born 24 July 1969) is a Polish politician, feminist, mathematician and academic teacher. She is a member of the Polish Parliament and a former leader of the liberal Modern (.Nowoczesna) political party. In 2023, she was appointed State Secretary in the Ministry of National Education.

== Early life and education ==
She was born Katarzyna Libudzisz on 24 July 1969 in Łódź to mother Zdzisława, a professor of microbiology and father Jerzy, a chemist. Her family had been living in Łódź since the second half of the 19th century. She graduated from the Tadeusz Kościuszko High School No. 3 in Łódź (Polish: III Liceum Ogólnokształcące im. Tadeusza Kościuszki w Łodzi) as well as the University of Łódź. She briefly worked as a school teacher before she decided to continue her studies at the University of Łódź where she became a lecturer at the Faculty of Mathematics. She obtained her PhD degree in mathematics in 2001 after she wrote her doctoral dissertation entitled Limit Theorems in Quantum Probability. She later assumed the position of assistant professor at the Department of Probability Theory and Statistics.

== Political career ==
In 1993 she worked for the Democratic Union and in 1994, the Freedom Union where she was one of the local leaders of the party in Łódź. Between 1998 and 2002, she was a member of the Łódź city council. In 2001, she was one of the candidates for the head of Freedom Union in Łódź. She was a member of the last General Board of the Freedom Union and in 2005 she was one of the leaders of the newly reformed Democratic Party – demokraci.pl. She unsuccessfully stood for election to the Sejm in 2001 and 2005.

She published articles in the Liberté! magazine and was one of the organizers of the Festival of Science, Technology and Arts in Łódź. In 2015, together with Leszek Jażdżewski, she was one of the initiators of the Secular School campaign, which aimed at cutting state funding to religious education classes in public schools across Poland.

During the Polish parliamentary elections in 2015, as a candidate of the Modern political party, she won a seat in the Sejm running from the first position on the party's election list in the Łódź constituency. She received a total of 18 549 votes. In 2016, she was appointed deputy chairman of the party, and from January to May 2017 she was its spokesperson. In April the same year, she also assumed the position of the chairperson of the parliamentary group of the Modern party. On 25 November 2017, during the party's congress in Warsaw, she was elected the leader of the Modern party defeating in a close vote its original founder Ryszard Petru. On 9 January 2018, she was replaced by Kamila Gasiuk-Pihowicz as the chairperson of the Modern party's parliamentary group. In November 2019, she stepped down as leader of the party and was replaced by Adam Szłapka.

In 2023, following the parliamentary election, she assumed the post of State Secretary in the Ministry of National Education in the Third Cabinet of Donald Tusk.

== Personal life ==
In 1991, she married Maciej Lubnauer, a financier with whom she has a daughter named Anna. She has obtained qualifications as a sailing instructor. She has also publicly declared herself an atheist.

== Controversy ==
In July 2024, in an official position at Ministry of Education, she said in a radio interview that "in other countries, parents who leave with their kids for vacation during a school year can be detained at airports" and suggested that a similar measure could be introduced in Poland.

== See also ==
- Ryszard Petru
- Modern
- Politics of Poland
