= Ryszard Petru =

Polish politician (born 1972)

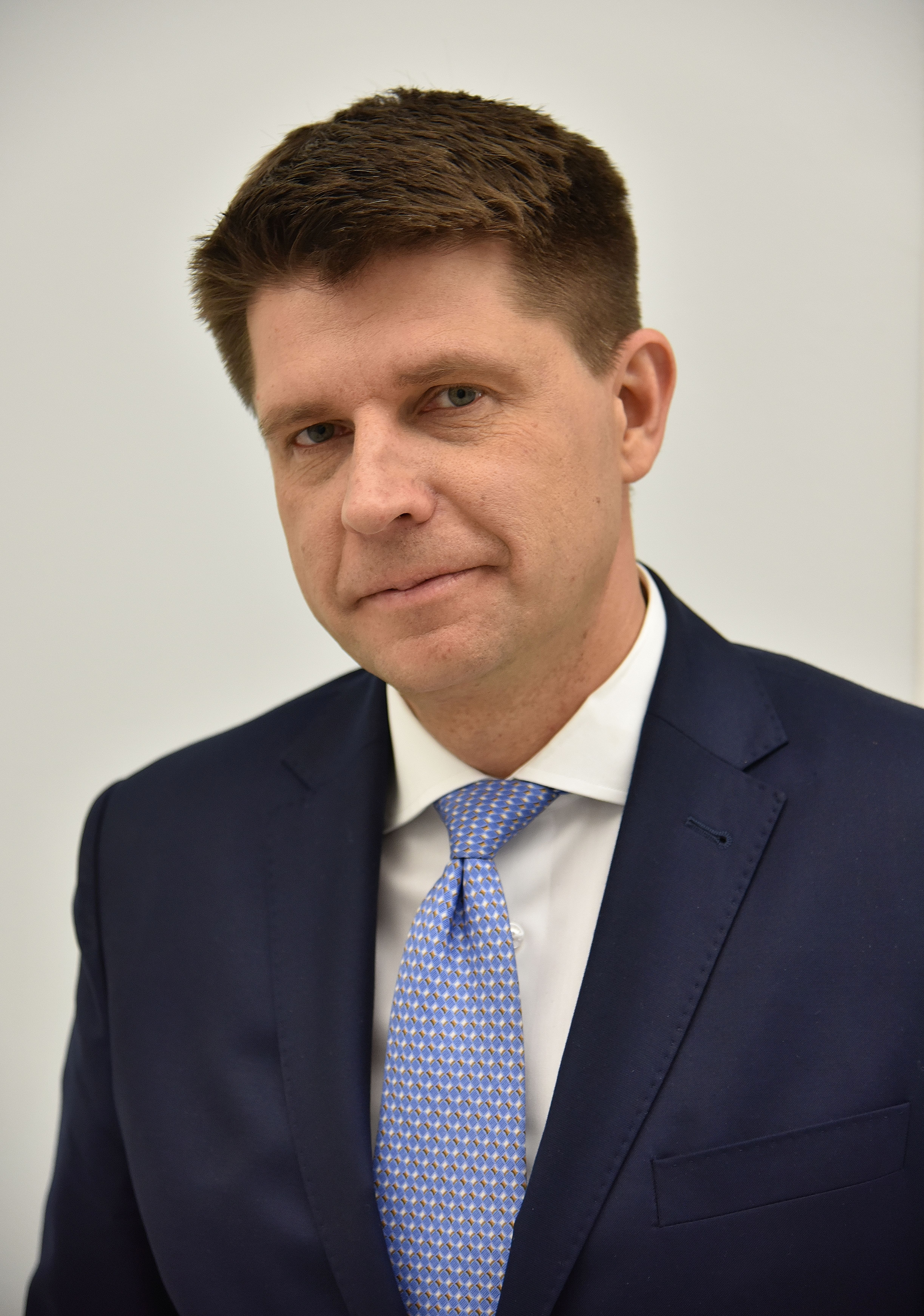

Member of the Sejm
- Incumbent
- Assumed office 13 November 2023
- In office 12 November 2015 – 11 November 2019
- Constituency: 19-Warsaw I

Leader of Modern
- In office 31 May 2015 – 25 November 2017
- Preceded by: Office established
- Succeeded by: Katarzyna Lubnauer

Personal details
- Born: 6 July 1972 (age 54) Wrocław, Poland
- Party: Centre (since 2026)
- Other political affiliations: Poland 2050 (2023–2026); Now! (2018–2019); Petru's Plan (2018) Modern (2015–2017; 2022–2023); Freedom Union (1994–2003); Democratic Union (1991–1994)
- Spouse: Małgorzata Petru (m. 1997; div. 2017)
- Domestic partner: Joanna Schmidt (2016–present)
- Children: 2
- Education: Warsaw School of Economics
- Profession: Economist
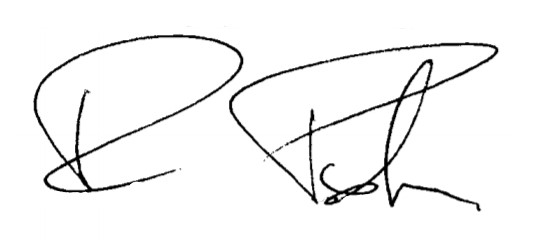
- Signature
- Website: Official website

Ryszard Jerzy Petru (born 6 July 1972) is a Polish politician. He served as an assistant to several members of parliament in the 1990s. He has worked as an economist for the World Bank, PricewaterhouseCoopers and several Polish banks. Since 2011, he has been the chairman of the Association of Polish Economists. He is the author of several books, including two children's books on economics.

In 2015, Petru founded a liberal political party .Modern (.Nowoczesna). The party received 7.6% of votes in the 2015 Polish parliamentary election. Petru was elected to the Sejm from Warsaw (19) district.

== Career ==
=== Education and early career (1990s–2001) ===
Ryszard Petru studied at the Faculty of Computer Science and Management of the Wrocław University of Technology, and graduated from the Warsaw School of Economics. During the second year of his studies at the WSE, he became an assistant of the Democratic Union MP Władysław Frasyniuk. On the recommendation of his lecturer Leszek Balcerowicz, Petru began working for the Center for Social and Economic Research. In 1995, he became Balcerowicz's assistant.

Between 1997 and 2000, when Leszek Balcerowicz was the Deputy Prime Minister and the Minister of Finance, Petru served as his advisor, working as a consultant in the office of the Government Plenipotentiary for the Pension System Reform. In 1998, he started working as a teacher at the Warsaw School of Economics. He was a member of the Freedom Union at that time, being one of their candidates in the 2001 Polish parliamentary election, earning 4646 votes in the Warsaw suburbs district.

=== Banking and corporate career (2001–2015) ===
From 2001 to 2004, Petru worked as an economist for the Polish and Hungarian affairs at the World Bank, dealing with the reform of public finances, regional policy and investment climate. Then, until 2008, he held a position of the chief economist at the Bank BPH. He then worked at the BRE Bank (later rebranded to mBank) as the director for the bank's strategy and chief economist, and as a managing director at PKO BP. Between 2011 and 2014, he was a partner at PricewaterhouseCoopers, responsible for the area of Polish small and medium-size private companies.

Since May 13, 2011 he has been the Chairman of the non-profit organization Association of Polish Economists. He also occasionally cooperated with Forum Obywatelskiego Rozwoju (Civil Development Forum), founded by Leszek Balcerowicz, as a speaker at their meetings and seminars.

In 2013, he appeared as an expert in seven episodes of a Religia.tv show Morality and Ethics in the Time of Crisis, where current events from the world of finance and economics were discussed. In the same year, he became an economic advisor to the Marshal of the Lower Silesian Voivodeship.

Between 2008 and 2013, Ryszard Petru was an informal advisor to Polish Prime Minister Donald Tusk, acting as the intermediary between Tusk and the International Monetary Fund. A leaked diplomatic cable was sent from the United States Embassy in Warsaw in March 2009 by (now former) U.S. Ambassador Victor Ashe, detailing his meeting with Petru.

From February to March 2014, Petru was the Chairman of the Supervisory Board of the Polish State Railways. In the same year, he became the Chairman of the Supervisory Board of the Solaris Bus & Coach enterprise.

He has been an author of publications on economics, including the book The End of the Free Market? The Origins of the Crisis (2014), written with journalist Łukasz Lipiński. He worked as an expert and co-author with Grzegorz Kasdepke on two children's books explaining the ins and outs of economics, published by the National Centre of Culture.

=== Political career with Modern (2015–2018) ===
In May 2015, Petru created the 'Modern PL' ('NowoczesnaPL') foundation in Rzeszów, and then the association with the same name, and declared forming a political movement around them. Among people involved in that process were: an activist and former businessman Wadim Tyszkiewicz (Mayor of Nowa Sól), and Paweł Rabiej.

In August 2015, the movement's name was changed to .Modern (.Nowoczesna). The party represents a liberal ideology. As the leader of the party, Petru severely criticized the Civic Platform government and the Law and Justice party, labelling them as untrustworthy and unreliable.

In October 2015, Modern received 7.6% of votes in the Polish parliamentary election. Running from the first position on the party's election list in Warsaw, Petru was elected to Sejm, receiving the third best result in the country (129,088 votes), behind Ewa Kopacz (230,894 votes) and Jarosław Kaczyński (202,424 votes).

=== Later political career (2018–present) ===
In 2018, Petru left Modern and he founded new political association - Petru's Plan. On 17 November 2018, he founded the short-lived party Now! along with Joanna Scheuring-Wielgus.

Petru did not contest the 2019 parliamentary election, announcing his retirement from politics. However, in 2023, Petru joined Poland 2050 and was elected to the 10th Sejm in the 2023 parliamentary election on the lists of the Third Way, containing Poland 2050 and the Polish People's Party, along with other minor parties. After the resignation of Poland 2050's leader, Szymon Hołownia, in 2025, he announced he would contest the leadership election of Poland 2050 slated for January 2026.

In addition to his role in parliament, Petru has been serving as a member of the Polish delegation to the Parliamentary Assembly of the Council of Europe since 2024. In the Assembly, he is a member of the Committee on Rules of Procedure, Immunities and Institutional Affairs (since 2025), the Committee on Political Affairs and Democracy (since 2024) and the Committee on Social Affairs, Health and Sustainable Development (since 2024). In this capacity, he authored a 2025 report on the situation in Belarus.

== Personal life ==
Since 1997, Petru has been married to his wife Małgorzata. They have two daughters.

== Controversy ==
As a teenager, Petru had lived in the Soviet Union for two years. He resided in Dubna, Moscow Oblast, where his father and mother worked for the Joint Institute for Nuclear Research (JINR, Russian: Объединённый институт ядерных исследований, ОИЯИ). The fact that the institute was controlled by the GRU (Glavnoye Razvedyvatel'noye Upravleniye, Main Intelligence Directorate), the main military foreign-intelligence service of the Soviet Union, has caused controversy in Poland decades later.
