= Wrocław Polish Theatre =

Coordinates: 51°06′04″N 17°01′35″E

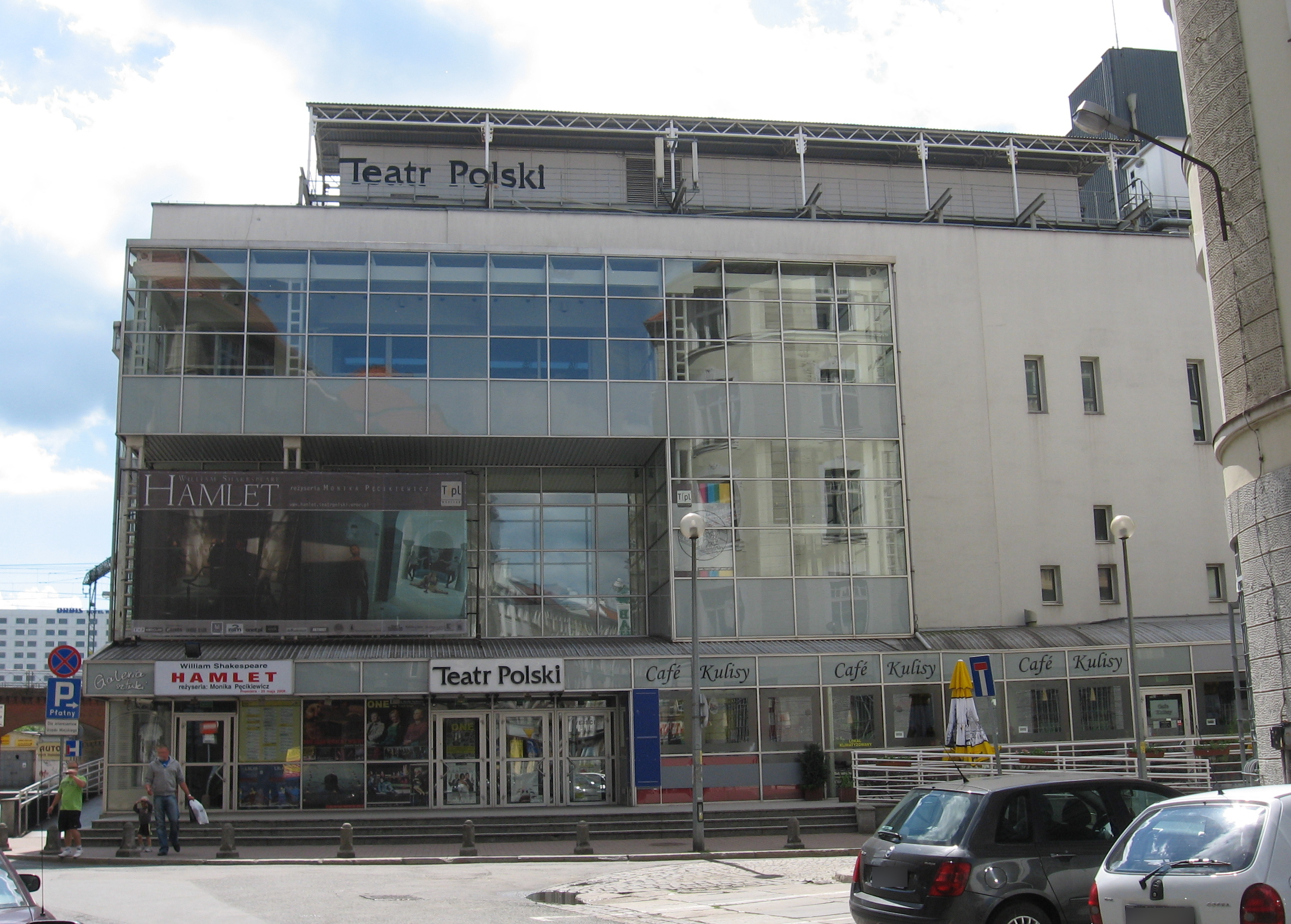
Polish Theatre in Wrocław

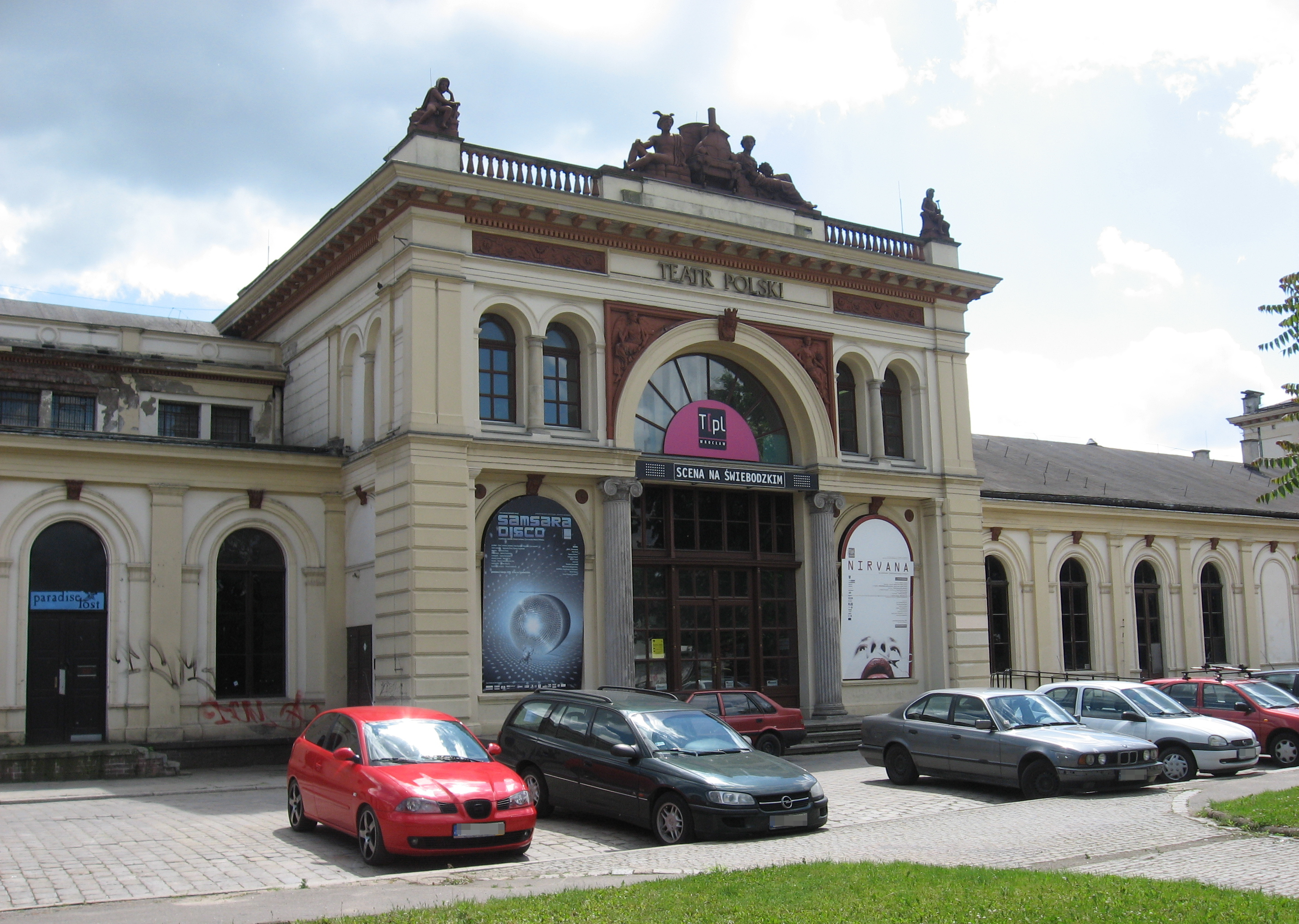
“Na Świebodzkim” Stage of Polish Theatre in Wrocław

The Polish Theatre in Wrocław (Polish: Teatr Polski we Wrocławiu) is one of the theatres in Wrocław, Poland. The Polish Theatre in Wrocław has three stages: Small Stage on 28 Świdnicka Street, “Na Świebodzkim” Stage, situated inside Świebodzki railway station's building at 20c Orląt Lwowskich Square, and Jerzy Grzegorzewski Stage located in the Theatre's main building at 3 Zapolska Street.

The main building, the result of the endeavors of a Wrocław merchant: Paul Auerbach, was designed by Berlin architect: Walter Hentschel and completed in 1909. For the standards of the time it was both very functional and technically advanced. In the early 1930s, the theatre, called Schauspielhaus in German, was the newest and, with 1736 seats, also the biggest stage in Wroclaw. Since its beginning, the theatre functioned as a musical theatre, where mostly operetta was staged. Towards the end of World War Two the theatre's building was partly damaged.

The theatre's present official name is The Polish Theatre in Wrocław. The building on Zapolska Street was reconstructed in 1950, and in the same year, on February 20, it held its first premiere. The play was: A Thousand Brave Men and was written by architect Jan Rojewski. It was a socialist propagandist play about workers struggling to repair the war damage in Polish cities. For Wrocław's audience it was a completely new type of modern drama. The theatre was in use until 1994, when during the night of January 18 a fire broke out and destroyed the auditorium. The theatre was once again rebuilt, this time according to the design of Witold Jackiewicz. The play staged during the opening ceremony on May 20, 1996 was Wroclaw Improvisations, directed by Andrzej Wajda himself.
