= Modern (political party) =

Political party in Poland (2015–2025)

Modern.Nowoczesna
- Founder: Ryszard Petru
- Founded: May 2015
- Dissolved: 24 October 2025
- Merged into: Civic Coalition
- Youth wing: Młodzi Nowocześni
- Membership (2025): ~800
- Ideology: Liberalism (Polish); Neoliberalism; Pro-Europeanism
- Political position: Centre-right
- National affiliation: Civic Coalition; Senate Pact 2023 (for 2023 Senate election)
- European affiliation: Alliance of Liberals and Democrats for Europe
- Colours: Blue

Website
- nowoczesna.org
- Politics of Poland; Political parties; Elections; A: The party has also been described as centrist or right-wing.

Modern (Polish: Nowoczesna, styled as ".Nowoczesna") was a centre-right liberal political party in Poland.

It was formed in 2015 as "NowoczesnaPL" although it had to change the name to ".Nowoczesna" later that year due to a dispute with the similarly named Modern Poland Foundation. Its first president Ryszard Petru served until 2017, when he was succeeded by Katarzyna Lubnauer. It first gained seats in the 2015 parliamentary election, and in 2018 it joined the Civic Coalition to participate together in the local elections. Szłapka was elected as the president in 2019. Modern was a member of the Alliance of Liberals and Democrats for Europe, and it was orientated towards the principles of liberalism, neoliberalism, and classical liberalism. It also supported Poland's membership in the European Union.

== History ==
The party was founded in late May 2015 as NowoczesnaPL (ModernPL) by economist Ryszard Petru. The founding convention was held on 31 May 2015 at which around 6,000 people gathered to participate. The chairman presented the program of the party, and besides him, other activists spoke during the convention. In August 2015, the party's name was changed to .Modern (.Nowoczesna) due to controversy over its name – there had already been a non-governmental organization called the Modern Poland Foundation. Around the same time, the party's new logo was presented, and Kamila Gasiuk-Pihowicz became its spokesperson. The party received 7.6% of votes in the 2015 parliamentary election, which resulted in winning 28 seats in the Sejm.

The party was admitted into the Alliance of Liberals and Democrats for Europe (ALDE) on 4 June 2016. From the 2015 election to end of 2016 Nowoczesna had more support in polls than Platforma Obywatelska. It has lost it after image problems of Ryszard Petru. Katarzyna Lubnauer became the leader of Nowoczesna in November 2017. In leader elections at the party congress, Lubnauer received 149 votes and Petru received 140 votes.

In March 2018, Modern and Civic Platform formed the Civic Coalition electoral alliance to contest the 2018 local elections. In May 2018, founder Ryszard Petru left the party. In 2019, Modern was running for the European Parliament as part of the European Coalition. In June 2019, Modern joined the Civic Platform - Civic Coalition parliamentary group. During the 2019 Polish parliamentary elections the party was a member of the Civic Coalition along with the Civic Platform, Polish Initiative and the Greens. After these elections, Modern rejoined the Civic Coalition parliamentary group, and Adam Szłapka was elected as president of the party.

On 24 October 2025, Adam Szłapka informed that Nowoczesna's party convention voted to dissolve the party, with 146 votes for, 8 against, and 3 abstentions. The party declared that although it had dissolved itself, it will continue its activity through the Civic Coalition and merged with Civic Platform at the Civic Coalition unification congress.

== Ideology ==
Political alignment of Polish parties by political scientists Seongcheol Kim and Endre Borbáth. Nowoczesna is coded as Nowo, and occupies an economically right-wing and socially liberal position.

Political alignment of Polish parties in 2010 and 2019 by Alexandra A. Żubrowicz. Nowoczesna is shown as an economically right-wing, socially liberal, and pro-EU party.

The party has been compared to the Free Democratic Party of Germany (FDP), with its emphasis on economic liberalism in its policy platform. It was economically and socially liberal. The party was described as neoliberal, and right-wing liberal. It was pro European integration and advocated for Poland to join the Eurozone. It supported LGBTQIA+ rights such as same-sex partnerships and the legalization of abortion. It also supported in-vitro fertilization. Economically the party was for lowering taxes and deregulating the economy. The party also wanted to reduce the size of the public sector via privatization and deregulate employment rights. One of the party's more controversial proposals included increasing the retirement age in Poland. It used to be described as centre-left, but swung to the right upon embracing neoliberal economic positions. It was described as centrist,, or centre-right. As of 2024, it was also described as a right-wing party.

== Leadership ==
=== Party leaders ===
No.	Image	Name	Start date	End date	Time
1.		Ryszard Petru	31 May 2015	25 November 2017	2 years, 178 days
2.		Katarzyna Lubnauer	25 November 2017	24 November 2019	1 year, 364 days
3.		Adam Szłapka	24 November 2019	24 October 2025	5 years, 334 days

=== Parliamentary leaders ===
No.	Image	Name	Start date	End date	Time
1.		Ryszard Petru	12 November 2015	26 April 2017	1 year, 165 days
2.		Katarzyna Lubnauer	26 April 2017	9 January 2018	258 days
3.		Kamila Gasiuk-Pihowicz	9 January 2018	5 December 2018	330 days
4.		Katarzyna Lubnauer	6 December 2018	7 December 2018	1 day
5.		Paweł Pudłowski	7 December 2018	12 June 2019	187 days

On 13 June 2019, members of Modern joined the Civic Coalition parliamentary group.

== Election results ==
=== Sejm ===
Election	Leader	Votes	%	Seats	+/–	Government
2015	Ryszard Petru	1,155,370	7.6 (#4)	28 / 460	New	PiS
2019	Katarzyna Lubnauer	315,209	1.7 (#2)	8 / 460	▼20	PiS
2019	As part of Civic Coalition, which won 134 seats in total.					
2023	Adam Szłapka	375,776	1.7 (#2)	6 / 460	▼2	
2023	Adam Szłapka	375,776	1.7 (#2)	6 / 460	▼2	PiS Minority (2023)
2023	Adam Szłapka	375,776	1.7 (#2)	6 / 460	▼2	KO–PL2050–PSL–NL (2023-present)
2023	As part of Civic Coalition, which won 157 seats in total.					

=== Senate ===
Election	Votes	%	Seats	+/–	Majority
2015	394 817	2.6 (#5)	0 / 100	New	PiS
2019	84,889	0.5 (#2)	1 / 100	▲1	KO–KP–SLD
2019	As part of Civic Coalition, which won 43 seats in total.				

=== European Parliament ===
Election	Leader	Votes	%	Seats	+/–	EP Group
2019	Katarzyna Lubnauer	5,249,935	38.47 (#2)	0 / 53	New	–
2019	As part of European Coalition, which won 22 seats in total.					
2024	Adam Szłapka	4,359,443	37.06 (#1)	0 / 52	0	–
2024	As part of Civic Coalition, which won 21 seats in total.					

=== Regional assemblies ===
Election	Percentage of vote	Number of overall seats won	+/–
2018	27.1 (#2)	31 / 552	New
2018	As part of Civic Coalition, which won 194 seats in total.		
