= List of members of the European Parliament for Poland, 2004–2009 =

This is the list of the 54 members of the European Parliament for Poland in the 2004 to 2009 session.

== List ==
Name	National party	Constituency	EP Group
Filip Adwent (until 26 June 2005) Andrzej Tomasz Zapałowski (from 12 July 2005)	League of Polish Families (LPR) (until 13 June 2007) Independent	Podkarpackie	IND&DEM (until 12 December 2006) UEN
Adam Bielan	Law and Justice (PiS)	Lesser Poland and Świętokrzyskie	UEN
Jerzy Buzek	Civic Platform (PO)	Silesia	EPP–ED
Zdzisław Chmielewski	Civic Platform (PO)	Lubusz and West Pomerania	EPP–ED
Sylwester Chruszcz	League of Polish Families (LPR) (until 3 December 2008) Forward Poland (NP)	Lower Silesian and Opole	IND&DEM (until 14 December 2005) NI (until 17 December 2008) UEN
Marek Czarnecki	Self-Defence of the Republic of Poland (SRP) (until 4 May 2008) Independent	Masovia	NI (until 14 November 2006) UEN (until 9 June 2008) ALDE
Ryszard Czarnecki	Self-Defence of the Republic of Poland (SRP) (until 23 January 2008) Independent (until 9 October 2008) Law and Justice (PiS)	Lower Silesian and Opole	NI (until 14 November 2006) UEN
Anna Elżbieta Fotyga (until 22 November 2005) Hanna Foltyn-Kubicka (from 7 December 2005)	Law and Justice (PiS)	Pomerania	UEN
Bronisław Geremek (until 13 July 2008) Andrzej Wielowieyski (from 26 August 2008)	Freedom Union (UW) (until 14 June 2005) Freedom Union - Democratic Party	Warsaw	ALDE
Lidia Geringer de Oedenberg	Democratic Left Alliance – Labour Union (SLD-UP)	Lower Silesian and Opole	PES
Adam Gierek	Democratic Left Alliance – Labour Union (SLD-UP)	Silesia	PES
Maciej Giertych	League of Polish Families (LPR)	Silesia	IND&DEM (until 14 December 2005) NI
Bogdan Golik	Self-Defence of the Republic of Poland (SRP) (until 16 December 2007) Independent	Łódź	NI (until 30 November 2004) PES
Genowefa Grabowska	Social Democracy of Poland (SDPL)	Silesia	PES
Dariusz Grabowski	League of Polish Families (LPR) (4 June 2007) Independent	Masovia	IND&DEM (until 12 December 2006) UEN
Małgorzata Handzlik	Civic Platform (PO)	Silesia	EPP–ED
Stanisław Jałowiecki	Civic Platform (PO)	Lower Silesian and Opole	EPP–ED
Mieczysław Janowski	Law and Justice (PiS)	Podkarpackie	UEN
Filip Kaczmarek	Civic Platform (PO)	Greater Poland	EPP–ED
Michał Kamiński (until 6 August 2007) Ewa Tomaszewska (from 30 August 2007)	Law and Justice (PiS)	Warsaw	UEN
Bogdan Klich (until 15 November 2007) Urszula Gacek (from 6 December 2007)	Civic Platform (PO)	Lesser Poland and Świętokrzyskie	EPP–ED
Urszula Krupa	League of Polish Families (LPR) (13 June 2006) Independent	Łódź	IND&DEM
Wiesław Kuc	Self-Defence of the Republic of Poland (SRP)	Lublin	NI (until 30 November 2004) PES (until 12 December 2006) UEN
Barbara Kudrycka (until 15 November 2007) Krzysztof Hołowczyc (from 6 December 2007)	Civic Platform (PO) (until 18 December 2007) Independent	Podlaskie and Warmian-Masuria	EPP–ED
Jan Kułakowski	Freedom Union (UW)	Greater Poland	ALDE
Zbigniew Kuźmiuk	Polish People's Party (PSL)	Masovia	EPP–ED (12 December 2005) UEN
Janusz Lewandowski	Civic Platform (PO)	Pomerania	EPP–ED
Bogusław Liberadzki	Democratic Left Alliance – Labour Union (SLD-UP)	Lubusz and West Pomeranian	PES
Marcin Libicki	Law and Justice (PiS)	Greater Poland	UEN
Janusz Wojciechowski	Polish People's Party (PSL)		EPP–ED (12 December 2005) UEN
Jan Masiel	Self-Defence of the Republic of Poland (SRP) Polish People's Party "Piast" (PSL Piast)		NI (14 November 2006) UEN
Jan Olbrycht			EPP–ED
Janusz Onyszkiewicz			ALDE
Bogdan Pęk	League of Polish Families (LPR) (until 24 January 2006) Independent (until 5 November 2008) Forward Poland (NP)	Lesser Poland and Świętokrzyskie	IND&DEM (until 12 December 2006) UEN
Józef Pinior	Social Democracy of Poland (SDPL)		PES
Mirosław Piotrowski	League of Polish Families (LPR) (3 December 2006) Independent		IND&DEM (until 12 December 2006) UEN
Paweł Piskorski	Civic Platform (PO) (until 31 March 2009) Alliance of Democrats		EPP–ED (until 30 April 2006) NI (22 October 2006) ALDE
Zdzisław Podkański	Polish People's Party (PSL)		EPP–ED (until 12 December 2005) UEN
Jacek Protasiewicz	Civic Platform (PO)		EPP–ED
Bogusław Rogalski	League of Polish Families (LPR) (until 24 January 2006) Polish Forum (until 2 December 2008) Forward Poland (NP)	Podlaskie and Warmian-Masuria	IND&DEM (until 12 December 2006) UEN
Dariusz Rosati			PES
Wojciech Roszkowski			UEN
Leopold Rutowicz	Self-Defence of the Republic of Poland (SRP)		NI (until 14 November 2006) UEN
Jacek Saryusz-Wolski			EPP–ED
Czesław Siekierski			EPP–ED
Marek Siwiec			PES
Bogusław Sonik			EPP–ED
Grażyna Staniszewska			ALDE
Andrzej Szejna			PES
Konrad Szymański			UEN
Witold Tomczak	League of Polish Families (LPR)	Greater Poland	IND&DEM
Wojciech Wierzejski (until 6 October 2005) Bernard Piotr Wojciechowski (from 26 October 2005)	League of Polish Families (LPR) (until 15 April 2007) Independent		IND&DEM (until 14 December 2005) NI (until 28 March 2007) IND&DEM
Zbigniew Zaleski			EPP–ED
Tadeusz Zwiefka	Civic Platform (PO)	Kuyavian-Pomerania	EPP–ED
