= List of members of the European Parliament for Poland, 2009–2014 =

This is the list of the 50 members of the European Parliament for Poland in the 2009 to 2014 session. One person from People's Party entered the Parliament in December 2011, bringing the number of MEPs to 51.

== List ==
Name	National party	EP Group	Constituency
Adam Bielan	Law and Justice (until 20 February 2011) Poland Comes First (until 12 June 2012) Independent (until 20 January 2014) Poland Together	ECR	
Piotr Borys	Civic Platform	EPP	
Arkadiusz Bratkowski	People's Party	EPP	
Jerzy Buzek	Civic Platform	EPP	
Tadeusz Cymański	Law and Justice (3 April 2012) United Poland	ECR (until 28 December 2011) EFD	
Ryszard Czarnecki	Law and Justice	ECR	
Lidia Geringer de Oedenberg	Democratic Left Alliance–Labor Union	S&D	
Adam Gierek	Democratic Left Alliance–Labor Union	S&D	
Marek Gróbarczyk	Law and Justice	ECR	
Andrzej Grzyb	People's Party	EPP	
Róża Thun	Civic Platform	EPP	
Małgorzata Handzlik	Civic Platform	EPP	
Jolanta Hibner	Civic Platform	EPP	
Danuta Hubner	Civic Platform	EPP	
Danuta Jazłowiecka	Civic Platform	EPP	
Sidonia Jędrzejewska	Civic Platform	EPP	
Filip Kaczmarek	Civic Platform	EPP	
Jarosław Kalinowski	People's Party	EPP	
Michał Kamiński	Law and Justice (until 20 February 2011) Poland Comes First (until 13 January 2014) Independent	ECR	
Lena Kolarska-Bobińska	Civic Platform	EPP	
Paweł Kowal	Law and Justice (until 20 February 2011) Poland Comes First (until 13 January 2014) Poland Together	ECR	
Jacek Kurski	Law and Justice (3 April 2012) United Poland	ECR (until 28 December 2011) EFD	
Ryszard Legutko	Law and Justice	ECR	
Janusz Lewandowski (until 9 February 2010) Jan Kozłowski (from 4 March 2010)	Civic Platform	EPP	
Bogusław Liberadzki	Democratic Left Alliance–Labor Union	S&D	
Krzysztof Lisek	Civic Platform	EPP	
Elżbieta Łukacijewska	Civic Platform	EPP	
Bogdan Marcinkiewicz	Civic Platform	EPP	
Marek Migalski	Law and Justice (until 20 February 2011) Poland Comes First (until 13 January 2014) Poland Together	ECR	
Sławomir Nitras	Civic Platform	EPP	
Wojciech Olejniczak	Democratic Left Alliance–Labor Union	S&D	
Jan Olbrycht	Civic Platform	EPP	
Mirosław Piotrowski	Law and Justice	ECR	
Tomasz Poręba	Law and Justice	ECR	
Jacek Protasiewicz	Civic Platform	EPP	
Jacek Saryusz-Wolski	Civic Platform	EPP	
Joanna Senyszyn	Democratic Left Alliance–Labor Union	S&D	
Czesław Siekierski	People's Party	EPP	
Marek Siwiec	Democratic Left Alliance–Labor Union	S&D	
Joanna Skrzydlewska	Civic Platform	EPP	
Bogusław Sonik	Civic Platform	EPP	
Konrad Szymański	Law and Justice	ECR	
Rafał Trzaskowski (until 2 December 2013) Tadeusz Ross (from 17 December 2013)	Civic Platform	EPP	
Jarosław Wałęsa	Civic Platform	EPP	
Jacek Włosowicz	Law and Justice (3 April 2012) United Poland	ECR (until 28 December 2011) EFD	
Janusz Wojciechowski	Law and Justice	ECR	
Zbigniew Zaleski	Civic Platform	EPP	
Paweł Zalewski	Civic Platform	EPP	
Artur Zasada	Civic Platform (20 January 2014) Poland Together	EPP (8 January 2014) ECR	
Janusz Zemke	Democratic Left Alliance–Labor Union	S&D	
Zbigniew Ziobro	Law and Justice (28 December 2011) United Poland	ECR (until 28 December 2011) EFD	
Tadeusz Zwiefka	Civic Platform	EPP	
