= Subcarpathian (European Parliament constituency) =

Constituency of the European Parliament

- European Parliament constituency
- Location among the current constituencies

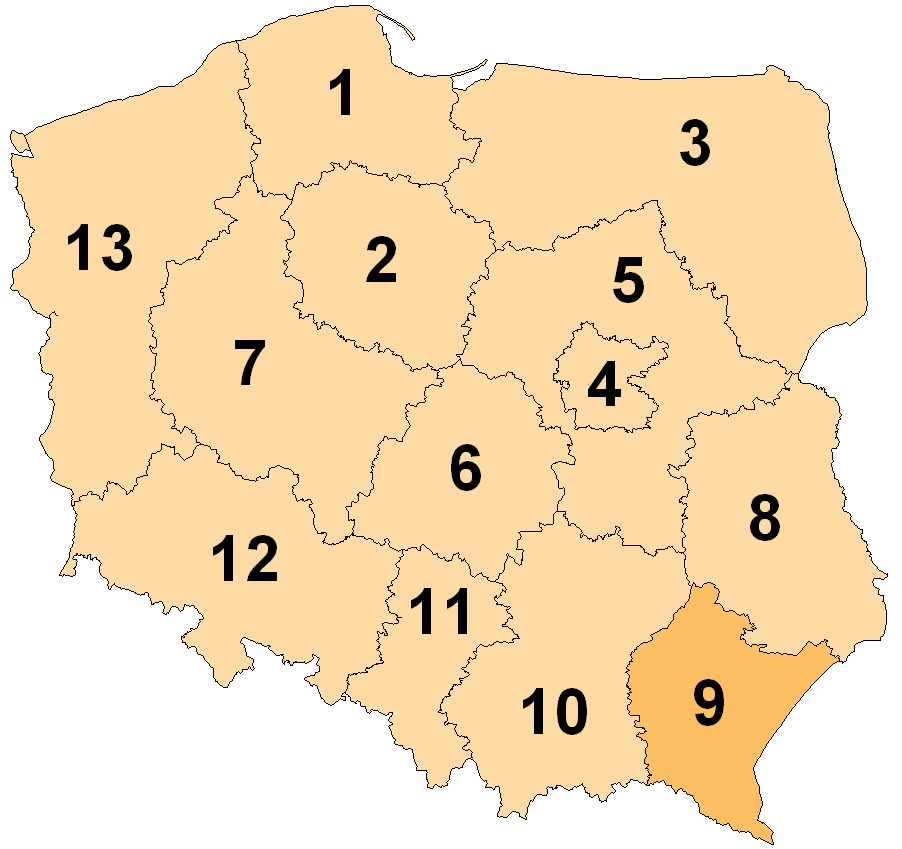
- 9th constituency in Poland
- Member state: Poland
- Created: 2004
- MEPs: 2 (2004-2014); 3 (2014-2024); 4 (since 2024)

Subcarpathian (Polish: podkarpackie) is a constituency represented in the European Parliament. The constituency covers the area of the Subcarpathian Voivodeship.

== Nomenclature ==
The relevant Polish legislation ("The Act of 23 January 2004 on Elections to the European Parliament") establishing the constituencies does not give the constituencies formal names. Instead, each constituency has a number, territorial description, and location of the Constituency Electoral Commission. The 2004 Polish National Election Commission and the 2004 European Parliament Election website uses the territorial description when referring to the constituency, not the electoral commission location.

== Members of the European Parliament ==
Election	MEP (party)	MEP (party)	MEP (party)	MEP (party)
2004	Filip Adwent (LPR)	Mieczysław Janowski (PiS)	2 seats 2004-2014	
2005	Andrzej Tomasz Zapałowski (LPR)	Mieczysław Janowski (PiS)	2 seats 2004-2014	
2009	Elżbieta Łukacijewska (PO) (KE) (KO)	Tomasz Poręba (PiS)	2 seats 2004-2014	
2014	Elżbieta Łukacijewska (PO) (KE) (KO)	Tomasz Poręba (PiS)	Stanisław Ożóg (PiS)	3 seats 2014-2024
2019	Elżbieta Łukacijewska (PO) (KE) (KO)	Tomasz Poręba (PiS)	Bogdan Rzońca (PiS)	3 seats 2014-2024
2024	Elżbieta Łukacijewska (PO) (KE) (KO)	Daniel Obajtek (PiS)	Bogdan Rzońca (PiS)	Tomasz Buczek (KWiN)

== Election results ==
=== 2004 ===
2004 European Parliament election
Electoral committee	Votes	%	Seats
League of Polish Families	81,342	24.00	1
Law and Justice	66,530	19.63	1
Civic Platform	45,463	13.42	–
Self-Defence of the Republic of Poland	38,410	11.33	–
Polish People's Party	37,786	11.15	–
Democratic Left Alliance – Labour Union	29,209	8.62	–
Social Democracy of Poland	10,177	3.00	–
Freedom Union	6,704	1.98	–
National Electoral Committee	6,101	1.80	–
Real Politics Union	3,806	1.12	–
All-Poland Civic Coalition	3,259	0.96	–
Konfederacja Ruch Obrony Bezrobotnych	3,087	0.91	–
KPEiR–PLD	2,914	0.86	–
Initiative for Poland	2,413	0.71	–
Polish Labour Party	1,673	0.49	–
Total	338,874	100.00	2
Valid votes	338,874	97.19	
Invalid/blank votes	9,800	2.81	
Total votes	348,674	100.00	
Registered voters/turnout	1,614,976	21.59	
Source: PKW

=== 2009 ===
2009 European Parliament election
Electoral committee	Votes	%	Seats
Law and Justice	153,661	41.88	1
Civic Platform	107,092	29.19	1
Polish People's Party	45,685	12.45	–
Democratic Left Alliance – Labour Union	27,147	7.40	–
Right Wing of the Republic	11,136	3.04	–
Agreement for the Future – CenterLeft	6,094	1.66	–
Self-Defence of the Republic of Poland	5,734	1.56	–
Real Politics Union	4,310	1.17	–
Libertas Poland	3,753	1.02	–
Polish Labour Party	2,274	0.62	–
Total	366,886	100.00	2
Valid votes	366,886	98.04	
Invalid/blank votes	7,349	1.96	
Total votes	374,235	100.00	
Registered voters/turnout	1,679,634	22.28	
Source: National Electoral Commission

=== 2014 ===
2014 European Parliament election
Electoral committee	Votes	%	Seats
Law and Justice	196,247	49.29	2
Civic Platform	73,381	18.43	1
Polish People's Party	28,927	7.27	–
Congress of the New Right	28,474	7.15	–
United Poland	23,512	5.91	–
Democratic Left Alliance – Labour Union	18,761	4.71	–
Poland Together	13,820	3.47	–
Europa Plus—Your Movement	7,826	1.97	–
National Movement	7,204	1.81	–
Total	398,152	100.00	3
Valid votes	398,152	97.02	
Invalid/blank votes	12,242	2.98	
Total votes	410,394	100.00	
Registered voters/turnout	1,710,529	23.99	

=== 2019 ===
2019 European Parliament election
Electoral committee	Votes	%	Seats
Law and Justice	485,779	65.07	2
European Coalition	160,988	21.56	1
Confederation	43,976	5.89	–
Kukiz'15	25,216	3.38	–
Spring	22,881	3.06	–
Lewica Razem	5,308	0.71	–
PolEXIT-Coalition	2,388	0.32	–
Total	746,536	100.00	3
Valid votes	746,536	99.15	
Invalid/blank votes	6,396	0.85	
Total votes	752,932	100.00	
Registered voters/turnout	1,702,111	44.24	
Source: National Electoral Commission

=== 2024 ===
2024 European Parliament election
Electoral committee	Votes	%	Seats
Law and Justice	334,439	52.87	2
Civic Coalition	150,131	23.73	1
Confederation	96,376	15.23	1
Third Way	29,767	4.71	0
The Left	13,082	2.07	0
Bezpartyjni Samorządowcy	7,315	1.16	0
PolExit	1,516	0.24	0
Total	632,626	100.00	4
Valid votes	632,626	99.40	
Invalid/blank votes	3,846	0.60	
Total votes	636,472	100.00	
Registered voters/turnout	1,653,384	38.50	
Source: National Electoral Commission
