= Forward Poland =

Forward Poland Naprzód Polsko
- Abbreviation: NP
- Leader: Janusz Dobrosz (until 2009); Janusz Szewczak (since 2009)
- Founded: 12 October 2008
- Dissolved: 19 May 2010
- Split from: League of Polish Families
- Headquarters: ul. Wiejska 16 lok. 16 rural lok. 4/23 00-490 Warsaw
- Ideology: National conservatism Euroscepticism; Christian right
- European Parliament group: Union for Europe of the Nations
- Colours: white, red

Website
- naprzodpolsko.pl (archived)

Forward Poland Social Movement (Polish: Ruch Społeczny Naprzód Polsko), more usually rendered as Forward Poland (Naprzód Polsko, NP) was a national-conservative and Eurosceptic political party in Poland. It contended the 2009 European Parliament elections under a common banner with Polish People's Party "Piast" (PSL Piast). It was formed mainly by former members of the League of Polish Families (LPR), including its leader Janusz Dobrosz.

== History ==
The party dated back to the Interim Executive Board made up of Sylwester Chruszcz (former president of the LPR), Bogusław Rogalski and Jan Szewczak. The inaugural Congress was held on 29 November 2008, the Interim Executive Board was replaced and its constituent declaration drawn up.

Forward Poland originally intended to be part of Libertas, the pan-European political organization founded by Declan Ganley. Ganley came to Poland on 7 January 2009 to discuss terms with representatives from Forward Poland, PSL Piast and Prawica Rzeczypospolitej (PR). Ganley insisted that the party used the word "Libertas" but the party politicians were concerned that the non-Polish name would deter voters. The name "Forward Poland - Libertas" (Naprzód Polsko – Libertas) was suggested as a compromise.

Another Congress took place on 25 January 2009 in Warsaw. The party signed a declaration of cooperation with PSL Piast. Letters of support were received from Krzysztof Wyszkowski, Declan Ganley and Czech President Václav Klaus. Talks were held with representatives from PR, Unia Polityki Realnej (UPR) and Libertas. Talks were also held with representatives from Radio Maryja, which NP politicians had connections with from their days in LPR.

Forward Poland rejected cooperation with Libertas because Forward Poland felt that Libertas did not reflect their desire for a more independent Poland. However, Forward Poland accepted political cooperation and joint programming with PSL Piast to contend the 2009 European Parliament elections under a common banner ("Naprzód Polsko-Piast"), and formally signed the agreement to that effect on March 1, 2009. Present during the signing of the agreement were representatives from Konfederacja Polski Niepodległej (KPN), Zjednoczenie Chrześcijańsko-Narodowe (ZChN-u), Niezależny Samorządny Związek Zawodowy Rolników Indywidualnych "Solidarność", Związek Zawodowy Rolników "Ojczyzna" and Niezależny Samorządny Związek Zawodowy "Solidarność" 80.

On the 19 May 2010 the party was de-registered as a political party and liquidation was concluded by 19 October 2010. Their members joined various different existing right-wing parties.

== Structure ==
Position	Person
President	Janusz Dobrosz
Vice Presidents	Bogdan Pęk, Jan Szewczak
Secretary General	Sylwester Chruszcz
Chairman of the Policy Council	Dariusz Grabowski
Policy Council Vice President	Robert Rynkun-Werner
Treasurer	Andrzej Zapałowski
President of the Supreme Audit Commission	Peter Frosik
Spokesman	Bogusław Rogalski

== Forward Poland in the European institutions ==
Forward Poland had the following MEPs in the 2004-2009 term of the European Parliament

- Sylwester Chruszcz
- Dariusz Grabowski
- Bogdan Pęk
- Bogusław Rogalski
- Andrzej Zapałowski

They were all elected as members of LPR and all sat in the Union for Europe of the Nations group.
