= Information Office of the Opole Voivodeship in Brussels =

The Information Office of the Opole Voivodeship in Brussels (known as the Biuro Informacyjne Województwa Opolskiego w Brukseli in Polish), founded in 2000, acts as an office of the Polish region's interests in the European Union institutions. It was proposed by Tomasz Kamusella in late 1998 to the incoming first-ever Regional President of the Opole Voivodeship, Stanisław Jałowiecki, as one of a set of institutions that should prepare the region to the full participation in the process of European integration, and then run the region's participation in this process after Poland's accession to the European Union. The other institutions included the Dom Europejski (European House) for coordinating the region's European initiatives, and a financial institution that would ensure indispensable co-financing for EU initiatives. It was the already existing Fundacja Rozwoju Śląska oraz Wspierania Inicjatyw Lokalnych (Foundation for the Development of Silesia and for Supporting Local Initiatives) that agreed to shoulder the latter role. Arkadiusz Tkocz was the first director of the Brussels Office. Soon afterward, it became obvious that to safeguard the region's interests similar offices of the Opole Voivodeship had to be organized in the Polish capital of Warsaw and in the German Land of the Rhineland-Palatinate, with which the voivodeship closely cooperates.
