= 2004 European Parliament election in Poland =

- 13 June 2004

54 seats to the European Parliament
- Turnout: 20.87%
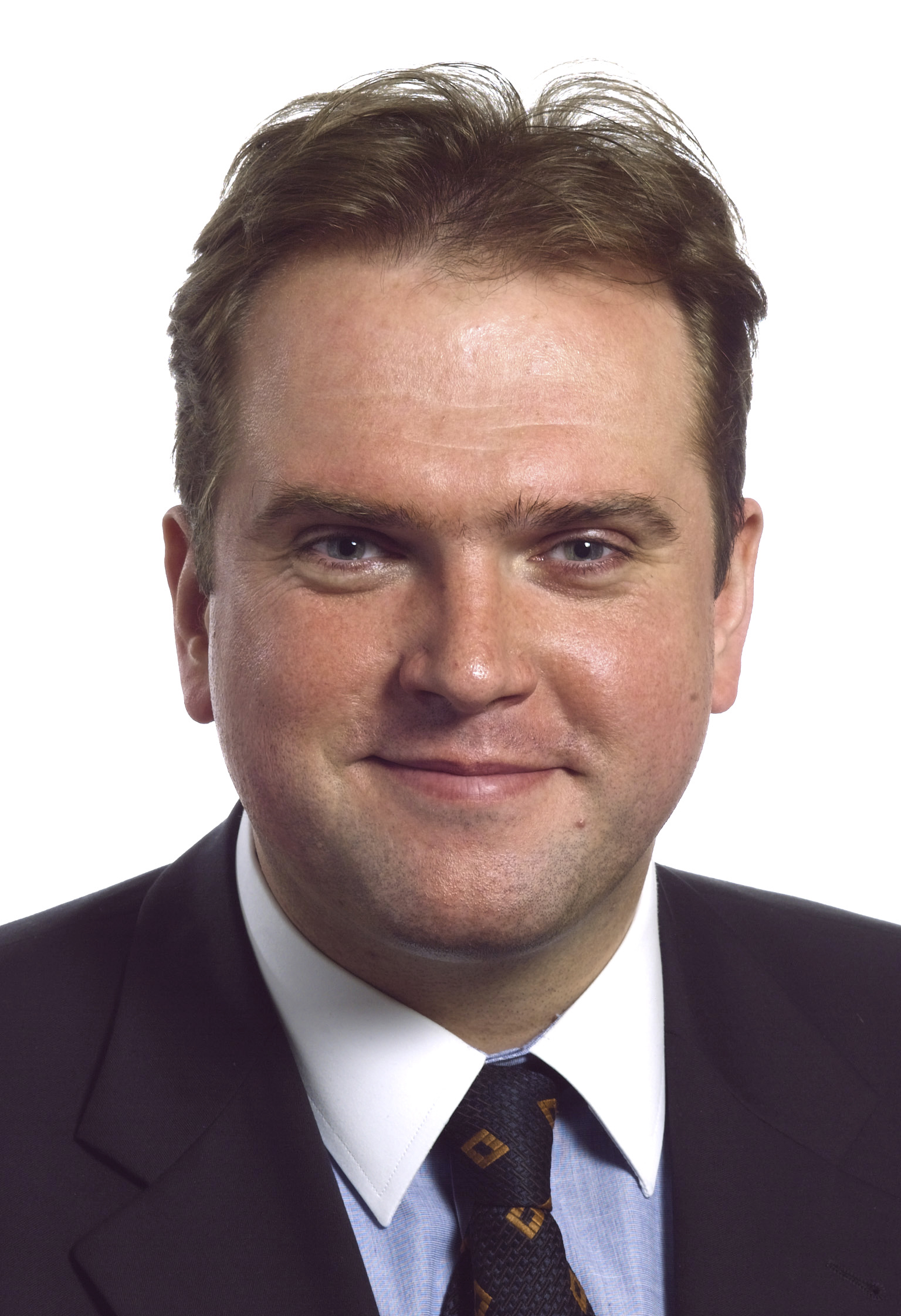

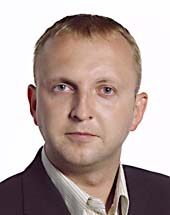

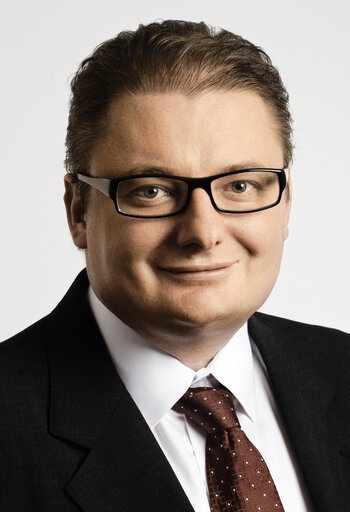

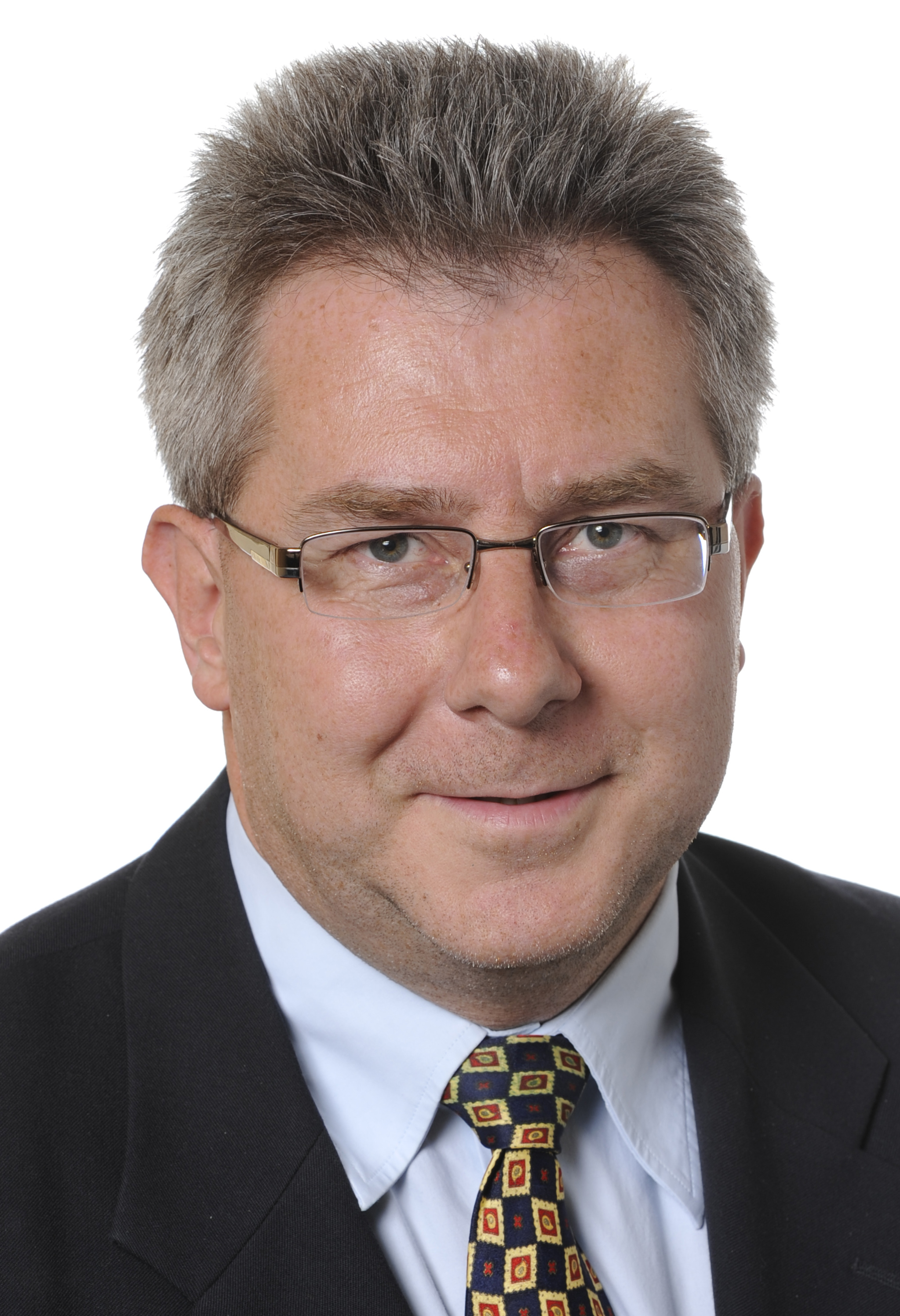

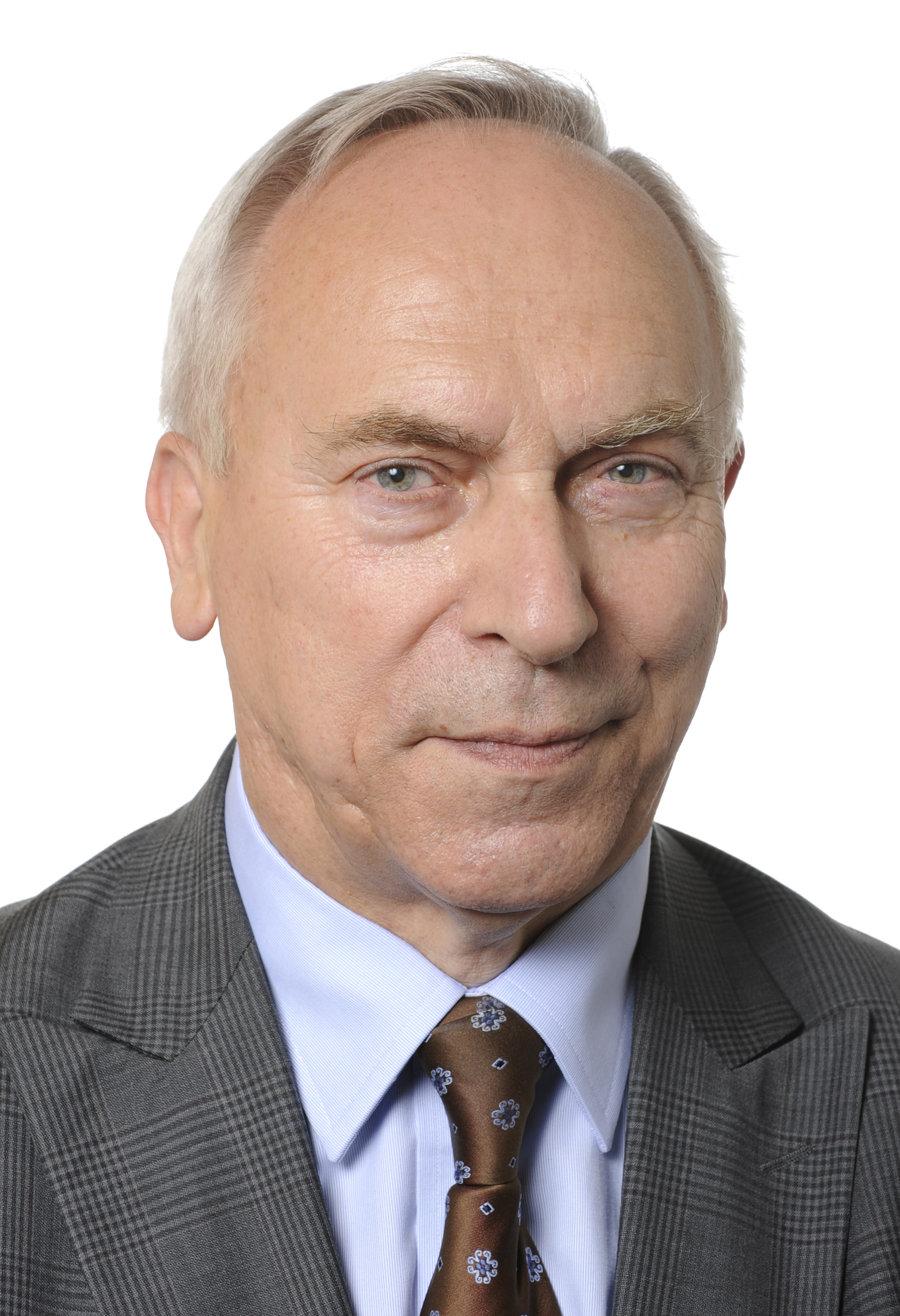

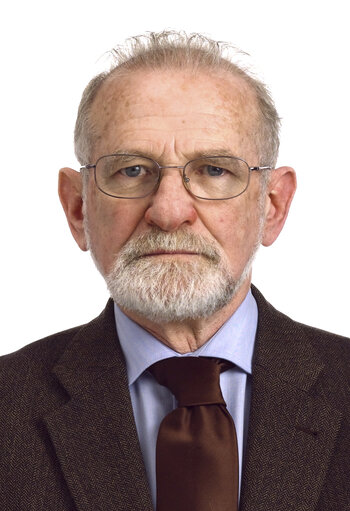

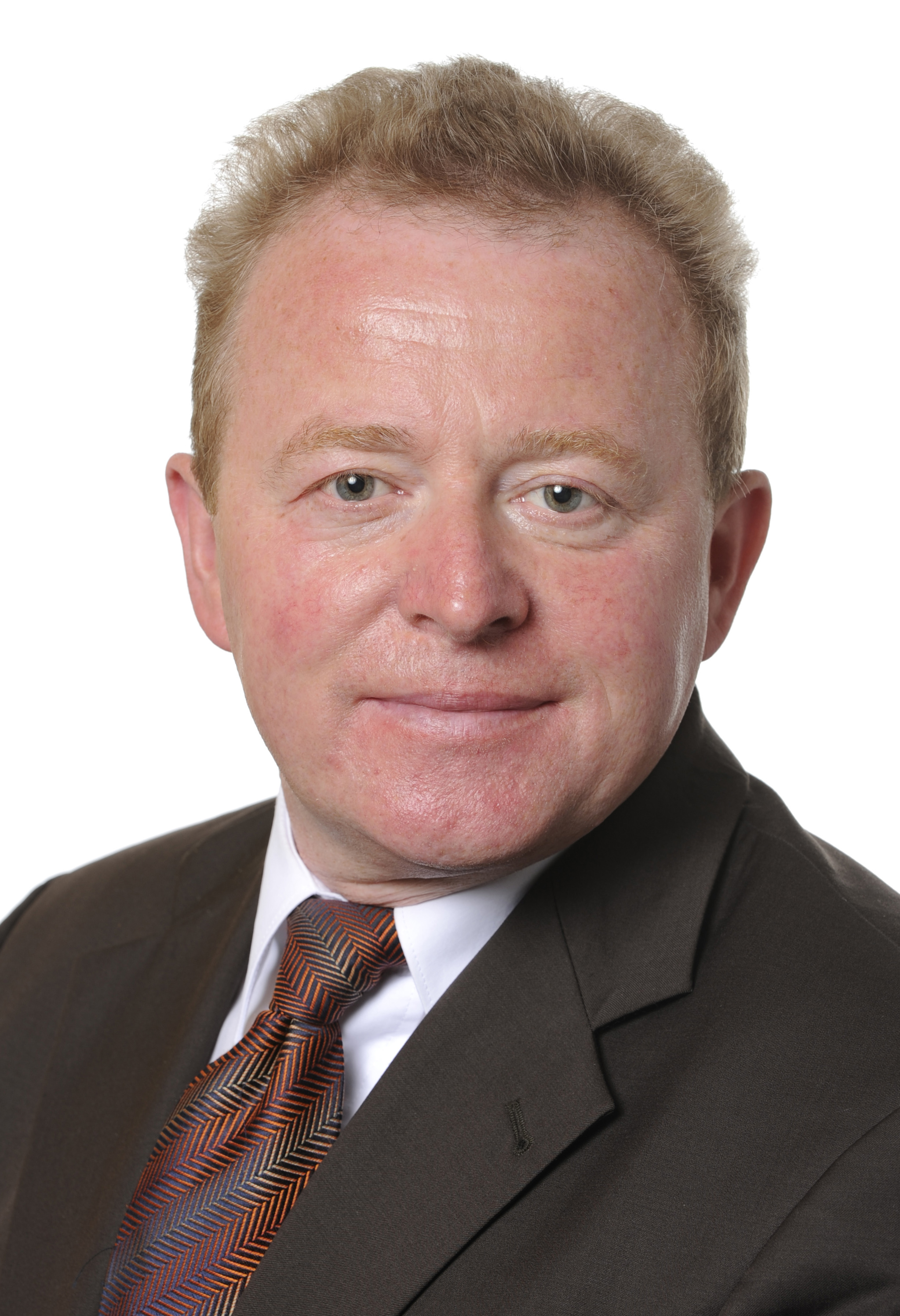

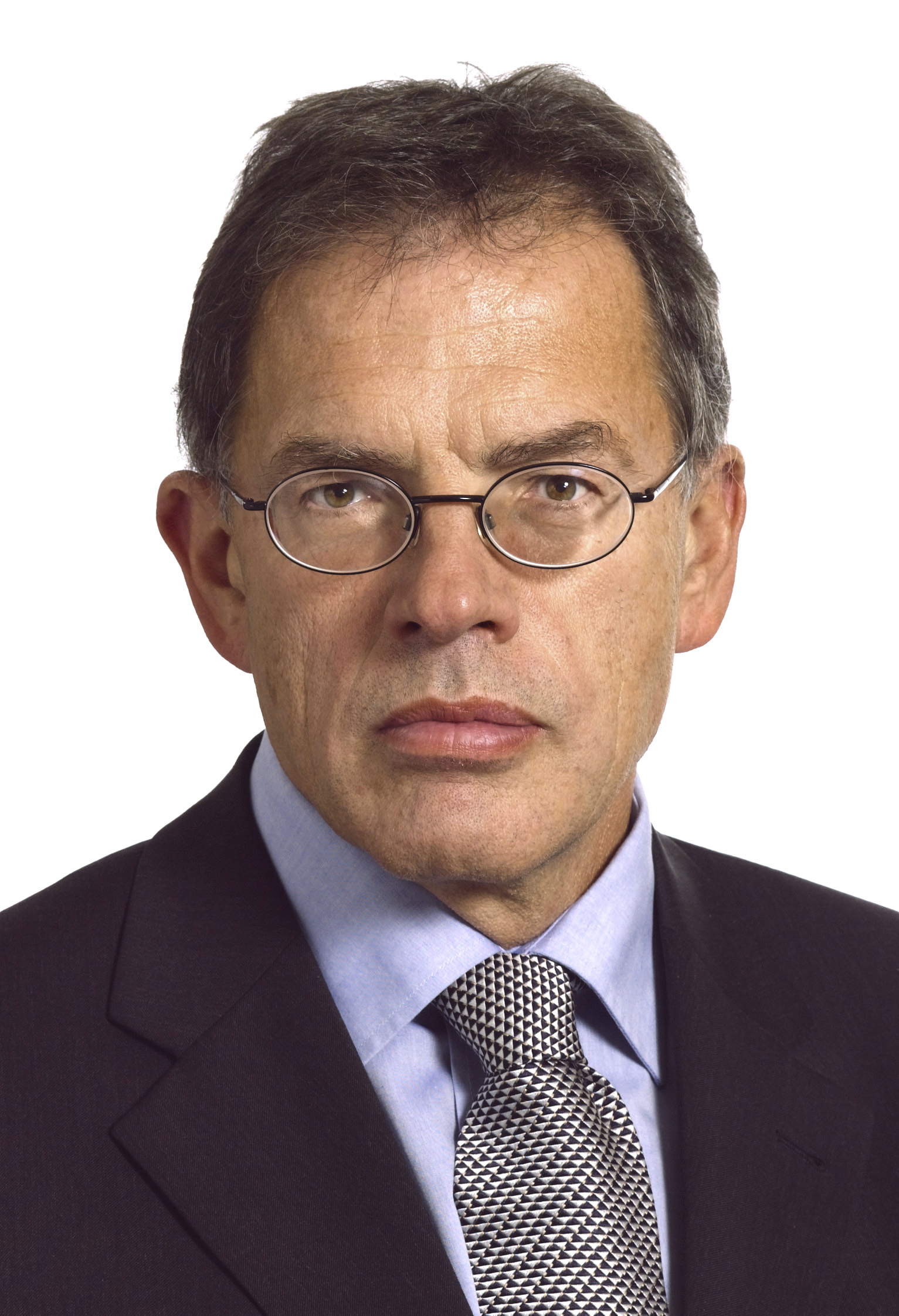
	First party	Second party	Third party
Leader	Paweł Piskorski	Wojciech Wierzejski	Michał Kamiński
Party	PO	LPR	PiS
Alliance	EPP	IND/DEM	AEN
Seats won	15	10	7
Popular vote	1,467,775	969,689	771,858
Percentage	24.1%	15.9%	12.7%
	Fourth party	Fifth party	Sixth party
Leader	Ryszard Czarnecki	Adam Gierek	Bronisław Geremek
Party	SRP	SLD	UW
Alliance	AEN/PES	PES	ALDE
Seats won	6	5	4
Popular vote	656,782	569,311	446,549
Percentage	10.8%	9.4%	7.3%
	Seventh party	Eighth party
Leader	Janusz Wojciechowski	Dariusz Rosati
Party	PSL	SDPL
Alliance	EPP	PES
Seats won	4	3
Popular vote	386,340	324,707
Percentage	6.3%	5.3%
- Election result and the plurality list's popular vote in each constituency

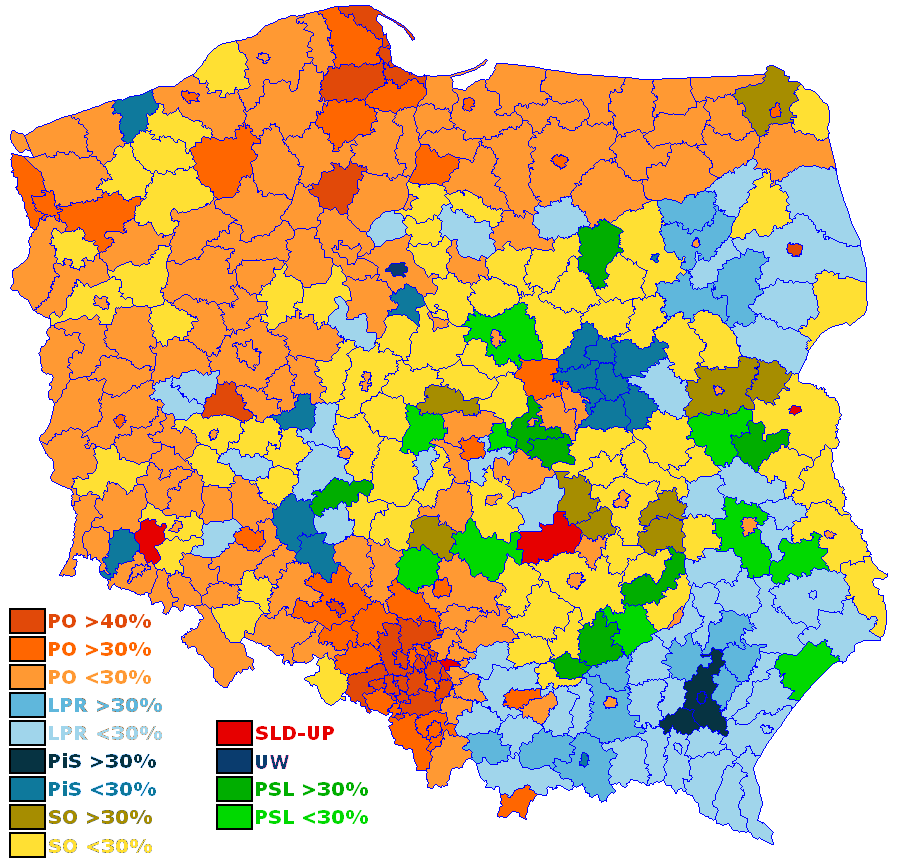
Result by Powiats

Elections to the European Parliament were held in Poland on 13 June 2004 as part of the wider 2004 European Parliament election. They were the first European Parliament elections held in Poland after the country's accession to the European Union in May 2004. Poland was allotted 54 members of the European Parliament. 20.87% of eligible citizens voted; of these, 97.33% of the votes cast were valid. The elections resulted in a heavy defeat for the governing Alliance of the Democratic Left and Labor Union parties, although the very low turnout makes a direct comparison with national election results difficult. As expected the most successful party was the Civic Platform. Second place was taken by the strongly anti-EU League of Polish Families.

The radical populist Self-Defence of the Republic of Poland, which some opinion polls had predicted would come second, came fourth after the Law and Justice party. The election results were a success for Social Democracy of Poland, which managed to cross the required 5% threshold, and the Freedom Union, which got over twice the expected percentage of votes.

== Opinion polls ==
Polling firm	PO	LPR	PiS	SRP	SLD-UP	UW	PSL	SDPL	Others	Lead
Election results	24.1%	15.9%	12.7%	10.8%	9.3%	7.3%	6.3%	5.3%	8.3%	8.2% over LPR
PBS	28%	15%	12%	14%	11%	5%	6%	4%	5%	13% over LPR
TNS OBOP	28.7%	15.1%	10.9%	14.4%	10.5%	5.3%	6.2%	4.1%	4.8%	13.6% over LPR
Exit polls
CBOS	31%	8%	14%	16%	10%	3%	4%	5%	9%	15% over SRP
PBS	30%	11%	11%	18%	8%	5%	7%	4%	6%	12% over SRP
TNS OBOP	27%	13%	6%	16%	6%	4%	4%	–	24%	11% over SRP
Ipsos	27%	12.6%	16.5%	16.5%	4.6%	3.8%	3.4%	5%	10.6%	10.5% over SRP/PiS
Pentor	26%	11%	12%	23%	8%	3%	6%	6%	5%	3% over SRP
Primary election	21.1%	6.9%	8.4%	18.4%	11.3%	7.3%	3.9%	9%	13.7%	2.7% over SRP

== Results ==
Party	Votes	%	Seats
Civic Platform	1,467,775	24.10	15
League of Polish Families	969,689	15.92	10
Law and Justice	771,858	12.67	7
Self-Defence of the Republic of Poland	656,782	10.78	6
Democratic Left Alliance – Labour Union	569,311	9.35	5
Freedom Union	446,549	7.33	4
Polish People's Party	386,340	6.34	4
Social Democracy of Poland	324,707	5.33	3
Real Politics Union	113,675	1.87	0
National Electoral Committee	94,867	1.56	0
Initiative for Poland	88,565	1.45	0
KPEiR–PLD	48,667	0.80	0
Konfederacja Ruch Obrony Bezrobotnych	36,937	0.61	0
All-Poland Civic Coalition	35,180	0.58	0
Polish Labour Party	32,807	0.54	0
Reason Party	18,068	0.30	0
Greens 2004	16,288	0.27	0
Democratic Party of the Left	5,513	0.09	0
Together for the Future	2,897	0.05	0
National Revival of Poland	2,546	0.04	0
Polish National Party	2,510	0.04	0
Total	6,091,531	100.00	54
Valid votes	6,091,531	97.33	
Invalid/blank votes	167,019	2.67	
Total votes	6,258,550	100.00	
Registered voters/turnout	29,986,109	20.87	
Source: PKW

== Elected members ==
=== Civic Platform ===
- Jerzy Buzek, ex-prime minister, professor of technical sciences
- Zdzisław Chmielewski, historian, rector of Szczecin University
- Małgorzata Handzlik, publisher and journalist
- Stanisław Jałowiecki, sociologist and politician
- Filip Kaczmarek, historian and journalist
- Bogdan Klich, expert on international politics
- Barbara Kudrycka, professor of law
- Janusz Lewandowski, economist, ex-minister of privatisation
- Jan Olbrycht, politician, ex-mayor of Cieszyn
- Jacek Saryusz-Wolski, economist, former Poland-EU negotiator
- Jacek Protasiewicz, philologist and politician
- Bogusław Sonik, lawyer and politician
- Zbigniew Zaleski, professor of psychology
- Tadeusz Zwiefka, journalist

=== League of Polish Families ===
- Filip Adwent, physician and author
- Sylwester Chruszcz, architect and politician
- Maciej Giertych, politician and publicist
- Dariusz Grabowski, economist, politician and businessman
- Urszula Krupa, doctor of medicine, journalist
- Mirosław Piotrowski, professor of history
- Bogdan Pęk, zootechnologist and politician
- Bogusław Rogalski, historian, farmer and political activist
- Witold Tomczak, physician and politician
- Wojciech Wierzejski, politician and sociologist

=== Law and Justice ===
- Adam Bielan, politician
- Anna Fotyga, international trade expert, vice-mayor of Gdańsk (2002–2004)
- Mieczysław Janowski, doctor of technical sciences, local activist
- Michał Kamiński, journalist and politician
- Marcin Libicki, arts historian and politician
- Wojciech Roszkowski, historian, professor of politics
- Konrad Szymanski, lawyer, journalist and politician

=== Self-Defense of the Republic of Poland ===
- Marek Czarnecki, lawyer, journalist and politician
- Ryszard Czarnecki, historian, journalist and politician
- Bogdan Golik, animal doctor and business adviser
- Wiesław Kuc, economist and agriculture expert
- Jan Masiel, psychiatrist and business adviser
- Leopold Rutowicz, economist and businessman

=== Democratic Left Alliance-Labor Union ===
- Adam Gierek, politician, son of Edward Gierek, communist leader of Poland in the 1970s
- Lidia Geringer d'Oedenberg, economist and journalist
- Bogusław Liberadzki, economist, ex-minister of transport
- Marek Siwiec, journalist, politician, president's advisor
- Andrzej Szejna, economist, politician

=== Freedom Union ===
- Bronisław Geremek, historian and politician, ex-minister of foreign affairs
- Jan Kulakowski, journalist, ex Poland-EU negotiator
- Janusz Onyszkiewicz, mathematician and politician, ex-minister of defence
- Grazyna Staniszewska, politician, senator

=== Polish People's Party ===
- Zbigniew Kuzmiuk, politician, chairman of PSL parliamentary caucus
- Zdzisław Podkański, historian and politician, vice chairman of PSL, ex-vice minister of culture
- Czesław Siekierski, agriculture economist, ex-vice minister of agriculture
- Janusz Wojciechowski, lawyer and politician, chairman of PSL since March 2004

=== Social Democratic Party of Poland ===
- Genowefa Grabowska, professor of international law, senator
- Józef Pinior, lawyer, economist and politician
- Dariusz Rosati, professor of economics, ex-minister of foreign affairs

=== Independent ===
- Paweł Piskorski, politician, ex-mayor of Warsaw

== See also ==
- Politics of Poland
- Poland (European Parliament constituency)
