= Tadeusz Zwiefka =

Polish journalist and politician (born 1954)

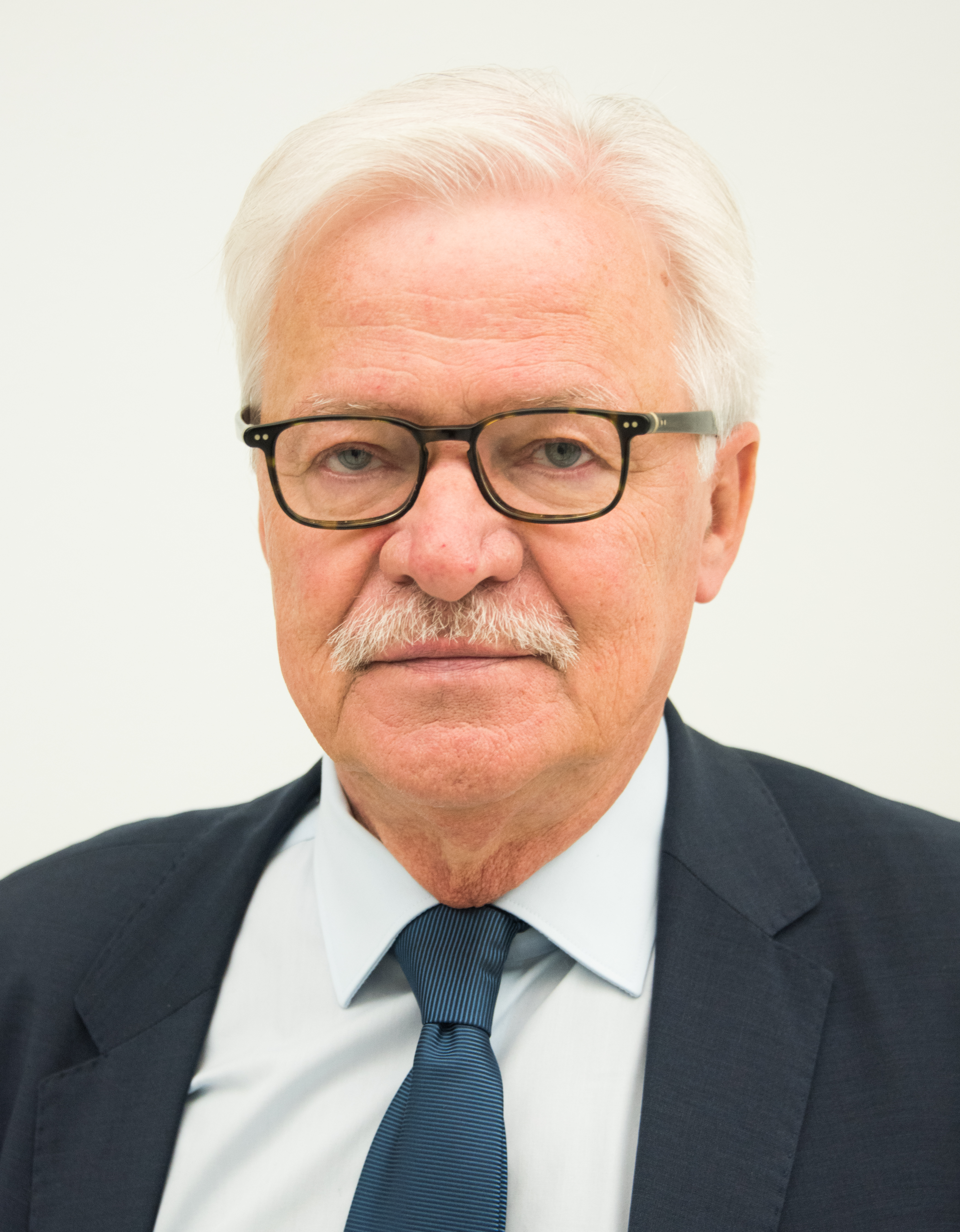

Member of European Parliament
- Incumbent
- Assumed office VI term: 20 July 2004; VII term: elect
- Constituency: Kuyavian-Pomeranian, Poland

Personal details
- Born: 28 December 1954 (age 71) Tuchola, Poland
- Party: Civic Platform

Tadeusz Antoni Zwiefka (Polish pronunciation: [taˈdɛ.uʐ ˈzvjɛfka]; born 28 December 1954 in Tuchola) is a Polish journalist and politician. Since 2004, member of the European Parliament.

== Biography ==
Tadeusz Zwiefka comes from Tuchola in Kuyavian-Pomeranian Voivodship, he worked in Szczecin and Warsaw, and today he lives in Poznań.

He is an educated lawyer but he works as a journalist in Polish TV (TVP) and a lecturer. He was an editor-in-chief of Polish TV regional centre in Poznań, later a journalist in central TVP1 news (Wiadomości), parliamentary reporter, director of the Szczecin TV regional centre. He was a co-founder of the popular Telekurier reporters magazine in TVP3.

He is also an academic lecturer of TV journalism and Polish language culture in Poznań colleges and in the Higher School of Environmental Management in Tuchola (Wyższa Szkoła Zarządzania Środowiskiem w Tucholi). Besides his native Polish language, he speaks some German, English and Russian.

In the European elections of 13 June 2004 he was a candidate of Civic Platform in Kuyavian-Pomeranian constituency and received 26,144 votes - the best result made him the only MEP in the region.

In the 2009 elections he was re-elected to the European Parliament. He polled 82,794 votes, as a candidate from the Civic Platform list. He was the top-scored candidate in the Kuyavian-Pomeranian constituency. On 12 September 2018, he voted in favor of approving the controversial Directive on Copyright in the Digital Single Market.

He received:
Golden Cross of Merit

== See also ==
- Kuyavian-Pomeranian (European Parliament constituency)
- MEPs for Poland 2004–2009
- MEPs for Poland 2009–2014
