= Danuta Jazłowiecka =

Polish politician (born 1957)

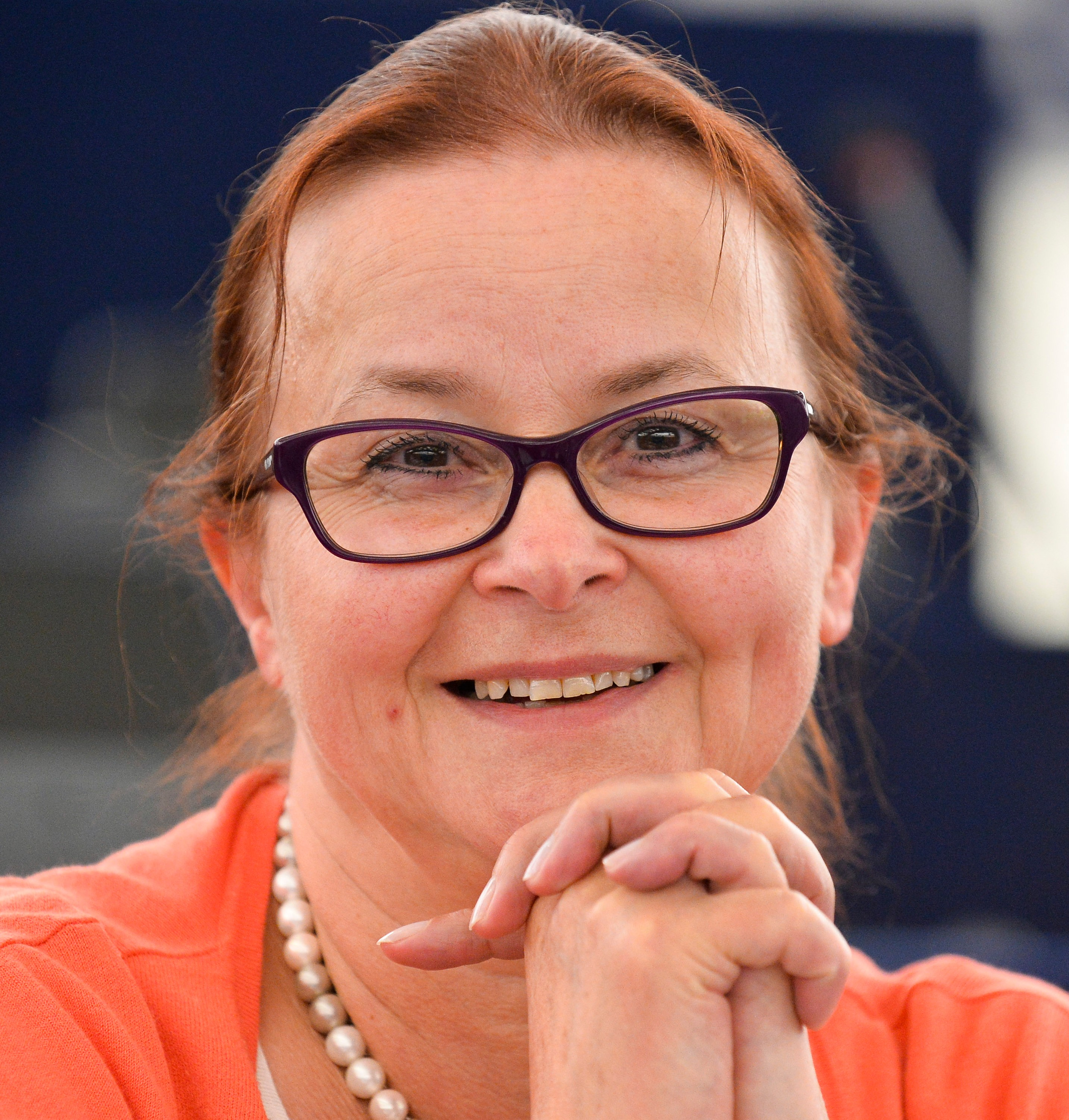

Member of the Sejm
- Incumbent
- Assumed office 13 December 2023
- Constituency: 21 – Opole
- In office 25 September 2005 – 10 June 2009

Member of the Senate
- In office 12 November 2019 – 12 November 2023

Member of the European Parliament
- In office 14 July 2009 – 2 July 2019

Personal details
- Born: 19 May 1957 (age 68) Opole, Poland
- Party: Civic Platform

Danuta Jazłowiecka (born 19 May 1957 in Opole) is a Polish politician. She was elected to the Sejm on 25 September 2005, getting 14,248 votes in 21 Opole district as a candidate from the Civic Platform list. In June 2009 she was elected as a Member of the European Parliament (MEP) from the Civic Platform list. She joined Group of the European People's Party (Christian Democrats) in European Parliament. She was re-elected in 2014.

== See also ==
- Members of Polish Sejm 2005-2007
- Members of the European Parliament for Poland 2009–14
- Members of the European Parliament for Poland 2014–19
