= Józef Pinior =

Polish politician

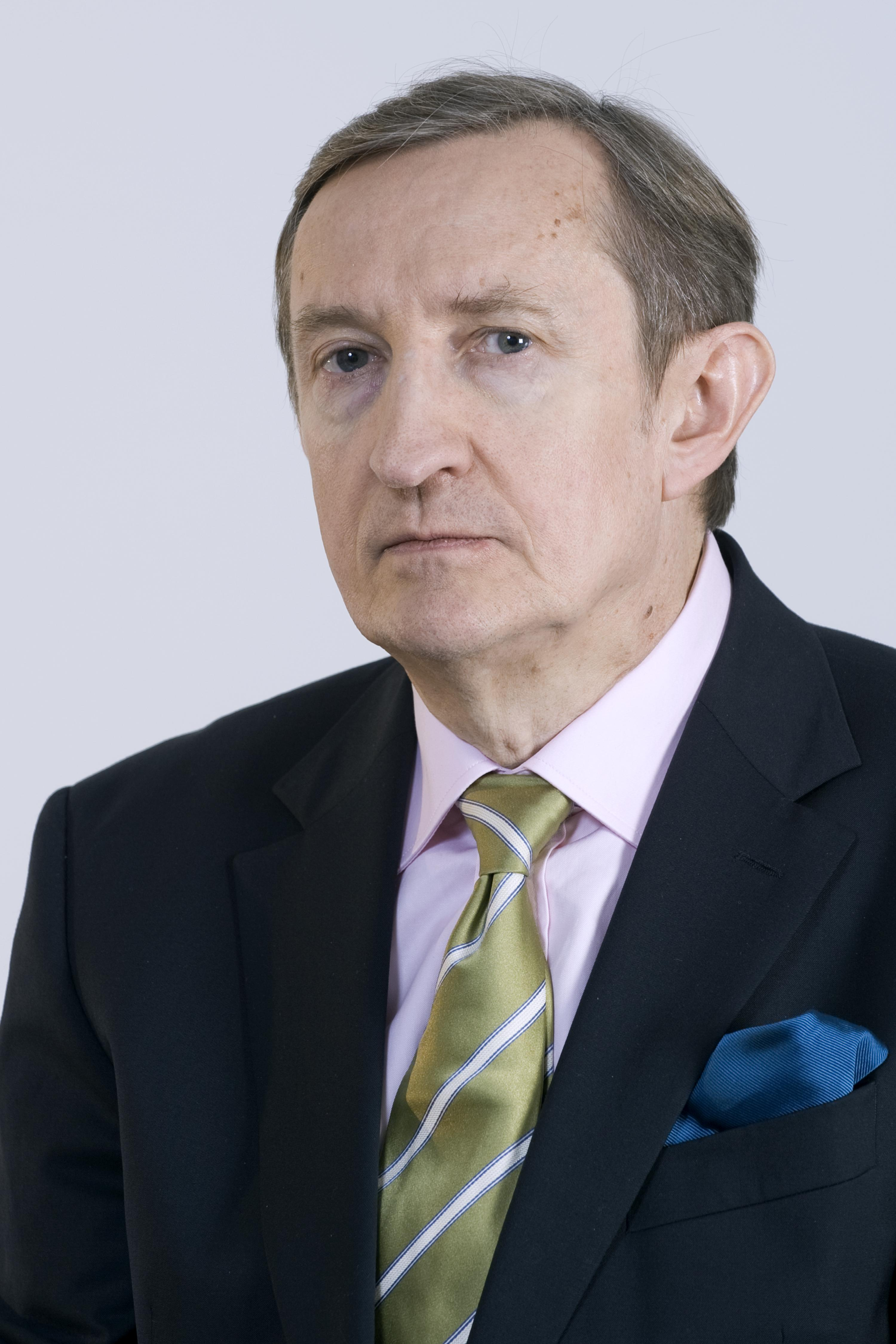
- Józef Pinior (2011)

Member of the European Parliament
- Constituency: Lower Silesian Voivodeship & Opole Voivodeship

Personal details
- Born: 9 March 1955 (age 71) Rybnik, Poland
- Party: Social Democracy of Poland
- Education: Wrocław University
- Occupation: Politician, Trade Unionist, Academic

Józef Pinior (Polish pronunciation: [ˈjuzɛf ˈpiɲɔr]; born on 9 March 1955 in Rybnik) is a Polish politician and Member of the European Parliament for the Lower Silesian Voivodship & Opole Voivodship with the Social Democracy of Poland, part of the Socialist Group and sits on the European Parliament's Committee on Development.

Pinior is a substitute for the Committee on Foreign Affairs and a member of the Delegation for relations with the United States.

Graduate of the Faculty of Law at Wrocław University (1978), he continued his education in the Postgraduate College of Ethics and History of Religions at Wrocław University (1980) and the School of the Social Science at the Polish Academy of Science Institute of Philosophy and Sociology in Warsaw (1996). He was a grant holder at the New School University in New York.

== Biography ==
In 1980–1989 Pinior was a trade unionist of the NSZZ "Solidarity". After the imposition of the Martial Law in Poland he became a leader of the Fighting Solidarity working in the underground. A leader of "RKS Solidarność" of Lower Silesia and a member of the underground national management of the union – Provisional Co-ordination Committee of the NSZZ "Solidarność"- and since 1986 public Provisional Board of the NSZZ "Solidarność".

He became famous for saving the trade union's 80 million zlotys from confiscation by the Security Service a few days before the imposing of the martial law in Poland. At that time he performed a duty of financial spokesman for the Union. Wanted after 13 December 1981, he lived in hiding. He was arrested, detained and imprisoned numerous times for his activity in the independent trade union in the years 1983–1988. He was called a prisoner of conscience by Amnesty International between 29 May 1984 and 21 August 1984. He was a co-originator of famous, underground Solidarność Radio.

From July 1987 Jozef Pinior was a spokesman for the Polish part of the Polish-Czech "Solidarność". During this time he took an active part in happenings of the Orange Alternative and he promoted this organization in independent and foreign media. In 1987 he was one of the co-originators of Polish Socialist Party. He was the vice-president for the Foreign Affairs in the Labour union in 1998–1999.

After 1989 Józef Pinior engaged in scientific research. His work concentrated on a comparative analysis of procedures of getting out of non-democratic regimes in South Europe, Latin America and Central Eastern Europe. In 1989, at labour organizations' invitation he conducted research in Brazil and Argentina. In 1990s he was a grant holder at the New School University in New York – his scientific program received the Democracy Fellowship from The Pew Charitable Trusts in the USA. On the basis of his experience at the New School he worked out a row of lectures concerning contemporary political systems, foreign affairs and European integration.

In 1992-1994 Pinior completed post-graduate work in Ethics and Religious Studies, at University of Wrocław and the Centre for Social Studies at the Institute of Philosophy and Sociology, Polish Academy of Sciences. Beginning in 1997, he was a lecturer in the Department of Philosophy and Social Communication at the Academy of Economy and in the School of Management and Finances in Wroclaw. From September 2002 he served as the Plenipotentiary of the Governor of the Lower Silesia for the European Referendum. From August 2003 the Plenipotentiary of the Governor of the Lower Silesia for European Issues.

On 29 November 2016 Józef Pinior was arrested by officers of Central Anti Corruption Bureau (pol. Centralne Biuro Antykorupcyjne) with group of other suspects. Prosecutor from State Prosecutor's Office charged him with corruption, to which he pled not guilty.

== Publications ==
- "Around political existentialism of Hannah Arendt" in: The Humanities (Nauki Humanistyczne), nr 3/1997, the Academy of Economy in Wroclaw;
- "Getting out of the authoritarianism in South Europe, Latin America and Middle-East Europe " in: Social Science. Research work at the Oscar Lange Academy of Economy in Wroclaw (Nauki Społeczne. Prace naukowe Akademii Ekonomicznej im. Oskara Langego we Wrocławiu), nr 685/1994;
- "Polonia: Crisis de transición" in: El socialismo en el Umbral del Siglo XXI, México, Universidad Autónoma Metropolitana, X 1991.
- 'Wychodzenie z autorytaryzmu w Europie Południowej, w Ameryce Łacińskiej oraz w Europie Środkowo-Wschodniej'

== See also ==
- 2004 European Parliament election in Poland
