= Grażyna Staniszewska =

Polish politician (born 1949)

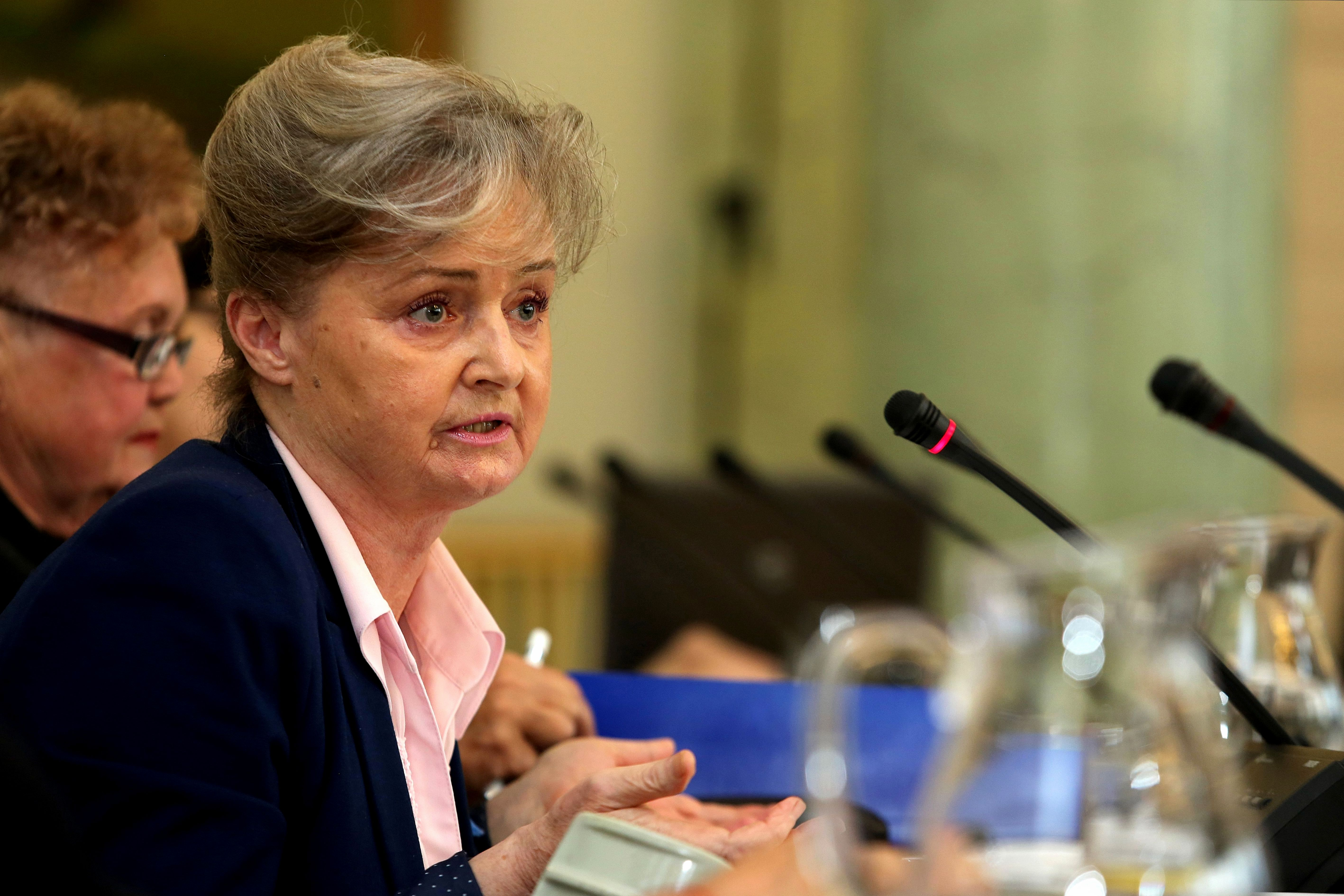
- Grażyna Staniszewska (2014)
- Born: 2 November 1949 (age 76); Biała Krakowska
- Occupation: Politician

Grażyna Ewa Staniszewska (born 2 November 1949) is a Polish politician and Member of the European Parliament for the Silesian Voivodeship with the Freedom Union, part of the Alliance of Liberals and Democrats for Europe and sits on the European Parliament's Committee on Regional Development.

Staniszewska is a substitute for the Committee on Culture and Education, a member of the Delegation to the EU-Ukraine Parliamentary Cooperation Committee and a substitute for the Delegation to the EU-Bulgaria Joint Parliamentary Committee.

== Education ==
- 1972: Polish scholar, graduate of Polish Philology at the Jagiellonian University

== Career ==
- 1982-1983: Teacher at the Bielsko-Biała grammar-school (1972-1974), head of the Bielsko-Biała Culture Club (1974-1980) and instructor
- since 1984: Researcher at the REDOR Research and Development Centre in Bielsko-Biała
- 1980-1981: Member of the administration and Podbeskidzie regional council of the independent, self-governing trade union NSZZ Solidarność
- 1981: Founder and head of the Podbeskidzia Open Education Agency
- 1983-1989: Interned under martial law (1981-1982) then arrested (1983), member of the underground authorities of NSZZ Solidarność
- 1988-1990: Member of the underground and subsequently legal National Executive Committee of NSZZ Solidarność
- since 1992: Member of the national authorities of the Democratic Union, then the Freedom Union
- 1989: Participant at the Round Table Conference
- 1989-2001: Member of Parliament of the Polish Republic
- 1997-2001: Chairman of the Parliamentary Committee on Education, Science and Youth
- 2001-2004: Senator of the Republic of Poland
- since 1996: Chairman of the Council of the Foundation for Economic Education in Warsaw
- 1998-: all-Poland coordinator of the programme for the preparation of youth for the information society 'Interkl@sa'

== Decorations ==
- Order of St. Stephen for the development of Polish-Hungarian cooperation
- Commander's Cross of the Order of Polonia Restituta (2011)

== Alleged collaboration with communist secret service ==
In 1992 she was accused by Antoni Macierewicz, then the Polish Minister of Internal Affairs of having collaborated with the communist-era secret services as a secret agent. She repeatedly denied the accusations and her name was eventually cleared by the Court of Appeal in Warsaw on 7 March 2000.

== See also ==
- 2004 European Parliament election in Poland
