= Marek Czarnecki =

Polish politician (born 1959)

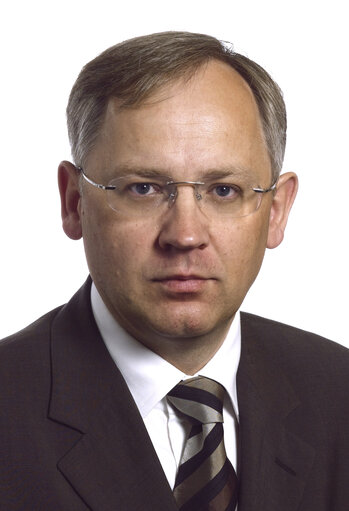

Member of the European Parliament
- In office 2004–2009

Personal details
- Born: Marek Aleksander Czarnecki; 22 March 1959 (age 67) Chorzów
- Occupation: Politician

Marek Aleksander Czarnecki (born 22 March 1959 in Chorzów) is a Polish politician and was from 2004 to 2009 a Member of the European Parliament (MEP) for the Masovian Voivodship with the Self-Defense, and was therefore a Non-Inscrit in the European Parliament.

Czarnecki sat on the Committee on Legal Affairs, and was a substitute for the Committee on Civil Liberties, Justice and Home Affairs and a member of the Delegation for relations with Israel. Chairman of the Group on South Asia - "South Asia Peace Forum" in the European Parliament.

Czarnecki is the co-founder of and current vice president of the Polish Unity Movement party.

== Education ==
- Master of Law from the Faculty of Law and Administration at the University of Warsaw (1986)
- 1983: graduate of the department of Journalism and Political Studies at the University of Warsaw

== Career ==
- 1989-1993: Articled to the bench (1986-1988), articled barrister
- 1997-1998: Voivode of the sub-region of Bialskopodlaski
- 1999-2000: Chairman RUCH S.A
- 2001: Vice-Chairman of the Military Property Agency
- Barrister with 'Czarnecki & Bagińska, Barristers and Legal Advisers' sp.k

== See also ==
- 2004 European Parliament election in Poland
