= Wiesław Kuc =

Polish politician

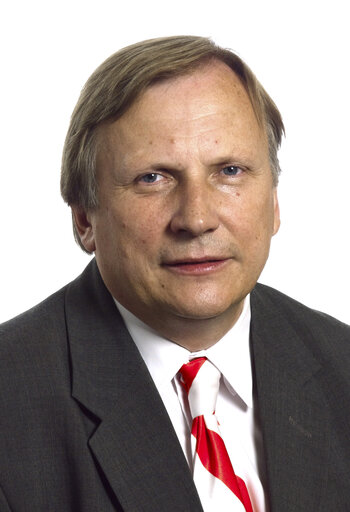
Kuc in 2012

Wiesław Stefan Kuc (born 2 September 1949 in Sokołów Podlaski) is a Polish politician and Member of the European Parliament (MEP) for LU, is the economist and agriculture expert of EP delegation of Self-Defense and sits on the European Parliament's Committee on Budgets.

Initially, he was a non-attached like the other members of his party, but on 1 December 2004, he joined the Socialist Group together with Bogdan Golik. He rejoined his Samoobrona colleagues in the Union for Europe of the Nations group in December 2006, leaving Golik alone with the Socialists.

Kuc is a substitute for the Committee on Agriculture and Rural Development and a member of the Delegation to the EU-Bulgaria Joint Parliamentary Committee.

== See also ==
- 2004 European Parliament election in Poland
