= Bogusław Rogalski =

Polish politician

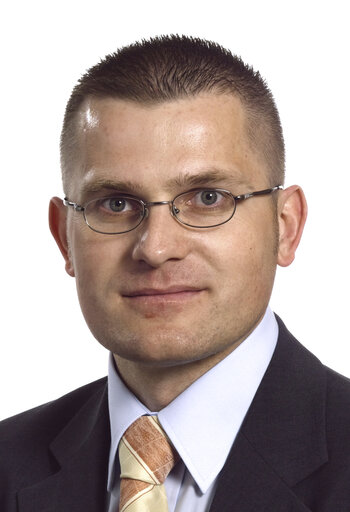

Chairman of the Olsztyn district of All-Polish Youth
- Party Leader
- In office 1993–1997

Member of the Polish-American Historical Association
- Incumbent
- Assumed office 2001

Honorary Chairman of the Association for Polish Children of War
- Incumbent
- Assumed office 2003

Chairman of the Warmian-Masurian district League of Polish Families
- In office 2003–2005

Regional Councillor in the Warmian-Masurian Voivodeship
- In office 2003–2005

Member of the LPR Policy Council
- In office 2003–2005

Chairman of the LPR Union of Councillors
- In office 2003–2005

Member of the European Parliament
- In office 2004–2009

Press Secretary and co-founder of Forward Poland
- In office 2008–2010

Leader of Union of Christian Families
- Incumbent
- Assumed office 2015

Personal details
- Born: March 11, 1972 (age 54) Maków Mazowiecki
- Citizenship: Polish
- Party: Union Of Christian Families
- Other political affiliations: Confederation
- Education: Olsztyn Pedagogical University

Bogusław Rogalski (born 11 March 1972) is a Polish far-right politician and the current leader of Union of Christian Families.

He graduated in 1997 from the Olsztyn Pedagogical University. As a student, between 1993 and 1997 he was chairman of the Olsztyn district of All-Polish Youth, and member of the National Party in the same district. he became a member of the Polish-American Historical Association in 2001 and since 2003 is an Honorary Chairman of the Association for Polish Children of War.

He then joined the League of Polish Families, where he played several key roles. He was elected regional councillor in the Warmian-Masurian Voivodeship, was a member of the party's Policy Council, chairman of the party's Union of Councillors and Warmian-Masurian district branch.

having been elected in the 2004 European Parliament election in Poland, until 2009 he was a Member of the European Parliament (MEP) for the Podlasie and Warmian-Masurian voivodships in the north-east of Poland. He represented the League of Polish Families and was in the Alliance of a Europe for the Nations Group, he sat on the European Parliament's Committee on International Trade. Rogalski was also a substitute for the Committee on Foreign Affairs and a member of the Delegation for relations with the countries of the Andean Community.

He left LPR in 2005, went on to co-find a new political party, Forward Poland, which existed for two years until 2010. In 2009 he was a candidate for the mayor of Olsztyn in the by-election where he received 4% of the vote.

In 2015 he became chairman and co-founded the Union of Christian Families political party.
