= Wojciech Wierzejski =

Polish politician

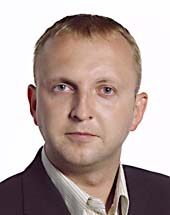
- Born: 6 September 1976 (age 49), Biała Podlaska, Poland

Wojciech Wierzejski (pronounced [ˈvɔjt͡ɕɛɣ vjɛˈʐɛjskʲi]; born 6 September 1976 in Biała Podlaska) is a former Polish politician and former Member of the European Parliament (MEP) for Warsaw with the League of Polish Families, part of the Independence and Democracy group, and sits on the European Parliament's Committee on Constitutional Affairs.

Wierzejski was a substitute for the Committee on Culture and Education and a member of the Delegation for relations with Belarus.

One month before the 2006 Warsaw LGBT parade, he remarked: "If the deviants will start demonstrating, they need to be bashed with a thick stick." He specifically threatened German politicians who might join the march. These comments caused public focus in Poland and throughout Europe.

== Education ==
- 2000: Master of Philosophy and Sociology, University of Warsaw

== Career ==
- 2002–2004: Councillor and Vice-marshal of the Voivodship of Mazowsze
- 2004: Treasurer of the League of Polish Families

== See also ==
- 2004 European Parliament election in Poland
