= Genowefa Grabowska =

Polish politician

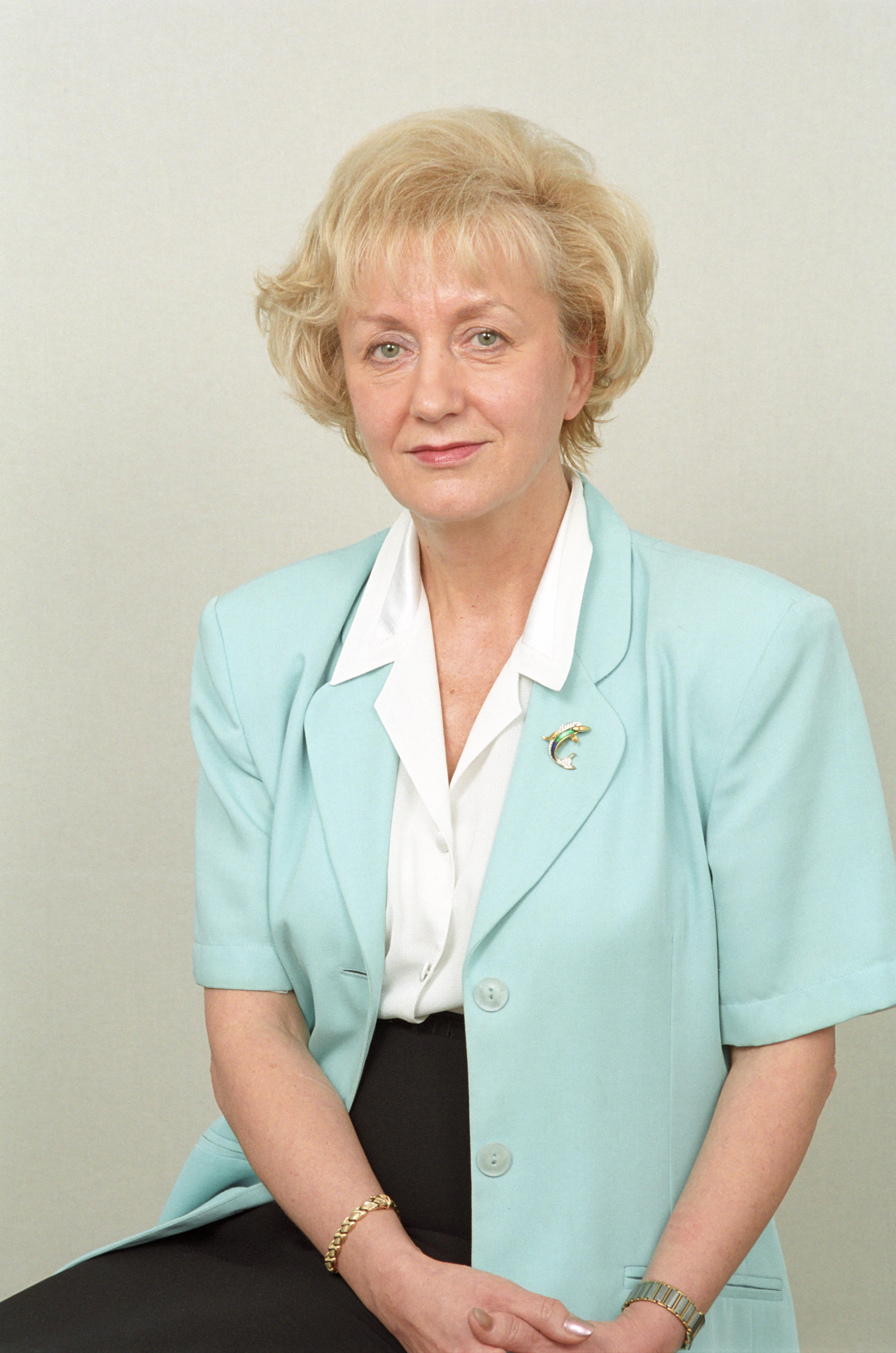

Genowefa Grabowska (born 1 January 1944, in Przystajń) is a Polish politician and Member of the European Parliament for the Silesian Voivodship with the Social Democracy of Poland, part of the Socialist Group and sits on the European Parliament's Committee on Constitutional Affairs.

Grabowska is a substitute for the Committee on the Environment, Public Health and Food Safety.

== Education ==
- 1972: Doctor of Law
- 1980: assistant professor

== Career ==
- since 1991: professor
- from 1993-1996: head of the Department of International and European Law at the University of Silesia in Katowice, Dean of Faculty
- Author of a number of publications including Diplomatic Law, Environmental Law and European law among others
- Senator of the Republic of Poland, Chairman of the Senate Committee on Foreign Affairs and European Integration, Chairman of the Polish delegation to the Western European Union Parliamentary Assembly
- 1999-2001: Member of the Legal Advisory Committee to the Minister of Foreign Affairs of the Republic of Poland
- 2004: Observer to and then Member of the EP (from 1 May to 19 July
- 2002-2003: Representative of the Polish Parliament at the European Convention
- since 2001: Deputy Arbitrator at the Court of Conciliation and Arbitration of the Conference on Security and Cooperation in Europe
- 2002: Polish delegate to the Sixth (Legal) Committee of the session of the UN General Assembly
- Member of the International Law Association in London

== Decorations ==
- Silver and Gold Cross of Merit, Officer's Cross of the Order of Poland Reborn, National Education Medal

== See also ==
- 2004 European Parliament election in Poland
