= Urszula Krupa =

Polish politician (born 1949)

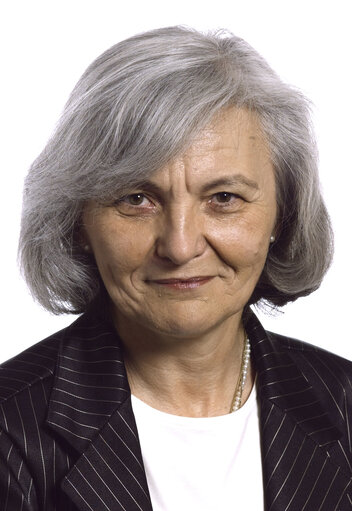

Personal details
- Born: Urszula Irena Krupa; 20 October 1949 (age 76) Łódź, Republic of Poland
- Party: League of Polish Families
- Occupation: Politician

Urszula Irena Krupa (born 20 October 1949) is a Polish politician and former Member of the European Parliament (MEP) for the Łódź Voivodeship with the League of Polish Families, part of the Independence and Democracy and sat on the European Parliament's Committee on Women's Rights and Gender Equality and its Committee on the Environment, Public Health and Food Safety.

Krupa was also a member of the Delegation for relations with South Africa and a substitute for the Delegation to the EU-Mexico Joint Parliamentary Committee.

== Education ==
- 1984: Physician (1973), specialisation in Anaesthesiology and Resuscitation 1st stage (1977), 2nd stage (1984), Doctor of Medicine at the Medical Academy of Łódz
- 1994: Post-graduate Catholic studies in journalism at the Catholic Broadcasting organisation 'Radio Maryja'
- 2003: Editor at Radio Maryja in Toruń (1995), lecturer at the Higher College of Social and Media Culture in Toruń
- Assistant (1975) tutor (1986) lecturer (2001) Łódz Medical Academy
- 2003: Chairman of the Voivodship Administration of the League of Polish Families

== Career ==
- 2001-2004: Member of Parliament of the Polish Republic

== See also ==
- 2004 European Parliament election in Poland
