= Leopold Rutowicz =

Polish politician (1932–2025)

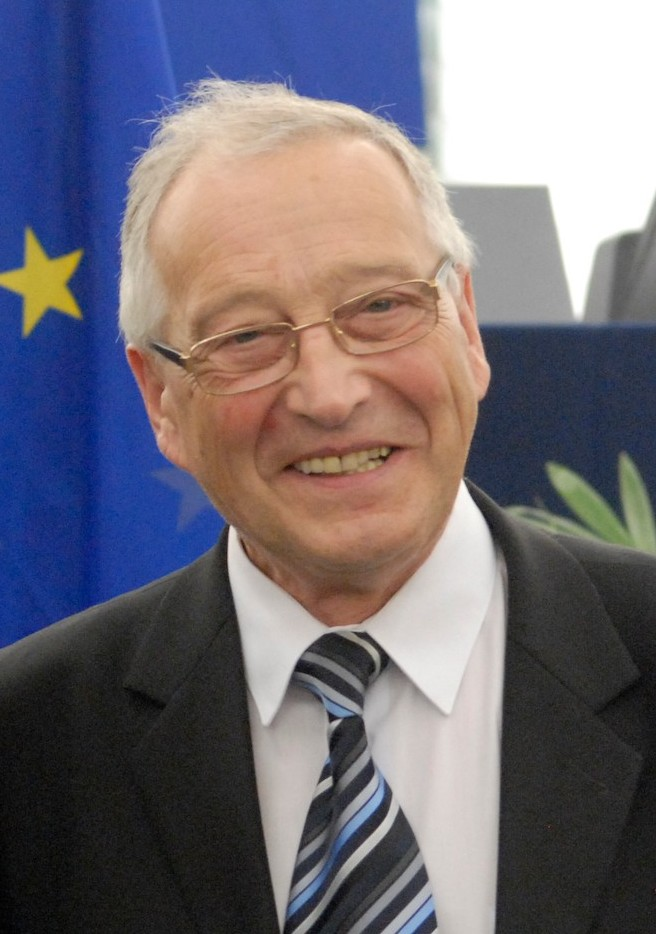
Image of Leopold Rutowicz

Leopold Józef Rutowicz (18 October 1932 – 28 June 2025) was a Polish politician who was a Member of the European Parliament (MEP) for the MP & SW with the Self-Defense, and was therefore a Non-Inscrit in the European Parliament.

== Life and career ==
Rutowicz was born in Kraków on 18 October 1932. He sat on its Committee on the Internal Market and Consumer Protection, and was a substitute for the Committee on Employment and Social Affairs, as well as a member of the Delegation for relations with Australia and New Zealand. Rutowicz died on 28 June 2025, at the age of 92.

== Education ==
- 1956: Master of Engineering, University of Mining and Metallurgy (AGH)
- 1981: doctor of commodities science at the academy of Economics in Kraków

== Career ==
- 1955-1968: Assistant and lecturer at AGH
- 1957-1959: Senior technologist at the Fabryka Wyrobów Blaszanych (Tin Products Factory)
- 1957-1963: chief mechanic at the Kraków Enterprise for General Construction
- 1959-1990: Member of the Administration and Chairman of the Voivodeship Club for Technical Improvement and Innovation (Klub Racjonalizacji i Wynalazczości)
- 1963-1967: head of the Ośrodek Prototypów Zakładu Badań i Doświadczeń Budownictwa (Prototype Centre of the Institute for Building Research and Testing)
- 1967-1990: Deputy director and director of the Regional Office of Weights and Measures
- 1967-1993: Member of the Administration and Chairman of the Association of Polish Engineers and Technicians, Kraków branch
- 1990-1995: director of the Assay Office of Kraków

== Decorations ==
- 1977: Gold Cross of Merit
- 1984: Knight's Cross - 'Polonia Restituta'

== See also ==
- 2004 European Parliament election in Poland
