= Bogdan Golik =

Polish politician (born 1963)

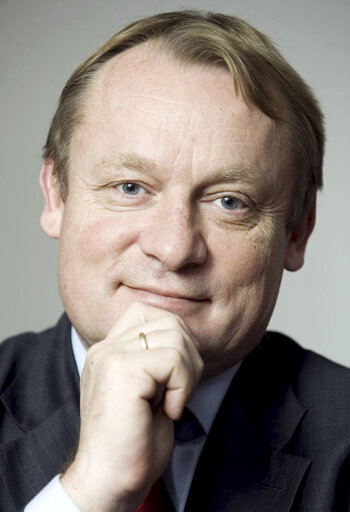
Image of Bogdan Golik

Bogdan Dariusz Golik (born 19 March 1963 in Wrocław) is a Polish politician and former member of the European Parliament for LD with the Self-Defense and sits on the European Parliament's Committee on Agriculture and Rural Development.

Before being elected to the European Parliament, he was animal doctor and business advisor.

Initially, he was a non-attached like the other members of his party, but on 1 December 2004, he joined the Socialist Group together with Wiesław Kuc.

He is also a member of the delegation for relations with the countries of South Asia and the South Asia Association for Regional Cooperation (SAARC).

== Allegations of rape, removal of immunity ==
In December 2005 Golik was accused of raping a Brussels prostitute. Golik claims that he is the victim of a conspiracy. He said the incident is just a provocation resulting from, among the others, actions undertaken by him against the Russia to Germany gas pipeline. On the demand of Golik, the Belgian prosecutor’s office asked the European Parliament to strip Golik of his immunity. On October 3, the Legal Commission of the European Parliament made a decision about stripping Bogdan Golik, a Polish member of the European Parliament, of his immunity. "I'm glad that I will finally be able to testify and defend myself, which would be impossible in case of my being protected by the immunity" – said Golik. He emphasized that he himself asked the Legal Commission to strip him of the immunity. In November 2008 the royal prosecutor stated that Golik is innocent and there is no evidence against him.

== Career ==
- since 1998: vice-chairman of the Polish Chamber of Commerce (PCC), officer and committee member of the PCC (since 1998), founder and vice-chairman of the Polish-American Chamber of Commerce (since 2001)
- 2002-2004: founder and vice-chairman of the Polish-Arab Chamber of Commerce
- since 1991: co-founder and chairman of the Regional Chamber of Commerce in Leszno
- since 1991: member of the board of directors of the Polish Foundation for the Promotion and Development of Small and Medium-sized Enterprises
- since 2007: board member of the Europe-India Chamber of Commerce (EICC)
- since 2008: honour member of the Belgian-China Chamber of Commerce
- He actively has promoted European and Asian economic and business relations and specializes in EU–China relations for many years.
- Since 2009: president of the China Institute in Poland,
- Since 2009: global vice chairman of Asia-Pacific CEO Association, Worldwide (APCEO)

== See also ==
- 2004 European Parliament election in Poland
