= Jan Masiel =

Polish politician

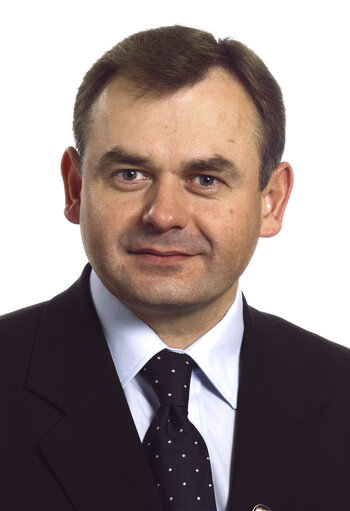

Jan Tadeusz Masiel (born 28 March 1963 in Siemiatycze) is a Polish politician. In the years 2004-2009 he was a Member of the European Parliament (MEP) for the Greater Poland Voivodship with the Self-Defense, a Non-Inscrit in the European Parliament.

Masiel was in a Committee on Employment and Social Affairs, and was a substitute for the Committee on Petitions and the Committee on the Environment, Public Health and Food Safety. Masiel was also a member of the Delegation to the EU-Romania Joint Parliamentary Committee.

== Education ==
- Master of Psychology, Catholic University of Lublin (KUL)(1987)
- 1993: Diploma in teaching French language from the Alliance Française, Brussels
- 1997: Certificate of completion of a three-year programme in psychoanalytical psychotherapy with the Conseil de Formation Continue en Psychiatrie (CFCP) at the University of Louvain-la-Neuve

== Career ==
- 1990-1991: Traineeship in psychoanalytical psychiatry at the 'La Borde' Clinic, France
- Sociotherapist at the Les Tropiques Institute A.S.B.L
- 1992-1997: in Brussels
- Self-employed in Brussels
- 2004-2007: Member of 'Self-defence of the Polish Republic'

== See also ==
- 2004 European Parliament election in Poland
