= Zdzisław Chmielewski =

Polish politician and historian

Zdzisław Kazimierz Chmielewski (born 4 October 1942 in Falborz) is a Polish historian, rector of Szczecin University, Member of the European Parliament (MEP) (elected on 13 June 2004).

== See also ==
- 2004 European Parliament election in Poland
