= Filip Kaczmarek (politician) =

Polish politician (born 1966)

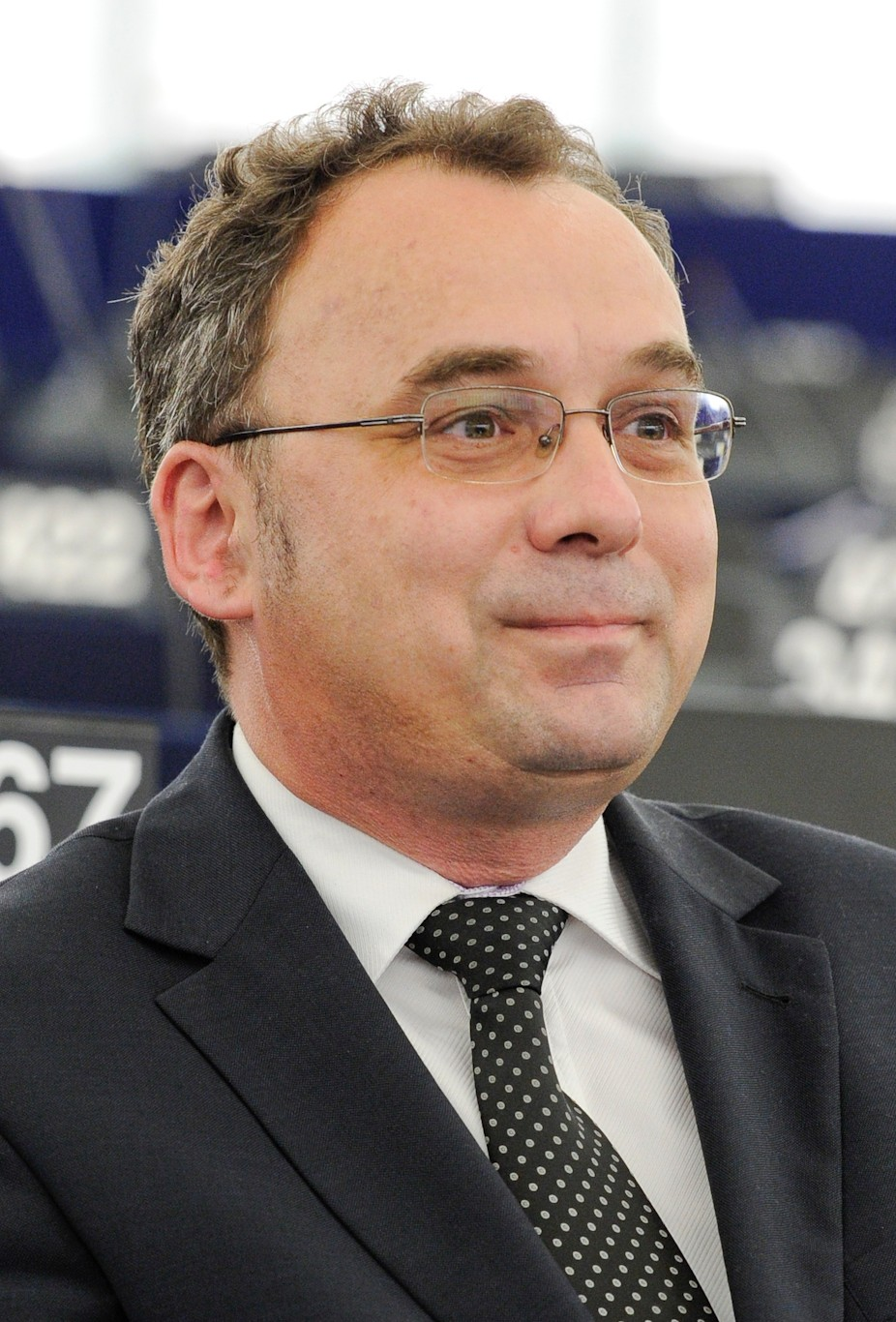

Member of the European Parliament
- Incumbent
- Assumed office 2009-07-14

Personal details
- Born: 22 July 1966 (age 59) Poznań, Poland
- Party: Civic Platform, European People's Party
- Website: www.filipkaczmarek.pl

Filip Andrzej Kaczmarek (born 22 November 1966 in Poznań) is a Polish politician and Member of the European Parliament.

== Early life ==
Kaczmarek was born in Poznań. He graduated from the History Department at Adam Mickiewicz University in Poznań. In 2005 he earned a PhD in Political Sciences at Adam Mickiewicz University. His wife Beata Machowska-Kaczmarek is a journalist and his son is Ignacy.

== Career ==
In the beginning of the 90’s he chaired the National Coordination Committee for the Independent Students’ Union at Adam Mickiewicz University. In 1994 Kaczmarek took part in the foundation of the Young Democrats Association. As a member of the Sejm (1991–1993) he was inter alia a member of the Parliamentary Committee on the Europe Agreement. In 2001 he took part in founding the Civic Platform in Poznań. He was a co-founder of the Civic Platform Councillors Club of Poznań City Council and the Civic Platform structures in Poznań. From 1998 to 2002 Kaczmarek was the Councillor and Deputy Leader of Poznań City Council. In 2003 he created the European Funds Bureau in Poznań City Council becoming its first director. In 2010 he became head of Civic Platform in Poznań.

=== Europe ===
Kaczmarek was a member of the Sejm in 1992. He postulated that Poland should apply for complete membership in the European Community. In 1993 he was a co-founder of an organisation that later transformed into the Centre for European Research and Education in Poznań. In 1996 Kaczmarek was a co-initiator of International Youth Centre in Mikuszewo. Until 2007 he was the Chairman of the Independent Initiatives Association. The Association organized among other things the European Youth Meeting (Poznań 2003). In 1996 he received a scholarship from The German Marshall Fund.

=== European Parliament ===
In 2004 Kaczmarek became a Member of the European Parliament. He adheres to the European People's Party like other Civic Party MEPs. He is the Coordinator of EPP Group in the Committee on Development that brings help to developing countries and supports democratic transformations there. Kaczmarek is also a member of the Committee on Agriculture and Rural Development where he is mostly concerned with the Polish agriculture. In 2009 his work in the Committee on Development was appreciated and he received an award as best MEP in the category of development politics. He is a member of the Delegation for Relations with the Pan-African Parliament, the Delegation to the ACP-EU Joint Parliamentary Assembly and a deputy member of the Delegation for relations with Israel.

Filip Kaczmarek is a member of 5 intergroups:

- Tibet Intergroup
- Intergroup on Ageing
- Sport Intergroup
- Urban Intergroup
- SME Intergroup

He belongs to the following Parliamentary Groups:

- EP Caucus on Burma
- The Association of European Parliamentarians with Africa –AWEPA
- EP Taiwan Friendship Group
- EP Rugby Union Intergroup
- EP Beer Club
- The European Advocates for Epilepsy Working Group
- EP Working Group on Roma-people
- EU-Nepal Friendship Group

In the EPP Group he is:

- Member of the Political Bureau of the European People's Party
- Member of the EPP Management Board Bureau
- Coordinator of the Committee on Development
- Coordinator of ACP-EU Joint Parliamentary Assembly
- Member of SME Circle that concerns small and medium-sized enterprises (the EPP Group is the only EP Party that entirely recognises SME’s role in providing workplaces in Europe)

== See also ==
- 2004 European Parliament election in Poland
