= Dariusz Grabowski =

Polish politician (born 1950)

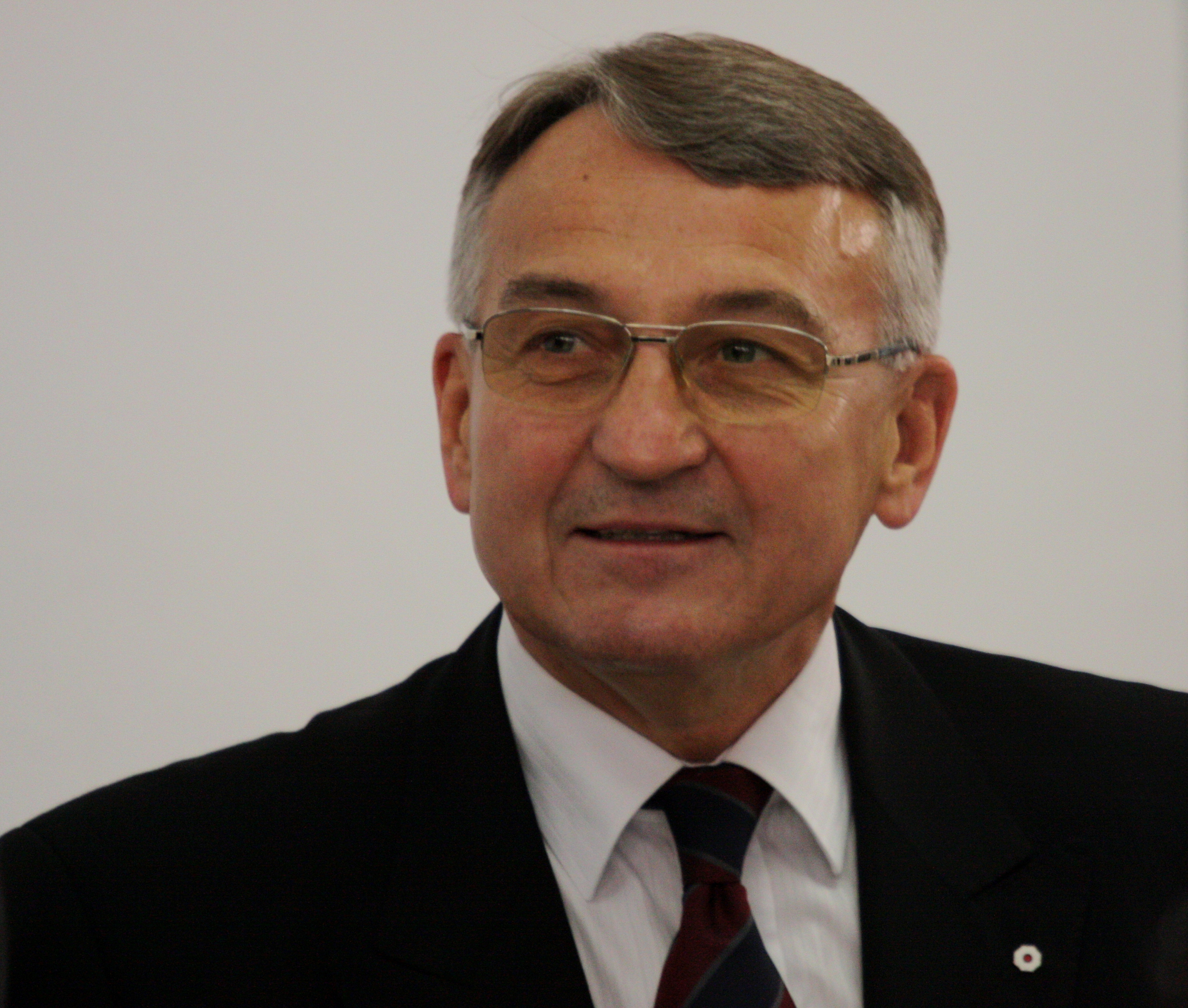
Dariusz Grabowski (2007)

Dariusz Maciej Grabowski (born 28 August 1950 in Warsaw) is a Polish politician and former Member of the European Parliament (MEP) for the Masovian Voivodship with the League of Polish Families, part of the Union for Europe of the Nations Group and sits on the European Parliament's Committee on Budgets.

Grabowski is a substitute member on the European Parliament's Committee on Budgetary Control and the Committee on Economic and Monetary Affairs.

He was awarded a master's degree in economics in 1973, and achieved a Doctorate in Economics from the University of Warsaw in 1978.

== Career ==
- 1973-1999: Researcher, Department of Economics, University of Warsaw
- 1989-1997: own business
- 1999-2000: Member of the Parliament of the Republic of Poland, terms 1997–2001, 2001–2004, Chairman of the Committee on Cooperative Banks
- 2003-2004: Member of the Council of Europe
- 2003-2004: Vice-Chairman of the Central Council of the League of Polish Families
- 2004: Vice-Chairman of the Committee for Social Legislation

== See also ==
- 2004 European Parliament election in Poland
