= Stanisław Jałowiecki =

Polish politician (born 1946)

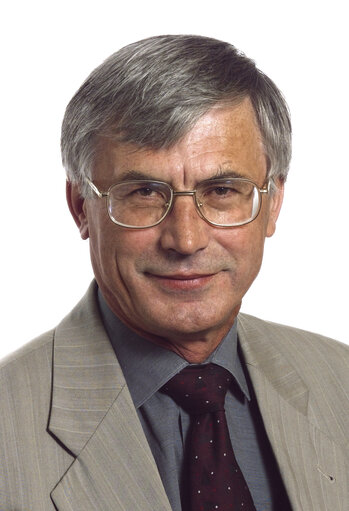
Image of Stanisław Jałowiecki

Stanisław Jałowiecki (born 26 December 1946 in Tanvald) is a Polish politician and Member of the European Parliament for the Lower Silesian Voivodship & Opole Voivodship with the Civic Platform, part of the European People's Party and sits on the European Parliament's Committee on Transport and Tourism.

Jałowiecki is a substitute for the Committee on Regional Development and a member of the Delegation to the EU-Turkey Joint Parliamentary Committee.

== Education ==
- 1970: Master of Sociology Jagiellonian University, Kraków (UJ)
- 1975: Doctor of Humanities, UJ

== Career ==
- 1970-1975: Lecturing at the Silesian Technical University, Gliwice
- 1997-1998: the Institute of Sociology and Demography at the Śląsk Institute, Opole (1975-1981
- 1984-1996: Free-lance journalist in U.S., journalist and deputy director for Radio Free Europe in Munich (1985-1994) and Warsaw
- since 2000: Researcher at the Silesian University
- 1981-1983: Chairman of the Regional Administration and member of the National Committee of 'Solidarność'
- 1998-2002: Marshal of the Opole Voivodship
- since 2003: Vice-chairman of the Mountain Areas Association

== See also ==
- 2004 European Parliament election in Poland
