= Zbigniew Zaleski =

Polish politician (1947–2019)

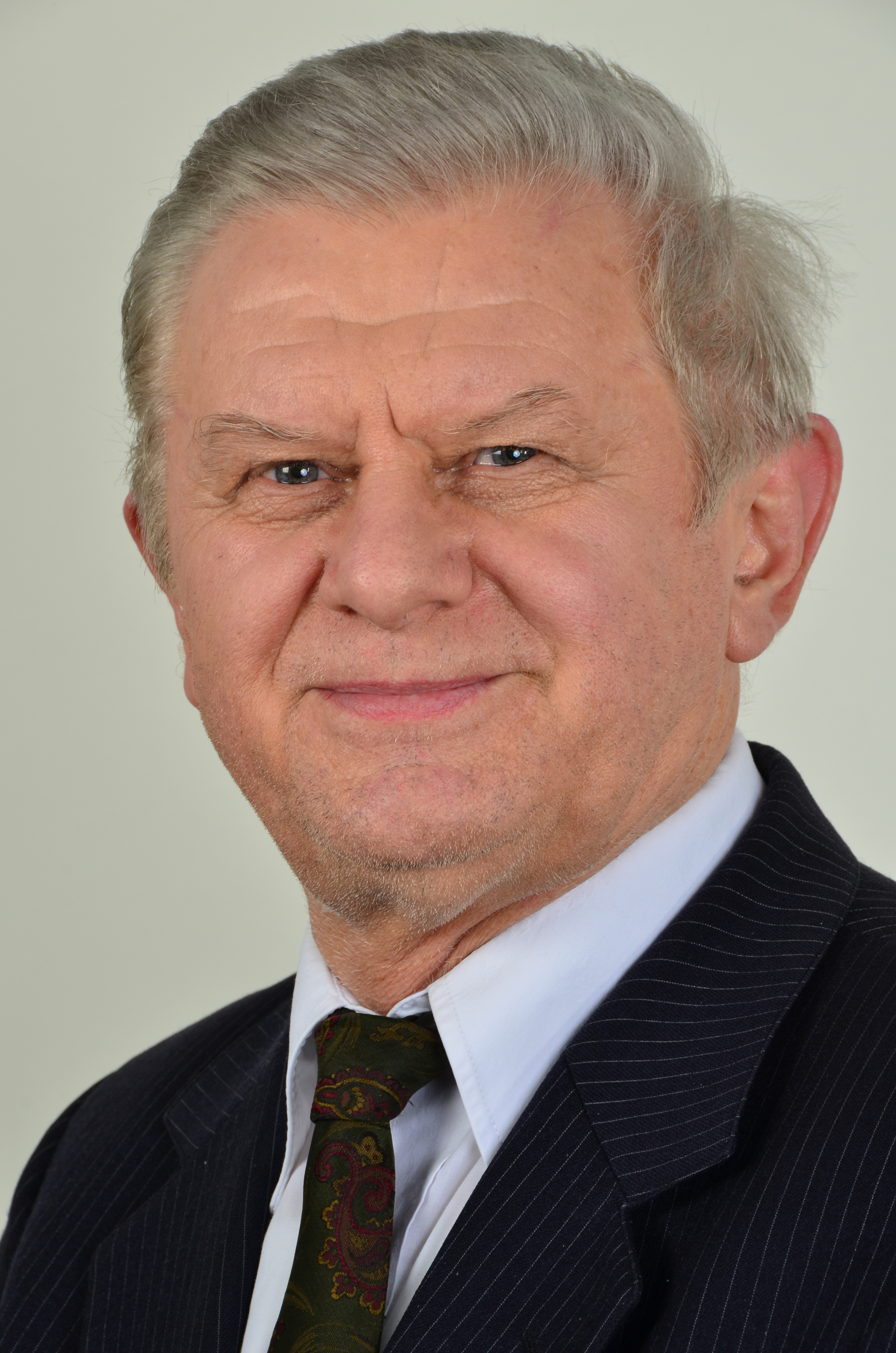
- Zaleski in 2014

Member of the European Parliament
- In office 20 July 2004 – 1 July 2014
- Constituency: Lublin

Personal details
- Born: 29 April 1947; Rogoziniec, Poland
- Died: 31 August 2019 (aged 72)
- Political party: Civic Platform

Zbigniew Zaleski (29 April 1947 – 31 August 2019) was a Polish politician who was a Member of the European Parliament (MEP) from 2004 to 2014, representing Lublin. He was a member of the Civic Platform, part of the European People's Party and sat on the European Parliament's Committee on International Trade.

Zaleski was a substitute for the Committee on Development and a member of the Delegation for relations with Israel.

== Education ==
- 1994: Masters (1972), Doctorate (1978) and titular professor of Psychology

== Career ==
- since 1974: School psychologist (1973–1974) and lecturer at the John Paul II Catholic University of Lublin
- 2002-2004: Regional Councillor of the Voivodship of Lublin
- since 1992: Member of the American Psychological Association
- since 2003: Founder and Chairman of the European Cooperation Association

== See also ==
- 2004 European Parliament election in Poland
