= Bogdan Pęk =

Polish politician

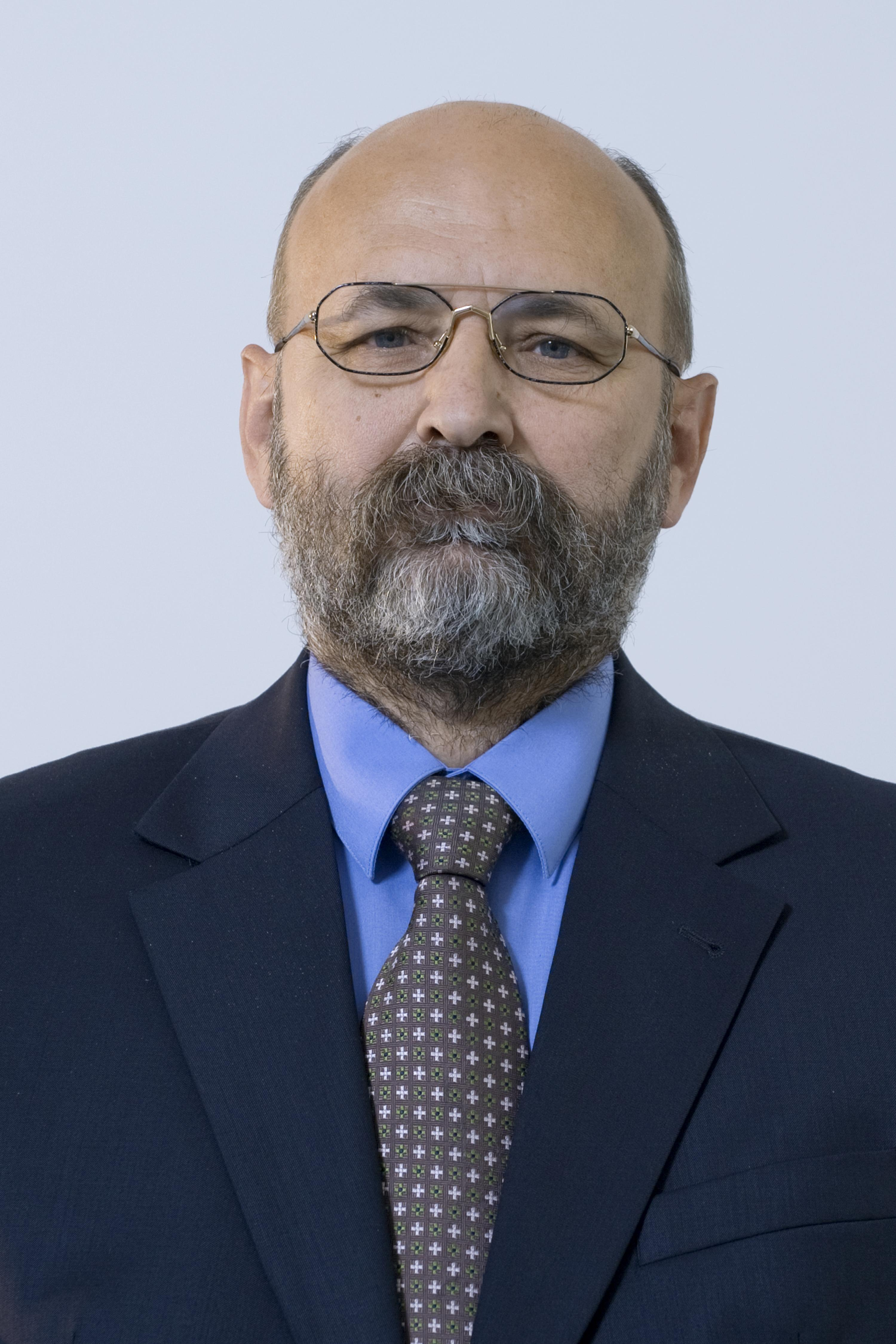

Personal details
- Born: April 8, 1953 (age 72); Kraków, Poland
- Political party: Law and Justice

Bogdan Marek Pęk ([ˈbɔɡdan ˈpɛ̃k], born on 8 April 1953 in Kraków) is a Polish politician and Member of the European Parliament (MEP) for the Lesser Poland Voivodeship & Swietokrzyskie Voivodeship with the League of Polish Families, part of the Independence and Democracy and sits on the European Parliament's Committee on Civil Liberties, Justice and Home Affairs.

Pęk is a substitute for the Committee on Agriculture and Rural Development, a member of the Delegation for relations with the People's Republic of China and a substitute for the Delegation for relations with Belarus.

== Education ==
- 1979: Graduate of the Agricultural Academy of Kraków
- 1996: Course for members of the Treasury Management Supervisory Councils

== Career ==
- 1980–1985: Factory farm manager
- 1985–1990: Chairman of the Organisation of Farmers' Cooperatives
- 1980–1984: Vice-Chairman of the independent, self-governing trade union NSZZ Solidarność to the Regional Enterprise for the Meat Industry (OPPM)
- 1990–1992: Secretary (1990–1992) and Chairman of the Voivodeship Administration of the Polish Peasant Party (PSL) in Kraków
- 1996–1997: Vice-Chairman of the National Administration of the PSL
- 1988–2003: Member of the High Council of the PSL
- since 2003: Vice-Chairman of the board of the League of Polish Families
- 1986–1990: Councillor of the commune ('gmina') of Zielonka
- Member of Parliament of the Republic of Poland
- 1993–1994: Chairman of the Committee on Privatisation
- 1995–1997: Chairman of the Committee on Inspections
- 1997–2001: Vice-Chairman of the Treasury Committee and on affairs of the Institute of National Remembrance
- 1997–2003: Vice-Chairman of the PSL Parliamentary Union
- 1994: Member of the Polish Angling Association (1970) and the Polish Hunting Association

== Decorations ==
- 1986: Bronze Cross of Merit

== See also ==
- 2004 European Parliament election in Poland
