= Mieczysław Janowski =

Polish politician (born 1947)

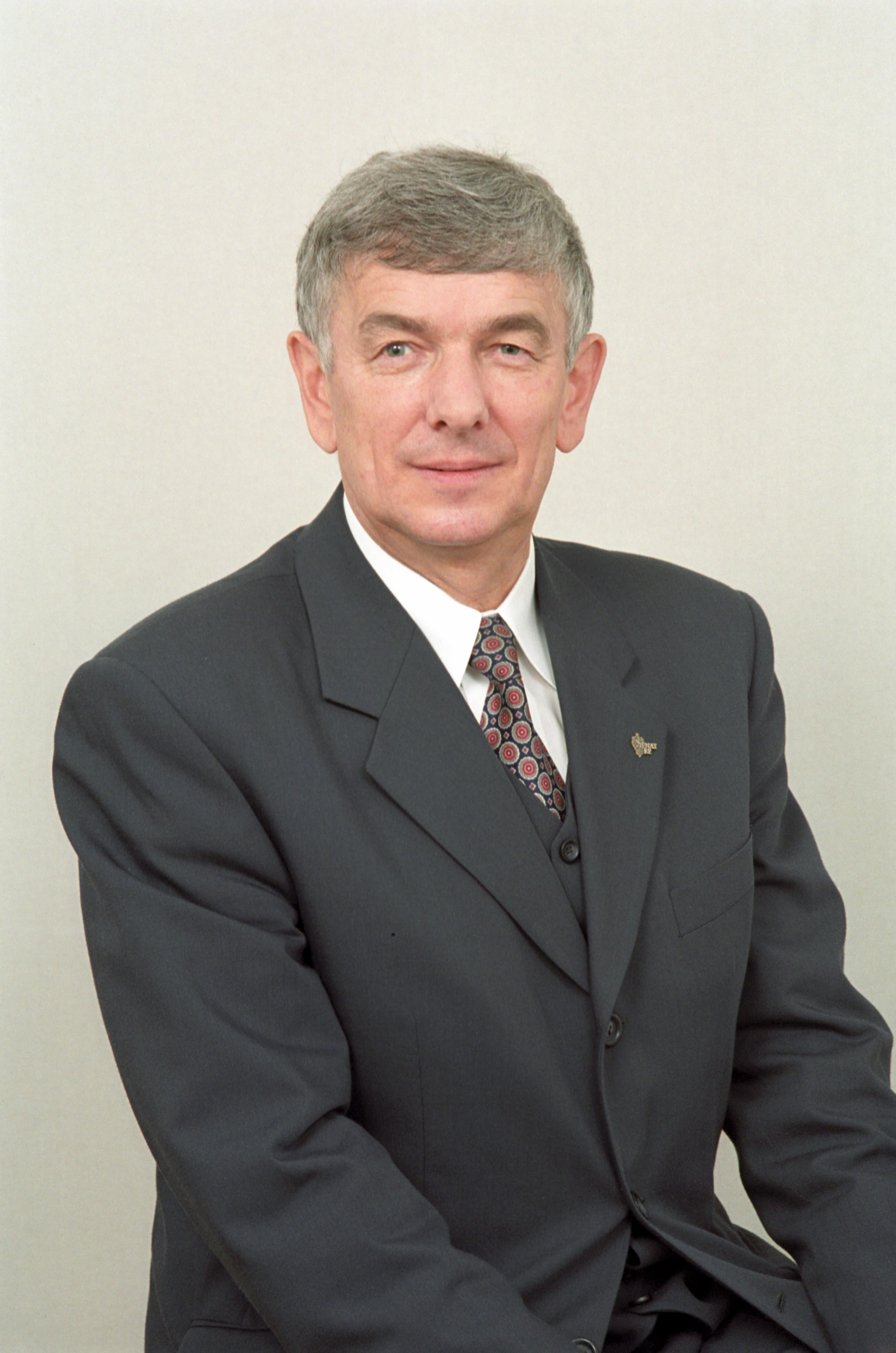
Mieczysław Janowski

Mieczysław Edmund Janowski (born 16 November 1947 in Zduńska Wola) is a Polish politician and Member of the European Parliament (MEP) for the Subcarpathian Voivodship with the Law and Justice, part of the Union for a Europe of Nations. He sits on the European Parliament's Committee on Regional Development.

Janowski is a substitute for the Committee on Industry, Research and Energy and the Committee on Petitions. Janowski is also a member of the Delegation for relations with Switzerland, Iceland and Norway and to the European Economic Area (EEA) Joint Parliamentary Committee.

== Education ==
- 1972: Master's in Engineering Warsaw University of Technology
- graduate of the Dept
- 1972: of Pedagogy, Warsaw University of Technology
- 1980: Doctor of Engineering, Rzeszów University of Technology

== Career ==
- 1972-1973: Design specialist at WSK PZL - Rzeszów
- 1973-1982: Lecturer at the Rzeszów University of Technology
- since 1980: Member of the independent self-governing trade union NSZZ Solidarność
- 1998-2003: Member of Solidarity Election Action - Social Movement (RS AWS)
- 1990-1998: Councillor
- 1991-1999: Mayor of Rzeszów
- 2001-2004: Senator of the Republic of Poland, chairman of the Committee for Territorial Autonomy and State Administration, member of the Committee on National Economy (1997-2001), vice-chairman Committee for Territorial Autonomy and State Administration, member of the Committee on Environmental Protection
- 1994-1998: Delegate to the Local Chamber of the Congress of Local and Regional Authorities of the Council of Europe
- Member of the Association of Polish Engineers and Mechanical Technicians
- Member of the National League, Catholic Action, Polish Community

== Decorations ==
- Bronze Cross of Merit

== See also ==
- 2004 European Parliament election in Poland
