= Sylwester Chruszcz =

Polish politician

Sylwester Arkadiusz Chruszcz
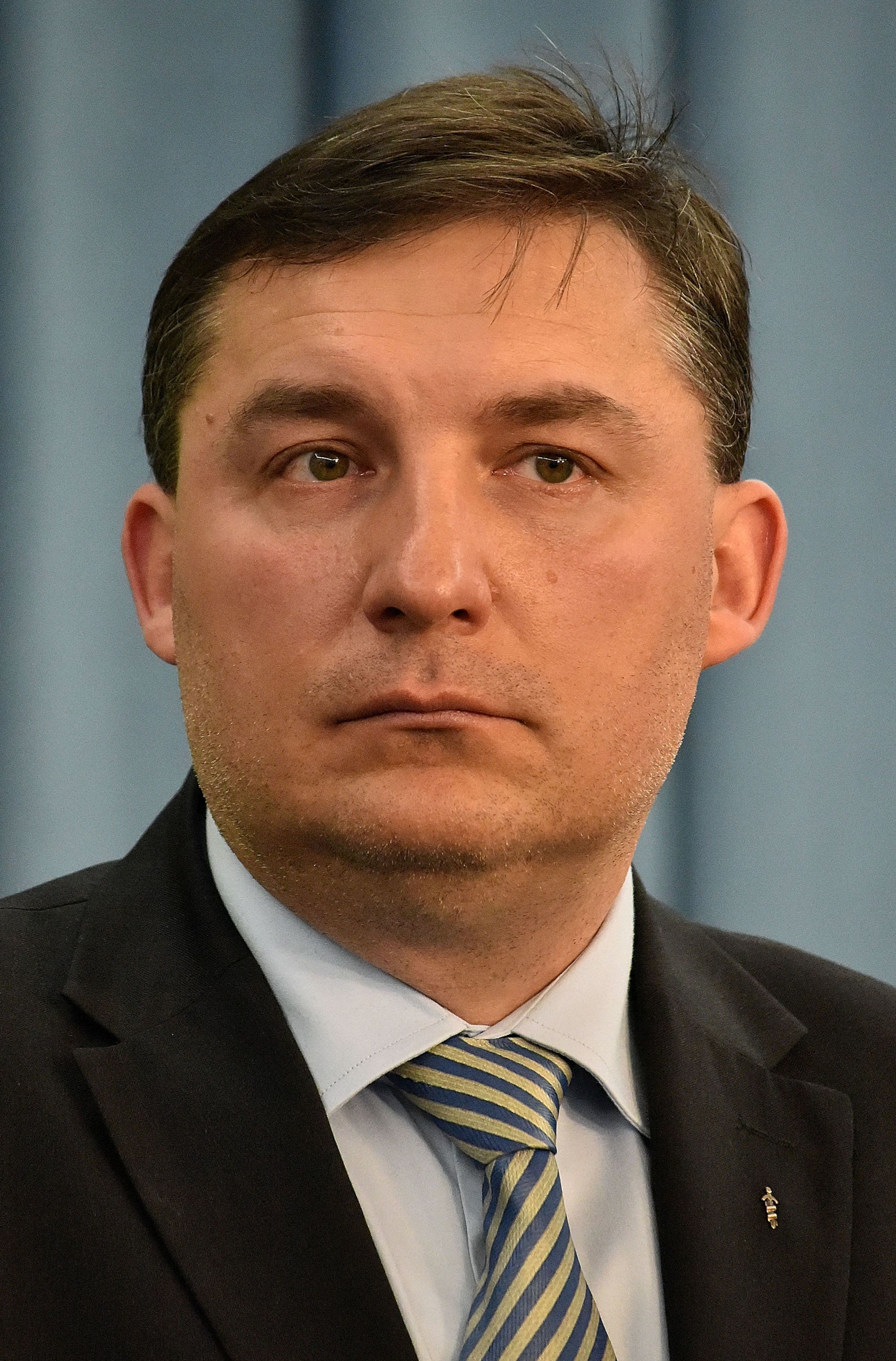

Acting President of the League of Polish Families
- Incumbent
- Assumed office October 24, 2007
- Preceded by: Roman Giertych

Member of the European Parliament
- Incumbent
- Assumed office July 20, 2004
- Constituency: Lower Silesian and Opole

Personal details
- Born: August 22, 1972 (age 53) Piekary Śląskie, Poland
- Party: Naprzód Polsko; Union for Europe of the Nations (as MEP)

Sylwester Arkadiusz Chruszcz (born 22 August 1972, in Głogów) is a Polish politician and Member of the European Parliament (MEP) for the Lower Silesian Voivodship and Opole Voivodship with the Naprzód Polsko, part of the Union for Europe of the Nations and is member of the European Parliament's Committee on Transport and Tourism.

Chruszcz is a substitute for the Committee on Regional Development and a member of the Delegation for relations with Canada.

After the 2007 parliamentary election, when Liga lost all its seats in the Sejm and the Senat, its leader Roman Giertych resigned and announced his withdrawal from policy. Chruszcz was named acting leader.

== Education ==
- 1997: Master's in Architectural Engineering

== Career ==
- 1999-2004: Architect in the 'E & L Architects' design studio in Warsaw (1997 - 1999), architect in the 'CH 2 Architects' design studio in Szczecin
- Vice-Chairman of the board of the League of Polish Families (2004 - )

== See also ==
- 2004 European Parliament election in Poland
