= Filip Adwent =

Polish politician

Filip Stanisław Adwent
- Born: August 31, 1955; Strasbourg, France
- Died: June 26, 2005 (aged 49)
- Occupation: Politician

Filip Stanisław Adwent (31 August 1955 – 26 June 2005) was a Polish politician and a Member of the European Parliament for the Pomeranian Voivodship. He was born in Strasbourg. He ran as a candidate from the League of Polish Families, and sat on the European Parliament's Committee on Agriculture and Rural Development.

Adwent was a substitute for the Committee on Transport and Tourism and a vice-chair of the Delegation to the EU-Ukraine Parliamentary Cooperation Committee.

He died eight days after he and his family were involved in a multiple car accident which occurred on 18 June 2005 near Warsaw. His father and daughter died instantly, along with two other people. Adwent, aged 49, and his mother died eight (8) days later from their injuries.

== Education ==
- 2004: Physician specialising in anaesthesiology and intensive therapy (1983), post-graduate studies at the Warsaw Agricultural University in Environmental Protection

== Career ==
- 2001-2002: Member of the Polish Alliance
- Organiser of aid to Polish hospitals for 15 years, honoured by the Minister of Health and Social Welfare for services to the protection of health

See: 2004 European Parliament election in Poland
