= Małgorzata Handzlik =

Polish politician (born 1965)

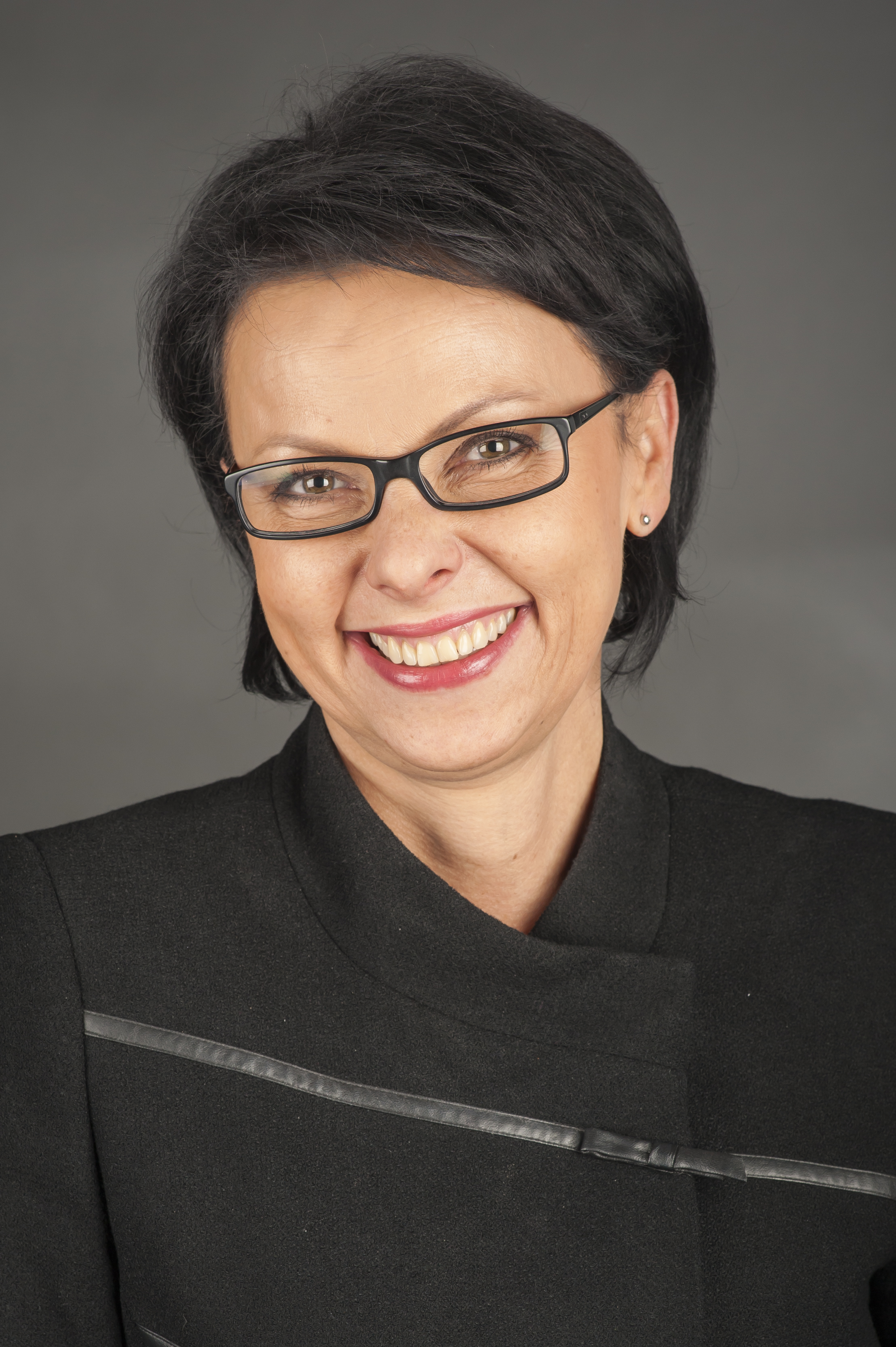
Handzlik, 2014

Video Introduction (English) / (Polish)

Małgorzata Maria Handzlik (born 1 January 1965, in Bielsko-Biała) is a Polish politician and former Member of the European Parliament (MEP). She was elected in 2004 and 2009 for the Civic Platform (Platforma Obywatelska, PO), and chose not to run for reelection in 2014.

== Career ==
Handzlik graduated from the University of Silesia in 1990.

On 26 November 2014, she was charged with counterfeiting and fraud by the District Prosecutor's Office in Warsaw.

== Personal life ==
Handzlik learned Esperanto in the 1980s during her travels with her husband, an Esperanto singer, writer, publisher, and teacher. Apart from promoting her party's objectives, Handzlik has declared to stand in for multilingualism and equal linguistic rights for all citizens. Handzlik is a fluent speaker of Esperanto and proposes to investigate the possible role of this language as a second language for all Europeans.

Handzlik has two daughters.
