= Jacek Protasiewicz =

Polish politician (born 1967)

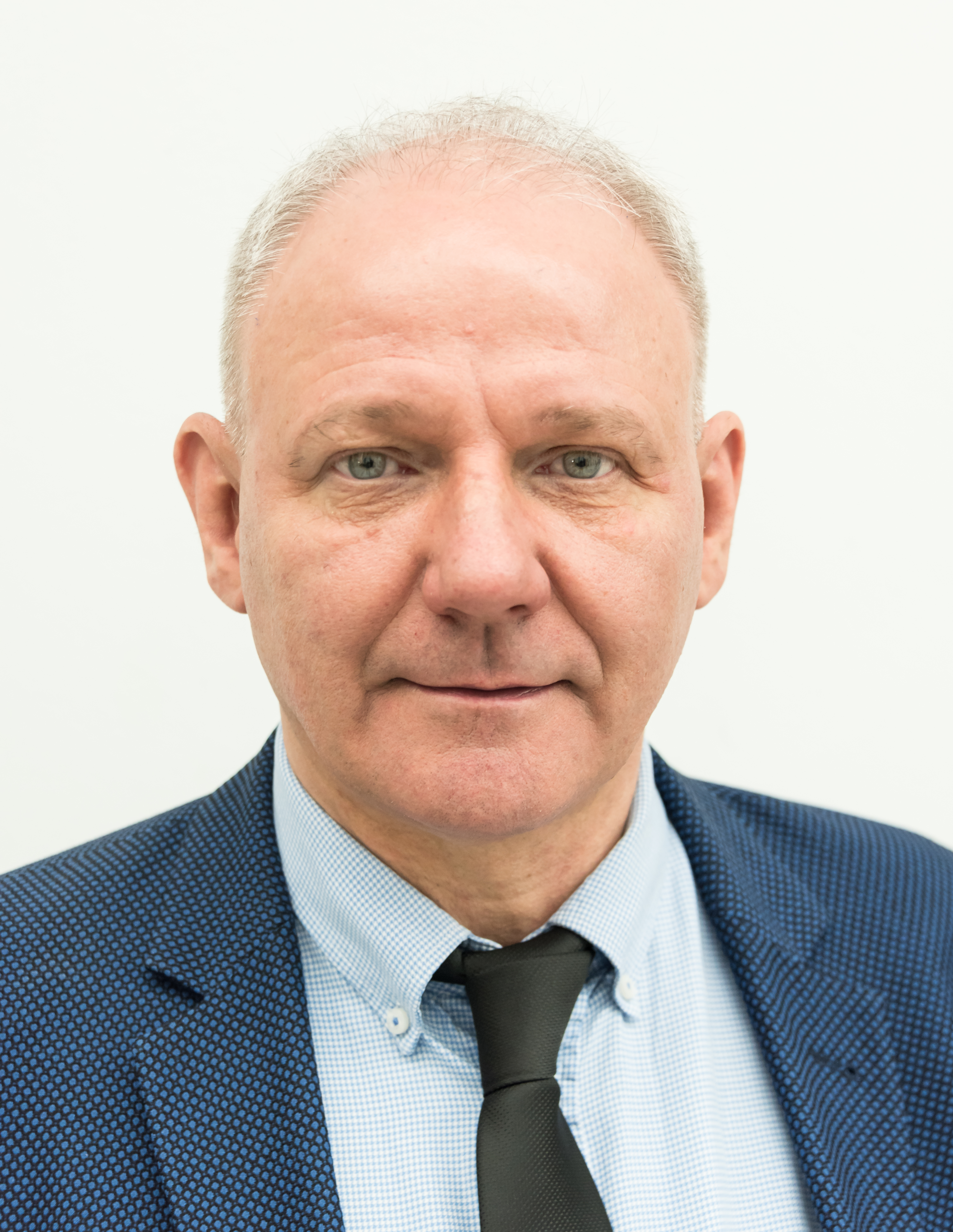
Jacek Protasiewicz (2023)

Jacek Protasiewicz (born 5 June 1967 in Brzeg) is a Polish politician. Graduated from Wroclaw University where in the 80s of 20th century was a leader of anti communist student organization (NZS). In 1995 was an international fellow at the Kettering Foundation based in Dayton, Ohio. He was a local leader of a liberal party (KL-D) in 1994 and then the Union of Freedom - the party led by a first non-communist Prime Minister of Poland. In 2001 he was a cofounder and a local leader of Civic Platform - a party led by Donald Tusk - later Prime Minister of Poland and Head of the European Council. First time elected to a regional assembly in 1998 and then to the Polish Parliament in 2001. In 2004 he was elected to the European Parliament where he served as Chair of Delegation for Belarus (2007-2012) and as the Vice-President 2012-2014 in charge for relations with parliaments of Eastern Partnership countries as well as with NATO Parliamentary Assembly. He was the Head of the presidential election campaign of Donald Tusk in 2005 and the Civic Platform election campaign in 2011. In 2015 elected again to Polish Parliament and re-elected in 2019. Nowadays he serves as a Deputy Head of the Polish Coalition caucus in Polish Parliament and member of Committee for European Union Affairs and Committee for Public Finance.

== Education ==
- 1994: Graduate of the University of Wrocław

== Career ==
- 1990-1992: Press spokesman for the Voivodship of Wrocław
- 1992-1994: Member of the National Council and Chairman of the Wrocław branch of the Liberal-Democratic Congress (KLD)
- 1994-1995: assistant to the Chairman of the Wrocław City Council
- 1994-2000: Member of the National Council of the Freedom Union (UW)
- 1997-2000: Chairman of the Wrocław region of the UW
- 1998-2001: Chairman of the Committee on Tourism, Sport and Recreation (1998-2001) and the UW Union of Councillors in the Regional Council of the Voivodship of Lower Silesia
- 1999-2001: director of the Bureau for the Promotion of the City and Cooperation with Other Countries, Office of the City of Wrocław (1996-2001) and press spokesman for the Wrocław City Council
- 2000-2001: Member and Vice-Chairman of the Board of the Polish Tourist Organisation
- 2000-2002: Vice-Chairman of the Lower Silesian Tourist Organisation
- 2001-2004: Member of Parliament of the Polish Republic
- 2001: Member of the National Council of the Citizens' Platform (PO)
- 2003-2004: MEP - Observer in the EP (EPP-ED and the Committee on Economic and Monetary Affairs
- 2003: Chairman of the PO in Wrocław
