= Andrzej Tomasz Zapałowski =

Polish MEP

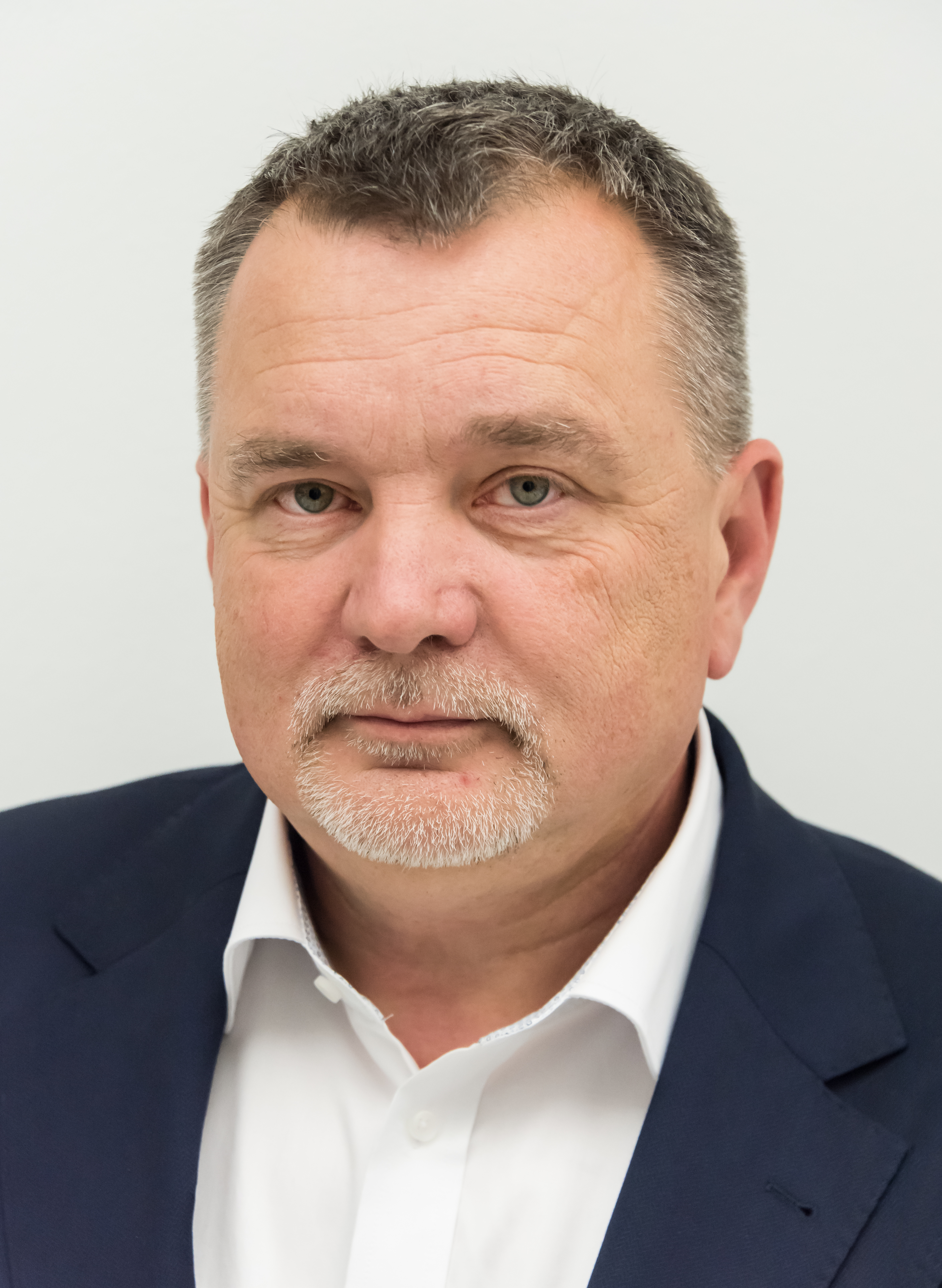
Andrzej Zapałowski

Andrzej Tomasz Zapałowski (6 November 1966 in Wałbrzych, Poland) is a Polish politician and a Member of the European Parliament (MEP). He is a member of the League of Polish Families, which is a part of the European Christian Political Party.

He is vice-chairman of the delegation to the EU-Ukraine Parliamentary Cooperation Committee and a member of the Committee on Agriculture and Rural Development. He is a substitute on the Committee on Legal Affairs. Prior to becoming a Member of the European Parliament, he was a member of the Polish Parliament from 1997 to 2001.

Andrzej Tomasz Zapałowski graduated from the Kraków School of Education in 1990 with a master's degree in history and from the Rzeszów branch of Marie Curie Skłodowska University in 1998 with a master's degree in law. He received a doctorate in 2003 from the National Defence Academy in Warsaw. He taught at Primary School No. 16 in Przemyśl from 1991 to 1996 and was the principal of that school in 1996 and 1997. In 2002 and 2003 he lectured at the Higher National Vocational School in Jarosław and held a position of a teacher for a group of schools in Przemyśl with a department for integration of the disabled. From 2003 to 2005 he was director of the Przemyśl Regional Centre for Culture, Education and Science.

Between 1986 and 2001, he was a member of the Confederation of Independent Poland, as the head of his section and a member of the Political Council. From 2002 to 2005 he was a member of the League of Polish Families, a member of the League's provincial bureau, and a member of the League's Political Council. As a member of the Polish Parliament between 1997 and 2001, he was a Parliament Secretary, a member of the National Defence Committee, and a member of the Committee for Liaison with Poles Abroad.
