= 2009 European Parliament election in Poland =

- 7 June 2009

50 seats to the European Parliament
- Turnout: 24.53%
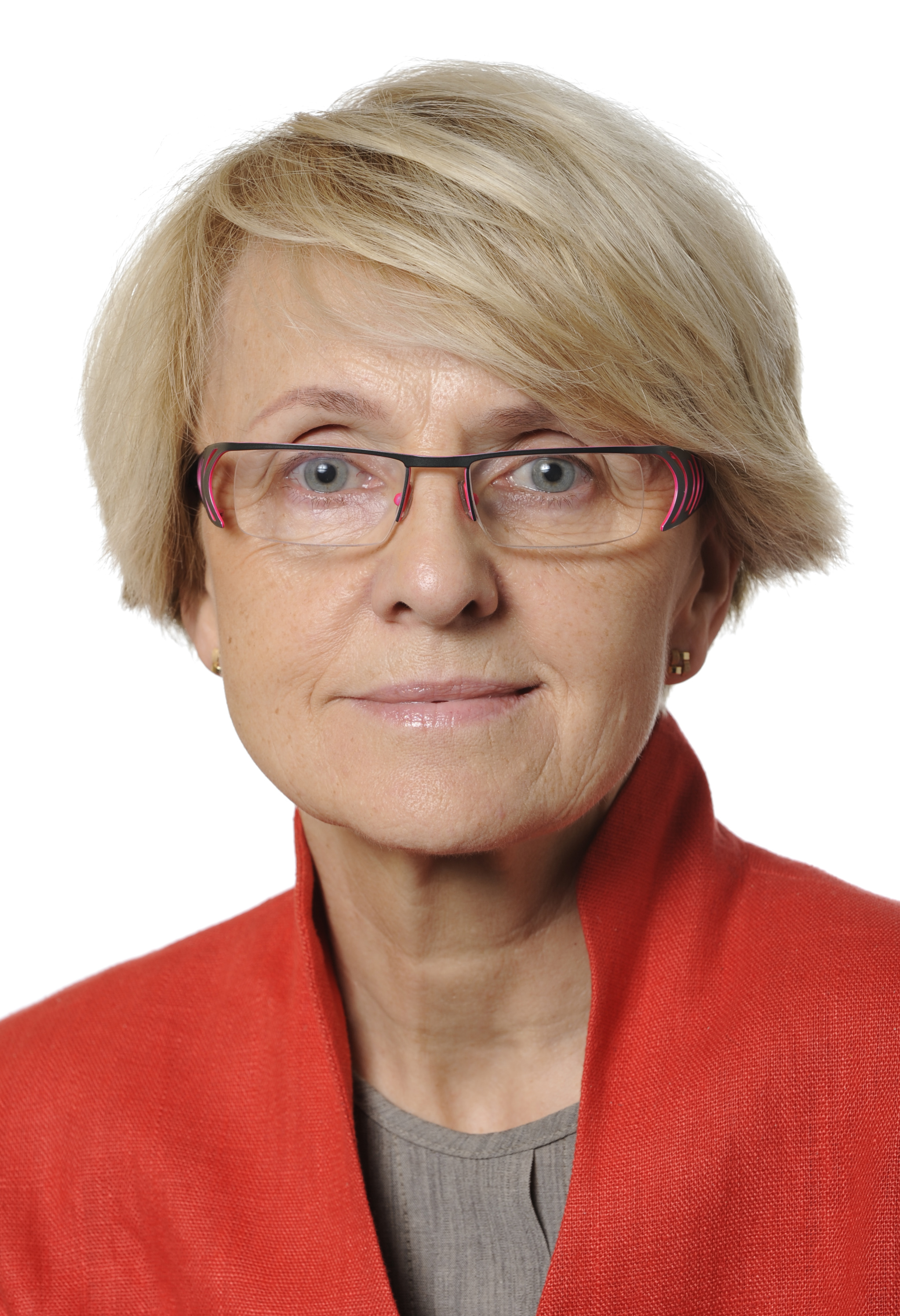

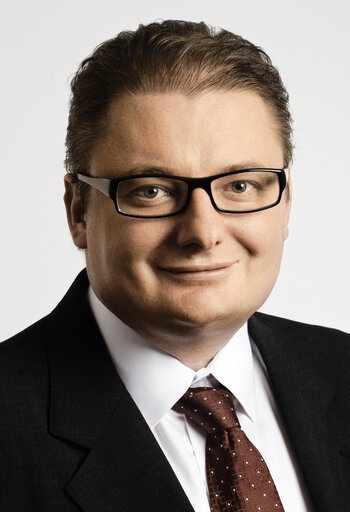

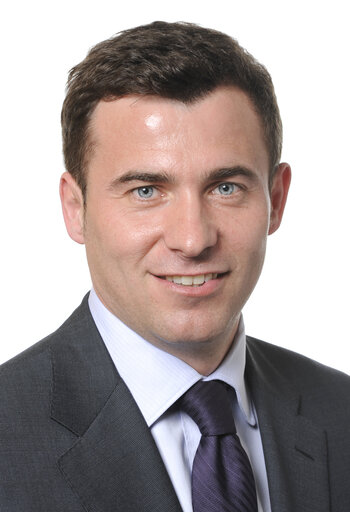

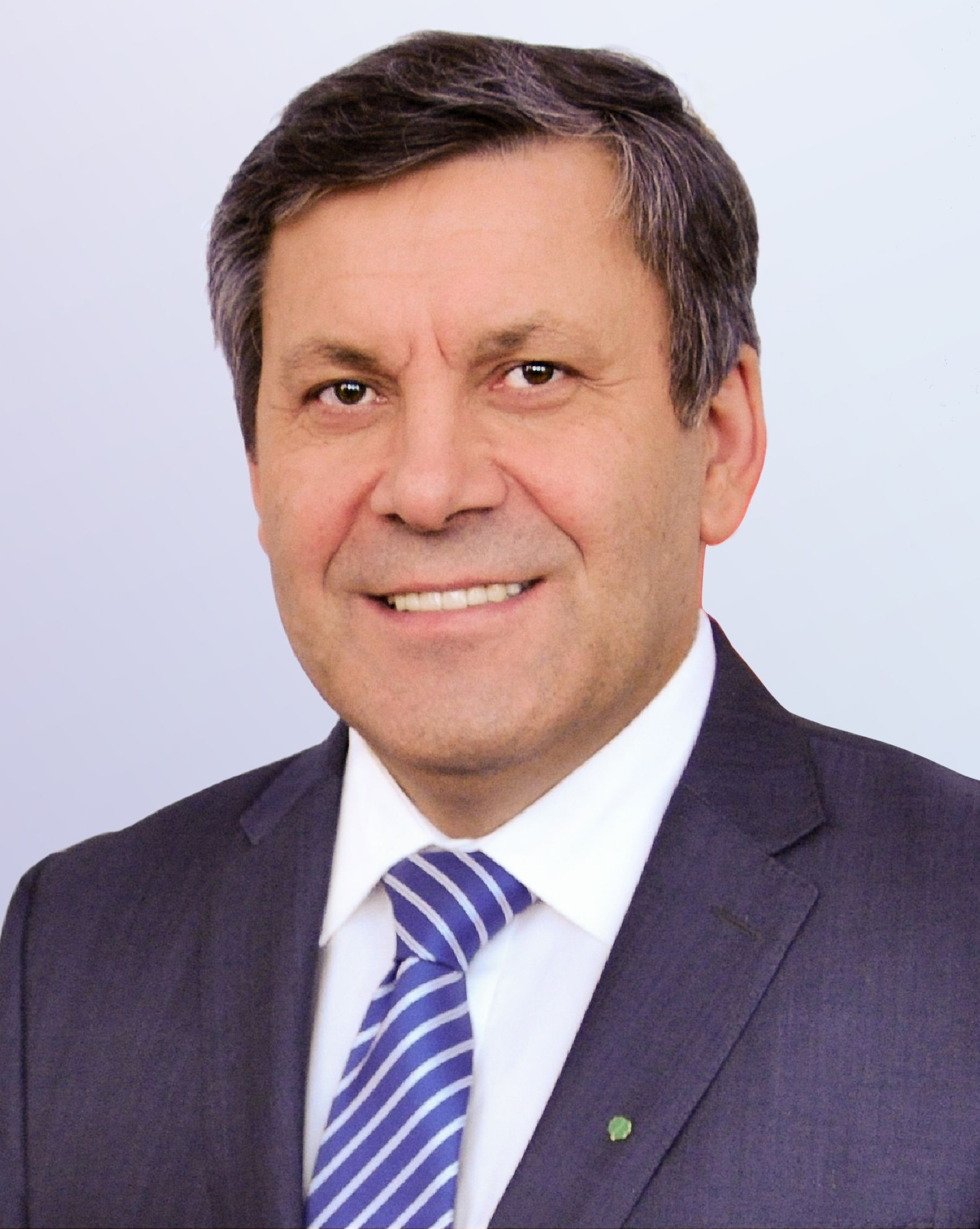
	First party	Second party
Leader	Danuta Hübner	Michał Kamiński
Party	PO	PiS
Alliance	EPP	ECR
Last election	24.1%, 15 seats	12.7%, 7 seats
Seats won	25	15
Seat change	▲10	▲8
Popular vote	3,271,852	2,017,607
Percentage	44.4%	27.4%
Swing	▲20.3 pp	▲14.7 pp
	Third party	Fourth party
Leader	Wojciech Olejniczak	Janusz Piechociński
Party	SLD	PSL
Alliance	S&D	EPP
Last election	9.4%, 5 seats	6.3%, 4 seats
Seats won	7	3
Seat change	▲2	▼1
Popular vote	908,765	516,146
Percentage	12.3%	7.0%
Swing	▲2.9 pp	▲0.7 pp
- Election result and the plurality list's popular vote in each constituency

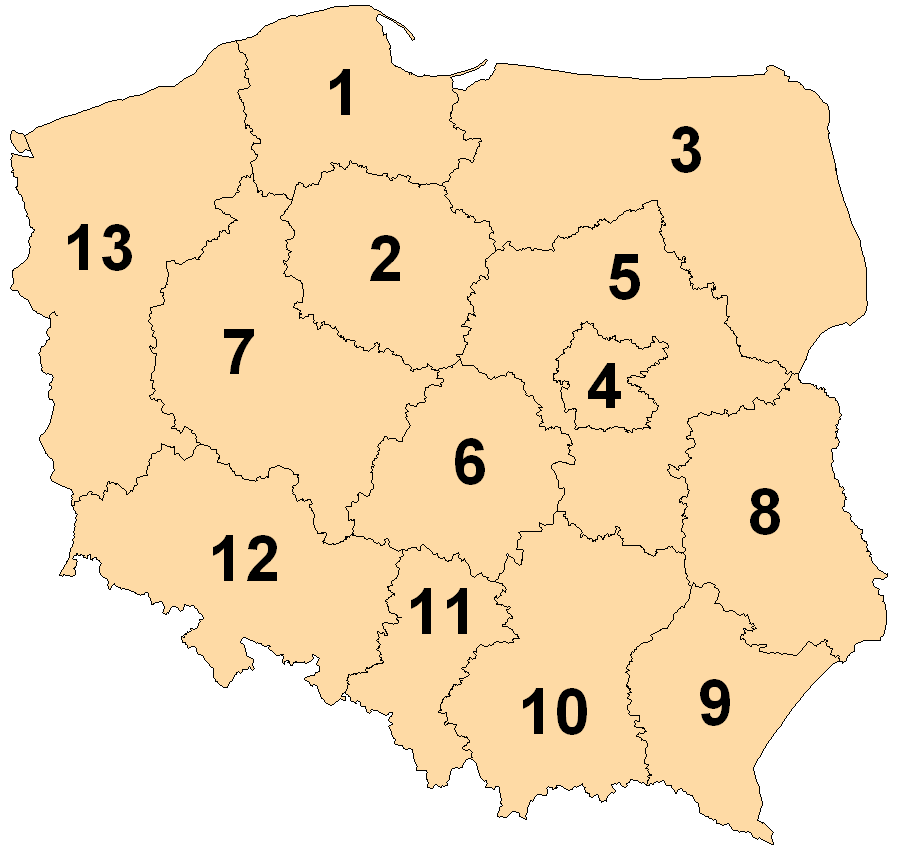
Poland is divided into 13 electoral districts whose numbers are displayed on the picture

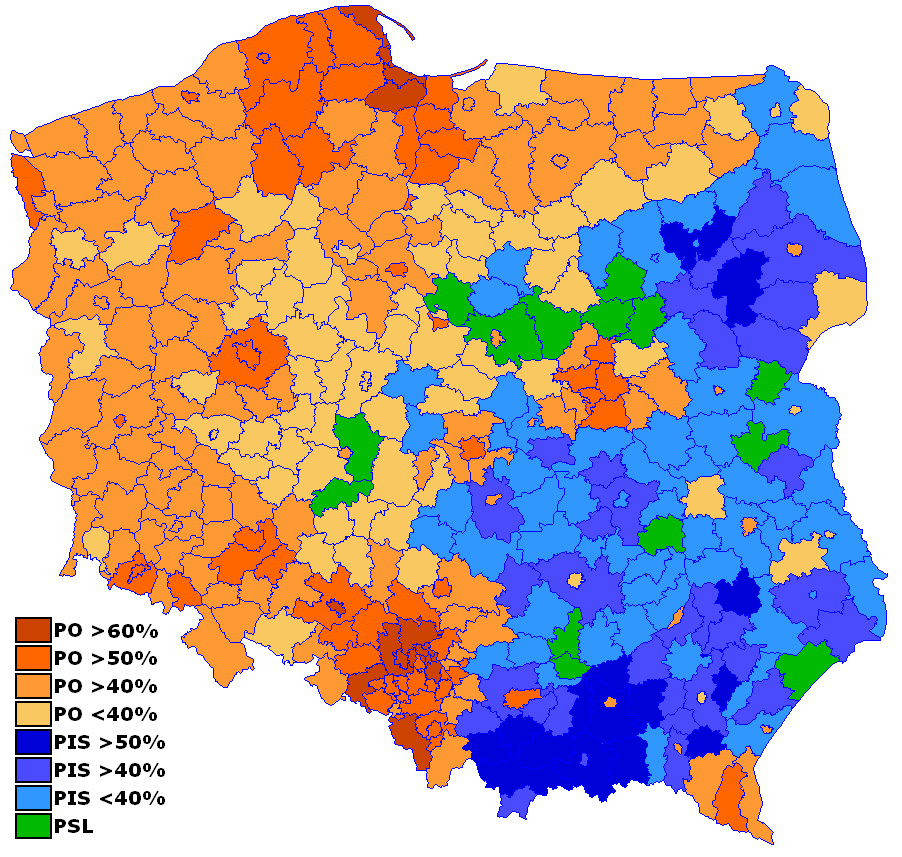
Powiats won by ■ – Civic Platform ■ – Law and Justice ■ – Polish People's Party

An election of the delegation from Poland to the European Parliament was held on 7 June 2009. On 13 February the Sejm (the lower house of the Polish parliament) accepted a proposal for an amendment to the electoral court act to allow voting for the European Parliament election of 2009 to take place over 2 days i.e. the 6 and 7 June 2009. However, on 5 March, the proposal was referred to the Constitutional Tribunal of the Republic of Poland by the Polish President, Lech Kaczyński. The Polish electorate elected 50 MEPs. In the 27 EU Member States, at total of 736 MEPs were elected from 4–7 June 2009.

As anticipated, the Civic Platform (PO) won a significant victory, winning more than 44% of the vote and gaining half of the total seats. PO's vote was higher than their 41.5% achieved at the 2007 Polish parliamentary election, and to date was the highest vote achieved by a Polish political party to either the Sejm (national legislature) or the European Parliament. Law and Justice (PiS), came second (27.4%), having more than doubled their vote and seats won as compared to the 2004 EU election, but their vote fell, in comparison to the national elections of 2007. PO polled strongest in the western half of Poland, whilst PiS polled best in the eastern half, particularly the south-east.

The largest grouping on the left, the Democratic Left Alliance-Labor Union (SLD-UP) came in at a distant third with 12.3% of the vote and seven seats. At one time, the biggest party in Poland, the Democratic Left Alliance's vote was fairly static over the past five years, and they have been unable to challenge the dominance of PO and PiS, since 2005. The Polish People's Party (PSL) came fourth with 7% of the vote, and won three seats. The remaining parties failed to reach the 5% threshold required to win seats.

The election result demonstrated a stability in voting patterns in the country. Previously, especially prior to 2005, the political environment in Poland was rather unpredictable, with big swings away from established parties, towards alternative parties, and ongoing splits and mergers of key parties. In 2009, however, the voting pattern did not vary too substantially from the 2007 elections, with the large parties consolidating their positions, and smaller parties failing to make a breakthrough.

== Contesting committees ==
Name	Ideology	European Union position	Leader	Main candidate (Note: Leading candidate in Warsaw (if the party leader does not run personally in another district))	Alliance	2004 result		Current seats
Name	Ideology	European Union position	Leader	Main candidate	Alliance	Vote (%)	Seats	Current seats
Civic Platform (PO)	Centrism, catch-all	Hard pro-Europeanism	Donald Tusk	Danuta Hübner	EPP	24.1%	15 / 54	14 / 54
Law and Justice (PiS) • Forward Poland • Piast	National conservatism, Christian democracy	Soft Euroscepticism	Jarosław Kaczyński	Michał Kamiński	UEN	12.7%	7 / 54	10 / 54
Alliance for the Future (PdP) • Democratic Party – demokraci.pl • Social Democracy of Poland • The Greens • Union of the Left • Alliance of Democrats	Social liberalism, social democracy	Hard pro-Europeanism	Dariusz Rosati		• ALDE • S&D • G-EFA	12.9%	7 / 54	9 / 54
Libertas Poland (LP) • League of Polish Families • Party of Regions • Forward Poland • Piast	Anti-Lisbon Treaty, souverainism	Hard Euroscepticism	Daniel Pawłowiec		• UEN • NI	15.9%	10 / 54	8 / 54
Democratic Left Alliance (SLD) • Labor Union • National Party of Retirees and Pensioners	Social democracy, third way	Hard pro-Europeanism	Grzegorz Napieralski	Wojciech Olejniczak	S&D	9.4%	5 / 54	5 / 54
Polish People's Party (PSL)	Agrarianism, Christian democracy	Hard pro-Europeanism	Waldemar Pawlak	Janusz Piechociński	EPP	6.3%	4 / 54	2 / 54
Self-Defence of the Republic of Poland (SRP)	Agrarian socialism, left-wing populism	Hard Euroscepticism	Andrzej Lepper	Jan Sochocki	• S&D • UEN • EUD	10.8%	6 / 54	2 / 54
Polish Labour Party (PPP)	Democratic socialism, anti-capitalism	Soft Euroscepticism	Bogusław Ziętek		GUE-NGL	0.5%	0 / 54	1 / 54
Right Wing of the Republic (PR)	Political Catholicism, Christian right	Soft Euroscepticism	Marek Jurek		IND/DEM	-	0 / 54	1 / 54
Real Politics Union (UPR)	Right-Libertarianism, Laissez-faire	Hard Euroscepticism	Bolesław Witczak		NI	1.9%	0 / 54	0 / 54

=== Lead candidates by constituency ===
Constituency	PO	PiS	SLD-UP	PSL	PdP	Libertas	Cite
Pomeranian	Janusz Lewandowski	Hanna Foltyn-Kubicka	Longin Pastusiak	Wojciech Przybylski	Dariusz Szwed	Tomasz Sommer	
Kuyavian-Pomeranian	Tadeusz Zwiefka	Richard Czarnecki	Janusz Zemke	Eugeniusz Kłopotek	Henryk Kierzkowski	Ryszard Kozłowski	
Podlaskie and Warmian-Masurian	Krzysztof Lisek	Jacek Kurski	Tadeusz Iwiński	Stanisław Żelichowski	Marian Szamatowicz	Ryszard Bender	
Warsaw	Danuta Hübner	Michał Kamiński	Wojciech Olejniczak	Janusz Piechociński	Dariusz Rosati	Artur Zawisza	
Masovian	Jacek Kozłowski	Adam Bielan	Marek Wikiński	Jarosław Kalinowski	Marek Czarnecki	Dariusz Grabowski	
Łódź	Jacek Saryusz-Wolski	Urszula Krupa	Jolanta Szymanek-Deresz	Adam Fronczak	Magdalena Środa	Bolesław Borysiuk	
Greater Poland	Filip Kaczmarek	Konrad Szymański	Marek Siwiec	Andrzej Grzyb	Sylwia Pusz	Anna Sobecka	
Lublin	Lena Kolarska - Bobińska	Mirosław Piotrowski	Jacek Czerniak	Edward Wojtas	Marek Borowski	Zdzisław Podkański	
Subcarpathian	Marian Krzaklewski	Tomasz Poręba	Marta Niewczas	Mieczysław Janowski	Krzysztof Martens	Daniel Pawłowiec	
Lesser Poland and Świętokrzyskie	Róża Gräfin Von Thun Und Hohenstein	Zbigniew Ziobro	Andrzej Szejna	Czesław Siekierski	Janusz Onyszkiewicz	Wojciech Wierzejski	
Silesian	Jerzy Buzek	Marek Migalski	Jerzy Markowski	Janusz Moszyński	Genowefa Grabowska	Piotr Ślusarczyk	
Lower Silesian and Opole	Jacek Protasiewicz	Ryszard Legutko	Lidia Geringer De Oedenberg	Stanisław Rakoczy	Józef Pinior	Janusz Dobrosz	
Lubusz and West Pomeranian	Sławomir Nitras	Marek Gróbarczyk	Bogusław Liberadzki	Juliusz Engelhardt	Radosław Popiela	Krzysztof Zaremba	

== Opinion polls ==
Source	Date	PO	PiS	SLD-UP	PSL	PdP	Undecided
CBOS	March 2009	40%	17%	10%	5%	1%	21%
TNS OBOP	2–5 April 2009	54%	21%	7%	6%	–	28%
PBS	3–5 April 2009	49%	22%	13%	6%	3%	–
GFK	24–26 April 2009	47%	26%	12%	6%	–	–
Gemius	5 May 2009	40%	16%	11%	3%	2%	–
TNS OBOP	6–7 May 2009	47%	22%	12%	8%	2%	–
Homo Homini	7 May 2009	48.9%	22.4%	12.2%	4.6%	1.3%	8.0%
TNS OBOP	15 May 2009	48%	25%	8%	5%	5%	–
Gemius	19 May 2009	39%	20%	7%	6%	4%	–
Homo Homini	26 May 2009	45%	25%	11%	7%	3%	–
GFK	3–4 June 2009	51%	24%	15%	6%	–	–
SMG/KRC	5 June 2009	54%	25%	9%	7%	–	–

== Results ==
Party	Votes	%	Seats	+/–
Civic Platform	3,271,852	44.43	25	+10
Law and Justice	2,017,607	27.40	15	+8
Democratic Left Alliance – Labour Union	908,765	12.34	7	+2
Polish People's Party	516,146	7.01	3	–1
Alliance for the Future	179,602	2.44	0	–7
Right Wing of the Republic	143,966	1.95	0	New
Self-Defence of the Republic of Poland	107,185	1.46	0	–6
Libertas Poland	83,754	1.14	0	–10
Real Politics Union	81,146	1.10	0	0
Polish Labour Party	51,872	0.70	0	0
Forward Poland–Piast	1,537	0.02	0	New
Polish Socialist Party	1,331	0.02	0	New
Total	7,364,763	100.00	50	–4
Valid votes	7,364,763	98.17		
Invalid/blank votes	137,573	1.83		
Total votes	7,502,336	100.00		
Registered voters/turnout	30,565,272	24.55		
Source: PKW

== See also ==
- Politics of Poland
- Poland (European Parliament constituency)
