= Poland (European Parliament constituency) =

Constituency of the European Parliament

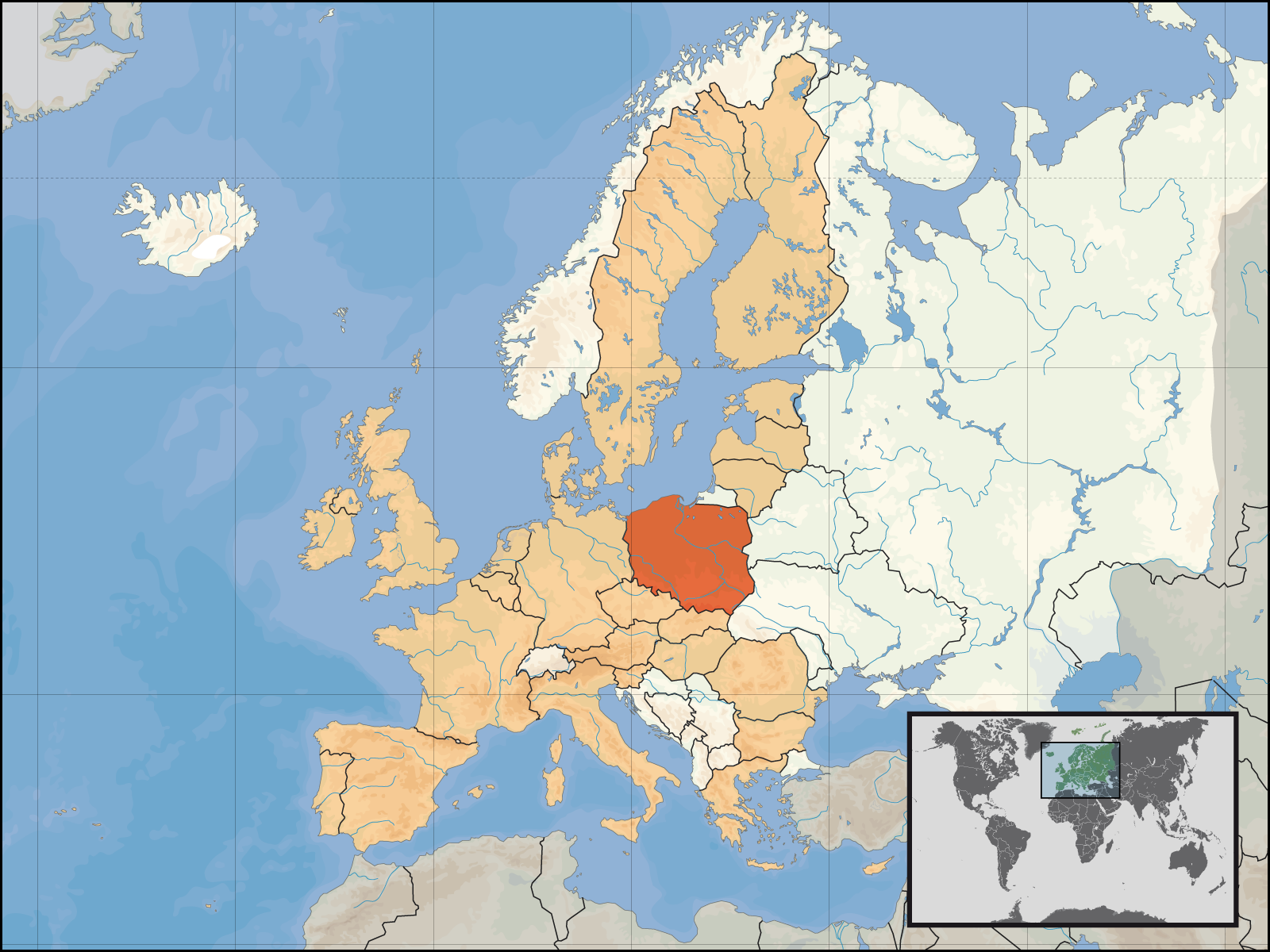
The Poland constituency within the European Union.

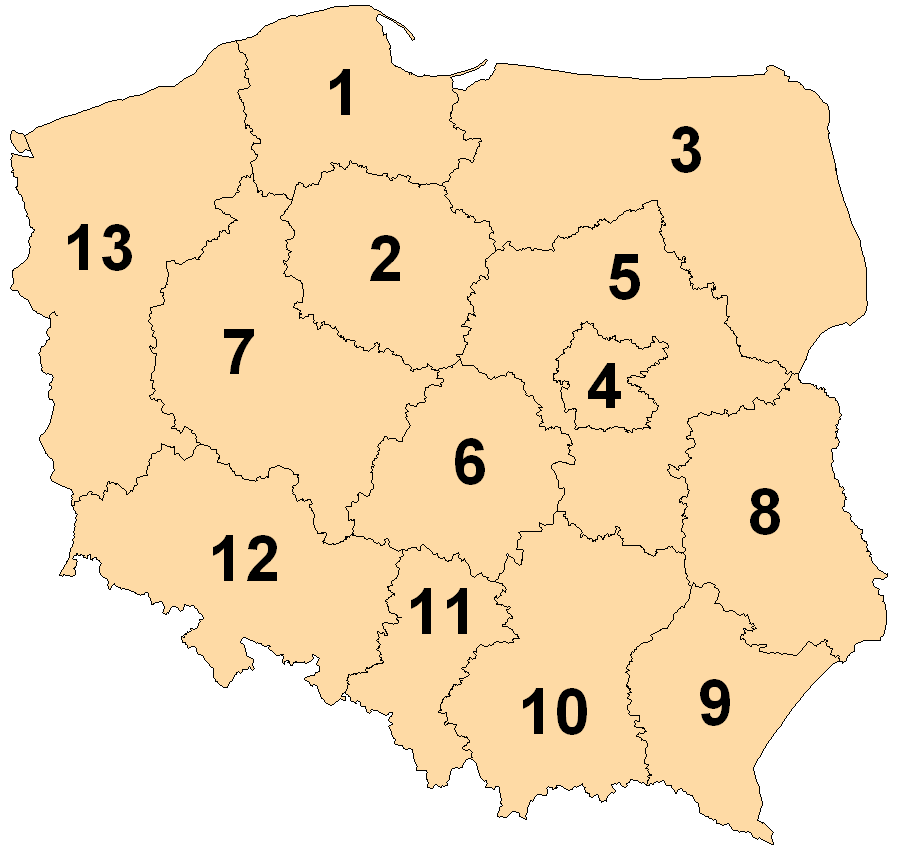
Map of European Parliament constituencies in Poland.

In European elections, the member state of Poland is subdivided into constituencies. However, the number of seats in each subconstituency is not decided until after the election. Poland therefore is sometimes treated as a single constituency for purposes of reportage.

== List of constituencies ==
Constituency	Area/Community	Seats		Population, 2012 (thousands)		Area (km^{2})
Constituency	Area/Community	At election	Current	Total	Per cur. seat	Area (km^{2})
Pomeranian	Pomeranian Voivodeship	3	3	2,287	762	18,310
Kuyavian-Pomeranian	Kuyavian-Pomeranian Voivodeship	2	2	2,097	1,049	17,972
Podlaskie and Warmian-Masurian	Podlaskie and Warmian-Masurian Voivodeships	3	3	2,651	884	44,360
Warsaw	Part of the Masovian Voivodeship: City of Warsaw and Sejm Constituency no. 20 (Note: Sejm Constituency no. 20 consists of powiats Grodzisk, Legionowo, Nowy Dwór, Otwock, Piaseczno, Pruszków, Warsaw West and Wołomin)	6	6	2,795	466	11,205
Masovian	The rest of the Masovian Voivodeship (Note: Powiats: Ciechanów, Gostynin, Mława, Płock, Płońsk, Przasnysz, Sierpc, Sochaczew, Żuromin, Żyrardów, Białobrzegi, Grójec, Kozienice, Lipsko, Przysucha, Radom, Szydłowiec, Zwoleń, Garwolin, Łosice, Maków Mazowiecki, Mińsk Mazowiecki, Ostrołęka, Ostrów, Pułtusk, Siedlce, Sokołów, Węgrów, Wyszków and the cities of Radom, Płock, Ciechanów, Ostrołęka and Siedlce)	3	3	2,499	833	24,353
Łódź	Łódź Voivodeship	3	3	2,529	843	18,219
Greater Poland	Greater Poland Voivodeship	5	5	3,350	670	15,183
Lublin	Lublin Voivodeship	3	3	2,169	732	25,122
Subcarpathian	Subcarpathian Voivodeship	3	3	2,129	710	17,846
Lesser Poland and Świętokrzyskie	Lesser Poland and Świętokrzyskie Voivodeships	5	6	4,735	789	41,537
Silesian	Silesian Voivodeship	7	7	4,621	660	12,333
Lower Silesian and Opole	Lower Silesian and Opole Voivodeships	4	4	3,928	982	29,359
Lubusz and West Pomeranian	Lubusz and West Pomeranian Voivodeships	4	4	2,745	686	36,880

== 2004 ==
The 2004 European election was the sixth election to the European Parliament. However, as Poland had only joined the European Union earlier that month, it was the first election European election held in that state. The election took place on 13 June.

The elections resulted in a heavy defeat for the governing Alliance of the Democratic Left and Labor Union parties, although the very low turnout makes a direct comparison with national election results difficult. As expected the most successful party was the Civic Platform. Second place was taken by the strongly anti-EU League of Polish Families.

The radical populist Self-Defense of the Polish Republic, which some opinion polls had predicted would come second, came fourth after the Law and Justice party. The election results were a success for Social Democracy of Poland, which managed to cross the required 5% threshold, and the Freedom Union, which got over twice the expected percentage of votes.

== 2009 ==
The 2009 European Parliament election in Poland was on Sunday 7 June 2009 and the number of seats was 50.
