= List of Social Democracy of Poland politicians =

A list of notable Polish politicians of the Social Democracy of Poland (Polish: Socjaldemokracja Polska).

== A ==
- Bartosz Arłukowicz

== B ==
- Marek Borowski

== C ==
- Andrzej Celiński

== G ==
- Genowefa Grabowska

== K ==
- Jerzy Kulej

== N ==
- Tomasz Nałęcz

== P ==
- Józef Pinior

== R ==
- Dariusz Rosati

== S ==
- Izabella Sierakowska

== Z ==
- Zbigniew Zychowicz
