= Lubusz and West Pomeranian (European Parliament constituency) =

Constituency of the European Parliament

- European Parliament constituency
- Location among the current constituencies

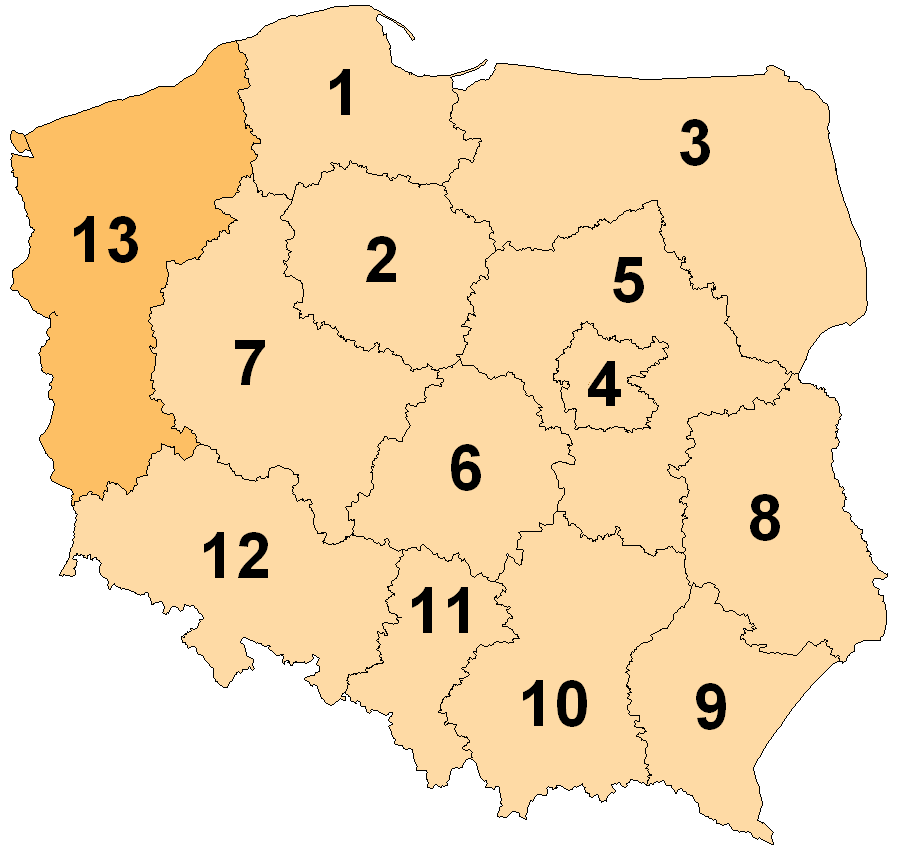
- 13th constituency in Poland
- Member state: Poland
- Created: 2004
- MEPs: 2 (since 2024, 2004-2009) 4 (2019-2024, 2009-2014); 3 (2014-2019)

Lubusz and West Pomeranian (Polish: lubuskie i zachodniopomorskie) is a constituency represented in the European Parliament. The constituency is composed of Lubusz and West Pomeranian Voivodeships.

== Nomenclature ==
The relevant Polish legislation ("The Act of 23 January 2004 on Elections to the European Parliament") establishing the constituencies does not give the constituencies formal names. Instead, each constituency has a number, territorial description, and location of the Constituency Electoral Commission. The 2004 Polish National Election Commission and the 2004 European Parliament Election website uses the territorial description when referring to the constituency, not the electoral commission location.

== Members of the European Parliament ==
Election	MEP (party)	MEP (party)	MEP (party)	MEP (party)
2004	Zdzisław Chmielewski (PO)	Bogusław Liberadzki (SLD-UP) (L)	2 seats 2004-2009	
2009	Sławomir Nitras (PO)	Bogusław Liberadzki (SLD-UP) (L)	Marek Gróbarczyk (PiS)	Artur Zasada (PO)
2014	Dariusz Rosati (PO)	Bogusław Liberadzki (SLD-UP) (L)	Marek Gróbarczyk (PiS)	3 seats 2014-2019
2015	Dariusz Rosati (PO)	Bogusław Liberadzki (SLD-UP) (L)	Czesław Hoc (PiS)	3 seats 2014-2019
2019	Bartosz Arłukowicz (KO)	Bogusław Liberadzki (SLD-UP) (L)	Joachim Brudziński (PiS)	Elżbieta Rafalska (PiS)
2023	Witold Pahl (KO)	Bogusław Liberadzki (SLD-UP) (L)	Joachim Brudziński (PiS)	Elżbieta Rafalska (PiS)
2024	Bartosz Arłukowicz (KO)	2 seats since 2024	Joachim Brudziński (PiS)	2 seats since 2024

== Election results ==
=== 2004 ===
2004 European Parliament election
Electoral committee	Votes	%	Seats
Civic Platform	96,858	25.97	1
Self-Defence of the Republic of Poland	49,876	13.38	–
League of Polish Families	45,064	12.08	–
Law and Justice	44,236	11.86	–
Democratic Left Alliance – Labour Union	43,328	11.62	1
Social Democracy of Poland	23,651	6.34	–
Freedom Union	22,235	5.96	–
Polish People's Party	13,217	3.54	–
Real Politics Union	6,367	1.71	–
Democratic Left Party	5,513	1.48	–
Konfederacja Ruch Obrony Bezrobotnych	5,103	1.37	–
National Electoral Committee	5,056	1.36	–
Initiative for Poland	3,905	1.05	–
KPEiR–PLD	3,819	1.02	–
All-Poland Civic Coalition	2,645	0.71	–
Polish Labour Party	2,022	0.54	–
Total	372,895	100.00	2
Valid votes	372,895	97.01	
Invalid/blank votes	11,510	2.99	
Total votes	384,405	100.00	
Registered voters/turnout	2,128,798	18.06	
Source: PKW

=== 2009 ===
2009 European Parliament election
Electoral committee	Votes	%	Seats
Civic Platform	203,038	45.88	2
Law and Justice	89,605	20.25	1
Democratic Left Alliance – Labour Union	89,471	20.22	1
Polish People's Party	22,290	5.04	–
Libertas Poland	8,112	1.83	–
Self-Defence of the Republic of Poland	7,769	1.76	–
Agreement for the Future – CenterLeft	6,269	1.42	–
Right Wing of the Republic	5,844	1.32	–
Real Politics Union	5,609	1.27	–
Polish Labour Party	4,553	1.03	–
Total	442,560	100.00	4
Valid votes	442,560	97.94	
Invalid/blank votes	9,301	2.06	
Total votes	451,861	100.00	
Registered voters/turnout	2,168,667	20.84	
Source: National Electoral Commission

=== 2014 ===
2014 European Parliament election
Electoral committee	Votes	%	Seats
Civic Platform	159,579	37.49	1
Law and Justice	108,972	25.60	1
Democratic Left Alliance – Labour Union	63,347	14.88	1
Congress of the New Right	29,353	6.90	–
Polish People's Party	21,808	5.12	–
Europa Plus—Your Movement	12,914	3.03	–
Poland Together	10,347	2.43	–
United Poland	9,770	2.30	–
National Movement	5,517	1.30	–
The Greens	4,101	0.96	–
Total	425,708	100.00	3
Valid votes	425,708	96.50	
Invalid/blank votes	15,448	3.50	
Total votes	441,156	100.00	
Registered voters/turnout	2,160,786	20.42	
Source: National Electoral Commission

=== 2019 ===
2019 European Parliament election
Electoral committee	Votes	%	Seats
European Coalition	419,819	47.76	2
Law and Justice	323,929	36.85	2
Spring	65,556	7.46	–
Confederation	34,071	3.88	–
Kukiz'15	25,941	2.95	–
Lewica Razem	9,789	1.11	–
Total	879,105	100.00	4
Valid votes	879,105	99.19	
Invalid/blank votes	7,177	0.81	
Total votes	886,282	100.00	
Registered voters/turnout	2,105,342	42.10	
Source: National Electoral Commission

=== 2024 ===
2024 European Parliament election
Electoral committee	Votes	%	Seats
Civic Coalition	337,820	44.49	1
Law and Justice	226,086	29.77	1
The Left	71,916	9.47	–
Confederation	70,138	9.24	–
Third Way	44,190	5.82	–
Bezpartyjni Samorządowcy	7,275	0.96	–
PolExit	1,948	0.26	–
Total	759,373	100.00	2
Valid votes	759,373	99.33	
Invalid/blank votes	5,148	0.67	
Total votes	764,521	100.00	
Registered voters/turnout	2,018,554	37.87	
Source: National Electoral Commission
