= Pomeranian (European Parliament constituency) =

Constituency of the European Parliament

- European Parliament constituency
- Location among the current constituencies

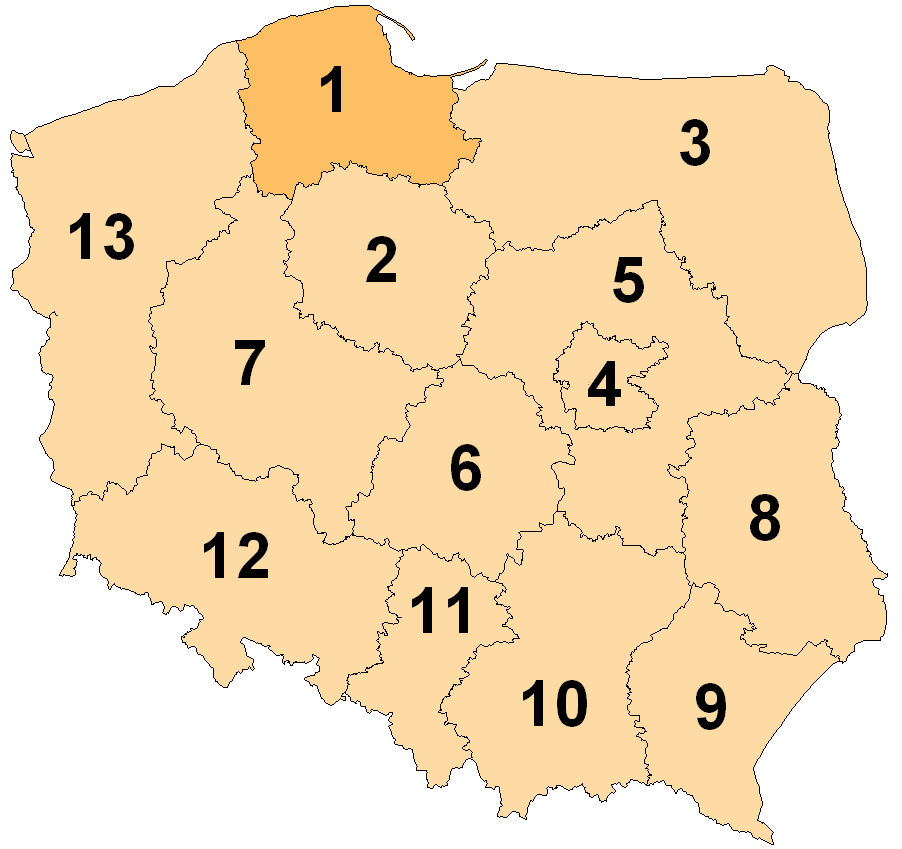
- 1st constituency in Poland
- Member state: Poland
- Created: 2004
- MEPs: 3 (since 2009); 2 (2004-2009)

Pomeranian (Polish: pomorskie) is a constituency represented in the European Parliament. It covers the area of the Pomeranian Voivodeship.

== Nomenclature ==
The relevant Polish legislation ("The Act of 23 January 2004 on Elections to the European Parliament") establishing the constituencies does not give the constituencies formal names. Instead, each constituency has a number, territorial description, and location of the Constituency Electoral Commission. The 2004 Polish National Election Commission and the 2004 European Parliament Election website uses the territorial description when referring to the constituency, not the electoral commission location.

== Members of the European Parliament ==
| Election | MEP (party) | MEP (party) | MEP (party) |
|---|---|---|---|
| 2004 | Janusz Lewandowski (PO) | Anna Fotyga (PiS) | 2 seats 2004-2009 |
| 2005 | Janusz Lewandowski (PO) | Hanna Foltyn-Kubicka (PiS) | 2 seats 2004-2009 |
| 2009 | Janusz Lewandowski (PO) | Tadeusz Cymański (PiS) | Jarosław Wałęsa (PO) |
| 2010 | Jan Kozłowski (PO) | Tadeusz Cymański (PiS) | Jarosław Wałęsa (PO) |
| 2014 | Janusz Lewandowski (PO) (KO) | Anna Fotyga (PiS) | Jarosław Wałęsa (PO) |
| 2019 | Janusz Lewandowski (PO) (KO) | Anna Fotyga (PiS) | Magdalena Adamowicz (KO) |
| 2024 | Janusz Lewandowski (PO) (KO) | Piotr Müller (PiS) | Magdalena Adamowicz (KO) |

== Election results ==
=== 2004 ===
2004 European Parliament election
| Electoral committee | Votes | % | Seats |
|---|---|---|---|
| Civic Platform | 142,613 | 36.02 | 1 |
| League of Polish Families | 54,608 | 13.79 | – |
| Law and Justice | 45,973 | 11.61 | 1 |
| Self-Defence of the Republic of Poland | 32,750 | 8.27 | – |
| Freedom Union | 30,286 | 7.65 | – |
| Democratic Left Alliance – Labour Union | 24,390 | 6.16 | – |
| Social Democracy of Poland | 23,211 | 5.86 | – |
| National Electoral Committee | 13,495 | 3.41 | – |
| Polish People's Party | 10,034 | 2.53 | – |
| Real Politics Union | 7,249 | 1.83 | – |
| KPEiR–PLD | 4,342 | 1.10 | – |
| Initiative for Poland | 3,362 | 0.85 | – |
| Polish Labour Party | 2,044 | 0.52 | – |
| All-Poland Civic Coalition | 1,608 | 0.41 | – |
| Total | 395,965 | 100.00 | 2 |
| Valid votes | 395,965 | 97.46 | |
| Invalid/blank votes | 10,331 | 2.54 | |
| Total votes | 406,296 | 100.00 | |
| Registered voters/turnout | 1,690,402 | 24.04 | |
Source: PKW

=== 2009 ===
2009 European Parliament election
| Electoral committee | Votes | % | Seats |
|---|---|---|---|
| Civic Platform | 285,268 | 59.14 | 2 |
| Law and Justice | 105,946 | 21.96 | 1 |
| Democratic Left Alliance – Labour Union | 50,427 | 10.45 | – |
| Polish People's Party | 13,170 | 2.73 | – |
| Right Wing of the Republic | 6,249 | 1.30 | – |
| Self-Defence of the Republic of Poland | 5,654 | 1.17 | – |
| Real Politics Union | 4,931 | 1.02 | – |
| Agreement for the Future – CenterLeft | 4,465 | 0.93 | – |
| Libertas Poland | 3,676 | 0.76 | – |
| Polish Labour Party | 2,596 | 0.54 | – |
| Total | 482,382 | 100.00 | 3 |
| Valid votes | 482,382 | 98.50 | |
| Invalid/blank votes | 7,341 | 1.50 | |
| Total votes | 489,723 | 100.00 | |
| Registered voters/turnout | 1,746,095 | 28.05 | |
Source: National Electoral Commission

=== 2014 ===
2014 European Parliament election
| Electoral committee | Votes | % | Seats |
|---|---|---|---|
| Civic Platform | 218,962 | 47.69 | 2 |
| Law and Justice | 117,620 | 25.62 | 1 |
| Democratic Left Alliance – Labour Union | 35,164 | 7.66 | – |
| Congress of the New Right | 30,324 | 6.61 | – |
| Polish People's Party | 14,817 | 3.23 | – |
| Europa Plus—Your Movement | 11,350 | 2.47 | – |
| United Poland | 11,329 | 2.47 | – |
| Poland Together | 9,539 | 2.08 | – |
| National Movement | 5,337 | 1.16 | – |
| The Greens | 2,943 | 0.64 | – |
| Direct Democracy | 1,720 | 0.37 | – |
| Total | 459,105 | 100.00 | 3 |
| Valid votes | 459,105 | 97.18 | |
| Invalid/blank votes | 13,342 | 2.82 | |
| Total votes | 472,447 | 100.00 | |
| Registered voters/turnout | 1,769,312 | 26.70 | |
Source: National Electoral Commission

=== 2019 ===
2019 European Parliament election
| Electoral committee | Votes | % | Seats |
|---|---|---|---|
| European Coalition | 419,182 | 50.66 | 2 |
| Law and Justice | 285,740 | 34.53 | 1 |
| Spring | 50,862 | 6.15 | – |
| Confederation | 33,188 | 4.01 | – |
| Kukiz'15 | 22,114 | 2.67 | – |
| Poland Fair Play | 8,425 | 1.02 | – |
| Lewica Razem | 7,946 | 0.96 | – |
| Total | 827,457 | 100.00 | 3 |
| Valid votes | 827,457 | 99.24 | |
| Invalid/blank votes | 6,327 | 0.76 | |
| Total votes | 833,784 | 100.00 | |
| Registered voters/turnout | 1,765,086 | 47.24 | |
Source: National Electoral Commission

=== 2024 ===
2024 European Parliament election
| Electoral committee | Votes | % | Seats |
|---|---|---|---|
| Civic Coalition | 379,577 | 50.97 | 2 |
| Law and Justice | 208,676 | 28.02 | 1 |
| Confederation | 69,654 | 9.35 | 0 |
| Third Way | 40,139 | 5.39 | 0 |
| The Left | 34,570 | 4.64 | 0 |
| Bezpartyjni Samorządowcy | 8,389 | 1.13 | 0 |
| PolExit | 3,727 | 0.50 | 0 |
| Total | 744,732 | 100.00 | 3 |
| Valid votes | 744,732 | 99.16 | |
| Invalid/blank votes | 6,327 | 0.84 | |
| Total votes | 751,059 | 100.00 | |
| Registered voters/turnout | 1,753,592 | 42.83 | |
Source: National Electoral Commission
