= Kuyavian–Pomeranian (European Parliament constituency) =

Constituency of the European Parliament

Kuyavian-Pomeranian
- European Parliament constituency
- Location among the current constituencies

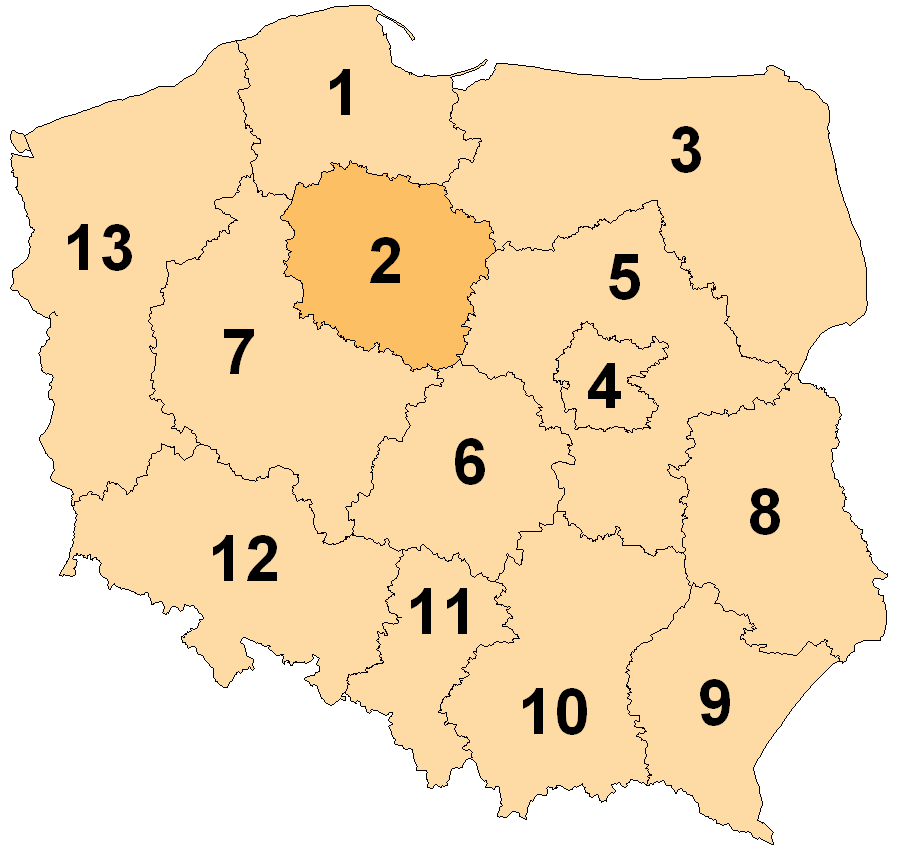
- 2nd constituency in Poland
- Member state: Poland
- Created: 2004
- MEPs: 3 (since 2024); 2 (2019-2024); 3 (2009-2019); 1 (2004-2009)

Kuyavian-Pomeranian (Polish: kujawsko-pomorskie) is a constituency of the European Parliament. It covers the area of the Kuyavian-Pomeranian Voivodeship.

== Nomenclature ==
The relevant Polish legislation ("The Act of 23 January 2004 on Elections to the European Parliament") establishing the constituencies does not give the constituencies formal names. Instead, each constituency has a number, territorial description, and location of the Constituency Electoral Commission. The 2004 Polish National Election Commission and the 2004 European Parliament Election website uses the territorial description when referring to the constituency, not the electoral commission location.

== Members of the European Parliament ==
Election	MEP (party)	MEP (party)	MEP (party)
2004	Tadeusz Zwiefka (PO)	1 seat 2004-2009	
2009	Tadeusz Zwiefka (PO)	Ryszard Czarnecki (PiS)	Janusz Zemke (SLD-UP)
2014	Tadeusz Zwiefka (PO)	Kosma Złotowski (PiS)	Janusz Zemke (SLD-UP)
2019	Radosław Sikorski (KO)	Kosma Złotowski (PiS)	2 seats since 2019
2024	Krzysztof Brejza (KO)	Kosma Złotowski (PiS)	2 seats since 2019

== Election results ==
=== 2004 ===
2004 European Parliament election
Electoral committee	Votes	%	Seats
Civic Platform	70,193	24.02	1
League of Polish Families	46,221	15.82	–
Self-Defence of the Republic of Poland	34,483	11.80	–
Freedom Union	31,436	10.76	–
Democratic Left Alliance – Labour Union	31,330	10.72	–
Law and Justice	26,711	9.14	–
Polish People's Party	20,256	6.93	–
Social Democracy of Poland	14,189	4.86	–
Real Politics Union	4,813	1.65	–
KPEiR–PLD	3,554	1.22	–
Initiative for Poland	3,327	1.14	–
National Electoral Committee	2,061	0.71	–
All-Poland Civic Coalition	1,862	0.64	–
Polish Labour Party	1,801	0.62	–
Total	292,237	100.00	1
Valid votes	292,237	96.59	
Invalid/blank votes	10,305	3.41	
Total votes	302,542	100.00	
Registered voters/turnout	1,618,883	18.69	
Source: PKW

=== 2009 ===
2009 European Parliament election
Electoral committee	Votes	%	Seats
Civic Platform	162,556	43.08	1
Democratic Left Alliance – Labour Union	79,400	21.04	1
Law and Justice	73,183	19.40	1
Polish People's Party	38,092	10.10	–
Self-Defence of the Republic of Poland	6,958	1.84	–
Agreement for the Future – CenterLeft	4,477	1.19	–
Right Wing of the Republic	3,589	0.95	–
Libertas Poland	3,277	0.87	–
Real Politics Union	3,265	0.87	–
Polish Labour Party	2,513	0.67	–
Total	377,310	100.00	3
Valid votes	377,310	97.88	
Invalid/blank votes	8,166	2.12	
Total votes	385,476	100.00	
Registered voters/turnout	1,649,903	23.36	
Source: National Electoral Commission

==== Opinion polling ====
Poll Source	Date administered	Zwiefka (PO)	Czarnecki* (PiS)	Zemke (SLD)	Kłopotek (PSL)	Other	Unknown vote
GfK Polonia	27 March 2009	22%	9%	17%	22%		30%
PBS DGA	25–28 May 2009	49%	18%	16%	10%	7%	

* - in March' opinion polling as PiS' list leader was Kosma Złotowski.

=== 2014 ===
2014 European Parliament election
Electoral committee	Votes	%	Seats
Civic Platform	100,430	27.99	1
Law and Justice	96,663	26.94	1
Democratic Left Alliance – Labour Union	74,833	20.86	1
Polish People's Party	32,507	9.06	–
Congress of the New Right	20,753	5.78	–
Europa Plus—Your Movement	13,998	3.90	–
United Poland	9,065	2.53	–
Poland Together	6,695	1.87	–
National Movement	3,819	1.06	–
Total	358,763	100.00	3
Valid votes	358,763	96.35	
Invalid/blank votes	13,579	3.65	
Total votes	372,342	100.00	
Registered voters/turnout	1,648,127	22.59	
Source: National Electoral Commission

=== 2019 ===
2019 European Parliament election
Electoral committee	Votes	%	Seats
European Coalition	305,362	46.01	1
Law and Justice	260,408	39.24	1
Spring	39,412	5.94	–
Kukiz'15	25,694	3.87	–
Confederation	25,223	3.80	–
Lewica Razem	7,533	1.14	–
Total	663,632	100.00	2
Valid votes	663,632	99.13	
Invalid/blank votes	5,837	0.87	
Total votes	669,469	100.00	
Registered voters/turnout	1,603,561	41.75	
Source: National Electoral Commission

=== 2024 ===
2024 European Parliament election
Electoral committee	Votes	%	Seats
Civic Coalition	379,577	51.06	2
Law and Justice	208,676	28.07	1
Confederation	69,654	9.37	–
Third Way	40,139	5.40	–
The Left	34,570	4.65	–
Bezpartyjni Samorządowcy	8,389	1.13	–
PolExit	2,417	0.33	–
Total	743,422	100.00	3
Valid votes	743,422	99.50	
Invalid/blank votes	3,727	0.50	
Total votes	747,149	100.00	
Registered voters/turnout	1,753,592	42.61	
Source: National Electoral Commission

== See also ==
- European Parliament constituency
- Kuyavian-Pomeranian Voivodeship
