= Jolanta Banach =

Polish politician

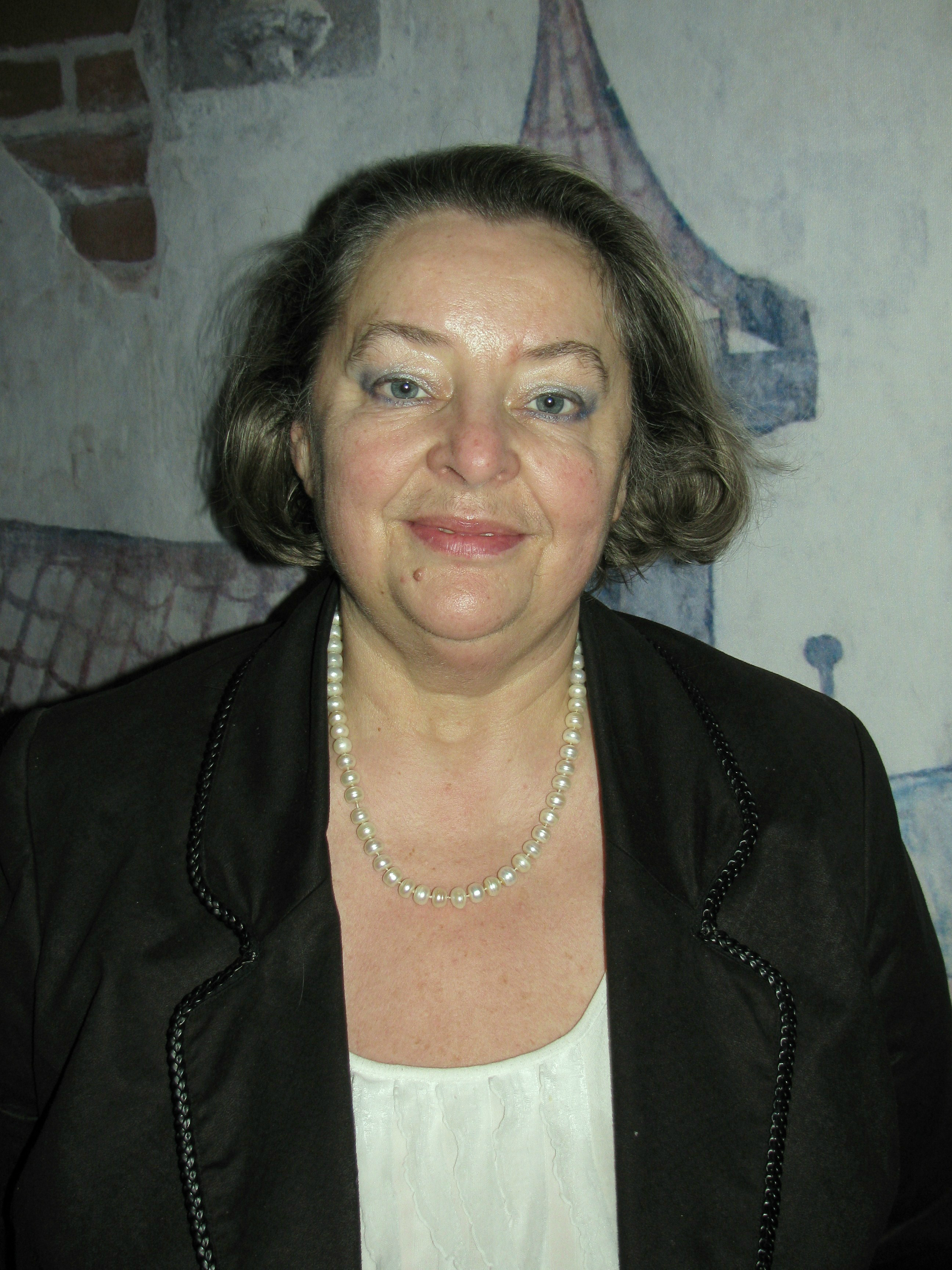

Member of Gdańsk City Council
- Incumbent
- Assumed office 7 May 2024
- In office 21 November 2010 – 16 November 2014

Member of the Sejm
- In office 14 October 1993 – 18 October 2005
- Constituency: 25-Gdańsk

Personal details
- Born: 11 November 1958 (age 67) Lębork, Poland
- Party: New Left (since 2021); Democratic Left Alliance (1993-2021)
- Other political affiliations: The Left (since 2019); Social Democracy of Poland (founding member, 2004-)

Jolanta Maria Banach (born 11 November 1958 in Lębork) is a Polish politician and teacher. A member of the New Left and former member of the Democratic Left Alliance, she was a member of the Sejm for the 2nd, 3rd and 4th terms, from 1993 to 2005. From 2001-2003, she was the Secretary of State in the Ministry of Labor and Social Policy of Poland, and from 2003-2004, the Secretary of State in the Ministry of Economy, Labor and Social Policy of Poland. Banach currently serves on the Gdańsk City Council.

== Biography ==
In 1983, Banach graduated from the Faculty of Humanities of the University of Gdańsk. She worked as a librarian and teacher of Polish. Since 1992, she has been a member of the Democratic Union of Women.

In October 2001, she was appointed secretary of state in the Ministry of Labor and Social Policy in the government of Leszek Miller. Since January 2003, she held the same position in the Ministry of Economy, Labor and Social Policy until it was canceled in February 2004.

During 2004, she also served as the government plenipotentiary for the disabled.

In March 2004, together with Marek Borowski, Banach was among the co-founders of the Polish Social Democracy Party (SDPL), then she took the position of the chairwoman of the SDPL parliamentary club. In the 4th term Sejm, she was a member of the Social Policy and Family Committee.

She ran unsuccessfully in 2005 and 2007 for the Sejm and in 2006 for the Sejmik. In 2006, she was employed as the deputy director of Bursa Gdańska, and in 2015 she took the position of director of this institution.

From June 2007 to February 2010, she chaired the SDPL in the Pomeranian Voivodeship, then remained a member of the party's provincial board. In 2010, still belonging to the SDPL, she was elected from the SLD list to the city council in Gdańsk, where she served from 2010 to 2014.

She later left the SDPL. In 2014, she unsuccessfully ran for the European Parliament from the SLD-UP list.

In the 2019 elections, she was again the SLD candidate for the Sejm.

In 2021, she joined the New Left (joining the SLD faction). In January 2022, she sat on the board of the Pomeranian Voivodeship of the party. She was reelected to the Gdansk city council in 2024.
