= Lublin (European Parliament constituency) =

Constituency of the European Parliament

- European Parliament constituency
- Location among the current constituencies

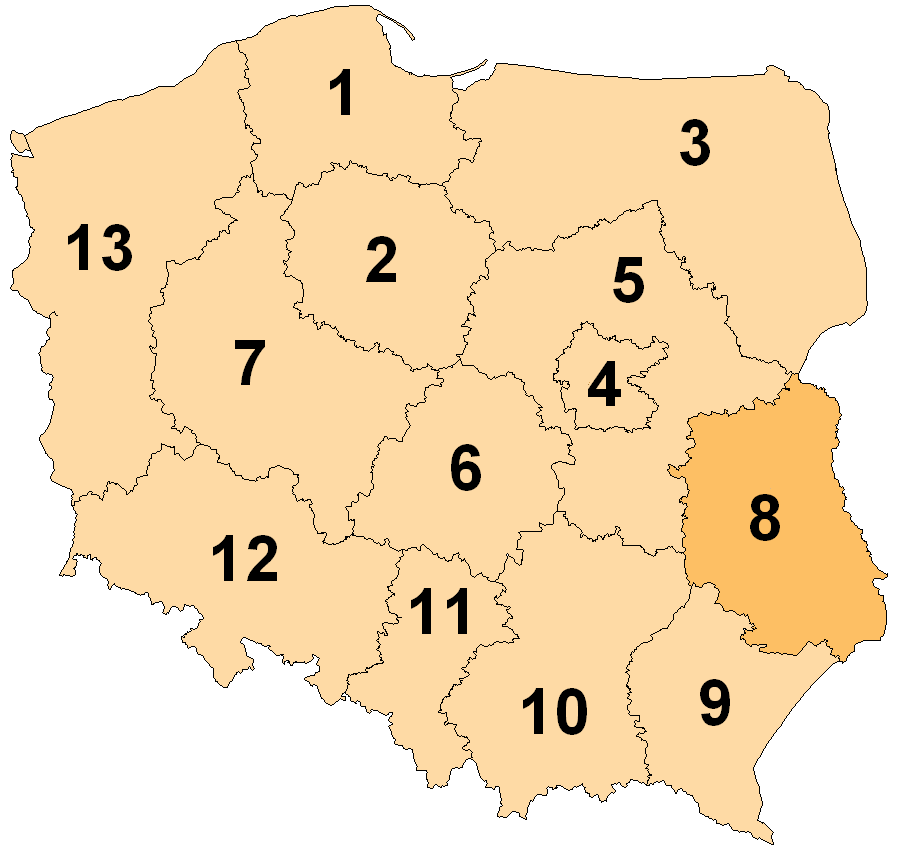
- 8th constituency in Poland
- Member state: Poland
- Created: 2004
- MEPs: 2 (since 2024, 2014-2019, 2009-2011); 3 (2019-2024, 2011-2014); 4 (2004-2009)

Lublin is a constituency represented in the European Parliament. The constituency covers the area of the Lublin Voivodeship.

== Nomenclature ==
The relevant Polish legislation ("The Act of 23 January 2004 on Elections to the European Parliament") establishing the constituencies does not give the constituencies formal names. Instead, each constituency has a number, territorial description, and location of the Constituency Electoral Commission. The 2004 Polish National Election Commission and the 2004 European Parliament Election website uses the territorial description when referring to the constituency, not the electoral commission location.

== Members of the European Parliament ==
Election	MEP (party)	MEP (party)	MEP (party)	MEP (party)
2004	Mirosław Piotrowski (LPR) (PiS)	Zbigniew Zaleski (PO)	Zdzisław Podkański (PSL)	Wiesław Kuc (SRP)
2009	Mirosław Piotrowski (LPR) (PiS)	Lena Kolarska-Bobińska (PO)	2 seats 2009-2011	
2011	Mirosław Piotrowski (LPR) (PiS)	Lena Kolarska-Bobińska (PO)	Arkadiusz Bratkowski (PSL)	3 seats 2011-2014
2013	Mirosław Piotrowski (LPR) (PiS)	Zbigniew Zaleski (PO)	Arkadiusz Bratkowski (PSL)	3 seats 2011-2014
2014	Mirosław Piotrowski (LPR) (PiS)	Krzysztof Hetman (PSL) (KE)	2 seats 2014-2019	
2019	Beata Mazurek (PiS)	Krzysztof Hetman (PSL) (KE)	Elżbieta Kruk (PiS)	3 seats 2019-2024
2023	Beata Mazurek (PiS)	Włodzimierz Karpiński (KE)	Elżbieta Kruk (PiS)	3 seats 2019-2024
2024	Mariusz Kamiński (PiS)	Marta Wcisło (KO)	2 seats since 2024	

== Election results ==
=== 2004 ===
2004 European Parliament election
Electoral committee	Votes	%	Seats
League of Polish Families	82,162	23.60	1
Self-Defence of the Republic of Poland	55,755	16.01	1
Civic Platform	55,017	15.80	1
Polish People's Party	51,056	14.66	1
Law and Justice	33,904	9.74	–
Democratic Left Alliance – Labour Union	25,118	7.21	–
Social Democracy of Poland	14,336	4.12	–
Freedom Union	7,959	2.29	–
National Electoral Committee	7,230	2.08	–
Real Politics Union	4,814	1.38	–
Initiative for Poland	3,310	0.95	–
All-Poland Civic Coalition	2,187	0.63	–
KPEiR–PLD	2,171	0.62	–
Polish Labour Party	1,922	0.55	–
Konfederacja Ruch Obrony Bezrobotnych	1,226	0.35	–
Total	348,167	100.00	4
Valid votes	348,167	97.40	
Invalid/blank votes	9,290	2.60	
Total votes	357,457	100.00	
Registered voters/turnout	1,730,259	20.66	
Source: PKW

=== 2009 ===
2009 European Parliament election
Electoral committee	Votes	%	Seats
Law and Justice	136,986	36.15	1
Civic Platform	112,221	29.61	1
Polish People's Party	51,954	13.71	1
Democratic Left Alliance – Labour Union	24,725	6.52	–
Agreement for the Future – CenterLeft	17,089	4.51	–
Libertas Poland	12,207	3.22	–
Self-Defence of the Republic of Poland	10,297	2.72	–
Right Wing of the Republic	5,890	1.55	–
Real Politics Union	5,259	1.39	–
Polish Labour Party	2,345	0.62	–
Total	378,973	100.00	3
Valid votes	378,973	98.12	
Invalid/blank votes	7,260	1.88	
Total votes	386,233	100.00	
Registered voters/turnout	1,752,645	22.04	
Source: National Electoral Commission

=== 2014 ===
2014 European Parliament election
Electoral committee	Votes	%	Seats
Law and Justice	164,578	41.20	1
Polish People's Party	70,055	17.54	1
Civic Platform	64,889	16.24	–
Congress of the New Right	27,482	6.88	–
Democratic Left Alliance – Labour Union	21,248	5.32	–
Europa Plus—Your Movement	15,720	3.94	–
United Poland	13,932	3.49	–
Poland Together	10,464	2.62	–
National Movement	8,994	2.25	–
Direct Democracy	2,121	0.53	–
Total	399,483	100.00	2
Valid votes	399,483	97.13	
Invalid/blank votes	11,796	2.87	
Total votes	411,279	100.00	
Registered voters/turnout	1,750,992	23.49	
Source: National Electoral Commission

=== 2019 ===
2019 European Parliament election
Electoral committee	Votes	%	Seats
Law and Justice	436,139	58.95	2
European Coalition	208,392	28.17	1
Confederation	32,706	4.42	–
Kukiz'15	29,567	4.00	–
Spring	22,692	3.07	–
Lewica Razem	5,302	0.72	–
Poland Fair Play	5,071	0.69	–
Total	739,869	100.00	3
Valid votes	739,869	98.91	
Invalid/blank votes	8,153	1.09	
Total votes	748,022	100.00	
Registered voters/turnout	1,706,080	43.84	
Source: National Electoral Commission

=== 2024 ===
2024 European Parliament election
Electoral committee	Votes	%	Seats
Law and Justice	292,019	47.16	1
Civic Coalition	161,002	26.00	1
Confederation	93,542	15.11	0
Third Way	43,013	6.95	0
The Left	20,381	3.29	0
Bezpartyjni Samorządowcy	7,342	1.19	0
PolExit	1,864	0.30	0
Total	619,163	100.00	2
Valid votes	619,163	99.42	
Invalid/blank votes	3,586	0.58	
Total votes	622,749	100.00	
Registered voters/turnout	1,623,766	38.35	
Source: National Electoral Commission
