= Lists of Polish politicians =

The following lists of Polish politicians and party members are listed by party:

- List of Centre Agreement politicians
- List of Civic Platform politicians
- List of Democratic Left Alliance politicians
- List of Democratic Party – demokraci.pl politicians
- List of Greens 2004 members
- List of Law and Justice politicians
- List of League of Polish Families politicians
- List of Liberal Democratic Congress politicians
- List of Polish Communist Party politicians
- List of Polish People's Party politicians
- List of Polish Socialist Party politicians
- List of Polish United Workers' Party members
- List of Polish Workers' Party politicians
- List of Social Democracy of Poland politicians
- List of Solidarity Electoral Action politicians
