= Alliance for the Future =

Alliance for the Future may refer to:

- Alliance for the Future of Austria, a political party formed in 2005
- Alliance for the Future of Kosovo, a political party formed in 2001
- Alliance for the Future (Peru), a 2006 political alliance
- Alliance for the Future (Poland), a 2009 political alliance
- Alliance for the Future (Czech Republic), a 2016 political party
