= Kierzkowski =

Kierzkowski (feminine: Kierzkowska) is a surname of Polish origin. Notable people with the surname include:

- Alexandre-Édouard Kierzkowski (1816–1870), Canadian civil engineer and politician
- Ewa Kierzkowska (born 1964), Polish politician
- Henryk Kierzkowski (born 1943), Polish economist
- Janusz Kierzkowski (1947–2011), Polish cyclist
- Kazimierz Kierzkowski (1890–1942), Polish political and social activist
- Urszula Kierzkowska (born 1967), Polish politician and jurist

== See also ==
- Karczemka Kierzkowska, a village in Pomeranian Voivodeship, Poland
