= Marta Wcisło =

Polish politician (born 1969)

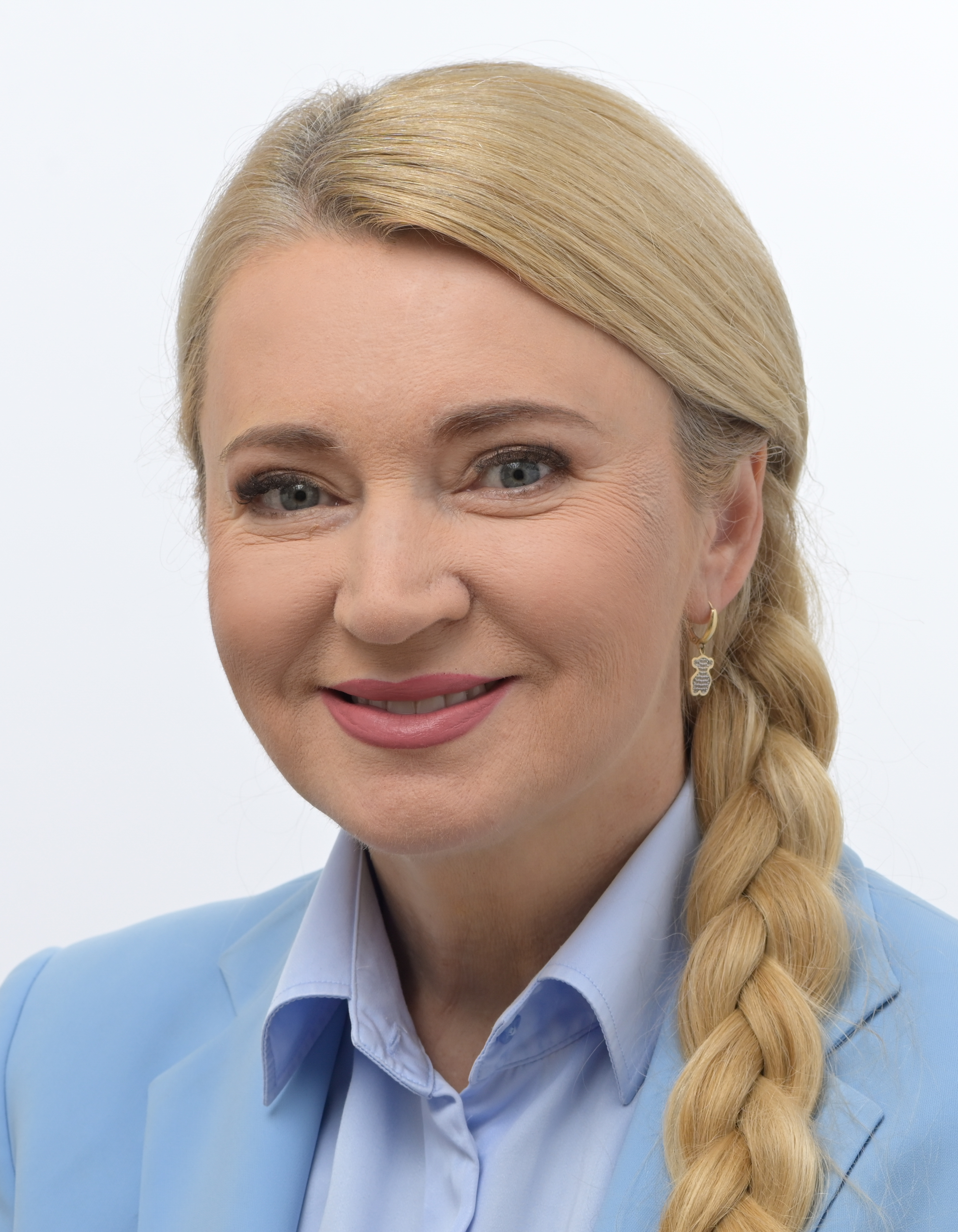
- Official portrait, 2024

Member of the European Parliament for Poland
- Incumbent
- Assumed office 16 July 2024

Member of the 9th Sejm
- In office 12 November 2019 – 15 July 2024

Personal details
- Born: February 26, 1969 (age 57) Kraśnik
- Party: Civic Coalition
- Education: Maria Curie-Skłodowska University

Marta Anna Wcisło (born 26 February 1969) is a Polish educator, politician and member of the Civic Coalition.

== Life and career ==
Wcisło was born in Kraśnik.

She has been a member of the Sejm since 12 November 2019 after winning 15,062 votes in the 2019 Polish parliamentary elections. In 2023 parliamentary election she was reelected receiving 68,449 votes. In the 2024 EU elections, Wcisło was elected as an MEP for Lublin constituency, with 103,740 votes (16.75% of the vote share).

== See also ==
- 9th term Sejm and 10th term Senate of Poland
- List of Sejm members (2019–23)
