= Izabella Sierakowska =

Polish politician (1946–2021)

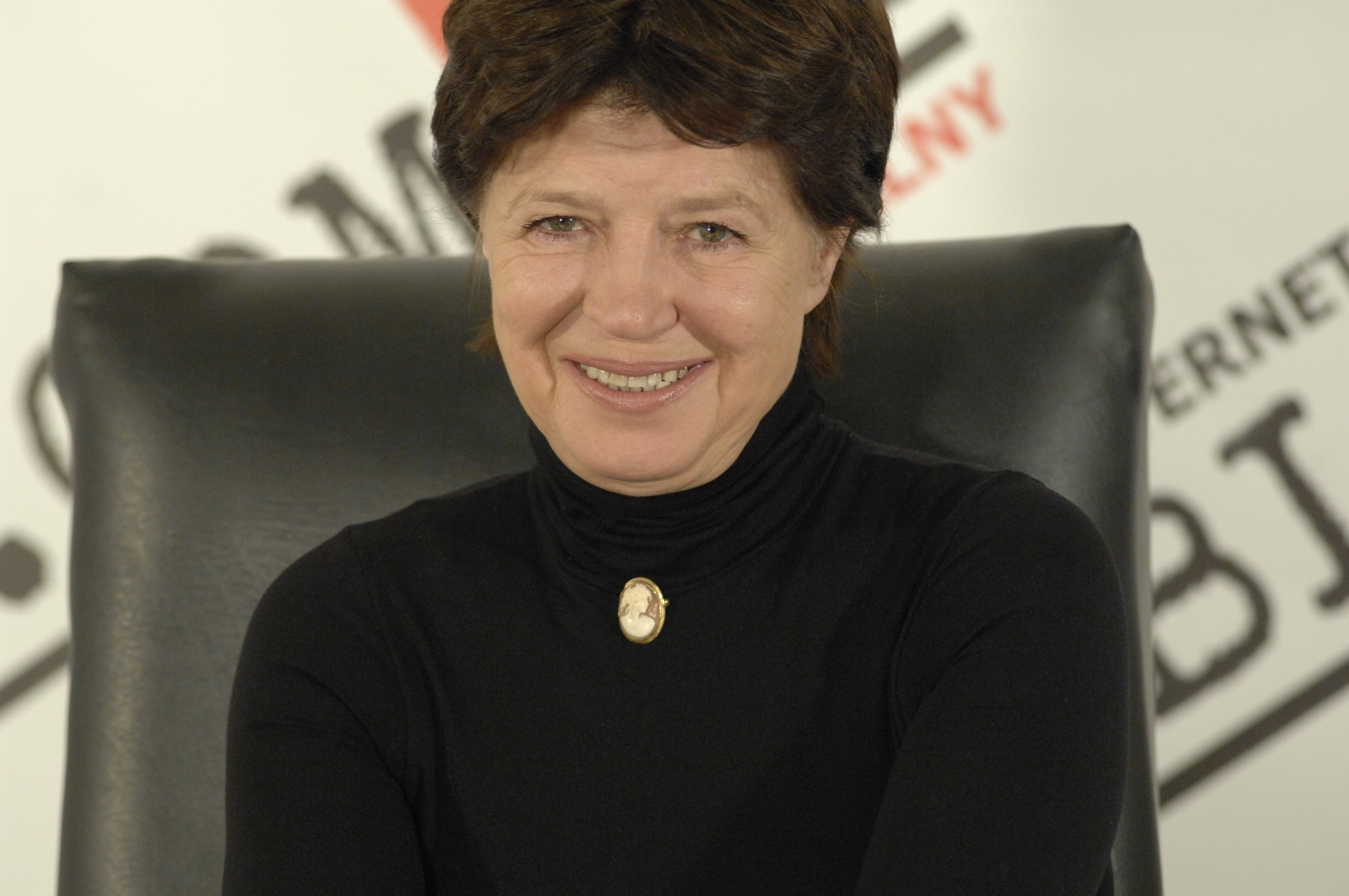

Sejm Member from 6th District
- In office 28 June 1989 – 18 October 2005
- Constituency: Lublin (6th district)

Sejm Member from 6th District
- In office 5 November 2007 – 7 November 2011

Personal details
- Born: 22 September 1946 Góra Śląska, People's Republic of Poland
- Died: 31 March 2021 (aged 74)
- Party: PUWP (1970–1990); SdRP (1990–1999); SLD (1999–2004); SdPl (from 2004)
- Spouse: Edward Sierakowski

Izabella Antonina Sierakowska, née Kruszyńska (Polish pronunciation: [izaˈbɛlla ɕɛraˈkɔfska]; 22 September 1946 – 31 March 2021) was a Polish politician and one of the leading and the most popular persons of the Polish left.

== Life ==
She was born in Góra Śląska. Her parents, Krystyna and Zbigniew Kruszyńskis were refugees from Vilnius. Zbigniew was a soldier, who fought in the Polish resistance during occupation and later continued his career. Sierakowska lived with her family in various places such as Siedlce, Łódź.

She graduated from college in Rzeszów in Russian philology. She worked as a teacher since 1972 in prestige high school (liceum) named after Stanisław Staszic.

In 1970 she joined then-ruling communist Polish United Workers' Party and was a delegate to the 10th PUWP convention in 1987.

In 1989 she was elected to the Contract Sejm as PUWP member. After dissolution of the party she joined, as most former members did, newly formed Social Democracy of Poland (SdPl) and later Democratic Left Alliance (SLD).

Sierakowska remained a Sejm Member until 2005 elections, when she lost her seat.

She was an outspoken supporter of abortion rights, separation of church and state, and other leftist values.

Sierakowska was also a critic of the Leszek Miller government and his role as SLD Leader. She urged a replacement of Miller with former Prime Minister Józef Oleksy.

During her last term as MP, she served as Vice Chair of the National Defense Committee. Previously she was notable as one of the co-authors of the new constitution, which was adopted in 1997.

Sierakowska left SLD with group of other members led by Sejm Marshal Marek Borowski and founded Social Democracy of Poland (SdPl). SdPl suffered a massive defeat in the 2005 Sejm election and lost all seats, when SLD won fourth place.

She remained one of the SdPl leaders, and ran for Presidency of Lublin, where she had lived for many years, and won first place in the first round with 25.31% of vote. Before municipal elections, SdPl, SLD and the Democrats joined forces as Left and the Democrats coalition, a new political power still active. In turnout Sierakowska lost to Civic Platform candidate Adam Wasilewski. Despite defeat, she was elected the same year to the Lublin Voivodeship Sejmik.

In 2007 she returned to the Sejm after being elected from Lewica i Demokraci list. She finished her term in 2011.
