= Labour Union (Poland) =

Labour Union Unia Pracy
- Leader: Waldemar Witkowski
- Founded: 7 June 1992
- Merger of: Democratic-Social Movement; Polish Social Democratic Union; Labour Solidarity
- Headquarters: Ul. Nowogrodzka 4, 00-513 Warsaw
- Youth wing: Labour Youth
- Ideology: Social democracy Progressivism; Pro-Europeanism
- Political position: Centre-left
- National affiliation: The Left
- European Parliament group: Progressive Alliance of Socialists and Democrats
- Colours: Red
- Sejm: 0 / 460
- Senate: 1 / 100
- European Parliament: 0 / 52
- Regional assemblies: 0 / 552

Website
- uniapracy.org.pl

Labour Union (Polish: Unia Pracy, UP) is a minor social-democratic political party in Poland. It was a member of the Party of European Socialists (PES) until April 2022.

== History ==
Labour Union was formed in June 1992. The party contested the 1993 parliamentary elections, obtaining 7.28% of the popular vote and had 41 representatives elected to the lower house (Sejm). In the following parliamentary elections of 1997, UP received only 4.74% of votes, thereby falling short of the required 5% threshold for election to the Sejm. At the 2001 parliamentary elections, UP entered into an electoral alliance with the major Polish social-democratic party Democratic Left Alliance (SLD), and managed to get 16 of its members elected to parliament. Some of those members subsequently left UP to join the newly created Social Democracy of Poland (SDPL), a splinter group from the SLD. In May 2004, UP signed an alliance with SDPL, in which both parties agreed to jointly contest the following parliamentary elections under the SDPL banner, and to support the candidacy of Marek Borowski in the 2005 presidential election. At the 2005 parliamentary elections, SDPL gained only 3.9% of the vote, which was insufficient for the alliance to achieve parliamentary representation.

In 2006, UP joined SLD, SDPL and the liberal Democratic Party – demokraci.pl to form a centre-left electoral alliance named Left and Democrats (LiD) for the upcoming local elections. This electoral alliance was maintained for the 2007 parliamentary elections, and LiD came in third place with 13.2% of the vote, which saw 53 of its candidates elected to the Sejm. Unfortunately for UP, the party was the only one of the four component parties of the LiD alliance not to have any of its candidates elected.

In the 2011 parliamentary elections, its candidates joined the electoral lists of SLD. Again, none of them were elected.

They managed, however, to win one seat on the European Parliament elections in 2004; the party held it in the elections in 2009 and 2014.

In July 2015, the party joined the Zjednoczona Lewica (United Left) electoral alliance for the 2015 parliamentary elections. The alliance received 7.6% vote of the vote in the elections, below the 8% electoral threshold leaving it with no parliamentary representation. The alliance was dissolved in February 2016.

In the 2019 parliamentary election, Labour Union candidates ran on the Civic Coalition’s electoral lists; again, none of their candidates managed to get elected.

== Election results ==
=== Presidential ===
Election	Candidate	1st round		2nd round	
Election	Candidate	# of overall votes	% of overall vote	# of overall votes	% of overall vote
1995	Tadeusz Zieliński	631,432	3.5 (#6)		
2000	Supported Aleksander Kwaśniewski	9,485,224	53.9 (#1)		
2005	none				
2010	Supported Grzegorz Napieralski	2,299,870	13.7 (#3)		
2015	none				
2020	Waldemar Witkowski	27,290	0.1 (#10)		
2025	Magdalena Biejat	829,361	4.23 (#7)		

=== Sejm ===
Election	Votes	%	Seats	+/–	Government
1993	1,005,004	7.3 (#4)	41 / 460	New	SLD-PSL (1993) (confidence and supply)
1993	1,005,004	7.3 (#4)	41 / 460	New	SLD-PSL (1994-1997)
1997	620,611	4.7 (#6)	0 / 460	▼41	Extra-parliamentary
2001	5,342,519	41.0 (#1)	16 / 460	New	SLD-UP-PSL (2001-2003)
2001	5,342,519	41.0 (#1)	16 / 460	New	SLD-UP (2003-2004)
2001	5,342,519	41.0 (#1)	16 / 460	New	SLD-UP-SDPL (2004-2005)
2001	As part of the SLD-UP coalition, that won 216 seats in total.				
2005	459,380	3.9 (#7)	0 / 460	▼16	Extra-parliamentary
2005	In an electoral alliance with Social Democracy of Poland and Greens 2004, that won no seats.				
2007	2,122,981	13.2 (#3)	0 / 460	0	Extra-parliamentary
2007	As part of the Left and Democrats coalition, that won 53 seats in total.				
2011	1,184,303	8.24 (#5)	0 / 460	0	Extra-parliamentary
2011	In an electoral alliance with Democratic Left Alliance, that won 27 seats in total.				
2015	1,147,102	7.55 (#5)	0 / 460	0	Extra-parliamentary
2015	As part of the United Left coalition, that won no seats.				
2019	5,060,355	27.4 (#2)	0 / 460	0	Extra-parliamentary
2019	As part of Civic Coalition, that won 134 seats in total.				
2023	1,859,018	8.6 (#4)	0 / 460	0	Extra-parliamentary
2023	As part of The Left, that won 26 seats in total.				

=== Senate ===
Election	Seats	+/–
1993	2 / 100	New
1997	0 / 100	▼2
2001	5 / 100	▲5
2001	As part of the SLD-UP coalition.	
2005	0 / 100	▼5
2007	0 / 100	Steady
2023	1 / 100	▲1
2023	As part of Senate Pact 2023.	

=== European Parliament ===
Election	Votes	%	Seats	+/−	EP Group
2004	569,311	9.35 (#5)	1 / 54	New	PES
2004	As part of the SLD-UP coalition, that won 5 seats in total.				
2009	908,765	12.34 (#3)	1 / 50	0	S&D
2009	As part of the SLD-UP coalition, that won 7 seats in total.				
2014	667,319	9.97 (#3)	1 / 51	0	S&D
2014	As part of the SLD-UP coalition, that won 5 seats in total.				
2019	168,745	1.24 (#6)	0 / 52	▼1	−
2019	As part of the Left Together coalition, that didn't win any seat.				
2024	741,071	6.30 (#5)	0 / 53	0	−
2024	As part of The Left coalition, that won 3 seats in total.				

=== Regional assemblies ===
Election year	% of vote	# of overall seats won	+/–
1998	12.0 (#3)	89 / 855	▲89
1998	As part of the Social Alliance.		
2002	24.6 (#1)	189 / 561	▲100
2002	As Democratic Left Alliance – Labour Union.		
2006	14.2 (#4)	66 / 561	▼123
2006	As part of the Left and Democrats.		
2010	15.2 (#4)	85 / 561	▲19
2010	As Democratic Left Alliance – Labour Union.		
2014	8.8 (#4)	28 / 555	▼57
2014	As part of SLD Lewica Razem.		
2018	6.6 (#4)	11 / 552	▼17
2018	As part of SLD Lewica Razem.		

Timeline of Polish socialist/social democratic parties after 1986
•Polish Socialist Party (1987–)
•Polish Social Democratic Union (1990–1992)
•Social Democracy of the Republic of Poland (1990–1999)
•Democratic-Social Movement (1991–1992)
•Labour Union (1992–)
•National Party of Retirees and Pensioners (1994–)
•Democratic Left Alliance (1999–2021)
•Reason Party (2002–2013)
•Social Democracy of Poland (2004–)
•Freedom and Equality (2005–)
•Polish Left (2008–)
•Left Together (2015–)
•Spring (2019–2021)
•New Left (2021–)

== Leaders ==
- Waldemar Witkowski
- Marek Pol

== Members of European Parliament ==
- Adam Gierek (2004–2019)

== Important former members ==
- Ryszard Bugaj, left in 1998
- Zbigniew Bujak, until c.1997
- Tomasz Nałęcz, left in 2004 to newly created Social Democracy of Poland
- Aleksander Małachowski, died January 26, 2004
- Izabela Jaruga-Nowacka, left in 2005, founded Union of the Left
