= Krzysztof Zaremba =

Polish politician

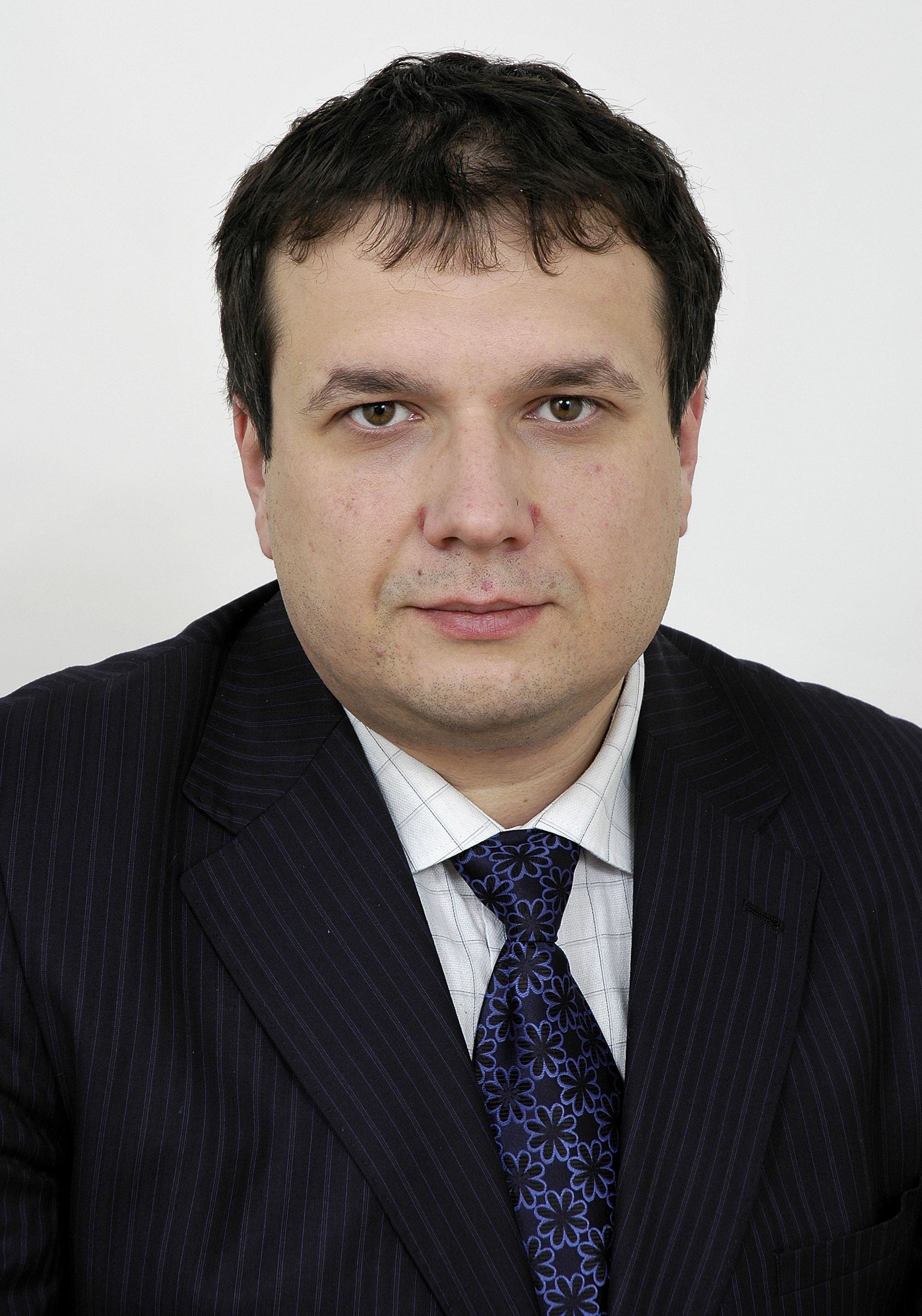

member of Sejm 2005-2007
- In office 25 September 2005 – ?

Personal details
- Born: 12 December 1972 (age 53)
- Party: Civic Platform

Krzysztof Piotr Zaremba (born 12 December 1972 in Szczecin) is a Polish politician. He was elected to Sejm on 25 September 2005, getting 22,812 votes in 41 Szczecin district as a candidate from the Civic Platform list.

He was also a member of Sejm 2001-2005.

== See also ==
- Members of Polish Sejm 2005-2007
