= Dariusz Rosati =

Polish professor of economics and politician

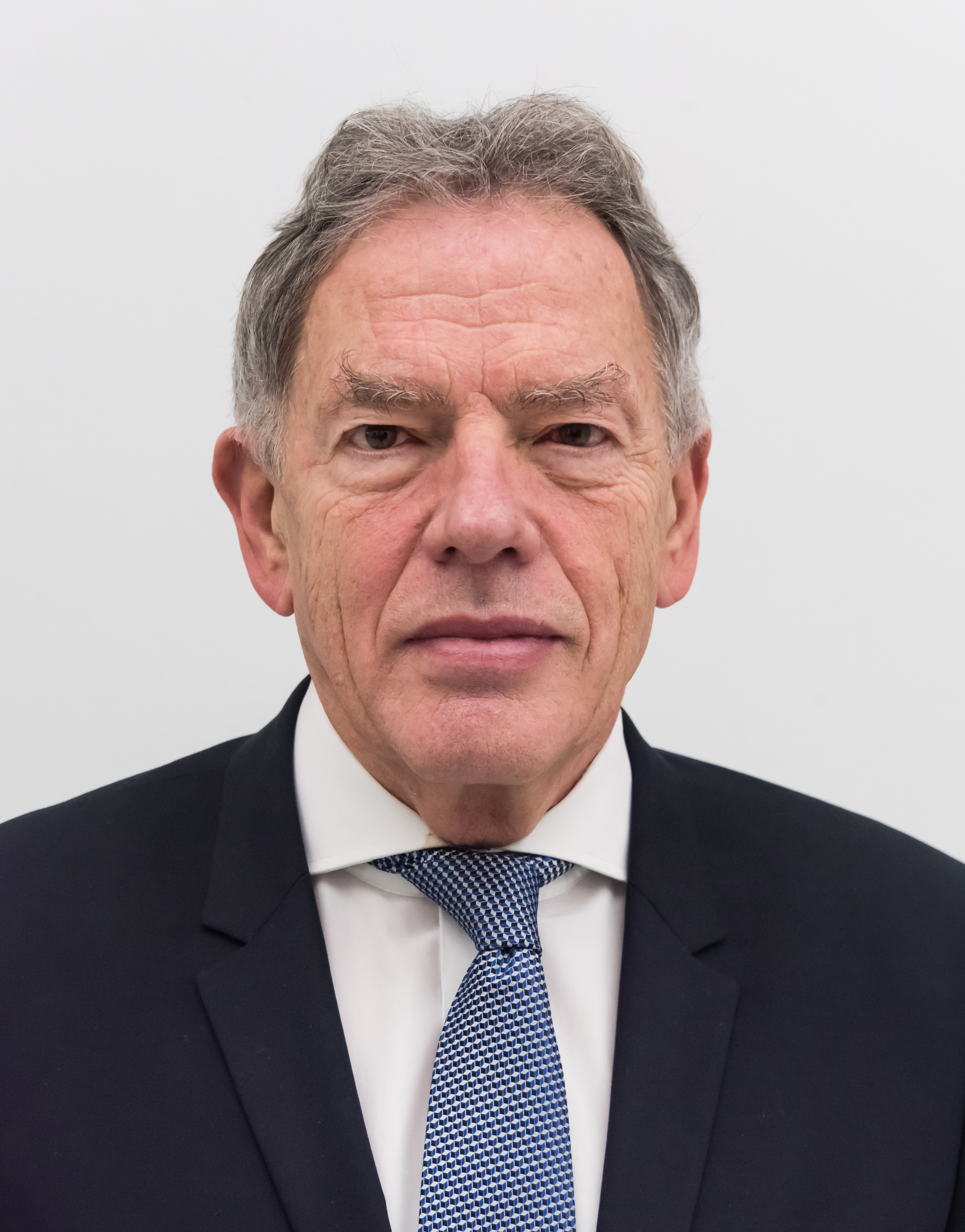
- Sejm portrait from 2019

Member of the European Parliament for Warsaw
- In office 20 July 2004 – 1 July 2009

Member of the European Parliament for Lubusz and West Pomeranian
- In office 20 July 2014 – 1 July 2019

Minister of Foreign Affairs
- In office 29 December 1995 – 31 October 1997
- President: Aleksander Kwaśniewski
- Prime Minister: Józef Oleksy; Włodzimierz Cimoszewicz
- Preceded by: Władysław Bartoszewski
- Succeeded by: Bronisław Geremek

Personal details
- Born: Gaetano Dario Rosati; 8 August 1946 (age 80) Radom, Poland
- Citizenship: Polish; Italian (until 1956)
- Party: Polish United Workers' Party (1966–1990); Independent (1990-1995); Democratic Left Alliance (1995-2004); Social Democracy of Poland (2004–2009); Independent (since 2009)
- Other political affiliations: Progressive Alliance of Socialists and Democrats (2004-2009); European People's Party (2014–2019); Civic Coalition (since 2018)
- Spouse: Teresa Rosati (since 1971)
- Children: 2 (Marcin and Weronika)
- Education: SGH Warsaw School of Economics
- Profession: Economist

Dariusz Kajetan Rosati ['darjuʂ rɔsati] (born 8 August 1946 as Gaetano Dario Rosati) is a Polish professor of economics and a politician who served as a member of the European Parliament from 2004–2009 and 2014-2019, and a deputy of the Sejm from 2011-2014 and 2019-2023.

== Biography ==
=== Academic ===
Dariusz Rosati graduated from the Faculty of International Trade at the SGH Warsaw School of Economics in 1969 and immediately afterwards started working there as an assistant. In 1973 he defended his doctoral thesis and in 1978 he received his habilitacja in economic sciences. He has been a professor of economics since 1990.

He is a supporter of a united Europe, the author of numerous publications on European integration and the rector of Lazarski School of Commerce and Law in Warsaw (Wyższa Szkoła Handlu i Prawa im. Łazarskiego w Warszawie).

=== Political ===
From 1966–1990 he was a member of Polish United Workers' Party (PZPR) and in the 1980s he was an economic adviser to Mieczysław Rakowski's government, the last such government of the communist Polish People's Republic (PRL). In the 1990s he was a supporter (but not a member) of the post-communist parties, first Democratic Left Alliance (SLD), and today Social Democratic Party of Poland (SDPL).

Dariusz Rosati was a co-founder and director of the Global Economy Institute (Instytut Gospodarki Światowej) and the Institute of Economic Situations and Prices (Instytut Koniunktur i Cen). He worked as an expert in various international organisations, including the Economic Commission for Europe of the United Nations in Geneva and adviser to the Chairman of the European Commission in Brussels.

He was the Minister of Foreign Affairs in the cabinets of Józef Oleksy and Włodzimierz Cimoszewicz (both SLD), and more recently he was a member of the Polish Council of Monetary Policies (Rada Polityki Pieniężnej).

In the European elections on 13 June 2004 he was elected as a MEP for the SDPL in constituency No. 4 Warsaw and received 76,834 votes (11.94%). In 2014 he was once more elected to the European Parliament and joined the European People's Party Group (EPP Group). He represented the Lubuskie Region as well as Western Pomerania. He was a member of the ECON Committee as well as the PANA Committee, where he also served at the EPP's Coordinator.

In 2009 he founded Alliance for the Future, however the party was very short-lived.

In 2019, after failing to be re-elected as a MEP, he was subsequently elected as a deputy of the Sejm for the Civic Platform (PO) in constituency No. 19 Warsaw with 25,061 votes. In 2021, he became a full member of the Civic Platform, having co-operated with said party since 2011.

=== Alleged collaboration with communist secret service ===
In November 2007, the Institute of National Remembrance (IPN) said that Dariusz Rosati was registered as a secret collaborator "candidate" and "protection" by the Ministry of Interior I Department and II Department. Later on he was registered as an operational contact. However, in July 2007 Dariusz Rosati has made a statement in which he denied that cooperation went beyond sporadic contacts. His vetting (lustracja) declaration was approved by the Ombudsman of the Public Interest and prosecutor of the IPN. Thus he was not a secret collaborator at any time during his life.

== Personal life ==
Dariusz Rosati's father, the Italian-born Angelo, was held as a prisoner of war in Poland during World War II, and after the war briefly settled in Łódź. His mother, Wanda, worked as a forced labourer in Nazi Germany. His parents divorced shortly after his birth, and his father left for France. When Rosati was ten years old, his mother renounced his Italian citizenship on his behalf, and also Polonised and rearranged his name.

Rosati met his future wife Teresa (born 1946) while studying at university, and married in 1971. They have two children, a son (Marcin) and a daughter (Weronika).

== See also ==
- 2004 European Parliament election in Poland
