= Marek Wikiński =

Polish politician

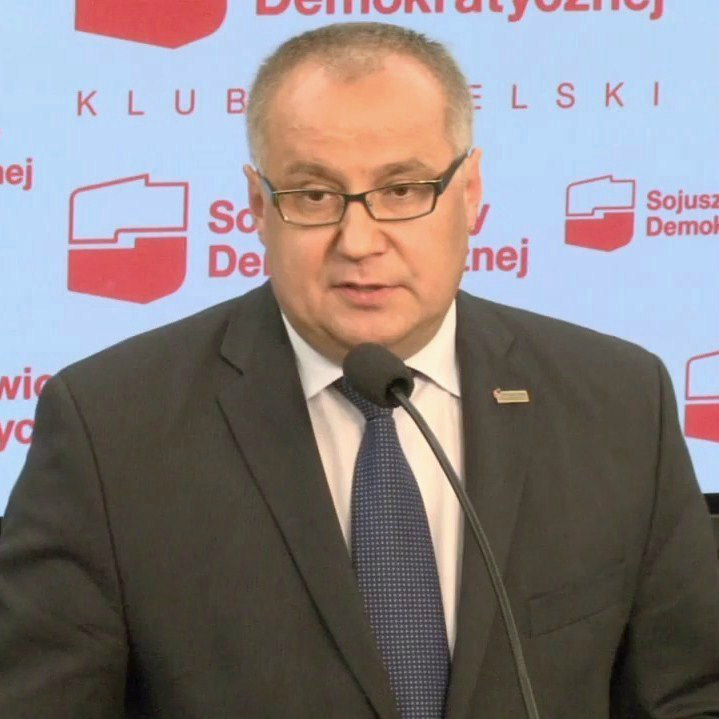

Member of Sejm
- In office 20 October 1997 – 8 November 2011

Personal details
- Born: May 23, 1966 (age 59) Sochaczew, Poland
- Party: Democratic Left Alliance

Marek Michał Wikiński (born 23 May 1966 in Sochaczew) is a Polish politician. He was elected to the Sejm on 25 September 2005, getting 8,671 votes in 17 Radom district as a candidate from the Democratic Left Alliance list.

He was also a member of Sejm 1997-2001 and Sejm 2001-2005.

== See also ==
- Members of Polish Sejm 2005-2007
