= Daniel Pawłowiec =

Polish politician and journalist

member of Sejm 2005-2007
- In office 25 September 2005 – 2007

Personal details
- Born: 7 November 1978 (age 47)
- Party: League of Polish Families

Daniel Mirosław Pawłowiec (born 7 November 1978 in Szczecin) is a Polish politician and journalist. He was a deputy in the Sejm V term and was a deputy minister in the government of Jaroslaw Kaczynski.

== To 2005 ==
Pawlowiec joined the All-Polish Youth, the youth wing of the League of Polish Families in 1995. He worked as a journalist on the daily newspaper "Nasz Dziennik" between 1999 and 2002, then became the director of the Parliamentary press office of the League of Polish Families from 2002 to 2005. During this period he was on Warsaw City Council. He became a member of TVP3, the third channel of the Polish television station TVP, in 2003 and studied at the Faculty of Journalism and Political Science, University of Warsaw, graduating in 2005.

== 2005 to 2008 ==
He ran for election to the Sieradz 11 constituency in 2005 as a candidate for the League of Polish Families and was elected, getting 5685 votes. From 20 October 2006 to 11 January 2007 he was Sekretarz stanu (state secretary) in the Chancellery of Prime Minister of Poland, then to 26 July 2007 he was state secretary in the Office of the Committee for European Integration. He was dismissed for criticizing the Minister of Foreign Affairs Anna Fotyga and lost his seat in the elections that year.

== 2009 ==
He was named as head officer of the Polish branch of Libertas on 2 February 2009.

== See also ==
- Members of Polish Sejm 2005-2007
