= List of Democratic Party – demokraci.pl politicians =

A list of notable Polish politicians of the Democratic Party – demokraci.pl (Polish: Partia Demokratyczna – demokraci.pl).

== B ==
- Marek Belka

== C ==
- Marek Czarnecki
- Mirosław Czech

== E ==
- Marek Edelman

== F ==
- Władysław Frasyniuk

== G ==
- Bronisław Geremek

== H ==
- Jerzy Hausner

== K ==
- Jan Kułakowski

== L ==
- Bogdan Lis

== M ==
- Tadeusz Mazowiecki

== O ==
- Janusz Onyszkiewicz

== P ==
- Antoni Piechniczek
- Krzysztof Pusz

== S ==
- Dorota Simonides
- Robert Smoktunowicz

== W ==
- Jan Widacki

== Ś ==
- Marcin Święcicki
