= Janusz Zemke =

Polish politician

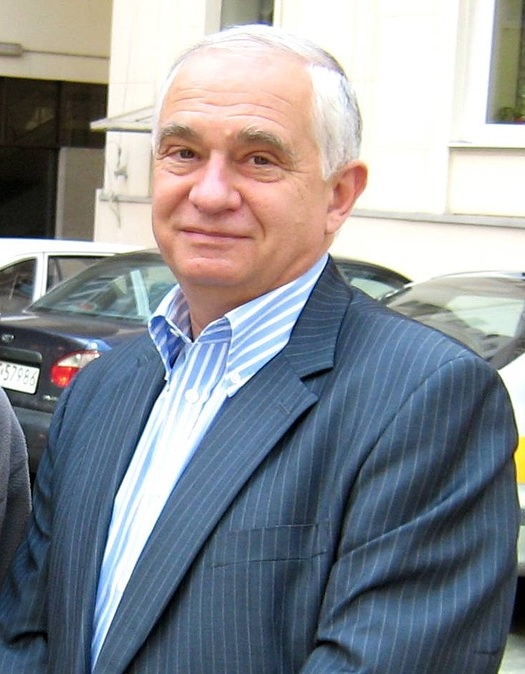

Deputy Minister of National Defence
- In office 19 October 2001 – 18 October 2005

Member of Sejm
- In office 4 June 1989 – 10 June 2009

Member of the European Parliament for Kuyavian–Pomeranian
- In office 14 July 2009 – 1 July 2019
- Parliamentary group: S&D

Personal details
- Born: 24 February 1949 (age 77) Kowalewo Pomorskie, Poland
- Party: Democratic Left Alliance

Janusz Władysław Zemke (pronounced [ˈjanuʂ ˈzɛmkɛ]; born 24 February 1949 in Kowalewo Pomorskie) is a Polish politician. He was elected to the Sejm on 25 September 2005, getting 33,672 votes in 4 Bydgoszcz district as a candidate from the Democratic Left Alliance list.

He was a member of PRL Sejm 1989-1991, Sejm 1991-1993, Sejm 1993-1997, Sejm 1997-2001, and Sejm 2001-2005.

== See also ==
- Members of Polish Sejm 2005-2007
