= European Parliament constituency =

Electoral district for a European Parliament seat

Members of the European Parliament (MEPs) are elected by the population of the member states of the European Union (EU). The European Electoral Act 2002 allows member states the choice to allocate electoral subdivisions or constituencies (French: circonscriptions électorales; German: Wahlkreise; Italian: circoscrizioni elettorali; Swedish: valkretsar) for the European Parliament elections in several different ways.

Most EU countries operate a single national constituency which elects MEPs for the whole country. Belgium and Ireland are each subdivided into constituencies, with electoral results calculated separately in each constituency. Germany, Italy and Poland are each subdivided into electoral districts, with the number of representatives determined at the national level after each election in proportion to the votes cast in each district.

In Germany, political parties are entitled to present lists of candidates either at Länder or national level.

Currently, all constituencies use various forms of proportional representation (PR), except the single-seat German-speaking electoral college in Belgium, which uses first-past-the-post. The parliament as a whole is not PR, because seats are apportioned between member states by degressive proportionality.

== List of constituencies ==
Current constituencies

Constituency	Member State	Area/Community	Seats		Seats country total	Population, 2012 (thousands)		Area (km^{2})	
Constituency	Member State	Area/Community	At election	Current	Current	Total	Per cur. seat	Total	Per cur. seat
Austria	Austria	(Full country)	18	19	19	8,430	444	83,879	4,415
Dutch-speaking electoral college	Belgium	Flemish Community	12	12	21	6,389	532	13,521	1,127
French-speaking electoral college	Belgium	French Community of Belgium	8	8	21	4,663	583	16,152	2,019
German-speaking electoral college	Belgium	German-speaking Community of Belgium	1	1	21	77	77	854	854
Bulgaria	Bulgaria	(Full country)	17	17	17	7,306	430	110,900	6,524
Croatia	Croatia	(Full country)	11	12	12	4,269	356	56,594	4,716
Cyprus	Cyprus	(Full country)	6	6	6	864	144	9,251	1,542
Czech Republic	Czech Republic	(Full country)	21	21	21	10,511	501	78,866	3,756
Denmark	Denmark	(Full country)	13	14	14	5,592	399	42,916	3,065
Estonia	Estonia	(Full country)	6	7	7	1,323	189	45,227	6,461
Finland	Finland	(Full country)	13	14	14	5,414	387	338,435	24,174
France	France	(Full country)	74	79	79	66,233	838	656,412	8,309
Germany	Germany	Full country, parties can opt for separate lists in the 16 Bundesländer	96	96	96	81,932	853	357,162	3,720
Greece	Greece	(Full country)	21	21	21	11,093	528	131,957	6,284
Hungary	Hungary	(Full country)	21	21	21	9,920	472	93,024	4,430
Dublin	Ireland	Dublin and counties Dún Laoghaire–Rathdown, Fingal and South Dublin	3	4	14	1,271	318	921	230
Midlands–North-West	Ireland	Counties Cavan, Donegal, Galway, Kildare, Laois, Leitrim, Longford, Louth, Mayo, Meath, Monaghan, Offaly, Roscommon, Sligo and Westmeath; and the city of Galway	4	5	14	1,635	409	37,282	9,321
South	Ireland	Counties Carlow, Clare, Cork, Kilkenny, Kerry, Limerick, Tipperary, Waterford, Wexford and Wicklow; and the cities of Cork, Limerick and Waterford	4	5	14	1,675	335	31,935	6,387
North-West	Italy	Aosta Valley, Liguria, Lombardy, Piedmont	20	20	76	15,807	790	57,928	2,896
North-East	Italy	Emilia-Romagna, Friuli-Venezia Giulia, Trentino-Alto Adige/Südtirol, Veneto	14	15	76	11,482	765	62,327	4,155
Central	Italy	Latium, Marche, Tuscany, Umbria	14	15	76	11,637	776	58,084	3,872
Southern	Italy	Abruzzo, Apulia, Basilicata, Calabria, Campania, Molise	17	18	76	13,975	776	73,800	4,100
Islands	Italy	Sardinia, Sicily	8	8	76	6,639	830	49,932	6,242
Latvia	Latvia	(Full country)	8	8	8	2,034	254	64,573	8,072
Lithuania	Lithuania	(Full country)	11	11	11	2,988	272	65,300	5,936
Luxembourg	Luxembourg	(Full country)	6	6	6	531	88	2,586	431
Malta	Malta	(Full country)	6	6	6	420	70	316	53
Netherlands	Netherlands	(Full country)	26	29	29	16,755	578	41,540	1,432
Pomeranian	Poland	Pomeranian Voivodeship	3	3	52	2,287	762	18,310	6,103
Kuyavian-Pomeranian	Poland	Kuyavian-Pomeranian Voivodeship	2	2	52	2,097	1,049	17,972	8,986
Podlaskie and Warmian-Masurian	Poland	Podlaskie and Warmian-Masurian Voivodeships	3	3	52	2,651	884	44,360	14,787
Warsaw	Poland	City of Warsaw and part of the Masovian Voivodeship (Note: Powiats: Grodzisk, Legionowo, Nowy Dwór, Otwock, Piaseczno, Pruszków, Warsaw West and Wołomin)	6	6	52	2,795	466	11,205	1,868
Masovian	Poland	The rest of the Masovian Voivodeship (Note: Powiats: Ciechanów, Gostynin, Mława, Płock, Płońsk, Przasnysz, Sierpc, Sochaczew, Żuromin, Żyrardów, Białobrzegi, Grójec, Kozienice, Lipsko, Przysucha, Radom, Szydłowiec, Zwoleń, Garwolin, Łosice, Maków, Mińsk, Ostrołęka, Ostrów, Pułtusk, Siedlce, Sokołów, Węgrów, Wyszków and the cities of Płock, Radom, Ostrołęka and Siedlce)	3	3	52	2,499	833	24,353	8,118
Łódź	Poland	Łódź Voivodeship	3	3	52	2,529	843	18,219	6,073
Greater Poland	Poland	Greater Poland Voivodeship	5	5	52	3,350	670	15,183	3,037
Lublin	Poland	Lublin Voivodeship	3	3	52	2,169	732	25,122	8,374
Subcarpathian	Poland	Subcarpathian Voivodeship	3	3	52	2,129	710	17,846	5,949
Lesser Poland and Świętokrzyskie	Poland	Lesser Poland and Świętokrzyskie Voivodeships	5	6	52	4,735	789	41,537	6,923
Silesian	Poland	Silesian Voivodeship	7	7	52	4,621	660	12,333	1,762
Lower Silesian and Opole	Poland	Lower Silesian and Opole Voivodeships	4	4	52	3,928	982	29,359	7,340
Lubusz and West Pomeranian	Poland	Lubusz and West Pomeranian Voivodeships	4	4	52	2,745	686	36,880	9,220
Portugal	Portugal	(Full country)	21	21	21	10,515	501	92,212	4,391
Romania	Romania	(Full country)	32	33	33	21,385	648	238,391	7,224
Slovakia	Slovakia	(Full country)	13	14	14	5,408	386	49,036	3,503
Slovenia	Slovenia	(Full country)	8	8	8	2,057	257	20,273	2,534
Spain	Spain	(Full country)	54	59	59	46,773	793	505,991	8,576
Sweden	Sweden	(Full country)	20	21	21	9,519	453	438,576	20,885
Total			751	705	705	445,056	631	4,238,831	6,013

== Former constituencies ==
Constituencies for the 2009 election

Constituencies for the 2014 election

Constituencies for the 2019 election

=== Denmark ===
Denmark had a separate constituency for Greenland until 1985, when the autonomous territory withdrew from the EEC (later expanded to become the EU).

=== France ===
Constituencies of France 2004-2019

Between 2004 and 2019, France was divided into 8 constituencies:

- East
- Île-de-France
- Massif-central–Centre
- North-West
- Overseas Territories
- South-East
- South-West
- West

=== Ireland ===
Ireland's constituencies have changed several times:

- 1979 to 2004: Connacht–Ulster, Dublin, Leinster, Munster
- 2004 to 2014: Dublin, East, North-West, South
- 2014 to present: Dublin, Midlands–North-West, South

=== United Kingdom ===
Constituencies of the United Kingdom 1999-2020

Before the United Kingdom's withdrawal from the EU, there was a 3-member single transferable vote constituency covering Northern Ireland. The constituencies covering England, Scotland, and Wales changed several times:

- Between 1979 and 1994, there were 78 first-past-the-post single-member constituencies.
- Between 1994 and 1999, there were 84 first-past-the-post single-member constituencies.
- Between 1999 and 2020, there were 11 d'Hondt multi-member constituencies, one for each of Scotland, Wales, and the nine regions of England. From 2004, the South West England constituency also covered Gibraltar.

== Proposed pan-European constituency ==
On 3 May 2022 the European Parliament passed (323 votes to 262) a "legislative resolution on the reform of European electoral law". Among the proposals is the creation of a 28-member pan-Union constituency elected by party-list proportional representation on a list separate from elections for regional constituencies. However, in July 2023 the reference to it was removed by the European Council.

== See also ==
- Member of the European Parliament
- Constituency
- Apportionment in the European Parliament
