= Henryk Kierzkowski =

Polish economist (born 1943)

- Born: 10 October 1943 (age 82)
- Education: Queen's University
- Known for: Imperfect competition and international trade
- Scientific career
- Fields: International trade, macroeconomics, economic development, economics of transition
- Workplaces: Graduate Institute of International and Development Studies

Henryk Kierzkowski (born 10 October 1943) is a Polish economist known for his work on imperfect competition and international trade.

Kierzkowski was a senior economist at the Bank of Canada, Deputy Chief-Economist of the European Bank for Reconstruction and Development in London, economic advisor to the governments of Poland and Albania, and taught international economics at the Geneva Graduate Institute. He was a member of the Nobel Prize in Economics Committee, which puts forward candidates for the Nobel Prize in Economics. His book Monopolistic Competition and International Trade "helped to launch the New Trade Theory". With Ronald W. Jones, he collaborated "to develop the theory of fragmentation of production".

== Writings ==
- With Ronald Findlay. International Trade and Human Capital: A Simple General Equilibrium Model. In: Journal of Political Economy, vol. 91, no. 6, 1983, p. 957-978.
- Monopolistic Competition and International Trade. Oxford: Oxford University Press, 1989. ISBN 978-0-19-828726-1 Synopsis
