= Bogusław Liberadzki =

Polish economist and politician

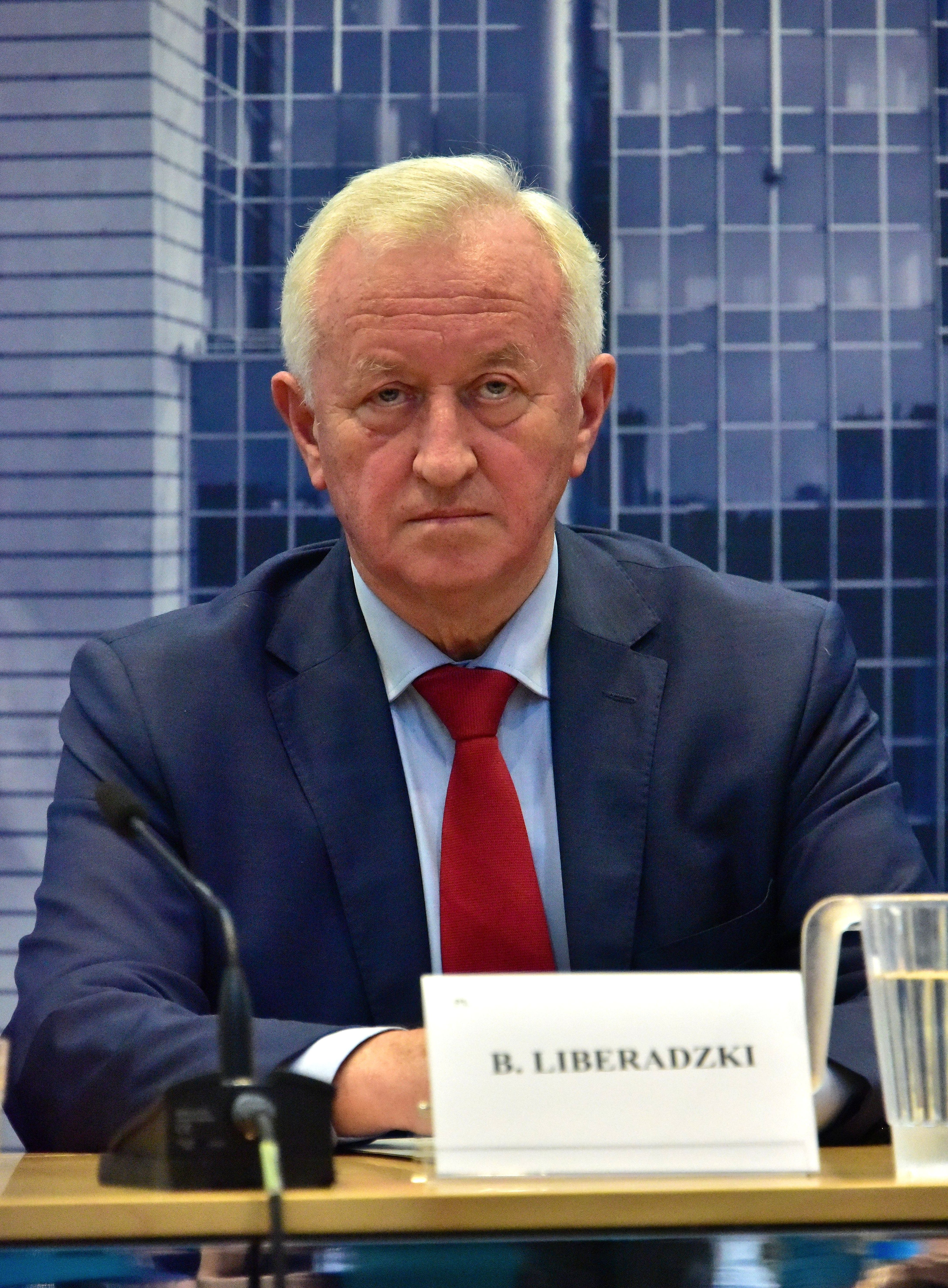
Bogusław Liberadzki

Bogusław Marian Liberadzki (pronounced [bɔˈɡuswaf libɛˈrat͡ski]; born 12 September 1948 in Sochaczew) is a Polish economist and politician. He has been a Member of the European Parliament (MEP) since 2004.

== Biography ==
Bogusław Liberadzki is a professor of economics. He was educated at Main School of Planning and Statistics (now Warsaw School of Economics) and the University of Illinois. He holds the Chair of Transportation at the Warsaw School of Economics in Warsaw (Szkoła Główna Handlowa w Warszawie - SGH) and is also a professor in the Maritime University of Szczecin (Akademia Morska w Szczecinie).

He was an under secretary (vice minister) in the Ministry of Transportation and Maritime Economy 1989–1993 and minister in that ministry 1993–1997. Between 1997 and 2003 he was an MP (member of Sejm, lower house of Polish parliament) representing Democratic Left Alliance. Since 2003 he has sat in the European Parliament, first as a permanent observer and then on 1 May 2003 he was appointed an MEP. He is currently vice president of the European Parliament and a member of two committees: Budgetary Control and Transport and Tourism.

== Personal life ==
He has a wife, Grażyna and two sons (identical twins) - Kamil (MA) and Marcin (PhD), both working at the Department of Banking of the SGH.
