= Hanna Foltyn-Kubicka =

Polish politician (born 1950)

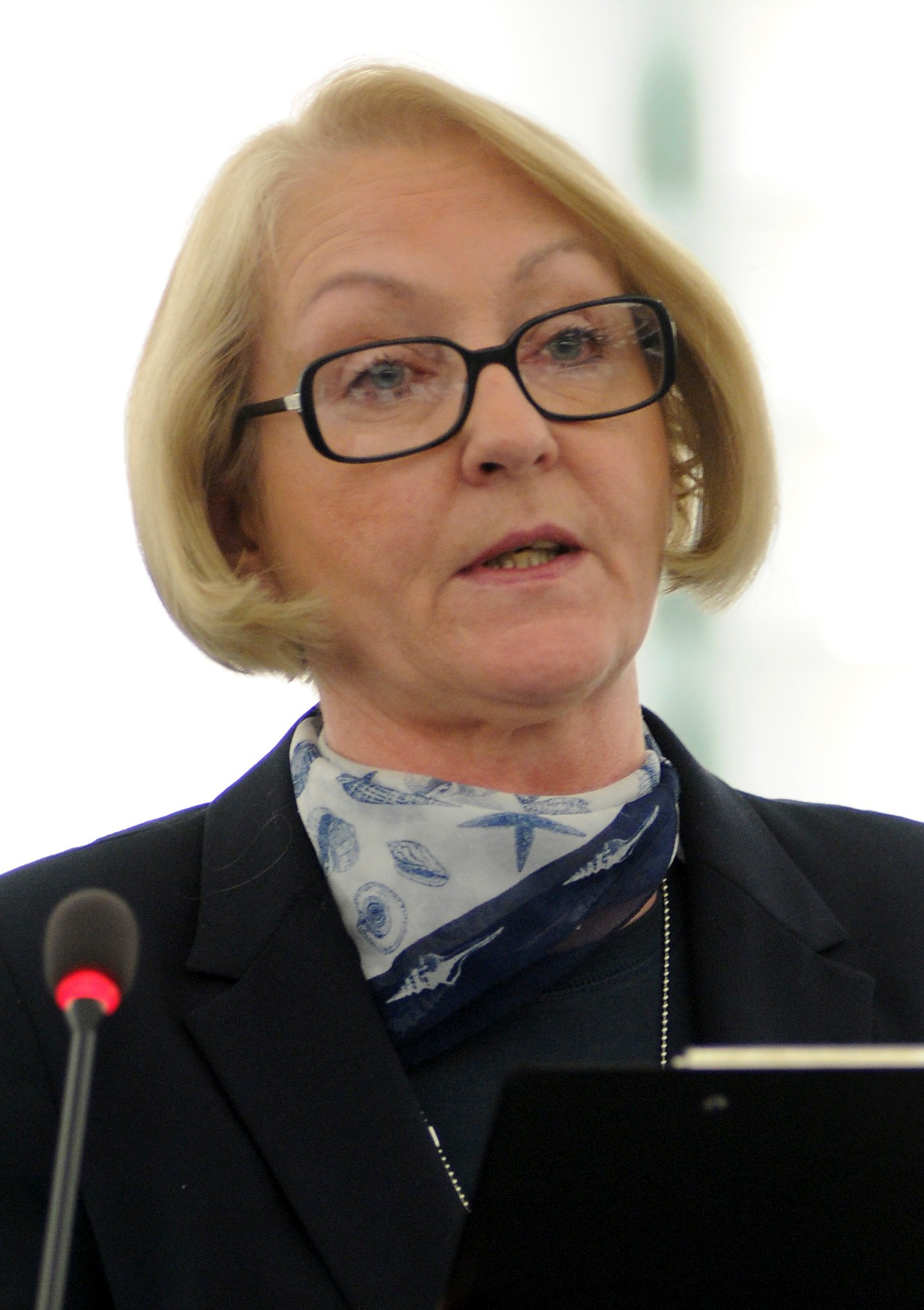
Foltyn-Kubicka in 2009

Hanna Foltyn-Kubicka (23 May 1950 in Jelenia Góra, Poland), is a Polish politician and a Member of the European Parliament (MEP). She is a member of the Law and Justice Party, which is part of the Union for Europe of the Nations Group in the European Parliament. She was a member on the Committee on Regional Development and the delegation to the EU-Russia Parliamentary Cooperation Committee. She is a substitute for the Committee on Culture and Education and the delegation to the EU-Bulgaria Joint Parliamentary Committee.

Foltyn-Kubicka graduated with a master's degree in German Philology in 1973 and worked as an assistant at the Institute of German Philology at the University of Silesia until 1974. From 1974 to 1992 she worked as a German language lecturer at the Academy of Physical Education and Sport in Gdańsk, and then became an interpreter at a Sopot shipping company until 2004.

She was made head of the private office of Lech Kaczyński, then a member of the Polish Parliament and currently the President of the Republic of Poland, from 2001 to 2002. She then managed the private office of Anna Fotyga, a Member of the European Parliament, in 2004 and 2005. She is a member of both the Law and Justice Party National Bureau and Political Council and the Pomerania Voivodship Bureau. In 1980 she was a member of Solidarność, an independent self-governing trade union.

Foltyn-Kubicka previously held office as a Regional Councillor for the Voivodship of Pomerania from 2002 to 2005. She was a member of the Polish Parliament from 19 October 2005 to 9 December 2005.
