= Democratic Left Alliance – Labour Union =

Coalition of political parties in Poland

Democratic Left Alliance – Labour Union Sojusz Lewicy Demokratycznej-Unia Pracy (Polish)
- Founded: 17 October 2000
- Dissolved: 19 July 2019
- Ideology: Social democracy Pro-Europeanism
- Political position: Centre-left
- Members: Democratic Left Alliance; Labour Union; Social Democracy of Poland; People's Democratic Party
- Colors: Red
- Slogan: Return to normalcy - win the future. Przywróćmy normalność - wygrajmy przyszłość. (Polish)

Democratic Left Alliance – Labour Union (Polish: Sojusz Lewicy Demokratycznej-Unia Pracy, SLD-UP) was an electoral committee and a coalition of two Polish centre-left political parties: Democratic Left Alliance and Labour Union. At the national level, the alliance arose at the time of the 2001 parliamentary elections and continued through the 2004 elections to the European Parliament. The alliance came together again for the 2009 and 2014 European parliamentary elections.

The SLD-UP won a stunning victory at the 2001 parliamentary elections, gaining 41% of the vote, and formed the government with the Polish People's Party. During the 2001–2005 term, there occurred a splintering of the alliance and there came into being four left-wing political caucuses in the Polish parliament:

- Democratic Left Alliance (SLD)
- Labour Union (UP)
- Social Democracy of Poland (SDPL)
- People's Democratic Party (PLD)

The SLD-UP maintained their alliance for the European parliamentary elections of 2004, and won five seats with 9.3% of the vote, a sharp decline from the national elections in 2001.

In the 2005 parliamentary elections, SDPL, Labour Union and Greens 2004 formed a joint electoral committee, under the leadership of the SDPL, and most of the PLD members joined Self-Defense of the Republic of Poland.

Following the relatively poor performance of the SDPL-UP-Greens at the 2005 parliamentary elections (they polled 3.9% and failed to break the 5% parliamentary threshold), and the overwhelming success of right-wing parties, the SDPL and UP sought to reapproach the SLD, and seek a new understanding. A new alliance was born in 2006-07, the Left and Democrats, which consisted of the three left-wing parties, SLD, SDPL and UP as well as the centrist Democratic Party (PD). Left and Democrats contested the 2007 parliamentary elections and polled 13.2% of the vote. SLD, SDPL and PD saw several of their representatives elected to the Sejm, but the UP failed to elect any members. In 2008, following a rift between the constituent parties of the Left and Democrats, the alliance came to an end with PD and SDPL leaving the alliance in April. These two went on to form the Agreement for the Future, together with the Greens 2004, for the 2009 European elections. The Labour Union, however, chose to maintain its alliance with SLD, and at the elections SLD-UP polled 12.3%, electing seven representatives to the European Parliament.

The SLD-UP coalition was reactivated for the 2014 European Parliament elections. It received 9.4% of the votes and won five seats.

SLD and UP also participated together in a broader left-wing coalition SLD Left Together that contested the 2014 and 2018 local elections.
