= Marek Borowski =

Polish politician (born 1946)

Marek Stefan Borowski
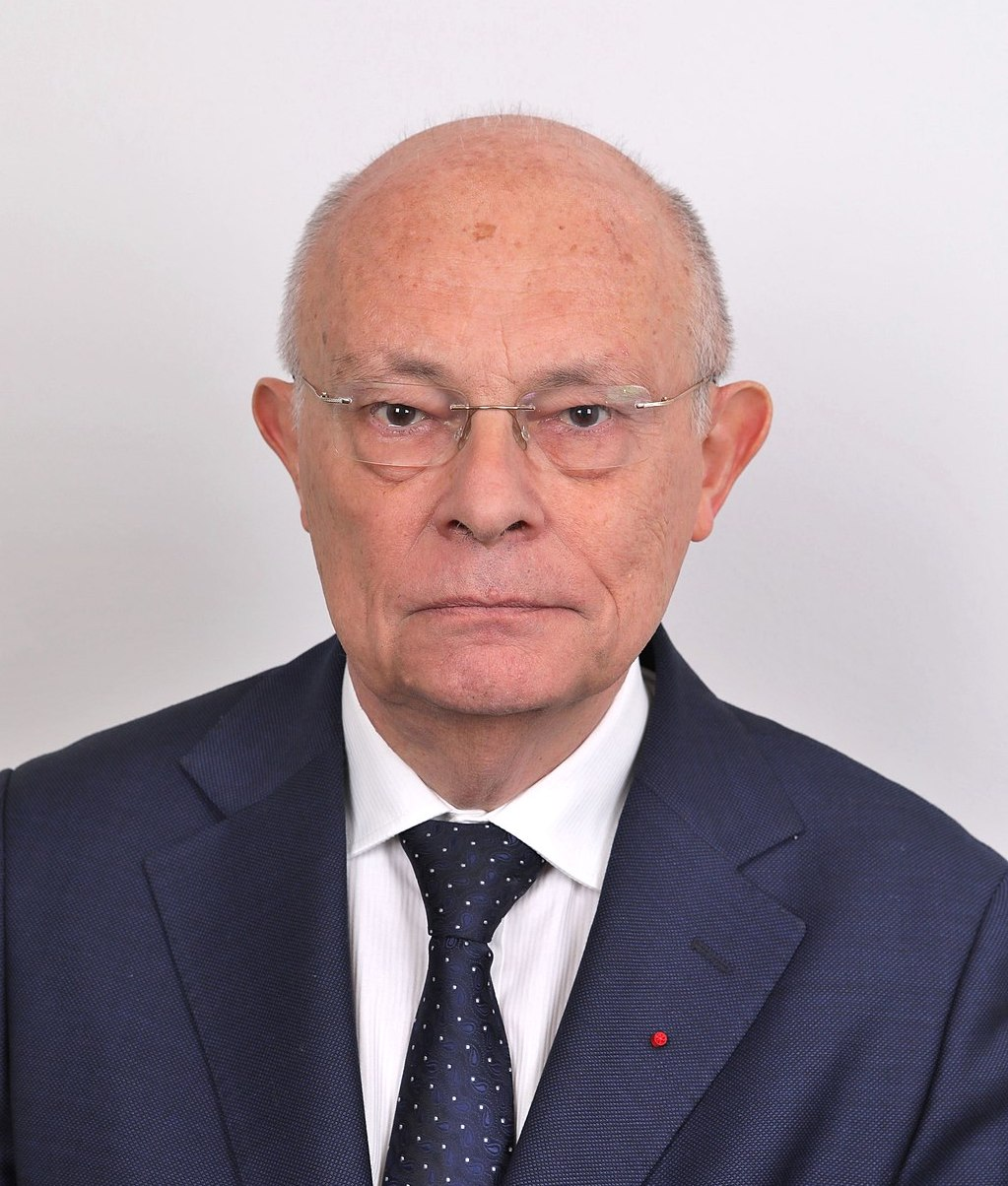

Marshal of the Sejm
- In office 19 October 2001 – 20 April 2004
- Preceded by: Maciej Płażyński
- Succeeded by: Józef Oleksy

Deputy Prime Minister of Poland
- In office 26 October 1993 – 8 February 1994
- President: Lech Wałęsa
- Prime Minister: Waldemar Pawlak
- Preceded by: Henryk Goryszewski; Paweł Łączkowski
- Succeeded by: Roman Jagieliński; Grzegorz Kołodko; Aleksander Łuczak

Minister of Finance
- In office 26 October 1993 – 8 February 1994
- President: Lech Wałęsa
- Prime Minister: Waldemar Pawlak
- Preceded by: Jerzy Osiatyński
- Succeeded by: Grzegorz Kołodko

Member of Sejm
- In office 25 November 1991 – 18 October 2005
- In office 5 November 2007 – 7 November 2011

Member of Senate
- Incumbent
- Assumed office 8 November 2011

Personal details
- Born: 4 January 1946 (age 80) Warsaw, Poland
- Party: Polish United Workers' Party (1967-1990); Democratic Left Alliance (1990-2004); Social Democratic Party of Poland (2004-2015); Independent (2015-2019); Civic Coalition (since 2019)
- Spouse: Halina Borowska
- Profession: Economist

Marek Stefan Borowski (Polish pronunciation: [ˈmarɛk bɔˈrɔfskʲi]; born 4 January 1946 in Warsaw, Poland) is a Polish politician, who has served as a member of the Senate since 2011. He led the Democratic Left Alliance (SLD) for a time and was Speaker of the Sejm (the lower, more powerful, house of Poland's parliament) from 2001 to 2004.

== Biography ==
He was born to a Polish-Jewish family, as a son of Janina and Wiktor Borowski(born as Aron Berman).

He was Minister of Finance of Poland from 1993 to 1994. From 2004 to January 2009 he was the leader and chairman, of a new Polish left-wing party called Social Democracy of Poland (SdPl), formed from a break-away group of SLD.

Marek Borowski is an MP from Piła, but in the September 2005 parliamentary elections he contested a seat in Warsaw. Borowski was the Social Democratic presidential candidate in the 2005 Polish presidential elections. Just as his party received a massive defeat in the September 2005 Parliamentary elections, Borowski lost the presidential elections, receiving 10% of the vote and fourth place, despite Aleksander Kwaśniewski's support following the withdrawal of Włodzimierz Cimoszewicz.

His presidential slogan was "I keep my promises. That's the difference." He promised to modernize Warsaw and make it city of European level, lower the unemployment rate and tackle corruption. He stood against lustration, extending presidential powers and current abortion laws. Borowski proposed his opponent to release the files of Institute of National Remembrance about them and show their electoral programme.

He most recently ran (unsuccessfully) for the office of mayor of Warsaw in the 2010 local elections.

== See also ==
- 2005 Polish presidential election
- List of Polish United Workers' Party members
