= Agreement for the Future – CenterLeft =

Agreement for the Future – CenterLeft Porozumienie dla Przyszłości – CentroLewica
- Abbreviation: PdP – CentroLewica
- Leader: Dariusz Rosati
- Founded: February 1, 2009
- Dissolved: June 7, 2009
- Headquarters: ul. Mokotowska 29a 00-560 Warsaw
- Ideology: Social liberalism Social democracy Green politics

Agreement for the Future – CenterLeft (Polish Porozumienie dla Przyszłości – CentroLewica) was a short-lived center-left electoral alliance of Social Democracy of Poland, Democratic Party and Greens 2004 founded by Dariusz Rosati on 1 February 2009 and dissolved 7 June 2009.
