= Social Democracy of Poland =

Social Democracy of Poland Socjaldemokracja Polska
- Abbreviation: SDPL
- Leader: Wojciech Filemonowicz
- Founded: 26 March 2004; 22 years ago
- Split from: Democratic Left Alliance
- Headquarters: ul. Mokotowska 29 A, 00–560 Warsaw
- Ideology: Social democracy
- Political position: Centre-left
- National affiliation: SDPL–UP–Greens 2004 (2004); Left and Democrats (2006–2008); European Coalition (2019); Civic Coalition (2019); The Left (2023–)
- European Parliament group: Party of European Socialists (2004–2009)
- Colours: Red; Orange
- Sejm: 0 / 460
- Senate: 0 / 100
- European Parliament: 0 / 51
- Regional assemblies: 0 / 555

Website
- www.sdpl.pl

The Social Democracy of Poland (Polish: Socjaldemokracja Polska, SDPL) is a social-democratic political party in Poland.

== Foundation ==
The party was founded in April 2004 as a splinter group from the post-communist Democratic Left Alliance (SLD), initially led by Marek Borowski, with Jolanta Banach serving as chair of the parliamentary caucus. The SDPL should not be confused with a former party the Social Democracy of the Republic of Poland (SdRP) which existed between 1990–99 and was a direct predecessor of the SLD.

== First elections ==
SDPL contested its first elections in June 2004, this being for Polish representation to the European parliament. The party gained 5.3%, which saw three members elected to parliament. In May 2005 the party reached an agreement with Labour Union (UP) and Greens 2004 to jointly contest for the forthcoming Polish parliamentary elections, under the SDPL banner. SDPL managed to gain 3.9% of the vote, but fell short of the 5% threshold required to win parliamentary representation. SDPL put forward its party leader Marek Borowski, as candidate for the Polish presidential elections held in the following month of October. Borowski came fourth in the first round, winning 10.3% of the vote.

== Coalition within LiD ==
On 3 September 2006, SDPL joined the newly formed Left and Democrats (LiD) coalition, made up of the centre-left parties SDPL, SLD, UP and the centrist Democratic Party – demokraci.pl. This alliance was created with a view to jointly contest the upcoming local government elections. The LiD alliance was maintained for the Polish parliamentary elections of October 2007, and LiD achieved 13.2% of the vote. This translated into 53 lower house seats, 10 of which were won by SDPL.

After LiD dissolved, 8 out of 10 SDPL MPs formed a new parliamentary caucus called Social Democracy of Poland – New Left (Socjaldemoracja Polska – Nowa Lewica, SDPL-NL).

On 3 February 2013, SDPL leader Wojciech Filemonowicz and Palikot's Movement leader Janusz Palikot stated an ambition to form an electoral alliance between the two parties to contest the European elections in 2014. The alliance was named Europa Plus. The SDPL withdrew from the alliance, along with the Union of the Left, on 7 February 2014.

== Election results ==
=== Sejm ===
Election	# of votes	% of vote	# of overall seats won	+/–	Government
2005	459,380	3.9 (#7)	0 / 460	▼32	Extra-parliamentary
2005	In an electoral alliance with Labour United and Greens 2004.				
2007	2,122,981	13.2 (#3)	10 / 460	▲10	Opposition
2007	As part of the Left and Democrats coalition, which won 53 seats in total.				
2011	5,629,773	39.2 (#1)	0 / 460	▼10	Extra-parliamentary
2011	In coalition with Civic Platform.				
2015	1,147,102	7.6 (#5)	0 / 460	0	Extra-parliamentary
2015	As part of United Left, which won no seat.				
2019	5,060,355	27.4 (#2)	0 / 460	0	Extra-parliamentary
2019	As part of Civic Coalition, which won 134 seats in total.				
2023	1,859,018	8.6 (#4)	0 / 460	0	Extra-parliamentary
2023	As part of The Left, which won 26 seats in total.				

=== Senate ===
Election	# of overall seats won	+/–
2005	0 / 100	▼10
2007	0 / 100	Steady
2011	2 / 100	▲1
2015	1 / 100	Steady

=== Presidential ===
Election	Candidate	1st round		2nd round	
Election	Candidate	# of overall votes	% of overall vote	# of overall votes	% of overall vote
2005	Marek Borowski	1,544,642	10.3 (#4)		

=== European Parliament ===
Election	# of votes	% of vote	# of overall seats won	+/–
2004	324,707	5.3 (#8)	3 / 54	▲3
2009	179,602	2.4 (#5)	0 / 50	▼3
2009	As part of the Agreement for the Future – CenterLeft coalition.			

== Elected representatives ==
=== Members of the Sejm ===
Prior to the October, 2011, Polish parliamentary election, where the party's representation was wiped out, SDPL had three members of the Sejm:

- Marek Borowski (19 – Warsaw I)
- Grażyna Ciemniak (4 – Bydgoszcz)
- Izabella Sierakowska (6 – Lublin)

Marek Borowski, was elected to the Polish Senate in the 2011 elections as an independent candidate. He retained his membership of SDPL.
