= Sylwia Spurek =

Polish politician (born 1976)

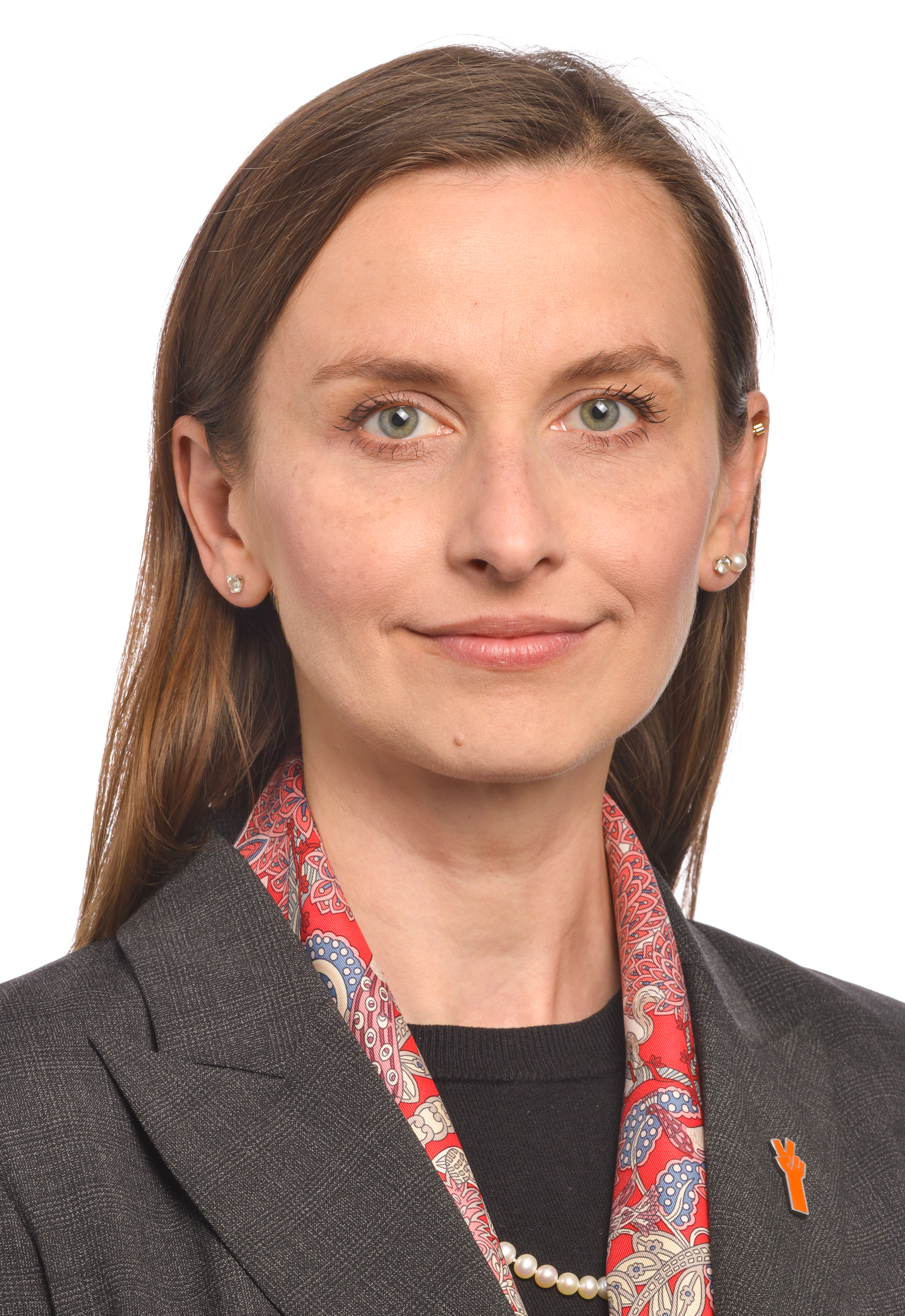
- Spurek in 2019

Member of the European Parliament for Poland
- In office 2 July 2019 – 15 July 2024
- Parliamentary group: Non-inscrit (2024); Greens/EFA (2020–2024); S&D (2019–2020)
- Constituency: Greater Poland

Personal details
- Born: 29 January 1976 (age 50) Skarżysko-Kamienna, Poland
- Party: Independent (2019–present); Spring (2019)
- Spouse: Marcin Anaszewicz (m. 2020, partner since 2001)
- Education: University of Łódź
- Occupation: Lecturer; politician
- Profession: Lawyer
- Website: sylwiaspurek.pl

Sylwia Iwona Spurek (born 29 January 1976) is a Polish lawyer, as well as a social and political activist. A doctor of law, lecturer, solicitor, and legislator, she specialises in criminal law. Spurek is a member of the Polish Society of Anti-Discrimination Law and the Polish Legislative Society. From 2019 to 2024 she served as a Member of the European Parliament.

From 2015 to 2019, she was Deputy Polish Ombudsman (serving Polish Ombudsman at the time was Adam Bodnar). She was a Spring (part of the Progressive Alliance of Socialists and Democrats group) Member of the European Parliament (MEP) elected in the 2019 European parliamentary election. She left Spring on 28 October 2019, and subsequently joined the Greens-EFA group in the European Parliament. She left the Group in June 2024 and became an Independent MEP.

From September 2024 at the Woodrow Wilson International Center for Scholars in Washington, DC.

== Early life and education ==
Spurek was born on 29 January 1976 in Skarżysko-Kamienna, Poland. She attended the Adam Mickiewicz High School in Skarżysko-Kamienna from 1991 to 1995, where she passed her matriculation exam. She graduated from University of Łódź Faculty of Law and Administration in 2000. Her master thesis focused on the participation of women's organisations in civil procedure. In the same year, she was awarded a scholarship from the Legal Fellowship Program and attended the International Women's Human Rights Clinic at the City University of New York. While in New York, she became involved in Hillary Clinton's 2000 election campaign. In 2004, Spurek completed a legislation training at the Polish Governmental Legislation Centre.

Spurek has a Domestic Violence Councellor Certificate awarded by The Blue Line Polish Nationwide Emergency Service for Victims of Domestic Violence – at the Institute of Health Psychology at the Polish Psychological Association.

In 2012, she defended a doctoral thesis on legal aspects of preventing domestic violence, with a focus on isolating perpetrators from victims.

== Career ==
She has been a lecturer at Gender Studies at the University of Warsaw and at the Gender Mainstreaming postgraduate studies at the Polish Academy of Sciences. She has authored publications on domestic violence, equal treatment, and discrimination.

From 2002 to 2005, she worked in the Secretariat of the Government Plenipotentiary for Equal Status of Women and Men, when this function was held by Izabela Jaruga-Nowacka. Spurek dealt with i.a. the government bill on counteracting domestic violence. In 2005, she began working with Magdalena Środa as her spokesperson. In the years 2008–2015, she was a member of the Team for the European Court of Human Rights at the Ministry of Foreign Affairs. In the years 2010–2012, Spurek was a representative of the Head of the Chancellery of the Prime Minister in the Committee for the Protection of Rights. Until 2014, she was an advisor to the Polish Prime Minister in the Legal Department of the Chancellery of the Prime Minister. Until June 2015, she was the deputy head of the Office of the Government Plenipotentiary for Equal Treatment and was responsible, among other things, for coordinating government work on the ratification of the Council of Europe Convention on preventing and combating violence against women and domestic violence. On 22 September 2015, she became the Deputy Commissioner for Human Rights for Equal Treatment with the Polish Ombudsman. She resigned from this position on 28 February 2019, due to plans for political involvement.

Spurek is on the Expert Board of the European Vegan Summit.

In 2022, as part of her parliamentary program "Wolni od Ferm" (Free from Farms), she published a free expert study "Smród, krew i łzy. Włącz myślenie, bądź zmianą" (Stench, blood and tears. Turn on your thinking, be the change), which focuses on the impact of factory farms and the livestock sector in Poland on the environment, human rights and animal rights.

Since September 2024, she is a fellow with Woodrow Wilson International Center for Scholars think tank, researching in online violence against women.

== Social activism ==
She is co-founder of the first vegan think-tank in Poland, Green REV Institute. Since 2021, she has been publishing a podcast Prawo Spurek (Spurek's Law), in which she raises the problem of violating the rights of women, animals and minorities.

In March 2019, together with her partner Marcin Anaszewicz, Spurek published the book Związek partnerski, rozmowy o Polsce (Domestic Partnerships, Talks about Poland, 2019), and all the profit from the sale of the book is transferred to the foundation International Movement for Animals Viva!.

=== Women's rights ===
Expert of the European Institute for Gender Equality (EU), Gender Equality Unit (CoE) and the United Nations Population Fund (UNDP). From 2017 to 2019, she was a member of the board of directors of Equinet. Until 2019, she was an honorary member of the Program Council of the Femfund Feminist Fund, which raises funds and awards grants to feminist organizations.

Since 2019, he has been participating in the celebration of the 16 Days of Activism against Gender-based Violence. In 2021, on this occasion, she published the free publication "Nasza Konwencja" (Our Convention), which is the first full edition of the Istanbul Convention in Polish. In 2022, she dedicated her social campaign to cyberbullying against women. In the video spot, she posted real comments and threats that she had received under her posts on social media. On the occasion of the 16 Days, she twice sent a letter to Ursula von der Leyen, drawing attention to the problem of violence against women and indicating preventive and assistance legal and non-legal measures that should be considered by the European Commission.

Spurek supported the Black Protest in Poland in 2020.

She described cyberviolence against women as "a new face of an old problem". Spurek emphasizes that men also experience this form of violence, but she wants to draw attention to the scale and nature of violence experienced by women – she says that it is different, pointing out that women are attacked for their appearance, private, family and intimate life, they are also threatened with sexual violence, which men do not usually experience.

=== The issue of violence ===
Spurek appeals to fight violence by changing the protection system. One of the reforms she has proposed is to transfer the responsibility for forensic examination from the victim to law enforcement agencies. She has pointed out that there is a need to raise public awareness and educate services that intervene in cases of violence, especially domestic violence. She calls for systematizing the help that victims can count on – legal, psychological and administrative assistance. As Deputy Commissioner for Human Rights, Spurek drew attention to the problem of violence experienced by children and the problem of corporal punishment. She has also raised this subject after leaving this position and later, as a politician.

In 2019, in her campaign as part of the 16 Days of Activism against Gender-based Violence, she admitted that she had been a victim of violence as a child.

She called for the criminalisation of any form of cyberviolence in all Member States.

=== Minority and LGBTQIA+ rights ===
She regularly participates in equality marches in Poland. She actively works for the rights of minorities, including LGBTQIA+ people. She demands a recognition of their rights, including marriage equality, the right to adoption, modern regulations on gender recognition or gender reassignment, good anti-discrimination education and protection against hate speech. During the equality march in Szczecin in 2022, Spurek stated that "a decent person, every politician should stand here – where respect and acceptance are". She also added that every person at the head of an opposition party with ambitions to repair Poland "after the Law and Justice party" (PIS) has a duty to stand shoulder to shoulder with people whose rights are violated – gays, lesbians and transgender people.

=== Animal rights ===
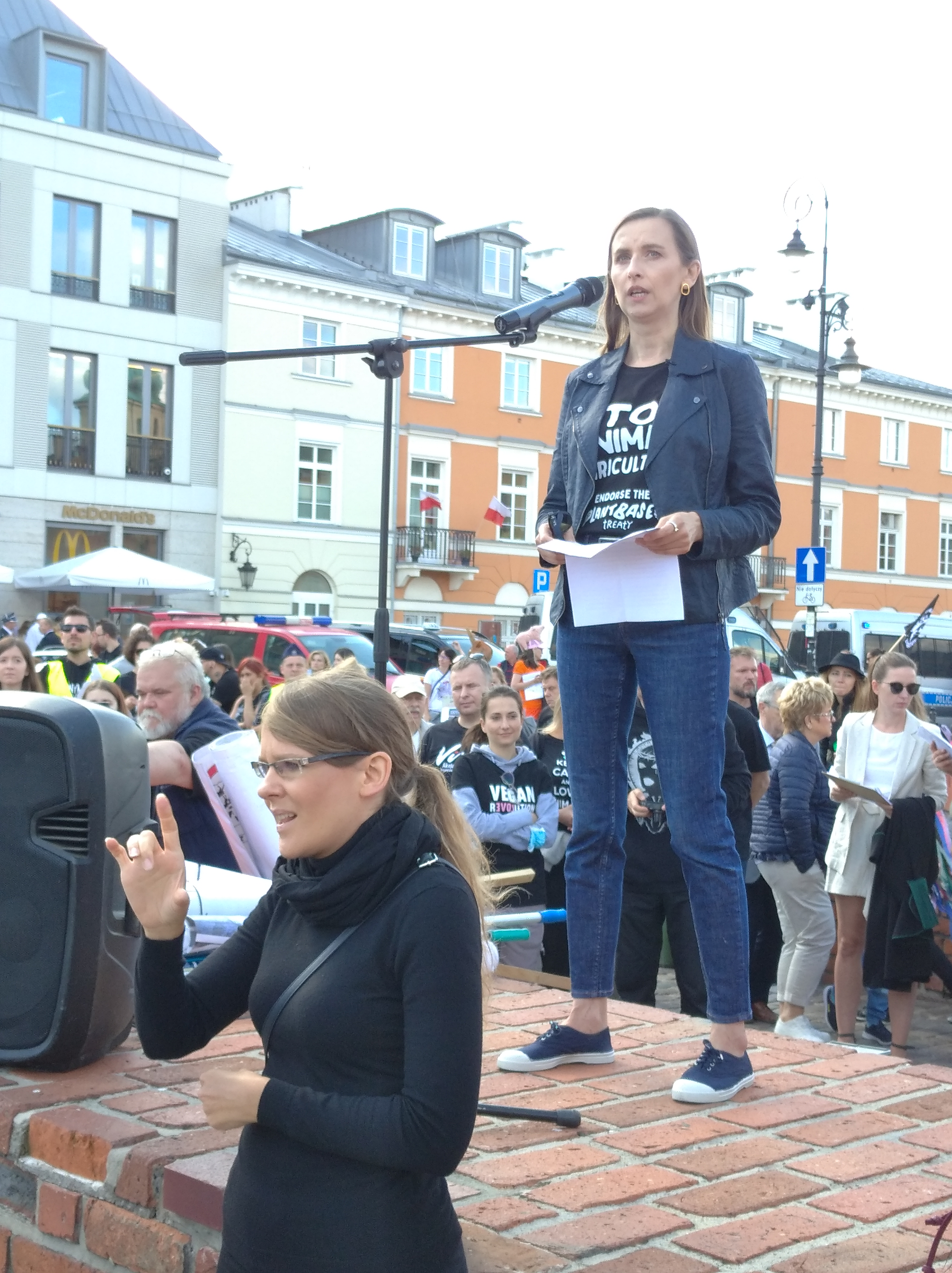
Sylwia Spurek during her speech at the conclusion of the Animal Liberation March in Warsaw (2021).

Sylwia Spurek declares herself a vegan and an animal rights activist. She promotes a language that emphasizes the autonomy and subjectivity of animals.

=== Climate education ===
In March 2024, together with multiple experts, Spurek appealed to the Minister of National Education Barbara Nowacka to introduce elements of environmental science, animal rights and sustainable development into school curricula and textbooks. Arguing for the need for such solutions, Spurek wrote: "Climate, environmental and animal rights education should be an integral part of curricula so that young people can understand the relationship between human actions and climate change and see how their own decisions and behaviors affect the environment. Schools should promote sustainable practices, teach about the greenhouse effect, renewable energy sources, biodiversity protection, a sustainable food system and animal rights, including the so-called farm animals."

=== Commemoration of the Victims of the So-Called Montreal Massacre ===
In April 2024, on the occasion of the 35th anniversary, she initiated a commemoration for the victims of the so-called Montreal Massacre, including the only Polish victim, Barbara Klucznik-Widajewicz from Wrocław, who, along with eleven other women, was killed by the attacker Marc Lépine in 1989. The attacker was motivated by hatred of women. Spurek's open letter to the Mayor of Wrocław, Jacek Sutryk, and the Rector of the University of Economics in Wrocław, Prof. Andrzej Kaleta, was supported by, among others, the Canadian Ambassador to Poland, Catherine Godin, founder of the "Różowa Skrzyneczka" Foundation, Adrianna Klimaszewska, Prof. Maria Wanda Kopertyńska, Joanna Kuciel-Frydryszak, Dr. Aleksandra Przegalińska, and Olga Tokarczuk.

== Political career ==
At the beginning of March 2019, Spurek became involved in the political project of Robert Biedroń – the Spring party. Spurek was elected in the 2019 European parliamentary election from Greater Poland – Poznan constituency as a member of the European Parliament, obtaining 55,306 (4.61%) votes – which was the second result in the country. She joined the Progressive Alliance of Socialists and Democrats (S&D). She became a member of the European Parliament Committee on Civil Liberties, Justice and Home Affairs (LIBE) (until 2020, then a substitute) and the substitute member in the European Parliament Committee on the Environment, Public Health and Food Safety(until 2020).

She left Spring on 28 October 2019. As a reason, she indicated the changes done to the party's statutes. Subsequently, she announced that she would from then on sit in the Greens-EFA Group in the European Parliament.

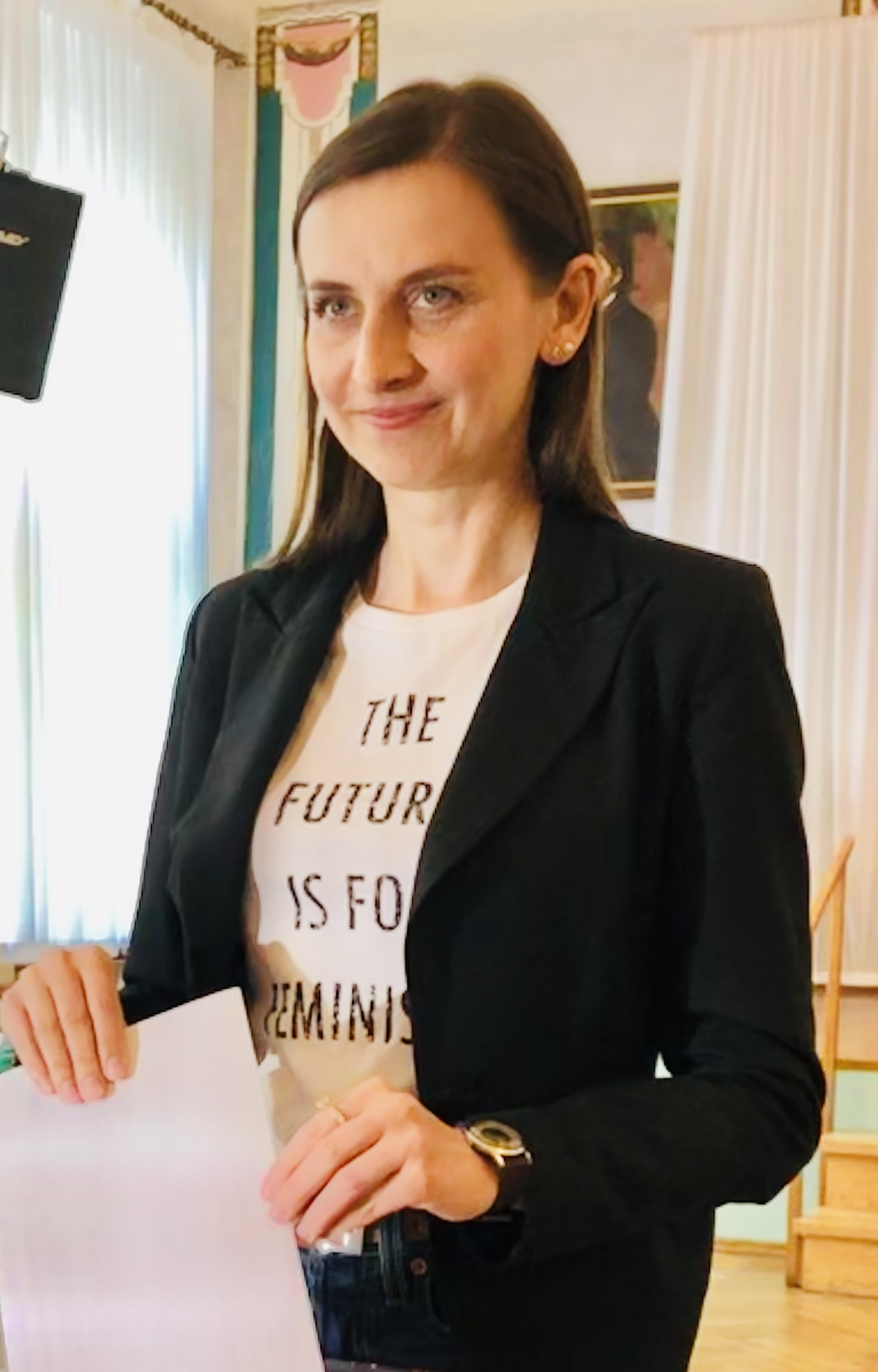
Sylwia Spurek in 2019 r. wearing a feminist T-shirt.

In 2020, she became a vice-chair of the European Parliament Committee on Women's Rights and Gender Equality (FEMM). Throughout her mandate, she was a member of: the Delegation to the EU-Moldova Parliamentary Association Committee (09.07.2020 – 29.09.2020), the Delegation for relations with the countries of South Asia (09.07.2020 – 29.09.2020), the Delegation to the Euronest Parliamentary Assembly (09.07.2020 – 29.09.2020), and the Delegation to the EU-Russia Parliamentary Cooperation Committee (05.10.2020 – 01.05.2022); and a substitute member of: the Delegation for relations with Canada (02.07.2019 – 29.09.2020), the Committee on Agriculture and Rural Development (10.02.2020 – 29.09.2020), the Committee of Inquiry on the Protection of Animals during Transport (19.06.2020 – 29.09.2020), Delegation for relations with the People's Republic of China (01.10.2020 – 01.05.2022), the Delegation to the Euronest Parliamentary Assembly (01.10.2020 – 01.05.2022), and the Committee of Inquiry to investigate the use of Pegasus and equivalent surveillance spyware (24.03.2022 – 18.07.2023).

In addition to her committee assignments, Spurek is a member of the European Parliament Intergroup on Climate Change, Biodiversity and Sustainable Development; the European Parliament Intergroup on Disability; the European Parliament Intergroup on LGBT Rights; and the European Parliament Intergroup on the Welfare and Conservation of Animals.

As part of the FEMM and LIBE committees, she actively worked for the ratification of the Istanbul Convention by the European Union. She was a shadow reporter of the report on this convention. As a shadow reporter, she also participated in the work on reports on, among others, the rights of people with disabilities, democracy or cases of harassment in EU institutions.

In 2019, she joined the group of MEPs monitoring the issue of respect for democracy in the Member States. In 2020, together with Terry Reintke, she sent a letter to the Polish authorities, calling for dialogue and listening to the demands of protesters against the restriction of the right to abortion. The letter was signed by over 100 Members of the European Parliament and Members of the National Council of Austria.

In December 2021, the European Parliament adopted a resolution on combating cyberbullying. Spurek was its rapporteur.

In 2021, during a vote in the European Parliament on access to abortion and abortion rights in Poland, Spurek proposed the establishment of an investigative committee on abortion in Poland, which would be tasked with investigating the issue of negligence and omissions of state authorities in the years 1989–2021.

In 2022, Spurek voted in favor of the European Parliament resolution that proposes to enshrine the right to safe and legal abortion in the Charter of Fundamental Rights of the European Union.

In the European Parliament, Spurek was also pushing for stronger EU-wide animal rights rules.

She is the author of the "5 for the plant-based industry" proposal, which provides: a ban on advertising meat, milk, eggs; elimination of funds for the promotion of these products; establishment of a fund for the promotion of veganism; classes "Climate and animal rights" from kindergarten; 0% VAT on meat, milk and egg substitutes. This proposal was not supported by any of the political groups in Poland.

In 2021, Spurek proposed the "New 5 for Animals", which provides: a ban on the use of animals in circuses, dolphinariums plus a ban on hunting, including angling by 2023, a ban on opening new farms by 2025, a ban on research using animals by 2030, a 100% ban on animal breeding by 2040, and the introduction of animal protection into the Polish Constitution as soon as possible.

In 2022, as part of her parliamentary program "Free from Farms", Spurek published a free expert study “Smród, krew i łzy. Włącz myślenie, bądź zmianą" (Stench, Blood and Tears. Turn on Thinking, Be the Change), which focuses on the impact of factory farms and the livestock sector in Poland on the environment, human rights, and animal rights.

Spurek was also discussed in news media as the 2020 The Left (a left-wing to centre-left political alliance in Poland) candidate for President of Poland, but eventually did not run.

In the 2024 European Parliament elections, she did not seek re-election.

=== Directive of the European Parliament and of the Council on combating violence against women and domestic violence ===
On behalf of the LIBE committee, from 2022 to 2024, Spurek was the only Polish MEP fulfilling the role of a European Parliament's rapporteur for the Directive of the European Parliament and of the council on combating violence against women and domestic violence.

The Directive includes provisions on the protection of women from cyberviolence proposed by Spurek in her Report containing recommendations to the commission on combating gender-based violence in the field of cyberviolence from December 2021.

Referring to research from Spain, where new regulations take into account the needs of domestic violence victims who care for animals, Spurek has drawn up and proposed solutions in this respect for the EU Directive. Available data demonstrates that half of Spanish women experiencing violence have companion animals under their care, and more than half of them do not leave the violent home fearing for the safety of their animals. Although the proposed provisions were not included in the so-called operative part of the Directive, the legal solution developed by Spurek – a reference to companion animals – was nonetheless included in the preamble, where there is a provision about the so-called vicarious violence and the connection between domestic violence and violence against companion animals.

In January 2024, in a general address to the Minister of Justice Adam Bodnar, the Minister of Equality Katarzyna Kotula and the Minister of Family, Labour and Social Policy Agnieszka Dziemianowicz-Bąk, Sylwia Spurek proposed the introduction of analogous solutions combining the problem of violence against women and violence against so-called companion animals into Polish law. She thus repeated the statement addressed to the Minister of Justice Zbigniew Ziobro and the Minister of Family and Social Policy Marlena Maląg in April 2023.

During legislative work in June 2023, the Council of the EU deleted from the draft Directive Article 5 proposed i.a. by Spurek, which criminalized the crime of rape in accordance with the "only yes means yes" principle. In January 2024, Spurek asked Prime Minister Donald Tusk to change the position of the Polish government in the European Council, because the government of Prime Minister Mateusz Morawiecki had previously openly opposed both Article 5 and the entire draft Directive.

The Directive was adopted by the European Parliament in April 2024, with 522 votes in favor, 27 against and 72 abstentions. Spurek stated that at the trilogue stage the Directive "had few real teeth left", which limited its effectiveness.

== Views and criticism ==
=== Feminatives ===
She is an opponent of the so-called male linguistic dominance and defines herself using feminine endings in the professions she performs.

=== Issue of violence ===
She has been criticized for saying that "violence has a gender, and the gender is male" – suggesting that only men commit domestic violence. Referring to this criticism, Sylwia Spurek said in an interview:

I often say that I do not belittle the harm of any of the victims, I am aware that various groups, including men, experience domestic violence. However, this "also" cannot mean: comparably. The statistics are very clear, they show that most of the adult victims are women.

Spurek criticized Ursula von der Leyen in 2021 for her lack of action towards the Istanbul Convention being ratified by the European Union.

In 2020, she praised the initiative of the Law and Justice government, which introduced a police order for the perpetrator of violence to leave the joint tenancy. Spurek has been striving for an implementation of this mechanism since 2003, but no government has introduced such a provision into the legal system.

=== Gender equality ===
Spurek advocates gender equality. She supports the equalization of the retirement age for women and men. She raised the problem of the lack of popularity of parental leave among men.

=== Reproductive rights ===
Spurek considers the right to abortion to be a human right, and abortion as a simple medical service. Spurek expressed hope that the EU intervention on reproductive rights will be the beginning of a debate on changing the Treaties and expanding EU competences on the matter. She considers that further violations of the rights of EU citizens, as well as breaches of the rule of law in the Member States, clearly demonstrate the need to transfer competences in the field of health protection to the EU institutions. She openly criticized the European Commission, including Commissioner Dalli, for lack of initiative on the protection of reproductive rights and for unwillingness to change her competences.

In 2019, Spurek said that women and girls should have access to affordable and modern contraception, such as through reimbursement of contraceptives. In 2020, she criticized the actions of the Commissioner for Children's Rights in Poland Mikołaj Pawlak, after the decision to remove the topic of contraception from school textbooks.

Spurek criticized Donald Tusk's declarations when he promised that if the Civic Coalition won the parliamentary elections in 2023, it would guarantee legal access to abortion up to the 12th week of pregnancy after the patient”s consultation with a doctor. In a post on the Twitter social media platform, she asked: "For years, hand in hand with the church, he created women's hell, and now he's sending us for consultations?". She stressed that women's reproductive rights should not be the subject of a political play.

Animal rights

On 21 January 2020, five days before the Holocaust Remembrance Day, Sylwia Spurek shared on her Twitter account a graphic by Australian artist Jo Frederiks, which depicted dairy cows in striped shirts decorated with the Star of David. The animals were tied with a chain, and behind them was a blood-stained wall. The MEP maintained that her post was only intended to provoke reflection on animal rights, but that accusations of anti-Semitism and relativising human suffering appeared in the media. Sylwia Spurek responded to the accusations by referring to a quote from Isaac Singer:

The contentment with which man can do whatever he likes with other species illustrates the most extreme racist theories, the principle that the stronger are allowed to do anything.

Spurek is against animal experiments. She considers them to be ineffective and unethical. When in 2019 reports of illegal and extremely inhumane animal experiments in the LPT laboratory near Hamburg came to light, Spurek began working with NGOs to clarify the situation. At that time, she openly criticized EU law and the actions of the EU institutions.

She is a supporter of the ban on animal farming, angling, horse riding and hunting.

In 2020, Spurek objected to the Sejm's proceeding of the bill allowing children to participate in hunting. On this occasion, she criticized the lack of reaction of the Commissioner for Children's Rights, Mikołaj Pawlak, stressing that contact with the killing and suffering of animals has a negative impact on the psychological development in minors.

=== Environmental protection ===
She advocates the need to move away from coal in the Polish and global energy sector. She criticized the investment in the Vistula Spit canal, deeming it unnecessary, costly and harmful to the environment. In 2022, she supported the appeal of non-governmental organizations against the construction of a wall on the Polish-Belarusian border, pointing to its harmfulness to the ecosystem of the Białowieża Forest.

=== Food production system ===
Spurek devotes a large part of her activities to changing the food production system. She is in favor of stopping financing the livestock sector. She stresses that healthy, sustainable food should be affordable, and that subsidies for research and development, investment support for factory farms, and animal feed production should be redirected to the crop production sector. She supported an increase in VAT rates for animal products. Spurek also proposed 0% VAT on plant products. She points out that food production in the modern, mass-production way also leads to food poverty. She advocated the withdrawal of the Polish "Milk at School" program, describing it as indoctrinating. She stresses that the current food production system is also responsible for the climate catastrophe and biodiversity loss by providing unhealthy food that contributes to the suffering of humans and animals. She openly criticises the actions of the European Commission, especially the Farm to Fork Strategy, believing it to be insufficient in the face of the 21st century climate crisis.

=== Refugee issues ===
Spurek stated that the Law and Justice party (PiS) used a strategy to demonize refugees during its campaign in the 2015 parliamentary elections.

In 2021, she expressed criticism of the European Commission's assistance activities for migrants during the crisis on the Polish-Belarusian border. In a speech at the plenary session in Strasbourg, she thanked the NGOs present on the ground and stressed that she considered the Commission to be ineffective.

In a tweet after the debate on the situation on the Polish-Belarusian border in the European Parliament, she stated that the construction of the wall and the setting up of barbed wire on the border had nothing to do with EU values.

During a debate on Russia's aggression against Ukraine in the European Parliament in March 2022, she stressed that the EU's borders should be open to people fleeing war. In May 2022, together with other MEPs, she sent a question to the European Commission asking for information on what assistance is provided to refugees from Ukraine with disabilities.

=== Catholic Church ===
Spurek is a supporter of the separation of the State and the Church and advocates freedom of conscience and religion.

== Personal life ==
On 27 June 2020, she married Marcin Anaszewicz, with whom she has been in a relationship since 2001. The couple cohabited by choice to show support for same-sex couples who do not have the opportunity to marry. Spurek and Anaszewicz got married in 2020, fearing for their legal situation during the COVID-19 pandemic. The couple has no children.

Spurek is autistic.

== Publications ==
- Drogi ku płodności. Wszystko o diagnostyce, leczeniu i metodach wsparcia w niepłodności (2011), praca zbiorowa.
- Izolacja sprawcy od ofiary. Instrumenty przeciwdziałania przemocy w rodzinie (2013), rozprawa doktorska.
- Konwencja o zapobieganiu i zwalczaniu przemocy wobec kobiet i przemocy domowej. Komentarz (2016), współautorka.
- MERITUM Pomoc społeczna. Wsparcie socjalne. Poradnik (2016), praca zbiorowa.
- Związek Partnerski, rozmowy o Polsce (2019), wraz z Marcinem Anaszewiczem.
- Nasza Konwencja (2021).
- Smród, krew i łzy. Włącz myślenie, bądź zmianą (2022).
- Cyberprzemoc wobec kobiet. Nowa twarz starego problemu – raport z badań (2024).

== Nominations and awards ==
In 2024, Sylwia Spurek was nominated for the Woman of the Year award as part of the global Vegan Women Summit event taking place in May 2024 in Los Angeles, USA.
