= Maciej Gdula =

Polish sociologist and politician (born 1977)

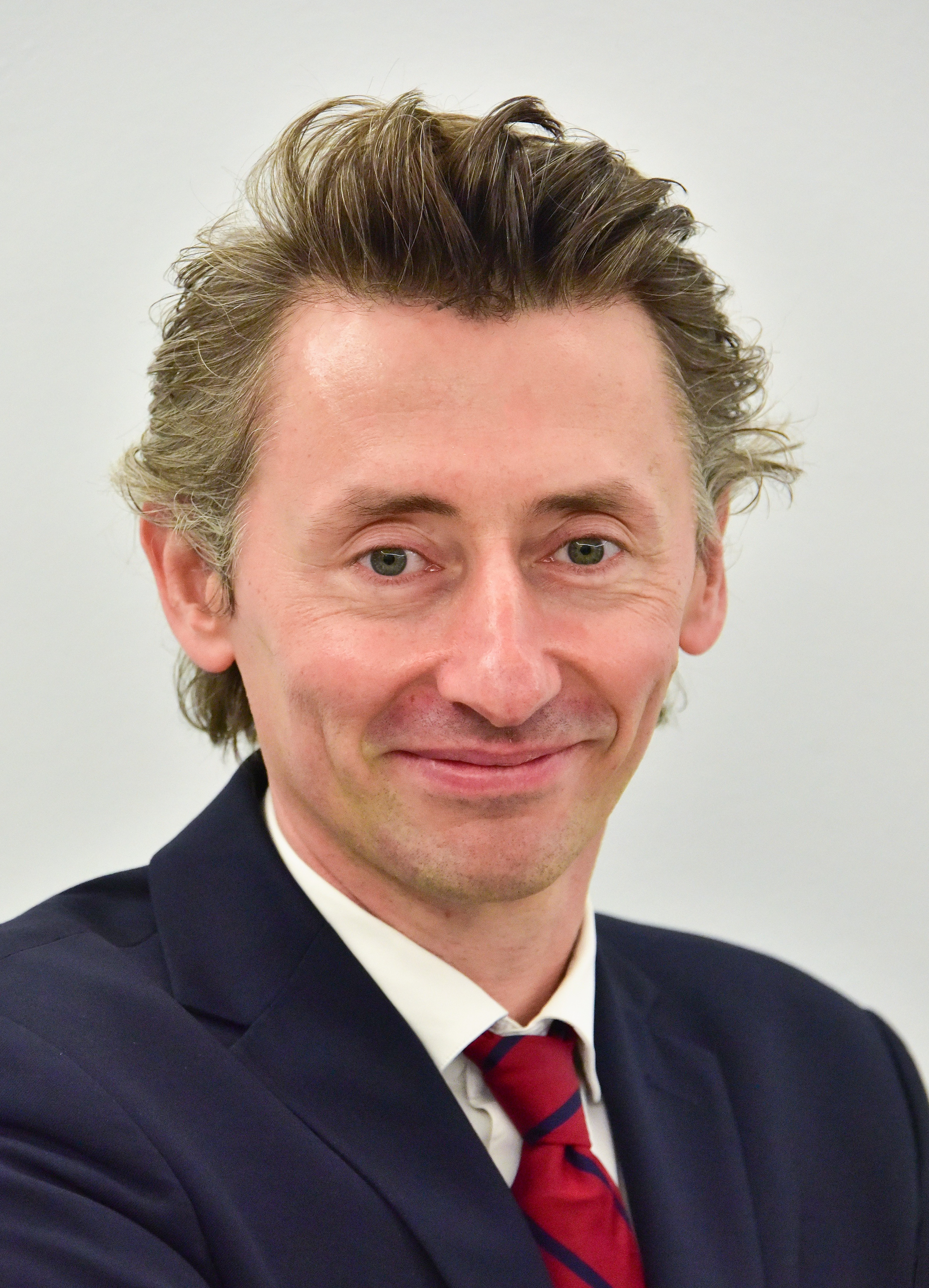
- Gdula in 2019

Undersecretary of State at the Ministry of Science and Higher Education
- In office 20 December 2023 – 14 January 2025
- Minister: Dariusz Wieczorek

Member of the Sejm
- In office 12 November 2019 – 12 November 2023
- Constituency: No. 13 (Kraków)

Personal details
- Born: Maciej Roman Gdula; 20 May 1977 Żywiec, Poland
- Party: Spring (2019–2021); New Left (2021–2025)
- Scientific career
- Education: University of Warsaw
- Fields: Sociology
- Thesis: Utopia, Contract and Nature. Love Discourses in Expert Culture (2006)

Maciej Roman Gdula (born 20 May 1977) is a Polish sociologist, opinion journalist and politician, serving as an assistant professor at the University of Warsaw, his alma mater. He holds a doctorate and habilitation in sociology, and his academic interests are social and political theory, actor–network theory, the study of social classes and lifestyles.

Gdula has also been active in politics and served as Undersecretary of State at the Ministry of Science and Higher Education under Minister Dariusz Wieczorek from 2023 to 2025, during the third cabinet of Donald Tusk. He was previously a member of the Sejm representing the Kraków constituency from 2019 until he failed to win reelection in 2023. Initially, he was affiliated with the Spring party, which merged into the New Left in 2021. Gdula left the party in 2025, following his dismissal from the government.

== Early life and education ==
He is the son of Andrzej Gdula, deputy interior minister of the Polish People's Republic in the 1980s, and later adviser to President Aleksander Kwaśniewski.

Gdula obtained a PhD in sociology in 2006 at the Faculty of Philosophy and Sociology at the University of Warsaw. There, in 2016 he received the postdoctoral degree in social sciences in the field of sociology and became an adjunct at the Institute of Sociology at the University of Warsaw.

== Professional work ==
For several years, he has been a member of the Stanisław Brzozowski Association, a non-profit organization coordinating the actions of Krytyka Polityczna. He was a member of the Association's Board (2005–2010), and a member of its Audit Committee (2010–2015). As an opinion journalist, he contributed to Krytyka Polityczna, as well as to Tok FM Radio morning broadcasts, of which he was a frequent guest.

In 2017, he was the coordinator of a field study in Miastko, an unspecified small, powiat city situated in Mazovia. The report of this study was considered by several sociologists the first authoritative diagnosis of the reasons for the victory of Law and Justice in the 2015 Polish parliamentary election.

== Political career ==
In 2018, Gdula became involved in the development of a new political project initiated and led by Robert Biedroń to establish the Spring (Wiosna) party. He was one of the experts who co-authored its program and is credited with coining the party's name. The party was launched in February 2019 ahead of the European Parliament election in May, in which Gdula led the party list in the Lesser Poland and Świętokrzyskie constituency. He received 38,534 votes (2.21%) and did not win a seat.

In the October 2019 parliamentary election, Gdula ran for the Sejm on The Left coalition's electoral list, which was officially registered as the Democratic Left Alliance (SLD) party list. He was the lead candidate in the Kraków constituency and received 35,279 votes (5.43%), winning a seat. In parliament, he belonged to the coalition's parliamentary group and served on the standing committees on Foreign Affairs and Special Services.

== Books ==
- Trzy dyskursy miłosne (2009)
- Style życia i porządek klasowy w Polsce (2012, with Przemysław Sadura)
- Oprogramowanie rzeczywistości społecznej (2014, with Lech Nijakowski)
- Uspołecznienie i kompozycja. Dwie tradycje myśli społecznej a współczesne teorie krytyczne (2015)
- Dobra zmiana w Miastku. Neoautorytaryzm w polskiej polityce z perspektywy małego miasta (2017, with Katarzyna Dębska and Kamil Trepka)
