= Krzysztof Śmiszek =

Polish lawyer, politician, human rights activist and university lecturer

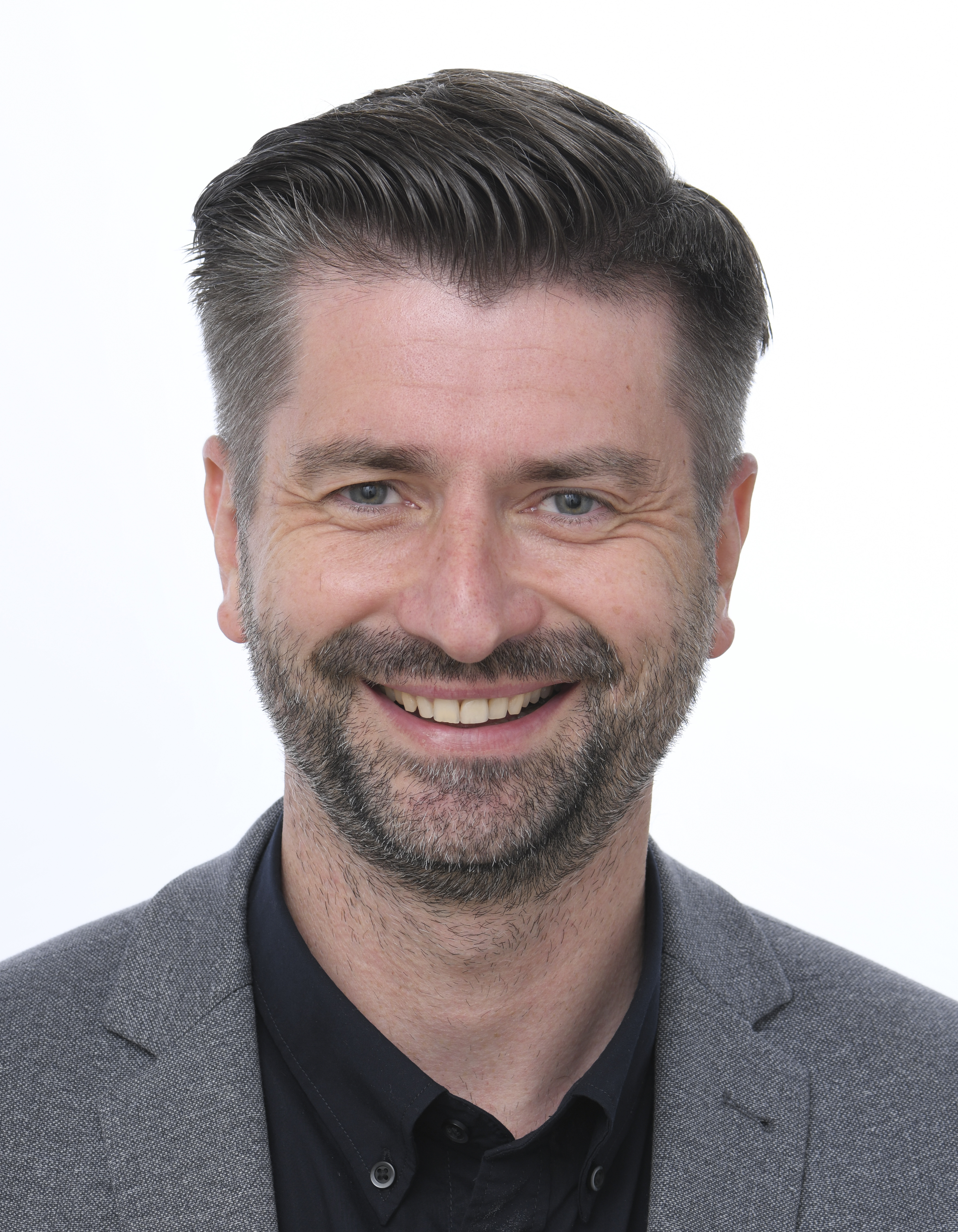
- Śmiszek in 2024

Member of the European Parliament
- Incumbent
- Assumed office 16 July 2024
- Constituency: Lower Silesian and Opole

Member of the Sejm
- In office 12 November 2019 – 10 June 2024
- Parliamentary group: The Left
- Constituency: 3-Wrocław

Deputy Minister of Justice
- In office 13 December 2023 – 13 May 2024 Serving with Arkadiusz Myrcha
- Prime Minister: Donald Tusk
- Minister: Adam Bodnar

Personal details
- Born: 25 August 1979 (age 47) Stalowa Wola, Poland
- Party: New Left (since 2021); Spring (2019–2021)
- Other political affiliations: The Left (since 2019); Progressive Alliance of Socialists and Democrats (since 2024)
- Domestic partner: Robert Biedroń (2002–present)
- Education: University of Warsaw
- Profession: Lawyer

Krzysztof Jan Śmiszek (born 25 August 1979 in Stalowa Wola) is a Polish lawyer, politician, human rights and minority rights activist, and Doctor of Legal Sciences. He is a co-founder and former chair of the Polish Society of Anti-Discrimination Law, a member of the Sejm 9th and 10th terms (2019–2024), vice-chair of the New Left, Deputy Minister of Justice from 2023 to 2024, and a Member of the European Parliament for the 10th term (since 2024).

== Biography ==
=== Education ===
He attended the National Education Commission High School in Stalowa Wola and graduated in 1998. In 2003, he graduated from the Faculty of Law and Administration at the University of Warsaw. In 2006, he completed postgraduate studies in European Law at the same university. In 2016, he earned a PhD in legal sciences, specializing in European law, with a dissertation titled The European Standard of Equality and Polish Law, Substantive and Institutional Aspect, supervised by Mirosław Wyrzykowski. In 2021, he qualified as an attorney.

=== Professional activity ===
In the years 2003–2005, he worked as a lawyer in the Office of the Government Plenipotentiary for Equal Status of Women and Men Izabela Jaruga-Nowacka and Magdalena Środa, where he was involved in the analysis and practical application of anti-discrimination legislation. For several years, he was the head of the Legal Group of the Campaign Against Homophobia Association. In the years 2008–2010, he worked in Brussels as a lawyer and program coordinator at Equinet - European Network of Equality Bodies. In the years 2011–2016, he was a researcher at the Human Rights Department of the Faculty of Law and Administration at the University of Warsaw.

From 2017 to 2019, he was a lecturer at the Faculty of Law, Administration and International Relations at the Krakow Academy Andrzej Frycz Modrzewski. In 2018, he was a scholarship holder at the University of Michigan, the Weiser Center for Europe and Eurasia. He gave guest lectures, including at the University of Toronto and the University of Texas at Austin.

=== Political activity ===
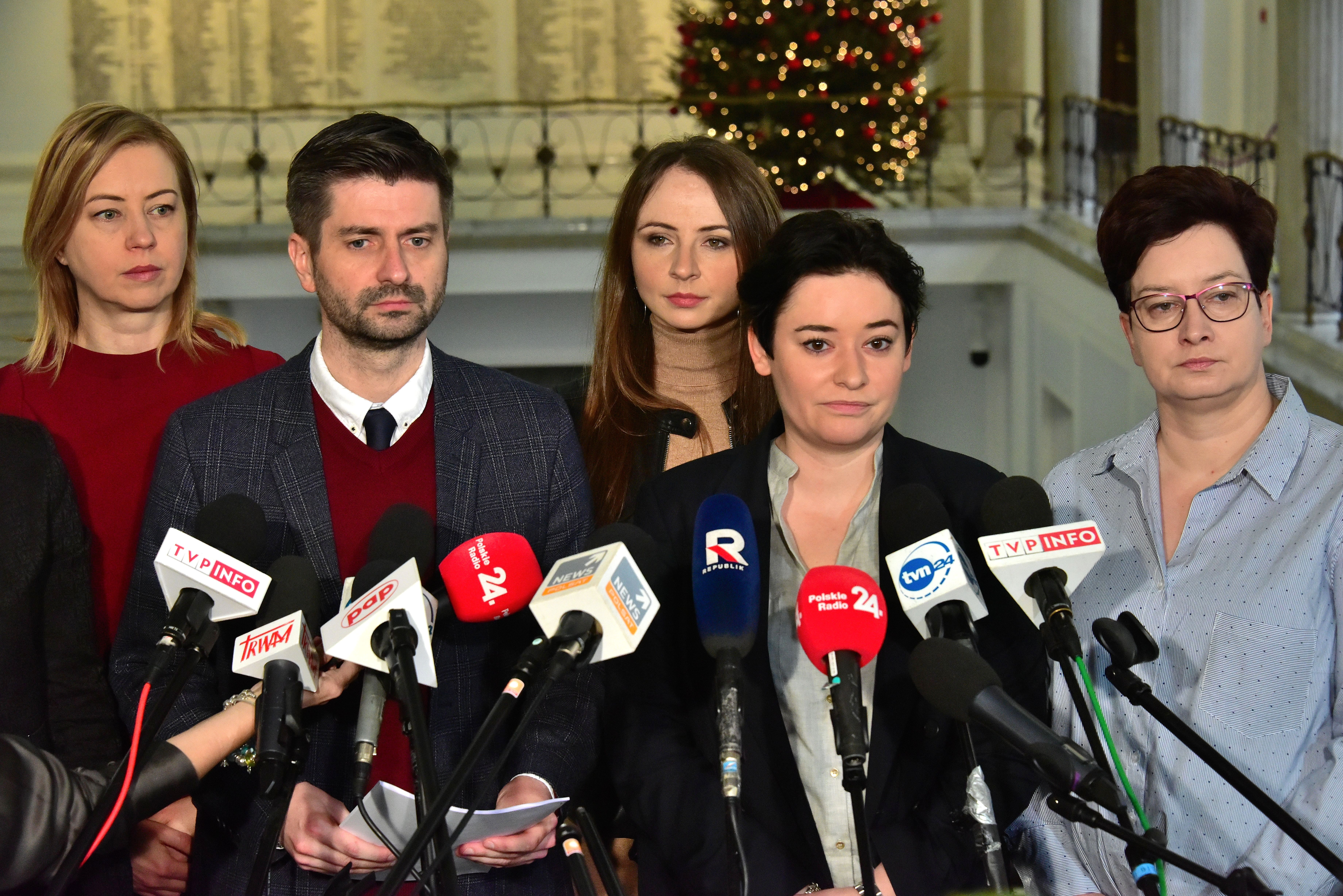
Śmiszek with the Left's deputies during a press conference (20 December 2019)

In 2019, he became involved in the political party Spring. In the elections to the European Parliament 2019, he unsuccessfully applied for a seat in the EP.

In the parliamentary elections in 2019, he was elected a deputy to the Sejm of the Republic of Poland of the 9th term, gaining 43,447 votes. He was elected one of seven vice-chairmen of the Left parliamentary club. In November 2019, he was elected chairman of the newly formed LGBT+ Parliamentary Group on Equal Opportunity, in addition to being a member of the Justice and Human Rights Committee and the European Union Affairs Committee. He was also a member of the Polish delegation to the Parliamentary Assembly of the Council of Europe.

In June 2021, after Wiosna dissolved, he joined the New Left. In October 2021, he became co-chair of the party's regional structures in the Lower Silesian Voivodeship

He was re-elected in the 2023 parliamentary election, gaining 34,577 votes. On 13 December 2023 he was appointed Deputy Minister of Justice (Note: formally known as Secretary of State at the Ministry of Justice) in Donald Tusk's third cabinet.

In 2024, he was elected to the European Parliament (10th term) from The Left list in district no. 12, receiving 70,363 votes. As a result, in June of the same year, he ended his term as Deputy Minister. In the European Parliament, he joined the Legal Affairs Committee and the Committee on Civil Liberties, Justice and Home Affairs.

Results in Nationwide Elections
Election	Electoral Committee	Body	District	Result
2019	Wiosna	European Parliament (9th term)	No. 12	46,698 votes (3.57%) – Not elected
2019	Democratic Left Alliance	Sejm (9th term)	No.3	43,447 votes (6.64%) – Elected
2023	New Left	Sejm (10th term)	No.3	34,577 votes (4.46%) – Elected
2024	The Left	European Parliament (10th term)	No. 12	70,363 votes (6.14%) – Elected

== Publications ==
- Discrimination and Mobbing in Employment (co-author with K. Kędziora), C.H. Beck, Warsaw 2008
- Equal Treatment of LGBT People in Employment – Community Law vs. Yogyakarta Principles, 2009
- A Bird’s Eye View of Equal Treatment Bodies across Europe, 2010
- New Standards of Protection against Discrimination in Polish Law, Legal Education, 2011
- Legal Situation of Transgender People in Poland (co-editor), 2013
- LGBTI Asylum Claims: Central and Eastern European Perspective, Forced Migration Review, 2013
- Combating Sexual Orientation Discrimination in the EU (co-author), 2015
- Anti-discrimination Test Cases: A Practical Guide, 2016
- Freedom of Economic Activity and Anti-Discrimination Standards at Work, 2016
- Commentary on the Act Implementing EU Equal Treatment Directives (co-editor), 2016

== Awards ==
- Economic Personality of the Year 2022, awarded by the Federation of Polish Entrepreneurs
- Equality Crown in the “Political Life” category, awarded by the Campaign Against Homophobia (2022)
- MEP Awards Best Speech of the Year 2025

== Personal life ==
Since 2002, he has been in a relationship with politician, political scientist, and Spring political party leader Robert Biedroń.
