= 2019 European Parliament election in Poland =

- 26 May 2019

All 52 Polish seats to the European Parliament
- Registered: 30,118,852
- Turnout: 13,760,974 (45.7%) ▲21.9 pp
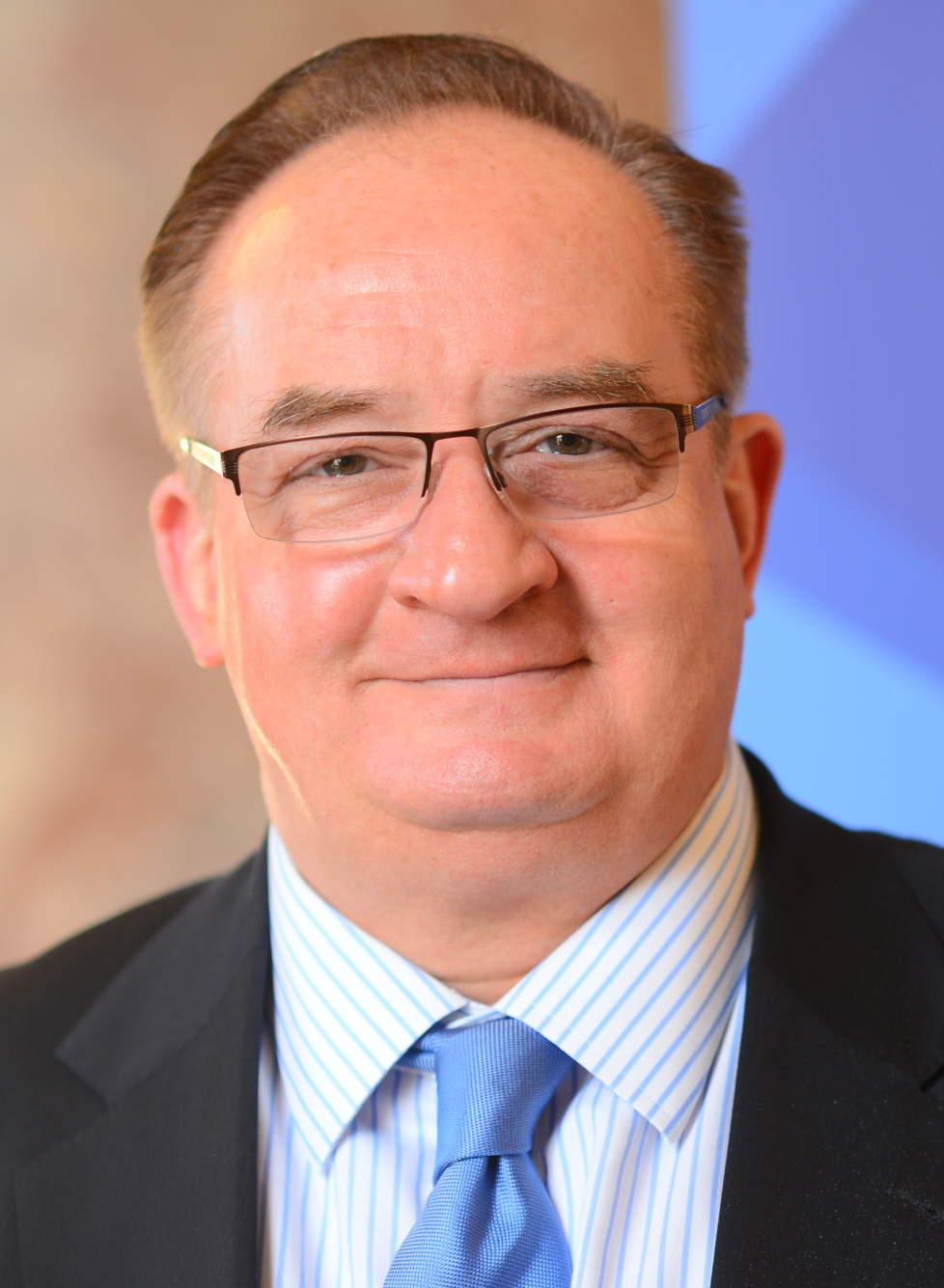

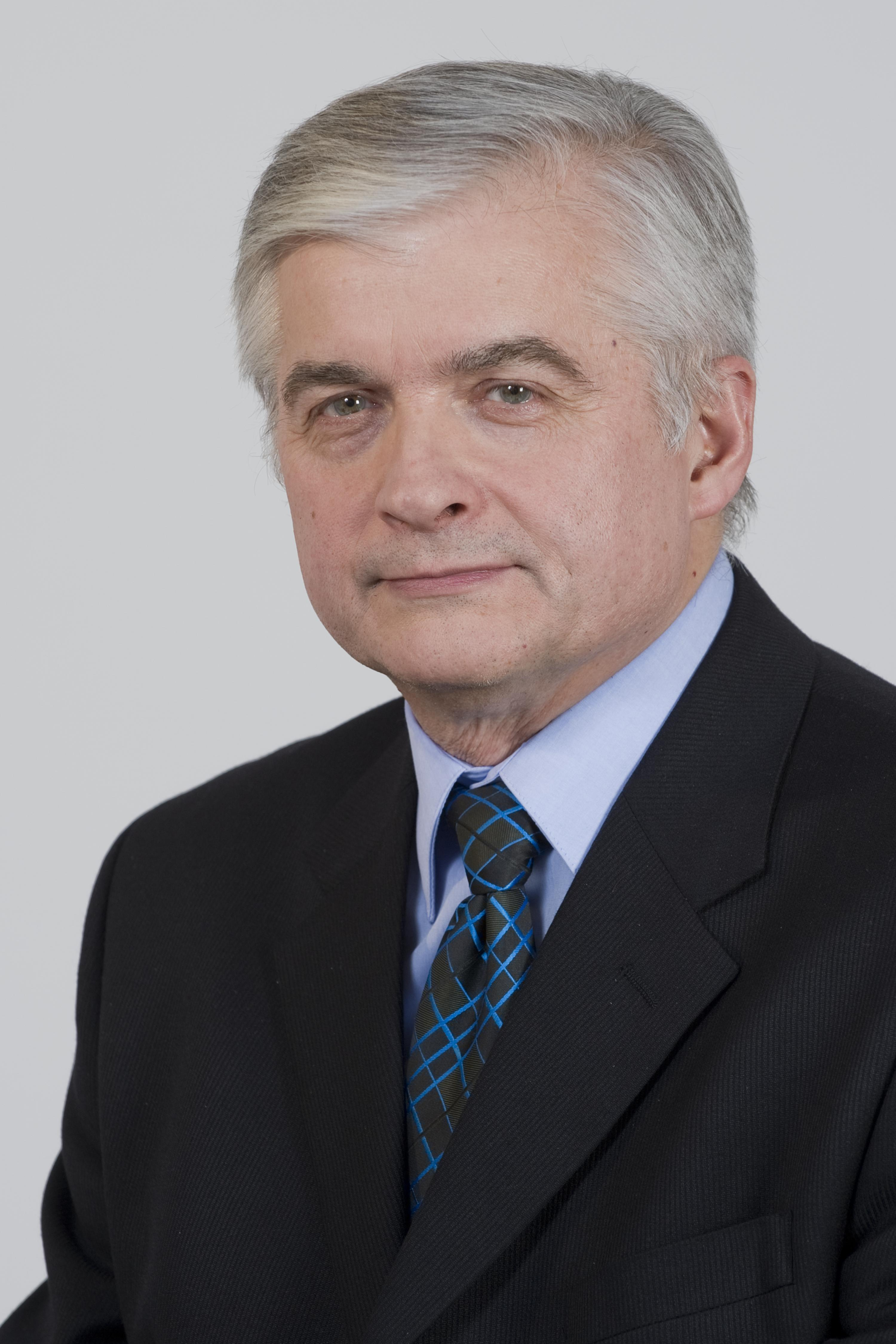

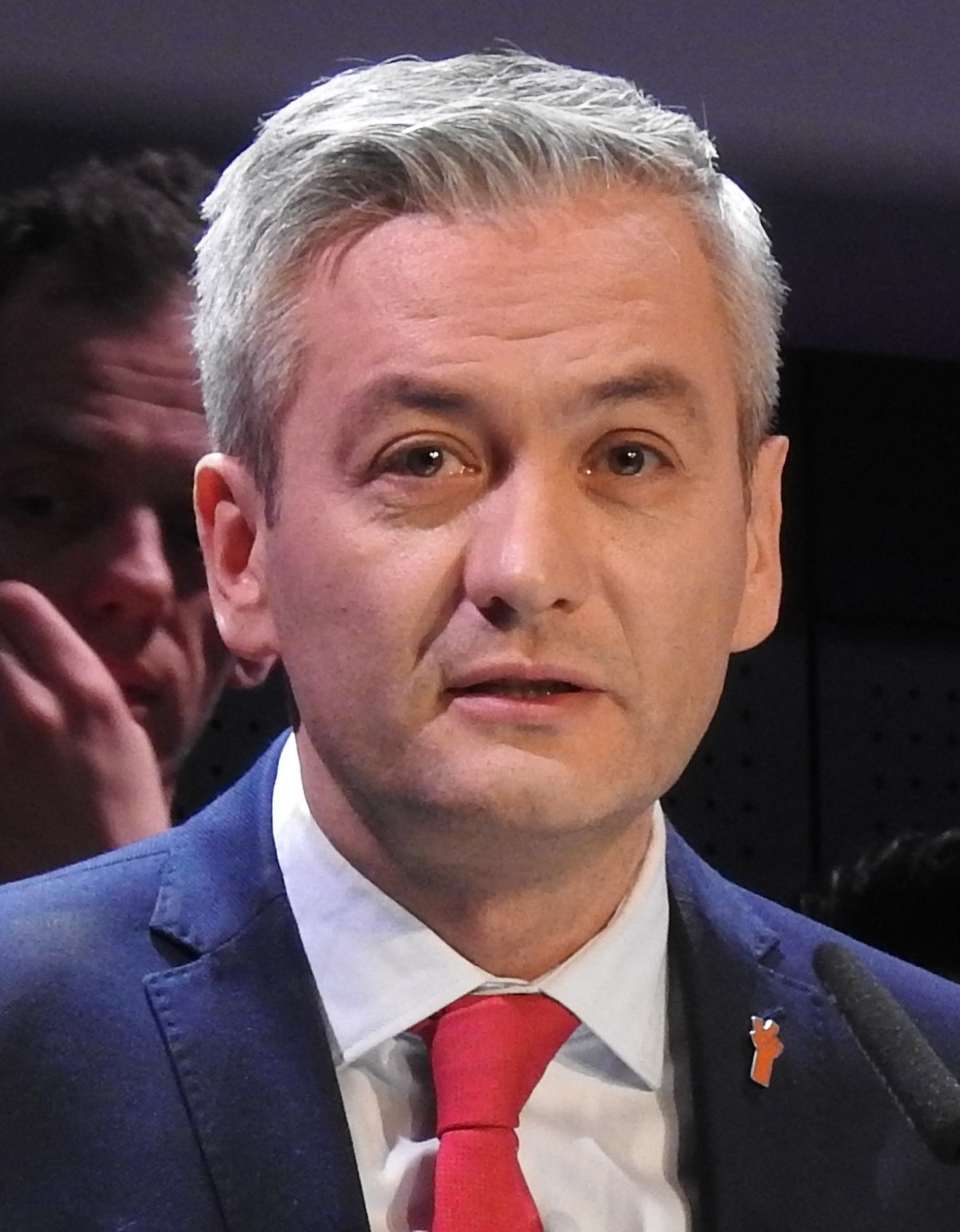
	First party	Second party	Third party
Leader	Jacek Saryusz-Wolski	Włodzimierz Cimoszewicz	Robert Biedroń
Party	PiS	KE (SLD)	W
Alliance	ECR	EPP/S&D/G-EFA/ALDE	S&D
Last election	38.9%, 19 seats (Note: Aggregate results of Law and Justice, Solidary Poland and Poland Together in the last EU election.)	48.7%, 28 seats (Note: Aggregate results of Civic Platform, Democratic Left Alliance - Labour Union, Polish People's Party and the Greens in the last EU election.)	Did not exist
Seats won	27	22	3
Seat change	▲8	▼6	Did not exist
Popular vote	6,192,780	5,249,935	826,975
Percentage	45.4%	38.5%	6.1%
Swing	▲6.5 pp	▼10.2 pp	Did not exist
- Election result and the plurality list's popular vote in each constituency

On Sunday 26 May 2019, a vote was held to elect the Polish delegation to the European Parliament. Polish voters elected 52 MEPs, compared to 51 in the 2014 election. The increased number of MEPs is a result of the 2018 reapportionment of seats in the European Parliament. (Note: If Great Britain leaves the European Union) Following the United Kingdom's announcement, that it will participate in elections to the European Parliament on May 23, Poland will continue to be represented by 51 MEPs. The 52nd MEP will take up their mandate immediately after the UK leaves the European Union. Following the announcement of the election results, the National Electoral Commission indicated Dominik Tarczyński from Lesser Poland and Świętokrzyskie will take up the 52nd seat.

== MEPs by European Political Group (as at 9 April 2019) ==
National party	Seats/51	EP group	Seats/751
Civic Platform	18	European People's Party	217
Polish People's Party	4	European People's Party	217
Law and Justice	15	European Conservatives and Reformists	76
Right Wing of the Republic	1	European Conservatives and Reformists	76
Independents	2	European Conservatives and Reformists	76
Democratic Left Alliance	3	Progressive Alliance of Socialists and Democrats	187
Labour Union	1	Progressive Alliance of Socialists and Democrats	187
Independent	1	Progressive Alliance of Socialists and Democrats	187
Congress of the New Right	2	Europe of Nations and Freedom	37
Independents	1	Europe of Freedom and Direct Democracy	41
Independents	3	Non-Inscrits	22

== Lists ==
=== Electoral committees registered in all constituencies ===
List			Ideology	EU position	Leader(s)	EP Group	2014 result		Seats before the election	Candidates
List			Ideology	EU position	Leader(s)	EP Group	Votes (%)	Seats	Seats before the election	Candidates
1	KON	Confederation KORWiN Braun Liroy Nationalists; Konfederacja KORWiN Braun Liroy Narodowcy List: National Movement (RN); Coalition for the Renewal of the Republic Liberty and Hope (KORWiN); Piotr Liroy-Marzec's Effective (S); Party of Drivers (PK)	Polish nationalism Economic liberalism	Hard Euroscepticism	Janusz Korwin-Mikke; Grzegorz Braun; Piotr Liroy-Marzec; Robert Winnicki	EFDD; NI	1.5%	0 / 51	2 / 51	130
2	W	Spring; Wiosna List: Spring (W); Liberal-Socials (LS); Edward Gierek's Economic Revival Movement (ROG)	Social liberalism Progressivism	Pro-Europeanism	Robert Biedroń	S&D	N/A	0 / 51	0 / 51	130
3	KE	European Coalition; Koalicja Europejska List: Civic Platform (PO); Democratic Left Alliance (SLD); Polish People's Party (PSL); The Greens (Z); Modern (.N); Union of European Democrats (UED); Feminist Initiative (IF); Social Democracy of Poland (SDPL)	Liberalism; Big tent	Pro-Europeanism	Grzegorz Schetyna; Włodzimierz Czarzasty; Władysław Kosiniak-Kamysz	EPP; S&D; ALDE; G–EFA	48.7%	28 / 51	27 / 51	130
4	PiS	Law and Justice; Prawo i Sprawiedliwość List: Law and Justice (PiS); Solidary Poland (SP); Agreement (P)	National conservatism Right-wing populism	Soft Euroscepticism	Jarosław Kaczyński	ECR	38.9%	19 / 51	17 / 51	130
5	LR	Left Together; Lewica Razem List: Together (Razem); Social Justice Movement (RSS); Labour Union (UP)	Democratic socialism Progressivism	Pro-Europeanism	N/A (National Board)	GUE-NGL; S&D	N/A	0 / 51	1 / 51	129
6	K'15	Kukiz'15 List: Right Wing of the Republic (PRP); Real Politics Union (UPR); Direct Democracy (DB)	Right-wing populism Direct democracy	Soft Euroscepticism	Paweł Kukiz	EFDD	N/A	0 / 51	1 / 51	129

=== Electoral committees registered in more than one constituency ===
List			Ideology	EU position	Leader(s)	EP Group	2014 result		Seats before the election	# of constituencies	Candidates
List			Ideology	EU position	Leader(s)	EP Group	Votes (%)	Seats	Seats before the election	# of constituencies	Candidates
7	PFP	Poland Fair Play; Polska Fair Play	Conservative liberalism Economic liberalism	Pro-Europeanism	Robert Gwiazdowski	N/A	N/A	0 / 51	0 / 51	6	60
9	PolEXIT	PolEXIT - Coalition; PolEXIT - Koalicja	Right-wing populism	Hard Euroscepticism	Stanisław Żółtek	ENF	7.2%	4 / 51	2 / 51	2	18

=== Electoral committees registered in a single constituency ===
List		Ideology	EU position	Leader(s)	Constituency	Candidates
JN	Unity of the Nation; Jedność Narodu	National conservatism Right-wing populism	Soft Euroscepticism	Romuald Starosielec	5 – Masovian	10

=== Electoral committees withdrawn before the election ===
List			Ideology	EU position	Leader(s)	EP Group	Seats before the election	Candidates
8	RPE	Real Europe Movement – Europa Christi; Ruch Prawdziwa Europa – Europa Christi	National conservatism Political Catholicism	Soft Euroscepticism	Mirosław Piotrowski	ECR	1 / 51	5

== Electoral committees ==
30 committees applied for registration, of which 26 have been registered: 26 political parties, seven voters committees and three coalitions. Four committees were denied registration.

Electoral committees
	Type	Committee	Status
1	Voters	Kukiz'15	Fielded lists
2	Party	11 November Movement	Registered
3	Voters	Confederation KORWiN Braun Liroy Nationalists	Fielded lists
4	Coalition	Left Together - Together Party, Labour Union, RSS	Fielded lists
5	Party	Law and Justice	Fielded lists
6	Voters	Poland Fair Play Nonpartisans Gwiazdowski	Fielded lists
7	Coalition	European Coalition PO PSL SLD .N Greens	Fielded lists
8	Party	Spring of Robert Biedroń	Fielded lists
9	Party	Real Europe Movement – Europa Christi	Retracted lists
10	Party	Slavic Union	Registered
11	Party	Unity of the Nation	Fielded lists
12	Voters	Confederation of Independent Poland - Indomitable	Registered
13	Party	PIAST – Unity of European Nations' Thought	Registered
14	Party	Labour Faction	Registered
15	Coalition	PolEXIT - Coalition	Fielded lists
16	Party	Normal Country	Registered
17	Party	Social Alternative	Registered
18	Party	Agreement of Jarosław Gowin	Registered
19	Party	Responsibility	Registered
20	Party	Right Wing of the Republic	Registered
21	Voters	Kamil Kołobycz	Rejected
22	Party	People's Party "Patrimony" RP	Registered
23	Party	Party of Drivers	Registered
24	Voters	"In Common for Częstochowa"	Registered
25	Party	2nd Republic of Poland	Registered
26	Voters	Engineers and Technicians of Scientific-Technical Associations - Economy	Rejected
27	Voters	Polish Families Together	Registered
28	Party	KORWiN	Rejected
29	Voters	ROP	Registered
30	Voters	Adam Lech Janowski	Rejected

== Electoral calendar ==
The Electoral Commission has published a timetable of the election proceedings:

Date	Event
8 April	Establishment of constituencies' and regional electoral commissions, notification to the Electoral Commission about the establishment of the electoral committees
16 April (midnight)	Deadline for the submission of candidates' lists
26 April	Information about numbers and borders of the voting circuits and circuits' electoral commissions headquarters
25 May (midnight)	Election silence begins
26 May (7:00 to 21:00)	Polling stations are open

== Leaders by constituency ==
Registered lists with a numbers on a ballot paper
Constituency	1	2	3	4	5	6
Constituency	Confederation	Wiosna	KE	PiS	LR	Kukiz'15
1 - Pomeranian	Sławomir Mentzen	Beata Maciejewska	Janusz Lewandowski	Anna Fotyga	Anna Górska	Andrzej Kobylarz
2 - Kuyavian-Pomeranian	Krzysztof Drozdowski	Wanda Nowicka	Radosław Sikorski	Kosma Złotowski	Paulina Matysiak	Paweł Szramka
3 - Podlaskie and Warmian-Masurian	Robert Winnicki	Monika Falej	Tomasz Frankowski	Karol Karski	Bartosz Grucela	Andrzej Maciejewski
4 - Warsaw	Krzysztof Bosak	Robert Biedroń	Włodzimierz Cimoszewicz	Jacek Saryusz-Wolski	Adrian Zandberg	Stanisław Tyszka
5 - Masovian	Kaja Godek	Paulina Piechna-Więckiewicz	Jarosław Kalinowski	Adam Bielan	Dorota Olko	Barbara Husiew
6 - Łódź	Waldemar Utecht	Anita Sowińska	Marek Belka	Witold Waszczykowski	Piotr Ikonowicz	Piotr Apel
7 - Greater Poland	Piotr Liroy-Marzec	Sylwia Spurek	Ewa Kopacz	Zdzisław Krasnodębski	Waldemar Witkowski	Marek Jurek
8 - Lublin	Witold Tumanowicz	Zbigniew Bujak	Krzysztof Hetman	Elżbieta Kruk	Magdalena Długosz	Jarosław Sachajko
9 - Subcarpathian	Grzegorz Braun	Anna Skiba	Czesław Siekierski	Tomasz Poręba	Elżbieta Wisz	Alicja Bobola
10 - Lesser Poland and Świętokrzyskie	Konrad Berkowicz	Maciej Gdula	Róża Thun	Beata Szydło	Jan Orkisz	Paweł Kukiz-Szczuciński
11 - Silesian	Jacek Wilk	Łukasz Kohut	Jerzy Buzek	Jadwiga Wiśniewska	Maciej Konieczny	Grzegorz Długi
12 - Lower Silesian and Opole	Robert Iwaszkiewicz	Krzysztof Śmiszek	Janina Ochojska	Anna Zalewska	Marcelina Zawisza	Agnieszka Ścigaj
13 - Lubusz and West Pomeranian	Krzysztof Tuduj	Anita Kucharska-Dziedzic	Bogusław Liberadzki	Joachim Brudziński	Julia Zimmermann	Olimpia Tomczyk-Iwko

== Opinion polls ==
Graphical summary of opinion polls: Law and Justice European Coalition Spring Kukiz Konfederacja Razem

Fieldwork period	Polling firm	Sample size	PiS				Konfederacja		Others / Don't know	Turnout	Lead
24.05		–	38.1	34.5	7.7	5.8	5.1	3.0	5.8	49.4	4.4
22.05–23.05		–	39.2	38.3	7.9	5.7	5.7	2.6	0.6	37	1
22.05–23.05	IBSP	1,510	36.32	42.51	7.02	4.91	7.23	1.71	0.3	47	6.19
22.05–23.05	Kantar	1,002	36	34	8	4	6	3	9	–	2
21.05–22.05	IB Pollster	1,193	35	37	10	7	6	4	1	–	2
17.05–22.05	Social Changes	1,052	37.2	33.3	9.3	8.9	5.4	2.3	3.6	–	3.9
21.05	IBRiS	–	38.7	35.0	6.3	4.9	6.0	0.0	9	52.8	3.7
18.05–21.05	OPB Ariadna	1,057	33	30	10	8	3	3	13	60	3
16.05–19.05	Kantar	1,006	35	36	10	3	8	1	7	74	1.0
17.05.-18.05.2019	IBRIS	–	37.92	34.73	7.58	5.55	5.54	2.16	6.54	52	3.19
15.05.-16.05.2019	Estymator	1011	40.3	38.5	7.6	5.1	4.9	3.1	–		1.8
10.05.-15.05.2019	Kantar	967	43	28	8	3	4	3	–	60	15
14.05.-16.05.2019	IBSP	1,008	32.94	43.63	9.06	4.89	6.86	2.17	0.45	50.65	10.68
10.05.-13.05.2019	OPB Ariadna	1,053	36	32	10	5	2	2	13	58	4
12.05.2019	IBRiS	–	39.1	34	7.1	5.3	4.2	2.4	7.8	55.3	5.1
9.05.-11.05.2019	Indicator	1,000	35.1	31.9	8.4	5.4	–	–	19.2		3.2
8.05-10.05	Kantar	1,001	34	33	8	5	6	2	12	45	1
7.05-9.05	IBSP	1,011	39.04	41.95	9.57	4.79	1.82	2.67	0.16	47.77	2.91
17.04-6.05	ewybory.eu	12,000	40.23	37.45	8.1	5.2	5.59	2.76	0.69	–	2.78
29.04-30.04	Estymator	1,008	42.1	36.9	7.7	6	3.8	2.9	0.6	–	5.2
26.04-30.04	Social Changes	1,050	36.8	32.6	12.7	8.5	2.9	2.9	3.9	–	4.2
28.04	IBRIS	1,100	38.7	33	8.2	5.4	4.3	3.2	7.3	49	5.7
23.04-26.04	IBSP	1,006	40.25	37.69	10.97	3.72	5.6	1.33	0.44	51.19	2.56
01.04-23.04	CBM Indicator	6,500	40.9	36	7.4	4.5	3.1	2.4	4.8	–	4.9
15.04-16.04	Kantar	1,004	38	35	10	6	5	2	4	46	3
4.04-11.04	CBOS	1,064	41	27	4	3	2	1	22	60	14
10.04-11.04	Estymator	1,016	42	37.7	7.6	6.1	3.8	1.2	1.6	–	4.3
12.04	IBRIS	1,100	38.7	36.2	7.6	5.3	3.8	–	–	–	2.5
11.04	Polska Press		40.7	38.3	7.4	6.3	3.9	–	3.4	–	2.4
4.04-9.04	Kantar MB		36	33	14	4	5	5	3	–	3
11.04	IBRIS		39.4	38.3	3.4	5.6	4.5	0.8	7.8	–	1.1
4.04-6.04	IB Pollster		39	35	10	6	5	3	2	–	4
29.03-30.03	IBRIS		39	36.5	6.1	6	3.9	2	6.5	–	2.5
25.03-27.03	IBSP		38.76	41.51	8.63	4.46	4.25	0.99	1.40	49.4	2.75
27.03	OPB Ariadna		35.5	28.8	11.3	6	3.3	1	14.1	57	6.7
20.03-21.03	Estymator		42.2	39.3	6.1	5.2	3.4	1.9	1.9	–	2.9
18.03-20.03	IBSP		39.35	41.82	7.49	5.04	3.89	1.19	1.22	>51	2.47
18.03	IBRIS		41.6	37.2	6.6	2.9	1.3	2.6	7.9	49.3	4.4
7.03-14.03	CBOS		42	26	4	5	3	1	20	58	16
9.03-10.03	IBRIS		40	38	7	5	3	–	7	48	2
5.03-11.03	Kantar MB		33	35	11	7	3	4	7	–	2
7.03	IBRIS		39.7	38.5	6.2	5.1	4.1	0.9	5.5	–	1.2
28.02-1.03	IB Pollster		38	32	12	8	4	3	3	–	6
2014 result			38.92 (Note: The 2014 tally includes PiS (31.78%), Solidary Poland (3.98%), Poland Together (3.16%))	52.26 (Note: The 2014 tally includes PO (32.13%), SLD–UP (9.44%; although one of the five MEPs is from UP, which in 2019 runs as part of another coalition, "Left-Together"), PSL (6.80%), Europa Plus, Greens (0.32%))	—N/a	—N/a	8.54 (Note: The 2014 tally includes former Korwin-Mikke's party Congress of the New Right (7.15%) and National Movement (1.39%))	—N/a	0.28	23.83	13.34

== Results ==
Results by parliamentary grouping

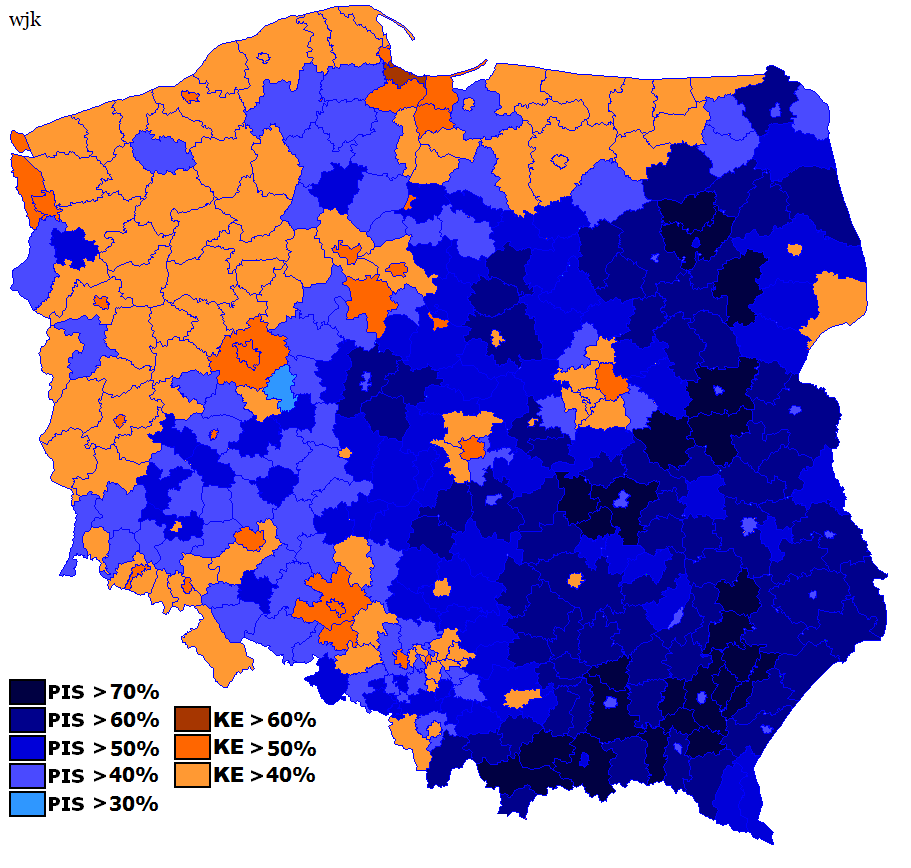
Result by Powiat

The Law and Justice party achieved its highest vote of any Polish elections at 45%.

Party or alliance		Votes	%	Seats	+/–
United Right	Law and Justice	4,775,790	34.99	21	+6
United Right	Solidary Poland	289,536	2.12	1	+1
United Right	Agreement	287,671	2.11	1	+1
United Right	Independents	839,783	6.15	4	+1
United Right	Total	6,192,780	45.38	27	+8
European Coalition	Civic Platform (Note: Includes 199,591 votes and 1 seat for a supported independent.)	2,904,440	21.28	12	−7
European Coalition	Democratic Left Alliance (Note: Includes 423,559 votes and 2 seats for supported independents.)	812,584	5.95	5	+1
European Coalition	Polish People's Party (Note: Includes 35,075 votes and 0 seats for a supported independent.)	617,772	4.53	3	−1
European Coalition	Independents and others	915,139	6.71	2	0
European Coalition	Total	5,249,935	38.47	22	−6
Spring	Spring	493,433	3.62	3	New
Spring	Independents and others	333,542	2.44	0	New
Spring	Total	826,975	6.06	3	New
Confederation		621,188	4.55	0	0
Kukiz'15		503,564	3.69	0	New
Left Together		168,745	1.24	0	New
Poland Fair Play		74,013	0.54	0	New
PolEXIT - Coalition		7,900	0.06	0	–4
Unity of the Nation		2,211	0.02	0	New
Total		13,647,311	100.00	52	+1
Valid votes		13,647,311	99.17		
Invalid/blank votes		113,663	0.83		
Total votes		13,760,974	100.00		
Registered voters/turnout		30,118,852	45.69		
Source: PKW

=== By constituency ===
Constituency	Law and Justice		European Coalition		Spring		Confederation		Kukiz'15		Left Together		Poland Fair Play		Others	
Constituency	%	Seats	%	Seats	%	Seats	%	Seats	%	Seats	%	Seats	%	Seats	%	Seats
1 – Pomeranian	34.53	1	50.66	2	6.15	0	4.01	0	2.67	0	0.96	0	1.02	0	–	–
2 – Kuyavian-Pomeranian	39.24	1	46.01	1	5.94	0	3.80	0	3.87	0	1.14	0	–	–	–	–
3 – Podlaskie and Warmian–Masurian	47.29	2	37.03	1	5.73	0	4.90	0	3.60	0	1.45	0	–	–	–	–
4 – Warsaw	32.32	2	45.17	3	10.28	1	5.18	0	3.60	0	1.79	0	1.66	0	–	–
5 – Masovian	60.20	2	26.69	1	3.91	0	4.10	0	3.27	0	0.76	0	0.80	0	0.26 (Note: Unity of the Nation)	0
6 – Łódź	46.69	2	38.09	1	5.56	0	4.15	0	3.56	0	1.96	0	–	–	–	–
7 – Greater Poland	38.39	2	43.25	2	7.80	1	4.67	0	4.29	0	1.60	0	–	–	–	–
8 – Lublin	58.95	2	28.17	1	3.07	0	4.42	0	4.00	0	0.72	0	0.69	0	–	–
9 – Subcarpathian	65.07	2	21.56	1	3.06	0	5.89	0	3.38	0	0.71	0	–	–	0.32 (Note: PolEXIT - Coalition)	0
10 – Lesser Poland and Świętokrzyskie	56.33	4	29.03	2	4.51	0	4.23	0	3.86	0	0.97	0	0.75	0	0.32	0
11 – Silesian	43.25	3	40.24	3	5.82	1	4.61	0	3.80	0	1.18	0	1.10	0	–	–
12 – Lower Silesian and Opole	38.72	2	43.87	2	6.76	0	4.98	0	4.34	0	1.33	0	–	–	–	–
13 – Lubusz and West Pomeranian	36.85	2	47.76	2	7.46	0	3.88	0	2.95	0	1.11	0	–	–	–	–
Poland	45.38	27	38.47	22	6.06	3	4.55	0	3.69	0	1.24	0	0.54	0	0.08	0
Source: National Electoral Commission
