= Anita Sowińska =

Polish politician (born 1973)

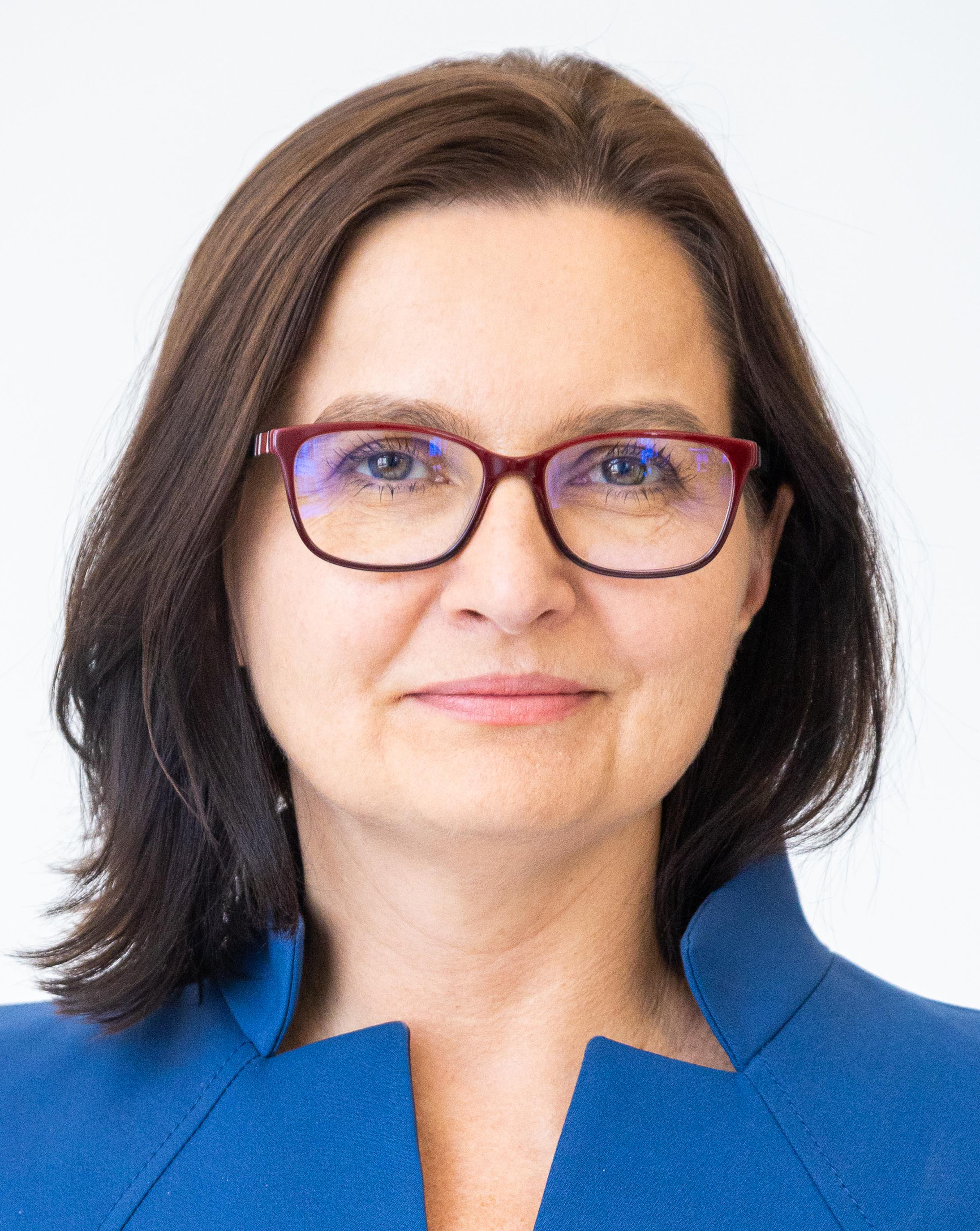
- Sowińska in 2022

Undersecretary of State for Climate and Environment
- Incumbent
- Assumed office December 2023
- Prime Minister: Donald Tusk

Member of the 9th Sejm
- In office 12 November 2019 – 12 November 2023
- Constituency: Constituency no. 10

Personal details
- Born: July 26, 1973 (age 53) Tomaszów Mazowiecki
- Party: Spring (until 2021); New Left (since 2021)
- Education: Lodz University of Technology

Anita Sowińska (born 26 July 1973) is a Polish economist and politician. Since December 2023, she has been undersecretary of state at the Ministry of Climate and Environment. She is a member of the New Left, and was previously a board member of Spring, a centre-left party.

She was a member of the 9th Sejm from November 2019 to November 2023 after winning 13,023 votes in Sejm Constituency no. 10 (Piotrków Trybunalski) at the 2019 parliamentary elections. Sowińska also ran unsuccessfully for the European Parliament in Łódź constituency at the 2019 elections.

Sowińska was criticised by the "Never Again" Association for making posts with "xenophobic overtones" on Twitter during the campaign for the 2023 parliamentary elections. She wrote that Law and Justice was conducting a "hybrid war with the EU" by "bringing in hundreds of thousands of immigrants ... from countries submerged in terrorism", also suggesting that migrants were the "fifth column" of the European Union.

== See also ==
- 9th term Sejm and 10th term Senate of Poland
- List of Sejm members (2019–23)
