= Real Europe Movement =

Real Europe Movement – Europa Christi Ruch Prawdziwa Europa – Europa Christi
- Abbreviation: RPE
- Chairman: Mirosław Piotrowski
- Founded: November 2018
- Split from: Law and Justice
- Headquarters: ul. Odlewnicza 12 m. 24, Lublin
- Ideology: National conservatism Political Catholicism
- Political position: Right-wing
- European Parliament group: European Conservatives and Reformists
- Sejm: 0 / 460
- Senate: 0 / 100
- European Parliament: 0 / 53
- Regional assemblies: 0 / 552
- Mayors: 0 / 2,476
- Powiat Councils: 0 / 6,170
- Gmina Councils: 0 / 39,416

Website
- https://rpeu.pl/

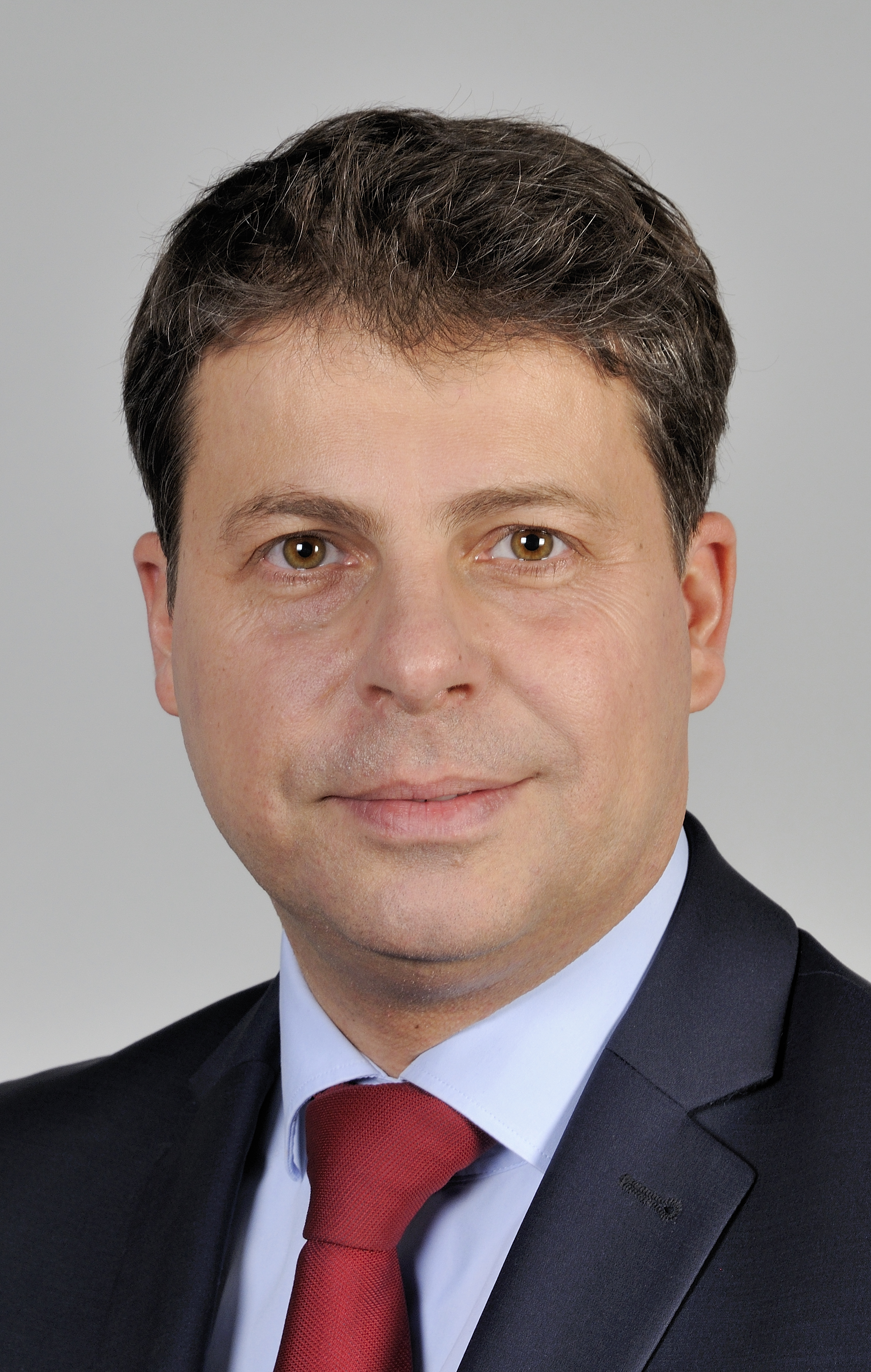
Party chairman Mirosław Piotrowski

Real Europe Movement – Europa Christi (Polish: Ruch Prawdziwa Europa – Europa Christi, RPE) is a Polish right-wing political party founded in November 2018 by Mirosław Piotrowski, formally registered on 12 February 2019. From 31 March 2023, it is associated with Confederation Liberty and Independence.

== History ==
The party was created in November 2018 by an independent MEP from ECR Group, Mirosław Piotrowski (elected from Law and Justice list and associated with Radio Maryja). On 27 November, he applied the party for registration together with Małgorzata Banach and Mariusz Książek. It was registered on 12 February 2019.

In March 2019, it was announced that the party would run in the 2019 European Parliamentary election together with Right Wing of the Republic and Union of Christian Families. However, in April most of Right Wing of the Republic (including its founder and MEP, Marek Jurek) decided to run with Kukiz’15 instead. The committee managed to register lists in two constituencies. RPE decided to withdraw from the election, instead of opting to focus on parliamentary and presidential elections. In the 2019 Polish parliamentary election, the party did not field any Sejm lists but had three candidates to the Senate under "List of Mirosław Piotrowski to the Senate" committee. They received 0.19% of the nationwide vote.

In December 2019, the party held a convention to elect a board of directors. It included former members of Right Wing of the Republic such as Krzysztof Kawęcki (who later left the party in October 2020).

Its chairman, Mirosław Piotrowski was a candidate in the 2020 Polish presidential election, coming in last place with 0.11% of the vote. In the second round, he did not support neither Andrzej Duda, nor Rafał Trzaskowski.

On 31 March 2023, the party established cooperation with Confederation of the Polish Crown to field candidates on the lists of Confederation Liberty and Independence. In the 2023 Polish parliamentary election, Piotrowski became one of Confederation's Senate candidates, while vice-chairman Leszek Szymański run to the Sejm. Neither of them managed to receive a seat. In the 2024 European Parliament election, Mirosław Piotrowski ran on Confederation list in Lublin constituency.

== Platform ==
Real Europe Movement is focused on defending Christian values. The party declares its opposition to abortion, euthanasia and "LGBT ideology". It supports strengthening the role of families, the idea of "Europe of Nations" with less EU-wide regulations, as well as defending the Polish countryside and environment. It also supports „dismantling the dictate of large foreign big-box retail chains on the Polish market”.

It opposes creation of European army, instead wanting to focus on alliance with United States within NATO. Despite this, after the start of the Russian invasion of Ukraine in 2022, its chairman signed a declaration claiming that Ukraine and NATO caused the conflict.

== Structure ==
Chairman:

- Mirosław Piotrowski

Vice-chairmen:

- Jerzy Jarosiński
- Leszek Szymański
- Kazimierz Zych

== Election results ==
=== Presidential ===
Election year	Candidate	1st round		2nd round	
Election year	Candidate	No. of overall votes	% of overall vote	No. of overall votes	% of overall vote
2020	Mirosław Piotrowski	21,065	0.11% (#11)		
2025	Grzegorz Braun	1,238,462	6.35 (#4)		

=== European Parliament ===
Election	Leader	Votes	%	Seats	+/–	EP Group
2024	Mirosław Piotrowski	1,420,287	12.08% (#3)	0 / 53	New	–
2024	As part of the Confederation coalition, that won 6 seats in total.					
