= Mirosław Piotrowski =

Polish politician

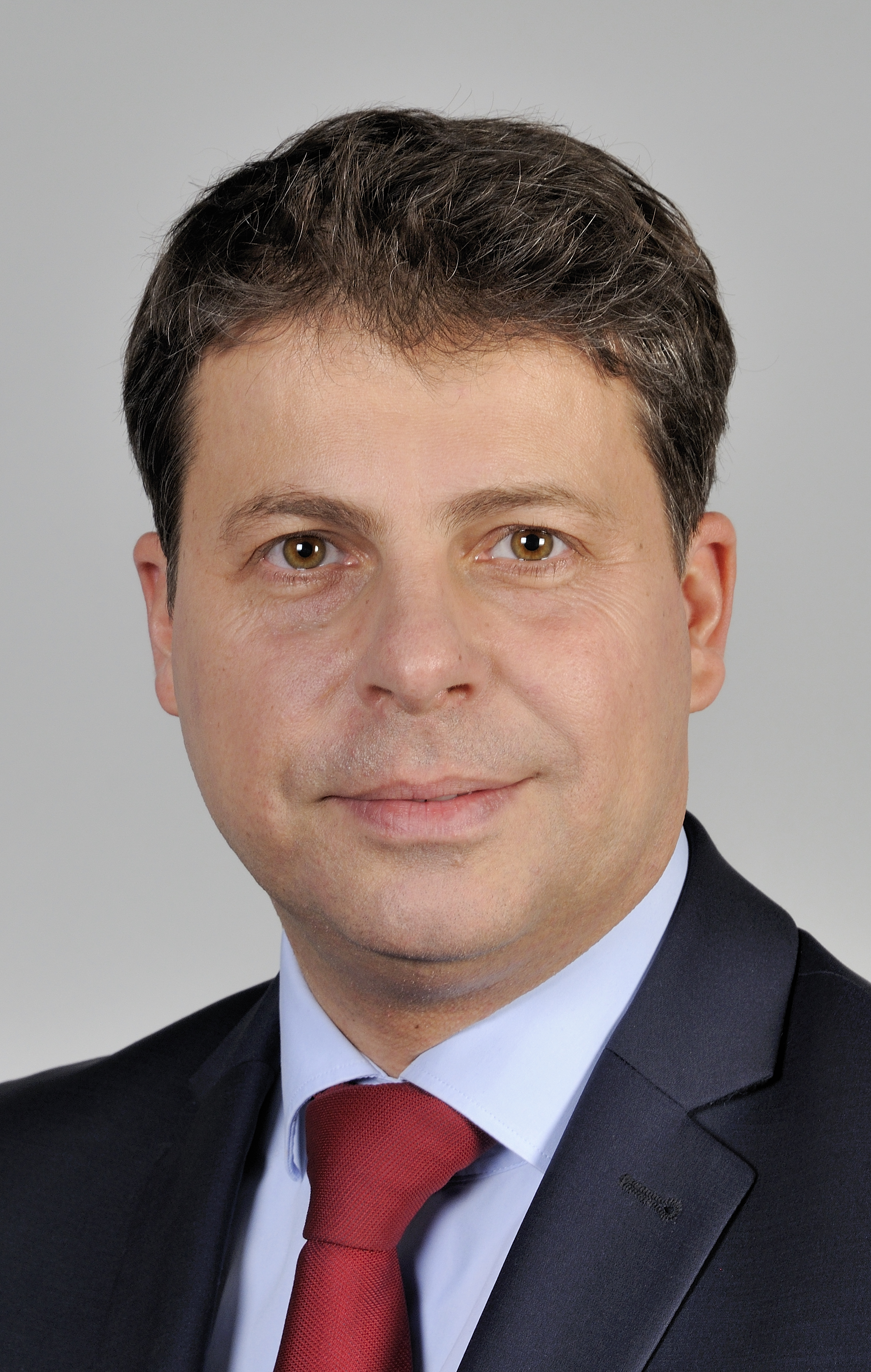
- Piotrowski in 2014

Member of the European Parliament
- In office 20 July 2004 – 1 July 2019

Personal details
- Born: 9 January 1966 (age 60) Zielona Góra, Poland
- Party: League of Polish Families (2004-2008); Law and Justice (2009-2012, 2014); Real Europe Movement (2019-)
- Education: Catholic University of Lublin (Ph.D)

Mirosław Mariusz Piotrowski (born 9 January 1966 in Zielona Góra) is an independent Polish politician and Member of the European Parliament (MEP). He was originally elected in 2004 with the League of Polish Families, then part of the Independence and Democracy grouping. At the 2009 election, he was re-elected for Law and Justice.

He left Law and Justice in January 2012 and to sit as an independent MEP in the European Conservatives and Reformists group, alongside Law and Justice, but became reconciled with his old party, to again become its representative for the 2014 European Parliamentary elections.

Piotrowski was a member of the European Parliament's Committee on Foreign Affairs. He was a substitute for the Committee on Regional Development and a vice-chair of the Delegation for Relations with Australia and New Zealand.

He participated in the 2020 Polish presidential election during which he received 21,065 votes (0.11%), coming last out of eleven candidates.

== Education ==
- 2003: Masters (1990), Doctorate (1993), Catholic University of Lublin (KUL), assistant professor, Nicolas Copernicus University (2001) and associate professor KUL

== Career ==
- 1994-2000: Scholarships from the Herder Institut (Germany), Konrad Adenauer Foundation (Germany), Conference of German Academies of Sciences (Germany), the Foundation for Polish Science (Poland), and the University of Leuven (Belgium).
- 2002: Prize of the Prime Minister of the Republic of Poland awarded to the qualifying thesis for an assistant professorship on the remigration of Poles from Germany 1918-1939 'Reemigracja Polaków z Niemiec 1918-1939'
