= Magdalena Środa =

Polish politician

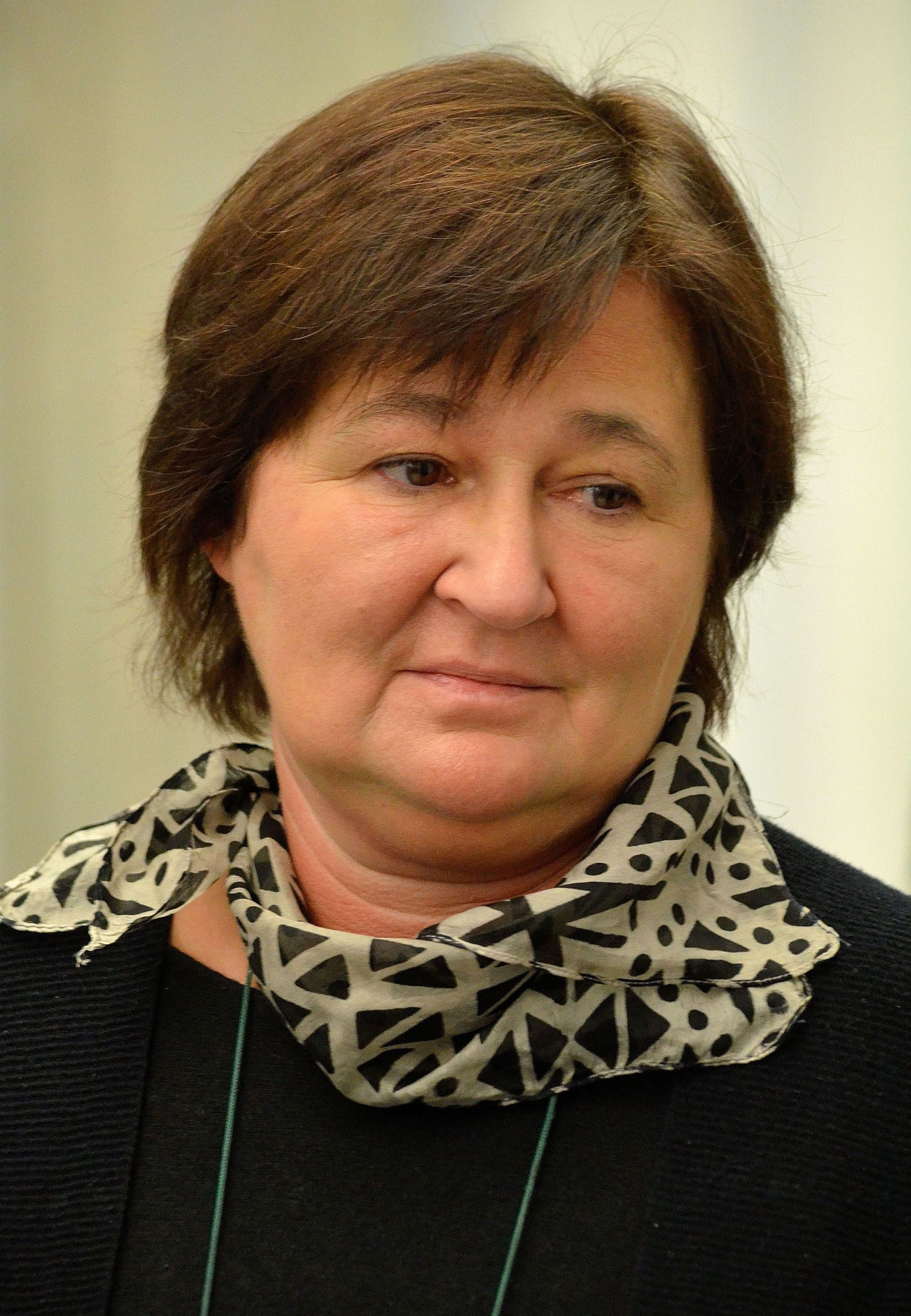
- Magdalena Środa (2014)
- Born: Magdalena Ciupak; January 7, 1957 (age 69); Warsaw, Poland
- Education: University of Warsaw
- Occupations: philosopher, ethicist, author
- Title: Extraordinary professor of ethics at the University of Warsaw
- Spouse: Krzysztof Środa
- Children: 1 (daughter)
- Parent(s): Edward Ciupak (deceased); Ewa Ciupak

Magdalena Środa (née Magdalena Ciupak, b. January 7, 1957 in Warsaw) is a Polish feminist politician and philosopher, extraordinary professor of ethics at the University of Warsaw, and a feminist author. She is also a columnist for the Gazeta Wyborcza. She was government's Plenipotentiary for the Equal Status of Women and Men in the cabinet of Marek Belka between August 16, 2004 and November 4, 2005.

== Life and career ==
She studied philosophy at the University of Warsaw, where in 1982 she obtained her doctoral degree. Between 1982 and 1991, she worked as an assistant and later assistant professor at the Faculty of Ethics of the University of Warsaw. She currently works at the faculty as an associate professor.

In 1980s Magdalena Środa was active in Solidarność movement. After 1989 she would not be involved in politics until 2004, when she was appointed by PM Marek Belka as the government's Plenipotentiary for the Equal Status of Women and Men. She has been advocating the separation of State and Church, LGBT rights, and more liberal abortion law. She is also known for her consistently anti-war stance on foreign policy.

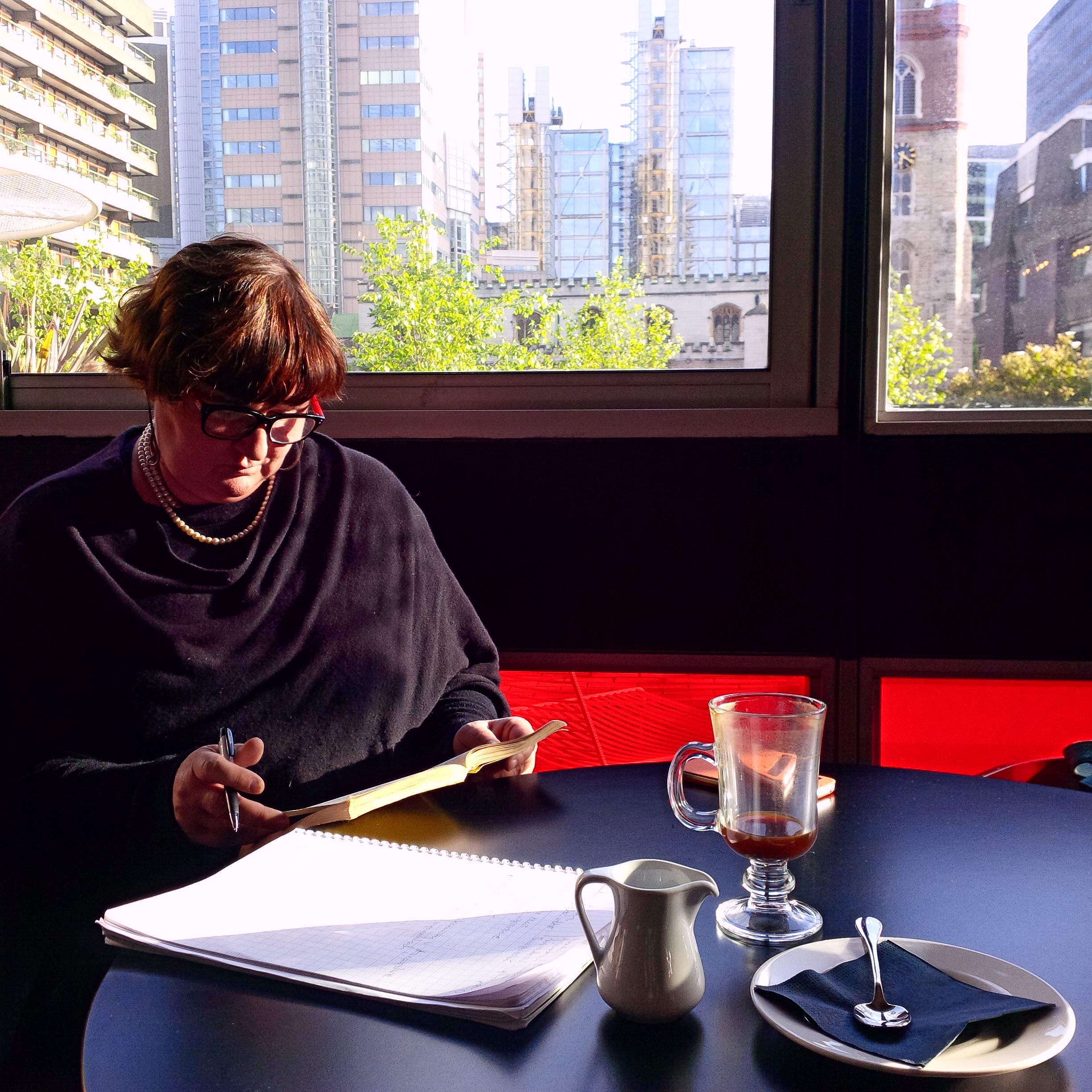
Magdalena Środa at Barbican

In December 2004 there was a controversy over Środa's statement during an international conference on honour killings in Stockholm. When asked about the situation in Poland, she told Reuters: "Catholicism does not directly support or oppose violence against women. But there are indirect links through culture which is strongly based on religion". These words were widely quoted in Polish media and sparked a public discussion about violence against women.

Another controversy blew up in March 2008 when Środa spoke publicly against the idea of protective measures for pregnant women in labour relations. When criticised by parts of feminist movement for neglecting issues of social and economic justice, she responded: "either we do fight for serious treatment on labour markets or for the role of a holy cow because of an inseminated egg".

Her academic research is focused on questions of individualism and its different critiques (from postmodern, feminist and communitarian positions) as well as on the ethics and politics of gender relations.

Top candidate to the European Parliament in 2009 from the list of red-orange-green coalition of Social Democracy of Poland-Democratic Party – demokraci.pl-Greens 2004 (recommended by Zieloni 2004) in Łódź region. She received 10 798 votes (2,25% of all votes in her region). Coalition did not pass 5% threshold.

== Bibliography ==
- Idea godności w kulturze i etyce (The Idea of Dignity in Culture and Ethics), Institute of Philosophy and Sociology of the University of Warsaw, 1993
- Idee etyczne starożytności i średniowiecza: podręcznik do etyki dla I klasy szkoły średniej, WSiP, Warsaw, 1994
- Idee etyczne czasów nowożytnych i współczesności: podręcznik do etyki dla II klasy szkoły średniej, WSiP, Warsaw, 1998
- Indywidualizm i jego krytycy (Individualism and Its Discontents), Fundacja Aletheia, Warsaw, 2003
- Kobiety i władza (Women and Power), Wydawnictwo W.A.B., Warsaw 2009
- Etyka dla nauczycieli, Fundacja im. F. Ebeta, 2009
- Mała książka o tolerancji, Czarna Owca, Warsaw, 2010
- Ta straszna Środa?, Czerwone i Czarne, Warsaw, 2011
- Etyka dla myślących: podręcznik dla szkół ponadgimnazjalnych, Czarna Owca, Warsaw, 2011
- O gender i innych potworach, Czarna Owca, Warsaw, 2014
- Obcy, inny, wykluczony, słowo/obraz terytoria, Gdańsk, 2020

== See also ==
- Feminism in Poland
