= Robert Biedroń =

Polish politician and LGBT activist

Robert Biedroń MEP
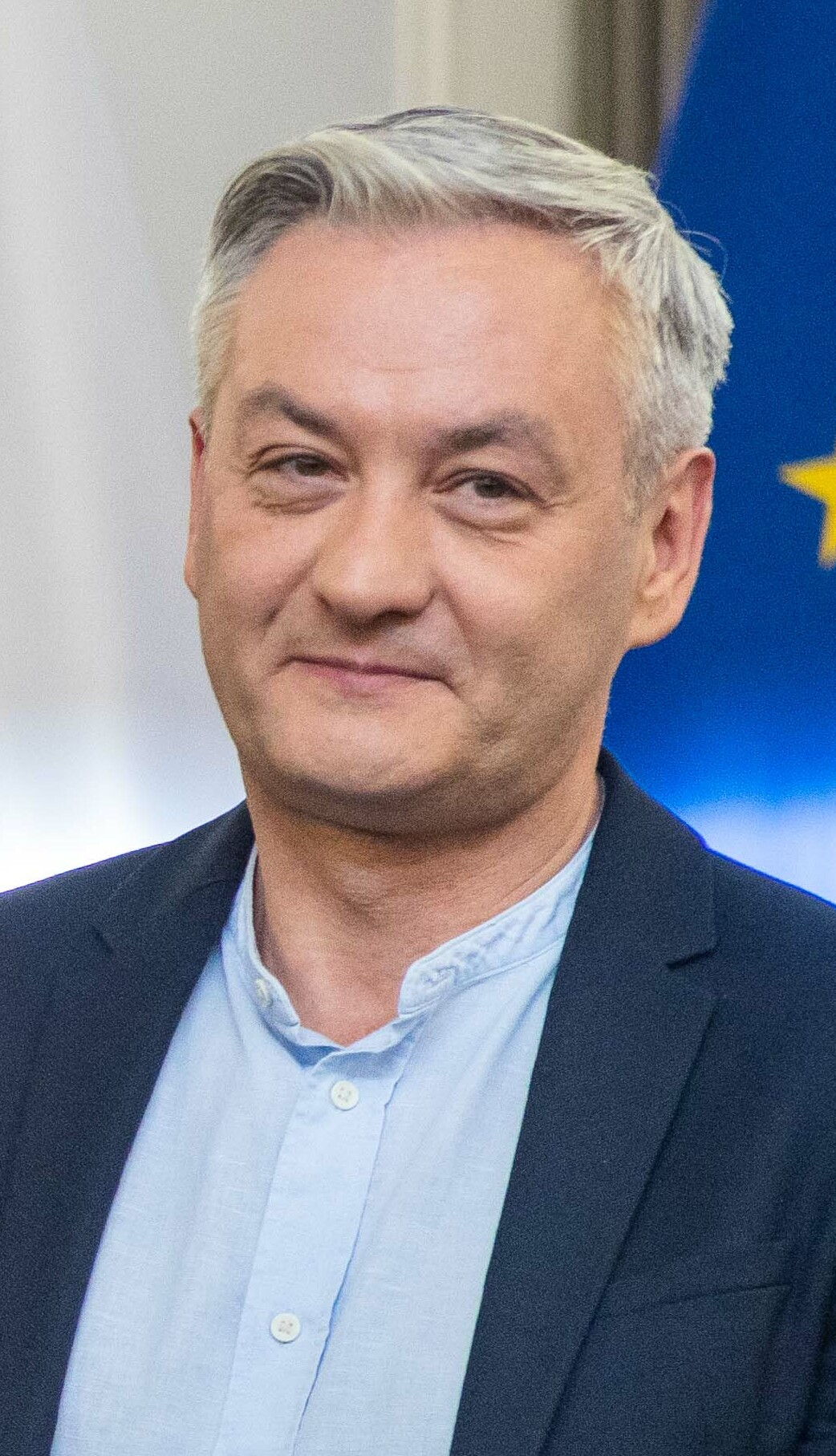
- Official portrait, 2024

Leader of New Left
- In office 9 October 2021 – 14 December 2025 Serving with Włodzimierz Czarzasty
- Preceded by: Position established Włodzimierz Czarzasty (as Leader of the Democratic Left Alliance)
- Succeeded by: Włodzimierz Czarzasty

Member of the European Parliament
- Incumbent
- Assumed office 1 July 2019
- Constituency: Warsaw

Leader of Spring
- In office 3 February 2019 – 11 June 2021
- Preceded by: Position established
- Succeeded by: Position abolished

Mayor of Słupsk
- In office 6 December 2014 – 21 November 2018
- Preceded by: Maciej Kobyliński
- Succeeded by: Krystyna Danilecka-Wojewódzka

Member of the Sejm
- In office 9 October 2011 – 6 December 2014
- Constituency: 26-Słupsk

Personal details
- Born: 13 April 1976 (age 50) Rymanów, Subcarpathian Voivodeship, Poland
- Party: New Left (Since 2021) Progressive Alliance of Socialists and Democrats (Since 2019)
- Other political affiliations: Democratic Left Alliance (1998–2005); Your Movement (2011–2019); Spring (2019–2021)
- Education: University of Warmia
- Website: www.robertbiedron.pl

Robert Biedroń (Polish pronunciation: [ˈrɔbɛrd ˈbjɛdrɔj̃]; born 13 April 1976) is a Polish politician, former mayor of Słupsk, and LGBT activist who has been serving as a Member of the European Parliament since 2019. He was the Chair of the Committee on Women's Rights and Gender Equality (FEMM) in the European Parliament. He is the Chair of Delegation for relations with the countries of the Andean Community and the Vice-Chair of the Committee on Development.

Biedroń was a member of the Sejm during its 7th session (2011–2014). He's also a former member of the Parliamentary Assembly of the Council of Europe and the Congress of Local and Regional Authorities of the Council of Europe. He was the mayor of Słupsk from 2014 to 2018.

Biedroń launched a new political party called Spring in February 2019, and was elected as the Member of the European Parliament on his party's list on 26 May 2019. He is one of the three leaders of The Left (Lewica), a political alliance founded to contest the 2019 parliamentary election composed of the Democratic Left Alliance (SLD), Spring and the Left Together (Lewica Razem).

He ran as a candidate for president of Poland in the 2020 election and received 2.21 percent of all votes, making him the sixth most popular candidate.

== Early life and education ==
Biedroń was born on 13 April 1976 in Rymanów, in Podkarpackie Voivodeship. He grew up in Krosno.

Biedroń completed his secondary education in Ustrzyki Dolne. He received a bachelor in Political Science at the University of Warmia and Mazury in Olsztyn (2000). He received a master's degree in the same field in 2003. He is also a graduate of the School of Political and Social Leaders and the School of Human Rights at the Helsinki Human Rights Foundation.

Aside from his native Polish, Biedroń speaks English, French, Russian, Esperanto and Italian.

== Activism ==
Biedroń has co-operated with Polish and international LGBT rights organizations for many years. Following his studies, he travelled to London and joined the British NGO OutRage!.

Biedroń participated in the first Gay Pride ever organized in Poland on 1 May 2001. In September 2001, he co-founded the Polish Campaign Against Homophobia (Kampania Przeciw Homofobii).

Biedroń's commitment to LGBT rights has been recognized several times: he received, for instance, the "Rainbow Laurels" in 2003 and was named "Rainbow Man" in 2004.

Faithful to Your Movement's values, to social liberalism, secularism and a Europhile vision of the EU; he advocates for a separation of church and state in practice and not just in words, for the removal of catechism classes from public schools, he supports feminism (notably the right to abortion for all women), same-sex marriages in Poland, free access to contraception and sexual education.

Biedroń founded the Institute for Democratic Thought (Instytut Myśli Demokratycznej), a progressive think-tank which conducted a program entitled Scenarios for Poland. The Institute analysed the possible evolutions of the country in the next 20 years and formulated policy recommendations. Robert Biedroń has also built the Progressive Cities' network – a platform of cities' cooperation and good practice exchange aimed at supporting local, progressive politics based on participatory democracy, transparency and an open local community.

Biedroń is the author of several books, notably a handbook on the functioning of a democracy for children Turn Democracy On (Włącz Demokrację), his autobiography Against the current (Pod prąd) and a book entitled New Chapter (Nowy rozdział) which contains his political reflections, published a few months before the launch of his political party.

== Political career ==
=== Early political career (2005–2014) ===
In 2005, Biedroń was an unsuccessful Democratic Left Alliance (SLD) candidate for the Sejm, the lower house of the Polish parliament. In the October 2011 parliamentary elections, Biedroń was elected to the Sejm as a candidate of Palikot Movement, receiving 16,919 votes in the Gdynia district. He was the first openly gay member of the Sejm. He has been a victim of homophobic aggression, having been attacked physically several times since his election.

=== Member of the Sejm (2011–2014) ===
During his term as a member of the Sejm, Biedroń served as vice-president of the Committee on Legal Affairs and Human Rights and member of the Committee on Foreign Affairs.

In addition to his parliamentary work, Biedroń was a member of the Polish delegation to the Parliamentary Assembly of the Council of Europe from 2012 to 2015.

=== Mayor of Słupsk (2014–2018) ===
Biedroń ran in the mayoral elections in Słupsk in 2014, a city of around 95,000 inhabitants located in the Pomeranian Voivodeship. He secured 57% of the vote in the second round. He thus became the first openly gay mayor ever in Poland.

Once elected mayor of Słupsk, Biedroń pursued an austerity policy. Indeed, the city was heavily indebted, with a total debt of 300 million złotys, when he took up office. He decided for instance to waive his official car, he requested to the City Council to lower his wage and he closed several local agencies. In 2017, the total debt of Słupsk decreased to 232 million złotys.

During his term, Biedroń carried out a pro-ecological, egalitarian policy with some elements of participatory democracy. The city realized the thermo-modernisation of public buildings. The mayor initiated the « Red Couch » – a red couch was placed in public areas to talk with the constituents. He has also created some consultative bodies, such as the Sustainable Development Council, the Women's Council and the Seniors' Council. He refused to host a circus with wild animals and opened a new animal shelter in Słupsk.

As mayor, Biedroń belonged to the Congress of Local and Regional Authorities of the Council of Europe from 2015 to 2018. Besides this, he was a member of the Advisory Group on Gender, Forced Displacement and Protection created by the United Nations High Commissioner for Refugees (UNHCR).

Biedroń did not run again in the mayoral elections in 2018, but he supported his deputy mayor Krystyna Danilecka-Wojewódzka.

== Leadership of Spring (2019–present) ==
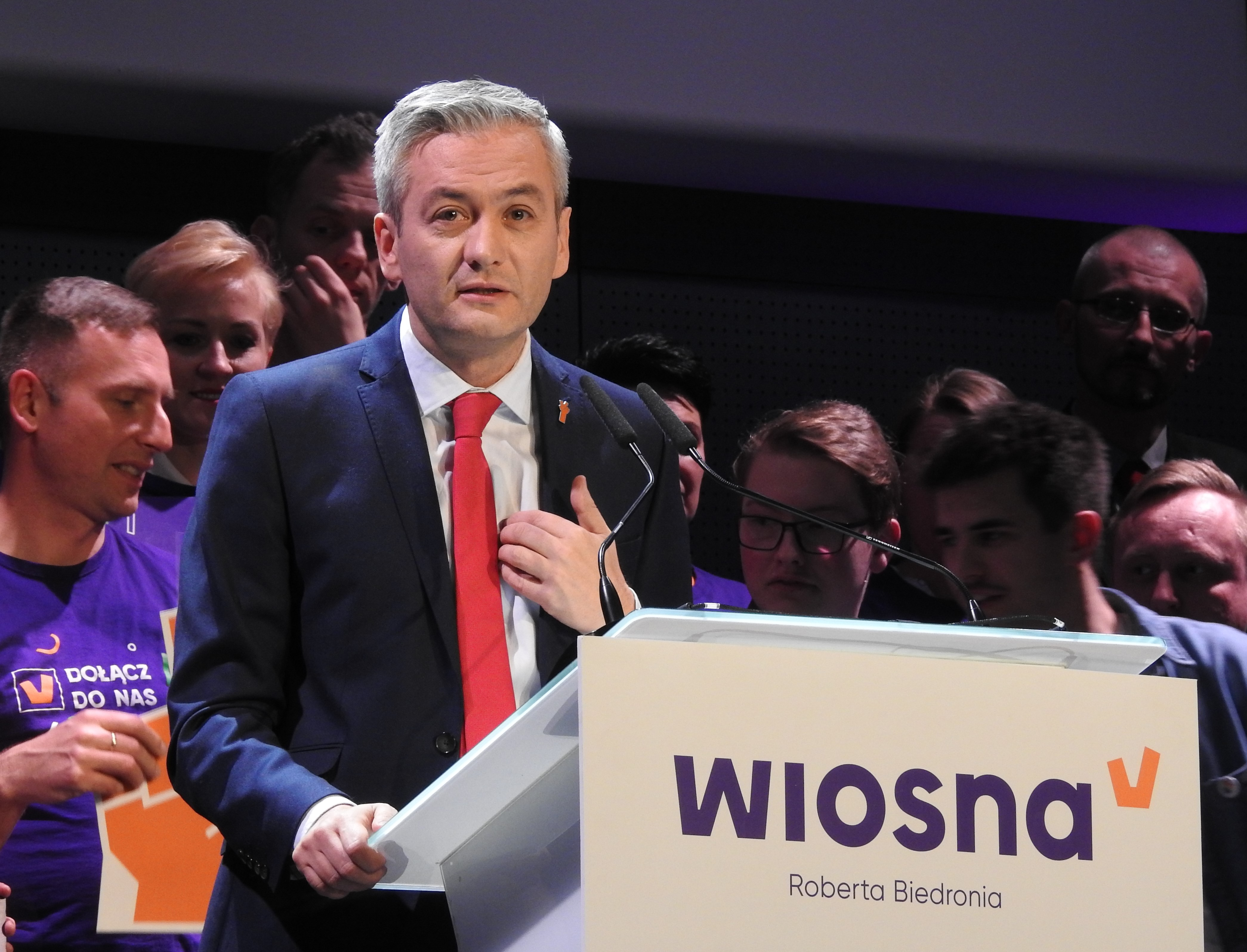
Robert Biedroń during the Spring party election convention, 2019

On 4 September 2018, Biedroń launched what he termed a "pro-democratic" political movement aimed at challenging the ruling Law and Justice party. He then launched the "Brainstormings with Biedroń", a series of events aimed at discussing about the future of Poland. Each "Brainstorming" was conducted by Biedroń and attracted hundreds, sometimes thousands, of people.

In December, he announced the first goals of his yet unnamed party: shutting down all coal mines in Poland by 2035, improving the health care system and ending state subsidies to the church.

In February 2019, Biedroń founded a new political party called Spring (Polish: Wiosna), He intends to build an alternative to the conservative Law and Justice vs. liberal Civic Platform political duopoly. Spring won 6,1% of the votes in the European elections and Robert Biedroń was elected a Member of the European Parliament on his party's list on 26 May 2019.

Before the parliamentary election in October 2019, he co-founded The Left (Lewica), a political alliance composed of the Democratic Left Alliance (SLD), Spring and the Left Together (Lewica Razem). He is one of The Left's three leaders. In January 2020 Robert Biedron was chosen by this alliance as the candidate or the left for the 2020 présidential election. The election was planned for 10 May 2020, but was postponed.

=== Member of European Parliament (2019–present) ===
Once elected to the European Parliament, he has since been serving on the Committee on Budgets and the Committee on Women's Rights and Gender Equality. He chairs the delegation for relations with Belarus and is a member of the delegation for relations with Canada. He belongs to the group of the Progressive Alliance of Socialists and Democrats (S&D).

Biedroń is currently the Chair of the Committee on Women’s Rights and Gender Equality (FEMM)

In June 2023, Biedroń was the recipient of the Diversity, Inclusion and Social Impact Award at The Parliament Magazine's annual MEP Awards

=== 2020 presidential election ===
In January 2020, his candidacy received the support of the Democratic Left Alliance, Left Together and Spring, which jointly issued him in the presidential election in the same year. He was also supported by the Polish Socialist Party.

== Political positions ==
After the Constitutional Tribunal ruled in 2020 that abortions in cases of foetal defects are unconstitutional, Biedroń called on the European Commission to "widen the scope" of Article 7 of the Treaty on European Union — which at present is limited to concerns over the judiciary — to women's rights.

== Personal life ==
Biedroń's life partner is Krzysztof Śmiszek, member of the Sejm, doctor of law, activist in the Campaign Against Homophobia and board chairman of the Polish Society of Anti-Discrimination Law. On 27 September 2023 they married in an informal, non-legally binding ceremony, as Poland does not legally recognize same-sex marriage.

He is an atheist.

In 2000, he was accused by his mother, Helena Biedroń, of abusing her and his younger brother. The case was brought to the prosecutor's office and to court. The prosecutor's office submitted an indictment to the court against Robert Biedroń, accusing him of the crime of abuse and the crime of minor bodily injury. However, Helena Biedroń withdrew the accusation, as a result of which the case was discontinued by the prosecutor's office. (Note: In 2000, Helena Biedroń accused her son Robert Biedroń of abusing his younger brother and herself. The prosecutor's office then brought charges against Robert Biedroń under Art. 157 and art. 207 of the Penal Code regarding causing damage to health and abuse of the mother and brother. During the trial, an agreement was reached. The case was conditionally discontinued. These events became the subject of public debate after a series of media publications in April 2019. In response to these publications, Helena and Robert Biedroń stated in a joint statement: "There have never been any acts of violence between us. (...) The only perpetrator of violence in our home was our husband and father. (...) The past of our family home was a nightmare for us. We would like to leave these terrible experiences and memories behind us, which cost us and our entire family years of suffering. (...) It was a dramatic time for us, our home often resembled hell, due to a violent father who abused alcohol and regularly abused us mentally and physically. The authors of the statement added that the entire family was repeatedly forced to hide the behavior of the father of the family, Zdzisław Biedroń, from other people, and "in extreme cases also from law enforcement agencies", as they explained: "We did it out of fear. This was also the case in question, when he forced us to give false testimony. Only people who have experienced domestic violence can understand this." Helena and Robert Biedroń also appealed to journalists, politicians and other people to respect their privacy. Read more: "19 lat temu prokuratura postawiła zarzuty Robertowi Biedroniowi". onet.pl. 18 April 2019. "Biedroń: Nigdy nie doszło do aktów przemocy między mną a matką". gazetaprawna.pl. 18 April 2019. "Helena i Robert Biedroń w "Faktach po Faktach". Cała rozmowa". tvn24.pl. 18 April 2019.)

== In popular culture ==
Biedroń is the subject of a documentary by Paul Szynol called Biedroń: Unfinished. The film was cut as a short because Biedroń backed out of the project for fear that it would hurt him politically.

== Awards ==
The Rainbow Laurel (2000)

The title of 'Rainbow Man' (2004)

Distinction in the ranking of the 10 best MPs of the weekly magazine Polityka conducted among Polish parliamentary journalists for diligence, culture and contribution to the work of the Justice Committee

Radio Tok FM's Anna Laszuk Award (2015).

Women's Congress Diversity Award (2016)

Ranked 8th in the ranking of best city mayors by Newsweek (2016)

Biedroń received the French National Order of Merit (July 20, 2016)

13th place in the ranking of the best city mayors by Newsweek (2017)

Special Equality Crown Award presented by the Campaign Against Homophobia (2021)

Alan Turing LGBTIQ+ Awards Premio Especial awarded by the Culture Business Pride festival for fighting for LGBTIQ+ people, their rights and visibility (2022)

The Parliament MEP Award in the Diversity, Inclusion and Social Impact category for the contribution and achievements in promoting diversity and inclusion across Europe (June 27, 2023)
