= Spring (political party) =

Political party in Poland

Spring Wiosna
- Leader: Robert Biedroń
- General Secretary: Krzysztof Gawkowski
- Founder: Robert Biedroń
- Founded: 3 February 2019; 7 years ago
- Dissolved: 11 June 2021; 5 years ago
- Split from: Your Movement; Democratic Left Alliance (minor)
- Merged into: New Left
- Headquarters: Warsaw
- Youth wing: Młoda Lewica (Young Left)
- LGBT wing: Tęczowa Wiosna (Rainbow Spring)
- Women's wing: Wiosna Kobiet (Women's Spring)
- Ideology: Social liberalism Libertarianism; Green politics Pro-Europeanism; Anti-clericalism
- Political position: Centre to centre-left
- National affiliation: The Left
- European Parliament group: Progressive Alliance of Socialists and Democrats
- Colors: Purple; Orange
- Slogan: We are the Spring!
- Anthem: Piosenka Wiosny (Song of Spring)

Website
- wiosnabiedronia.pl

Spring (Polish: Wiosna) was a social liberal and pro-European political party in Poland led by a former mayor of Słupsk, Robert Biedroń. It merged with Democratic Left Alliance and created New Left.

== History ==
The party was founded on 3 February 2019 in Hala Torwar and ran in the 2019 European elections, winning three seats.

For the 2019 parliamentary election, the party formed a coalition with the Democratic Left Alliance and Razem, known as The Left, winning 19 seats in the Sejm.

The party was set to merge with the Democratic Left Alliance (SLD) into a unitary party called the New Left in 2021. On 11 June 2021, the party's general assembly voted in favour of dissolving the party in order to merge with the SLD. The merger was finished on 9 October 2021 via a unification congress.

== Ideology ==
=== Platform ===
The core ideology of the party revolved around issues such as women’s rights, equality, creating a better community, bringing the European Union closer to the citizens, civic participation, increasing green politics and animal rights, rights of disabled people, innovative education, better public transport, better healthcare and establishment of the Justice and Reconciliation Commission. It was described as a libertarian party, and postulated abolition of religious education, permissive abortion laws, and green energy policies.

On world view issues, Spring took a liberal stance by proposing to introduce civil partnerships for opposite-sex and same-sex couples as well as the legalisation of same-sex marriage and abortion up to 12 weeks of pregnancy, along with state-funded IVF, total separation of church and state, and abolition of the so-called Church Fund. In a TV interview for TVN24, Biedroń stated that the cost of his party's programme will be 35 billion PLN.

On the environment, the party leader Biedroń proposed fighting smog by closing all mines by 2035, departing from coal and switching to renewable sources of energy. He also postulated protection of animal rights and called for the creation of an office of the Advocate of Natural Rights. The party proposed to introduce obligatory anti-violence education and sex education in all types of schools, as well as doubling the number of hours during which English is taught in schools. Furthermore, the party wanted to remove religious education classes from schools. Spring demanded the deglomeration of civil servant offices from Warsaw to other smaller cities.

== Election results ==
=== Presidential ===
Election	Candidate	1st round		2nd round	
Election	Candidate	Votes	%	Votes	%
2020	Robert Biedroń	432,129	2.2 (#6)		

=== Sejm ===
Election	Votes	%	Seats	+/–	Government
2019	2,319,946	12.6 (#3)	15 / 460	New	Opposition
2019	As part of Democratic Left Alliance, which won 49 seats in total.				

=== European Parliament ===
Election	Votes	%	Seats	+/–	EP Group
2019	826,975	6.1 (#3)	3 / 52	New	S&D
