= 2005 Polish People's Party leadership election =

- 29 January 2005
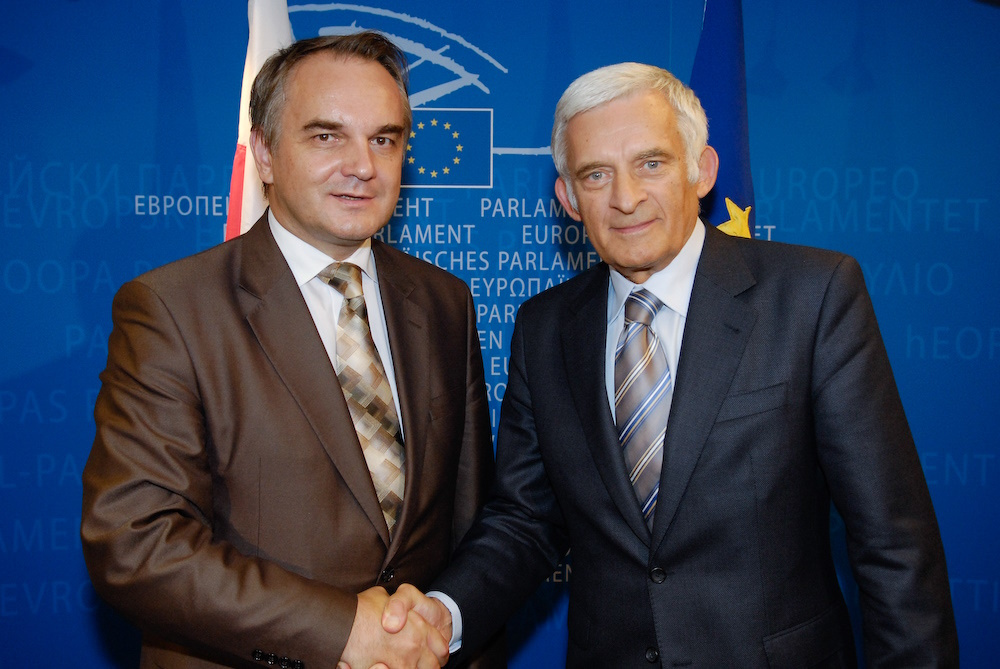

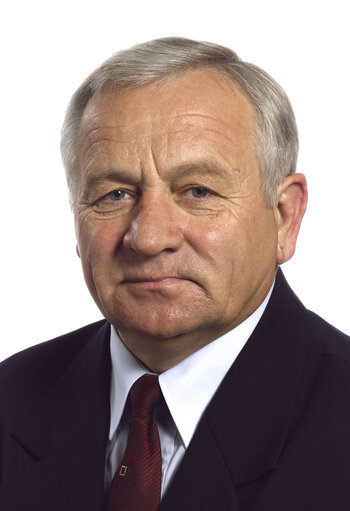
Candidate	Waldemar Pawlak	Zdzisław Podkański
Popular vote	51	21
Percentage	70.83%	29.17%
2nd vote (Note: In the election for party chairman, Pawlak defeated Podkański, but did not reach the required absolute majority of 52 votes to win. A second vote was held following the election deciding simply whether to elect Pawlak as party chairman.)	60
Percentage	84.51% (Note: In the second vote, 11 votes were cast "against" Pawlak as party chairman.)
Chairman before election
Janusz Wojciechowski
Elected Chairman
Waldemar Pawlak

The 2005 Polish People's Party leadership election was held on 29 January 2005. Waldemar Pawlak was elected as the leader of the party by the Supreme Council after it accepted the resignation of Janusz Wojciechowski. The election took place at a meeting of the Supreme Council of the Polish People's Party, with the decisive issue becoming the fate of a proposed electoral alliance, "Zgoda". The rejection of "Zgoda" by the Supreme Council led to the resignation of Wojciechowski, sparking an election for party chairman. Pawlak, an opponent of "Zgoda", faced a supporter of the proposed alliance, Zdzisław Podkański, defeating him with 70.8% of the vote. Due to not meeting the required absolute majority of 52 votes, Pawlak's victory came on a second vote, where he was the only candidate. Pawlak became the first party chairman of PSL to serve nonconsecutive terms, previously being chairman in 1991—1997.

== Background ==
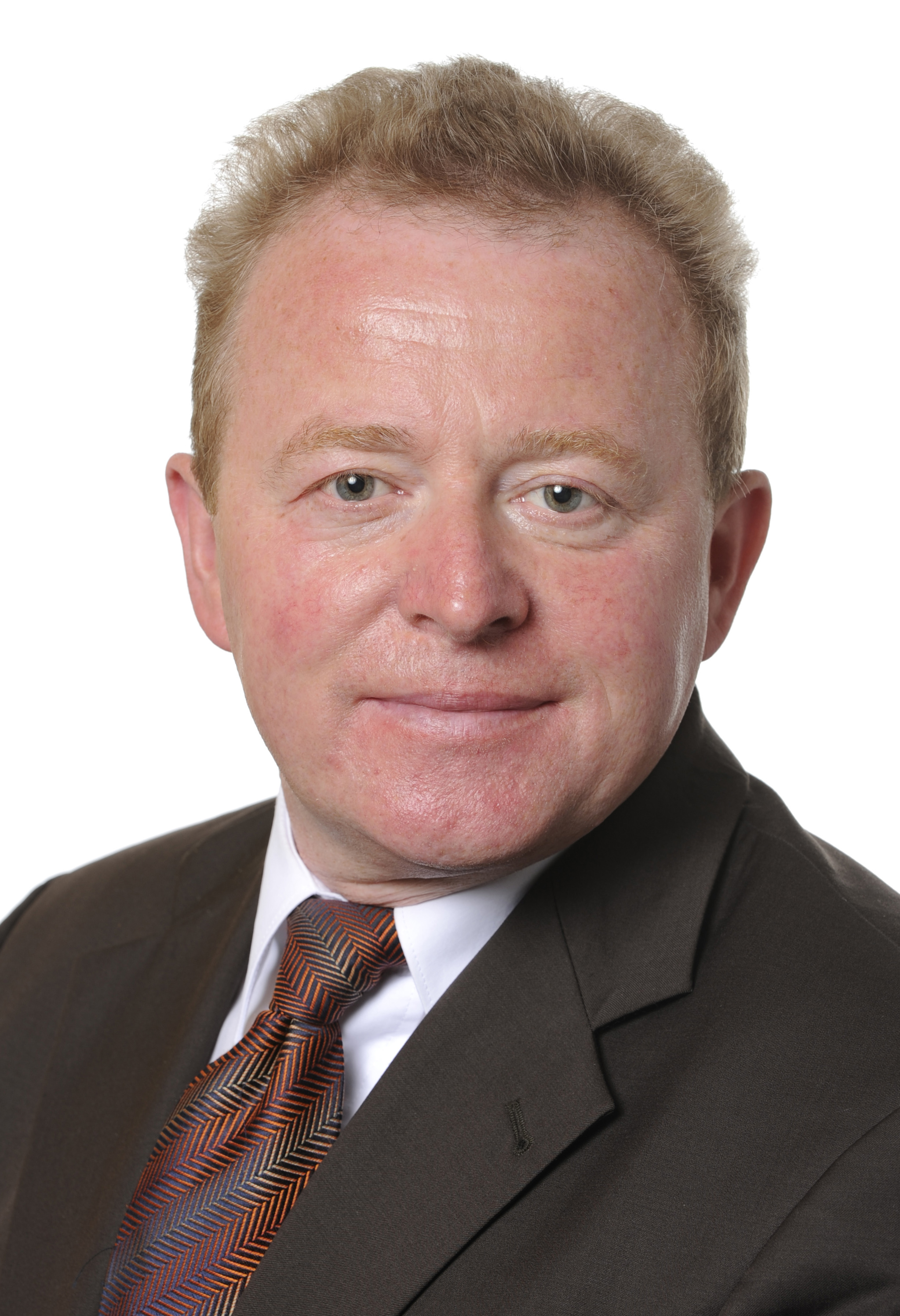
Janusz Wojciechowski, outgoing party chairman

In 2004, the Polish People's Party (PSL) narrowly decided to elect Janusz Wojciechowski over Janusz Piechociński at the 8th Polish People's Party Congress in Warsaw. The second part of the 8th Congress accepted a resolution seeking to establish talks with "other characteristically Christian-People's" parties, possibly establishing a new political formation.

Wojciechowski began talks to establish an electoral alliance, "Zgoda" (lit. 'Agreement'), with Zbigniew Religa's Centre Party and Jerzy Kropiwnicki's Christian National Union. However, the idea of an electoral alliance with the two parties became unpopular with many in the party leadership. Supporters of the alliance — Janusz Wojciechowski, Zbigniew Kuźmiuk, Zdzisław Podkański, Sławomir Juszczyk — and its opponents — Jarosław Kalinowski, Marek Sawicki, Waldemar Pawlak, and regional leaders Eugeniusz Kłopotek, Jan Bury, Stanisław Żelichowski, Wiesław Woda — ultimately confronted with a vote on the issue on a 29 January 2005 meeting of the Supreme Council of PSL. Opponents of "Zgoda", seeking to contest the election alone, emerged victorious with 52 votes at the meeting, and 29 votes of support for the alliance. Following the vote, Janusz Wojciechowski announced his resignation as party chairman, causing a leadership election.

== Candidates ==
Candidate	Born	Political office
Waldemar Pawlak	5 September 1959; Model, Poland	Member of the Sejm (1989–2015); Prime Minister of Poland (1992, 1993–1995); Leader of the Polish People's Party (1991–1997)
Zdzisław Podkański	18 October 1949; Guzówka, Poland	Member of the European Parliament (2004–2009); Member of the Sejm (1993–2004); Minister of Culture and Art (1996–1997)

=== Withdrawn candidates ===
Candidate	Born	Political office
Jan Bury	1 October 1963; Przeworsk, Poland	Member of the Sejm (1991–1997, 2001–2015); Member of the Subcarpathian Voivodeship Sejmik (1998–2001)
Alfred Domagalski	1 January 1945; Kielce, Poland	Member of the Sejm (1993–1997)
Janusz Piechociński	15 March 1960; Studzianki, Poland	Member of the Sejm (1991–1997, 2001–2005)

== Election ==
On the first vote regarding his resignation, the majority of the Supreme Council of the PSL voted in favor of accepting Wojciechowski's resignation, with 48 voting for and 31 voting against. However, as the required amount of votes to accept a decision was 52, an absolute majority, the party failed to accept the resignation. Wojciechowski called a second resignation vote, stating that "[he could not] take responsibility for PSL if the party has not adopted [his] political plan", asking for the party to accept his resignation and elect a new party leader. The Supreme Council accepted Wojciechowski's second resignation with 53 votes, one more than the necessary 52.

Following Wojciechowski's resignation, five candidates registered for the election: Jan Bury, Alfred Domagalski, Waldemar Pawlak, Janusz Piechociński and Zdzisław Podkański. However, three of the five candidates withdrew prior to the vote, with only Pawlak and Podkański remaining. Bury and Piechociński endorsed Pawlak. In the vote for new party chairman, Pawlak decisively defeated Podkański, with 51 votes (70.8%). However, as he lacked the 52 votes necessary to be elected with an absolute majority, he did not get elected. A second vote was ordered with only Pawlak on the ballot, where Podkański called for his supporters to vote for Pawlak to "save the PSL". On the single-candidate vote, Pawlak was elected as party chairman with 60 votes, with 11 votes against him, becoming the first PSL party chairman to serve nonconsecutive terms.

== Results ==
=== Wojciechowski resignation ===
First resignation vote
Candidate	Vote	%
For resignation	48	60.76
Against resignation ✓	31	39.24
Total	79	?
Abstain	?	?
Blank/Invalid	?	?
Total votes	?	100.00
Source: Wprost

Since the vote to accept the resignation fell under the required absolute majority of 52, Wojciechowski's first resignation was rejected.

Second resignation vote
Candidate	Vote	%
For resignation ✓	53	70.67
Against resignation	22	29.33
Total	75	?
Abstain	?	?
Blank/Invalid	?	?
Total votes	?	100.00
Source: Wprost

=== Party chairman ===
Election for party chairman
Candidate	Vote	%
Waldemar Pawlak	51	70.83
Zdzisław Podkański	21	29.17
Total	72	?
Abstain	?	?
Blank/Invalid	?	?
Total votes	?	100.00
Source: ppr.pl

Since neither candidate received the required absolute majority of 52 votes, a vote to accept Pawlak as party chairman with only him as a candidate was held.

Vote to accept Pawlak as party chairman
Candidate	Vote	%
Waldemar Pawlak ✓	60	84.51
Against	11	15.49
Total	71	?
Abstain	?	?
Blank/Invalid	?	?
Total votes	?	100.00
Source: Wprost

== Aftermath ==
Following the election, three deputy chairmen of PSL resigned from their posts: Zbigniew Kuźmiuk, Zdzisław Podkański and Sławomir Juszczyk. They were replaced by Janusz Piechociński, Jan Bury and Witold Perka. Janusz Piechociński would challenge Pawlak's leadership in 2012. He narrowly defeated Pawlak, becoming the new party chairman.

PSL emerged with 6.96% of the vote in the upcoming parliamentary election, a decrease of 2.02 pp since 2001. After the election, the party voted for the minority Law and Justice Marcinkiewicz cabinet. In that year's presidential election, it fielded Jarosław Kalinowski as its presidential nominee, who received 1.80% of the vote. After 2007, it governed together with the Civic Platform until the return of Law and Justice to power in 2015.

Wojciechowski, Kuźmiuk and Podkański were removed from PSL in February 2006 after affiliating with the Union for Europe of the Nations without approval of party leadership. Afterwards, they formed the Polish People's Party "Piast", which largely cooperated with Law and Justice.
