= Zgoda (electoral alliance) =

- Leaders: Janusz Wojciechowski; Zbigniew Religa; Jerzy Kropiwnicki
- Founded: 22 January 2005
- Dissolved: 29 January 2005
- Ideology: Christian democracy Agrarianism
- Political position: Centre-right
- Members: Polish People's Party; Centre Party; Christian National Union
- Colours: Green (PSL); Blue (PC); Blue (ZChN)

Zgoda (lit. 'Agreement') was a short-lived centre-right electoral alliance signed on 22 January 2005 in Łódź by the leaders of three Polish political parties — Janusz Wojciechowski of the Polish People's Party, Zbigniew Religa of the Centre Party, and Jerzy Kropiwnicki of the Christian National Union. Ultimately, the alliance failed to materialize as it was met with opposition by the majority of the Centre Party and the Polish People's Party. The Supreme Council of the Polish People's Party voted against the agreement, prompting Wojciechowski to resign as the party's leader on 29 January; he was also expelled from the party in early 2006.

== History ==
In 2005, both a parliamentary election as well as a presidential election were to take place in Poland. This prompted all political parties, especially minor ones, to seek alliances and coalitions. At the time, the Polish People's Party (PSL) was rocked by an internal conflict between its left wing represented by Jarosław Kalinowski and associated with the communist United People's Party that the PSL originated from, and the right wing represented by Janusz Wojciechowski, who was elected party leader in the 2004 Polish People's Party leadership election.

Initially, the PSL was interested in the concept of the "National-Agrarian Bloc" that was to be a coalition of the far-left Self-Defence of the Republic of Poland, the Polish People's Party, and the far-right League of Polish Families. Wojciechowski was preemptively supportive of this idea. However, Wojciechowski was also approached by Jerzy Kropiwnicki, the leader of the Christian National Union, who offered Wojciechowski a centre-right alliance that would move PSL "away from the role of a satellite to the SLD [post-communist social-democratic party]" and instead build "the Polish wing of European Christian democracy".

Kropiwnicki's concept was based on forming a coalition of PSL, his party, and the tiny Centre Party which was founded in 2004. Centre Party, despite being recently founded and having very few members, included in its ranks former ministers of Jerzy Buzek government, such as Janusz Steinhoff, and Artur Balazs. The party was also led by Zbigniew Religa, who was considered popular enough to have a chance at winning the presidential election. Religa agreed to form an alliance. Wojciechowski, who wanted to pursue agreements with right-leaning parties in order to undermine the post-communist left wing of the PSL, also supported the idea. Wojciechowski connected the alliance to his larger plan of programmatically shifting the PSL; on the initiative of the party's MEPs, a conference named “The Evolution of Peasant and Agrarian Parties Towards a Christian Democratic Party in Europe” was held on 20 December 2004, which introduced the model of transforming PSL into a centre-right agrarian party. PSL was become a Christian-democratic party that would work with centre-right parties. Wojciechowski stated that under his leadership, the PSL "began to distance itself from its firmly leftist image and shifted very significantly towards the centre".

On 22 January 2005, in Łódź, Wojciechowski, Kropiwnicki and Religa signed a declaration that their parties would form a joint electoral committee Zgoda, which was to symbolise “state, national, and social sensitivity” and which would strive towards a “citizen-friendly, just and sovereign” Polish state that would grant citizens real influence on political affairs instead of reducing them to an "electoral mass". Zgoda was also to follow the social teaching of Saint John Paul II. The agreement also included a nomination of Religa as a joint presidential candidate for the 2005 election.

The declaration was widely publicised in the media, and caused an uproar in the PSL. Rank-and-file party members saw the agreement as a private initiative of the party leader that was not consulted with the party and large and which would require the approval of the party's Supreme Council. Council's debates soon became a showdown between the supporters and opponents of Wojciechowski within the party. Kalinowski stated his strong opposition to the agreement, arguing that it would be dishonest towards the voters and that PSL and Religa are too far ideologically from Religa, citing Religa's support for the European Constitution and privatization of healthcare, both opposed by the PSL. Wojciechowski stated that he would consider resigning as party's leader should the plan fail to gain the Supreme Council's approval.

Wojciechowski was criticized for signing the agreement before consulting the Supreme Council, placing party members before a fait accompli that they had no say in. Many PSL members also argued that the agreement was a mistake as PSL is a 110-year old party and should run under its own banner. Wojciechowski's idea was supported by the party's vice-presidents Zbigniew Kuźmiuk, Zdzisław Podkański and Sławomir Juszczyk, while those opposed, apart from Kalinowski, were Marek Sawicki, Eugeniusz Kłopotek, Jan Bury, Stanisław Żelichowski, and Wiesław Woda. The head of the PSL parliementary group, Waldemar Pawlak, also opposed the agreement. On 29 January, the Supreme Council strongly rejected the agreement, with 29 votes in favor and 52 votes against it. This entailed the dissolution of the alliance.

=== Aftermath ===
Immediately after the alliance was voted down, Wojciechowski submitted his resignation as leader of the PSL. However, the Supreme Council did not accept his resignation, with 48 votes for accepting it and 31 against, falling short of the absolute majority of 52 votes that was required. Wojciechowski then submitted his resignation again, which was accepted with 53 votes for and 22 against. The party's vice-presidens followed Wojciechowski in his resignation. Kalinowski's resignation prompted the 2005 Polish People's Party leadership election from which Waldemar Pawlak emerged victorious after two ballots. Under this leadership, PSL entered talks with the League of Polish Families and Law and Justice instead.

Given PSL's withdrawal from the agreement, Kropiwnicki and Religa pursued an alternative alliance with other parties; Religa became the presidential candidate of the Christian National Union, Alliance of Democrats, and the Pensioners’ Forum. While polls showed massive support for Religa in early 2005, by July and August, his support fell by 20 percentage points. In face of this, Religa withdrew his candidacy and endorsed Donald Tusk of the Civic Platform in a press conference on 2 September 2005. Religa also became the head of the Civic Platform's honorary election committee. Left alone, Kropiwnicki and his party endorsed Lech Kaczyński of Law and Justice and ran on the electoral list of Kaczyński's party in the parliamentary election later that year. After Law and Justice won the 2005 parliamentary election, Kropiwnicki stated his satisfaction with embracing it, and the Christian National Union fully merged into Law and Justice in 2007.

After the collapse of Zgoda, PSL faced financial hardship and only polled 4–7% nationwide. The Christian National Union denounced PSL for rejecting the agreement, arguing that the communist United People's Party wing had taken over the party and that PSL would "therefore remain a union of wealthy and moderately well-off farmers" instead of expanding its appeal. On 13 December 2005, Kuźmiuk, Podkański, and Wojciechowski, who were MEPs, left the European People's Party Group with which PSL was associated with and joined the Union for Europe of the Nations. Because of this, they were expelled from the PSL on 3 February 2006.

== Ideology ==
Zgoda was described as centre-right and was to have a "centre-right structure and ideology". It was to be "state-wise, nationally, and socially" sensitive, and its goal was described as establishing a “citizen-friendly, just and sovereign” Polish state that would grant citizens real influence on political affairs instead of reducing them to an "electoral mass". Zgoda was also to follow the social teaching of Saint John Paul II. The agreement also included a nomination of Religa as a joint presidential candidate for the 2005 election. The electoral list of the alliance were to be jointly decided by the three signatories of it.

The alliance was also described as Christian-democratic and agrarian, and was expected to have between 16 and 18% approval in the polls. While initially limited to three parties, it was planned to be expand in order to include all "patriotic, Christian, agrarian and nationalist" parties under one banner. It was planned that Zgoda would eventually centralize into a political party, which was to be named the "Centre Party", and would not only unite the three parties of the alliance's signatories together, but also the Conservative People's Party. The alliance was part of Wojciechowski's greater plan of shifting PSL towards the right.

== See also ==
- Lithuanian Farmers, Greens and Christian Families Union
- League and Self-Defense
- Social Alliance (Poland)
