= List of members of the European Parliament for Poland, 2019–2024 =

This is a list of the 52 members of the European Parliament for Poland in the 2019 to 2024 session.

These MEPs were elected at the 2019 European Parliament election in Poland.

== List ==
Key to political association by:
List: (Note: Electoral list of the MEP in the election in 2019.)
- Law and Justice (PiS)
- European Coalition (KE)
- Spring
Party: (Note: Political party membership of the MEP at the end of the term or at MEP's departure.)
- Law and Justice (PiS)
- Civic Platform (PO)
- New Left (NL)
- Sovereign Poland (SP)
- Polish People's Party (PSL)
- Poland 2050 (PL2050)
- The Greens (Z)
- Independents (Ind.)
Group: (Note: European Parliament political group affiliation of the MEP at the end of the term or at MEP's departure.)
- European Conservatives and Reformists (ECR)
- European People's Party Group (EPP)
- Progressive Alliance of Socialists and Democrats (S&D)
- Renew Europe (Renew)
- Greens–European Free Alliance (G-EFA)

Constituency	List	Name	Party	Group	# of votes	% of votes (Note: Percentage of votes in the scale of the constituency cast for the MEP.)
Pomeranian	KE	Janusz Lewandowski	PO	EPP	120,990	14.62
Pomeranian	KE	Magdalena Adamowicz	Ind.	EPP	199,591	24.12
Pomeranian	PiS	Anna Fotyga	PiS	ECR	160,517	19.40
Kuyavian-Pomeranian	KE	Krzysztof Brejza; Since 3 January 2024	PO	EPP	84,225	12.69
Kuyavian-Pomeranian	PiS	Kosma Złotowski	PiS	ECR	107,113	16.14
Podlaskie and Warmian-Masurian	KE	Tomasz Frankowski	PO	EPP	125,845	15.87
Podlaskie and Warmian-Masurian	PiS	Karol Karski	PiS	ECR	184,054	23.21
Podlaskie and Warmian-Masurian	PiS	Krzysztof Jurgiel	PiS	ECR	104,592	13.19
Warsaw	Spring	Robert Biedroń	NL	S&D	96,388	6.96
Warsaw	KE	Włodzimierz Cimoszewicz	NL	S&D	219,677	15.86
Warsaw	KE	Andrzej Halicki	PO	EPP	87,422	6.31
Warsaw	KE	Danuta Hübner	PO	EPP	146,746	10.59
Warsaw	PiS	Jacek Saryusz-Wolski	PiS	ECR	186,851	13.49
Warsaw	PiS	Ryszard Czarnecki	PiS	ECR	134,629	9.72
Masovian	KE	Jarosław Kalinowski	PSL	EPP	104,216	12.25
Masovian	PiS	Adam Bielan	PiS	ECR	207,845	24.43
Masovian	PiS	Rafał Romanowski; Since 29 November 2023	PiS	ECR	11,420	1.34
Łódź	KE	Marek Belka	NL	S&D	182,517	20.00
Łódź	PiS	Witold Waszczykowski	PiS	ECR	168,021	18.41
Łódź	PiS	Joanna Kopcińska	PiS	ECR	130,358	14.28
Greater Poland	Spring	Sylwia Spurek	Z	G-EFA	55,306	4.61
Greater Poland	KE	Ewa Kopacz	PO	EPP	252,032	21.01
Greater Poland	KE	Leszek Miller	Ind.	S&D	79,380	6.62
Greater Poland	PiS	Zdzisław Krasnodębski	PiS	ECR	164,034	13.68
Greater Poland	PiS	Andżelika Możdżanowska	PiS	ECR	76,953	6.42
Lublin	KE	Włodzimierz Karpiński; Since 16 November 2023	Ind.	EPP	3,501	0.47
Lublin	PiS	Elżbieta Kruk	PiS	ECR	164,108	22.18
Lublin	PiS	Beata Mazurek	PiS	ECR	204,693	27.67
Subcarpathian	KE	Elżbieta Łukacijewska	PO	EPP	40,737	5.46
Subcarpathian	PiS	Tomasz Poręba	PiS	ECR	276,014	36.97
Subcarpathian	PiS	Bogdan Rzońca	PiS	ECR	64,113	8.59
Lesser Poland and Świętokrzyskie	KE	Róża Thun	PL2050	Renew	221,279	12.71
Lesser Poland and Świętokrzyskie	KE	Adam Jarubas	PSL	EPP	138,854	7.97
Lesser Poland and Świętokrzyskie	PiS	Beata Szydło	PiS	ECR	525,811	30.2
Lesser Poland and Świętokrzyskie	PiS	Ryszard Legutko	PiS	ECR	65,710	3.77
Lesser Poland and Świętokrzyskie	PiS	Patryk Jaki	SP	ECR	258,366	14.84
Lesser Poland and Świętokrzyskie	PiS	Dominik Tarczyński; Since 1 February 2020	PiS	ECR	41,912	2.41
Silesian	Spring	Łukasz Kohut	NL	S&D	48,783	3.05
Silesian	KE	Jerzy Buzek	PO	EPP	422,445	26.41
Silesian	KE	Marek Balt	NL	S&D	45,043	2.82
Silesian	KE	Jan Olbrycht	PO	EPP	69,009	4.31
Silesian	PiS	Jadwiga Wiśniewska	PiS	ECR	409,373	25.6
Silesian	PiS	Grzegorz Tobiszowski	PiS	ECR	65,007	4.06
Silesian	PiS	Izabela Kloc	PiS	ECR	78,352	4.90
Lower Silesian and Opole	KE	Janina Ochojska	Ind.	EPP	307,227	23.47
Lower Silesian and Opole	KE	Jarosław Duda	PO	EPP	77,611	5.93
Lower Silesian and Opole	PiS	Anna Zalewska	PiS	ECR	168,337	12.86
Lower Silesian and Opole	PiS	Beata Kempa	SP	ECR	209,305	15.99
Lubusz and West Pomeranian	KE	Bogusław Liberadzki	NL	S&D	99,897	11.36
Lubusz and West Pomeranian	KE	Witold Pahl; Since 16 November 2023	PO	EPP	6,520	0.74
Lubusz and West Pomeranian	PiS	Joachim Brudziński	PiS	ECR	185,168	21.06
Lubusz and West Pomeranian	PiS	Elżbieta Rafalska	PiS	ECR	70,916	8.07

=== Former members ===
Constituency	List	Name	Party	Group	# of votes	% of votes	Until	Reason	Replaced by
Kuyavian-Pomeranian	KE	Radosław Sikorski	PO	EPP	129,339	19.49	12 December 2023	Appointed Minister of Foreign Affairs	Krzysztof Brejza
Lubusz and West Pomeranian	KE	Bartosz Arłukowicz	PO	EPP	239,893	27.29	18 October 2023	Elected member of the Sejm	Witold Pahl
Lublin	KE	Krzysztof Hetman	PSL	EPP	105,908	14.31	18 October 2023	Elected member of the Sejm	Włodzimierz Karpiński
Masovian	PiS	Zbigniew Kuźmiuk	PiS	ECR	134,405	15.8	18 October 2023	Elected member of the Sejm	Rafał Romanowski

== See also ==
- 2019 European Parliament election in Poland
- List of members of the European Parliament, 2019–2024
