= Piecha =

Piecha is a Polish-language surname. Occasionally it may be transliterated from Russian language as Piekha.

Piecha or Piekha may refer to:

- Barbara Piecha (born 1948), Polish luger
- Bolesław Piecha (born 1954), Polish politician
- Edita Piekha (born 1937), French-born Soviet and Russian singer and actress of Polish descent
- Stas Piekha (born 1980), Russian singer and actor

== See also ==
- Piech
- Piëch
