= Initiative for Poland =

Former Polish political party

Initiative for Poland Inicjatywa dla Polski
- Leader: Aldona Kamela-Sowińska (2003–2005); Remigiusz Witkowski (2005–2006)
- Founded: 13 June 2003; 22 years ago
- Registered: 2003
- Dissolved: 29 September 2006; 19 years ago
- Headquarters: Poznań
- Youth wing: Initiative of the Young (Polish: Inicjatywa Młodych)
- Ideology: Christian democracy Privatisation
- Political position: Centre-right

The Initiative for Poland (Polish: Inicjatywa dla Polski) or IdP, was a short-lived centre-right Christian democratic Polish political party.

== History ==
The party was created in Poznań on the 14 June 2003 on the initiative of the former finance minister Aldona Kamela-Sowińska Among the first members were Andrzej Sośnierz, Zbigniew Zysk and Władysław Medwid.

For the 2004 European parliamentary elections the party had a host of famous candidates on their electoral lists, notably Barbara Borys-Damięcka (former senator and film director), Wilibald Winkler (former Silesian voivode), Andrzej Wiszniewski (former minister for education), Dorota Czudowska (former senator), Wojciech Szczęsny Kaczmarek (former mayor of Poznań), Bartłomiej Sochański (former mayor of Szczecin), Korneliusz Pacuda (journalist), Tomasz Wójtowicz (Olympian and volleyball player) and Ryszard Jankowski (former football manager). They received 88565 votes, an overall share of 1.45%.

In the autumn of 2004 there were serious talks of a merger with the Centre Party but this never materialised in the end.

In 2005 for the parliamentary elections that year the majority used Civic Platform's electoral lists whilst a minority used the Centre Party's lists.

On the 5 January 2006 at the party AGM, it was decided that the party will be dissolved. Most of the activists joined other political parties, most joined the Civic Platform. The party was officially de-registered on 29 September 2006.
