= Piech (disambiguation) =

Piech, Pięch, Piëch or variation, may refer to:

- Piech, a surname
- Piech family, a German-Austrian business family, owners of Porsche and Volkswagen
- Piëch Automotive, a Swiss car company, part of the Porsche Group
- Ferdinand Piëch (1937-2019) chairman of the Volkswagen Group, member of the Porsche-Pieche automotive business clan
