= Krzysztof Brejza =

Polish politician (born 1983)

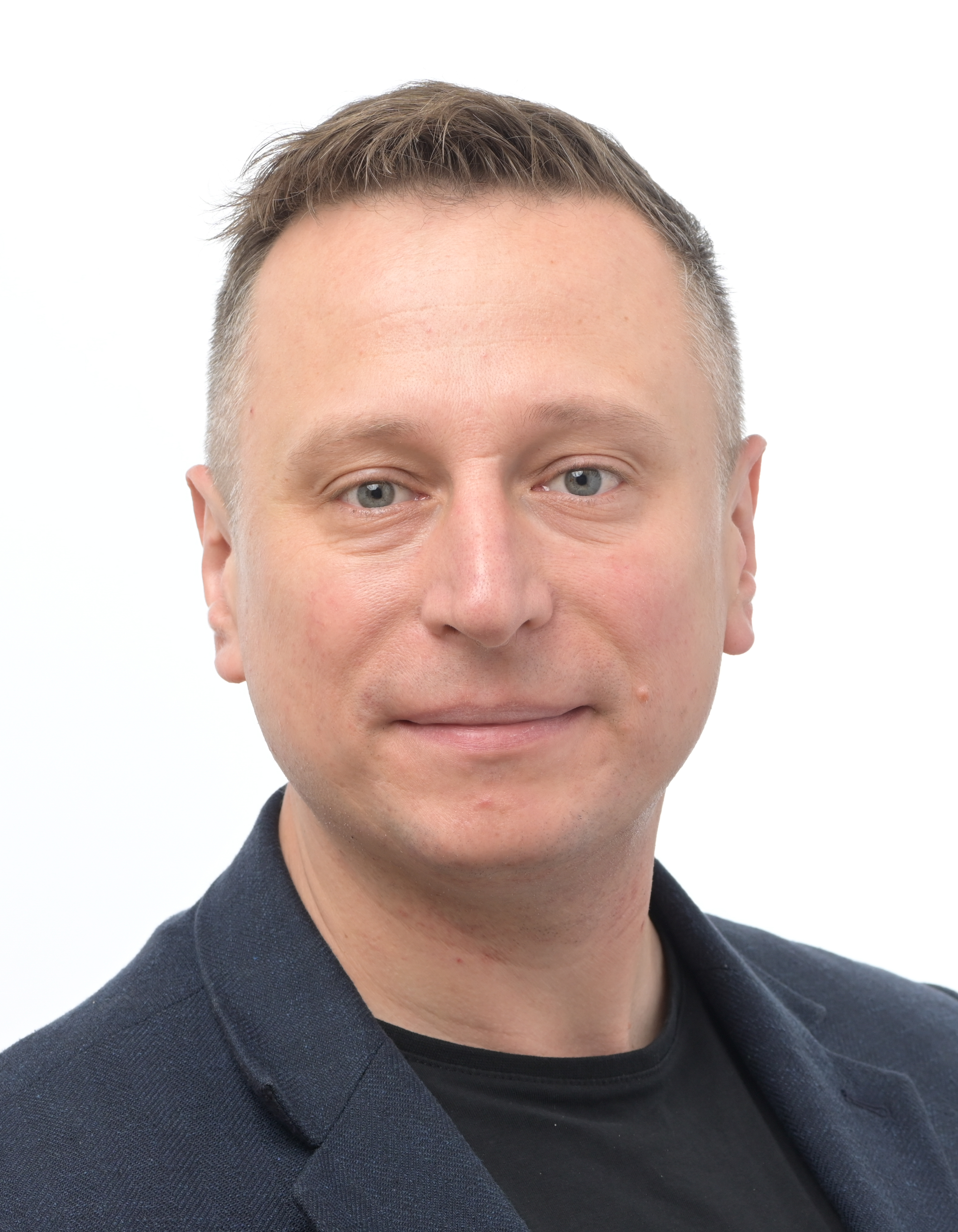

Member of the European Parliament for Poland
- Incumbent
- Assumed office 3 January 2024
- Preceded by: Radosław Sikorski

Member of the Sejm
- In office 6 November 2007 – 3 January 2024
- Constituency: 4 – Bydgoszcz

Member of Kuyavian-Pomeranian Regional Assembly from the 1st Bydgoszcz City district
- In office 2005–2006

Personal details
- Born: 16 May 1983 (age 42) Bydgoszcz, Poland
- Party: Civic Platform
- Spouse: Dorota Brejza

Krzysztof Brejza (born 16 May 1983 in Bydgoszcz, Poland) is a Polish politician, currently serving as member of the European Parliament (MEP). He was member of the Sejm of the Republic of Poland, representing the Bydgoszcz district. Between 2005 and 2006 he was a member of the Kuyavian-Pomeranian Regional Assembly.

== Career ==
Brejza is a graduate of the Law and Administration Faculty of University of Warsaw.

In the 2002 Polish local elections he was elected to the Regional Assembly representing one of the Bydgoszcz City districts. Having received 1,512 votes and coming second on the Civic Platform and Law and Justice (POPiS) list behind Maciej Świątkowski, Brejza was not initially elected. Only after Świątkowski was elected to the Sejm of the Republic of Poland (the lower house of the Polish parliament) in the 2005 parliamentary elections did Brejza take over his seat in the Regional Assembly. He served only one year, until the end of his term.

In the 2006 local elections, he ran again for the Regional Assembly. Scoring 2,874 votes in the 1st Bydgoszcz City district, he came fourth on the Civic Platform list and wasn't elected, as Civic Platform only won three seats.

In the 2007 parliamentary elections, he was elected to the Sejm of the Republic of Poland from the Civic Platform list in the 4th district (Bydgoszcz) with 6,441 votes. He was reelected in the 2015 elections with 15,951 votes.

His father Ryszard Brejza is also a politician, having been a Member of the 6th Sejm of the Polish Republic (1997–2001) and currently serving as President (Mayor) of Inowrocław, a role he has held since 2002.

On 3 January 2024, Brejza was co-opted as MEP in the ninth European Parliament, replacing Radosław Sikorski in the European People's Party Group, who was appointed as Minister of Foreign Affairs in December 2023.

=== 2019 parliamentary election campaign surveillance ===
In December 2021, the news emerged that Senator Brejza was under surveillance according to the Citizen Lab at the University of Toronto. The surveillance took place during the 2019 Polish parliamentary election campaign and involved the use of Pegasus spyware, which the Polish government-controlled secret service is unofficially in possession of. Brejza was head of the Civic Coalition election campaign at the time and it is alleged that the spying could have affected the results of the elections won by the conservative Law and Justice party leading to calls for setting up an investigation committee into the case. In January 2022, the Polish Senate passed a resolution to establish a special committee to investigate this matter.

== See also ==
- Kuyavian-Pomeranian Regional Assembly
- Bydgoszcz's parliamentary district
- List of members of the European Parliament for Poland, 2019–2024
