= Andrzej Person =

Polish politician

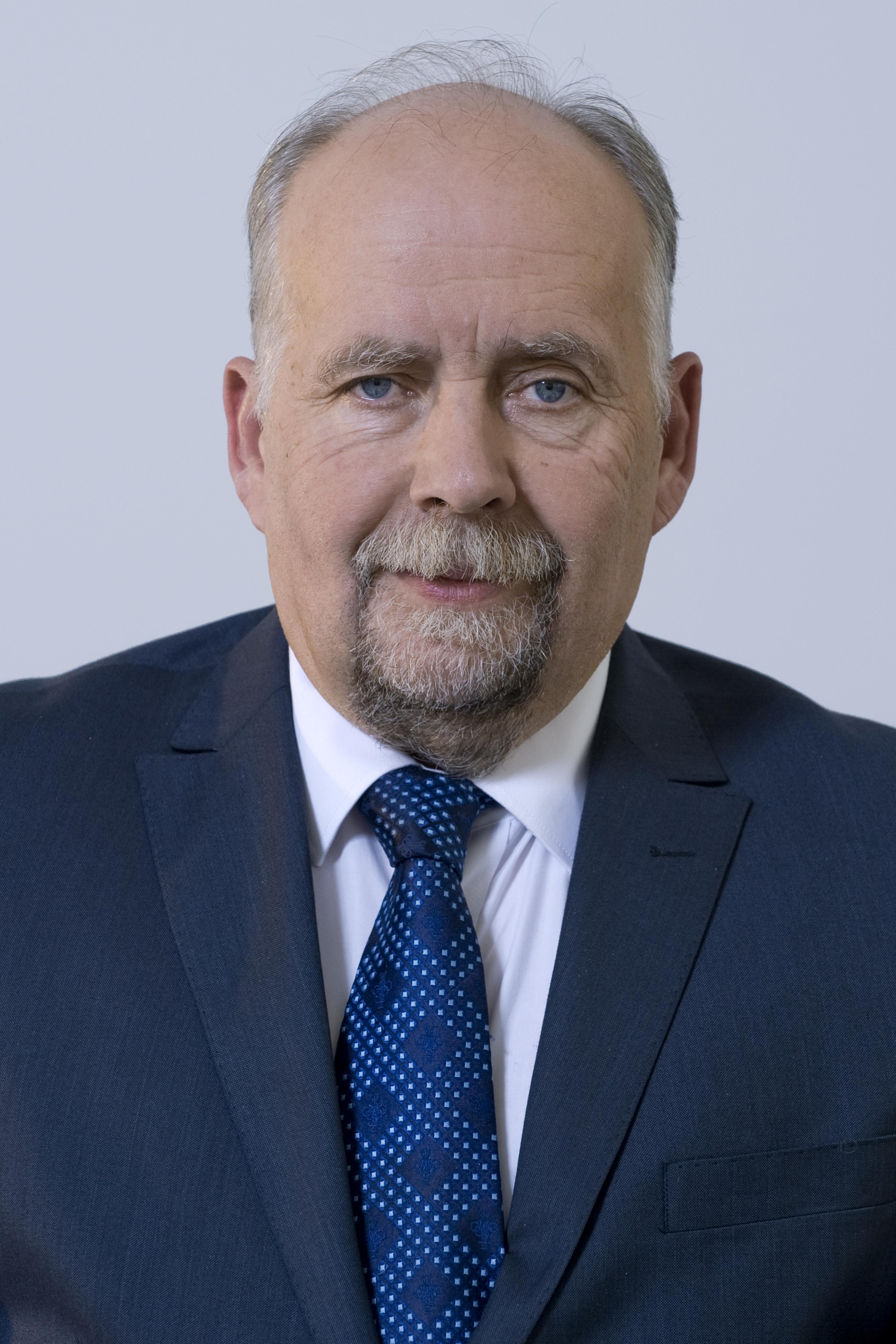

Member of the Senate
- In office 2005 – 2015
- Constituency: 13 Włocławek (after 2011); 5 Toruń (until 2011)

Personal details
- Born: 14 May 1951 (age 74) Włocławek, Poland
- Political party: Civic Platform

Andrzej Person (born 14 May 1951) is a Polish politician and former senator, representing Civic Platform in the VI, VII and VIII Senate terms.
