= New Democracy (Poland) =

Polish social-democratic party active 1995–1997

New Democracy (Polish: Nowa Demokracja, ND) was a social-democratic and liberal Polish political party and parliamentary circle in the 2nd term Sejm.

The party was registered on 28 March 1995 as the 273th party. It was represented in the Sejm by posełs removed from the Labour Union in December 1994 - Sławomir Nowakowski, Eugeniusz Januła, Jan Zaborowski and, for a time, Zbigniew Zysk. The party joined the Democratic Left Alliance, but failed to win any seats in the 1997 parliamentary election. It again registered in 1997, but soon stopped functioning and was crossed out of the party registry. It consisted of 1,200 members, primarily oriented around Warsaw and Upper and Lower Silesia.
