= Rafał Romanowski =

Polish politician (born 1978)

Rafał Romanowski MEP
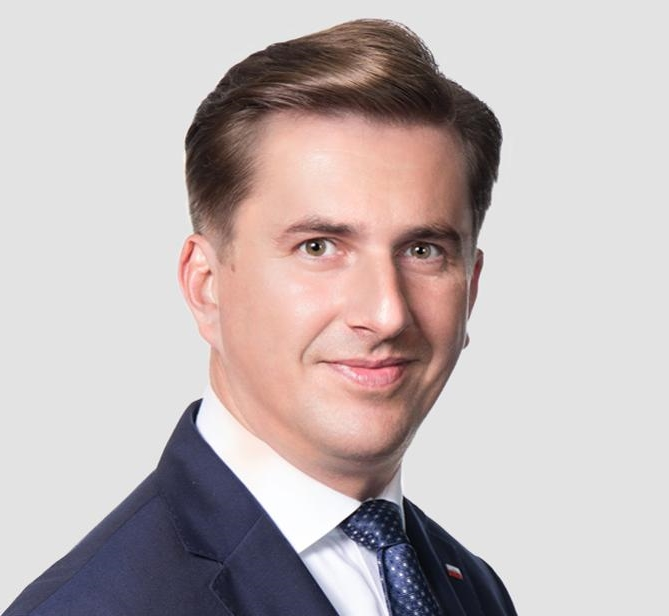
- Rafał Romanowski in 2019

Member of the European Parliament for Masovian
- Incumbent
- Assumed office 29 November 2023
- Preceded by: Zbigniew Kuźmiuk

Personal details
- Born: 15 February 1978 (age 48) Ciechanów, Poland
- Party: Law and Justice

Rafał Romanowski (born 15 February 1978) is a Polish politician who has served as a Member of the European Parliament since 2023. He was undersecretary of state at the Ministry of Agriculture and Rural Development from 2015 to 2020 and 2021 to 2022. From 2022 to 2023, he served as secretary of state in the same ministry. Romanowski was a member of the Sejm from 2019 to 2023 and became a Member of the European Parliament of the 9th term in November 2023.

== Biography ==
Romanowski comes from the village of Szulmierza, Gmina Regimin in Ciechanów County, Masovian Voivodeship. He is a graduate of studies in journalism and public relations at the Faculty of Political Science of the Pułtusk Academy of Humanities and in the field of marketing and advertising at the same university. He completed Executive MBA postgraduate studies at the University of Management in Warsaw. In 2022, he obtained a PhD in social sciences from the Military University of Technology in Warsaw.

He worked at local television in Ciechanów and at Polkomtel. Then, from 2006, he was an advisor to Henryk Kowalczyk (then Secretary of State in the Ministry of Agriculture and Rural Development), as well as the head of his office as the government plenipotentiary for shaping the agricultural system.

From August 2007 to 16 November 2007 he served as Undersecretary of State at the Ministry of Agriculture and Rural Development. In the 2007 Polish parliamentary election, he unsuccessfully ran for the Sejm from the last place on the Law and Justice list in the Płock district (he received 3,419 votes). From 2009, he worked for the commercial law company Stadnina Koni "Nowe Jankowice", among others. as a proxy. From 2009, he was also vice-president of the management board of a limited liability company called Grupa Hodowcy Koni "Cold-blooded Horse".

He served as vice-president of the board of the Coldblood Horse Breeders' Association (2009–2017), and then in 2018 he became a member of the board of this organization. He chaired the council of the Local Action Group "Orzyc-Narew" (2011–2016), and in 2013 he became the president of the Przyjazne Przedszkole Association in Maków Mazowiecki.

In November 2015, he again became deputy minister of agriculture with the rank of undersecretary of state. In the 2018 local elections, he was elected from the Law and Justice list as a councillor of the Masovian assembly of the 6th term.

In the 2019 European election, he ran for the European Parliament in the Masovian constituency winning 11,420 votes but being too far down the list to be elected. In the parliamentary election later that year he ran for the Sejm in Constituency 16. In January 2020, he left the position of deputy minister. In March 2020, he became the plenipotentiary of the Minister of State Assets, Jacek Sasin with responsibility for agri-food. In November 2021, he returned to the position of Undersecretary of State at the Ministry of Agriculture and Rural Development.

In February 2022, he obtained the right to take up the parliamentary seat vacated by Łukasz Szumowski. In the same month, he moved to the position of secretary of state in the Ministry of Agriculture, and also became the government's plenipotentiary for shaping the agricultural system. He lost his seat in the October 2023 Polish parliamentary election. In November 2023, he was elected MEP of the 9th term, replacing Zbigniew Kuźmiuka. As a result, he ended his position as deputy minister. In the European Parliament he joined the group of European Conservatives and Reformists.

== Medals ==
He was awarded the Silver Medal of Merit for National Defence.

== See also ==
- List of Sejm members (2019–2023)
- List of members of the European Parliament for Poland, 2019–2024

== Bibliography ==
- "Podsekretarz Stanu – Rafał Romanowski". minrol.gov.pl. 2 December 2015.
