= Elżbieta Kruk =

Polish politician (born 1959)

Elżbieta Małgorzata Kruk
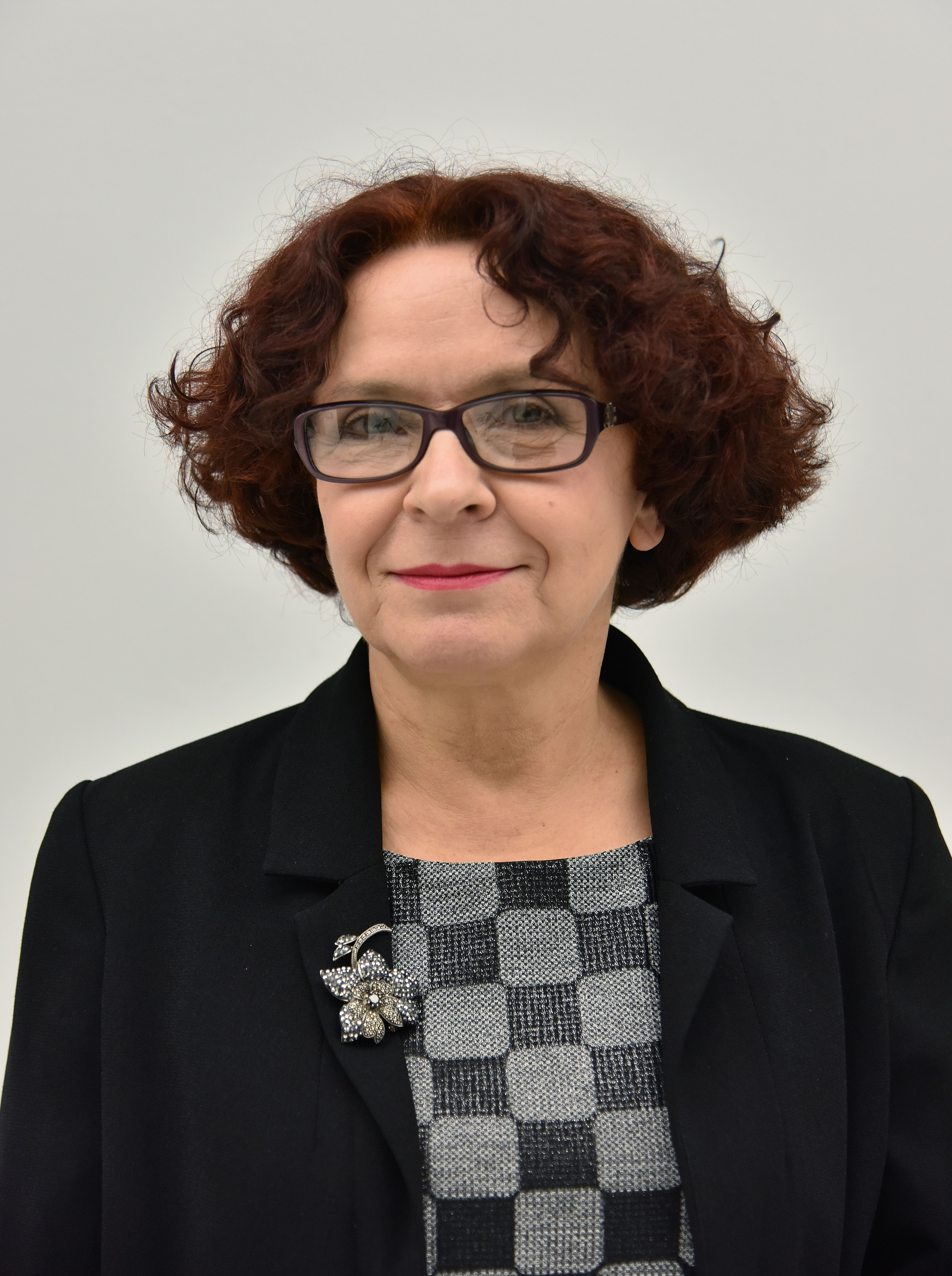

Member of the Sejm
- In office 19 October 2001 – 6 February 2006
- Constituency: 6 – Lublin
- In office 5 November 2007 – 4 June 2019

Member of the European Parliament
- In office 2 July 2019 – 15 July 2024

Personal details
- Born: 19 November 1959 (age 66) Lublin, Poland
- Party: Law and Justice
- Education: John Paul II Catholic University of Lublin
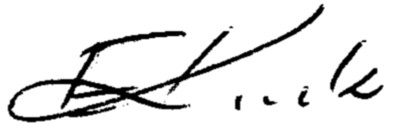
- Signature

Elżbieta Małgorzata Kruk (born 19 November 1959 in Lublin) is a Polish politician, a member of Law and Justice (national conservative political party in Poland). She was a member of the Sejm between 2001–2006, and again from 2007 until 2019.
