= Wojciech Szczęsny Kaczmarek =

Polish physicist and politician (1942–2009)

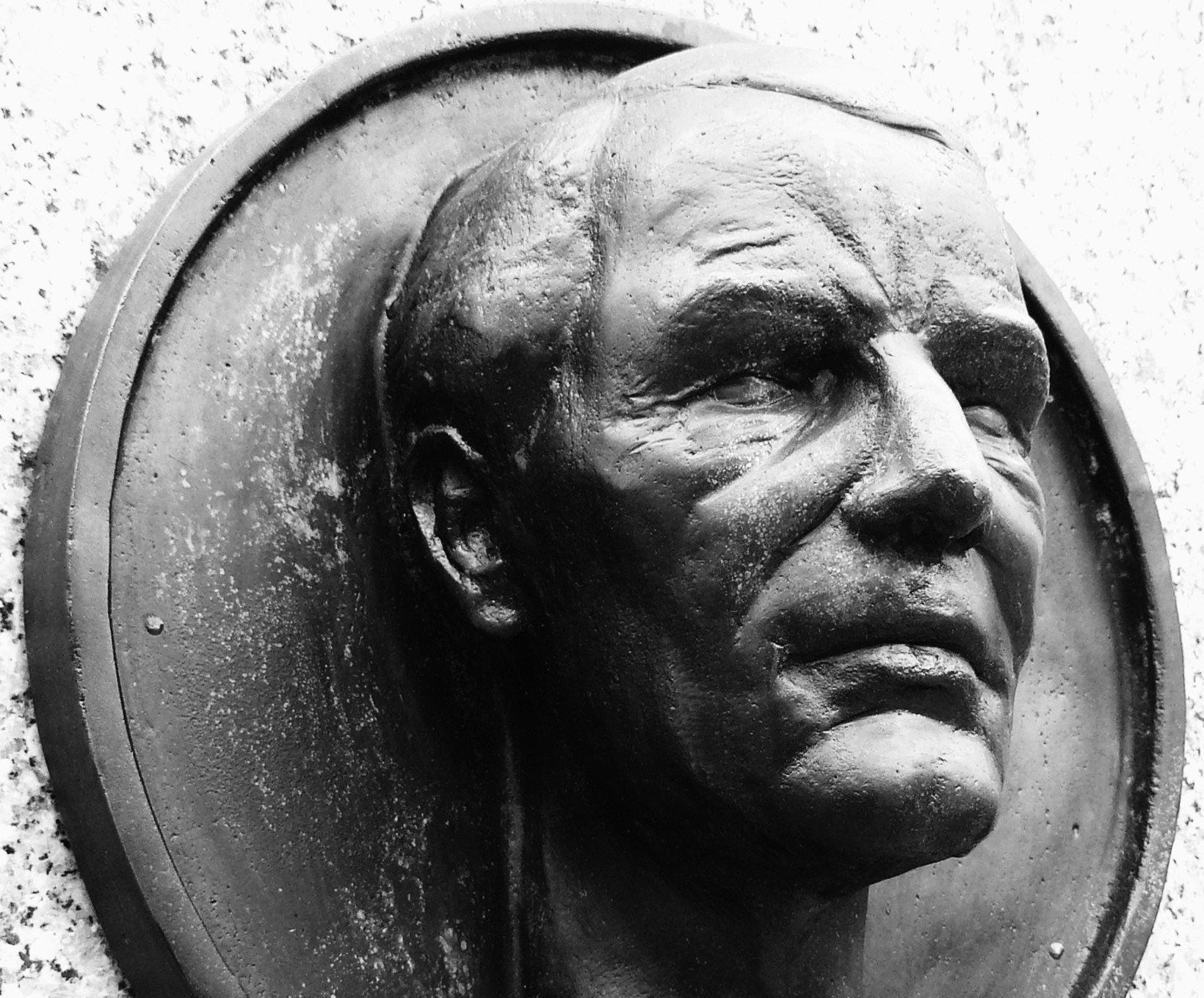
- A sculpture of Wojciech Szczęsny Kaczmarek.

Consul-General of Poland in Paris, France
- In office 2000–2003

Member of the Poznań City Council
- In office 1998–2002

Mayor of Poznań
- In office 6 June 1990 – 14 December 1998
- Preceded by: Andrzej Wituski
- Succeeded by: Ryszard Grobelny

Personal details
- Born: 24 March 1942 Luboń, Germany (now part of Poland)
- Died: 26 May 2009 (aged 67) Poznań, Poland
- Party: Democratic Party; Initiative for Poland; Freedom Union
- Education: Adam Mickiewicz University

Wojciech Szczęsny Kaczmarek (Polish: [ˈvɔj.t͡ɕɛx ˈʂt͡ʂɛw̃s.nɘ̟ kat͡ʂˈma.rɛk]; 24 March 1942 – 26 May 2009) was a physicist and politician. From 1990 to 1998, he was the mayor of Poznań, Poland.

== Biography ==
Wojciech Szczęsny Kaczmarek was born on 24 March 1942 in Luboń, Reich District of Wartheland, Nazi Germany (now part of the Greater Poland Voivodeship, Poland). His father, Telesfor Kaczmarek was of Polish descent, and his mother, Zyta Kaczmarek (née Omaszt), was of Hungarian descent. At the age of two, he got sick from polio.

In 1966, Kaczmarek graduated from the Faculty of Physics of the Adam Mickiewicz University in Poznań. He worked as a physicist until 1990, including at the ETH Zurich, the Sorbonne Paris North University, and the Adam Mickiewicz University in Poznań.

In the 1980s, Kaczmarek was an activist in the Solidarity trade union. In 1990, he was elected by the city council as the mayor of Poznań, with a difference of one vote. He took office on 6 June 1990, and following his reelection in 1994, he remained in office until 14 December 1998. He was a co-founder and a chairperson of the Association of Polish Cities. From 1990 to 2002, he was a member of the Poznań City Council. At the time, he belonged to the Freedom Union. In 2002, Kaczmarek unsuccessfully ran for office of the mayor of Poznań in a direct election. From 2000 to 2003, he was the consul-general of Poland in Paris.

In 2004, Kaczmarek unsuccessfully run of office of a member of the European Parliament, as a candidate of the Initiative for Poland, and in 2005, he unsuccessfully run of office as a member of the Sejm of Poland, as a candidate of the Democratic Party.

Kaczmarek died on 26 May 2009 in Poznań, and was buried at the Junikowo Cemetery in said city. In 2011, a monument dedicated to him was unveiled at the Greater Poland Citizens Memorial Cemetery in Poznań.

== Awards and decorations ==
- National Order of the Legion of Honour (France, 1997)
- Officer's Cross of the Order of Polonia Restituta (Poland, 1999)
- Commander's Cross of the Order of Polonia Restituta (Poland, 2009)
