= Maria Pańczyk-Pozdziej =

Polish journalist, teacher, and politician (1942–2022)

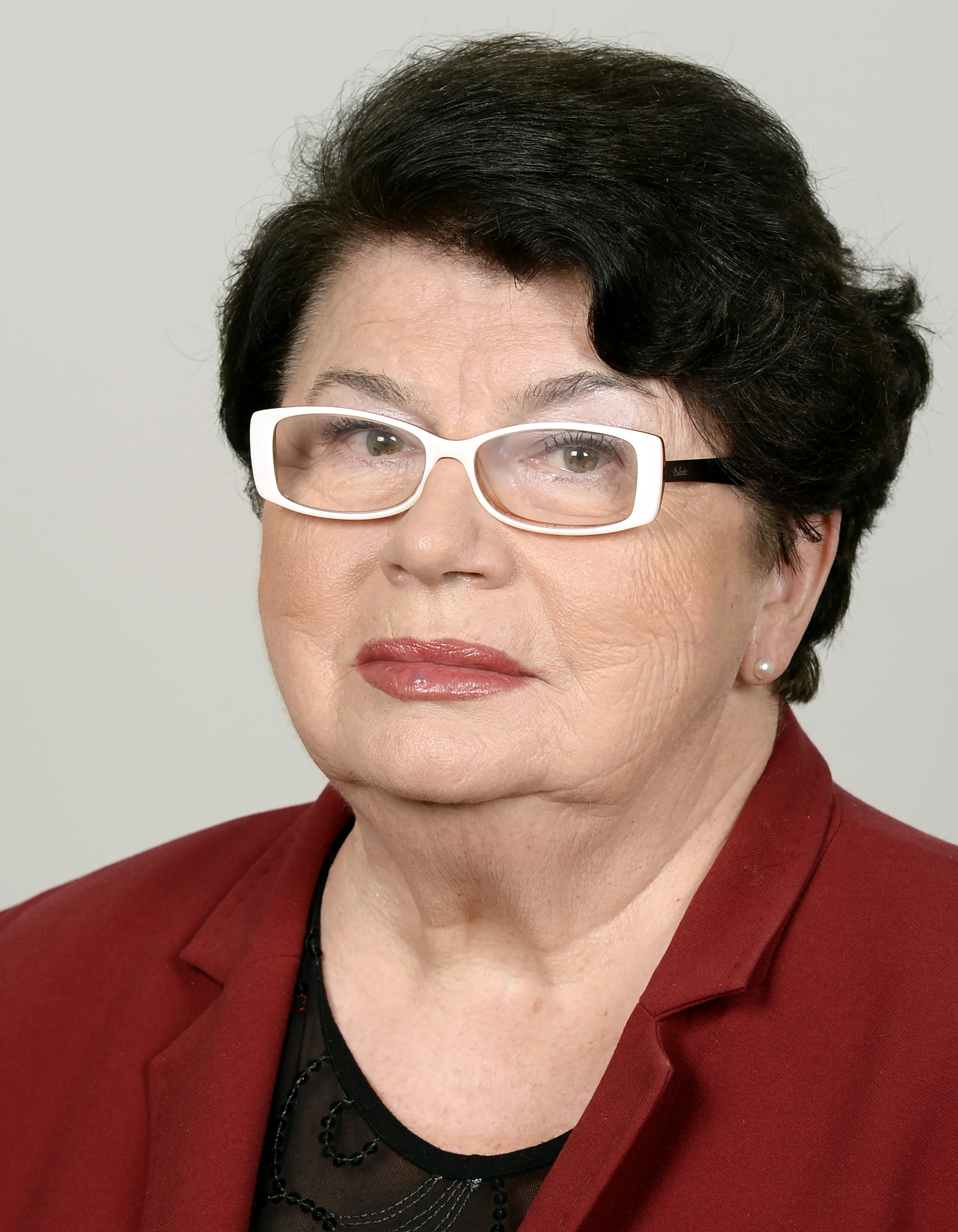
- Pańczyk-Pozdziej in 2015

Member of the Senate of Poland
- In office 20 October 2005 – 11 November 2019

Personal details
- Born: Maria Pańczyk; 10 January 1942 Tarnowskie Góry, General Government, Germany
- Died: 12 May 2022 (aged 80)
- Party: PO
- Education: University of Opole
- Occupation: Journalist; Teacher

Maria Pańczyk-Pozdziej (10 January 1942 – 12 May 2022) was a Polish politician. A member of the Civic Platform, she served in the Senate of Poland from 2005 to 2019. She died on 12 May 2022 at the age of 80.
