= Masovian (European Parliament constituency) =

Constituency of the European Parliament

- European Parliament constituency
- Location among the current constituencies

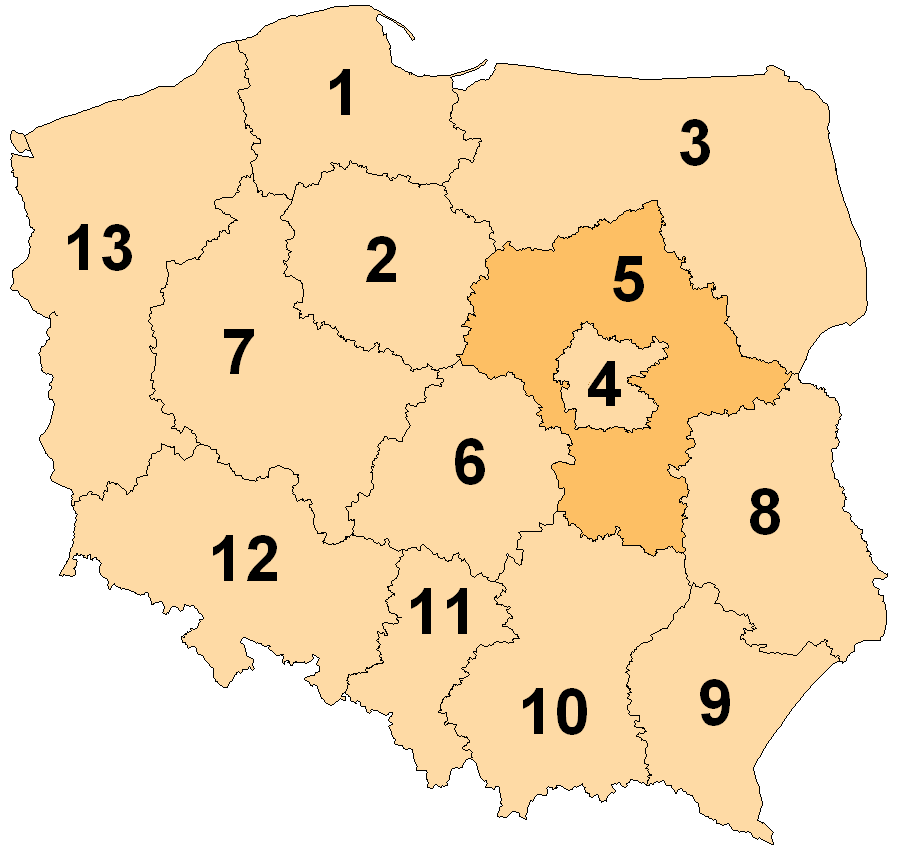
- 5th constituency in Poland
- Member state: Poland
- Created: 2004
- MEPs: 3

Masovian (Polish: mazowieckie) is a constituency of the European Parliament. It covers the Masovian Voivodeship with the exception of the Warsaw constituency.

== Nomenclature ==
The relevant Polish legislation ("The Act of 23 January 2004 on Elections to the European Parliament") establishing the constituencies does not give the constituencies formal names. Instead, each constituency has a number, territorial description, and location of the Constituency Electoral Commission. The 2004 Polish National Election Commission and the 2004 European Parliament Election website uses the territorial description when referring to the constituency, not the electoral commission location.

== Members of the European Parliament ==
Election	MEP (party)	MEP (party)	MEP (party)
2004	Marek Czarnecki (SRP)	Dariusz Grabowski (LPR)	Zbigniew Kuźmiuk (PSL)
2009	Adam Bielan (PiS)	Jolanta Hibner (PO)	Jarosław Kalinowski (PSL) (KE)
2014	Zbigniew Kuźmiuk (PiS)	Julia Pitera (PO)	Jarosław Kalinowski (PSL) (KE)
2019	Zbigniew Kuźmiuk (PiS)	Adam Bielan (PiS)	Jarosław Kalinowski (PSL) (KE)
2023	Rafał Romanowski (PiS)	Adam Bielan (PiS)	Jarosław Kalinowski (PSL) (KE)
2024	Jacek Ozdoba (PiS)	Adam Bielan (PiS)	Andrzej Halicki (KO)

== Election results ==
=== 2004 ===
2004 European Parliament election
Electoral committee	Votes	%	Seats
Self-Defence of the Republic of Poland	71,323	20.84	1
League of Polish Families	63,944	18.68	1
Civic Platform	54,702	15.98	–
Polish People's Party	48,930	14.30	1
Law and Justice	37,947	11.09	–
Democratic Left Alliance – Labour Union	22,297	6.51	–
Social Democracy of Poland	13,137	3.84	–
Freedom Union	10,379	3.03	–
Real Politics Union	6,113	1.79	–
National Electoral Committee	3,149	0.92	–
Initiative for Poland	2,605	0.76	–
Polish Labour Party	2,553	0.75	–
KPEiR–PLD	2,447	0.71	–
All-Poland Civic Coalition	1,811	0.53	–
Polish National Party	912	0.27	–
Total	342,249	100.00	3
Valid votes	342,249	96.92	
Invalid/blank votes	10,860	3.08	
Total votes	353,109	100.00	
Registered voters/turnout	1,962,979	17.99	
Source: PKW

=== 2009 ===
2009 European Parliament election
Electoral committee	Votes	%	Seats
Law and Justice	129,165	33.28	1
Civic Platform	114,000	29.37	1
Polish People's Party	72,551	18.69	1
Democratic Left Alliance – Labour Union	30,225	7.79	–
Right Wing of the Republic	10,443	2.69	–
Agreement for the Future – CenterLeft	8,567	2.21	–
Libertas Poland	8,437	2.17	–
Self-Defence of the Republic of Poland	7,995	2.06	–
Real Politics Union	3,832	0.99	–
Polish Labour Party	2,931	0.76	–
Total	388,146	100.00	3
Valid votes	388,146	97.95	
Invalid/blank votes	8,107	2.05	
Total votes	396,253	100.00	
Registered voters/turnout	2,007,639	19.74	
Source: National Electoral Commission

=== 2014 ===
2014 European Parliament election
Electoral committee	Votes	%	Seats
Law and Justice	163,775	41.77	1
Civic Platform	75,369	19.22	1
Polish People's Party	61,259	15.62	1
Congress of the New Right	27,671	7.06	–
Democratic Left Alliance – Labour Union	24,647	6.29	–
United Poland	11,464	2.92	–
Europa Plus—Your Movement	10,710	2.73	–
Poland Together	10,485	2.67	–
National Movement	6,686	1.71	–
Total	392,066	100.00	3
Valid votes	392,066	96.62	
Invalid/blank votes	13,736	3.38	
Total votes	405,802	100.00	
Registered voters/turnout	2,020,737	20.08	
Source: National Electoral Commission

=== 2019 ===
2019 European Parliament election
Electoral committee	Votes	%	Seats
Law and Justice	512,158	60.20	2
European Coalition	227,106	26.69	1
Confederation	34,923	4.10	–
Spring	33,302	3.91	–
Kukiz'15	27,829	3.27	–
Poland Fair Play	6,784	0.80	–
Lewica Razem	6,434	0.76	–
Unity of Nation	2,211	0.26	–
Total	850,747	100.00	3
Valid votes	850,747	99.06	
Invalid/blank votes	8,053	0.94	
Total votes	858,800	100.00	
Registered voters/turnout	1,982,688	43.31	
Source: National Electoral Commission

=== 2024 ===
2024 European Parliament election
Electoral committee	Votes	%	Seats
Law and Justice	353,247	49.17	2
Civic Coalition	171,044	23.81	1
Confederation	92,949	12.94	0
Third Way	65,399	9.10	0
The Left	23,383	3.25	0
Bezpartyjni Samorządowcy	5,000	0.70	0
Voice of Strong Poland	2,167	0.30	0
Normal Country	1,596	0.22	0
PolExit	1,447	0.20	0
Repair Poland Movement	1,426	0.20	0
Liberal Poland – Entrepreneurs' Strike	733	0.10	0
Total	718,391	100.00	3
Valid votes	718,391	99.37	
Invalid/blank votes	4,589	0.63	
Total votes	722,980	100.00	
Registered voters/turnout	1,906,952	37.91	
Source: National Electoral Commission
