= Krzysztof Piech =

Polish economist

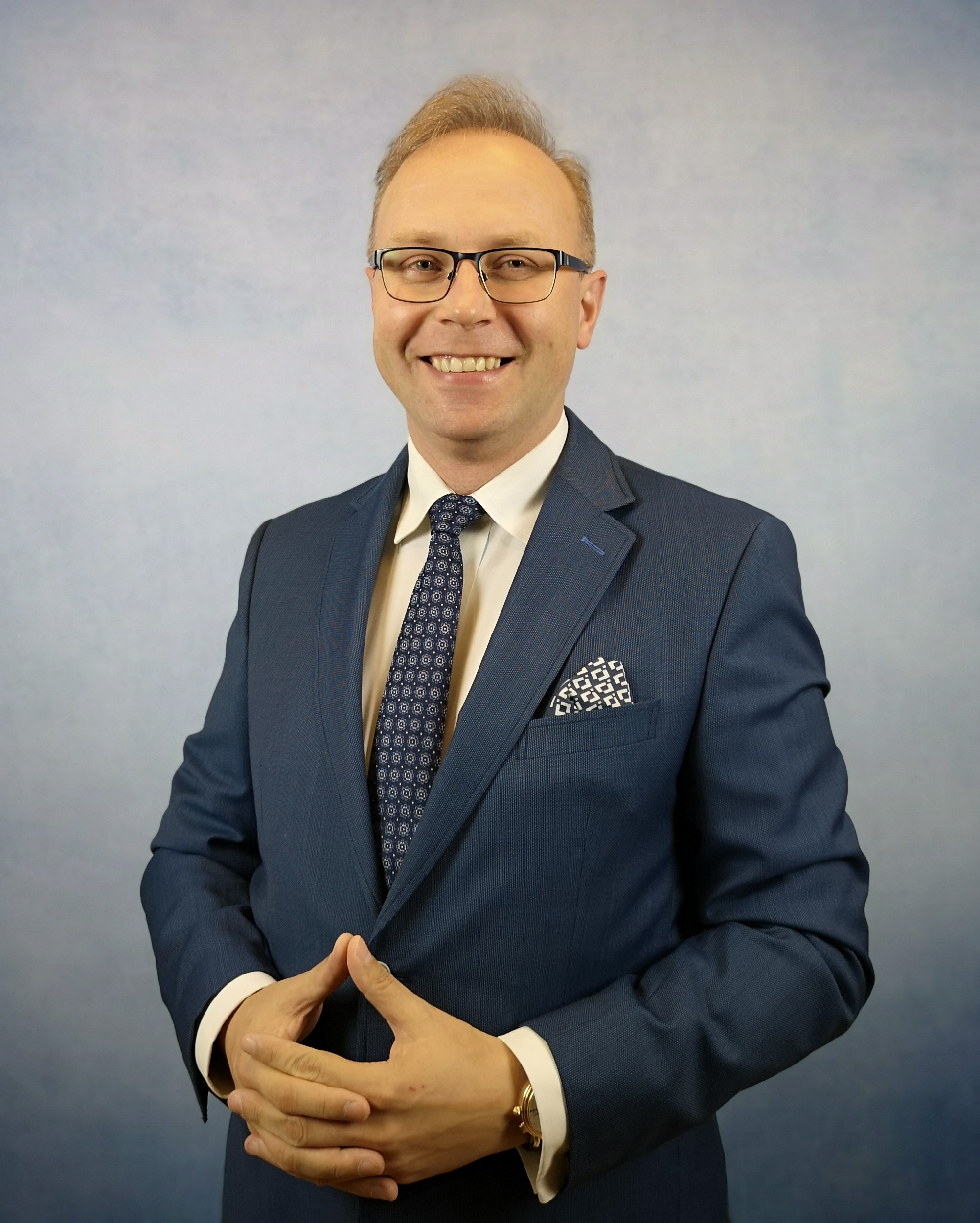
- Born: October 14, 1975 (age 51); Chelm, Poland
- Education: SGH Warsaw School of Economics
- Occupations: Economist, academic
- Children: 3

Krzysztof Piech is a Polish economist and academic, specializing in finance. He has served as Professor at Lazarski University's Faculty of Economics and Management since 2016. He also holds the position of Director of the university's Blockchain Technology Center.

== Career ==
Between 2005 and 2014, Krzysztof Piech contributed to Polish insurance market forecasts while working with several organizations, including Allianz Poland, the Institute for Market Economy Research, the Polish Insurance Enterprise, and the Polish Chamber of Insurance.

From 2016 to 2018, he served as a principal advisor to the Polish Ministry of Digital Affairs on blockchain policy.

Since 2020, Krzysztof Piech has served as an expert at the Warsaw Enterprise Institute, contributing to their annual reports on the Polish economy.

Krzysztof Piech's scholarly contributions include authoring several books on innovation and economic policy, co-editing approximately 30 academic books on economics and financial crises, and contributing over 100 articles and book chapters.

== Partial publications ==
- Foundations of using digital currencies, Warsaw 2017 (scientific ed.)
- Political economy. An introduction to the theory of economic policy, Warsaw 2016
- Mazovia's innovation position against the background of other regions of the country and Europe, Warsaw 2014–2015
- Knowledge and innovation in economic development: towards measurement and the modern role of the state, Warsaw 2009
