= Maciej Świątkowski =

Polish politician

member of Sejm 2005-2007
- In office 25 September 2005 – 2007

Personal details
- Born: 16 March 1950 (age 76)
- Party: Civic Platform

Maciej Świątkowski (born 16 March 1950 in Bydgoszcz) is a Polish politician. He was elected to Sejm on 25 September 2005, getting 8780 votes in 4 Bydgoszcz district as a candidate from Civic Platform list.

He was also a member of Senate 1997-2001.

== See also ==
- Members of Polish Sejm 2005-2007
