= Izabela Kloc =

Polish politician (born 1963)

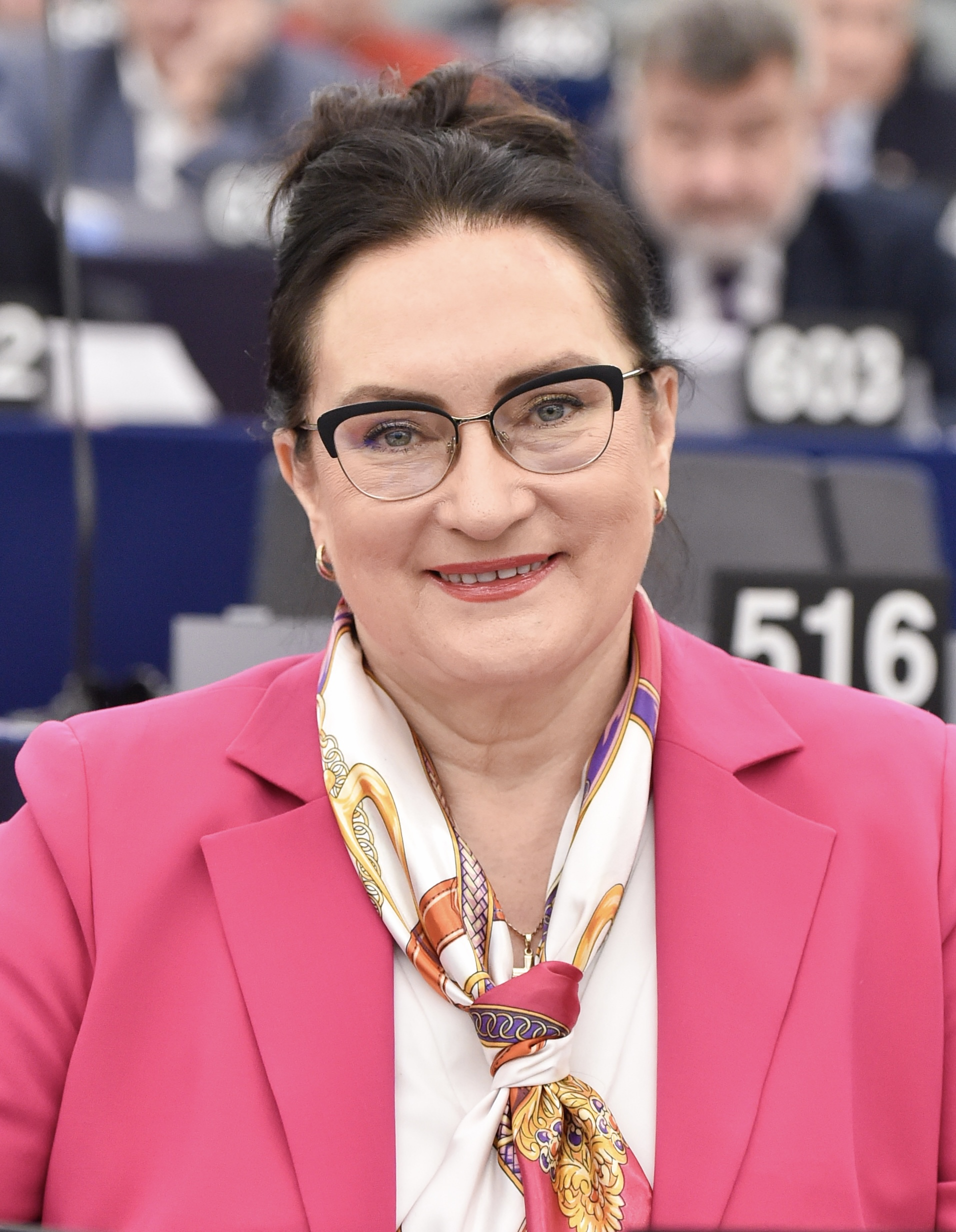

member of Sejm 2005-2007
- In office 2005–?

Personal details
- Born: 1963 (age 62–63) Mikołów, Katowice Voivodeship, Polish People's Republic
- Party: Law and Justice
- Children: 2
- Education: KUL

Izabela Helena Kloc (born 8 May 1963) is a Polish politician. She is a member of the Law and Justice party.

She was born on 8 May 1963 in Mikołów. In 1997, she graduated from the John Paul II Catholic University of Lublin with a degree in theology, and from the University of Silesia in Katowice with a master's degree in pedagogy the same year. She then completed two postgraduate courses at the University of Economics in Katowice: enterprise and management in 2000, and European Union project management in 2003.

She was elected to the Silesian Voivodeship Sejmik as a councillor in 1998, and remained in that position until 2002. In the 2002 local elections, she ran for the Pszczyna County council as part of the voters' electoral committee Rodzina, Wspólnota, Sprawiedliwość (transl. Family, Community, Justice). She received 7.12% of the valid votes cast in the electoral division (okręg). She was a member of the council until 2005.

During her term in the European Parliament from July 2019 to July 2024, she was a member of the European Conservatives and Reformists Group.

She ran in the 2024 European Parliament election in Poland for European Parliament constituency 11, comprising Silesian Voivodeship. She did not achieve a mandate, receiving only 2.60% (34,667 votes) out of 1,332,121 total votes cast in the voivodeship. The highest proportion of votes she received was in Rybnik County (12.70%), and the lowest in Myszków County (0.24%).

She is married, and has two children.

== See also ==
- Members of Polish Sejm 2005-2007
