= Andżelika Możdżanowska =

Polish politician

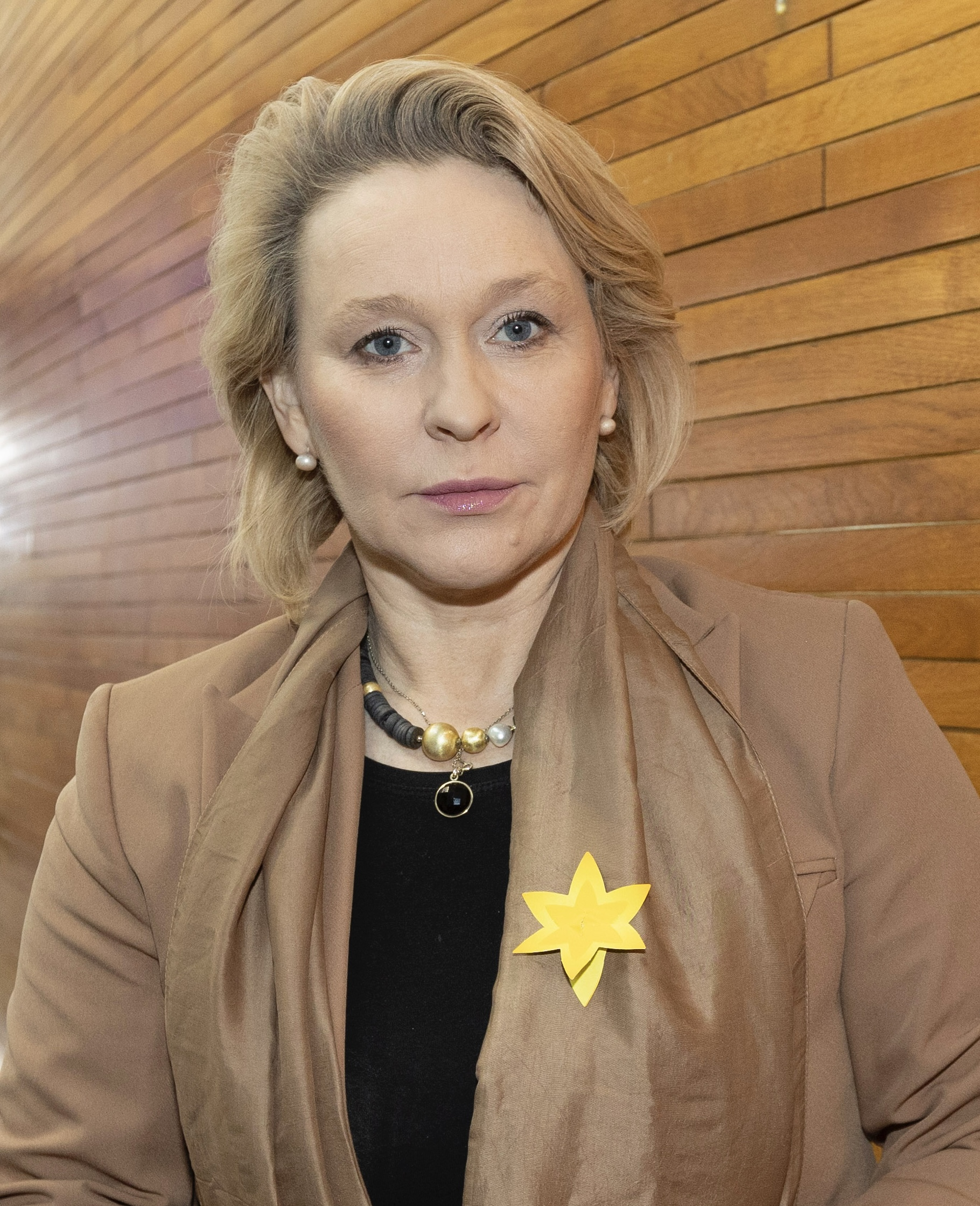
- Andżelika Możdżanowska in 2023

Member of the 9th European Parliament
- In office 2 July 2019 – 15 July 2024
- Constituency: Greater Poland

Deputy of the VIII Sejm
- In office 12 November 2015 – 28 May 2019
- Succeeded by: Piotr Walkowski
- Constituency: 36 Kalisz

Member of the VIII Senate
- Constituency: 95 Ostrów Wielkopolski

Personal details
- Born: 20 March 1975 (age 51) Kępno, Polish People's Republic
- Party: Law and Justice (since 2019)
- Other political affiliations: Polish People's Party (until 2019)

Andżelika Anna Możdżanowska is a Polish politician who previously served as a Member of the European Parliament for the Law and Justice political party. She previously held positions in the Senate and Sejm.
