= Alfred Domagalski =

Alfred Antoni Domagalski
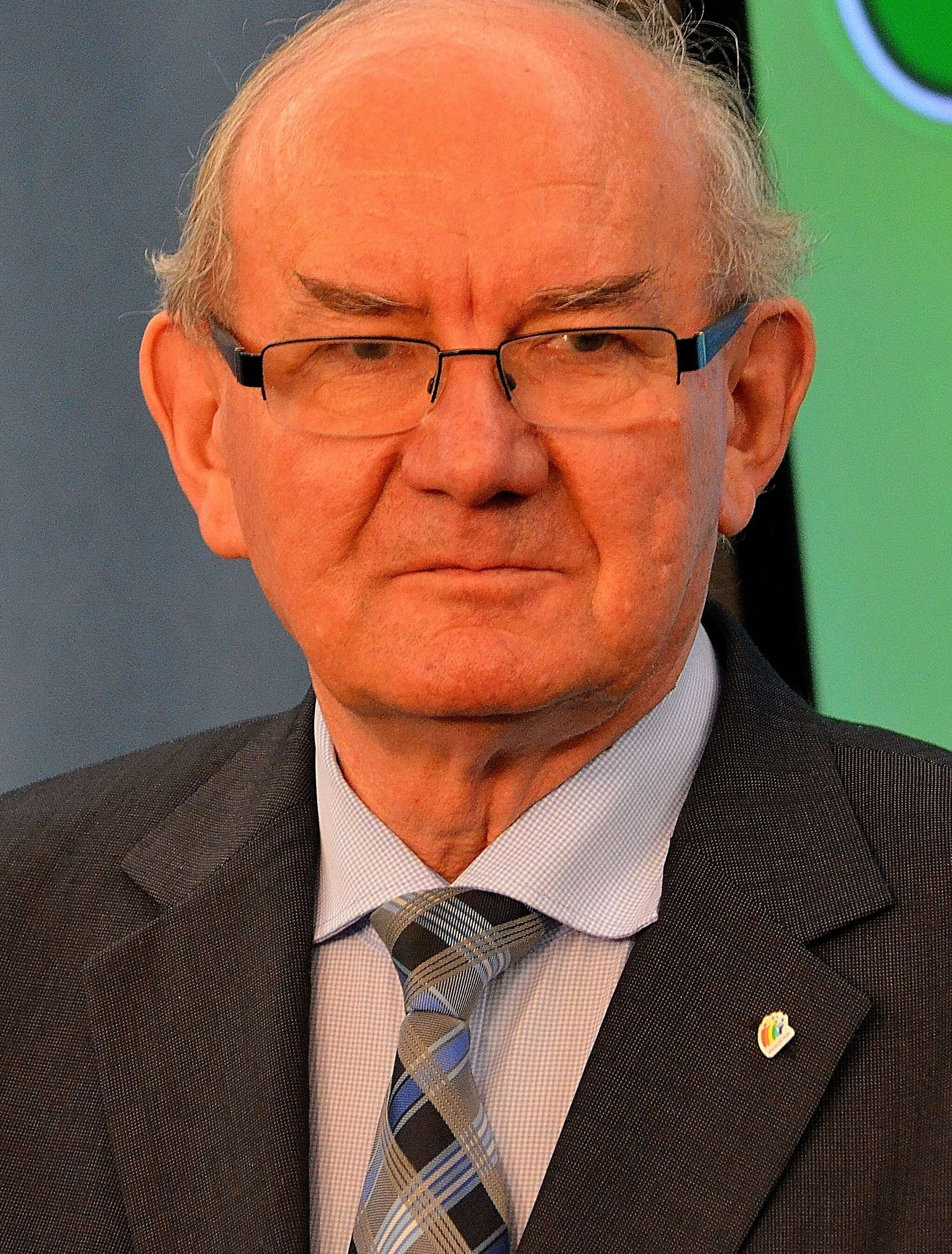
- Domagalski in 2013

Personal details
- Born: 1 January 1945 (age 81) Kielce, Poland
- Party: Polish People's Party

Alfred Antoni Domagalski (born 1 January 1945 in Kielce) is a Polish politician, social activist, member of the Sejm in 1993–1997, in 1997–2000 he served as the Head of the Supreme Council of the Polish People's Party.

== Biography ==
He graduated in 1974 from the SGH Warsaw School of Economics. Associated with the cooperative movement, he assumed the role chairman of the Board of the National Cooperative Council.

In 1967 he joined the United People's Party (ZSL) and later the Polish People's Party (PSL). On the electoral list of PSL, he was elected to the Sejm in 1993–1997 from the Kielce electoral district, running unsuccessfully for re-election in 1997. In 1997, he replaced Józef Zych as Head of the Supreme Council of PSL. In 2000, he was succeeded by Franciszek Stefaniuk. In 2001 he unsuccessfully ran for a seat in the Senate. In 1989–2006, he was the chairman of the Świętokrzyskie branch of PSL, in 2006 succeeded by Adam Jarubas. In 2004–2016, he served as the Deputy Head of the Supreme Council of PSL. He was also the head of the ARiMR council.

== Awards ==
Awarded the Officer's Cross of the Order of Polonia Restituta (1999) and the Honorary Badge of Holy Cross Voivodeship (2018).

== Bibliography ==
- "Alfred Domagalski", Sejm Rzeczypospolitej Polskiej
