= Bolesław Piecha =

Polish politician (born 1954)

Bolesław Grzegorz Piecha
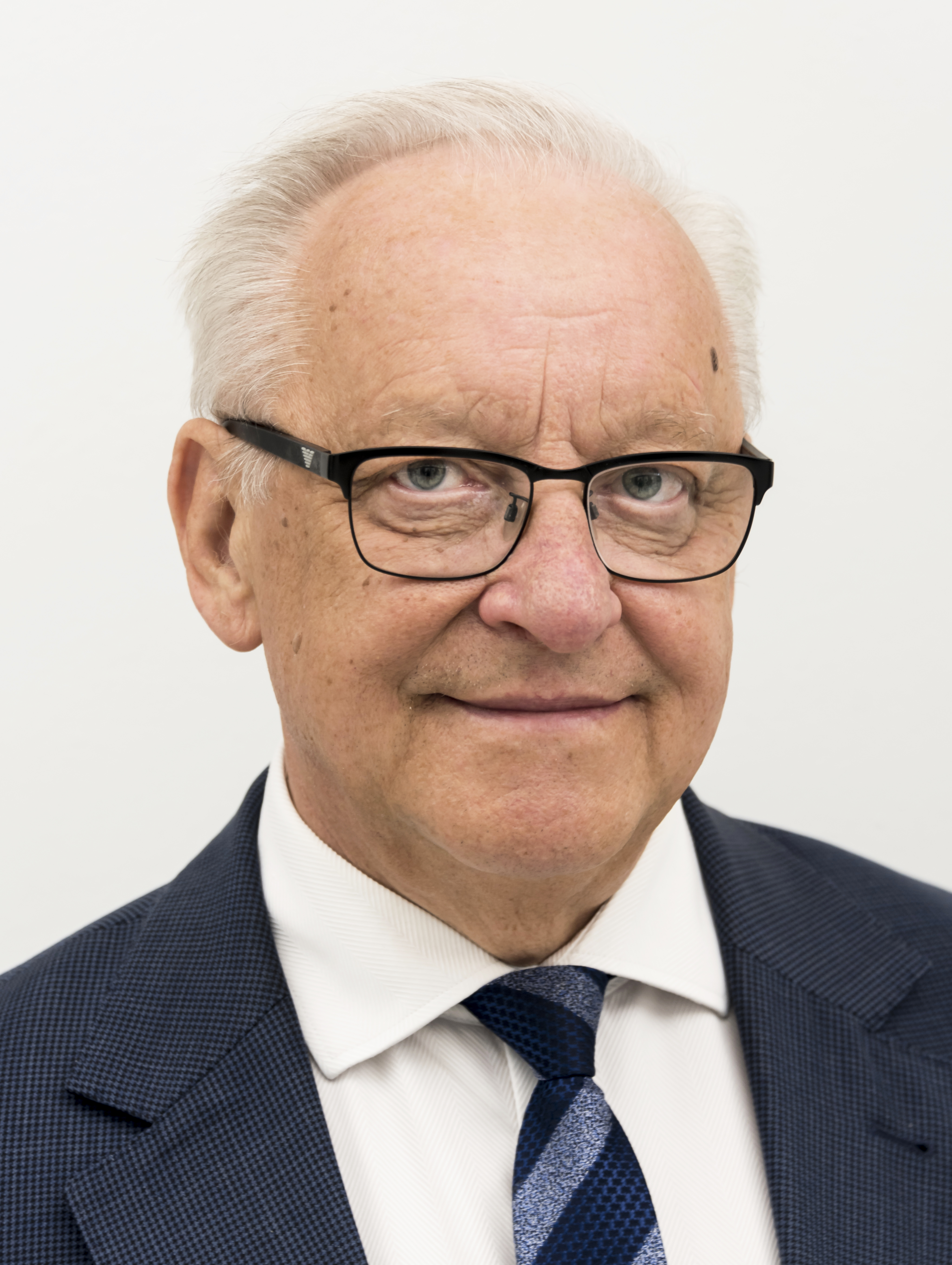
- Boleslaw Piecha in 2022

member of Sejm 2019–2023
- Incumbent
- Assumed office 12 November 2019

Personal details
- Born: 19 September 1954 (age 72) Rybnik
- Party: Law and Justice
- Education: Medical University of Silesia
- Profession: politician, parliamentarian, physician

Bolesław Grzegorz Piecha (born 19 September 1954 in Rybnik) is a Polish politician. He was elected to Sejm on 25 September 2005, getting 23887 votes in 30 Rybnik district as a candidate from Law and Justice list. He was vice-minister of health.

He was also a member of Sejm 2001-2005.

On occasion of limiting access of children to hospices, Piecha is known to explain "Children [under palliative care - ed.] with non-oncological diseases are not going to die within a reasonable period of time [!!!-ed.]. They will live for many years and require palliative care."

Piecha is a Member of the European Parliament (MEP) since 2014.

== See also ==
- Members of Polish Sejm 2005-2007
