= Zdzisław Podkański =

Polish politician (1949–2022)

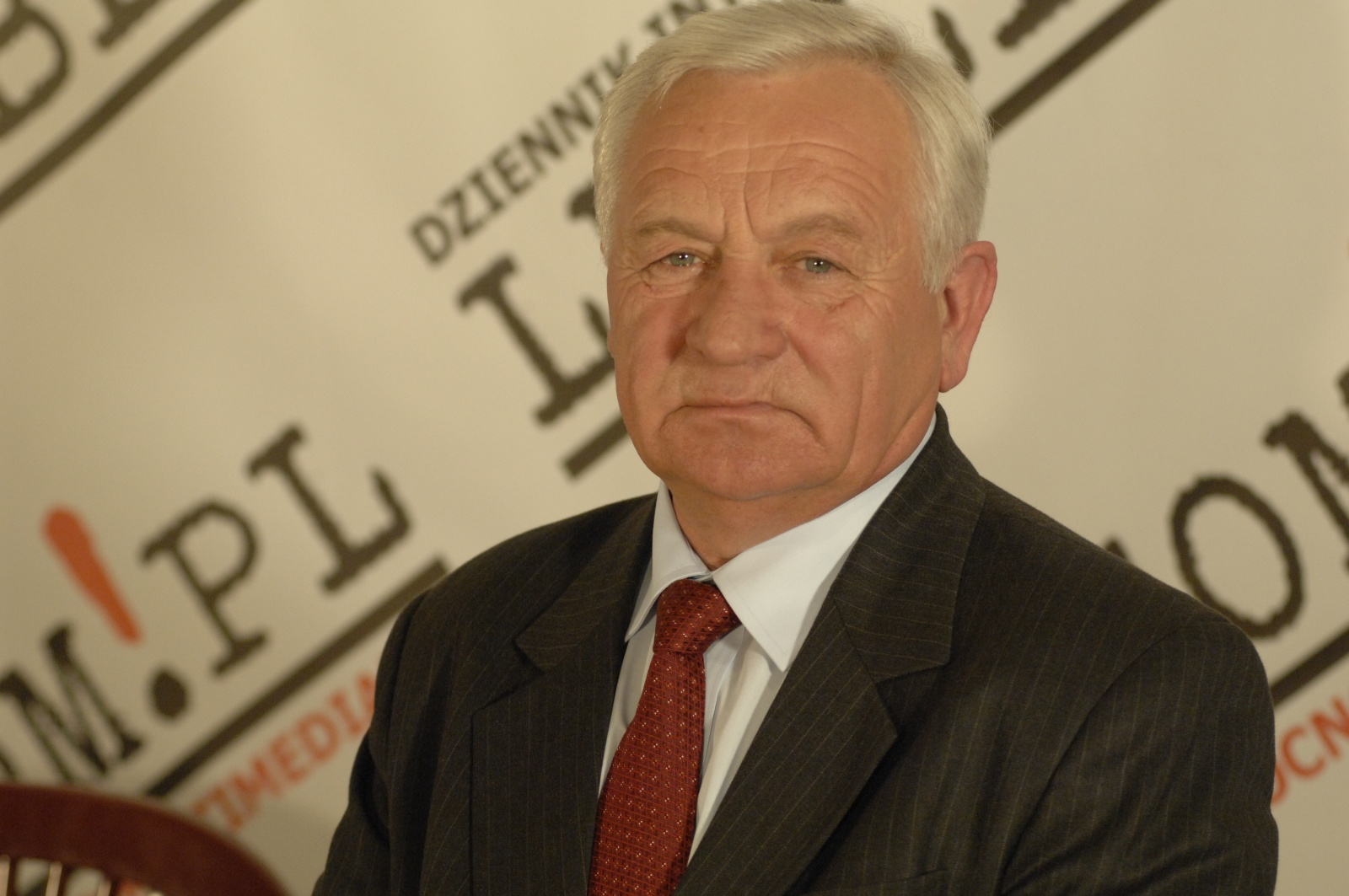
Zdzisław Podkański

Zdzisław Zbigniew Podkański (18 October 1949 – 18 February 2022) was a Polish politician.

== Biography ==
Podkański was born Guzówka, Poland. He was a Member of the European Parliament (MEP) for the Lublin Voivodship with the Polish People's Party, part of the European People's Party and he was sitting on the European Parliament's Committee on Culture and Education.

Podkański was a substitute for the Committee on Agriculture and Rural Development and a vice-chair of the Delegation to the EU-Moldova Parliamentary Cooperation Committee.

He died on 18 February 2022, at the age of 72.

== Education ==
- 1972: Master of History, Maria Curie-Skłodowska University

== Career ==
- 1973–1975: Employee of the Society for the Dissemination of General Knowledge (1972–1973), then on the Voivodship Committee of the ZSL (United Peasant's Party)
- 1975–1980: Vice-Chairman of the Voivodship Administration of the Naval Sports Group (ZSMW) and section head in youth organisations
- 1980–1984: Section head on the Voivodship Committee of the ZSL
- 1984–1992: Director of the central administration of the Association of Folk Craftsmen (STL)
- 1992–1994: Plenipotentiary to the Minister of Culture and Art
- Councillor (1984–1989) and Vice-Chairman (1988–1989) People's Town Council in Lublin
- 1991-: Chairman of the Voivodship Administration of the Polish People's Party (PSL) in Lublin
- since 2004: Vice-Chairman PSL
- 1994–1996: Under-secretary of State at the Ministry of Culture and Art
- 1996–1997: Minister of Culture and Art
- Member of Parliament of the Republic of Poland (1993–2004), Vice-Chairman of the Parliamentary Culture and Media Committee

== Decorations ==
- Gold Cross of Merit

== See also ==
- 2004 European Parliament election in Poland
