= Zbigniew Zysk =

Polish politician (1950–2020)

Zbigniew Zysk (25 April 1950 – 4 November 2020) was a Polish politician.

== Biography ==
Zysk was born in Olsztyn. He was a member of the Sejm from 1993 to 1997, elected on the lists of Labour Union, before switching to the New Democracy party and eventually sitting in the Sejm as an independent.

He died of COVID-19 in Olsztyn, at age 70, during the pandemic in Poland.
