= Piech =

Central European surname

Piech or Pieech (German: Piëch; Polish: Piech) is a Central European surname. This Slavic name originates from Poland, and spread to Czechoslovakia and Germany. It is known for being held by members of the Austrian business family Porsche-Piëch clan.

== Persons ==
Notable people with the surname include:

- Anton Piëch (1894–1952), Austrian lawyer, co-founder of Porsche GmbH, and manager of Volkswagen GmbH
- Ferdinand Piëch (1937–2019), Austrian business magnate, son of Anton Piëch and Louise Piëch
- Louise Piëch (1904–1999), Austrian businessperson, wife of Anton Piëch, daughter of Ferdinand Porsche
- Arkadiusz Piech (born 1985), Polish footballer
- Krzysztof Piech (born 1975), Polish economist

== Families and lineages ==
Notable familial groupings with this surname include:

- Piëch family, the Austrian-German Porsche-Pieech automotive and business clan behind Volkswagen and Porsche
