= Jan Bury =

Polish politician (born 1963)

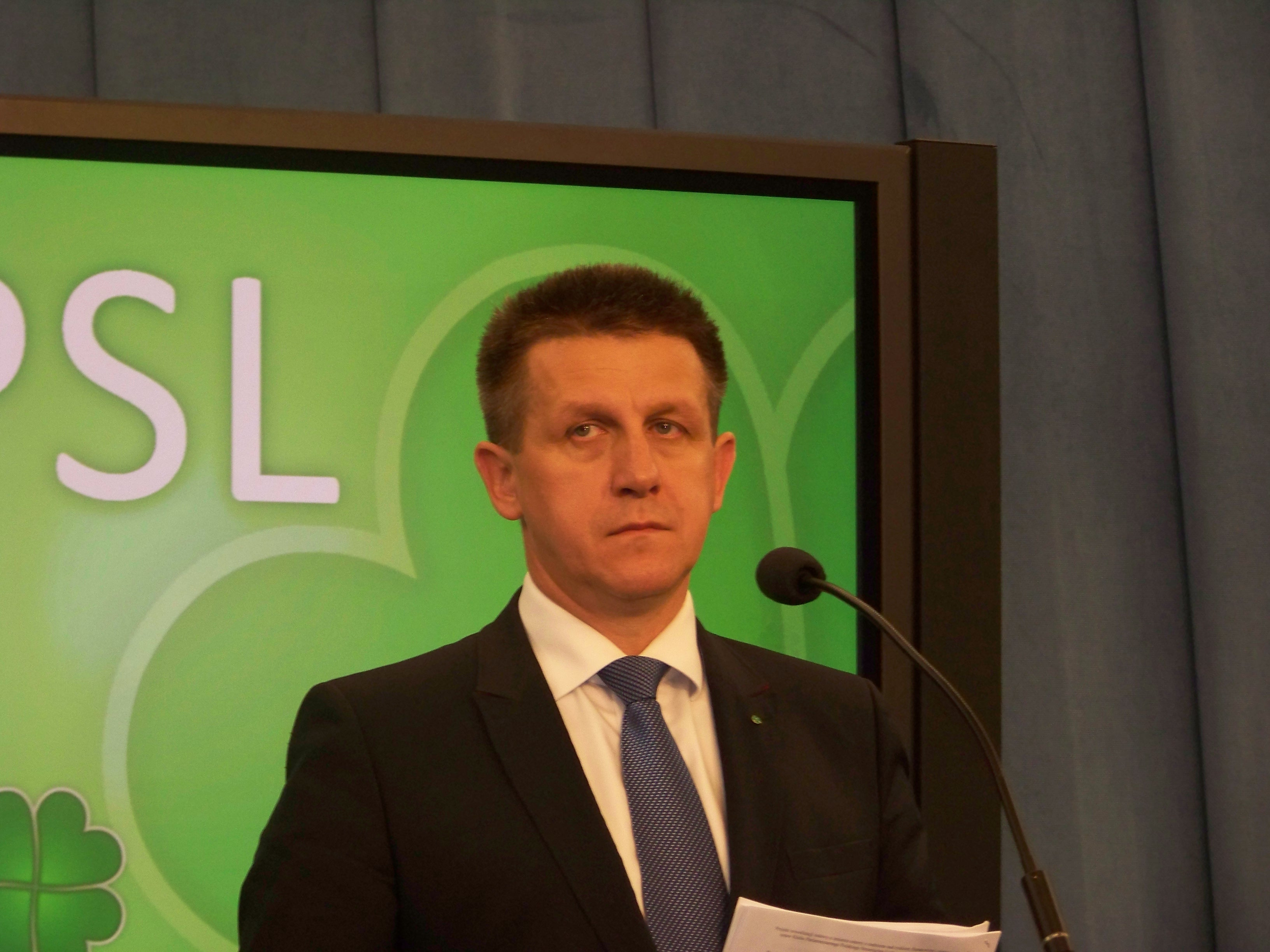

Member of Sejm 2005-2015
- In office 25 September 2005 – 11 November 2015

Personal details
- Born: 1963 (age 62–63)
- Party: Polish People's Party (1989-2015)

Jan Bury (born 1 October 1963 in Przeworsk) is a Polish politician. He was elected to the Sejm on 25 September 2005, getting 12050 votes in 23 Rzeszów district as a candidate from Polish People's Party list.

He was also a member of Sejm 1991-1993, Sejm 1993-1997, and Sejm 2001-2005.

== See also ==
- Members of Polish Sejm 2005-2007
