= Guzówka, Lublin County =

Guzówka
- Village
- Location within Poland
- Coordinates: 50°52′01″N 22°41′50″E
- Country: Poland
- Voivodeship: Lublin
- County: Lublin
- Gmina: Wysokie
- Time zone: UTC+1 (CET)
  - Summer (DST): UTC+2 (CEST)

Guzówka [ɡuˈzufka] is a village in the administrative district of Gmina Wysokie, within Lublin County, Lublin Voivodeship, in eastern Poland.

== History ==
Four Polish citizens were murdered by Nazi Germany in the village during World War II.
