= Sławomir Juszczyk =

Polish politician (born 1958)

Sławomir Krzysztof Juszczyk
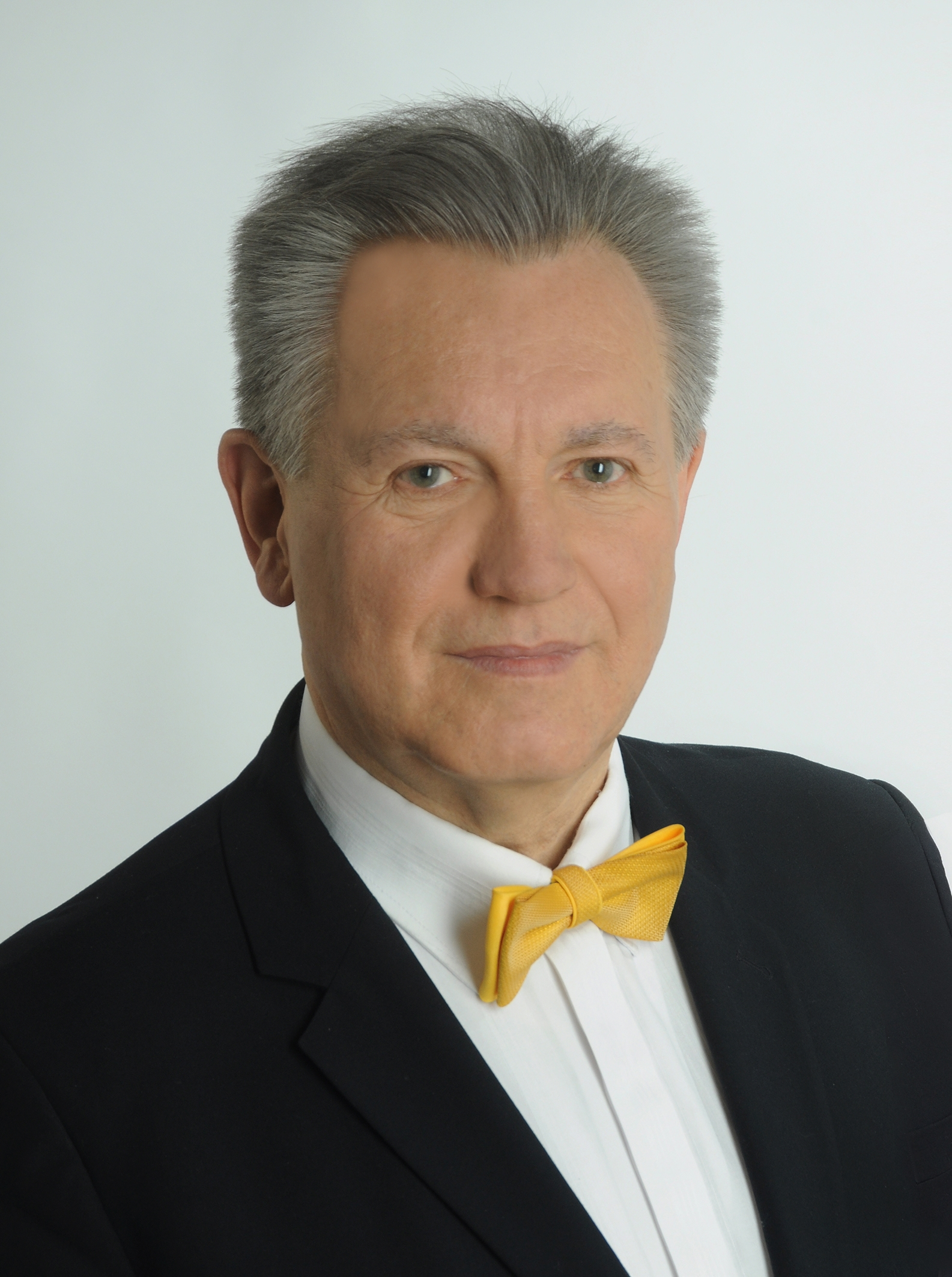
- Juszczyk in 2020
- Born: 1958 (age 67–68)
- Education: Warsaw University of Life Sciences
- Occupations: Politician, economist, professor
- Political party: Polish People's Party

Sławomir Krzysztof Juszczyk (born 1958 in Radomsko) is a Polish economist and politician, professor of economics, former deputy chairman of the Polish People's Party. In 2001–2003 he served as the Deputy Voivode of Łódź Voivodeship.

== Biography ==
Juszczyk was born in Radomsko, and moved to Warsaw. He graduated in agricultural economics from the Warsaw University of Life Sciences (SGGW) and bank management from the SGH Warsaw School of Economics. He initially worked at the Agricultural School Complex in Strzałków and Dobryszyce, later he became an academic lecturer at the SGGW. He obtained his doctorate in 1995 and his habilitation in 2006. He was appointed associate professor in 2010, on 19 December 2014 he became a titular professor, and four years later a full professor.

In his academic work, he specialized in agricultural economics and food economy, economic policy, finance and banking. He is the author of over 200 publications, including 21 books. He served, among other roles, as Head of the Department of Management at the Jan Kochanowski University branch in Piotrków Trybunalski and the Head of the Banking Division at SGGW. He collaborated with local and central government, banks, industries and the European Parliament, he served also as an FAO consultant in 2010–2014. He completed research placements in the USA and Finland.

Juszczyk was politically active as part of the Polish People's Party (PSL), until February 2005 he was vice-chairman of the Supreme Executive Committee of the PSL. In 1998–2001 he was a member of the Executive Board of Piotrków County. In 1997 he unsuccessfully ran for a seat in the Senate in Piotrków Voivodeship, gaining 35,469 votes. In 2001 he unsuccessfully ran for a seat in the Sejm and in 2004 – for a seat in the European Parliament. From 23 November 2001 to 12 March 2003 he served as the Deputy Voivode of Łódź Voivodeship, responsible for agriculture and social affairs.

Chairman of the All-Polish Association "Society of Cooperators", vice-chairman of the National Board of the Society of People's Universities of the Republic of Poland, rector of the University of Tourism and Foreign Languages in Warsaw.
