= Zbigniew Religa =

Polish cardiac surgeon and politician (1938–2009)

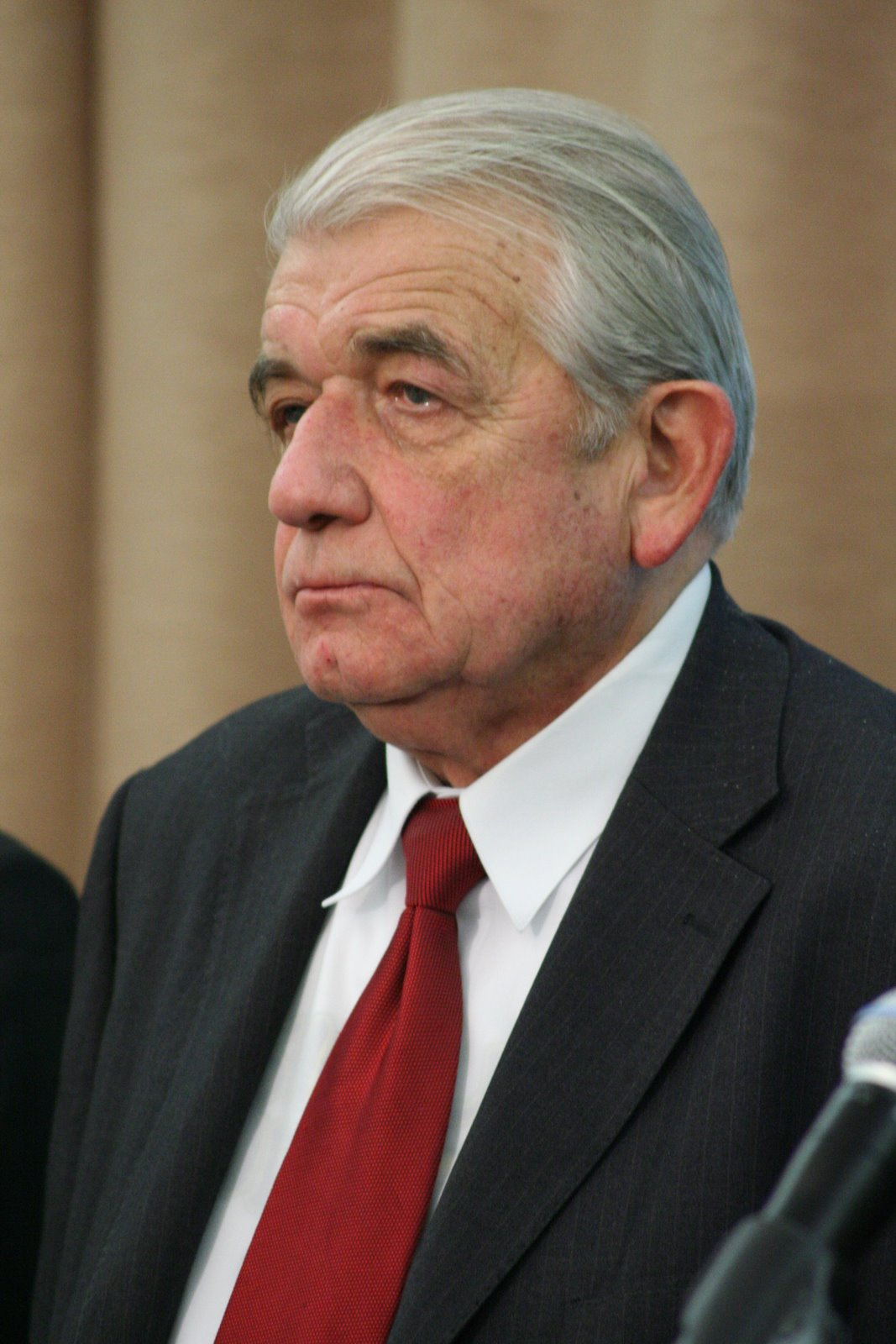
- Religa in 2008

Minister of Health
- In office 31 October 2005 – 16 November 2007
- President: Aleksander Kwaśniewski, Lech Kaczyński
- Prime Minister: Kazimierz Marcinkiewicz, Jarosław Kaczyński
- Preceded by: Marek Balicki
- Succeeded by: Ewa Kopacz

Personal details
- Born: Zbigniew Eugeniusz Religa; 16 December 1938 Miedniewice, Poland
- Died: 8 March 2009 (aged 70) Warsaw, Poland
- Party: BBWR
- Spouse: Anna Wajszczuk
- Children: 2
- Education: Medical University of Warsaw
- Profession: Cardiac surgeon, politician

Zbigniew Eugeniusz Religa (Polish: [ˈzbiɡɲɛf rɛˈliɡa]; 16 December 1938 – 8 March 2009) was a Polish cardiac surgeon and politician.

== Medical career ==
Religa finished his studies at the Medical University of Warsaw in 1963. From 1966 to 1980 he worked in the Szpital Wolski in Warsaw, where he qualified in surgery. In 1973, he visited New York City to train in vascular surgery, and in 1975 he trained in cardiac surgery in Detroit. In 1973, he obtained a Ph.D. degree; in 1981 he finished his habilitation, achieving academic recognition similar to an associate professor or senior lecturer. From 1980 to 1984, Religa lectured at the Warsaw Institute of Cardiology. In 1984 he obtained a chair in cardiac surgery and directed the Cardiosurgical Clinic in Zabrze, in 1990 he became full professor at the Silesian Medical University in Katowice, being its rector from 1997 to 1999. In 2001 he returned to Warsaw to become director of both the Clinic of Cardiac Surgery No. 2 and the Institute of Cardiology.

A pioneer in human heart transplantation in Poland, he led the team that performed the first successful heart transplantation in the country, and in June 1995 he was the first surgeon to graft an artificial valve created from materials taken from human corpses. In 2004, a team led by Religa obtained a prestigious Brussels Eureka award at the World Exhibition of Innovation, Research and Technology for developing an implantable pump for a pneumatic heart assistance system.

Religa held honorary doctorates from the Medical University of Lviv, the Silesian Medical University in Katowice, and the Medical University of Białystok.

The first successful heart transplant in Poland was performed on 5 November 1985. The famous heart transplant (photographed by James Stanfield) was in 1987. The patient was Tadeusz Żytkiewicz, who died in 2017 – 30 years after the operation, outliving the surgeon who gave him a new heart. The surgery lasted for 23 hours. After the surgery, an American photographer, James Stanfield from National Geographic, captured the photograph of Religa monitoring his patient's vitals on medical equipment with one of his colleagues, Dr. Romuald Cichoń, who assisted him during the surgery, asleep in the corner. According to one of Religa's closest associates, Marian Zembala, the photo doesn't show Żytkiewicz. They analyzed the photo and surgery plan and established that Żytkiewicz's surgery took place two hours later in different operating room. The patient in the photo died during transplantation. However, this has been contested by Religa himself as well as by Katarzyna Ludwiniak, Żytkiewicz's granddaughter, who recognizes her grandfather on the photo.

== Career in politics ==
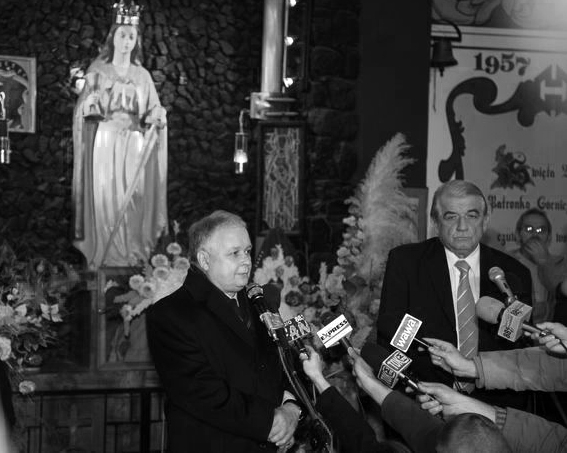
Lech Kaczyński and Zbigniew Religa at the Halemba coal mine in Ruda Śląska (22 November 2006).

Parallel to his work as a doctor, Religa pursued a career in politics. In 1993, he became a member of the Polish senate and was re-elected in 2001. As the centre and right wing of the Polish political landscape has been in constant flux ever since democracy was reinstated, Religa was a member of several parties and organizations. In 1993, he co-founded the Nonpartisan Bloc for Support of Reforms (BBWR) which gathered behind president Lech Wałęsa and was its leader in 1994. In 1995, Religa became the chairman of the short-lived party "The Republicans" (Republikanie) founded by renegade BBWR members who refused to back Wałęsa in the presidential elections of 1995. However, Religa refused to run for president himself, and the Republicans eventually disintegrated when they failed to enter the Sejm in 1997. Spanning the centre and centre-right of Polish politics, Religa was well placed to play a significant role in the newly created Conservative People's Party (SKL), which became part of the Solidarity Electoral Action (AWS) in 1997. In 2004, Religa was involved in founding the new Centrum Party and was elected to the position of honorary chairman.

Religa was considered a promising candidate in the 2005 Polish presidential elections. In his campaigning, Religa drove on his reputation and image as a successful physician, in January 2005, polls indicated support of more than 65%; in March 2005, with 17%, polls showed him ranking second behind Lech Kaczyński (19%) however as the elections neared he continued to lose support to professional politicians, ending up with only 6% votes in August. On September 2 in a move that gained him great respect in the Polish society, Religa pulled out of the presidential race urging his remaining supporters to vote for Donald Tusk from the Civic Platform.

Religa was Minister of Health of Poland in cabinets of Kazimierz Marcinkiewicz and Jarosław Kaczyński.

== Personal life and death ==
Religa met his wife, Anna Wajszczuk-Religa (1939 – 2025), when they were in the same study group during their second year in medical school. They got married in 1963 in Siedlce, the bride's hometown. They had two children together, Małgorzata (Margaret) and Grzegorz (Gregory).

Religa was an atheist.

Religa was a heavy smoker, and died from lung cancer, diagnosed in 2007.

== Legacy ==
A movie, Bogowie (Gods), was made about Religa in 2014 by Polish film director, Lukasz Palkowski, where Religa is portrayed by Tomasz Kot.

== Awards and decorations ==
- Order of the White Eagle (2008)
- Grand Cross of the Order of Polonia Restituta (1998)
- Commander's Cross with Star of the Order of Polonia Restituta (1995)
- Order of the Smile
