= Jerzy Kropiwnicki =

Polish politician (born 1945)

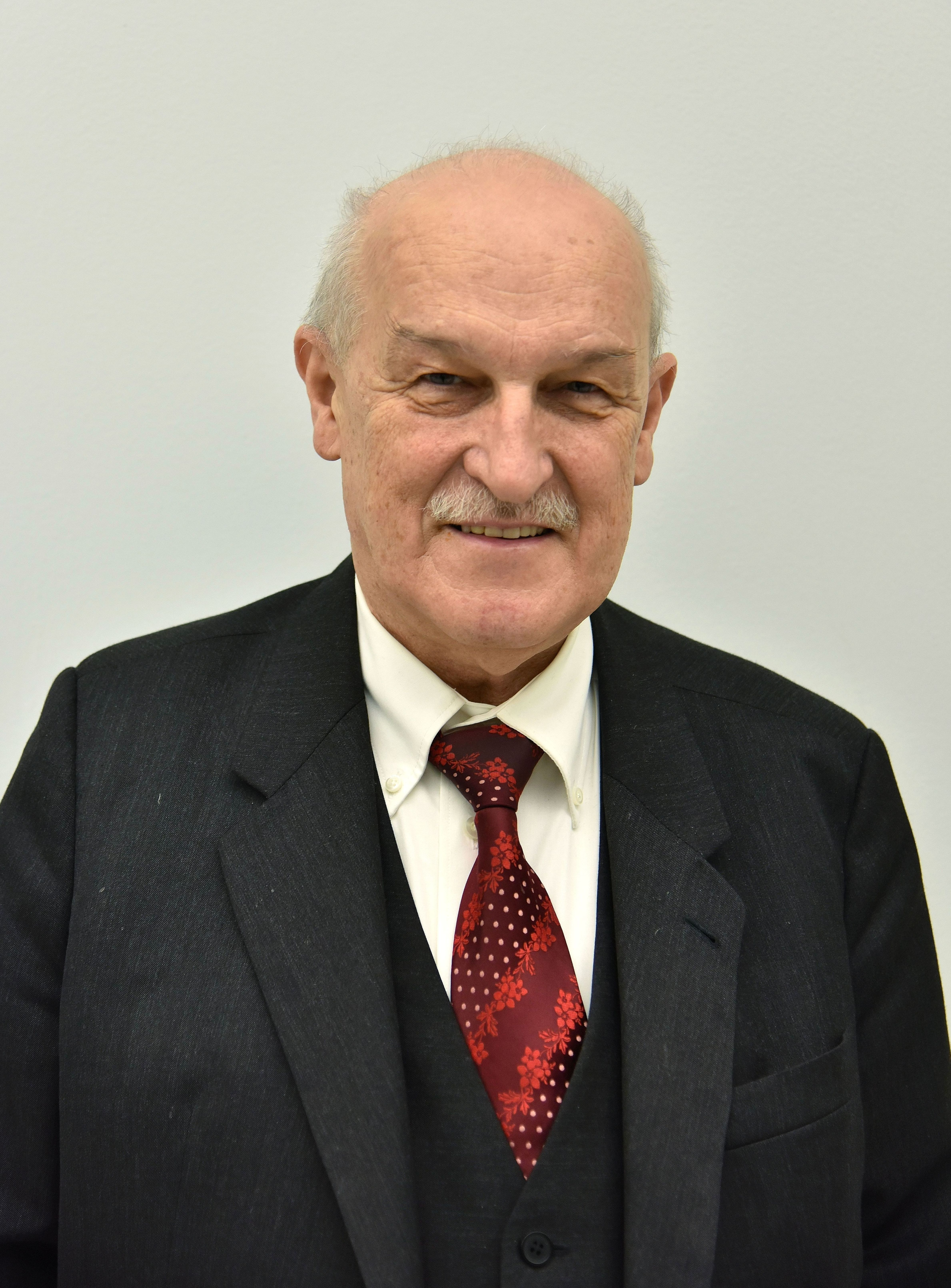
- Jerzy Kropiwnicki

Ministry of Labour and Social Policy
- In office 23 December 1991 – 5 June 1992
- Prime Minister: Jan Olszewski
- Preceded by: Michał Boni
- Succeeded by: Jacek Kuroń

Personal details
- Born: 5 July 1945 (age 81) Częstochowa, Poland
- Party: Christian National Union
- Education: Warsaw School of Economics

Jerzy Janusz Kropiwnicki (born 5 July 1945 in Częstochowa) is a Polish right-wing politician, member of Law and Justice party.

He was leader of small party Christian-National Union (Zjednoczenie Chrześcijańsko-Narodowe, ZChN). He was a president of the city of Łódź from 2002 until 2010.

In 2003 he banned "Parade of Freedom" (techno music festival) in the city (which was taking place between 1997 and 2003).

In November 2006 he was reelected for the office of president of the city of Łódź, but was ousted by referendum in January 2010, in which 96 percent of voters (turnout 22.2 percent) voted against him (parties in favour of Kropiwnicki advised their supporters to boycott the referendum in an effort to bust quorum).
