= Centre Party (Poland) =

Political party in Poland (2004–2008)

Centre Party Partia Centrum
- Abbreviation: Centrum
- Chairperson: Zbigniew Religa (2004); Janusz Steinhoff (2004–2008)
- Founded: April 3, 2004
- Dissolved: September 2, 2008; 18 years ago
- Headquarters: Plac Jana Henryka Dąbrowskiego 5, 00-057 Warszaw, Poland
- Ideology: Christian democracy
- Political position: Centre
- Colors: White; Azure

Partia Centrum (English: Centre Party) was a centrist, moderately conservative political party in Poland. Established on 3 April 2004, its founding declaration proclaimed a "necessity to take immediate steps towards repairing the state and to radically change the style of politics." The party's platform could be described as centrist with evident references to the tradition of Solidarity and Catholic social teaching.

The party's founding members and leadership were mostly from the ranks of the defunct party Solidarity Electoral Action (AWS), which held the government between 1997 and 2001, and other conservative to centrist groups, with some coming from the more liberal Freedom Union (UW).

Although nominally led by Janusz Steinhoff, formerly minister of economic affairs in the government of Jerzy Buzek, the main figurehead of the party was its honorary chairman and presidential candidate, senator Zbigniew Religa. Religa was leading in opinion polls until July but he withdrew on September 2 and asked his supporters to vote for the liberal Donald Tusk, his party did not enter the Sejm in the 2005 early elections with its poll results not exceeding 5%.

The party was deregistered in 2008 after not filing its 2007 financial statements.
