= Zbigniew Kuźmiuk =

Polish politician (born 1956)

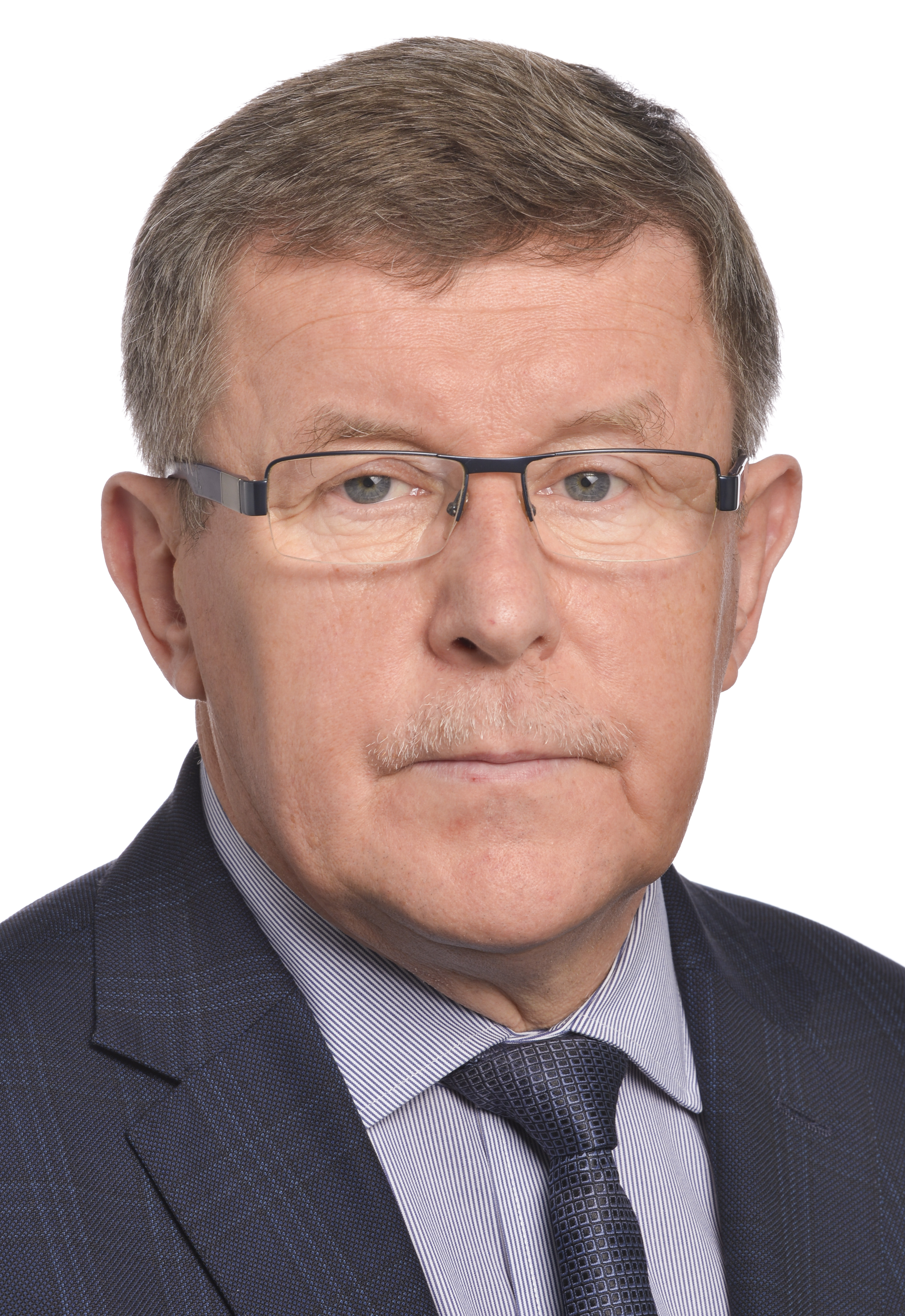

Member of the European Parliament for Masovia
- In office 1 July 2014 – 29 November 2023
- In office 20 July 2004 – 13 July 2009

Member of the Sejm
- In office 19 October 2001 – 16 June 2004
- In office 8 November 2011 – 27 May 2014
- Constituency: 17 – Radom

1st Marshal of Masovian Voivodeship
- In office 1 January 1999 – 17 October 2001
- Succeeded by: Adam Struzik

Personal details
- Born: 19 September 1956 (age 70) Komorowo, Poland
- Party: United People's Party (1986–1989); Polish People's Party (1989–2006); Law and Justice (2009–)
- Spouse: Danuta Kuźmiuk
- Children: 3 (two sons and a daughter)
- Education: Kielce University of Technology; Kazimierz Pułaski University; Warsaw School of Economics
- Awards: Order of Polonia Restituta
- Website: zbigniewkuzmiuk.pl

Zbigniew Krzysztof Kuźmiuk (born 19 September 1956 in Komorowo) is a Polish politician. He was a Member of the European Parliament (MEP) for Masovian Voivodeship with the Law and Justice party from 2004 to 2009, and again between 2014 and 2023. He was a member of the European Conservatives and Reformists and sat on the European Parliament's Committee on Budgets. Prior to 2006, Kuźmiuk was a leading member of the Polish People's Party.

Kuźmiuk was a substitute for the Committee on Economic and Monetary Affairs and a member of the Delegation to the EU-Bulgaria Joint Parliamentary Committee. He resigned from the European Parliament in 2023 and was replaced by Rafał Romanowski.

== Education ==
- 1989: Master of Economics, Kielce University of Technology (1979), Doctor of Economics Warsaw School of Planning and Statistics (now the Warsaw School of Economics)
- Lecturer at the Radom Polytechnic (since 1979), chairman of the production-service-trading company (PPHU) Teks SA

== Career ==
- 1990–94: and director PPHU Bakumar SA
- 1994–96: Voivode of Radom
- 1997: Minister, member of the Cabinet, Chairman of the State Centre for Strategic Studies
- 1998–2001: Councillor of the Masovian Voivodeship, Marshal of the Masovian Voivodeship
- 2001–04: Member of Parliament of the Republic of Poland, Chairman of the Parliamentary Committee on Local Self-Government and Regional Policy, Chairman of the Polish People's Party (PSL) parliamentary party
- 2003: Vice-Chairman of the Chief Executive Committee of the PSL (since March 2004), Vice-Chairman of the Masovian Voivodship Association of the PSL (since October

== Decorations ==
- Knight's Cross of the Order of Poland Reborn

== See also ==
- 2004 European Parliament election in Poland
