= Opinion polling for the 2023 Polish parliamentary election =

In the run up to the 2023 Polish parliamentary election, various organisations carried out opinion polling to gauge voting intention in Poland. Results of such polls are displayed in this article. The date range for these opinion polls are from the previous parliamentary election, held on 13 October 2019, to the day of the election, held on 15 October 2023.

To be represented in parliament electoral committees which are registered as political parties must reach an electoral threshold of 5% and those registered as coalitions must reach 8%. For the 2023 election Civic Coalition and Third Way were registered as coalitions.

== Graphical summary ==
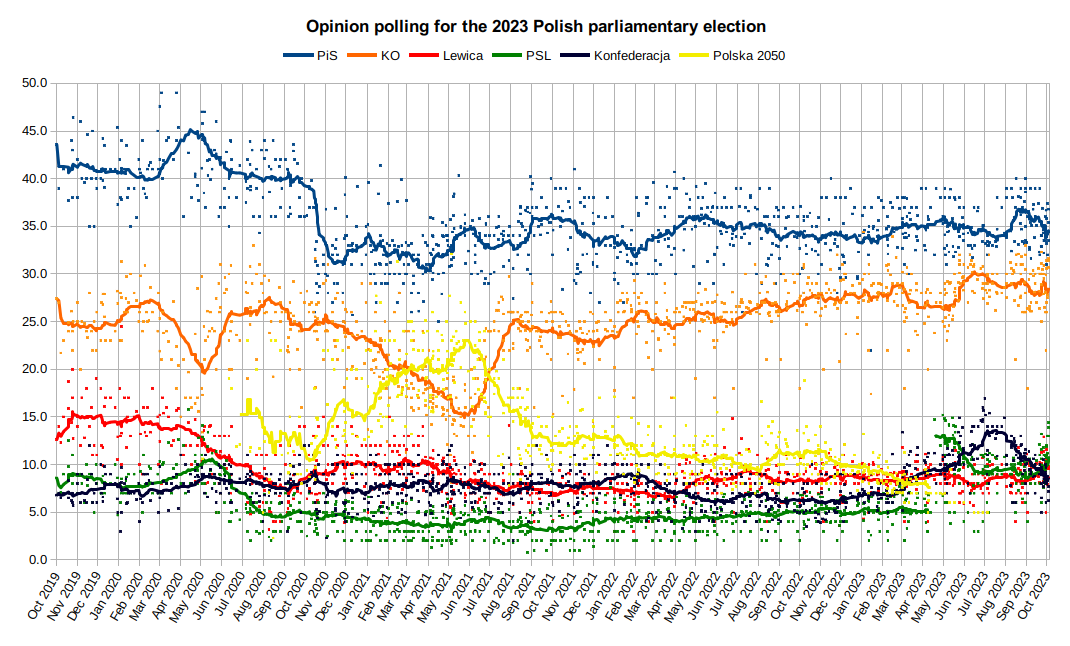

== Poll results ==
Poll results are listed in the tables below in reverse chronological order, showing the most recent first, and using the date the survey's fieldwork was done, as opposed to the date of publication. If such date is unknown, the date of publication is given instead. The highest percentage figure in each polling survey is displayed in bold, and the background shaded in the leading party's colour. In the instance that there is a tie, then no figure is shaded. The lead column on the right shows the percentage-point difference between the two parties with the highest figures. When a specific poll does not show a data figure for a party, the party's cell corresponding to that poll is shown empty.

Parties are denoted with en dashes if no indication is given of their level in polls.

=== Electoral alliances ===
Exit poll

Polling firm/Link	Fieldwork date	Sample size	United Right	Civic Coalition	The Left	Third Way		Confederation	Nonpartisan Local Gov. Activists	There is One Poland	Others	Don't know	Lead
Polling firm/Link	Fieldwork date	Sample size	United Right	Civic Coalition	The Left	Polish Coalition	Poland 2050	Confederation	Nonpartisan Local Gov. Activists	There is One Poland	Others	Don't know	Lead
Parliamentary election	15 Oct	21,596,674	35.38	30.70	8.61	14.40		7.16	1.86	1.63	0.22		4.68
OGB	15 Oct		33.5	31.4	9.8	13.9		7.7	2.2	1.3	0.2		2.1
IPSOS	15 Oct	90,000	36.8	31.6	8.6	13.0		6.2	2.4	1.2	0.2		5.2
Opinia24 / "GW"	12–13 Oct	1,500	32.0	27.5	7.9	11.2		8.8	3.9		0.6	8.1	4.5
IBSP / Stan Polityki	11–13 Oct	1,100	37.36	27.77	10.33	13.02		8.29	2.19	1.04	0.20		9.59
PGB Opinium	11–12 Oct	1,100	33.2	30.6	11.6	11.9		8.5	3.1		1.1		2.6
Pollster / SE.pl	11–12 Oct	?	35.81	31.38	10.48	10.71		8.72	1.49	0.90	0.51		4.43
IBRiS / "Wydarzenia" Polsat	10–12 Oct	1,243	33.9	27.0	9.7	11.0		8.2	2.3		0.5	7.5	6.9
Kantar / TVN	10–12 Oct	1,702	31	26	11	12		8	3		1	8	5
Estymator / DoRzeczy.pl	10–11 Oct	1,095	36.7	29.9	9.7	10.1		9.7	2.7		1.2		6.8
IBRiS / Onet	10–11 Oct	1,000	34.9	28.1	10.0	10.3		8.3	1.4	0.4		6.6	6.8
CBOS	2–11 Oct	1,110	35	22	5	6		6	2			17	13
IBRiS / RMF, "Rz"	9–10 Oct	1,100	33.5	28.0	10.1	10.9		9.2	0.9		0.4	7.0	5.5
Social Changes / wPolityce.pl	9–10 Oct	1,094	34	26	9	11		10	2		1	7	8
United Surveys / WP.pl	8–10 Oct	1,000	33.8	28.1	10.2	9.4		8.4	1.9	0.4		7.8	5.7
IPSOS / OKO.press, TOK FM	6–10 Oct	1,000	36	28	8	8		9	2		1	9	8
Research Partner	6–9 Oct	1,084	35.1	26.5	8.7	8.3		8.8	2.6		0.9	9.1	8.6
IPC / tuwroclaw.com	7–8 Oct	1,067	32.2	29.5	8.9	9.7		8.1	5.3	0.2		6.1	2.7
ewybory.eu	7 Sep–8 Oct	10,007	33.45	30.85	12.88	11.03		8.50	1.91	0.85	0.53 (Note: PL!SP – 0.22, MN – 0.18, RDiP – 0.11, NK – 0.02, AP – 0.00, RNP – 0.00)		2.60
Pollster / SE.pl	6–7 Oct	1,022	34.34	30.00	8.23	11.76		10.51	1.57	0.89	2.70		4.34
IBRiS / "Wydarzenia" Polsat	5–7 Oct	1,000	34.6	27.9	11.4	7.6		7.7	1.8	0.8	0.1	8.1	6.7
Estymator / DoRzeczy.pl	5–6 Oct	1,060	36.9	30.5	9.3	9.4		9.3	3.4		1.2		6.4
Opinia24 / "GW"	3–4 Oct	1,000	30	25	9	6		5	2		22		5
Opinia24 / "GW"	3–4 Oct	1,000	32.9	31.1	11.3	13.2		6.5	3.6		–		1.8
IBRiS / Onet	3–4 Oct	1,000	34.0	28.9	10.0	10.6		9.7	1.6	0.4		4.8	5.1
PGB Opinium	3–4 Oct	1,042	32.9	32.3	10.1	11.6		8.9	3.3		0.9		0.6
Kantar / TVN	2–4 Oct	1,500	34	30	10	9		8	2		2	5	4
United Surveys / DGP, RMF	2 Oct	1,000	32.0	28.2	10.2	11.0		10.0	3.5	0.0		5.1	3.8
Social Changes / wPolityce.pl	29 Sep–2 Oct	1,073	39	30	9	8		10	2		2		9
United Surveys / WP.pl	30 Sep–1 Oct	1,000	32.3	26.4	8.1	12.1		9.0	3.6	0.0		8.5	5.9
Estymator / DoRzeczy.pl	29–30 Sep	1,051	37.4	30.6	8.7	9.6		9.6	3.6		0.5		6.8
IBRiS / Onet	27 Sep	1,000	35.1	27.0	10.1	10.4		9.5	2.0	0.3		5.6	8.1
Social Changes / wPolityce.pl	22–25 Sep	1,052	39	30	9	9		10	2		1		9
Social Changes / wPolityce.pl	22–25 Sep	1,052	39	29	10	3	7	11			1		10
IPSOS / OKO.press, TOK FM	22–25 Sep	1,000	36	29	10	8		7	1		0	9	7
United Surveys / WP.pl	22–24 Sep	1,000	33.8	28.1	8.7	9.0		8.8	3.6	0.1		7.9	5.7
Estymator / DoRzeczy.pl	22–23 Sep	1,054	37.3	29.8	8.5	9.9		10.6	3.7		0.2		7.5
Pollster / SE.pl	21–22 Sep	1,015	36.76	30.44	9.72	9.81		8.67	1.27	1.58	1.75		6.32
IBRiS / Onet	20 Sep	1,000	35.1	26.1	9.1	9.2		9.9	1.4	0.2		9.0	9.0
United Surveys / DGP, RMF	18–19 Sep	1,000	31.6	27.0	9.8	10.1		9.3	3.5	0.0		8.7	4.6
Research Partner	15–18 Sep	1,065	35.4	26.1	8.0	10.1		9.5	1.7		1.7	7.6	9.3
Social Changes / wPolityce.pl	15–18 Sep	1,046	39	30	10	8		9	2		2		9
United Surveys / WP.pl	16–17 Sep	1,000	32.8	26.3	10.2	10.6		9.5	3.4			7.2	6.5
IBRiS / "Wydarzenia" Polsat	15–17 Sep	1,000	32.6	26.6	9.9	10.6		9.5	1.5	0.0		9.2	6.0
Estymator / DoRzeczy.pl	15–16 Sep	1,069	36.6	29.4	9.0	9.4		11.4	3.6		0.6		7.2
CBOS	4–14 Sep	1,073	36	18	5	4		7	2	1		23	18
IBRiS / Onet	13 Sep	1,000	33.3	26.4	11.1	10.2		10.1	1.0			7.9	6.9
United Surveys / WP.pl	11 Sep	1,000	33.5	28.0	8.9	9.2		11.2	3.2			6.0	5.5
Social Changes / wPolityce.pl	8–11 Sep	1,038	39	32	7	9		10	2		1		7
Social Changes / wPolityce.pl	8–11 Sep	1,038	40	33	7	4	5	10			1		7
IPSOS / OKO.press, TOK FM	8–11 Sep	1,000	35	26	8	6		8	1		1	14	9
IBSP / Stan Polityki	7–11 Sep	1,000	38.58	30.51	8.48	8.67		11.57	1.99		0.20		8.07
IBRiS / "Rz"	8–9 Sep	1,100	33.2	26.0	10.1	10.3		9.4	2.0			9.0	7.2
Estymator / DoRzeczy.pl	8–9 Sep	1,075	37.6	29.1	8.9	9.8		11.2	3.1		0.3		8.5
Opinia24	5–6 Sep	655	33.4	26.0	7.6	6.4		10.4				15.7	7.4
Kantar / TVN	5–6 Sep	732	37	31	6	8		9			2	7	6

=== 2023 ===
Polling firm/Link	Fieldwork date	Sample size	United Right	Kukiz'15	Civic Coalition	AGROunia	Third Way			Confederation	The Left	Independents & Local Gov. Activists	Others / Don't know	Lead
Polling firm/Link	Fieldwork date	Sample size	United Right	Kukiz'15	Civic Coalition	AGROunia	Agreement	Polish Coalition	Poland 2050	Confederation	The Left	Independents & Local Gov. Activists	Others / Don't know	Lead
	6 Sep	**Deadline for electoral committees to deliver lists of candidates.**												
PGB Opinium	4–5 Sep	1,030	**34.7**		31.8		8.5			12.1	10.0	2.1	0.8	2.9
Social Changes / wPolityce.pl	1–4 Sep	1,049	**39**		30		5		5	13	7		1	9
Social Changes / wPolityce.pl	1–4 Sep	1,049	**38**		31		10			12	8		1	7
Research Partner	1–4 Sep	1,064	**36.2**		27.7		10.5			10.4	8.2		7.0	8.5
United Surveys / WP.pl	1–3 Sep	1,000	**35.3**		27.5		10.2			10.6	9.4		7.0	7.8
	31 Aug	**Law and Justice announces Paweł Kukiz as the main candidate on the party's list in the Opole district**												
IBRiS / Onet	30–31 Aug	1,000	**33.1**		26.7		10.1			11.4	9.6		9.1	6.4
Mands / Wiadomości TVP	29–31 Aug	750	**38.1**		32.1		7.3			10.7	11.8		–	6.0
Social Changes / wPolityce.pl	25–28 Aug	1,040	**40**	1	31		1	3	4	11	7		2	9
Social Changes / wPolityce.pl	25–28 Aug	1,040	**40**	1	32		0	6		12	8		1	8
CBOS	14–27 Aug	1,024	**37**		21		5			6	4		24	16
IBRiS / "Rz"	25–26 Aug	1,100	**33.4**		27.2		10.0			12.4	9.3		7.7	6.2
Estymator / DoRzeczy.pl	24–25 Aug	1,022	**35.9**		30.2		10.4			12.7	8.7		2.1	5.7
Pollster / SE.pl	23–24 Aug	1,038	**35.59**		30.35		10.71			10.40	8.89	0.90	3.16 (Note: Yes! For Poland – 0.70)	5.24
Kantar Public	18–23 Aug	983	**38**		30		6			6	8		12	8
Social Changes / wPolityce.pl	18–21 Aug	1,062	**39**	1	29		1	8		12	8		2	10
Social Changes / wPolityce.pl	18–21 Aug	1,062	**39**	1	29		1	4	5	13	7		1	10
IBRiS / "Wydarzenia" Polsat	18–21 Aug		**32.4**		30.6		9.0			11.8	7.7		8.5	1.8
United Surveys / WP.pl	18–20 Aug	1,000	**34.5**		31.2		9.0			7.8	7.1		10.4	3.3
	16 Aug	**Civic Coalition and AGROunia announce joint start in the election**												
Social Changes / wPolityce.pl	11–14 Aug	1,052	**38**	1	30		1	9		11	9		1	8
Social Changes / wPolityce.pl	11–14 Aug	1,052	**39**	1	29		0	5	6	10	9		1	10
Research Partner	11–14 Aug	1,055	**33.8**	1.0	27.5	0.6	0.3	10.6		10.9	7.7		7.6	6.3
Estymator / DoRzeczy.pl	10–11 Aug	1,017	**34.3**		28.6		10.8			14.9	9.0		2.4	5.7
	8 Aug	**President Andrzej Duda chooses 15 October 2023 as the election date**												
Social Changes / wPolityce.pl	4–7 Aug	1,073	**37**	1	28		1	3	5	14	10		1	9
Social Changes / wPolityce.pl	28–31 Jul	1,074	**38**	1	28		1	3	5	14	8		2	10
Social Changes / wPolityce.pl	28–31 Jul	1,074	**38**	1	30		1	6		14	9		2	8
Research Partner	28–31 Jul	1,092	**34.7**	1.0	27.9	0.3	0.2	9.3		10.9	8.8		6.7	6.8
United Surveys / WP.pl	29–30 Jul	1,000	**32.9**		28.1	0.6	10.6			13.2	8.8		5.8	4.8
IBRiS / "Rz"	28–29 Jul	1,100	**33.4**		26.2		10.8			12.7	10.7	2.0	4.2	7.2
Social Changes / wPolityce.pl	21–24 Jul	1,046	**34**	1	29		1	5	5	14	9		2	5
Social Changes / wPolityce.pl	21–24 Jul	1,046	**33**	1	30		1	8		14	10		2	3
	20 Jul	**Agreement joins the Polish Coalition**												
Estymator / DoRzeczy.pl	19–20 Jul	1,002	**34.3**		28.3			11.2		15.4	8.5		2.3	6.0
IBRiS / Onet	19–20 Jul	1,000	**33.3**		27.6			10.3		13.0	9.9		5.9	5.7
Kantar Public	14–19 Jul	983	**33**		32	1	1	5		8	7		13	1
Pollster / SE.pl	17 Jul (Note: Publication date)	–	**33.40**		29.77	1.52		10.54		11.46	8.91	1.10	3.30 (Note: Yes! For Poland – 1.03)	3.63
Social Changes / wPolityce.pl	14–17 Jul	1,056	**34**	1	29		1	5	5	14	9		2	5
Social Changes / wPolityce.pl	14–17 Jul	1,056	**33**	1	30		1	8		14	10	1	2	3
Research Partner	14–17 Jul	1,084	**32.0**	1.2	26.9	0.7	0.6	9.8		11.0	7.5		10.3	5.1
CBOS	3–16 Jul	1,004	**29**		28	1		6		9	5		19	1
IBRiS / "Wydarzenia" Polsat	13–14 Jul	998	**33.2**		28.3			11.1		15.2	8.1		4.1	4.9
PGB Opinium	11–13 Jul	1,000	**34.6**		29.0			9.8		16.9	8.6	0.5	0.7	5.6
IBRiS / ZET	10–11 Jul	1,000	**35.1**		27.4	0.0		10.8		15.7	9.4		1.6	7.7
Social Changes / wPolityce.pl	7–10 Jul	1,076	**35**	1	29		1	4	5	16	7		2	6
IBSP / Stan Polityki	6–10 Jul	800	**35.05**		30.78			9.45		14.74	8.89	0.82	0.27	4.27
United Surveys / WP.pl	7–9 Jul	1,000	**33.4**		28.5	1.1		11.0		14.5	10.7		0.8	4.9
Estymator / DoRzeczy.pl	5–7 Jul	1,043	**34.5**		30.6			11.0		14.6	7.5		1.8	3.9
Social Changes / wPolityce.pl	30 Jun–3 Jul	1,093	**37**	1	30		0	3	5	14	9		1	7
Social Changes / wPolityce.pl	30 Jun–3 Jul	1,093	**37**	1	30		0	8		14	9		1	7
Pollster / SE.pl	30 Jun–2 Jul	1,042	**36.6**	0.7	29.4	2.0	1.5	9.3		10.6	8.0	0.5	0.9 (Note: Yes! For Poland – 0.3)	7.2
IPSOS / DoRzeczy.pl	26–28 Jun	1,000	**33**		28	2		9		12	10		6	5
Social Changes / wPolityce.pl	23–27 Jun	1,072	**37**	1	31		0	3	5	14	8		1	6
Social Changes / wPolityce.pl	23–27 Jun	1,072	**37**	1	31		1	7		14	8		1	6
Kantar Public / "GW"	26 Jun	1,000	**34.4**		30.8	1.8	0.8	7.8		10.5	5.7		8.2	3.6
United Surveys / WP.pl	23–25 Jun	1,000	**31.7**		28.2	0.7		12.1		14.0	8.0		5.3	3.5
IBRiS / "Rz"	23–24 Jun	1,000	**32.7**		30.2	0.3		10.8		12.1	9.0		4.9	2.5
Estymator / DoRzeczy.pl	22–23 Jun	1,052	**34.9**		31.4			10.5		13.5	7.3		2.4	3.5
IPSOS / OKO.press, TOK FM	19–22 Jun	1,000	**33**		31	2		7		12	8		7	2
Kantar Public	16–21 Jun	978	**32**		**32**	1		7		7	6		15	Tie
Pollster / SE.pl	16–18 Jun	1,024	**34.3**	0.7	30.7	1.8	0.1	9.8		11.0	7.8	0.7	3.0 (Note: Yes! For Poland – 1.5)	3.6
CBOS	5–18 Jun	1,054	**33**		27	1		5		8	5		18 (Note: Wolnościowcy – 1)	6
Social Changes / wPolityce.pl	9–12 Jun	1,030	**37**	1	31		1	4	6	10	8		2	6
Research Partner	9–12 Jun	1,039	**34.9**	1.7	29.1	0.6	0.3	10.7		11.5	5.9		5.2	5.8
United Surveys / WP.pl	9–11 Jun	1,000	**34.2**		29.7	0.1		10.2		11.5	9.7		4.6	4.5
IBRiS / "Wydarzenia" Polsat	6–11 Jun	1,000	**33.5**		28.3	0.3		10.6		11.7	9.7		5.8	5.2
Estymator / DoRzeczy.pl	9–10 Jun	1,043	**35.9**		29.6			11.0		13.9	7.2		2.4	6.3
IPSOS / DoRzeczy.pl	5–7 Jun	1,000	**35**		29	2		10		13	7		4	6
IBRiS / Onet	6 Jun	1,100	**33.9**		30.1			10.1		12.3	8.8		4.8	3.8
Kantar / TVN	5–6 Jun	1,003	31		**32**	2	0	10		10	6		9	1
PGB Opinium	4–6 Jun	1,000	**33.9**		31.4			9.5		14.9	8.0	1.5	0.8	2.5
Social Changes / wPolityce.pl	2–5 Jun	1,049	**38**	1	31		0	4	6	11	7		2	7
Social Changes / wPolityce.pl	2–5 Jun	1,049	**37**	1	31		2	8		11	8		2	6
IBRiS / ZET	4 Jun	1,000	**34.4**		29.1	0.2		9.4		13.4	8.6		4.9	5.3
United Surveys / DGP, RMF	2–4 Jun	1,000	**32.8**		27.2	0.4		11.3		10.8	8.7		8.8	5.6
Pollster / SE.pl	30–31 May	1,006	**32.29**	0.41	27.72	1.65	0.51	13.96		9.78	11.51	0.83	1.34 (Note: Yes! For Poland – 0.54)	4.57
CBM Indicator / TVP	29–30 May	1,000	**37.8**		28.5			13.4		10.1	10.2			9.3
	29 May	**Sejm votes to pass and President Andrzej Duda signs "Russian influence bill"**												
Social Changes / wPolityce.pl	26–29 May	1,038	**38**	1	30		0	5	6	10	8		2	8
Social Changes / wPolityce.pl	26–29 May	1,038	**38**	1	30		2	9		10	8		2	8
Research Partner	26–29 May	1,045	**34.8**	0.9	28.1	0.9	0.4	11.8		9.5	8.3		5.2	6.7
United Surveys / WP.pl	26–28 May	1,000	**31.8**		26.6	1.2		14.1		10.1	10.0		6.2	5.2
IBRiS / "Rz"	26–27 May	1,000	**32.9**		25.6	0.6		13.1		11.0	7.8	1.8	7.2	7.3
Estymator / DoRzeczy.pl	25–26 May	1,055	**35.8**		25.2			14.9		11.5	9.5		3.1	10.6
	23 May	**AGROunia and Agreement end their cooperation**												
Mands / Wiadomości TVP	20–23 May	1,011	**38.9**		29.1			3.8	9.5	10.0	8.8		–	9.8
Social Changes / wPolityce.pl	19–22 May	2,099	**38**	1	29		0	5	6	11	8		2	9
United Surveys / DGP, RMF	19–21 May	1,000	**32.3**		25.7			14.1		9.9	9.7		8.3	6.6
IBRiS / "Wydarzenia" Polsat	19–21 May	1,020	**34.5**		24.6			14.2		11.1	9.3		6.3	9.9
PGB Opinium	16–19 May	1,100	**34.36**		29.15	0.49		12.70		11.73	8.47	2.44	0.65	5.21
IPSOS / DoRzeczy.pl	16–19 May	1,000	**35**		24	2		12		11	9		7	11
CBOS	8–18 May	1,056	**33**		23	1		6		8	6		20	10
Kantar Public	12–17 May	979	**31**		28	1		10		7	8		15	3
IBRiS / Onet	16 May	1,100	**32.0**		25.4			14.6		10.0	9.4		8.6	6.6
Pollster / SE.pl	15 May	1,083	**34.06**		27.79	1.58		12.42		10.75	10.01		3.39	6.27
Research Partner	12–15 May	1,053	**35.4**	0.5	28.4	1.1		12.2		8.5	8.4		5.5	7.0
Social Changes / wPolityce.pl	12–15 May	1,039	**39**	0	29		1	6	7	9	7		2	10
Social Changes / wPolityce.pl	12–15 May	1,039	**38**	1	29		1	11		10	8		2	9
United Surveys / WP.pl	12–14 May	1,000	**32.7**		24.5	1.0		14.8		9.4	10.0		7.6	8.2
Estymator / DoRzeczy.pl	11–12 May	1,070	**36.0**	1.4	26.5	0.2		6.7	6.9	11.0	10.8		0.5	9.5
Estymator / DoRzeczy.pl	11–12 May	1,070	**35.3**		25.0	0.2		15.2		10.5	10.4		0.2	10.3
Social Changes / wPolityce.pl	5–8 May	1,039	**38**	1	28		0	7	7	9	8		2	10
Social Changes / wPolityce.pl	5–8 May	1,039	**38**	1	27		1	12		10	9		2	11
Social Changes / wPolityce.pl	28 Apr–2 May	1,048	**39**	2	27		0	6	7	8	9		2	12
United Surveys / WP.pl	27–30 Apr	1,000	**32.0**		23.8	0.2		14.7		11.2	8.4		9.7	8.2
	27 Apr	**Polish People's Party and Poland 2050 announce joint election start as Third Way.**												
Social Changes / wPolityce.pl	21–24 Apr	1,048	**37**	2	28		1	5	7	9	10		1	9
Estymator / DoRzeczy.pl	20–21 Apr	1,059	**35.7**	1.0	25.5	0.2		6.8	6.2	11.2	9.7	3.5	0.2	10.2
CBOS	11–20 Apr	1,081	**36**	<1	20	1		3	5	9	4		23 (Note: Wolnościowcy – 1)	16
PGB Opinium	17–19 Apr	1,080	**34.89**		28.43	0.48		5.01	9.05	10.82	8.56	1.78	1.17	6.46
Kantar Public / "GW"	14–19 Apr	981	**35**		27	1		3	7	7	6		15	8
Social Changes / wPolityce.pl	14–17 Apr	1,036	**39**	2	28		0	5	7	7	10		2	11
Research Partner	14–17 Apr	1,047	**34.6**	1.4	28.1	1.1		3.9	7.1	8.8	9.1		5.8	6.5
Pollster / SE.pl	14–16 Apr	1,120	**32.47**	0.43	26.69		0.57	5.67	9.52	10.19	11.14	0.87	2.45 (Note: Yes! For Poland – 1.12)	5.78
IBRiS / "Rz"	14–15 Apr	1,100	**33.0**		24.8			6.4	8.0	10.4	9.4		8.0	8.2
Social Changes / wPolityce.pl	7–10 Apr	1,052	**39**	1	28		0	5	8	8	9		2	11
IBRiS / "Wydarzenia" Polsat	4–5 Apr	1,005	**33.5**		23.6	0.8		6.5	8.0	11.8	9.5		6.3	9.9
Estymator / DoRzeczy.pl	4–5 Apr	1,032	**36.1**	1.2	25.8	0.5		7.0	7.9	11.0	10.3		0.2	10.3
Social Changes / wPolityce.pl	31 Mar–3 Apr	1,047	**37**	1	29		0	5	7	8	11		2	8
Research Partner	31 Mar–3 Apr	1,052	**33.9**	1.4	28.3	1.1		5.0	8.4	8.1	7.4		6.5	5.6
United Surveys / WP.pl	31 Mar–2 Apr	1,000	**32.5**		24.0	0.0		5.9	8.7	9.6	10.3		9.0	8.5
Social Changes / wPolityce.pl	24–27 Mar	1,047	**37**	2	30		0	5	7	8	9		2	7
PGB Opinium	22–25 Mar	1,100	**35.72**		28.25	0.60		4.78	8.52	11.36	8.07	1.79	0.90	7.47
Estymator / DoRzeczy.pl	23–24 Mar	1,048	**36.4**	1.0	27.9	0.9		7.1	8.1	9.9	8.3		0.4	8.5
IPSOS / OKO.press, TOK FM	20–23 Mar	1,000	**34**		27	1		5	6	11	8		7	7
Kantar Public / "GW"	17–22 Mar	981	**30**	3	22	1		4	8	7	8		15	8
IBSP	18–20 Mar	1,000	**37.89**		30.65			3.26	8.44	9.96	7.67		2.13	7.24
Social Changes / wPolityce.pl	17–20 Mar	1,045	**36**	2	30		0	5	8	8	9		2	6
United Surveys / WP.pl	17–19 Mar	1,000	**33.8**		25.4	0.2		6.4	8.1	9.3	9.2		7.6	8.4
IBRiS / "Rz"	17–18 Mar	1,100	**34.3**		26.4			6.2	7.9	9.0	8.5		7.7	7.9
Kantar / TVN	14–16 Mar	1,000	**31**	2	26	1		2	9	9	6		13	5
IPSOS / DoRzeczy.pl	13–16 Mar	1,000	**37**		25	2		5	9	8	9		5	12
Pollster / SE.pl	16 Mar	–	**33.81**	1.00	28.36		0.22	4.53	11.27	9.70	9.30		1.81	5.45
CBOS	6–16 Mar	993	**38**		18	0		2	6	6	4		22 (Note: Wolnościowcy – 0)	20
IBRiS / Onet	13–14 Mar	1,100	**34.2**		26.7			6.8	7.1	8.7	9.2		7.3	7.5
Research Partner	10–13 Mar	1,013	**32.7**	0.9	28.0	2.0		5.5	7.6	5.2	9.3		8.9	4.7
Social Changes / wPolityce.pl	10–13 Mar	1,050	**38**	2	29		1	5	7	7	9		2	9
Kantar Public / "GW"	1–13 Mar	1,000	**29.4**		24.2			4.1	6.9	9.9	9.9		16.0	5.2
Estymator / DoRzeczy.pl	8–9 Mar	1,025	**36.9**	1.3	28.6	0.9		7.7	7.1	8.0	9.2		0.3	8.3
Social Changes / wPolityce.pl	3–6 Mar	1,045	**38**	1	29		0	7	8	7	9		1	9
Research Partner	3–6 Mar	1,054	**32.8**	1.3	26.7	1.3		5.3	8.1	7.1	8.8		8.6	6.1
United Surveys / WP.pl	3–5 Mar	1,000	**34.7**		27.9	0.9		6.9	7.1	7.3	8.2		7.0	6.8
PGB Opinium	2–4 Mar	1,100	**34.68**		31.69	0.45		4.93	9.12	8.52	7.92	1.94	0.75	2.99
IBRiS / ZET	28 Feb–1 Mar	1,100	**34.4**		27.1			6.6	7.5	7.4	9.2		7.8	7.3
Social Changes / wPolityce.pl	24–27 Feb	1,052	**37**	2	29		1	6	7	6	9		3	8
IBSP	24–27 Feb	1,000	**34.70**		33.91			3.73	7.33	11.13	6.74	2.08	0.38	0.79
Estymator / DoRzeczy.pl	23–24 Feb	1,037	**37.5**	1.1	29.9	0.7		6.6	8.0	6.8	9.1		0.3	7.6
Social Changes / wPolityce.pl	17–21 Feb	1,070	**35**	2	31		1	5	9	6	9		2	4
Research Partner	17–20 Feb	1,022	**32.1**	1.6	30.4		0.4	4.5	9.7	6.4	7.7		7.3	1.7
Kantar Public	15–20 Feb	–	**33**	2	28	0		2	9	5	9		12	5
United Surveys / WP.pl	17–19 Feb	1,000	**33.6**		27.2	0.4		7.0	7.5	6.9	8.7		8.7	6.4
CBOS	6–19 Feb	982	**36**	0	22	1		3	7	7	5		16	14
IBRiS / "Rz"	17–18 Feb	1,100	**34.7**		28.6			6.4	8.2	6.0	9.0		7.1	6.1
PGB Opinium	15–18 Feb	1,100	**34.80**		30.85	1.06		5.02	10.33	7.29	7.90	1.98	0.76	3.95
	13 February	**Wolnościowcy leave Confederation**												
Social Changes / wPolityce.pl	10–13 Feb	1,063	**37**	1	28		1	7	8	8	9		1	9
Estymator / DoRzeczy.pl	9–10 Feb	1,021	**37.7**	1.2	28.9	1.3		6.4	8.3	6.5	9.5		0.2	8.8
Kantar / TVN	7–8 Feb	1,000	28	2	**29**	2		3	11	8	5		12	1
	7 February	**AGROunia and Agreement announce their intention to merge into a joint political party.**												
Research Partner	3–6 Feb	1,040	**35.6**	0.9	28.1		0.4	5.4	9.8	7.5	7.2		5.1	7.5
Research Partner	3–6 Feb	1,040	**33.7**	1.9	27.8	1.0		4.2	10.7	6.4	7.3		6.9	5.9
Social Changes / wPolityce.pl	3–6 Feb	1,063	**38**	1	29		0	6	8	7	9		2	9
United Surveys / WP.pl	3–5 Feb	1,000	**34.6**		28.0	1.9		5.1	8.1	5.2	9.1		8.0	6.6
IBRiS / "Rz"	3–4 Feb	1,100	**33.9**		27.3			5.1	8.3	5.6	8.9		11.0	6.6
Social Changes / wPolityce.pl	27–30 Jan	1,083	**35**	2	29		0	5	9	7	10		3	6
Pollster / SE.pl	28–29 Jan	1,088	**34.76**	1.15	29.02		1.05	5.14	11.31	6.84	10.16		0.57	5.74
Estymator / DoRzeczy.pl	26–27 Jan	1,035	**37.0**	1.4	28.8			6.6	9.1	7.6	8.9		0.6	8.2
SW Research / "Rz"	24–26 Jan	1,071	**22.0**		17.4			2.6	9.1	9.0	7.1		32.8 (Note: Yes! For Poland – 10.7, others – 2.9, don't know – 19.2)	4.6
United Surveys / DGP, RMF	22–23 Jan	1,000	**34.0**		27.4			6.1	8.6	6.4	8.4		9.1	6.6
Social Changes / wPolityce.pl	20–23 Jan	1,053	**35**	1	30		1	5	9	7	10		2	5
Kantar Public	18–23 Jan	983	**31**	1	**31**	1	0	2	8	5	8		13	Tie
United Surveys / WP.pl	20–22 Jan	1,000	**34.4**		27.1	0.2		6.2	9.7	6.5	8.4		7.5	7.3
CBOS	9–22 Jan	1,028	**32**	1	22		1	3	7	7	5		22	10
Social Changes / wPolityce.pl	13–16 Jan	1,061	**37**	2	30		0	5	10	6	9		1	7
Research Partner	13–16 Jan	1,033	**34.6**	2.5	27.8		0.5	4.8	9.4	7.2	8.4		4.7	6.8
IBRiS / ZET	14–15 Jan	1,100	**33.4**		27.2			5.9	9.2	7.0	8.9		8.4	6.2
IBSP	10–15 Jan	800	34.25		**34.40**	1.24		4.13	13.20	8.45	4.33		0.0	0.15
Estymator / DoRzeczy.pl	12–13 Jan	1,029	**36.1**	1.6	29.4			6.7	8.2	7.4	10.1		0.3	6.7
Social Changes / wPolityce.pl	6–9 Jan	1,056	**34**	2	29		0	7	10	7	9		2	5
United Surveys / WP.pl	6–8 Jan	1,000	**32.3**		27.0	2.0		5.9	9.3	6.9	8.0		8.6	5.3
IBRiS / "Rz"	5–6 Jan	1,100	**29.7**		25.4			5.7	9.2	6.6	8.9		14.5	4.3
IBRiS / "Rz"	5–6 Jan	1,100	**29.5**		23.7			6.2	7.3	6.3	8.8	2.3	15.9 (Note: Yes! For Poland – 1.9)	5.8
Social Changes / wPolityce.pl	30 Dec–2 Jan	1,051	**37**	2	28		0	5	11	9	8		2	9

=== 2022 ===
Polling firm/Link	Fieldwork date	Sample size	United Right	Agreement	Civic Coalition	The Left	Polish Coalition	Kukiz'15	Confederation	Poland 2050	AGROunia	Others / Don't know	Lead
Estymator / DoRzeczy.pl	29–30 Dec	1,022	**36.3**		28.8	10.3	6.7	1.5	6.7	9.4		0.3	7.5
Social Changes / wPolityce.pl	23–27 Dec	1,054	**39**	1	28	9	5	1	7	9		1	11
IPSOS / OKO.press, TOK FM	19–21 Dec	1,000	**34**		27	9	4		6	10	1	9	7
IBRiS / ZET	19–20 Dec	1,100	**29.6**		23.7	8.2	6.1		5.5	9.9		17.0	5.9
Social Changes / wPolityce.pl	16–19 Dec	1,081	**38**	1	30	8	4	2	6	9		2	8
Pollster / SE.pl	17–18 Dec	–	**31.16**	0.13	29.95	12.08	5.21	1.02	7.90	12.09		0.46	1.21
United Surveys / WP.pl	16 Dec	1,000	**31.8**		27.4	9.4	6.4		4.0	10.0	0.9	10.1	4.4
Estymator / DoRzeczy.pl	15–16 Dec	1,039	**35.3**		29.4	11.0	6.7	1.8	6.1	9.2		0.5	5.9
Kantar / TVN	9–15 Dec	1,001	**32**	0	31	6	3	1	9	11	1	6	1
Research Partner	9–12 Dec	1,047	**29.6**	0.5	29.3	6.8	4.6	1.8	7.2	9.8		10.4	0.3
Social Changes / wPolityce.pl	9–12 Dec	1,076	**38**	1	27	8	4	2	9	10		1	11
CBOS	28 Nov–11 Dec	1,018	**30.6**		20.8	3.6	3.6		5.9	10.5		25.0	9.8
IBRiS / Onet	7–8 Dec	1,100	**32.9**		26.4	9.4	6.2		5.5	9.2		10.4	6.5
Kantar Public	2–7 Dec	970	28	1	**32**	10	2	1	5	9	1	11	4
Social Changes / wPolityce.pl	2–5 Dec	1,071	**38**	1	27	8	4	2	9	10		1	11
United Surveys / WP.pl	2–4 Dec	1,000	**33.6**		26.9	9.7	5.9		5.0	10.8	0.7	7.4	6.7
IBRiS / "Rz"	2–3 Dec	1,100	**34.2**		28.3	9.7	5.2		5.2	8.8		8.6	5.9
IBRiS / "Rz"	2–3 Dec	1,100	**33.2**		26.8	9.7	5.4		5.2	8.6		11.1 (Note: Nonpartisan Local Government Activists – 2.0)	6.4
Social Changes / wPolityce.pl	25–28 Nov	1,066	**40**	1	28	8	4	2	8	8		1	12
Pollster / SE.pl	25–27 Nov	1,057	**32.51**	0.75	30.45	10.84	3.87	0.92	8.65	11.56		0.45	2.06
Estymator / DoRzeczy.pl	24–25 Nov	1,041	**35.7**		28.4	11.2	7.4	1.5	5.1	10.4		0.3	7.3
IBRiS / ZET	20–21 Nov	1,100	**34.1**		28.0	9.2	5.6		4.9	10.2		8.0	6.1
Social Changes / wPolityce.pl	18–21 Nov	1,067	**38**	1	29	9	4	1	9	8		1	9
United Surveys / WP.pl	18–20 Nov	1,000	**33.2**		26.6	8.9	5.0		4.2	12.3	0.7	9.1	6.6
CBOS	7–17 Nov	1,038	**34**		20	4	3	1	6	10		19	14
IBRiS / Onet	14–15 Nov	1,100	**33.8**		27.6	10.1	6.6		4.3	9.6		8.0	6.2
Research Partner	11–14 Nov	1,079	**31.0**	0.8	26.4	7.5	5.8	1.3	7.1	10.5		9.6	4.6
Social Changes / wPolityce.pl	11–14 Nov	1,075	**38**	1	28	7	6	2	9	8		1	10
United Surveys / DGP, RMF	10–12 Nov	1,000	**33.6**		25.6	9.3	6.6		3.9	14.0		7.0	8.0
Estymator/ DoRzeczy.pl	9–10 Nov	1,055	**35.9**		27.7	11.2	6.9	1.4	4.8	11.6		0.5	8.2
IPSOS / OKO.press	7–9 Nov	1,015	**32**		27	9	5		6	12	2	7	5
Kantar Public	4–9 Nov	975	**30**	1	28	7	4	2	4	9	0	15	2
Social Changes / wPolityce.pl	4–7 Nov	1,074	**35**	2	29	8	4	2	8	10		2	6
United Surveys / WP.pl	4–5 Nov	1,000	**32.4**		26.0	9.6	6.2		4.4	13.1	0.3	8.0	6.4
IBRiS / "Rz"	4–5 Nov	1,100	**33.7**		27.6	10.1	5.7		5.0	10.9		7.0	6.1
Research Partner	28–31 Oct	1,064	**32.6**	0.4	29.0	6.6	5.4	1.2	6.5	10.3		8.0	3.6
Social Changes / wPolityce.pl	28–31 Oct	1,058	**35**	1	28	8	5	2	10	9		2	7
Estymator/ DoRzeczy.pl	27–28 Oct	1,055	**36.4**		28.3	9.8	7.1	1.5	5.2	11.3		0.4	8.1
PGB Opinium	24–26 Oct	1,002	**34.0**		29.6	8.5	4.2	0.9	6.3	12.5	3.0	0.9	4.4
Social Changes / wPolityce.pl	21–24 Oct	1,066	**36**	1	29	8	5	1	8	10		2	7
United Surveys / WP.pl	21–23 Oct	1,000	**32.1**		24.7	7.2	6.7		3.5	14.0	1.1	10.7	7.4
IBRiS / "Rz"	21–22 Oct	1,100	**33.0**		26.7	9.3	6.2		5.2	9.6		10.0	6.3
IBSP	17–20 Oct	800	**34.47**		26.99	7.03	3.71		7.10	18.75	1.95		7.48
Pollster / SE.pl	18–19 Oct	1,000	**35.56**	0.74	30.69	9.01	3.26	0.99	5.95	13.30		0.50	4.87
Social Changes / wPolityce.pl	16–19 Oct	1,082	**36**	1	28	8	5	2	8	10		2	8
Kantar Public	14–19 Oct	1,000	28	<1	**31**	7	4	1	5	10	1	13	3
Research Partner	14–17 Oct	1,081	**30.6**	0.6	26.0	6.5	6.8	1.8	7.5	10.8		9.4	4.6
Estymator / DoRzeczy.pl	13–14 Oct	1,033	**37.1**		27.7	10.7	6.8	1.6	5.7	10.1		0.3	9.4
IBRiS / Onet	11–13 Oct	1,100	**32.7**		27.4	8.4	5.6		5.6	11.3		9.0	5.3
CBOS	3–13 Oct	1,041	**30**		18	6	2	1	5	9		24	12
Social Changes / wPolityce.pl	7–10 Oct	1,077	**36**	1	30	9	3	2	7	10		3	6
United Surveys / WP.pl	7–9 Oct	1,000	**33.8**		26.2	8.8	5.6		5.0	13.6		7.0	7.6
IBRiS / ZET	4–5 Oct	1,100	**33.9**		29.1	8.7	5.9		5.2	10.7		6.5	4.8
Social Changes / wPolityce.pl	30 Sep–3 Oct	1,081	**37**	1	30	7	4	2	8	9		2	7
Social Changes / wPolityce.pl	23–26 Sep	1,088	**36**	1	28	9	4	1	9	11		1	8
United Surveys / WP.pl	23–25 Sep	1,000	**34.1**		26.4	9.2	5.0		6.0	11.9		7.4	7.7
IBRiS / "Rz"	23–24 Sep	1,100	**32.9**		27.1	9.0	6.3		5.6	10.6		8.5	5.8
Estymator / DoRzeczy.pl	22–23 Sep	1,045	**35.9**		26.8	11.0	6.5	1.3	6.1	12.2		0.2	9.1
Pollster / SE.pl	21–22 Sep	1,014	**34.80**	0.35	29.30	9.22	6.05	0.88	6.31	12.63		0.39	5.50
Social Changes / wPolityce.pl	16–19 Sep	1,074	**37**	1	30	6	5	2	8	10		1	7
CBOS	5–15 Sep	1,119	**30**		21	6	2	1	4	10		21	9
IBRiS / Onet	13 Sep	1,100	**31.6**		26.1	9.2	6.2		5.6	13.4		7.9	5.5
Research Partner	9–12 Sep	1,086	**36.7**	0.7	25.6	8.2	3.8	1.6	5.7	7.9		9.9	11.1
Social Changes / wPolityce.pl	9–12 Sep	1,092	**36**	1	26	8	7	2	8	10		2	10
United Surveys / WP.pl	9–11 Sep	1,000	**32.9**		26.2	8.6	5.2		4.2	12.9		10.0	6.7
Estymator / DoRzeczy.pl	8–9 Sep	1,031	**37.0**		26.1	9.9	6.7	1.6	6.7	11.8		0.3	10.9
IPSOS / OKO.press	6–8 Sep	1,009	**33**		26	8	5		7	12	2	6	7
Kantar Public	2–7 Sep	980	**29**	1	27	7	3	3	6	8	1	15	2
Social Changes / wPolityce.pl	2–5 Sep	1,084	**36**	1	29	8	5	1	8	11		1	7
IBRiS / ZET	2–3 Sep	1,100	**33.2**		26.9	7.3	5.4		4.2	14.5		8.5	6.3
United Surveys / DGP, RMF	1 Sep	1,000	**32.0**		25.0	8.1	5.3		5.6	13.3		10.6	7.0
Social Changes / wPolityce.pl	26–29 Aug	1,058	**39**	1	26	8	4	2	8	10		2	13
Research Partner	26–29 Aug	1,086	**35.2**	0.8	25.6	8.0	4.6	1.6	5.3	8.2		10.7	9.6
United Surveys / WP.pl	27–28 Aug	1,000	**31.6**		25.9	9.5	4.8		5.1	14.0		9.1	5.7
IBRiS / "Rz"	26–27 Aug	1,100	**30.9**		25.8	10.1	5.2		3.0	12.1		12.9	5.1
Estymator / DoRzeczy.pl	25–26 Aug	1,022	**36.0**		28.1	10.6	6.9	1.8	6.3	10.1		0.2	7.9
CBOS	14–25 Aug	1,043	**31**	1	21	4	2	1	7	10			10
Pollster / SE.pl	23–24 Aug	1,029	**34.45**	0.78	29.69	9.36	6.20	1.22	5.62	12.25		0.45	4.76
Social Changes / wPolityce.pl	19–22 Aug	1,071	**36**	1	27	9	4	2	9	10		2	9
Kantar / TVN	17–18 Aug	1,003	**29**	0	27	7	2	1	8	13	2	11	2
IBSP	12–17 Aug	1,000	**33.70**		29.09	7.63	3.22		6.06	16.63	3.67		4.61
Social Changes / wPolityce.pl	12–15 Aug	1,068	**39**	0	28	9	4	1	9	8		2	11
Research Partner	12–15 Aug	1,060	**34.7**	0.3	25.8	7.4	4.2	2.0	5.7	8.5		11.4	8.9
Estymator / DoRzeczy.pl	11–12 Aug	1,037	**36.8**		26.8	11.0	7.2	1.7	6.6	9.7		0.2	10.0
Kantar Public	5–10 Aug	927	**30**	1	26	9	4	2	4	9	1	15	4
Social Changes / wPolityce.pl	5–8 Aug	1,066	**37**	1	31	8	5	2	8	7		1	6
Social Changes / wPolityce.pl	29 Jul–1 Aug	1,066	**38**	1	27	8	3	2	9	10		2	11
Research Partner	28 Jul–1 Aug	1,030	**38.2**	0.1	25.8	7.4	5.7	2.0	6.1	7.7		7.1	12.4
United Surveys / WP.pl	29–31 Jul	1,000	**33.2**		27.1	8.5	6.6		4.6	11.4		8.6	6.1
Estymator / DoRzeczy.pl	28–29 Jul	1,022	**36.6**		26.4	11.6	7.1	1.5	6.9	9.5		0.4	10.2
IBRiS / Onet	26 Jul	1,100	**34.9**		26.5	9.5	5.1		5.6	11.6		6.8	8.4
Social Changes / wPolityce.pl	22–25 Jul	1,067	**37**	1	30	7	4	2	8	10		1	7
United Surveys / WP.pl	22–23 Jul	1,000	**34.2**		25.9	9.8	6.3		4.0	9.4		10.4	8.3
Kantar Public	15–20 Jul	981	26	1	**27**	8	5	3	6	8	1	15	1
Pollster / SE.pl	19 Jul	1,070	**33.80**	0.40	27.33	12.69	5.13	0.68	8.66	11.01		0.30	6.47
Social Changes / wPolityce.pl	15–18 Jul	1,082	**39**	0	27	8	3	2	9	10		2	12
Estymator / DoRzeczy.pl	15–16 Jul	1,039	**37.1**		26.6	11.2	6.6	1.6	7.0	9.7		0.2	10.5
Social Changes / wPolityce.pl	8–11 Jul	1,073	**39**	0	26	9	4	1	9	11		1	13
Research Partner	8–11 Jul	1,053	**33.9**	0.6	26.6	8.1	4.8	2.1	4.9	7.7		11.2	7.3
CBOS	27 Jun–7 Jul	1,084	**33**		18	5	3	1	6	8		22	15
ewybory.eu	1 Jun–6 Jul	10,091	**34.17**		28.10	14.78	3.77		7.02	7.41	3.82	0.94 (Note: German Minority – 0.16)	6.07
IBRiS / ZET	5 Jul	1,100	**33.7**		25.2	8.5	5.1		6.0	9.8		11.7	8.5
Social Changes / wPolityce.pl	1–4 Jul	1,070	**37**	1	26	8	5	2	9	10		2	11
United Surveys / WP.pl	1–2 Jul	1,000	**33.1**		24.7	9.4	4.6		6.3	10.7		11.2	8.4
Social Changes / wPolityce.pl	24–27 Jun	1,051	**37**	1	26	9	4	2	9	11		1	11
Research Partner	24–27 Jun	1,051	**34.4**	0.8	24.5	7.8	4.7	1.1	6.2	9.6		10.9	9.9
Estymator / DoRzeczy.pl	23–24 Jun	1,046	**38.0**		26.9	11.8	6.9	1.8	5.9	8.4		0.3	11.1
Kantar / TVN	22–23 Jun	1,003	**31**	0	26	8	2	1	6	10	2	14	5
Pollster / SE.pl	21–22 Jun	1,011	**35.28**	1.03	23.88	10.68	6.63	1.24	5.97	13.68		1.61 (Note: Had Enough 2023 – 1.36)	11.40
Social Changes / wPolityce.pl	17–20 Jun	1,075	**37**	2	27	9	4	2	7	11		1	10
United Surveys / WP.pl	17–19 Jun	1,000	**34.2**		25.5	9.2	5.2		5.3	7.0		13.6	8.7
IBRiS / "Rz"	17–18 Jun	1,000	**34.5**		25.4	8.4	5.5		4.7	9.6		11.9	9.1
Research Partner	10–13 Jun	1,040	**32.8**	0.9	23.0	7.7	4.4	1.4	5.4	10.5		13.8	9.8
Social Changes / wPolityce.pl	10–13 Jun	1,068	**37**	1	25	7	5	2	9	12		2	12
IBSP / Stan Polityki	8–13 Jun	1,000	**37.01**		27.80	7.94	2.65		7.73	15.52	1.08	0.27	9.21
Estymator / DoRzeczy.pl	9–10 Jun	1,059	**38.5**		27.1	11.1	6.3	1.9	5.8	9.0		0.3	11.4
Kantar / "GW"	7–9 Jun	1,000	**32.1**		22.3	8.2	3.6		7.3	9.7		16.8	9.8
CBOS	30 May–9 Jun	1,050	**32**		17	4	3	2	5	12		20	15
Kantar Public	3–8 Jun	981	**29**	1	23	8	4	2	4	10	<1	19	6
United Surveys / DGP, RMF	6–7 Jun	1,000	**37.1**		25.5	8.3	5.0		4.2	10.2		9.7	11.6
Social Changes / wPolityce.pl	3–6 Jun	1,065	**37**	1	27	7	4	1	8	13		2	10
United Surveys / WP.pl	3–4 Jun	1,000	**36.5**		24.9	9.4	5.3		5.6	11.0		7.3	11.6
IBRiS / ZET	30 May–1 Jun	1,100	**35.1**		25.3	8.9	6.3		4.1	8.4		11.9	9.8
Research Partner	27–30 May	1,046	**31.3**	1.0	25.5	7.5	2.6	1.8	7.0	12.1		11.2	5.8
Social Changes / wPolityce.pl	23–30 May	1,055	**37**	1	27	8	3	2	8	13		1	10
Estymator / DoRzeczy.pl	26–27 May	1,041	**39.5**		28.4	10.5	6.2	1.6	5.1	8.2		0.5	11.1
Pollster / SE.pl	24–25 May	1,062	**35.28**	0.82	25.09	10.91	4.72	2.20	6.30	12.35		2.33 (Note: Had Enough 2023 – 2.07)	10.19
Social Changes / wPolityce.pl	20–23 May	1,074	**38**	1	25	8	3	2	10	12		1	13
IBRiS / "Rz"	20–21 May	1,000	**36.9**		26.8	8.4	5.7		5.1	9.4		7.7	10.1
United Surveys / WP.pl	20–21 May	1,000	**36.2**		25.2	9.2	5.7		5.2	8.4		10.1	11.0
Kantar Public	13–18 May	990	**29**	2	24	8	3	3	4	9	1	17	5
Social Changes / wPolityce.pl	13–16 May	1,053	**38**	0	28	7	3	2	9	11		2	10
Estymator / DoRzeczy.pl	12–13 May	1,029	**39.2**		27.1	11.2	6.4	2.0	5.9	7.9		0.3	12.1
IPSOS / OKO.press	10–12 May	1,014	**35**	0	26	9	4		7	13		6	9
CBOS	2–12 May	1,087	**36**		19	4	2		3	9		19	17
Social Changes / wPolityce.pl	6–9 May	1,067	**36**		27	9	4	2	8	12		2	9
Research Partner	5–9 May	1,038	**30.8**	0.4	26.3	6.0	4.0	1.6	6.8	11.6		12.5	4.5
United Surveys / WP.pl	6–7 May	1,000	**34.7**		27.0	9.0	5.0		5.4	9.3		9.6	7.7
IBRiS / ZET	4 May	1,100	**35.9**		26.3	9.0	5.1		5.0	8.6		10.1	9.6
United Surveys / DGP, RMF	2–4 May	1,000	**37.8**		24.9	10.2	5.4		4.7	9.0		6.7	12.9
Social Changes / wPolityce.pl	29 Apr–3 May	1,074	**37**	1	27	8	3	2	8	12		2	10
Estymator / DoRzeczy.pl	28–29 Apr	1,042	**38.4**		27.0	10.5	6.7	1.8	7.3	8.0		0.3	11.4
Pollster / SE.pl	27–28 Apr	1,046	**35.41**	0.30	26.48	10.12	5.70	2.14	5.45	14.14		0.26	8.93
IBRiS / Onet	26 Apr	1,100	**34.7**		27.0	8.6	5.0		4.5	9.1		11.1	7.7
Social Changes / wPolityce.pl	22–25 Apr	1,090	**40**	1	25	8	3	2	8	12		2	15
Research Partner	22–25 Apr	1,093	**32.5**	0.2	25.5	6.1	3.7	1.9	7.9	10.7		11.5	7.0
United Surveys / WP.pl	22–23 Apr	1,000	**36.0**		26.6	9.3	5.8		3.3	10.7		8.3	9.4
Social Changes / wPolityce.pl	15–18 Apr	1,057	**36**	1	26	10	2	1	11	11		2	10
Estymator / DoRzeczy.pl	12–14 Apr	1,053	**39.0**		26.4	8.5	6.6	1.6	8.3	9.1		0.5	12.6
Kantar Public	8–13 Apr	979	**30**	1	26	8	4	2	6	9	<1	14	4
Social Changes / wPolityce.pl	8–11 Apr	1,079	**39**	0	26	7	3	2	9	13		1	13
Research Partner	8–11 Apr	1,055	**32.7**	0.9	23.3	6.1	3.8	2.3	6.3	11.6		12.9	9.4
IBSP / Stan Polityki	7–11 Apr	1,000	**40.68**		22.61	5.53	2.82		6.94	16.95	4.17	0.30	18.07
CBOS	28 Mar–7 Apr	1,030	**32**	0	17	4	2	0	4	11		24 (Note: PPS – 0)	15
Social Changes / wPolityce.pl	1–4 Apr	1,067	**38**	1	25	9	5	2	8	11		1	13
IBRiS / "Rz"	1–2 Apr	1,100	**32.9**		25.1	7.1	5.0		6.3	9.0		14.6	7.8
United Surveys / WP.pl	1–2 Apr	1,000	**33.7**		23.7	6.2	5.4		5.1	9.7		16.2	10.0
Estymator / DoRzeczy.pl	30–31 Mar	1,031	**39.2**		25.4	8.3	6.1	1.8	7.4	10.9		0.9	13.8
IBRiS / ZET	30–31 Mar	1,100	**34.2**		26.2	6.3	5.3		7.8	8.3		11.9	8.0
Social Changes / wPolityce.pl	25–28 Mar	1,063	**37**	1	29	7	3	2	9	11		1	8
Social Changes / wPolityce.pl	25–28 Mar	1,063	**36**	1	28	7	3	2	8	10	4	1	8
Research Partner	25–28 Mar	1,056	**33.6**	0.5	24.2	6.4	3.1	1.9	8.0	11.8		10.7	9.4
Kantar Public / Polityka	18–21 Mar	1,000	**31**	1	22	5	2	1	6	14		19	9
Social Changes / wPolityce.pl	18–21 Mar	1,074	**37**	1	25	8	5	2	10	11		1	12
United Surveys / DGP, RMF	18–19 Mar	1,000	**34.6**		23.2	6.9	4.8		6.7	11.1		12.7	11.4
United Surveys / WP.pl	18 Mar	1,000	**33.4**		23.1	8.1	5.2		4.1	9.1		17.0	10.3
Kantar Public	11–16 Mar	974	**30**	1	27	7	3	2	5	9	0.9	16	3
Research Partner	11–14 Mar		**31.4**	1.0	25.8	8.2	4.3	1.5	7.6	10.4		9.8	5.6
Estymator / DoRzeczy.pl	10–11 Mar	1,022	**39.6**		25.1	7.5	6.3	1.5	7.0	12.2		0.8	14.5
IPSOS / OKO.press	8–10 Mar	1,000	**34**	0	24	5	4		11	12		10	10
CBOS	28 Feb–10 Mar	1,078	**30**		20	4	2		6	11		25	10
Kantar / KO	4 Mar	1,000	**30**	0	25	4	5	1	10	14		10	5
United Surveys / WP.pl	4 Mar	1,000	**33.6**		21.2	6.9	4.6		4.4	9.7		19.6	12.4
Pollster / SE.pl	2–3 Mar	1,041	**37.99**	0.82	25.89	6.59	5.97	1.57	7.66	13.08		0.43	12.10
IBRiS / ZET	1 Mar	1,100	**37.4**		22.8	7.2	4.9		4.1	10.9		12.7	14.6
Social Changes / wPolityce.pl	28 Feb–1 Mar	1,006	**38**	1	27	7	4	2	8	11		2	11
Research Partner	25–28 Feb	1,074	**32.6**	0.8	25.7	7.0	3.4	1.5	7.3	11.0		10.7	6.9
	24 February	**Beginning of the Russian invasion of Ukraine**											
Social Changes / wPolityce.pl	18–21 Feb		**33**	1	28	8	4	2	10	12		2	5
United Surveys / WP.pl	18 Feb	1,000	**32.2**		26.9	7.1	5.2		9.0	9.4		10.2	5.3
Estymator / DoRzeczy.pl	16–17 Feb	1,047	**36.4**		27.5	7.8	6.6		9.4	9.5		2.8	8.9
Pollster / SE.pl	16–17 Feb	1,059	**36.05**	0.55	24.46	8.27	5.83	1.24	9.14	14.25		0.21	11.59
Kantar Public	11–16 Feb	990	**30**	1	25	5	4	2	8	9	1	15	5
Social Changes / wPolityce.pl	11–14 Feb	1,080	**38**	1	26	8	2	2	10	12		1	12
Research Partner	11–14 Feb	1,075	**31.1**	0.5	23.7	8.8	5.8	1.9	8.3	9.9		10.0	7.4
IBRiS / Onet	11–12 Feb	1,100	**32.5**		29.3	5.6	4.3		8.4	8.6		11.3	3.2
IBRiS / Onet	11–12 Feb	1,100	**32.7**		28.0	6.3	4.1		7.7	8.1	2.7	10.4	4.7
CBOS	31 Jan–10 Feb	1,065	**30**		17	3	2	1	7	11		28	13
Social Changes / wPolityce.pl	4–7 Feb	1,078	**31**	1	26	10	4	2	12	12		2	5
IBSP / Stan Polityki	3–7 Feb	1,000	**34.63**		26.34	7.54	3.47		8.96	14.88	3.66	0.52	8.29
United Surveys / WP.pl	6 Feb	1,000	**33.1**	0.0	25.1	5.8	5.2		8.5	11.7	0.6	10.0	8.0
IBRiS / "Rz"	4–6 Feb	1,100	**31.1**		26.7	6.6	5.2		6.9	11.1		12.4	4.4
Research Partner	28 Jan–1 Feb	1,090	**31.3**	0.4	27.3	6.7	3.9	1.0	7.9	11.6		9.9	4.0
Social Changes / wPolityce.pl	28–31 Jan	1,066	**33**	1	28	8	5	2	11	11		1	5
Social Changes / wPolityce.pl	28–31 Jan	1,066	**32**	1	27	8	5	2	10	12		3 (Note: Federation for the Republic of Poland – 2)	5
United Surveys / DGP, RMF	27 Jan	1,000	**33.2**		26.1	6.2	6.0		5.8	10.6		12.1	7.1
Kantar Public	21–26 Jan	986	**27**	1	26	7	3	3	9	9		15	1
Social Changes / wPolityce.pl	21–24 Jan	1,075	**35**	1	28	8	3	2	10	11		2	7
United Surveys / WP.pl	21 Jan	1,000	**32.3**		27.2	7.0	6.5		6.8	11.2		9.0	5.1
Kantar / KO	17–18 Jan	1,000	**29**	1	26	5	4	1	9	15		9	3
Research Partner	14–17 Jan	1,053	**31.7**	0.3	23.9	8.0	2.0	0.9	9.0	11.1		13.1	7.8
Social Changes / wPolityce.pl	14–17 Jan	1,063	**34**	0	27	10	3	2	11	12		1	7
IBRiS / Onet	13 Jan	1,100	**30.1**		20.2	7.3	6.0		8.6	12.1		15.7	9.9
Pollster / SE.pl	12–13 Jan	1,044	**32.81**	0.30	24.50	7.06	6.44	1.25	10.11	17.08		0.45	8.31
CBOS	3–13 Jan	1,135	**29.4**	1	17.8	3	3	1	5.2	11.8		27	11.6
Social Changes / wPolityce.pl	7–10 Jan	1,071	**36**	1	24	9	2	2	10	14		2	12
United Surveys / WP.pl	6–7 Jan	1,000	**33.0**		25.1	8.2	7.6		8.0	11.0		7.2	7.9
Social Changes / wPolityce.pl	31 Dec–2 Jan	1,069	**38**	1	24	7	2	2	12	13		1	14

=== 2021 ===
Polling firm/Link	Fieldwork date	Sample size	United Right	Agreement	Civic Coalition	The Left	Polish Coalition	Kukiz'15	Confederation	Poland 2050	Others / Don't know	Lead
Estymator / DoRzeczy.pl	29–30 Dec	1,029	**35.9**		24.2	8.4	6.8		9.0	13.5	2.2	11.7
IPSOS / OKO.press	28–30 Dec	1,018	**33**	1	26	6	5		10	13	7	7
Social Changes / wPolityce.pl	17–20 Dec	1,052	**36**	2	25	8	3	2	11	13	0	11
IBRiS / "Rz"	17–18 Dec	1,100	**30.8**		24.1	7.8	5.9		6.3	10.1	15.0	6.7
United Surveys / WP.pl	17 Dec	1,000	**32.1**		24.9	8.1	6.5		5.1	9.2	14.0 (Note: AGROunia 0.7)	7.2
Research Partner	10–13 Dec	1,033	**35.3**	0.2	22.4	7.6	1.4	1.8	8.2	11.8	11.3	12.9
Social Changes / wPolityce.pl	10–13 Dec	1,076	**38**	1	24	7	2	1	11	14	2	14
Pollster / SE.pl	11–12 Dec	1,046	**36.38**	0.19	25.81	6.18	4.38	1.35	10.70	14.55	0.46	10.57
Kantar / TVN	10–12 Dec	1,000	**31**	1	24	6	6	2	7	14	8	7
Kantar / Polityka	8–12 Dec		**27**	1	21	10	5	2	7	17	9	6
CBOS	29 Nov–12 Dec	1,063	**31.2**		14.5	5.1	3	1	7.0	14.0	25	16.7
Kantar Public	3–8 Dec	975	**28**	1	26	7	3	1	8	11	15	2
Social Changes / wPolityce.pl	3–6 Dec	1,073	**38**	2	24	9	2	2	9	13	1	14
United Surveys / WP.pl	3 Dec	1,000	**32.1**		23.7	7.8	5.7		6.7	10.6	13.4	8.4
Social Changes / wPolityce.pl	26–29 Nov	1,054	**38**	1	25	9	2	1	10	12	2	13
Research Partner	26–29 Nov	1,030	**37.1**	0.6	20.6	6.9	3.2	1.1	8.4	10.6	11.5	16.5
IBRiS / Onet	26–27 Nov	1,100	**32.0**		22.1	7.0	6.4		7.1	11.8	13.7	9.9
Estymator / DoRzeczy.pl	25–26 Nov	1,021	**35.3**		23.8	7.7	7.1		8.6	15.8	1.7	11.5
IBRiS / "Wydarzenia" Polsat	23 Nov	1,100	**30.2**		21.8	7.6	5.1		9.3	13.0	13.0	8.4
Pollster / SE.pl	22–23 Nov	1,016	**37.53**	0.68	24.30	8.04	4.46	0.97	8.00	15.74	0.28	13.23
Social Changes / wPolityce.pl	19–22 Nov	1,079	**39**	1	25	8	1	1	10	13	2	14
IBRiS / "Rz"	19–20 Nov	1,100	**30.2**		21.2	8.4	4.6		6.1	13.2	16.3	9.0
United Surveys / DGP, RMF	18–19 Nov	1,000	**31.0**		22.1	7.0	5.8		6.5	12.3	15.2	8.9
United Surveys / WP.pl	18–19 Nov	1,000	**30.6**		21.7	7.7	5.1		5.8	13.3	15.8	8.9
Kantar Public / "GW"	16–18 Nov	1,002	**30**	0	24	8	4	2	9	14	10	6
Kantar Public	12–17 Nov	968	**29**	1	24	7	4	2	5	10	11	5
Social Changes / wPolityce.pl	12–15 Nov	1,069	**41**	1	23	7	1	2	11	13	1	18
CBOS	4–14 Nov	1,100	**29.3**		17.9	4.9	2	1	5.5	12.0	27	11.4
Research Partner	5–9 Nov	1,038	**33.8**	0.6	23.8	7.6	2.2	1.1	9.4	10.8	10.7	10.0
Social Changes / wPolityce.pl	5–8 Nov	1,082	**37**	1	24	9	1	2	10	14	2	13
Estymator / DoRzeczy.pl	5–6 Nov	1,016	**37.6**		24.6	9.1	5.7		8.2	12.8	2.0	13.0
United Surveys / WP.pl	5 Nov	1,000	**32.6**		21.6	7.2	4.6		5.9	16.5	11.7	11.0
Social Changes / wPolityce.pl	29 Oct–2 Nov	1,059	**39**	1	25	8	2	2	9	12	2	14
CBOS	18–28 Oct	1,157	**28.4**		17.2	4.7	3		7.6	12.2	26	11.2
Pollster / SE.pl	27–28 Oct	1,078	**36.58**	0.60	25.80	8.56	4.41	1.29	8.77	13.80	0.19	10.78
Social Changes / wPolityce.pl	22–25 Oct	1,067	**39**	0	26	8	2	2	10	12	1	13
Research Partner	22–25 Oct	1,223	**35.0**	0.7	23.3	7.0	3.0	1.5	7.7	11.3	10.3	11.7
IBRiS / "Rz.pl"	22–23 Oct	1,100	**35.8**		24.5	9.4	4.6		5.1	13.5	7.1	11.3
United Surveys / WP.pl	22 Oct	1,000	**37.1**		23.3	8.0	6.2		6.1	12.0	7.3	13.8
Social Changes / wPolityce.pl	15–18 Oct	1,096	**39**	2	26	7	2	2	8	13	1	13
CBOS	4–14 Oct	1,161	**34.6**	1	15.3	4.1	2	0	5.7	11.5	26	19.3
Kantar / TVN	12–13 Oct	1,000	**32**	1	26	6	4	0	9	15	7	6
Kantar Public	8–13 Oct	968	**32**	1	25	7	3	2	6	10	14	7
United Surveys / DGP, RMF	11 Oct	1,000	**35.4**		27.1	6.7	4.6		6.8	9.5	9.9	8.3
Research Partner	8–11 Oct	1,031	**36.2**	1.0	21.0	6.7	1.6	0.7	9.4	11.5	11.8	15.2
Social Changes / wPolityce.pl	8–11 Oct	1,068	**40**	2	26	7	2	2	7	12	2	14
United Surveys / WP.pl	8 Oct	1,000	**35.4**		25.9	7.9	5.8		6.7	9.8	8.5	9.5
	7 Oct	**Constitutional Tribunal's landmark decision on the primacy of European Union law, sparking protests**										
IBRiS / "Wydarzenia" Polsat	6 Oct	1,100	**34.3**	0.0	21.6	8.0	5.4		8.4	10.5	11.7	12.7
Social Changes / wPolityce.pl	1–4 Oct	1,090	**37**	1	25	7	1	2	11	14	2	12
	30 Sep	**State of emergency extended for another 60 days**										
Social Changes / wPolityce.pl	24–27 Sep	1,059	**38**	1	26	8	2	1	9	14	1	12
Research Partner	24–27 Sep	1,036	**35.2**	0.7	22.4	7.4	2.0	1.1	8.6	11.1	11.4	12.8
IBRiS / "Rz.pl"	24–25 Sep	1,100	**34.1**	0.0	23.4	7.1	5.0		5.9	12.0	12.5	10.7
United Surveys / WP.pl	24 Sep	1,000	**35.6**		23.0	6.4	5.3		7.1	11.6	11.0	12.6
IPSOS / "GW", OKO.press	20–23 Sep	1,000	**35**	0	24	7	4		9	15	7	11
Social Changes / wPolityce.pl	17–20 Sep	1,050	**37**	2	24	7	2	2	12	13	1	13
CBOS	6–16 Sep	1,218	**33.5**	1	16.0	4.4	1	1	5.3	11.8	26	17.5
Pollster / SE.pl	13–14 Sep	1,048	**39.5**	0.71	24.54	7.56	4.66	1.08	7.35	14.32	0.28	14.96
Social Changes / wPolityce.pl	10–13 Sep	1,063	**37**	2	27	7	2	2	9	12	2	10
Social Changes / wPolityce.pl	10–13 Sep	1,063	**36**	2	29 (Note: Rafał Trzaskowski as party leader)	6	2	2	10	12	1	8
Pollster / Salon24.pl	11–12 Sep	1,027	**38.87**	0.64	25.68	7.84	3.85	0.71	8.21	13.86	0.34	13.19
Estymator / DoRzeczy.pl	10–11 Sep	1,016	**40.2**	1.1	24.1	9.0	3.9	1.5	8.8	10.9	0.5 (Note: AGROunia – 0.4)	16.1
Kantar / TVN	9–11 Sep	1,002	**30**	0	24	5	3	1	8	14	15	6
United Surveys / WP.pl	10 Sep	1,000	**36.4**		22.3	6.8	5.2		8.8	9.2	11.3	14.1
Kantar Public	3–8 Sep	979	**32**	1	25	6	3	1	4	12	16	7
IBRiS / "Wydarzenia" Polsat	7 Sep	1,100	**36.5**	0.3	23.0	8.5	2.9		7.6	11.3	9.9	13.5
Social Changes / wPolityce.pl	3–6 Sep	1,051	**37**	1	26	8	3	1	7	16	1	11
Research Partner	3–6 Sep	1,077	**30.5**	0.4	22.0	7.2	0.8	1.6	8.5	17.9	11.2	8.5
IBRiS / Onet	3–4 Sep	1,100	**36.6**		23.1	8.0	4.4		8.0	11.5	8.4	13.5
Pollster / Wiadomości TVP	2–3 Sep	1,047	**36.72**		25.98	7.53			8.77	14.78	6.22	10.74
IBSP / Stan Polityki	1–3 Sep	1,000	**34.61**		24.09	7.73	2.65		9.69	15.82	5.41 (Note: AGROunia – 5.07)	10.52
	2 Sep	**State of emergency declared in Poland; covering 183 localities in Podlaskie and Lublin voivodeships**										
Social Changes / wPolityce.pl	27–30 Aug	1,065	**35**	1	25	9	3	2	8	17	0	10
IBRiS / "Rz"	27–28 Aug	1,100	**35.3**		25.7	9.3	4.0		6.4	10.1	9.2	9.6
United Surveys / DGP, RMF	27 Aug	1,000	**37.1**		25.0	9.0	4.5		8.1	8.4	7.9	12.2
United Surveys / WP.pl	27 Aug	1,000	**36.3**		25.5	8	4.4		8	10.6	6.4	10.8
Pollster / Wiadomości TVP	26–27 Aug	1,036	**37**		24	7			10	16	6	13
CBOS	16–26 Aug	1,167	**34**	<0.5	18	5	3	1	5	11	23	16
IBRiS / "Wydarzenia" Polsat	24 Aug	1,100	**35.5**	0.0	24.3	7.8	4.2		7.4	11.7	9.1	11.2
Social Changes / wPolityce.pl	20–23 Aug	1,057	**33**	1	26	8	2	2	9	17	2	7
Pollster / TVP Info	15–16 Aug	1,044	**34**	0.8	26	8	4	1	8	18	0.2	8
Research Partner	13–16 Aug	1,039	**30.6**		22.2	6.9	2.0	1.3	7.2	17.0	12.8	8.4
Research Partner	13–16 Aug	1,039	**27.4**	0.6	22.7	5.8	1.8	0.4	5.9	14.5	21.0 (Note: AGROunia – 4.9)	4.7
Social Changes / wPolityce.pl	13–16 Aug	1,052	**33**	2	26	7	2	2	9	18	1	7
Kantar	13 Aug	800	**26**		**26**	10	3	0	7	17	7	Tie
	Early August	**Beginning of the Belarus-Poland border crisis**										
	11 August	**Agreement leaves United Right. The ruling coalition loses majority in Sejm**										
Kantar	6–11 Aug	981	**35**		22	7	4	2	6	9	15	13
	10 August	**Dismissal of Deputy Prime Minister Jarosław Gowin and several deputy ministers**										
	10 August	**Nationwide protests against Lex TVN, a controversial media law reform**										
ewybory.eu	1 Jul–10 Aug	10,088	**31.38**		29.72	14.10	5.29		10.65	7.83	1.03	1.66
Social Changes / wPolityce.pl	6–9 Aug	1,083	**34**		26	8	2	4	8	17	1	8
Social Changes / wPolityce.pl	30 Jul–2 Aug	1,064	**34**		23	7	3	3	8	21	1	11
Research Partner	30 Jul–2 Aug	1,040	**30.8**		22.0	6.8	1.7	2.7	6.9	15.4	13.6	8.8
Pollster / SE.pl	30 Jul–2 Aug	1,049	**34.48**		25.78	8.27	3.07	2.15	9.68	16.29	0.28	8.70
IBRiS / "Rz"	31 Jul–1 Aug	1,094	**33.6**		27.3	9.1	5.0		5.0	11.1	9.0	6.3
United Surveys / WP.pl	30 Jul	1,000	**34.2**		27.6	6.9	5.0		5.9	10.0	10.4	6.6
Social Changes / wPolityce.pl	23–26 Jul	1,063	**36**		24	7	2	2	9	19	1	12
Social Changes / wPolityce.pl	23–26 Jul	1,063	**35**		27 (Note: Rafał Trzaskowski as party leader)	7	2	3	6	19	1	8
IBRiS / Onet	24–25 Jul	1,100	**33.6**		26.2	7.1	5.0		5.4	10.9	11.8	7.4
IBSP	21–23 Jul	1,001	**34.85**		26.24	6.38	2.32		7.37	19.76	3.08 (Note: AGROunia – 2.50)	8.61
Research Partner	16–19 Jul	1,051	**30.2**		24.1	7.5	1.8	1.7	5.9	17.4	11.4	6.1
Social Changes / wPolityce.pl	16–19 Jul	1,049	**34**		25	8	2	2	9	19	1	9
Kantar	9–14 Jul	969	**30**		23	5	4	2	5	15	16	7
Social Changes / wPolityce.pl	9–12 Jul	1,062	**34**		24	9	4	1	7	20	1	10
Kantar / TVN	9–11 Jul	1,000	**29**		24	7	3	1	7	15	14 (Note: others – 1, don't know – 13)	5
CBOS	1–11 Jul	1,166	**36**		16	5	3	1	5	13	21	20
Pollster / SE.pl	6–7 Jul	1,049	**35.25**		24.30	6.45	4.30	2.60	7.67	18.75	0.68	10.95
United Surveys / WP.pl	5–7 Jul	1,000	**35.2**		21.3	7.8	5.1		5.6	16.5	8.5	13.9
IBRiS / "Wydarzenia" Polsat	6 Jul	1,100	**34.0**		20.0	8.2	5.3		7.0	15.5	10.0	14.0
Research Partner	2–5 Jul	1,041	**30.6**		18.6	6.4	1.9	3	8.2	19.1	12.1 (Note: others – 0.5, don't know – 11.6)	11.5
United Surveys / DGP, RMF	5 Jul	1,000	**33.0**		18.6	7.8	6.0		7.0	16.6	11.0	14.4
Social Changes / wPolityce.pl	2–5 Jul	1,057	**33**		21	9	2	2	8	24	1	9
Opinia24 / RMF FM	2–5 Jul	1,000	**29**		23	8	4	1	10	17	8	6
	3 Jul	**Borys Budka resignation as PO leader; Donald Tusk acting leader**										
IBRiS / "Wydarzenia" Polsat	30 Jun	1,100	**33.5**		16.9	9.5	6.6		8.4	17.1	8.2	16.4
Social Changes / wPolityce.pl	25–28 Jun	1,082	**34**		17	10	3	2	10	23	1	11
Pollster / SE.pl	26–27 Jun	1,088	**35.79**		20.96	6.32	4.84		7.99	23.04	1.06	12.75
IBRiS / Onet	25–26 Jun	1,100	**33.5**		16.1	8.3	5.4		9.3	17.9	9.5	15.6
Kantar / TVN	24–25 Jun	1,001	**30**		19	6	4	1	8	21	11	9
Research Partner	18–21 Jun	1,048	**31.2**		17.4	7.0	3.1	2.0	6.1	22.5	10.8 (Note: others – 0.9, don't know – 9.9)	8.7
Social Changes / wPolityce.pl	18–21 Jun	1,060	**33**		19	9	4	2	7	25	1	8
Social Changes / wPolityce.pl	18–21 Jun	1,060	**32**		25 (Note: Donald Tusk as party leader)	8	3	3	6	22	1	7
	20 Jun	**The Republicans party is officially founded and joins United Right**										
IBRiS / "Rz"	19–20 Jun	1,100	**34.7**		13.0	9.1	5.1		10.3	20.2	7.7	14.5
United Surveys / WP.pl	19 Jun	1,000	**34.2**		14.7	10.4	5.3		7.1	19.0	9.3	15.2
CBOS	7–17 Jun	1,218	**35.6**		11.3	5.3	2	2	5.5	16.1	22	19.5
Kantar	11–16 Jun	986	**30**		20	7	4	2	6	14	17	10
	14 Jun	**Kukiz signs a confidence-and-supply agreement with PiS' Kaczynski**										
Social Changes / wPolityce.pl	11–14 Jun	1,068	**35**		17	10	3	2	7	25	1	10
	11 Jun	**Wiosna's general assembly votes to dissolve itself and merge with SLD into New Left**										
IBRiS / ZET	11 Jun	1,000	**32.4**		13.0	7.6	4.7		8.1	19.8	14.4	12.6
Research Partner	4–7 Jun	1,106	**31.1**		16.0	6.8	2.7	2.3	6.1	24.8	9.9	6.3
Pollster / SE.pl	5–6 Jun	1,047	**36.18**		18.44	7.01	4.92		9.70	23.02	0.73	13.16
Social Changes / wPolityce.pl	4–6 Jun	1,067	**34**		16	8	3	3	9	26	1	8
United Surveys / WP.pl	4 Jun	1,000	**34.4**		14.0	8.1	4.7		7.6	23.0	8.2	11.4
IBRiS / Onet	31 May	1,100	**34.9**		14.1	8.4	5.0		4.4	20.2	12.9	14.7
Social Changes / wPolityce.pl	28–31 May	1,057	**35**		15	9	3	3	7	27	1	8
IBRiS / Interia	28 May	1,100	**40.3**		15.9	9.4	4.4		7.3	22.9	(Note: Without undecided voters)	17.4
United Surveys / DGP, RMF	25 May	1,000	**33.7**		13.0	8.0	4.3		8.2	22.7	9.9	11.0
Social Changes / wPolityce.pl	21–24 May	1,088	**34**		17	9	2	3	10	24	1	10
IBRiS / "Rz"	21–22 May	1,100	**33.6**		14.6	10.4	4.9		6.9	18.6	11.0	15.0
United Surveys / WP.pl	21 May	1,000	**34.8**		13.2	9.1	5.3		5.7	22.1	9.8	12.7
Estymator / DoRzeczy.pl	20–21 May	1,022	**38.4**		14.6	10.8	4.7	1.9	7.1	22.2	0.3	16.2
Pollster / SE.pl	19–20 May	1,013	**38.10**		19.20	7.26	4.95		8.72	20.90	0.87	17.20
PGB Opinium	18–20 May	1,011	**31.7**		14.7	8.1	3.5	0.7	8.7	23.4	9.2	8.3
IBRiS / "Wydarzenia" Polsat	19 May	1,100	**34.4**		14.2	9.5	5.2		6.9	20.4	9.4	14.0
Social Changes / wPolityce.pl	14–17 May	1,064	**33**		16	9	3	3	12	23	1	10
Research Partner	14–17 May	1,098	**30.9**		16.6	6.4	1.7	2.0	7.7	20.5	14.2	10.4
UCE RESEARCH / WP	15–16 May	1,122	**35.66**		17.34	5.60	3	6.43	9.74	20.53	1.7	15.13
CBOS	6–16 May	1,163	**32.8**		11.0	5.5	2	1	6.1	17.1	19	15.7
IBSP	13–14 May	1,001	**30.80**		15.05	9.98	2.40		11.54	27.68	2.61 (Note: AGROunia – 2.40)	3.12
Kantar	7–12 May	984	**33**		21	6	3	2	5	17	13	12
Kantar	11 May	1,100	**32**		19	10	4	4	11	21	0	11
United Surveys / DGP, RMF	11 May	1,000	**33.5** (Note: PiS party only, excludes other United Right coalition members.)		12.1	9.6	4.3		8.6	21.9	9.9	11.6
United Surveys / DGP, RMF	11 May	1,000	**34.0**		15.7 (Note: Borys Budka and Rafał Trzaskowski as party leaders)	9.1	6.4 (Note: Władysław Kosiniak-Kamysz and Bronisław Komorowski as party leaders)		6.9	19.6	8.4	14.4
Social Changes / wPolityce.pl	7–10 May	1,073	**34**		18	7	2	2	10	25	2	9
IBRiS / Onet	8–9 May	1,100	**35.1**		14.7	9.1	5.6		5.8	19.9	9.8	15.2
IBRiS / "Wydarzenia" Polsat	5 May	1,100	**33.9**		15.3	10.7	4.5		9.0	18.9	7.7	15.0
United Surveys / WP.pl	4 May	1,000	**35.4**		15.1	10.4	5.1		5.7	20.4	7.9	15.0
Social Changes / wPolityce.pl	30 Apr–4 May	1,070	**34**		16	10	2	3	10	23	2	11
Research Partner	30 Apr–3 May	1,127	**27.9**		17.2	7.2	1.5	1.6	7.7	23.6	13	4.3
Kantar / TVN	27–28 Apr	1,001	**30**		21	9	3	2	7	20	8	9
IPSOS / OKO.press	26–28 Apr	1,000	**33**		18	9	2		11	22	5	11
Social Changes / wPolityce.pl	23–26 Apr	1,067	**32**		20	10	2	3	8	24	1	8
IBRiS / Onet	24–25 Apr	1,100	**33.1**		16.1	10.0	4.4		7.7	17.1	11.6	16.0
Pollster / SE.pl	20 Apr	1,066	**35.77**		17.34	10.08	5.14		8.64	21.91	1.12	13.86
IBRiS / "Wydarzenia" Polsat	20 Apr	1,100	**32.6**		16.4	11.5	4.9		8.2	15.7	10.7	16.2
Social Changes / wPolityce.pl	16–19 Apr	1,072	**34**		16	10	2	3	8	26	1	8
Research Partner	16–19 Apr	1,115	**29.4**		17.0	9.2	2.4	2.3	8.4	21.1	10.3	8.3
CBOS	8–18 Apr	1,131	**32.0**		14.2	5.1	1.3	1.2	4.9	15.6	20.9	16.4
United Surveys / WP.pl	16 Apr	1,000	**32.2**		17.0	7.7	4.9		7.0	17.3	14.0	14.9
Estymator / DoRzeczy.pl	15–16 Apr	1,029	**35.9**		18.1	10.7	5.2	2.1	6.8	20.9	0.3	15.0
Kantar	9–14 Apr	980	**31**		22	9	3	2	6	16	11	9
Social Changes / wPolityce.pl	9–12 Apr	1,069	**33**		18	10	2	3	9	24	1	9
IBRiS / "Rz"	9–10 Apr	1,100	**31.0**		15.2	8.1	5.1		7.2	19.1	14.3	11.9
United Surveys / DGP, RMF	9 Apr	1,000	**33.3**		17.9	8.9	4.9		4.8	19.0	11.2	14.3
IBSP	7–9 Apr	1,000	**30.36**		20.32	10.81	2.00		8.77	25.05	2.69 (Note: AGROunia – 2.08)	5.31
Research Partner	2–6 Apr	1,129	**27.1**		17.5	7.3	2.3	2.8	7.6	23.8	11.6	3.3
Social Changes / wPolityce.pl	2–5 Apr	1,074	**34**		24	14	3	3	8		14	10
Social Changes / wPolityce.pl	2–5 Apr	1,074	**30**		20	13	2	3	8	22	2	8
Social Changes / wPolityce.pl	26–29 Mar	1,094	**32**		22	13	3	4	11		15	10
Social Changes / wPolityce.pl	26–29 Mar	1,094	**28**		17	12	5	4	10	22	2	6
IBRiS / Onet	27–28 Mar	1,100	**31.0**		17.3	9.1	5.0		7.3	17.2	13.1	13.7
Social Changes / wPolityce.pl	19–22 Mar	1,085	**32**		23	12	4	4	10		15	9
Social Changes / wPolityce.pl	19–22 Mar	1,085	**29**		18	10	3	4	10	24	2	5
Research Partner	19–22 Mar	1,128	**29.8**		15.7	8.7	2.3	1.8	8.7	22.1	10.9	7.7
United Surveys / WP.pl	19 Mar	1,000	**33.2**		18.5	9.3	6.3		6.5	13.2	12.9	14.7
Kantar / Polityka	19 Mar	1,000	**28**		17	10	2		8	25	10 (Note: Don't know – 8, others – 2)	3
Kantar / "GW", OKO.press	17–18 Mar	1,000	**26**		16	8	3		9	23	16	3
Social Changes / wPolityce.pl	12–15 Mar	1,078	**33**		24	13	3	3	10		14	9
Social Changes / wPolityce.pl	12–15 Mar	1,078	**31**		18	10	2	3	9	25	2	6
Estymator / DoRzeczy.pl	11–12 Mar	1,025	**37.7**		17.1	11.6	5.9	2.4	6.8	18.3	0.2	19.4
PGB Opinium	11–12 Mar	1,098	**30.0**		18.8	8.6	4.1	1.1	8.3	21.6	7.48	8.4
CBOS	1–11 Mar	1,154	**33.3**		11.3	6.0	2.4	0.8	6.7	17.2	22.3	16.1
Kantar	5–10 Mar	985	**30**		24	8	3	2	5	14	14	6
Research Partner	5–8 Mar	1,145	**26.9**		17.9	10.0	1.1	2.5	8.0	22.1	11.4	4.8
Social Changes / wPolityce.pl	5–8 Mar	1,054	**32**		24	13	4	4	10		13	8
Social Changes / wPolityce.pl	5–8 Mar	1,054	**31**		20	12	3	3	9	20	2	11
Opinia24 / RMF	1–7 Mar	3,007	**29**		20	9	2	2	8	24	7	5
IBRiS / "Rz"	5–6 Mar	1,100	**32.3**		18.1	7.4	6.0		6.2	17.9	12.1	14.2
United Surveys / WP.pl	5 Mar	1,000	**33.0**		17.5	9.6	5.3		5.3	17.7	11.6	15.3
Pollster / SE.pl	3–4 Mar	1,033	**39.86**		20.32	9.79	4.8		6.95	17.32	0.96	19.54
Social Changes / wPolityce.pl	26 Feb–1 Mar	1,071	**30**		28	12	3	4	10		13	2
Social Changes / wPolityce.pl	26 Feb–1 Mar	1,071	**28**		22	11	3	4	9	21	2	6
IBRiS / Onet	27–28 Feb	1,100	**32.9**		18.2	10.1	5.9		5.0	17.3	10.6	14.7
IBSP	25–26 Feb	1,001	26.96		18.85	9.34	3.23		6.96	**31.26**	3.40 (Note: AGROunia - 3.01)	4.30
Estymator / DoRzeczy.pl	25–26 Feb	1,041	**37.6**		19.2	11.4	5.5	2.1	6.9	17.1	0.2	18.4
Social Changes / wPolityce.pl	19–22 Feb	1,076	**33**		26	13	3	4	10		11	7
Social Changes / wPolityce.pl	19–22 Feb	1,076	**30**		19	12	2	4	8	23	2	7
United Surveys / WP.pl	19 Feb	1,000	**33.5**		19.3	11.4	5.8		6.0	14.6	9.3	14.2
PGB Opinium	15–16 Feb	1,100	**31.2**		19.0	7.5	4.9	0.5	8.2	20.6	8.0	10.6
Social Changes / wPolityce.pl	12–15 Feb	1,095	**33**		24	15	3	3	9		13	9
Social Changes / wPolityce.pl	12–15 Feb	1,095	**30**		17	12	3	3	10	23	2	7
Estymator / DoRzeczy.pl	12–13 Feb	1,022	**37.4**		21.5	9.7	5.4	2.4	7.1	16.2	0.3	15.9
IPSOS / OKO.press	10–12 Feb	1,014	**29**		20	10	4		10	20	7	9
CBOS	1–11 Feb	1,179	**33.2**		12.4	4.4	2.0	1.0	5.5	19.2	22.3	14.0
Kantar	5–10 Feb	676	**31**		18	7	4	2	7	15	17	13
Social Changes / wPolityce.pl	5–8 Feb	1,051	**30**		25	11	4	6	10		14	5
Social Changes / wPolityce.pl	5–8 Feb	1,051	**29**		20	10	2	5	9	23	2	6
IBRiS / "Rz"	5–6 Feb	1,100	**32**		19	8	5		6	18	12	13
United Surveys / WP.pl	5 Feb	1,000	**33.5**		19.7	8.0	5.6		7.0	15.0	11.2	13.8
Kantar	29 Jan–3 Feb	980	**29**		23	6	4	2	5	14	17	6
Social Changes / wPolityce.pl	29 Jan–1 Feb	1,074	**34**		23	12	2	4	9		16	11
Social Changes / wPolityce.pl	29 Jan–1 Feb	1,074	**31**		17	9	2	3	9	27	2	4
Pollster / SE.pl	29 Jan–1 Feb	1,081	**41.42**		23.21	9.73	3.59		5.64	15.25		18.21
IBRiS / Onet	30–31 Jan	1,100	**31.1**		19.2	8.9	5.5		7.4	16.9	11.1	11.9
Estymator / DoRzeczy.pl	28–29 Jan	1,029	**38.4**		21.8	11.1	5.2	2.0	6.7	14.6	0.2	16.6
IBSP	25–26 Jan	1,001	26.96		20.24	7.56	2.61		10.99	**27.70**	3.94 (Note: AGROunia - 3.67)	0.74
Social Changes / wPolityce.pl	22–25 Jan	1,066	**31**		26	12	5	4	10		12	5
Social Changes / wPolityce.pl	22–25 Jan	1,066	**29**		21	9	4	3	8	24	2	5
IBRiS / WP.pl	23 Jan	1,100	**30.0**		19.6	9.5	5.0		7.5	17.5	10.9	10.4
United Surveys / DGP, RMF	22 Jan	1,000	**32.5**		20.9	10.2	3.6		4.6	16.2	12.0	11.6
PGB Opinium	20–21 Jan	1,100	**34.7**		20.8	8.6	5.5	0.9	6.5	14.3	8.8	13.9
Social Changes / wPolityce.pl	15–18 Jan	1,097	**33**		29	12	3	4	11		8	4
Social Changes / wPolityce.pl	15–18 Jan	1,097	**30**		22	10	2	3	10	22	1	8
Estymator / DoRzeczy.pl	14–15 Jan	1,020	**39.6**		22.1	10.2	6.6	2.3	6.0	12.9	0.3	17.5
CBOS	4–14 Jan	1,150	**35.2**		13.7	5.0	2.0	1.0	5.3	18.2	19.6	17.0
Social Changes / wPolityce.pl	8–11 Jan	1,085	**35**		27	12	3	4	10		9	8
Social Changes / wPolityce.pl	8–11 Jan	1,085	**32**		23	9	2	3	8	22	1	9
IBRiS / "Rz"	8–9 Jan	1,100	**33.2**		20.6	7.7	5.2		6.4	12.6	14.3	12.6
Social Changes / wPolityce.pl	1–5 Jan	1,090	**33**		29	12	4	4	9		9	4
Social Changes / wPolityce.pl	1–5 Jan	1,090	**31**		24	10	2	4	7	19	3	7

=== 2020 ===
Polling firm/Link	Fieldwork date	Sample size	United Right	Civic Coalition		The Left	Polish Coalition	Kukiz'15	Confederation	Poland 2050	Others / Don't know	Lead
Estymator / DoRzeczy.pl	28–29 Dec	1,031	39.2	23.6		10.9	7.4		4.8	12.9	1.2	15.6
Social Changes / wPolityce.pl	25–28 Dec	1,040	35	25		13	3	5	9		10	10
Social Changes / wPolityce.pl	25–28 Dec	1,040	33	19		11	3	4	8	20	2	13
IBRiS / WP.pl	21–22 Dec	1100	33.2	23.6		8.9	6.0		4.5	9.1	14.7	9.7
Social Changes / wPolityce.pl	18–21 Dec	1,096	33	26		14	2	5	9		11	7
Social Changes / wPolityce.pl	18–21 Dec	1,096	31	20		11	4	2	10	20	2	11
IBRiS / Onet.pl	16 Dec	1,100	33.0	22.3		7.1	6.1		4.9	11.0	15.5 (Note: AGROunia – 2)	10.7
Social Changes / wPolityce.pl	11–14 Dec	1,092	36	26		12	4	3	10		9	10
Social Changes / wPolityce.pl	11–14 Dec	1,092	34	20		10	4	3	8	19	2	14
Pollster / SE.pl	12 Dec	1,067	40.05	26.29		8.52	5.27		6.03	12.44	1.40	13.76
IBRiS / WP.pl	11–12 Dec	1,100	34.0	23.4		9.7	6.2		4.0	14.4	8.3	10.6
Estymator / DoRzeczy.pl	10–11 Dec	1,023	38.3	24.9		10.9	5.7	2.4	4.4	13.2	0.2	13.4
PGB Opinium	9–10 Dec	1,100	33.7	23.8		9.0	4.8	0.7	5.9	13.6	8.6	9.9
CBOS	30 Nov–10 Dec	1,010	31.1	18.1		3.9	2.0	2.0	5.1	15.6	22.2	13.0
Kantar Public	4–9 Dec	987	25	**25**		8	5	2	6	13	16	Tie
Social Changes / wPolityce.pl	4–8 Dec	1,079	31	27		13	3	3	10		13	4
Social Changes / wPolityce.pl	4–8 Dec	1,079	28	22		11	3	3	10	22	1	6
	26 Nov	**The Polish Coalition parts ways with member party Kukiz'15**										
Social Changes / wPolityce.pl	27–30 Nov	1,079	32	28		14	3		11		12	4
Social Changes / wPolityce.pl	27–30 Nov	1,079	29	21		12	3		10	23	2	6
United Surveys / DGP, RMF	27–28 Nov	1,000	33.6	23.0		9.8	6.1		4.7	11.8	11.0	10.6
IBRiS / WP.pl	27 Nov	1,100	32.7	22.4		10.1	5.8		5.4	12.6	11.0	10.3
Estymator / DoRzeczy.pl	26–27 Nov	1,019	36.9	27.4		9.6	4.8		5.2	15.8	0.3	9.5
IPSOS / OKO.press	23–25 Nov	1,000	29	23		10	4		9	20	5	6
Kantar Public / TVN	20–23 Nov	1,003	27	25		8	4		7	14	15	2
Social Changes / wPolityce.pl	20–23 Nov	1,058	33	26		13	5		10		13	7
Social Changes / wPolityce.pl	20–23 Nov	1,058	32	21		10	4		9	21	3	11
Social Changes / wPolityce.pl	13–16 Nov	1,049	32	31		12	6		8		11	1
Social Changes / wPolityce.pl	13–16 Nov	1,049	28	24		10	6		7	22	3	4
CBOS	5–15 Nov	1,052	29.8	16.3		6.0	2.5		6.8	16.3	22.3	13.5
IBRiS / WP.pl	13–14 Nov	1,100	33.0	24.1		8.4	5.0		2.3	13.1	14.0	8.9
Estymator / DoRzeczy.pl	12–13 Nov	1,025	36.8	29.3		9.4	4.6		6.6	12.7	0.6	7.5
Kantar Public	6–12 Nov	981	30	24		6	6		6	13	15	6
Social Changes / wPolityce.pl	6–9 Nov	1,088	32	29		15	7		9		8	3
Social Changes / wPolityce.pl	6–9 Nov	1,088	31	21		12	5		8	22	1	9
IBRiS / Onet	3 Nov	1,100	28.7	24.7		7.0	5.1		5.1	11.3	18.0	4.0
Social Changes / wPolityce.pl	30 Oct–2 Nov	1,080	30	27		14	6		10		13	3
United Surveys / RMF	31 Oct	1,000	30.9	25.3		6.0	2.7		4.9	14.7	15.4	5.6
IBRiS / "Rz"	30–31 Oct	1,100	28.0	23.1		6.2	2.8		4.4	14.9	20.6	4.9
IBRiS / WP.pl	30 Oct	1,100	29.0	24.0		6.9	3.3		5.3	14.9	16.6	5.0
Estymator / DoRzeczy.pl	29–30 Oct	1,017	33.4	26.8		10.4	4.1		8.7	13.0	3.6	6.6
CBOS	19–29 Oct	1,040	31.3	18.1		6.9	3.7		8.1	9.7	22.2	13.2
Pollster / SE.pl	27–28 Oct	1,022	37.83	31.57		9.76	5.12		5.98	8.35	1.39	6.26
PGB Opinium	26–28 Oct	1,100	32.6	25.5		8.2	4.1		9.3	12.8	7.5	7.1
Kantar Public / "GW"	26–27 Oct	1,000	26	24		8	3		8	18	13	2
Social Changes / wPolityce.pl	23–26 Oct	1,069	37	26		13	6		11		7	11
Estymator / DoRzeczy.pl	22–23 Oct	1,021	39.8	27.0		7.0	4.3		9.2	12.2	0.5	12.8
	22 Oct	**Constitutional Tribunal's landmark decision on abortions, sparking protests**										
IBRiS / Onet.pl	20 Oct	1,100	37.0	26.8		7.5	3.8		7.2	8.7	9.0	10.2
Social Changes / wPolityce.pl	16–19 Oct	1,069	39	26		11	7		12		5	13
IBRiS / WP.pl	16 Oct	1,100	36.1	28.2		6.4	2.5		7.8	9.4	9.6	7.9
Social Changes / wPolityce.pl	9–12 Oct	1,083	36	27		14	5		12		6	9
CBOS	28 Sep–8 Oct	1,133	40.4	15.7		5.3	3.1		8.1	7.7	19.7	24.7
Kantar Public	2–7 Oct	977	36	28		7	4		5	9	9	8
Social Changes / wPolityce.pl	2–5 Oct	1,076	36	20		13	4		10	15	2	16
Social Changes / wPolityce.pl	2–5 Oct	1,076	38	24		14	6		11		7	14
IBRiS / WP.pl	2 Oct	1,100	41.6	22.1		7.2	4.0		7.5	9.0	8.5	19.5
Social Changes / wPolityce.pl	25–28 Sep	1,067	42	25		11	7		9		6	17
Estymator / DoRzeczy.pl	25–26 Sep	1,014	42.9	25.6		6.4	5.2		8.2	11.4	0.3	17.3
Estymator / DoRzeczy.pl	25–26 Sep	1,014	43.6	29.2		8.9	6.8		9.8		1.7	14.4
Social Changes / wPolityce.pl	18–21 Sep	1,058	40	27		15	5		9		4	13
Social Changes / wPolityce.pl	18–21 Sep	1,058	37	20		12	5		10	15	1	17
United Surveys / RMF	18–19 Sep	1,000	40.5	23.3		6.0	5.0		6.7	9.1	9.4	17.2
IBRiS / WP.pl	18 Sep	1,100	40.9	22.4		5.4	3.2		8.1	11.2	8.8	18.5
CBOS	7–17 Sep	1,149	40.7	22.0		5.1	2.7		7.6		21.9	18.7
Social Changes / wPolityce.pl	11–14 Sep	1,055	42	26		10	7		8		7	16
Kantar Public	4–9 Sep	977	39	26		4	4		6	11	10	13
Social Changes / wPolityce.pl	4–7 Sep	1,095	42	25		12	6		9		6	17
Social Changes / wPolityce.pl	4–7 Sep	1,095	37	7 (Note: The Civic Coalition and "Rafał Trzaskowski's movement" or New Solidarity (later branded Wspólna Polska) were counted separately)	20	4	3		7	22	0	15
IBRiS / WP.pl	4–5 Sep	1,100	41.3	28.6		6.7	5.9		8.4		9.1	12.7
Social Changes / wPolityce.pl	28–31 Aug	1,078	42	26		11	7		8		6	16
Social Changes / wPolityce.pl	28–31 Aug	1,078	36	6	20	4	3		7	23	1	13
CBOS	18–27 Aug		44	19	0.2	4	3		8	2.3	19.5	25
Social Changes / wPolityce.pl	21–24 Aug	1,062	41	25		13	6			9	6	16
Social Changes / wPolityce.pl	21–24 Aug	1,062	36	5	20	5	2		9	23	1	11
IBRiS / WP.pl	21–22 Aug	1,100	38.6	23.8		5.1	5.4		7.3	8.4	11.4	14.8
United Surveys / RMF	21 Aug	1,100	41.3	22.5	6.8	3.2	2.4		6.7	7.1	10.1	12
Social Changes / wPolityce.pl	14–17 Aug	1,078	43	26		11	6		9		5	17
Estymator / DoRzeczy.pl	13–14 Aug	1,022	44.0	29.8		9.6	6.9		8.5		1.2	14.2
Estymator / DoRzeczy.pl	13–14 Aug	1,022	42.1	25.9		7.3	5.2		6.8	12.4	0.3	16.2
Kantar Public	7–12 Aug	971	38	23	5	6	3		4	5	16	15
Social Changes / wPolityce.pl	7–10 Aug	1,078	43	29		11	4		8		5	14
IBRiS / WP.pl	6–7 Aug	1,100	36.0	31.0		9.1	5.0		6.7		12.2	5.0
IBRiS / WP.pl	6–7 Aug	1,100	34.3	27.1		5.6	2.8		6.1	11.7	12.3	7.2
Social Changes / wPolityce.pl	31 Jul–3 Aug	1,081	41	30		11	6		8		4	11
Social Changes / wPolityce.pl	31 Jul–3 Aug	1,081	39	21		9	3		7	20	1	18
IBRiS / KO	29 Jul	1,100	36	33		6	5		6		14	3
Social Changes / wPolityce.pl	24–27 Jul	1,062	43	29		8	7		9		4	14
IBRiS / WP.pl	24–25 Jul	1,100	39.2	26.5		9.8	5.1		9.3		10.1	12.7
IBRiS / WP.pl	24–25 Jul	1,100	38.8	25.6		4.8	2.0		6.6	11.8	10.4	13.2
Estymator / DoRzeczy.pl	23–24 Jul	1,034	43.9	30.8		9.4	6.5		8.8		0.6	13.1
Estymator / DoRzeczy.pl	23–24 Jul	1,034	41.5	24.7		8.7	5.4		7.9	11.4	0.4	16.8
Social Changes / wPolityce.pl	17–20 Jul	1,076	42	28		10	5		11		4	14
Social Changes / wPolityce.pl	17–20 Jul	1,076	39	19		6	3		9	23	1	16
United Surveys / RMF	18 Jul	1,100	37.5	29.1		8.0	5.4		8.7		11.3	8.4
IBRiS / Onet	17–18 Jul	1,100	39.7	28.1		9.9	5.8		8.0		8.6	11.6
Presidential election, 2nd round	12 Jul	20,458,911	51.03	48.97		-	-		-	-	-	2.06
Pollster / SE.pl	8–9 Jul	1,058	41.40	23.02		9.98	4.24		8.54	12.12	0.70	18.38
CBOS	30 Jun–9 Jul	1,339	42.3	23.9		5.7	3.2		7.2		17.7	28.4
IBRiS / Onet	4 Jul	1,100	38.0	23.6		7.3	5.2		7.3	11.9	6.8	14.4
Presidential election, 1st round	28 Jun	19,425,459	43.50	30.46		2.22	2.46		6.78	13.87	0.79	13.04
Social Changes / wPolityce.pl	26–27 Jun	1,045	42	25		14	8		9		2	17
Social Changes / wPolityce.pl	26–27 Jun	1,045	41	20		9	5		6	18	1	21
IBSP	25–26 Jun	1,092	43.85	30.94		8.88	6.15		9.75		0.43	12.91
CBOS	15–25 Jun	1,378	44.2	23.9		6.6	4.1		5.6		15.6	20.3
IPSOS / OKO.press	22–23 Jun	1,017	35	23		9	8		10		16	12
Social Changes / wPolityce.pl	19–23 Jun	1,066	40	30		13	7		8		2	10
Social Changes / wPolityce.pl	19–23 Jun	1,066	38	20		11	4		7	19 (Note: Respondents were suggested "Szymon Hołownia's party", then unregistered.)	1	18
Estymator / DoRzeczy.pl	18–19 Jun	1,017	42.8	28.4		9.6	10.4		7.5		0.3	14.4
Pollster / SE.pl	16–17 Jun	1,047	41.3	29.6		10.7	9.1		8.8		0.5	11.7
IPSOS / OKO.press	15–16 Jun	1,017	37	24		10	6		10		13	13
Social Changes / wPolityce.pl	12–16 Jun	1,065	39	28		13	9		8		3	11
Pollster / SE.pl	9–10 Jun	1,091	42.2	26.5		11.4	8.9		9.7		1.3	15.7
Kantar Public	5–10 Jun	986	37	31		7	7		7		10	6
Social Changes / wPolityce.pl	5–9 Jun	1,069	42	26		13	9		8		2	16
Kantar Public / PO	8 Jun	1,000	36	29		8	5		10		12	7
Estymator / DoRzeczy.pl	3–4 Jun	1,022	42.6	27.4		10.1	11.4		7.2		1.3	15.2
CBOS	22 May–4 Jun	1,308	46.4	19.7		5.1	5.0		5.8		18.0	26.7
Social Changes / wPolityce.pl	29 May–2 Jun	1,058	43	24		13	8		9		3	19
IBRiS / "Rz"	29 May	1,100	41.0	24.3		9.0	11.2		7.5		7.0	16.7
Pollster / SE.pl	26–27 May	1,038	39.9	26.0		14.1	9.4		9.5		1.1	13.9
Social Changes / wPolityce.pl	22–25 May	1,056	42	24		14	9		9		2	18
IBRiS / WP.pl	22–23 May	1,100	40.3	23.4		8.1	13.4		6.6		8.2	16.9
Estymator / DoRzeczy.pl	21–22 May	1,100	41.9	26.1		11.6	11.9		6.6		1.9	15.8
Kantar Public	18–19 May	954	37	23		8	7		11		14	14
Social Changes / wPolityce.pl	11–18 May	1,062	47	21		14	8		7		3	26
Pollster / SE.pl	15–17 May	1,089	38.5	24.5		13.6	12.6		9		1.8	14.0
Estymator / DoRzeczy.pl	14–15 May	1,025	45.8	17.3		12.8	14.1		8.9		1.1	28.5
Estymator / DoRzeczy.pl	14–15 May	1,025	44.1	13.4		10.2	12.9		8.8	10.6	0	30.7
Kantar Public / KO	14 May	1,000	41.1	29.7		10.3	8.0		9.7		1.2	11.4
Social Changes / wPolityce.pl	12–14 May	1,070	47	18		12	11		9		3	29
IBRiS / Onet	8–9 May	1,100	37.7	15.6		8.2	12.8		8.7		17.0	22.1
Kantar Public / KO	8 May	1,000	39.3	28.5		13.0	9.4		8.9		0.9	10.8
Social Changes / wPolityce.pl	6–7 May	1,073	52	17		12	8		10		1	35
Pollster / SE.pl	30 Apr–4 May	1,109	40.2	23.7		14.7	11.0		9.4		1.0	16.5
IPSOS / OKO.press	27–29 Apr	1,016	38	16		10	8		8		20 (Note: Nonpartisan Local Government Activists – 6)	22
Social Changes / wPolityce.pl	24–27 Apr	1,081	52	17		12	8		9		2	35
Estymator / DoRzeczy.pl	23–24 Apr	1,018	42.7	19.7		14.4	15.8		7.2		0.2	23.0
Social Changes / wPolityce.pl	17–20 Apr	1,063	53	17		12	7		10		1	36
Kantar Public	16–17 Apr	954	36	21		11	12		8		12	15
Social Changes / wPolityce.pl	10–13 Apr	1,060	52	15		11	8		11		3	37
Estymator / DoRzeczy.pl	8–9 Apr	1,023	45.4	20.4		15.9	12.6		5.4		0.3	25.0
Pollster / SE.pl	6–7 Apr	1,054	44.0	22.4		15.7	8.7		7.7		1.5	21.6
Social Changes / wPolityce.pl	3–6 Apr	1,064	49	18		14	10		9		0	31
IBSP / wp.pl	31 Mar–2 Apr	1,002	42.0	27.1		12.5	9.6		8.7		0.1	14.9
Social Changes / wPolityce.pl	27–30 Mar	1,062	51	21		12	7		8		1	30
Estymator / DoRzeczy.pl	25–26 Mar	1,032	44.3	22.9		15.0	12.3		5.2		0.3	21.4
Social Changes / wPolityce.pl	20–23 Mar	1,055	44	24		16	8		8		0	20
Pollster / SE.pl	17–18 Mar	1,077	41.9	23.8		15.4	10.2		8.2		0.5	18.1
Social Changes / wPolityce.pl	13–17 Mar	1,065	40	26		17	10		7		0	14
CBOS	5–15 Mar	919	49.1	20.6		7.7	7.0		6.9		8.7	28.5
Estymator / DoRzeczy.pl	12–13 Mar	1,028	42.0	25.3		15.2	10.3		6.5		0.7	16.7
IBSP / wp.pl	10–13 Mar	1,002	47.6	21.9		12.4	8.1		9.8		0.2	25.7
Kantar Public	6–11 Mar	981	41	28		10	7		5		9	13
Social Changes / wPolityce.pl	6–10 Mar	1,063	45	24		15	9		7		0	21
Social Changes / wPolityce.pl	28 Feb–2 Mar	1,052	41	26		18	7		8		0	15
Estymator / DoRzeczy.pl	27–28 Feb	1,031	41.7	28.6		13.4	9.6		6.2		0.5	13.1
Pollster / SE.pl	24–26 Feb	1,097	41.4	25.1		14.4	9.8		8.3		1.0	16.3
Social Changes / wPolityce.pl	21–24 Feb	1,090	41	25		16	8		9		1	16
IPSOS / OKO.press	20–22 Feb	1,013	38	26		13	7		8		8 (Note: Nonpartisan Local Government Activists – 3)	12
IBSP / wp.pl	18–20 Feb	1,000	38.4	30.9		13.4	7.9		9.0		0.4	7.5
Social Changes / wPolityce.pl	14–18 Feb	1,053	39	25		16	11		9		0	14
CBOS	6–16 Feb	994	44	24		9	5		6		12	20
Estymator / DoRzeczy.pl	12–13 Feb	1,009	40.6	29.8		13.2	9.3		6.4		0.7	10.8
Kantar Public	7–12 Feb	969	41	26		10	7		4		12	15
Social Changes / wPolityce.pl	7–11 Feb	1,085	42	25		15	8		8		2	17
IBRiS / "Rz"	7–8 Feb	1,100	35.9	27.2		15.6	7.3		6.3		7.7	8.7
Social Changes / wPolityce.pl	1–4 Feb	1,080	39	28		15	9		7		2	11
Kantar Public / TVN	29–30 Jan	1,000	35	30		13	7		7		8	5
Social Changes / wPolityce.pl	24–27 Jan	1,062	39	27		17	9		7		1	12
IBRiS / RMF	24–25 Jan	1,100	38	26		15	7		6		8	12
Estymator / DoRzeczy.pl	23–24 Jan	1,027	43.5	29.7		11.8	8.7		5.9		0.4	13.8
Pollster / SE.pl	22–23 Jan	1,091	40.5	27.4		14.7	8.3		8.5		0.7	13.1
Social Changes / wPolityce.pl	17–21 Jan	1,054	41	26		17	7		8		1	15
IBSP / wp.pl	14–16 Jan	1,001	37.8	31.3		13.3	7.4		9.7		0.5	6.5
Pollster / SE.pl	14–16 Jan	1,075	41.1	27.5		14.5	8.5		8.1		0.3	13.6
CBOS	9–16 Jan	1,069	44	23		10	7		5		11	21
Kantar Public	9–15 Jan	984	38	28		13	6		3		12	10
Social Changes / wPolityce.pl	10–14 Jan	1,057	42	23		18	8		8		1	19
IBRiS / "Rz"	10–11 Jan	1,100	37.3	26.9		12.9	4.7		5.0		13.2	10.4
Estymator / DoRzeczy.pl	9–10 Jan	1,018	45.4	28.2		10.5	8.6		6.4		0.9	17.2
Social Changes / wPolityce.pl	3–7 Jan	1,033	41	24		16	10		8		1	17

=== 2019 ===
Polling firm/Link	Fieldwork date	Sample size	United Right	Civic Coalition	The Left	Polish Coalition	Confederation	Others / Don't know	Lead
Social Changes / wPolityce.pl	27–31 Dec	1,042	41	23	17	8	9	2	18
Social Changes / wPolityce.pl	20–24 Dec	1,044	41	23	17	8	9	2	18
IBSP / wp.pl	22 Dec		39.1	27.9	16.1	7.0	9.8	0.1	11.2
Pollster / SE.pl	20–22 Dec	1,060	43.5	25.5	14.4	8.1	8.0	0.5	18.0
IBRiS / "Rz"	19–20 Dec	1,100	39.8	26.8	9.9	7.5	6.1	9.9	13.0
Estymator / DoRzeczy.pl	19–20 Dec	1,021	44.2	27.9	11.8	8.8	6.6	0.7	16.3
Kantar Public / TVN	17–18 Dec	1,003	41	27	12	7	7	6	14
Social Changes / wPolityce.pl	13–17 Dec	1,029	40	23	18	7	10	2	17
Kantar Public	6–11 Dec	971	39	26	11	8	6	10	13
Social Changes / wPolityce.pl	6–10 Dec	1,037	40	22	19	10	8	1	18
IBRiS / RMF	6–7 Dec	1,100	35	25	12	5	7	16	10
CBOS	28 Nov–5 Dec	971	45.2	21.7	11.2	6.2	6.3	9.4	23.5
Social Changes / wPolityce.pl	28 Nov–3 Dec	1,028	40	24	16	9	9	2	16
Kantar Public / PO	29–30 Nov	~1,000	35	28	14	9	12	2	7
Pollster / SE.pl	27 Nov		44.6	23.3	14.9	7.8	8.4	1.0	21.3
Social Changes / wPolityce.pl	22–26 Nov	1,037	40	24	18	10	6	2	16
IBRiS / "Rz"	22–23 Nov	1,100	39.6	24.8	12.8	6.0	6.2	10.6	14.8
Kantar Public	15–20 Nov	972	38	27	10	7	6	12	11
Social Changes / wPolityce.pl	15–19 Nov	1,029	40	25	17	8	9	1	15
CBOS	7–17 Nov	996	45.7	20.0	11.6	8.8	6.2	7.7	25.7
Social Changes / wPolityce.pl	8–12 Nov	1,028	42	25	15	9	8	1	17
Kantar Public / "WO"	5–12 Nov	1,502	38	27	14	7	9	5	11
Pollster / SE.pl	5–6 Nov	1,099	46.4	25.0	12.7	8.8	5.7	1.4	21.4
Social Changes / wPolityce.pl	1–5 Nov	1,033	43	24	17	8	7	1	19
CBM Indicator / TVP	31 Oct–4 Nov	1,000	44.0	26.1	14.4	8.8	6.2	0.5	17.9
Social Changes / wPolityce.pl	25–30 Oct	1,040	41.1	24.9	15.9	9.8	8.3	0.0	16.2
IPSOS / OKO.press	21–23 Oct	1,004	41	23	15	9	7	5 (Note: Nonpartisan local government activists – 1)	18
IBRiS / "Rz"	18–19 Oct	1,100	41.3	21.7	12.3	7.1	6.5	11.1	19.6
Kantar Public	11–16 Oct	986	39	27	14	7	7	6	12
Parliamentary election	13 Oct		43.6	27.4	12.6	8.6	6.8	1.0	16.2

=== Alternative scenarios ===
Polling firm/Link	Fieldwork date	Sample size	The Left	Civic Coalition	Polish Coalition	Poland 2050	Agreement	AGROunia	United Right	Kukiz'15	Confederation	Others / Don't know	Lead
Pollster / SE.pl	17 Jul 2023	–	8.60	30.52 (Note: Coalition with Yes! For Poland)	10.1			1.68	**33.07**		11.16	2.96 (Note: Nonpartisan Local Government Activists – 1.62)	2.55
Pollster / SE.pl	17 Jul 2023	–	9.79	**38.11**				1.73	33.89		12.25	4.23 (Note: Nonpartisan Local Government Activists – 3.06)	4.22
Pollster / SE.pl	17 Jul 2023	–	9.45	**38.95** (Note: Coalition with Yes! For Poland and Nonpartisan Local Government Activists)				2.29	34.49		13.66	1.16	4.46
United Surveys / WP.pl	7–9 Jul 2023	1,000	**47.5**; 230						37.1; 174		15.2; 55	0.2; 1	8.4
United Surveys / WP.pl	7–9 Jul 2023	1,000	12.0; 48	29.6; 148		7.5; 22			**34.6**; 177		14.9; 64	1.4; 1	5.0
Social Changes / wPolityce.pl	9–12 Jun 2023	1,030	9	**38**			1		37	1	10	4	1
United Surveys / DGP, RMF	21–23 Apr 2023	1,000	9.0; 34	24.2; 129	13.7; 68		0.2; 0		**32.3**; 188		9.8; 40	10.8; 1	8.1
Estymator / DoRzeczy.pl	20–21 Apr 2023	1,059	10.9; 40	25.7; 124	14.0; 62		0.3; 0		**35.0**; 193		10.0; 40	4.1 (Note: Nonpartisan Local Government Activists – 3.8); 1	9.3
PGB Opinium	17–19 Apr 2023	1,080	9.25	27.60	13.31		0.49		**35.55**		10.39	3.41 (Note: Nonpartisan Local Government Activists – 2.11)	7.95
Pollster / SE.pl	14–16 Apr 2023	1,120	**37.73**		11.85		1.27		33.38		11.68	4.09 (Note: Nonpartisan Local Government Activists – 3.14)	4.35
Pollster / SE.pl	14–16 Apr 2023	1,120	**47.72**				2.15		33.68		12.33	4.12 (Note: Nonpartisan Local Government Activists – 2.78)	14.04
United Surveys / WP.pl	14–16 Apr 2023	1,000	9.4; 37	25.1; 134	14.3; 68		0.4; 0		**33.1**; 183		9.3; 37	8.4; 1	8.0
Estymator / DoRzeczy.pl	4–5 Apr 2023	1,032	10.0	24.7	14.3		0.7		**35.8**		10.4	4.1 (Note: Nonpartisan Local Government Activists – 3.4)	10.7
United Surveys / WP.pl	31 Mar–2 Apr 2023	1,000	11.2; 49	23.1; 124	14.9; 73				**32.5**; 182		8.3; 31	10.0; 1	9.4
Estymator / DoRzeczy.pl	23–24 Mar 2023	1,048	8.8; 26	26.0; 127	14.1; 65		0.5; 0		**36.7**; 198		10.2; 43	3.7 (Note: Nonpartisan Local Government Activists – 3.0); 1	10.7
IPSOS / OKO.press, TOK FM	20–23 Mar 2023	1,000	9; 35	26; 137	10; 46		3; 0		**34**; 197		11; 44	7; 1	8
Social Changes / wPolityce.pl	17–20 Mar 2023	1,045	**38**		12		1		36	2	8	3	2
United Surveys / WP.pl	17–19 Mar 2023	1,000	9.7; 39	24.9; 132	14.7; 69		0.4; 0		**33.4**; 184		9.1; 35	7.8; 1	8.5
IBRiS / "Rz"	17–18 Mar 2023	1,100	9.1	25.5	15.3				**34.0**		8.8	7.3	8.5
IBRiS / Onet	13–14 Mar 2023	1,100	9.1	24.5	15.0				**34.0**		9.0	8.4	9.5
Kantar Public / "GW"	1–13 Mar 2023	1,000	27.4; 157		10.2; 51				**35.7**; 201		10.6; 51	18.1; 0	8.3
Kantar Public / "GW"	1–13 Mar 2023	1,000	9.1; 37	30.5; 178					**32.4**; 183		12.9; 62	15.1; 0	1.9
Kantar Public / "GW"	1–13 Mar 2023	1,000	**41.9**; 245						30.5; 167		10.7; 48	16.9; 0	11.4
Estymator / DoRzeczy.pl	8–9 Mar 2023	1,025	8.6; 28	26.5; 129	14.7; 67		1.0; 0		**38.0**; 208		7.8; 27	3.4 (Note: Nonpartisan Local Government Activists – 3.1); 1	11.5
Estymator / DoRzeczy.pl	23–24 Feb 2023	1,037	8.8; 29	27.9; 137	15.0; 68		0.8; 0		**38.0**; 211		6.9; 14	2.6 (Note: Nonpartisan Local Government Activists – 2.5); 1	10.1
CBOS	6–19 Feb 2023	982	32.6						**35.3**		7.0	25.1	2.7
CBOS	6–19 Feb 2023	982	4.8	28.7					**34.6**		7.6	24.3	5.9
CBOS	6–19 Feb 2023	982	4.5	22.3		6.7			**35.3**		7.0	24.2	13.0
CBOS	6–19 Feb 2023	982	4.1	19.0	11.7				**34.8**		7.5	22.9	15.8
Social Changes / wPolityce.pl	10–13 Feb 2023	1,063	9	24	15		7		**32**	2	9	2	8
Pollster / SE.pl	10–11 Feb 2023	1,062	10.95	30.03	5.97	10.37	0.97		**32.17**	0.96	7.13	1.45	2.14
Pollster / SE.pl	10–11 Feb 2023	1,062	10.16	**34.30**		11.04	1.09		32.86	1.88	7.23	1.44	1.44
Pollster / SE.pl	10–11 Feb 2023	1,062	11.88	**41.78**			1.55		33.90	1.77	7.82	1.30	7.88
Estymator / DoRzeczy.pl	9–10 Feb 2023	1,021	8.6; 27	27.5; 137	15.8; 71		1.3; 0		**38.2**; 214		6.3; 10	2.3 (Note: Nonpartisan Local Government Activists – 2.2)	10.7
United Surveys / DGP, RMF	3–4 Feb 2023	1,000	**45.8**						37.0		8.4	8.8	8.8
United Surveys / DGP, RMF	3–4 Feb 2023	1,000	8.4	26.4	14.8				**34.6**		7.2	8.6	8.2
IBRiS / "Rz"	3–4 Feb 2023	1,100	8.8	32.0		6.9	1.5		**33.3**		5.3	12.3 (Note: Nonpartisan Local Government Activists – 2.2)	1.3
Pollster / SE.pl	28–29 Jan 2023	1,088	9.46	**41.73**			0.72		35.31	1.79	9.92	1.07	6.42
Pollster / SE.pl	28–29 Jan 2023	1,088	**50.62**				0.98		35.99	1.80	9.11	1.51	14.63
Estymator / DoRzeczy.pl	26–27 Jan 2023	1,035	9.5; 31	29.1; 138	13.5; 55				**38.9**; 207		8.4; 28	0.6; 1	9.8
United Surveys / DGP, RMF	22–23 Jan 2023	1,000	8.4	32.9		9.8			**34.3**		6.6	8.0	1.4
United Surveys / DGP, RMF	22–23 Jan 2023	1,000	9.2	**40.3**					35.2		7.8	7.5	5.1
Research Partner	13–16 Jan 2023	1,033	9.0	29.4	13.3		0.6		**35.4**	1.2	6.5	4.7	6.0

Polling firm/Link	Fieldwork date	Sample size	The Left	Civic Coalition		Poland 2050	Polish Coalition	Agreement	United Right	Kukiz'15	Confederation	Others / Don't know	Lead
United Surveys / WP.pl	2–4 Dec 2022	1,000	36.4; 253			14.2 (Note: Number of seats is counted with result of KO-Lewica coalition)			**36.7**; 193		5.8; 13	6.9; 1	0.3
United Surveys / WP.pl	2–4 Dec 2022	1,000	**48.3**; 248						37.2; 186		8.1; 25	6.4; 1	11.1
Pollster / SE.pl	21–22 Sep 2022	1,014	**50.49**						34,60		12.20	2.71	15.89
Social Changes / wPolityce.pl	17–20 Jun 2022	1,075	**50**					2	37		9	2	13
Kantar / "GW"	7–9 Jun 2022	1,000	**44**						31		7	18	13
Kantar / "GW"	7–9 Jun 2022	1,000	**42**				5		31		7	15	11
Kantar / "GW"	7–9 Jun 2022	1,000	29			18			**30**		6	18	1
United Surveys / DGP, RMF	6–7 Jun 2022	1,000	7.7; 28	25.1; 137		16.6; 84			**36.8**; 211		4.0; 0	9.8	11.7
Estymator / DoRzeczy.pl	28–29 May 2022	1,100	9.9	27.5		16.7			**41.2**		4.7		13.7
Pollster / SE.pl	24–25 May 2022	1,062	**49.79**						36.53		10.22	3.46	13.26
Social Changes / wPolityce.pl	20–23 May 2022	1,074	**47**					2	36	3	10	2	11
IPSOS / OKO.press	10–12 May 2022	1,014 (Note: All people interviewed.)	**50**; 263						30; 164		8; 32	12; 1	20
IPSOS / OKO.press	10–12 May 2022	670 (Note: People decided to vote.)	**52.6**						32.6		7.5	7.2	20.0
United Surveys / DGP, RMF	2–4 May 2022	1,000	33.1; 177			14.3; 65			**37.6**; 203		6.0; 15	9.0	4.5
United Surveys / DGP, RMF	2–4 May 2022	1,000	**42.4**; 234						39.7; 217		7.2; 9	10.7	2.7
Estymator / DoRzeczy.pl	12–14 Apr 2022	1,053	9.2; 27	25.2; 121		14.9; 66			**40.1**; 210		9.6; 35	1.0; 1	14.9
Social Changes / wPolityce.pl	8–11 Apr 2022	1,079	**43**					1	39	2	9	6 (Note: AGROunia – 5)	4
Social Changes / wPolityce.pl	21–24 Jan 2022	1,054	**50**					1	35	2	11	1	15
Kantar / KO	17-18 Jan 2022	1,000	6	**42**					30		10	11	12
Research Partner	17–21 Dec 2021	1,075	7.2	24.1		14.5		0.4	**33.0**	1.3	8.3	11.1	8.9
Social Changes / wPolityce.pl	26–29 Nov 2021	1,054	12	**38**					37			13	1
IBRiS / "Wydarzenia" Polsat	23 Nov 2021	1,100	**40.9**						32.5		8.4	18.4	8.4
IBRiS / "Wydarzenia" Polsat	23 Nov 2021	1,100	24.2			17.4			**32.4**		8.6	17.3	8.2
Kantar / "GW"	16–18 Nov 2021	1,002	7	**39**			4		28		11	10	11
IBRiS "Wydarzenia" Polsat	6 Oct 2021	1,100	**41.3**						36.4		9.8	12.5	4.9
IBRiS "Wydarzenia" Polsat	6 Oct 2021	1,100	25.8			14.0			**36.4**		8.4	15.2	10.6
Social Changes / wPolityce.pl	24–27 Sep 2021	1,059	9	26		18			**36**	2	8	1	10
IPSOS / "GW", OKO.press	21–23 Sep 2021	1,000	7; 20	**37**; 201			4; 0		34; 189		11; 49	6; 1	3
IBSP / Stan Polityki	1–3 Sep 2021	1,000	9.95; 34	**37.86**; 187					35.60; 186		9.84; 38	6.75 (Note: AGROunia – 6.42); 15	2.26
Social Changes / wPolityce.pl	20–23 Aug 2021	1,057	8	25		18	4		**32**	2	9	2	7
Pollster / SE.pl	30 Jul–2 Aug 2021	1,049	9.55	**39.09**				35.33		3.93	10.20	1.90	3.76
IBSP / Stan Polityki	21–23 Jul 2021	1,001	5.07; 7	20.38; 109	23.21 (Note: Party of Szymon Hołownia and Rafał Trzaskowski); 130		1.88; 0	**32.19**; 199			5.96; 14	11.31 (Note: AGROunia – 2.56); 1	2.26
Estymator / DoRzeczy.pl	20–21 May 2021	1,022	7.3	8.8	14.4	17.6	3.9	**38.6**			7.4	2.0	21.0
Research Partner	14–17 May 2021	1,098	4.9	8.1	**32.1**		2.1	31.5		1.6	7.2	12.5	0.6
IPSOS / OKO.press	26–28 Apr 2021	1,000	**49**; 253					32; 165			11; 41	8; 1	17
United Surveys / WP.pl	5 Mar 2021	1,000	8.7	14.2 (Note: Scenario with a "Polish Coalition", which would include the Polish People's Party, Agreement, and Civic Platform's breakaway conservative wing.)		12.1	11.6		**34.8**		4.8	13.8	20.6
Estymator / DoRzeczy.pl	20–21 Feb 2021	1,100	14.5; 61	17.1 (Note: Scenario with an extended "Polish Coalition", which would include the Polish People's Party, Agreement, Civic Platform's breakaway conservative wing, and Kukiz'15.); 82		13.9; 60	12.4; 53		**36.4**; 197		5.6; 6	0.1; 1	19.3
PGB Opinium	15–16 Feb 2021	1,100	**56.0**					33.6		10.3		5.5	22.4
IPSOS / OKO.press	10–12 Feb 2021	1,014	**57**; 280					29; 140			10; 39	4; 1	28

=== Parties ===
Polling firm/Link	Fieldwork date	Sample size	United Right				Civic Coalition				The Left		Third Way				K'15	Confederation			W	P	AU	Others	Don't know	Lead
Polling firm/Link	Fieldwork date	Sample size	United Right				Civic Coalition				The Left		Polish Coalition			Poland 2050	K'15	Confederation			W	P	AU	Others	Don't know	Lead
Polling firm/Link	Fieldwork date	Sample size	OdNowa	R	PiS	SP	PO	.N	IP	Z	NL	LR	PSL	UED	CdP	Poland 2050	K'15	KORWiN	RN	KKP	W	P	AU	Others	Don't know	Lead
Social Changes / wPolityce.pl	19–22 May 2023	2,099	–	–	36	3	29				7		4			6	2	10				1		2		7
IPSOS / DoRzeczy.pl	16–19 May 2023	1,000	–	–	34	3	25				9		11					10					2		6	9
United Surveys / DGP, RMF	5–7 May 2023	1,000	–	–	31.3	1.2	24.7				9.6		14.6					8.7							9.9	6.6
IPSOS / DoRzeczy.pl	13–16 Mar 2023	1,000	–	–	35	3	24				9		5			9		9					2		4	11
Social Changes / wPolityce.pl	10–13 Mar 2023	1,050	–	**34**		3	29				9		5			7	2	7				1		3		5
CBOS	9–22 Jan 2023	1,028	–	0.2	30.2	1.4	20.1	2.0	0.0	0.3	2.4	0.9	3.4	0.0	0.2	7.0	0.9	2.5	0.5	2.6	0.7	0.1	1.3	0.5 (Note: Democratic Left Association – 0.5, Polish Socialist Party – 0.0)	18.4	10.1
CBM Indicator	18–20 Jan 2023	1,000	–	–	32.1	2.9	26.2				8.8		5.0			8.4	0.9	6.4				1.6		0.8	6.9	5.9
Research Partner	30 Sep–3 Oct 2022	1,082	–	–	31.4	1.0	24.9				5.4		4.3			8.2	1.7	6.6				0.5	1.6	3.1 (Note: Democratic Left Association + Labour Union + Polish Socialist Party – 2.5)	11.2	6.5
Pollster / SE.pl	23–24 Aug 2022	1,029	–	0.16	34.02	1.93	26.73	1.15	–	–	7.72 (Note: Democratic Left Alliance – 6.55, Spring – 1.17)	1.02	6.27	–	–	13.49	1.11	5.77				0.35		0.28		7.29
IBSP	12–17 Aug 2022	800	0.00	–	29.41	2.53	23.20	1.43	0.37	1.12	6.56 (Note: Democratic Left Alliance – 4.95, Spring – 1.61)	2.71	3.99	0.49	–	16.98	1.63	5.53				0.53	3.52			6.21
Research Partner	12–15 Aug 2022	1,060	**30.3**			4.7	25.2				7.5		3.8			9.1	1.2	5.6				0.2		0.5	11.8	5.1
Research Partner	28 Jul–1 Aug 2022	1,030	**34.1**			3.6	25.6				7.0		5.3			7.8	2.2	5.9				0.4		0.3	7.9	8.5
IBRiS / "Rz"	29–30 Jul 2022	1,000	–	–	34.9	0.7	27.7				9.6		5.5			9.3		4.6					1.3		6.4	7.2
Pollster / SE.pl	21–22 Jun 2022	1,011	–	0.37	34.19	1.59	22.53	0.69	–	–	9.77		6.58			14.06	1.47	6.06				0.99		1.70 (Note: Had Enough 2023 – 1.43)		11.66

Polling firm/Link	Fieldwork date	Sample size	United Right				Civic Coalition				The Left			Polish Coalition		K'15	Confederation			Poland 2050	Others	Don't know	Lead
Polling firm/Link	Fieldwork date	Sample size	R	PiS	SP	P	PO	.N	IP	Z	SLD	W	LR	PSL	UED	K'15	KORWiN	RN	KKP	Poland 2050	Others	Don't know	Lead
IBRiS / "Wydarzenia" Polsat	6 Jul 2021	1,100	1.5	29.5	0.9	1.2	18.9				8.2			5.3			7.8			15.3		11.4	10.6
IBRiS / "Wydarzenia" Polsat	30 Jun 2021	1,100	0.0	30.3	1.2	1.4	16.8				10.1			5.1			8.2			17.4		9.5	12.9
Pollster / SE.pl	26–27 Jun 2021	1,088	—N/a	34.31	0.59	0.46	21.12				6.42			5.18			7.30			23.88	0.74		10.43
Pollster / SE.pl	5–6 Jun 2021	1,047	—N/a	35.29	1.06	0.54	17.79				6.52			5.65			9.70			22.99	0.46		12.30
Pollster / SE.pl	19–20 May 2021	1,013	—N/a	36.14	0.72	1.20	18.84				6.93			5.84			8.60			21.03	0.70		15.11
IBRiS / "Wydarzenia" Polsat	5 May 2021	1,100	—N/a	30.1	1.0	1.7	15.8				10.1			4.4			10.3			17.9		7.7	12.2
Kantar / TVN	28 Apr 2021	1,001	—N/a	25	1	2	21				8			3		3	7			21		9	4
Pollster / se.pl	20 Apr 2021	1,066	—N/a	33.89	1.63	0.95	16.86				9.66			5.58			8.89			21.38	1.00		12.51
IBRiS / "Wydarzenia" Polsat	20 Apr 2021	1,100	—N/a	30.1	2.2	1.6	17.3				10.6			4.4			7.3			15.5		11.0	12.8
United Surveys / WP.pl	16 Apr 2021	1,000	—N/a	30.3	2.1	1.4	17.0				8.2			5.0			5.7			17.0		13.8	13.3
United Surveys / DGP, RMF	9 Apr 2021	1,000	—N/a	30.2	2.2	1.8	16.2				10.3			5.0			4.7			16.7		13.0	13.5
CBM Indicator / "Rz"	25–30 Mar 2021	1,000	—N/a	26.1	5.2	1.6	15.9			0.4	8.2			5.1		1.2	6.1			17.8		12.4	8.3
Pollster / SE.pl	3–4 Mar 2021	1,033	—N/a	38.07	1.04	0.8	20.39				9.61			4.33			7.02			17.79	0.95		17.68
IBRiS / Fakt.pl	19 Jan 2021	1,100	—N/a	32.3	1.2	1.0	20.0				7.4			5.0			6.6			13.5		13.0	12.3
CBM Indicator / "Rz"	17–22 Dec 2020	1,000	—N/a	25.7	5.4	2.8	20.3				8.6			5.4		3.4	6.5			13.2		8.7	5.4
CBM Indicator / "Rz"	21–22 Sep 2020	603	—N/a	36.3	3.5	1.7	25.9				7.5			4.3			8.0				5.8	7.1	10.4
Pollster / SE.pl	21–22 Sep 2020	1,076	—N/a	39.3	2.4	0.7	24.2				8.4			5.7			8.5			9.9	0.9		15.1
IBRiS / "Rz"	19 Sep 2020	1,100	—N/a	36.0	1.4	1.4	21.8				6.1			3.4			8.2			9.2	12.5		14.2
United Surveys / RMF	18–19 Sep 2020	1,000	—N/a	35.7	1.5	1.3	21.2				6.2			4.5			7.0			9.8		12.8	14.5
IBRiS / WP.pl	18 Sep 2020	1,100	—N/a	35.0	1.5	1.2	21.8				5.8			3.0			8.2			10.6		12.9	13.2
IBRiS / ZET	4 May 2020	1,100	—N/a	40.5	0.6	0.8	16.4				8.2			10.3			8.7					14.5	24.1
Social Changes / wPolityce.pl	1–5 Nov 2019	1,033	—N/a	38			20	2	–	–	10	8	2	6	–	5	4	2	–		3 (Note: Federation for the Republic – 1)		18
Social Changes / wPolityce.pl	25–30 Oct 2019	1,040	—N/a	37.7			21.5	2.5	–	–	7.6	7.4	3.7	6.8	–	5.7	4.3	2.2	–		0.6 (Note: Federation for the Republic – 0.6)		16.2
IPSOS / OKO.press	21–23 Oct 2019	1,004	—N/a	35.7	3.3	1.2	17.5	2.5	1.4	1.1	4.9	5.5	4.1	6.4	–	1.9	3.1	1.9	1.3			8.2	18.2

== Seat projection ==
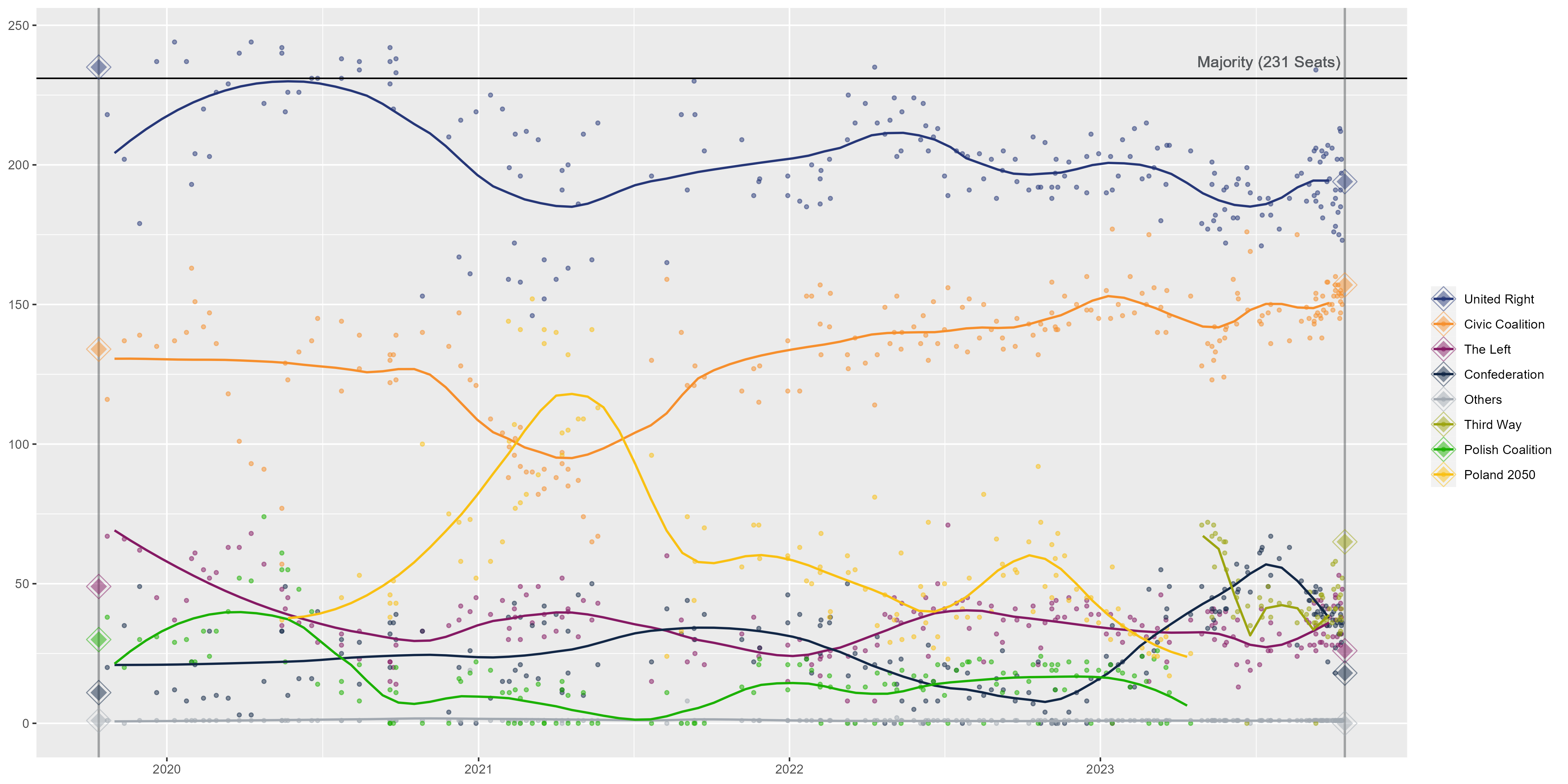
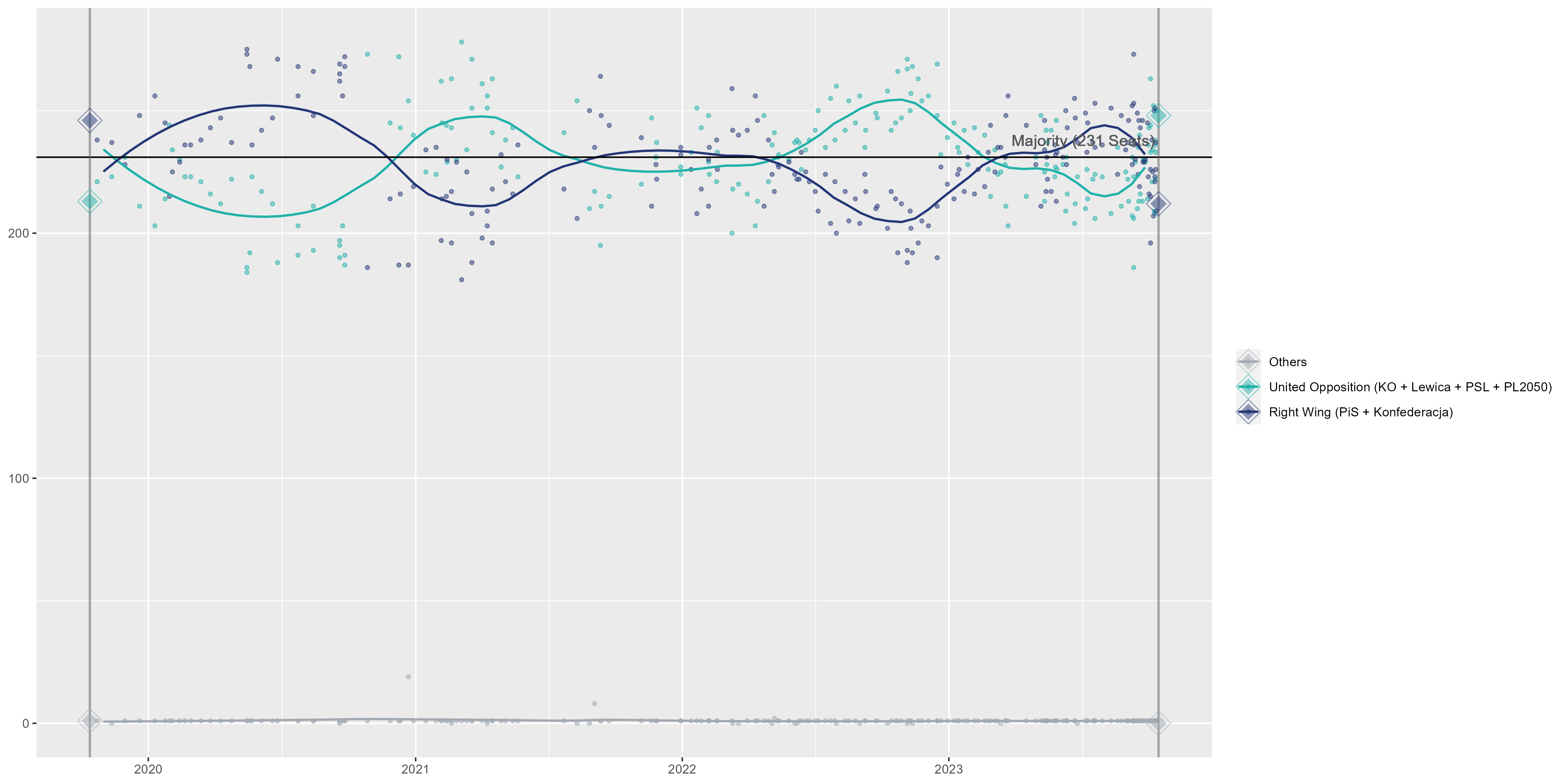

231 seats are needed for a Sejm majority, while 276 seats are needed for a three-fifths Sejm supermajority to override presidential vetoes.

Exit poll

Polling Firm/Link	Fieldwork Period	Sample Size	United Right	Civic Coalition	The Left	Third Way		Confederation	Others	Majority	KO+L+TD
Polling Firm/Link	Fieldwork Period	Sample Size	United Right	Civic Coalition	The Left	Polish Coalition	Poland 2050	Confederation	Others	Majority	KO+L+TD
Parliamentary election	15 Oct 2023		194	157	26	65		18	0	Hung	18
OGB	15 Oct 2023		178	155	38	63		25	1	Hung	26
IPSOS exit poll	15 Oct 2023	90,000	200	163	30	55		12	0	Hung	18
Kantar / TVN	10–12 Oct 2023	1,702	173	150	48	52		36	1	Hung	20
Estymator / DoRzeczy.pl	10–11 Oct 2023	1,095	202	153	32	37		35	1	Hung	Hung
IBRiS / Onet	10–11 Oct 2023	1,000	197	154	38	41		29	1	Hung	3
IBRiS / RMF, "Rz"	9–10 Oct 2023	1,100	185	151	41	46		36	1	Hung	8
United Surveys / WP.pl	8–10 Oct 2023	1,000	191	155	43	38		32	1	Hung	6
IPSOS / OKO.press, TOK FM	6–10 Oct 2023	1,000	212	147	28	33		39	1	Hung	Hung
Research Partner	6–9 Oct 2023	1,084	213	145	32	32		37	1	Hung	Hung
ewybory.eu	7 Sep–8 Oct 2023	10,007	175	154	53	45		32	1	Hung	32
Pollster / SE.pl	6–7 Oct 2023	1,022	183	157	28	49		42	1	Hung	3
Estymator / DoRzeczy.pl	5–6 Oct 2023	1,060	202	153	31	37		36	1	Hung	Hung
Opinia24 / "GW"	3–4 Oct 2023	1,000	178	160	45	58		18	1	Hung	33
IBRiS / Onet	3–4 Oct 2023	1,000	191	155	37	41		35	1	Hung	3
Kantar / TVN	2–4 Oct 2023	1,500	188	157	46	41		27	1	Hung	14
United Surveys / DGP, RMF	2 Oct 2023	1,000	176	153	42	48		40	1	Hung	13
United Surveys / WP.pl	30 Sep–1 Oct 2023	1,000	186	148	31	57		37	1	Hung	6
Estymator / DoRzeczy.pl	29–30 Sep 2023	1,051	206	150	28	36		39	1	Hung	Hung
IBRiS / Onet	27 Sep 2023	1,000	195	150	38	41		35	1	Hung	Hung
IPSOS / OKO.press, TOK FM	22–25 Sep 2023	1,000	207	158	41	31		22	1	Hung	Hung
United Surveys / WP.pl	22–24 Sep 2023	1,000	194	158	35	37		35	1	Hung	Hung
Estymator / DoRzeczy.pl	22–23 Sep 2023	1,054	204	147	28	38		42	1	Hung	Hung
IBRiS / Onet	20 Sep 2023	1,000	203	148	32	36		40	1	Hung	Hung
United Surveys / DGP, RMF	18–19 Sep 2023	1,000	181	153	42	45		38	1	Hung	10
Research Partner	15–18 Sep 2023	1,065	205	138	29	46		41	1	Hung	Hung
United Surveys / WP.pl	16–17 Sep 2023	1,000	185	145	44	46		39	1	Hung	5
Estymator / DoRzeczy.pl	15–16 Sep 2023	1,069	201	146	29	35		48	1	Hung	Hung
IBRiS / Onet	13 Sep 2023	1,000	190	147	44	38		40	1	Hung	Hung
United Surveys / WP.pl	11 Sep 2023	1,000	187	152	35	36		49	1	Hung	Hung
IPSOS / OKO.press, TOK FM	8–11 Sep 2023	1,000	234	154	32	0		39	1	4	Hung
IBSP / Stan Polityki	7–11 Sep 2023	1,000	206	146	26	34		47	1	Hung	Hung
IBRiS / "Rz"	8–9 Sep 2023	1,100	189	144	43	44		39	1	Hung	1
Estymator / DoRzeczy.pl	8–9 Sep 2023	1,075	205	143	28	36		47	1	Hung	Hung
Research Partner	1–4 Sep 2023	1,064	202	138	28	47		44	1	Hung	Hung
United Surveys / WP.pl	1–3 Sep 2023	1,000	193	145	36	41		44	1	Hung	Hung
IBRiS / Onet	30–31 Aug 2023	1,000	187	149	37	39		47	1	Hung	Hung
Estymator / DoRzeczy.pl	24–25 Aug 2023	1,022	197	144	27	40		51	1	Hung	Hung
United Surveys / WP.pl	18–20 Aug 2023	1,000	196	175	24	36		28	1	Hung	5
Estymator / DoRzeczy.pl	10–11 Aug 2023	1,017	188	137	28	43		63	1	Hung	Hung
United Surveys / WP.pl	29–30 Jul 2023	1,000	177	148	32	43		59	1	Hung	Hung
Estymator / DoRzeczy.pl	19–20 Jul 2023	1,002	186	136	26	44		67	1	Hung	Hung
IBRiS / Onet	19–20 Jul 2023	1,000	182	150	36	38		53	1	Hung	Hung
Research Partner	14–17 Jul 2023	1,084	188	147	26	49		49	1	Hung	Hung
IBSP / Stan Polityki	6–10 Jul 2023	800	182	146	30	38		63	1	Hung	Hung
United Surveys / WP.pl	7–9 Jul 2023	1,000	171	143	41	42		62	1	Hung	Hung
Estymator / DoRzeczy.pl	5–7 Jul 2023	1,043	188	144	21	45		61	1	Hung	Hung
Kantar Public / "GW"	26 Jun 2023	1,000	190	169	19	35		47	0	Hung	Hung
Estymator / DoRzeczy.pl	22–23 Jun 2023	1,052	193	148	22	42		54	1	Hung	Hung
IPSOS / OKO.press, TOK FM	19–22 Jun 2023	1,000	199	176	28	0		56	1	Hung	Hung
Research Partner	9–12 Jun 2023	1,039	195	152	13	51		48	1	Hung	Hung
United Surveys / WP.pl	9–11 Jun 2023	1,000	181	154	37	40		47	1	Hung	1
Estymator / DoRzeczy.pl	9–10 Jun 2023	1,043	193	143	21	45		57	1	Hung	Hung
IBRiS / Onet	6 Jun 2023	1,100	181	159	31	38		50	1	Hung	Hung
Research Partner	26–29 May 2023	1,045	192	142	29	55		41	1	Hung	Hung
United Surveys / WP.pl	26–28 May 2023	1,000	172	141	40	65		41	1	Hung	16
IBRiS / "Rz"	26–27 May 2023	1,000	184	138	28	61		48	1	Hung	Hung
Estymator / DoRzeczy.pl	25–26 May 2023	1,055	191	124	34	65		45	1	Hung	Hung
United Surveys / DGP, RMF	19–21 May 2023	1,000	177	137	39	66		40	1	Hung	12
IBRiS / Onet	16 May 2023	1,100	182	133	36	68		40	1	Hung	7
Research Partner	12–15 May 2023	1,053	197	142	30	56		34	1	Hung	Hung
United Surveys / WP.pl	12–14 May 2023	1,000	180	130	41	71		37	1	Hung	12
Estymator / DoRzeczy.pl	11–12 May 2023	1,070	201	135	40	19	19	45	1	Hung	Hung
Estymator / DoRzeczy.pl	11–12 May 2023	1,070	193	123	35	67		41	1	Hung	Hung
United Surveys / DGP, RMF	5–7 May 2023	1,000	177	136	40	72		34	1	Hung	18
United Surveys / WP.pl	27–30 Apr 2023	1,000	179	128	32	71		49	1	Hung	1

Polling Firm/Link	Fieldwork Period	Sample Size	United Right	Civic Coalition	The Left	Polish Coalition	Kukiz'15	Confederation	Poland 2050	Others	Majority	KO+L+KP +P2050
Estymator / DoRzeczy.pl	20–21 Apr 2023	1,059	203	133	38	21	0	47	17	1	Hung	Hung
Research Partner	14–17 Apr 2023	1,047	205	153	37	0	0	39	25	1	Hung	Hung
Estymator / DoRzeczy.pl	4–5 Apr 2023	1,032	202	129	37	20	0	45	26	1	Hung	Hung
United Surveys / WP.pl	31 Mar–2 Apr 2023	1,000	187	133	46	17		41	35	1	Hung	1
Estymator / DoRzeczy.pl	23–24 Mar 2023	1,048	199	140	29	20	0	40	31	1	Hung	Hung
IPSOS / OKO.press, TOK FM	20–23 Mar 2023	1,000	207	146	29	11		49	17	1	Hung	Hung
IBSP	18–20 Mar 2023	1,000	207	155	22	0		41	34	1	Hung	Hung
United Surveys / WP.pl	17–19 Mar 2023	1,000	193	140	37	20		38	31	1	Hung	Hung
Kantar Public / "GW"	1–13 Mar 2023	1,000	180	149	46	0		55	30	0	Hung	Hung
Estymator / DoRzeczy.pl	8–9 Mar 2023	1,025	206	140	34	26	0	29	24	1	Hung	Hung
United Surveys / WP.pl	3–5 Mar 2023	1,000	199	156	31	23		26	24	1	Hung	4
IBSP	24–27 Feb 2023	1,000	196	175	15	0		48	25	1	Hung	Hung
Estymator / DoRzeczy.pl	23–24 Feb 2023	1,037	215	150	31	15	0	18	30	1	Hung	Hung
United Surveys / WP.pl	17–19 Feb 2023	1,000	195	154	35	24		24	27	1	Hung	10
Estymator / DoRzeczy.pl	9–10 Feb 2023	1,021	213	147	37	17	0	13	32	1	Hung	3
United Surveys / WP.pl	3–5 Feb 2023	1,000	203	160	38	13		13	32	1	Hung	13
Estymator / DoRzeczy.pl	26–27 Jan 2023	1,035	209	146	29	18	0	22	35	1	Hung	Hung
United Surveys / WP.pl	20–22 Jan 2023	1,000	196	150	32	19		21	41	1	Hung	12
IBSP	10–15 Jan 2023	800	191	177	0	0		35	56	1	Hung	3
Estymator / DoRzeczy.pl	12–13 Jan 2023	1,029	203	145	39	21	0	21	30	1	Hung	5
United Surveys / WP.pl	6–8 Jan 2023	1,000	190	155	32	18		24	40	1	Hung	15
Estymator / DoRzeczy.pl	29–30 Dec 2022	1,022	204	145	39	19	0	16	36	1	Hung	9
IPSOS / OKO.press, TOK FM	19–21 Dec 2022	1,000	211	148	39	0		16	45	1	Hung	2
United Surveys / WP.pl	16 Dec 2022	1,000	190	160	42	22		0	45	1	Hung	39
Estymator/ DoRzeczy.pl	15–16 Dec 2022	1,039	203	148	44	19	0	8	37	1	Hung	18
United Surveys / WP.pl	2–4 Dec 2022	1,000	192	150	41	17		11	48	1	Hung	26
Estymator / DoRzeczy.pl	24–25 Nov 2022	1,041	201	143	45	22	0	4	44	1	Hung	24
United Surveys / WP.pl	18–20 Nov 2022	1,000	196	153	38	12		0	60	1	Hung	33
United Surveys / DGP, RMF	10–12 Nov 2022	1,000	192	141	38	21		0	68	0	Hung	38
Estymator/ DoRzeczy.pl	9–10 Nov 2022	1,055	202	141	44	19	0	0	53	1	Hung	27
IPSOS / OKO.press	7–9 Nov 2022	1,015	197	142	37	12		12	59	1	Hung	20
United Surveys / WP.pl	4–5 Nov 2022	1,000	188	147	41	19		0	64	1	Hung	41
IBRiS / "Rz"	4–5 Nov 2022	1,100	192	158	43	21		1	45	0	Hung	37
Estymator / DoRzeczy.pl	27–28 Oct 2022	1,055	208	141	36	21	0	4	49	1	Hung	17
United Surveys / WP.pl	21–23 Oct 2022	1,000	192	143	27	24		0	72	1	Hung	36
IBSP	17–20 Oct 2022	800	192	132	21	0		22	92	1	Hung	15
Estymator / DoRzeczy.pl	13–14 Oct 2022	1,033	210	139	42	21	0	7	40	1	Hung	12
United Surveys / WP.pl	7–9 Oct 2022	1,000	191	143	35	15		11	65	0	Hung	28
United Surveys / WP.pl	23–25 Sep 2022	1,000	194	145	37	11		17	54	1	Hung	17
Estymator / DoRzeczy.pl	22–23 Sep 2022	1,045	202	135	41	18	0	8	55	1	Hung	19
Estymator / DoRzeczy.pl	8–9 Sep 2022	1,031	205	134	37	18	0	12	53	1	Hung	12
IPSOS / OKO.press	6–8 Sep 2022	1,009	198	138	29	11		26	57	1	Hung	5
United Surveys / DGP, RMF	1 Sep 2022	1,000	188	144	32	14		16	66	0	Hung	26
Estymator / DoRzeczy.pl	25–26 Aug 2022	1,022	202	141	42	22	0	12	40	1	Hung	15
IBSP	12–17 Aug 2022	1,000	195	150	22	0		10	82	1	Hung	24
Estymator / DoRzeczy.pl	11–12 Aug 2022	1,037	204	138	43	23	0	13	38	1	Hung	12
United Surveys / WP.pl	29–31 Jul 2022	1,000	191	152	34	22		9	52	0	Hung	30
Estymator / DoRzeczy.pl	28–29 Jul 2022	1,022	203	133	45	22	0	18	38	1	Hung	8
United Surveys / WP.pl	22–23 Jul 2022	1,000	204	149	44	21		0	41	1	Hung	25
Estymator / DoRzeczy.pl	15–16 Jul 2022	1,039	205	135	43	19	0	19	38	1	Hung	5
ewybory.eu	1 Jun–6 Jul 2022	10,091	189	156	71	0		20	23	1	Hung	20
United Surveys / WP.pl	1–2 Jul 2022	1,000	196	141	41	10		21	50	1	Hung	12
Estymator / DoRzeczy.pl	23–24 Jun 2022	1,046	213	136	50	21	0	8	31	1	Hung	8
United Surveys / WP.pl	17–19 Jun 2022	1,000	210	151	41	15		15	27	1	Hung	4
IBSP / Stan Polityki	8–13 Jun 2022	1,000	205	130	24	0		28	72	1	Hung	Hung
Estymator / DoRzeczy.pl	9–10 Jun 2022	1,059	214	139	45	17	0	8	36	1	Hung	7
United Surveys / DGP, RMF	6–7 Jun 2022	1,000	222	146	34	12		0	46	0	Hung	8
United Surveys / WP.pl	3–4 Jun 2022	1,000	209	136	39	13		15	49	0 (Note: Mandates provided by poll source sum up to 461)	Hung	7
Estymator / DoRzeczy.pl	26–27 May 2022	1,041	224	142	40	17	0	5	31	1	Hung	Hung
Estymator / DoRzeczy.pl	12–13 May 2022	1,029	219	140	43	19	0	8	30	1	Hung	2
IPSOS / OKO.press	10–12 May 2022	1,014	205	134	36	0		23	61	1	Hung	1
United Surveys / WP.pl	6–7 May 2022	1,000	203	153	37	12		14	39	2	Hung	11
United Surveys / DGP, RMF	2–4 May 2022	1,000	224	140	45	14		0	37	0	Hung	6
Estymator / DoRzeczy.pl	28–29 Apr 2022	1,042	216	136	38	18	0	22	29	1	Hung	Hung
United Surveys / WP.pl	22–23 Apr 2022	1,000	211	149	39	14		0	46	1	Hung	18
Estymator / DoRzeczy.pl	12–14 Apr 2022	1,053	215	132	28	18	0	31	35	1	Hung	Hung
IBSP / Stan Polityki	7–11 Apr 2022	1,000	235	114	8	0		21	81	1	5	Hung
Estymator / DoRzeczy.pl	30–31 Mar 2022	1,031	222	129	26	13	0	20	48	1	Hung	Hung
United Surveys / DGP, RMF	18–19 Mar 2022	1,000	215	138	27	0		25	55	0	Hung	Hung
Estymator / DoRzeczy.pl	10–11 Mar 2022	1,022	225	127	24	13	0	17	54	0	Hung	Hung
IPSOS / OKO.press	8–10 Mar 2022	1,000	209	132	8	0		50	60	1	Hung	Hung
United Surveys / WP.pl	18 Feb 2022	1,000	188	154	26	13		38	40	1	Hung	3
Estymator / DoRzeczy.pl	16–17 Feb 2022	1,047	202	142	24	17		36	38	1	Hung	Hung
IBSP / Stan Polityki	3–7 Feb 2022	1,000	198	132	24	0		37	68	1	Hung	Hung
United Surveys / WP.pl	6 Feb 2022	1,000	195	143	17	13		35	56	1	Hung	Hung
IBRiS / "Rz.pl"	4–6 Feb 2022	1,100	186	157	23	14		25	54	1	Hung	18
United Surveys / DGP, RMF	27 Jan 2022	1,000	200	153	21	19		18	50	1	Hung	13
United Surveys / WP.pl	21 Jan 2022	1,000	185	153	24	23		23	51	1	Hung	21
IBRiS / Onet	13 Jan 2022	1,100	187	119	30	21		39	63	1	Hung	3
Estymator / DoRzeczy.pl	29–30 Dec 2021	1,029	196	119	28	21		36	59	1	Hung	Hung
IPSOS / OKO.press	28–30 Dec 2021	1,018	189	137	15	12		46	60	1	Hung	Hung
IBRiS / Onet	26–27 Nov 2021	1,100	195	128	27	23		27	59	1	Hung	7
Estymator / DoRzeczy.pl	25–26 Nov 2021	1,021	194	115	24	21		34	71	1	Hung	1
IBRIS / "Rz"	19–20 Nov 2021	1,100	189	127	38	11		22	71	1	Hung	17
Estymator / DoRzeczy.pl	5–6 Nov 2021	1,016	209	119	32	13		30	56	1	Hung	Hung
IPSOS / "GW", OKO.press	20–23 Sep 2021	1,000	205	124	21	0		39	70	1	Hung	Hung
Pollster / Salon24.pl	11–12 Sep 2021	1,027	218	128	25	0	0	30	58	1	Hung	Hung
Estymator / DoRzeczy.pl	10–11 Sep 2021	1,016	230	121	30	0	0	34	44	1	Hung	Hung
IBSP / Stan Polityki	1–3 Sep 2021	1,000	191	121	22	0		44	74	8 (Note: AGROunia – 7)	Hung	Hung
United Surveys / DGP, RMF	27 Aug 2021	1,000	218	140	37	0		32	33	0	Hung	Hung
ewybory.eu	1 Jul–10 Aug 2021	10,088	165	159	60	11		41	24	0	Hung	24
IBSP / Stan Polityki	21–23 Jul 2021	1,001	196	130	15	0		22	96	1	Hung	11
Estymator / DoRzeczy.pl	20–21 May 2021	1,022	215	67	43	0	0	21	113	1	Hung	Hung
IBSP / Stan Polityki	13–14 May 2021	1,001	166	65	37	0		50	141	1	Hung	13
United Surveys / WP.pl	4 May 2021	1,000	211	74	44	11	0	10	109	1	Hung	8
IPSoS / oko.press	26–28 Apr 2021	1,000	186	87	31	0		46	109	1	Hung	Hung
Stan Polityki	16 Apr 2021		163	91	40	0		33	132	1	Hung	33
Estymator / DoRzeczy.pl	15–16 Apr 2021	1,029	200	85	41	10	0	18	105	1	Hung	11
United Surveys / DGP, RMF	9 Apr 2021	1,000	198	97	38	12		11	104	0	Hung	21
United Surveys / DGP, RMF	9 Apr 2021	1,000	191	93	52	15		12	96	1	Hung	26
Stan Polityki	2 Apr 2021		159	88	33	0		39	140	1	Hung	31
Stan Polityki	19 Mar 2021		152	91	39	0		36	141	1	Hung	41
Kantar / "GW", OKO.press	17–19 Mar 2021	1,000	166	84	31	0		42	136	1	Hung	21
Estymator / DoRzeczy.pl	11–12 Mar 2021	1,025	209	82	49	14	0	16	89	1	Hung	4
Stan Polityki	5 Mar 2021		146	90	36	0		35	152	1	Hung	48
Estymator / DoRzeczy.pl	25–26 Feb 2021	1,041	212	90	46	12	0	17	82	1	Hung	Hung
Stan Polityki	19 Feb 2021		158	92	30	0		38	141	1	Hung	33
United Surveys / WP.pl	19 Feb 2021	1,000	196	106	49	9		21	79	0	Hung	13
Estymator / DoRzeczy.pl	12–13 Feb 2021	1,022	211	102	38	12	0	19	77	1	Hung	Hung
IPSOS / OKO.press	10–12 Feb 2021	1,014	172	96	41	0		43	107	1	Hung	14
IBRiS / "Rz"	5–6 Feb 2021	1,100	199	99	34	11		15	101	1	Hung	15
Stan Polityki	5 Feb 2021		159	88	30	0		38	144	1	Hung	32
Estymator / DoRzeczy.pl	28–29 Jan 2021	1,029	220	104	44	11	0	15	65	1	Hung	Hung
Estymator / DoRzeczy.pl	14–15 Jan 2021	1,020	225	109	39	19	0	9	58	1	Hung	Hung
Estymator / DoRzeczy.pl	28–29 Dec 2020	1,031	219	121	45	22		0	52	1	Hung	10
CBM Indicator / "Rz"	17–22 Dec 2020	1000	161	123	40	18	0	26	73	19 (Note: United Poland – 18)	Hung	24
Estymator / DoRzeczy.pl	10–11 Dec 2020	1,023	216	128	42	15	0	0	58	1	Hung	13
Kantar Public	4–9 Dec 2020	987	167	147	37	16	0	20	72	1	Hung	42
	26 Nov 2020	The Polish Coalition parts ways with member party Kukiz'15										

Polling Firm/Link	Fieldwork Period	Sample Size	United Right	Civic Coalition	The Left	Polish Coalition	Confederation	Poland 2050	Others	Majority	KO+L+KP +P2050
United Surveys / DGP, RMF	27–28 Nov 2020	1,000	201	134	45	20	0	59	1	Hung	28
Estymator / DoRzeczy.pl	26–27 Nov 2020	1,019	210	135	35	0	4	75	1	Hung	15
IPSOS / OKO.press	23–25 Nov 2020	1,000	161	120	42	0	33	103	1	Hung	35
Estymator / DoRzeczy.pl	12–13 Nov 2020	1,025	210	144	35	0	12	58	1	Hung	7
Estymator / DoRzeczy.pl	29–30 Oct 2020	1,017	194	131	39	0	35	60	1	Hung	Hung
Kantar Public / "GW"	26–27 Oct 2020	1,000	153	140	33	0	33	100	1	Hung	43
Estymator / DoRzeczy.pl	25–26 Sep 2020	1,014	233	139	28	20	39		1	3	Hung
Estymator / DoRzeczy.pl	25–26 Sep 2020	1,014	238	123	14	11	30	43	1	8	Hung
Estymator / DoRzeczy.pl	22–23 Sep 2020	1,021	220	132	20	0	36	51	1	Hung	Hung
IBRiS / "Rz"	19 Sep 2020	1,100	229	130	22	0	36	43	0	Hung	Hung
United Surveys / RMF	18–19 Sep 2020	1,000	242	132	15	12	20	38	1	12	Hung
United Surveys / RMF	18–19 Sep 2020	1,000	237	122	22	0	32	46	1	7	Hung
Estymator / DoRzeczy.pl	13–14 Aug 2020	1,022	237	139	33	21	29		1	7	Hung
Estymator / DoRzeczy.pl	13–14 Aug 2020	1,022	234	127	23	8	14	53	1	4	Hung
Estymator / DoRzeczy.pl	23–24 Jul 2020	1,034	238	144	32	15	30		1	8	Hung
Estymator / DoRzeczy.pl	23–24 Jul 2020	1,034	231	119	28	11	25	45	1	1	Hung
IBSP	25–26 Jun 2020	1,092	231	145	29	14	40		1	1	Hung
Estymator / DoRzeczy.pl	18–19 Jun 2020	1,017	231	137	35	40	16		1	1	Hung
Estymator / DoRzeczy.pl	3–4 Jun 2020	1,022	226	133	36	48	16		1	Hung	Hung
Estymator / DoRzeczy.pl	21–22 May 2020	1,100	226	123	45	55	10		1	Hung	Hung
Kantar Public	18–19 May 2020	954	219	129	41	22	49		1	Hung	Hung
Estymator / DoRzeczy.pl	14–15 May 2020	1,025	240	77	48	61	33		1	10	Hung
Estymator / DoRzeczy.pl	14–15 May 2020	1,025	242	57	35	55	33	37	1	12	Hung
Estymator / DoRzeczy.pl	23–24 Apr 2020	1,018	222	91	57	74	15		1	Hung	Hung
Estymator / DoRzeczy.pl	8–9 Apr 2020	1,023	244	93	68	51	3		1	14	Hung
Estymator / DoRzeczy.pl	25–26 Mar 2020	1,032	240	101	63	52	3		1	10	Hung
Estymator / DoRzeczy.pl	12–13 Mar 2020	1,028	229	118	63	40	9		1	Hung	Hung
Estymator / DoRzeczy.pl	27–28 Feb 2020	1,031	226	136	54	33	10		1	Hung	Hung
IBSP / wp.pl	18–20 Feb 2020	1,000	203	147	52	24	33		1	Hung	Hung
Estymator / DoRzeczy.pl	12–13 Feb 2020	1,009	220	142	55	33	9		1	Hung	Hung
IBSP (Note: Projection based on polls aggregation: 38.1% – PiS, 31.6% – KO, 14.6% – The Left, 7.5% – PSL-KP, 7.6% – Konfederacja, 0.7% – others.)	3 Feb 2020		204	151	61	22	21		1	Hung	4
Kantar Public / TVN	29–30 Jan 2020	1,000	193	163	59	22	22		1	Hung	14
Estymator / DoRzeczy.pl	23–24 Jan 2020	1,027	237	140	44	30	8		1	7	Hung
Estymator / DoRzeczy.pl	9–10 Jan 2020	1,018	244	137	37	29	12		1	14	Hung
Estymator / DoRzeczy.pl	19–20 Dec 2019	1,021	237	135	45	31	11		1	7	Hung
Kantar Public / PO	29–30 Nov 2019	~1,000	179	139	62	30	49		1	Hung	1
Kantar Public / "WO"	5–12 Nov 2019	1,502	202	137	66	20	35		0	Hung	Hung
IPSOS / OKO.press	21–23 Oct 2019	1,004	218	116	67	38	20		1	Hung	Hung
Parliamentary election	13 Oct 2019		235	134	49	30	11		1	5	Hung

== Alternative seat projections ==
Following set of projections is the result of continuous simulations carried out by Election Research Team of University of Lodz. The simulations use models of the spatial distribution of votes for individual parties, based on historical data.

=== 2021 ===
Polling Firm/Link	Publication date	Simulation result	United Right	Civic Coalition	The Left	Polish Coalition	Poland 2050	Confederation	German Minority	Others	Majority
Research Partner	7 Apr 2021	results	169	89	28	0	137	36	1	0	Hung
CBM Indicator / "Rz"	6 Apr 2021	results	171 (Note: Excluding United Poland and Agreement.)	89 (Note: Excluding the Greens.)	39	15	104	23	1	18 (Note: United Poland – 18)	Hung
CBM Indicator / "Rz"	6 Apr 2021	results	210	86	36	13	97	17	1	0	Hung
Social Changes / wPolityce.pl	1 Apr 2021	results	205	132	68	0		54	1	0	Hung
Social Changes / wPolityce.pl	1 Apr 2021	results	156	83	53	9	114	44	1	0	Hung
Kantar / Polityka	31 Mar 2021	results	164	82	42	0	136	35	1	0	Hung
IBRiS / Onet	30 Mar 2021	results	191	90	39	13	96	30	1		Hung
Social Changes / wPolityce.pl	25 Mar 2021	results	206	140	64	0		49	1	0	Hung
Social Changes / wPolityce.pl	25 Mar 2021	results	164	87	37	0	128	43	1	0	Hung
Research Partner	24 Mar 2021	results	177	81	35	0	126	40	1	0	Hung
United Surveys / WP.pl	21 Mar 2021	results	211	98	40	21	67	22	1		Hung
Kantar / "GW", OKO.press	21 Mar 2021	results	162	85	34	0	135	43	1	0	Hung
Kantar / "GW", OKO.press	21 Mar 2021	results	145	99	45	0	133	37	1	0	Hung
Social Changes / wPolityce.pl	18 Mar 2021	results	205	139	66	0		49	1	0	Hung
Social Changes / wPolityce.pl	18 Mar 2021	results	170	85	37	0	128	39	1	0	Hung
Kantar	15 Mar 2021	results	197	145	34	0	76	7	1	0	Hung
PGB Opinium	13 Mar 2021	results	177	93	33	0	117	39	1	0	Hung
Estymator / DoRzeczy.pl	13 Mar 2021	results	208	83	49	14	91	17	1	0	Hung
CBOS	12 Mar 2021	results	235	62	25	0	105	32	1	0	5
Social Changes / wPolityce.pl	10 Mar 2021	results	203	140	67	0		49	1	0	Hung
Social Changes / wPolityce.pl	10 Mar 2021	results	174	91	53	0	102	39	1	0	Hung
Opinia24 / RMF	10 Mar 2021	results	167	95	35	0	128	34	1	0	Hung
IBRiS / "Rz"	8 Mar 2021	results	205	96	29	19	95	15	1		Hung
United Surveys / WP.pl	7 Mar 2021	results	206	92	42	17	96	6	1		Hung
United Surveys / WP.pl	7 Mar 2021	results	221 (Note: Excludes Agreement)	77	40	61	60	0	1		Hung
Social Changes / wPolityce.pl	4 Mar 2021	results	188	162	61	0		48	1	0	Hung
Social Changes / wPolityce.pl	4 Mar 2021	results	157	110	46	0	107	39	1	0	Hung
Pollster / SE.pl	4 Mar 2021	results	224	93	36	0	86	20	1		Hung
Pollster / SE.pl	4 Mar 2021	results	216	97	35	0	89	22	1	0 (Note: Agreement – 0, United Poland – 0)	Hung
IBRiS / Onet	2 Mar 2021	results	203	94	46	18	93	5	1		Hung
IBSP	1 Mar 2021	results	149	89	34	0	168	19	1	0	Hung
Estymator / DoRzeczy.pl	27 Feb 2021	results	210	91	48	13	83	14	1	0	Hung
Social Changes / wPolityce.pl	24 Feb 2021	results	201	147	64	0		47	1	0	Hung
Social Changes / wPolityce.pl	24 Feb 2021	results	168	89	52	0	119	31	1	0	Hung
Estymator / DoRzeczy.pl	23 Feb 2021	results	196	81	63	53 (Note: Coalition of Polish People's Party, Agreement, Kukiz'15 and conservative wing of Civic Platform)	61	5	1		Hung
United Surveys / WP.pl	22 Feb 2021	results	199	101	55	18	75	11	1		Hung
Stan Polityki	19 Feb 2021	results	158	91	35	0	137	38	1	0	Hung
Social Changes / wPolityce.pl	17 Feb 2021	results	204	133	80	0		42	1	0	Hung
Social Changes / wPolityce.pl	17 Feb 2021	results	166	78	52	0	122	41	1	0	Hung
PGB Opinium	17 Feb 2021	results	185	96	28	0	113	37	1	0	Hung
PGB Opinium	17 Feb 2021	results	160	262 (United Opposition)				37 (Note: Coalition of Confederation and Kukiz'15)	1		32
Kantar	16 Feb 2021	results	212	108	29	0	89	21	1	0	Hung
Estymator / DoRzeczy.pl	14 Feb 2021	results	206	105	37	13	77	21	1	0	Hung
IPSOS / OKO.press	14 Feb 2021	results	137	285 (United Opposition)				37	1		55
IPSOS / OKO.press	13 Feb 2021	results	169	99	40	0	106	45	1		Hung
Social Changes / wPolityce.pl	12 Feb 2021	results	193	145	54	0		47	1	20 (Note: Kukiz'15 – 20)	Hung
Social Changes / wPolityce.pl	12 Feb 2021	results	167	93	38	0	118	39	1	4 (Note: Kukiz'15 – 4)	Hung
CBOS	12 Feb 2021	results	236	76	0	0	128	19	1	0	6
Kantar	9 Feb 2021	results	202	143	25	0	82	7	1	0	Hung
United Surveys / WP.pl	8 Feb 2021	results	200	106	31	18	77	27	1		Hung
IBRiS / "Rz"	8 Feb 2021	results	203	101	35	13	94	13	1		Hung
Stan Polityki	5 Feb 2021	results	162	88	33	0	138	38	1	0	Hung
Pollster / SE.pl	4 Feb 2021	results	234	116	36	0	68	5	1		4
Social Changes / wPolityce.pl	3 Feb 2021	results	214	136	65	0		44	1	0	Hung
Social Changes / wPolityce.pl	3 Feb 2021	results	169	81	33	0	139	37	1	0	Hung
IBRiS / Onet.pl	2 Feb 2021	results	189	97	36	16	90	31	1		Hung
IBSP	1 Feb 2021	results	146	96	25	0	147	45	1	0	Hung
Estymator / DoRzeczy.pl	30 Jan 2021	results	218	103	47	11	66	14	1	0	Hung
Social Changes / wPolityce.pl	28 Jan 2021	results	190	148	61	13		47	1	0	Hung
Social Changes / wPolityce.pl	28 Jan 2021	results	163	104	34	0	126	32	1	0	Hung
United Surveys / WP.pl	26 Jan 2021	results	207	116	46	0	90	0	1		Hung
IBRiS / WP.pl	25 Jan 2021	results	184	98	40	13	95	29	1		Hung
IBRiS / Fakt.pl	22 Jan 2021	results	209	110	30	14	72	24	1	0 (Note: Agreement – 0, United Poland – 0)	Hung
IBRiS / Fakt.pl	22 Jan 2021	results	215	108	29	14	71	22	1		Hung
PGB Opinium	22 Jan 2021	results	209	110	34	14	72	20	1	0	Hung
Social Changes / wPolityce.pl	20 Jan 2021	results	197	159	54	0		49	1	0	Hung
Social Changes / wPolityce.pl	20 Jan 2021	results	165	105	39	0	109	41	1	0	Hung
Estymator / DoRzeczy.pl	16 Jan 2021	results	222	111	40	19	59	8	1	0	Hung
CBOS	15 Jan 2021	results	243	80	14	0	111	11	1	0	13
Social Changes / wPolityce.pl	14 Jan 2021	results	208	148	56	0		47	1	0	Hung
Social Changes / wPolityce.pl	14 Jan 2021	results	177	114	33	0	107	28	1	0	Hung
IBRiS / "Rz"	11 Jan 2021	results	213	115	31	15	64	21	1		Hung
IBRiS / "Rz"	11 Jan 2021	results	191	165		71		32	1		Hung
Social Changes / wPolityce.pl	6 Jan 2021	results	199	163	55	0		42	1	0	Hung
Social Changes / wPolityce.pl	6 Jan 2021	results	179	123	39	0	94	24	1	0	Hung

== Government approval ratings ==
=== President Andrzej Duda ===
Graphical summary of approval polls

Date(s) conducted	Polling firm/Link	Sample size	Approve	Disapprove	Don't know/Neutral	Net approval
3–13 Jul 2025	CBOS	970	49	44	7	5
5–15 Jun 2025	CBOS	971	48	45	8	3
6–7 Jun 2025	IBRiS / Rz	1,069	49.5	45.4	5.1	4.1
28–29 May 2025	Pollster / "SE.pl"	1,039	44	50	6	-6
5–14 May 2025	CBOS	1,080	46	46	9	Tie
5–8 May 2025	AtlasIntel	5,071	37.1	56.1	6.8	-19
3–13 Apr 2025	CBOS	1,030	39	50	10	–11
6–16 Mar 2025	CBOS	1,047	42	47	9	–5
6–16 Feb 2025	CBOS	972	38	51	10	–13
9–19 Jan 2025	CBOS	972	41	48	11	–7
10–12 Jan 2025	United Surveys / WP.pl	1,000	45.0	48.4	6.6	–3.4
28 Nov–8 Dec 2024	CBOS	915	48	45	7	3
8–21 Nov 2024	CBOS	981	43	46	12	–3
3–13 Oct 2024	CBOS	1,025	43	46	11	–3
12–22 Sep 2024	CBOS	941	44	47	9	–3
14–25 Aug 2024	CBOS	939	43	48	9	–5
4–14 Jul 2024	CBOS	1,076	47	47	6	Tie
10–20 Jun 2024	CBOS	1,055	42	49	9	–7
20 May–2 Jun 2024	CBOS	1,038	42	49	9	–7
8–18 Apr 2024	CBOS	1,079	44	49	7	–5
7–17 Mar 2024	CBOS	1,089	50	39	11	11
8–18 Feb 2024	CBOS	994	40	52		–12
11–21 Jan 2024	CBOS	1,015	43	49	8	–6
28 Nov–12 Dec 2023	CBOS	961	51	43	7	8
3–16 Nov 2023	CBOS	1,072	47	45	7	2
2–11 Oct 2023	CBOS	1,110	50	43	7	7
4–14 Sep 2023	CBOS	1,073	50	42	8	8
14–27 Aug 2023	CBOS	1,024	50	41	9	9
3–16 Jul 2023	CBOS	1,004	43	47	9	–9
7–8 Jul 2023	IBRiS	1,100	39.7	59.6		-19.9
5–18 Jun 2023	CBOS	1,054	44	48	8	–9
9–11 Jun 2023	United Surveys / WP.pl	1,000	34.1	62.3	3.6	–28.2
8–18 May 2023	CBOS	1,056	50	41	9	9
11–20 Apr 2023	CBOS	1,081	49	40	11	9
14–19 Apr 2023	Kantar Public	1,015	35	56	9	–21
17–22 Mar 2023	Kantar Public	981	30	61	9	–31
6–16 Mar 2023	CBOS	993	55	37	8	18
6–19 Feb 2023	CBOS	982	51	39	10	12
9–22 Jan 2023	CBOS	1,028	51	40	9	11
28 Nov–11 Dec 2022	CBOS	1,018	46	46	8	Tie
2–7 Dec 2022	Kantar Public	970	30	62	8	–32
7–17 Nov 2022	CBOS	1,038	50	40	10	10
4–9 Nov 2022	Kantar Public	975	30	60	10	–30
3–13 Oct 2022	CBOS	1,041	46	45	9	1
5–15 Sep 2022	CBOS	1,119	46	44	10	2
14–25 Aug 2022	CBOS	1,043	46	47	7	–1
27 Jun–7 Jul 2022	CBOS	1,084	52	37	11	15
30 May–9 Jun 2022	CBOS	1,050	52	38	10	14
3–8 Jun 2022	Kantar Public	1,012	32	57	11	–15
24–25 May 2022	Pollster	1,062	34	38	28 (Note: Neither – 25)	–4
2–12 May 2022	CBOS	1,087	55	35	10	20
8–13 Apr 2022	Kantar Public	1,008	37	54	9	–27
28 Mar–7 Apr 2022	CBOS	1,030	54	37	9	17
28 Feb–10 Mar 2022	CBOS	1,078	54	38	8	16
11–16 Feb 2022	Kantar Public	1,015	36	57	7	–21
31 Jan–10 Feb 2022	CBOS	1,065	45	43	12	2
21–26 Jan 2022	Kantar Public	1,012	29	62	9	–33
3–13 Jan 2022	CBOS	1,135	42	46	12	–4
29 Nov–12 Dec 2021	CBOS	1,063	42	47	11	–5
26–27 Nov 2021	IBRiS / Onet	1,100	40.9	56.1	3.0	–15.2
18–19 Nov 2021	United Surveys / WP.pl	1,000	43.1	52.3	4.6	–9.2
4–14 Nov 2021	CBOS	1,100	42	46	12	–4
4–14 Oct 2021	CBOS	1,161	46	43	11	3
8–12 Oct 2021	Kantar Public	1,002	30	59	11	–29
26 Sep 2021	Pollster / SE.pl		34	58	8	–24
24–25 Sep 2021	IBRiS / "RZ"	1,100	45.0	47.7	7.3	–2.7
6–16 Sep 2021	CBOS	1,218	47	44	9	4
3–8 Sep 2021	Kantar Public	1,008	35	57	8	–22
16–26 Aug 2021	CBOS	1,167	44	46	10	–2
9–14 Jul 2021	Kantar Public	1,004	31	61	8	–30
7–17 Jun 2021	CBOS	1,218	46	43	11	3
11–15 Jun 2021	Kantar Public	1,011	34	56	10	–22
6–16 May 2021	CBOS	1,163	45	44	11	1
7–12 May 2021	Kantar Public	1,005	36	55	9	–19
8–18 Apr 2021	CBOS	1,131	44	46	10	–2
9–14 Apr 2021	Kantar Public	1,006	31	62	7	–31
1–11 Mar 2021	CBOS	1,154	42	49	9	–7
5–10 Mar 2021	Kantar Public	1,014	31	60	9	–29
5 Mar 2021	United Surveys	1,000	29.9	60.6	9.5	–30.7
1–11 Feb 2021	CBOS	1,179	43	48	9	–5
29 Jan–3 Feb 2021	Kantar Public	1,011	32	59	9	–27
4–14 Jan 2021	CBOS	1,150	43	47	10	–4
30 Nov–10 Dec 2020	CBOS	1,010	44	45	11	–1
4–9 Dec 2020	Kantar Public	1,015	32	58	10	–26
5–15 Nov 2020	CBOS	1,052	41	52	7	–11
6–12 Nov 2020	Kantar Public	1,010	32	59	9	–27
19–29 Oct 2020	CBOS	1,040	42	49	9	–7
28 Sep–8 Oct 2020	CBOS	1,133	55	37	8	18
2–7 Oct 2020	Kantar Public	1,012	38	52	10	–14
18–27 Aug 2020	CBOS	1,149	56	38	6	18
30 Jun–9 Jul 2020	CBOS	1,339	53	40	7	13
5–10 Jun 2020	Kantar Public	1,012	40	50	10	-10
22 May–4 Jun 2020	CBOS	1,308	55	39	6	16
18–19 May 2020	Kantar Public	1,000	44	53	3	-9
16–17 Apr 2020	Kantar Public	1,000	44	52	4	-8
5–15 Mar 2020	CBOS	919	58	37	5	21
6–11 Mar 2020	Kantar Public	1,007	45	44	11	1
6–16 Feb 2020	CBOS	994	57	36	7	21
7–12 Feb 2020	CBOS	1,006	45	42	13	3
9–16 Jan 2020	CBOS	1,069	60	31	9	29
10–15 Jan 2020	Kantar Public	1,015	47	42	11	5
6–11 Dec 2019	Kantar Public	1,002	50	40	10	10
28 Nov–5 Dec 2019	CBOS	971	63	29	8	34
15–20 Nov 2019	Kantar Public	1,006	49	38	13	11
7–17 Nov 2019	CBOS	996	65	29	6	36
18–23 Oct 2019	Kantar Public	1,008	49	38	13	11
3–10 Oct 2019	CBOS	1,013	62	29	9	33
12–19 Sep 2019	CBOS	990	62	28	10	34
6–11 Sep 2019	Kantar Public	1,004	48	40	12	8
22–29 Aug 2019	CBOS	1,029	61	30	9	31
12–17 Aug 2019	Kantar Public	1,011	48	40	12	8
2–6 Aug 2019	Ariadna / WP.pl	1,056	38	41	21	–3
12–17 Jul 2019	Kantar Public	1,010	48	37	15	11
4–11 Jul 2019	CBOS	1,120	58	31	11	27
14–19 Jun 2019	Kantar Public	1,005	47	42	11	5
6–13 Jun 2019	CBOS	1,115	60	29	11	31
16–23 May 2019	CBOS	1,138	60	29	11	31
10–15 May 2019	Kantar Public	1,005	48	41	11	7
4–11 Apr 2019	CBOS	1,125	60	30	10	30
5–10 Apr 2019	Kantar Public	1,014	46	43	11	3
7–14 Mar 2019	CBOS	1,019	61	30	9	31
8–13 Mar 2019	Kantar Public	1,015	49	39	12	10
7–14 Feb 2019	CBOS	1,019	56	34	10	22
8–13 Feb 2019	Kantar Public	1,015	44	43	13	1
10–17 Jan 2019	CBOS	986	59	34	7	25
11–16 Jan 2019	Kantar Public	1,015	44	43	13	1
30 Nov–11 Dec 2018	Kantar Public	1,058	49	39	12	10
29 Nov–9 Dec 2018	CBOS	1,016	57	32	11	25
8–15 Nov 2018	CBOS	1,051	60	30	10	30
9–15 Nov 2018	Kantar Public	1,061	52	37	11	15
12–17 Oct 2018	Kantar Public	1,067	49	39	12	10
4–11 Oct 2018	CBOS	1,079	59	31	10	28
6–13 Sep 2018	CBOS	1,064	58	30	12	28
10–16 Sep 2018	Kantar Public	1,054	48	38	14	10
16–23 Aug 2018	CBOS	1,115	58	31	11	27
10–16 Aug 2018	Kantar Public	1,061	47	42	11	5
6–11 Jul 2018	Kantar Public	1,043	47	41	12	6
28 Jun–5 Jul 2018	CBOS	999	60	28	12	32
8–17 Jun 2018	Kantar Public	1,050	49	38	13	11
7–14 Jun 2018	CBOS	1,029	63	27	10	36
10–17 May 2018	CBOS	1,170	62	26	12	36
11–16 May 2018	Kantar Public	1,062	48	37	15	11
5–12 Apr 2018	CBOS	1,140	63	28	9	35
6–11 Apr 2018	Kantar Public	1,058	54	34	12	20
9–14 Mar 2018	Kantar Public	1,060	49	38	13	11
1–8 Mar 2018	CBOS	1,092	60	28	12	32
16–21 Feb 2018	Kantar Public	1,066	52	34	14	18
1–8 Feb 2018	CBOS	1,057	65	26	9	39
9–17 Jan 2018	CBOS	951	66	27	7	39
12–17 Jan 2018	Kantar Public	1,051	53	32	15	21
1–7 Dec 2017	CBOS	925	64	27	9	37
1–6 Dec 2017	Kantar Public	1,059	53	35	12	18
2–12 Nov 2017	CBOS	1,016	62	29	9	33
3–8 Nov 2017	Kantar Public	1,064	52	35	13	17
5–12 Oct 2017	CBOS	948	68	24	8	44
6–11 Oct 2017	Kantar Public	1,056	54	32	14	22
7–14 Sep 2017	CBOS	985	68	25	7	43
7–8 Sep 2017	IBRiS / Rz	1,100	56.6	38.3	5.1	18.3
1–6 Sep 2017	Kantar Public	1,060	56	34	10	22
17–24 Aug 2017	CBOS	1,009	65	28	7	37
4–9 Aug 2017	Kantar Public	1,063	54	36	10	18
7–12 Jul 2017	Kantar Public	1,063	51	39	10	12
29 Jun–6 Jul 2017	CBOS	977	55	35	10	20
1–8 Jun 2017	CBOS	1,020	54	34	12	20
2–7 Jun 2017	Kantar Public	1,055	48	41	11	7
19–22 May 2017	Ariadna / WP.pl	1,067	39	42	19	-3
12–17 May 2017	Kantar Public	1,047	48	41	11	7
5–14 May 2017	CBOS	1,034	53	38	9	15
30 Mar–6 Apr 2017	CBOS	1,075	56	35	9	21
2–9 Mar 2017	CBOS	1,020	51	38	11	3
3–8 Mar 2017	Kantar Public	1,059	44	45	11	-1
Mar 2017	IBRiS / Rz		39.7	56.2	3.8	–16.5
17–22 Feb 2017	Kantar Public	1,050	46	44	10	2
2–9 Feb 2017	CBOS	1,016	54	37	9	17
13–18 Jan 2017	Kantar Public	1,063	47	44	9	3
7–15 Jan 2017	CBOS	1,045	52	39	9	13
1–11 Dec 2016	CBOS	1,136	53	38	9	15
2–7 Dec 2016	Kantar Public	1,051	46	44	10	2
12–17 Nov 2016	Kantar Public	1,066	50	41	9	9
4–13 Nov 2016	CBOS	1,019	53	36	11	17
8–19 Oct 2016	CBOS	937	56	34	10	22
7–12 Oct 2016	Kantar Public	1,052	48	41	11	7
8–15 Sep 2016	CBOS	981	53	37	10	16
9–14 Sep 2016	Kantar Public	1,059	51	39	10	12
17–25 Aug 2016	CBOS	1,033	54	34	12	20
5–10 Aug 2016	Kantar Public	1,059	48	42	10	6
30 Jun–7 Jul 2016	CBOS	983	56	32	12	24
1–6 Jul 2016	Kantar Public	1,022	44	44	12	Tie
2–9 June 2016	CBOS	1,002	55	36	9	19
3–8 June 2016	Kantar Public	1,027	47	41	12	6
13–18 May 2016	Kantar Public	1,009	43	47	10	-4
5–12 May 2016	CBOS	1,100	50	39	11	11
15–19 Apr 2016	Ariadna	1,044	47	40	13	7
8–13 Apr 2016	Kantar Public	1,015	46	42	12	4
31 Mar–7 Apr 2016	CBOS	1,104	49	37	14	12
1–5 Apr 2016	Ariadna	1,020	47	41	12	6
2–9 Mar 2016	CBOS	1,034	51	37	12	14
4–9 Mar 2016	Kantar Public	1,011	48	38	14	10
3–10 Feb 2016	CBOS	1,000	47	38	15	9
5–10 Feb 2016	Kantar Public	1,002	44	41	15	3
7–14 Jan 2016	CBOS	1,063	47	38	15	9
3–10 Dec 2015	CBOS	989	43	40	17	3
4–9 Dec 2015	Kantar Public	1,003	47	36	17	11
27–28 Nov 2015	IBRiS / Onet	1,100	42	48	8	–6
6–12 Nov 2015	Kantar Public	1,027	42	32	26	10
25 Nov 2015	Ariadna	1,108	43	29	28	14
5–11 Nov 2015	CBOS	951	42	20	38	22
15–21 Oct 2015	CBOS	1,114	42	22	36	20
2–7 Oct 2015	Kantar Public	1,001	41	29	30	12
17–23 Sep 2015	CBOS	972	39	25	36	14
4–9 Sep 2015	Kantar Public	1,017	36	29	35	7
17–24 Aug 2015	CBOS	1,040	33	15	52	18

=== Prime Minister Mateusz Morawiecki ===
Date(s) conducted	Polling firm/Link	Sample size	Approve	Disapprove	Don't know	Net approval
2–11 Oct 2023	CBOS	1,110	36	53	11	–17
14–27 Aug 2023	CBOS	1,024	39	48	13	–9
3–16 Jul 2023	CBOS	1,004	33	57	10	–24
8–18 May 2023	CBOS	1,056	32	56	13	–24
11–20 Apr 2023	CBOS	1,081	34	52	14	–18
14–19 Apr 2023	Kantar Public	1,015	30	62	8	–32
17–22 Mar 2023	Kantar Public	981	27	64	9	–37
9–22 Jan 2023	CBOS	1,028	33	55	13	–22
9–15 Dec 2022	Kantar	1,001	35	57	8	–22
28 Nov–11 Dec 2022	CBOS	1,018	33	54	13	–21
2–7 Dec 2022	Kantar Public	970	26	66	9	–40
7–17 Nov 2022	CBOS	1,038	37	53	10	–16
4–9 Nov 2022	Kantar Public	975	26	64	10	–38
3–13 Oct 2022	CBOS	1,041	29	54	17	–25
14–25 Aug 2022	CBOS	1,043	31	55	14	–24
27 Jun–7 Jul 2022	CBOS	1,084	37	49	14	–12
30 May–9 Jun 2022	CBOS	1,050	35	50	15	–15
3–8 Jun 2022	Kantar Public	1,012	28	62	10	–34
2–12 May 2022	CBOS	1,087	40	45	15	–5
6–7 May 2022	United Surveys / WP.pl	1,000	41.6	49.0	9.4	–7.4
8–13 Apr 2022	Kantar Public	1,008	32	58	10	–26
28 Mar–7 Apr 2022	CBOS	1,030	38	48	14	–10
28 Feb–10 Mar 2022	CBOS	1,078	36	48	16	–12
11–16 Feb 2022	Kantar Public	1,015	31	60	9	–29
21–26 Jan 2022	Kantar Public	1,012	27	63	10	–36
3–13 Jan 2022	CBOS	1,135	33	52	15	–19
10–12 Dec 2021	Kantar / TVN Archived 2021-12-14 at the Wayback Machine	1,000	34	57	9	–23
29 Nov–12 Dec 2021	CBOS	1,063	34	51	15	–17
26–27 Nov 2021	IBRiS / Onet	1,100	44.6	48.7	6.7	–4.1
4–14 Nov 2021	CBOS Archived 2021-11-23 at the Wayback Machine	1,100	34	49	17	–15
5 Nov 2021	United Surveys / WP.pl	1,000	40.0	59.2	0.8	–19.2
4–14 Oct 2021	CBOS	1,161	38	46	16	–8
8–12 Oct 2021	Kantar Public	1,002	29	61	10	–32
24–25 Sep 2021	IBRiS / "RZ"	1,100	41.6	49.3	9.1	–7.7
6–15 Sep 2021	CBOS	1,218	37	47	16	–10
3–8 Sep 2021	Kantar Public	1,008	34	56	10	–22
9–14 Jul 2021	Kantar Public	1,004	31	59	10	–28
7–17 Jun 2021	CBOS	1,218	40	43	17	–3
11–15 Jun 2021	Kantar Public	1,011	34	57	9	–23
6–16 May 2021	CBOS	1,163	39	44	17	–5
7–12 May 2021	Kantar Public	1,005	35	56	9	–21
8–9 May 2021	IBRiS / Onet	1,100	42.9	50.2	6.9	–7.3
9–14 Apr 2021	Kantar Public	1,006	30	63	7	–33
1–11 Mar 2021	CBOS	1,154	39	48	13	–9
5–10 Mar 2021	Kantar Public	1,014	30	60	10	–30
29 Jan–3 Feb 2021	Kantar Public	1,011	28	63	9	–35
4–9 Nov 2020	Kantar Public	1,015	28	62	10	–34
6–12 Nov 2020	Kantar Public	1,010	29	62	10	–33
19–29 Oct 2020	CBOS	1,040	36	49	16	–13
2–7 Oct 2020	Kantar Public	1,012	35	54	11	–19

=== Law and Justice government ===
Date(s) conducted	Polling firm/Link	Sample size	Approve	Disapprove	Neither	Don't know	Net approval	Notes
27 Nov 2023	Formation of the third cabinet of Mateusz Morawiecki							
3–16 Nov 2023	CBOS	1,072	32	44	21	3	–12	Morawiecki's government
14–27 Aug 2023	CBOS	1,024	34	37	25	4	–3	Morawiecki's government
3–16 Jul 2023	CBOS	1,004	30	47	20	3	–17	Morawiecki's government
8–18 May 2023	CBOS	1,056	30	46	21	3	–16	Morawiecki's government
11–20 Apr 2023	CBOS	1,081	30	42	24	4	–12	
14–19 Apr 2023	Kantar Public	1,015	29	61		10	–32	
17–22 Mar 2023	Kantar Public	981	26	65		9	–39	
9–22 Jan 2023	CBOS	1,028	29	44	24	3	–15	Morawiecki's government
28 Nov–11 Dec 2022	CBOS	1,018	28	46	23	3	–18	Morawiecki's government
2–7 Dec 2022	Kantar Public	970	23	69		8	–46	Morawiecki's government
7–17 Nov 2022	CBOS	1,038	33	44	20	3	–11	
4–9 Nov 2022	Kantar Public	975	24	66		10	–42	
3–13 Oct 2022	CBOS	1,041	32	56		12	–24	PiS government
3–13 Oct 2022	CBOS	1,041	26	47	23	4	–21	Morawiecki's government
14–25 Aug 2022	CBOS	1,043	33	55		11	–22	PiS government
14–25 Aug 2022	CBOS	1,043	29	46	23	3	–17	Morawiecki's government
17–18 Aug 2022	Kantar / TVN	1,003	34	61		5	–27	Morawiecki's government
27–7 Jul 2022	CBOS	1,084	39	49		12	–10	PiS government
27–7 Jul 2022	CBOS	1,084	32	39	25	4	–7	Morawiecki's government
30 May–9 Jun 2022	CBOS	1,050	33	40	23	4	–7	PiS government
30 May–9 Jun 2022	CBOS	1,050	40	49		12	–9	Morawiecki's government
3–8 Jun 2022	Kantar Public	1,012	25	64		11	–39	
2–12 May 2022	CBOS	1,087	34	36	26	4	–2	
8–13 Apr 2022	Kantar Public	1,008	31	58		11	–27	
28 Mar–7 Apr 2022	CBOS	1,030	31	38	28	3	–7	PiS government
28 Mar–7 Apr 2022	CBOS	1,030	40	46		14	–6	Morawiecki's government
28 Feb–10 Mar 2022	CBOS	1,078	33	40	24	3	–7	
11–16 Feb 2022	Kantar Public	1,015	30	61		9	–31	
21–26 Jan 2022	Kantar Public	1,012	25	66		9	–41	
3–13 Jan 2022	CBOS	1,135	30	44	22	4	–14	PiS government
3–13 Jan 2022	CBOS	1,135	34	53		13	–19	Morawiecki's government
29 Nov–12 Dec 2021	CBOS	1,063	30	43	23	3	–13	PiS government
4–14 Nov 2021	CBOS Archived 2021-11-23 at the Wayback Machine	1,100	29	41	24	6	–12	Morawiecki's government
4–14 Oct 2021	CBOS	1,161	33	38	25	5	–5	
8–12 Oct 2021	Kantar Public	1,002	28	62		10	–34	
6–15 Sep 2021	CBOS	1,218	34	38	24	4	–4	PiS government
6–15 Sep 2021	CBOS	1,218	39	49		12	–10	Morawiecki's government
3–8 Sep 2021	Kantar Public	1,008	32	57		11	–25	
9–14 Jul 2021	Kantar Public	1,004	28	62		10	–34	
7–17 Jun 2021	CBOS	1,218	34	35	27	4	–1	PiS government
7–17 Jun 2021	CBOS	1,218	42	44		14	–2	Morawiecki's government
11–15 Jun 2021	Kantar Public	1,011	32	59		9	–27	
6–16 May 2021	CBOS	1,163	34	40	21	5	–6	PiS government
6–16 May 2021	CBOS	1,163	41	46		13	–5	Morawiecki's government
7–12 May 2021	Kantar Public	1,005	32	57		11	–25	
9–14 Apr 2021	Kantar Public	1,006	28	64		8	–36	
1–11 Mar 2021	CBOS	1,154	32	44	21	3	–12	PiS government
1–11 Mar 2021	CBOS	1,154	39	51		10	–12	Morawiecki's government
5–10 Mar 2021	Kantar Public	1,014	28	62		10	–34	
29 Jan–3 Feb 2021	Kantar Public	1,011	26	65		9	–39	
4–9 Dec 2020	Kantar Public	1,015	26	64		10	–38	
6–12 Nov 2020	Kantar Public	1,010	26	65		9	–39	
19–29 Oct 2020	CBOS	1,040	33	43	20	4	–10	PiS government
19–29 Oct 2020	CBOS	1,040	35	52		12	–17	Morawiecki's government
2–7 Oct 2020	Kantar Public	1,012	34	55		11	–21	
9–16 Jan 2019	CBOS	1,069	41	29	26	4	12	Morawiecki's government
Dec 2019	CBOS		42	29	25	4	13	Morawiecki's government
15 Nov 2019	Formation of the second cabinet of Mateusz Morawiecki							
7–17 Nov 2019	CBOS	951	43	26	28	3	17	Morawiecki's government
9–17 Jan 2018	CBOS	996	42	14	33	11	28	Morawiecki's government
11 Dec 2017	Formation of the first cabinet of Mateusz Morawiecki							
1–7 Dec 2017	CBOS	925	39	30	29	2	9	Szydło's government
2–12 Nov 2017	CBOS	1,016	40	31	27	2	9	Szydło's government
Nov 2017	SW Research / Rz	800	37.9	52.8		9.3	–14.9	Two years of PiS government
5–12 Oct 2017	CBOS	948	44	27	26	2	17	Szydło's government
7–14 Sep 2017	CBOS	985	43	30	24	3	13	Szydło's government
17–24 Aug 2017	CBOS	1,009	41	34	24	2	7	Szydło's government
29 Jun – 6 Jul 2017	CBOS	977	38	31	28	3	7	Szydło's government
Jul 2017	IBRiS / Onet		38	53			–15	Szydło's government
1–8 Jun 2017	CBOS	1,020	42	30	26	3	12	Szydło's government
5–14 May 2017	CBOS	1,034	39	34	25	2	5	Szydło's government
30 Mar – 6 Apr 2017	CBOS	1,075	38	35	25	3	3	Szydło's government
2–9 Mar 2017	CBOS	1,020	36	33	28	3	3	Szydło's government
2–9 Feb 2017	CBOS	1,016	37	33	26	4	4	Szydło's government
7–15 Jan 2017	CBOS	1,045	39	32	26	3	7	Szydło's government
1–11 Dec 2016	CBOS	1,136	37	35	24	3	2	Szydło's government
4–13 Nov 2016	CBOS	1,019	37	32	28	3	4	Szydło's government
8–19 Oct 2016	CBOS	937	36	32	29	3	3	Szydło's government
10–11 Oct 2016	Pollster / "SE.pl"	1,083	25	47			–22	Szydło's government
8–15 Sep 2016	CBOS	981	34	33	28	5	1	Szydło's government
17–25 Aug 2016	CBOS	1,033	37	32	29	2	5	Szydło's government
30 Jun – 7 Jul 2016	CBOS	983	37	30	29	4	7	Szydło's government
2–9 Jun 2016	CBOS	1,002	36	32	29	3	4	Szydło's government
5–12 May 2016	CBOS	1,100	32	35	29	4	–3	Szydło's government
31 Mar – 7 Apr 2016	CBOS	1,104	38	31	28	3	7	Szydło's government
2–9 Mar 2016	CBOS	1,034	36	33	27	4	3	Szydło's government
3–10 Feb 2016	CBOS	1,000	35	32	27	6	3	Szydło's government
7–14 Jan 2016	CBOS	1,063	36	31	28	5	5	Szydło's government
3–10 Dec 2015	CBOS	989	30	34	30	6	–4	Szydło's government
4–9 Dec 2015	Kantar Public	1,003	36	49		15	–13	Szydło's government
16 Nov 2015	Formation of the cabinet of Beata Szydło							

== Other polls ==
=== Government actions regarding environmental disaster on Oder River ===
Date(s) conducted	Polling firm/Link	Sample size	Question wording	Approve	Disapprove	Don't know	Net approval
27–28 Aug 2022	United Surveys / WP.pl	1,000	How do you assess the actions of the government and its subordinate institutions regarding the ecological disaster on the Odra River?	26.7	64.9	8.4	–38.2
17–18 Aug 2022	Kantar / TVN	1,003	How do you assess the actions of the government of Prime Minister Mateusz Morawiecki in terms of controlling the ecological disaster on the Odra River?	20	68	12	–48
16–17 Aug 2022	SW Research / rp.pl	800	How do you assess the actions of the government regarding the ecological disaster on the Odra River?	24.4	60.5	15.1	–36.1

=== Government actions regarding Russian invasion of Ukraine ===
Date(s) conducted	Polling firm/Link	Sample size	Question wording	Approve	Disapprove	Neither	Don't know	Net approval
3–5 Feb 2023	United Surveys / WP.pl	1,000	How do you assess the policies and actions of the PiS government on the international arena regarding support for Ukraine and helping them achieve victory in the war with Russia?	80.4	11.1		8.5	69.3
1–2 Apr 2022	IBRiS / "Rz"	1,000	How do you assess the actions of the Polish government on the international stage in relation to the war in Ukraine?	64.9	29.6		5.5	35.3
18 Mar 2022	United Surveys / WP.pl	1,000	Are the actions the Polish government is taking regarding Russia's invasion of Ukraine appropriate and sufficient?	68.1	28.4		3.6	39.7
15–16 Mar 2022	SW Research / rp.pl	800	How do you assess the actions of the Polish government regarding the war in Ukraine (diplomatic actions, helping refugees, etc.)?	52.2	17.8	24.3	5.7	34.4

=== Government preparation and dealing with COVID-19 pandemic ===
Date(s) conducted	Polling firm/Link	Sample size	Question wording	Yes	No	Neither	Don't know	Net approval
21–22 Jan 2022	IBRiS / "Rz"	1,100	Has government prepared Poland and Poles well for the fiifth wave of the coronavirus epidemic?	26.7	66.2		7.1	–39.5
17–18 Dec 2021	IBRiS / "Rz"	1,100	Is the government in control of the coronavirus epidemic in Poland?	35.7	55.4		8.9	–19.7
11–12 Dec 2021	Kantar / TVN	1,000	Is the government in control of the coronavirus epidemic in Poland?	34	60		6	–26
27–28 Apr 2021	Kantar / TVN	1,001	Has the Polish government done everything to prevent Poles from dying in such large numbers as a result of the pandemic?	29	59		12	–30
30–31 Mar 2021	SW Research / RP.pl	800	Is the government in control of the coronavirus epidemic in Poland?	14.5	52.1	27	6.4	–37.6
Mid Oct 2020	RMF24 & DGP	N/A	Has government prepared Poland and health service for the second wave of the coronavirus epidemic?	26.4	67.9		5.7	–41.5
Mid Oct 2020	RMF24 & DGP	N/A	Is the government in control of the coronavirus epidemic in Poland?	32.5	60		7.5	–27.5
Oct 2020	SW Research / RP.pl	N/A	Has government prepared Poland and Poles well for the second wave of the coronavirus epidemic?	18	59.9		23.30	–41.9
