= United Right (Poland) =

Polish right-wing conservative political alliance

United Right Zjednoczona Prawica
- Logo of the United Right used by Polish media.
- Abbreviation: ZP
- Leader: Jarosław Kaczyński
- Founders: Jarosław Gowin; Zbigniew Ziobro
- Founded: 11 July 2014 (parliamentary circle); 11 November 2015 (electoral alliance)
- Ideology: National conservatism; Social conservatism; Social patriotism; Christian democracy; Right-wing populism
- Political position: Right-wing
- European Parliament group: European Conservatives and Reformists Group
- Members: Law and Justice; Renewal of the Republic of Poland
- Colours: Blue; Red
- Sejm: 189 / 460
- Senate: 34 / 100
- European Parliament: 20 / 53
- Regional assemblies: 234 / 552
- City Presidents: 4 / 107
- Voivodes: 0 / 16
- Voivodeship Marshals: 4 / 16
- Politics of Poland; Political parties; Elections; A: The alliance is also described as economically left-wing, "economically very left-wing", "right-wing Catholic socialist" and "conservative socialist", or as a mixture of "Christian-Democratic, national-Catholic, patriotic, conservative and socialist beliefs".

The United Right (Polish: Zjednoczona Prawica [zjɛd.nɔˈt͡ʂɔ.na praˈvi.t͡sa], ZP), initially Fair Poland, (Polish: Sprawiedliwa Polska) refers to a parliamentary circle formed by Jarosław Gowin and Zbigniew Ziobro with their respective parties, Poland Together and United Poland. After their cooperation at 2015 Polish parliamentary election with the Law and Justice party, 'United Right' became a media label for the then-ruling right-wing political alliance of Law and Justice with its aforementioned partners in Poland.

== History ==
=== Creation (2014) ===
The alliance was formed in 2014. The alliance initially took the form of a parliamentary club in the Sejm called Just Poland (alternatively translated as Fair Poland; Polish: Sprawiedliwa Polska) formed by politicians of Poland Together and United Poland. They then agreed to co-operate with the Law and Justice party (the Piast Faction were already incorporated with them) and joined Law and Justice's parliamentary club and electoral lists that same year, in time for the 2014 local elections and the 2015 parliamentary elections. United Right was transformed into an electoral alliance led by Law and Justice.

=== Ascent to power (2016–2019) ===
The alliance was in power from the 2015 elections to their defeat in the 2023 elections. It was opposed by the Civic Coalition, led by Civic Platform, since 2018.

Throughout the parliamentary term the coalition expanded its absolute majority by crossers of the floor from Polish People's Party, Civic Platform, Modern and Kukiz'15. A major factor was when in 2017, Poland Together merged with individual centre-right orientated defectors from The Republican Association, Civic Platform, Liberty, Law and Justice, Christian National Union, Polish People's Party and Kukiz'15 to form the Agreement Party centred around the leadership of Jarosław Gowin. In 2018, Free and Solidarity, a splinter group of Kukiz'15, joined the coalition. Its candidate for the 2018 Warsaw election was Patryk Jaki.

=== Internal disputes (2019–2023) ===
In the 2019 parliamentary election the alliance gained more votes, but due to appearance of the Confederation and The Left in Sejm and cooperation between the Civic Coalition, The Left, and the Polish Coalition in the Senate, it failed to increase its majority in Sejm and even lost their majority in the Senate.

In 2020 and 2021, the alliance has been affected by actions of rebellious MPs. This was in part caused by the results of 2019 parliamentary elections, whereby the Law and Justice representation was reduced to 199 MPs, whilst United Poland and Agreement increased their tallies to 18 MPs each. This led to the notion that it is enough for just some MPs in one of constituent parties (and not the whole party) to rebel and bring down the government. Inter-party rebellion occurred on several occasions, although never managing to dissolve the alliance or bring down the government.

The first such instances were during the preparations to the 2020 presidential election. The Agreement Party did not support the Law and Justice proposal on postal voting in these elections. A second crucial instance was when the near-total abortion ban was drafted, initiated by United Poland, but initially provoking some scepticism in the Law and Justice and the Agreement parties. The third major rift was during the proposed changes to animal rights' which sought to ban animal breeding for fur production and energy policies which proposed speeding up the reduction of coal production and the sudden suspension of the Ostrołęka power plant construction. Law and Justice had proposed the opposite policies in their election manifestos, but due to pressure from the leader of the party, Jarosław Kaczyński, and the European Commission, the policies were changed.

==== Major reshuffling and loss of absolute majority in Sejm ====
On 20 June 2021, the reactivation of the congress of the Republicans took place, with some Agreement members joining the Republican association and restructuring it into a party. The newly formed party subsequently joined the governing coalition as a full member. In response, the Law and Justice chairman Jarosław Kaczyński made a speech praising the new reformed party.

After Jarosław Gowin's scepticism with the "Polish Deal" proposal (an economic recovery plan for countering the COVID-19 recession in Poland) and media law changes that would have affected a major foreign owned news channel TVN24, Gowin was publicly removed from his position as deputy prime minister, resulting in a realignment of the composition of the coalition. As result, Adam Bielan's "Agreement rebels" new party joined the coalition as replacements. The remaining Kukiz '15 MP's led by Paweł Kukiz declared their support for the ruling coalition by signing a confidence and supply agreement without formally joining the government.

After this, coalition lost its majority in Sejm, which it enjoyed since 2015 parliamentary election. On 3 September 2021, five more former Agreement MPs decided to continue their support of Law and Justice government after the remainder of the party went into opposition, creating the Renew PR political party under the leadership of Marcin Ociepa. The other four MPs were Andrzej Gut-Mostowy, Wojciech Murdzek, Grzegorz Piechowiak and Anna Dąbrowska-Banaszek.

==== Further internal disputes ====
In April 2022 it was noted that SP, most notably its leader Zbigniew Ziobro, and PiS were in a major dispute regarding the dissolution of the Supreme Court Disciplinary Chamber and repealing the law concerning the matter, a focal point of an ongoing constitutional crisis.

The proposal was made by the president Andrzej Duda, noting a complete u-turn on the subject. The escalation of the dispute was further noted by accusatory statements between Ziobro and Ryszard Terlecki, leading the former to call the situation a "real pâté" (Polish idiom equivalent of a sticky wicket).

On 22 June 2022, Andrzej Sośnierz was thrown out of the Agreement Party after his parliamentary group "Polish Affairs" (Polish: Polskie Sprawy) signed an agreement with Law and Justice. Sośnierz, along with the leader of the group Agnieszka Ścigaj (who was appointed Minister without portfolio) confirmed their participation in the coalition as independent MPs, with Paweł Szramka leaving the group.

=== Loss of power (2023–2025) ===
After the 2023 parliamentary election, the United Right won a plurality of seats but fell short of a Sejm majority. The opposition, consisting of the Civic Coalition, Third Way, and The Left achieved a combined vote total of 54% and formed a coalition government. In the Senate, the opposition electoral alliance Senate Pact 2023 won a plurality of the vote and a majority of seats. Turnout was 74.4%, the highest in contested elections and the highest since the fall of the Polish People's Republic, beating the previous records set in 1989 and 2019.

On 6 November, Duda named Law and Justice's incumbent prime minister Mateusz Morawiecki as his prime ministerial nominee. This move was criticized by the opposition, as no party that would allow PiS to reach a majority agreed to join them for coalition talks. On 13 November, the newly elected Sejm held its first session. Szymon Hołownia, leader of Poland 2050, was elected Marshal of the Sejm, winning over the incumbent Elżbieta Witek of PiS. Later that day, on the first meeting of the Senate, former Marshal of the Sejm Małgorzata Kidawa-Błońska of Civic Coalition was elected Marshal of the Senate.

On 11 December, Mateusz Morawiecki's caretaker cabinet lost a vote of no confidence in the Sejm by 190 votes to 266. Later that day, the Sejm nominated Donald Tusk for prime minister, who was subsequently confirmed by 248 votes in favour and 201 against. Tusk's cabinet was sworn in at 9:13 CET on 13 December.

Law and Justice has won 2024 local elections and then has lost the European election in the same year.

After the 2023 loss of power the Republicans party was merged into the Law and Justice. After that, talks about potential name changing and unification with Sovereign Poland has begun.

Sovereign Poland merged with Law and Justice on 12 October 2024 during PiS congress in Przysucha, despite concerns from some high-ranking members of both parties.

=== Cohabitation (2025-present) ===
In the 2025 presidential election, the party's candidate, Karol Nawrocki, scored a major upset victory against Rafał Trzaskowski of the Civic Coalition. Following a warming of relations between PiS, led by Jarosław Kaczyński, and the far-right Confederation (KWiN), led by libertarian Sławomir Mentzen and nationalist Krzysztof Bosak, during the 2025 presidential election, PiS changed course to clash with the Confederation. The turn of relations began with PiS issuing and asking the Confederation to sign onto the "Polish Declaration" (Polish: Deklaracja Polska), which included points such as "housing as a right, not a commodity" that conflicted with KWiN's economically liberal policies, as well as promises to never form a coalition with the ruling Civic Coalition.

== Ideology and factions ==
United Right is generally a right-wing coalition, with centre-right elements (like Renewal of the Republic of Poland and formerly Piast Faction and Agreement parties); it formerly also had far-right factions (focused around Sovereign Poland or politicians as Beata Szydło or Antoni Macierewicz). United Right has been described as dominated by right-wing Law and Justice, which was flanked by two minor parties that acted as factions in the coalition - "the centre-right Agreement and the far-right United Poland". Order of the Centre Agreement is the unofficial name of the most influential, although not the most numerous faction of PiS. Its leader is Jarosław Kaczyński, main members are Joachim Brudziński, Adam Lipiński and Mariusz Błaszczak. It is economically left-wing. In 2025, Afroditi Douitsi of the Aristotle University of Thessaloniki wrote that United Right consists of "parties belonging mainly to the left-wing spectrum".

After the 2019 Polish parliamentary election, the party's factions would gradually fade away in favour of complete dominance of Law and Justice. In 2021, political scientists Michał Zabdyr-Jamróz, Olga Löblová, Alexandru D. Moise, and Iwona Kowalska-Bobko described United Poland and Agreement as "essentially satellite parties of PiS with minimal own party structures (for instance, even their websites are out-of-date)." By 2022, Norwegian political scientist Henrik Øverli wrote that "it is widely known that PiS is dominating the alliance through their popularity." There was a fallout between Law and Justice and its minor partners starting from 2017, which led to some parties leaving the coalition.

After the 2019 election, the remaining parties largely disbanded due to inactivity and political irrelevance, and merged into Law and Justice. Political scientist Carolin Heilig wrote that by 2023, the United Right "was indeed united". In 2024, United Poland, considered far-right faction, merged with Law and Justice. Political commentators argued that by that time, United Poland had become completely irrelevant; Polityka described it as a "collapsed entity" that no longer played any role in the United Right. It was also noted that after the defeat in the 2023 election, Sovereign Right was also growing increasingly moderate, alinging closer to the centre-right. By the end of 2024, United Right only consisted of two parties alongside numerous independents, and came to be also described as centre-right.

In regards to ideology, United Right was variously described as "Catholic, conservative, and nationalist", "Christian-democratic, national conservative and statist", "Christian-Democratic, social-conservative, patriotic or national-conservative", as well as representing an eclectic ideology based on "Christian-Democratic, national-Catholic, patriotic, conservative and socialist beliefs". It is also described as Eurosceptic, and its electorate is "the most socially conservative, static and eurosceptic among all the parties [of Poland]". It is also considered solidarist, fiscally statist, and paternalistic conservative.

United Right has been described as economically left-wing, and "economically very left wing", given their "several extremely large benefits packages", and the fact that "their claim to be right-wing is based partly on their pro-Church stance, but this has been perceived as political expedience rather than conviction". Flagship economic policies of the United Right including increasing child support (most famously their "500+" program that was then improved into "800+"), extra monthly pensions for pensioners (known as the "13th" and "14th" pensions) as well free medicine for the elderly and the children. Its other policies and proposals included cancelling pension privatization, limiting central bank independence, rolling back increases to the retirement age, liquidating short-term job contracts and fake self-employment, taxing foreign banks and foreign assets, introducing a special tax on "megascores", and converting mortgages denominated in Swiss francs into Polish złoty.

Political scientist Pascal Siemsen argued that the economic program of United Right "would redistribute and be clearly de-commodifying", and thus represent "a classical left-wing" stance on economic issues. United Right has also been described "right-wing Catholic socialist" and "conservative socialist", and political scientists Sabrina Ramet, Kristen Ringdal, and Katarzyna Dośpiał-Borysiak argue that the alliance's economic policies and proposals "amounted to leftist (or, rather, Christian socialist)" position. In 2019, Mateusz Morawiecki who served as the Prime Minister of Poland and leader of the United Right between 2018 and 2023, acknowledged that "socialist working-class thought is deeply rooted in the philosophy of Law and Justice".

Socially, United Right Trepresents the Polish Church's stance on family and sex, including the Church's opposition to abortion, euthanasia, gay rights, same-sex marriages or in-vitro fertilisation. It also stands against ‘genderism’ seen as a threat to the traditional model of family. It assigns a major role to the Catholic Church in building of Polish society, praising it for serving as "a pillar of Polishness". Catholic teaching, together with tradition and patriotism, are seen by the United Right as "mutually interlinked in the construction of the political identity of the nation". The alliance also seeks to maintain the position of the Church role in the public sphere, pledging to maintain the influence of the Catholic Church in education (by maintaining religion classes) and Polish law. It criticizes socially liberal parties for prioritizing the needs of small minorities over Polish families and general population; the former Deputy Minister of Justice of the United Right, Patryk Jaki asserted:

Poles have a choice. Either they will choose the European Coalition and money for LGBT, or the United Right. If they choose the United Right, then the resources will be directed to the traditional Polish family, to the development of its ability, to the fight against poverty and to the growth of the economic power of the Polish state. […] We will never agree that such principles would be introduced in Poland like in the West, where boys are dressed up as girls.

== Composition ==
=== Current ===
Name		Years	Ideology	Position	Leader	MPs	Senators	MEPs	Sejmiks
Law and Justice		2014–	National conservatism Right-wing populism	Right-wing	Jarosław Kaczyński	171 / 460	29 / 100	20 / 53	206 / 552
Renewal of the Republic of Poland		2021–	Conservatism; Pro-Europeanism	Centre-right	Marcin Ociepa	6 / 460	0 / 100	0 / 52	3 / 552
Independents	(MPs)	2020–	Moderate conservatism	Centre-right	Collective (Note: Rafał Ambrozik, Grzegorz Bierecki, and Michał Seweryński as senators.)	0 / 460	3 / 100	0 / 52	0 / 552
Independents	(President)	2025-	Polish nationalism Social conservatism	Right-wing	Karol Nawrocki				

=== Former ===
Name	Years	Ideology	Position	Leader (at the time)	Reasons for leaving
Sovereign Poland	2014–2024	Social conservatism Right-wing populism	Right-wing to far-right (Note: With centre-right factions after 2023.)	Zbigniew Ziobro	Merged into the Law and Justice
Piast Faction	2014-2024	Agrarianism; Christian democracy	Centre-right	Zdzisław Podkański	Party disbanded after lack of activity
Poland Together	2014–2017	Liberal conservatism	Centre-right	Jarosław Gowin	Merged into new Agreement party
Right Wing of the Republic	2015–2017	Political Catholicism; Conservatism	Right-wing	Marek Jurek	Political disagreement
Republican Party	2017–2019	Political Catholicism; Republicanism	Right-wing	Marek Wróbel	Party disbanded
Agreement	2017–2021	Liberal conservatism Economic liberalism	Centre-right	Jarosław Gowin	Political disagreement
Free and Solidary	2018–2019	Solidarism; Anti-communism	Right-wing	Kornel Morawiecki (Note: Prime minister Mateusz Morawiecki's father.)	Disagreements over electoral lists and foreign policy towards Russia. Party disbanded in 2020
The Republicans	2021–2023	National conservatism	Right-wing	Adam Bielan	Merged into the Law and Justice party
Kukiz'15	2021–2023	Conservatism; Right-wing populism	Centre-right	Paweł Kukiz	"The desire to abandon party discipline and be independent of PiS"
Polish Affairs	June 2022 – November 2022	Conservative liberalism	Right-wing	Agnieszka Ścigaj	Party disbanded after its sole elected member (Agnieszka Ścigaj) joined Law and Justice's parliamentary group

== Election results ==
The difference between Poland A and B is particularly evident in the voting patterns of the two regions. Since circa 2005, when Poland saw a realignment in its political system, residents of Poland "A" have supported the liberal conservative party Civic Platform (PO). Residents of Poland "B" (excluding Warsaw), on the other hand, tend to support the national conservative Law and Justice party (PiS).

United Right's main support (blue). United Right has seen decreased support in the 2023 Polish parliamentary election. It remains the largest single parliamentary group in the Sejm.

=== Presidential ===
Election	Candidate	First round		Second round		Result
Election	Candidate	Votes	%	Votes	%	Result
2015	Andrzej Duda	5,179,092	34.8	8,630,627	51.6	Won
2020	Supported Andrzej Duda	8,450,513	43.5	10,440,648	51.0	Won
2025	Supported Karol Nawrocki	5,790,804	29.5	10,606,877	50.9	Won

=== Sejm ===
Election	Leader	Votes	%	Seats	+/–	Government
2015	Jarosław Kaczyński	5,711,687	37.6 (#1)	235 / 460	New	PiS
2019	Jarosław Kaczyński	8,051,935	43.6 (#1)	235 / 460	0	PiS
2023	Jarosław Kaczyński	7,640,854	35.4 (#1)	194 / 460	▼41	PiS Minority (2023)
2023	Jarosław Kaczyński	7,640,854	35.4 (#1)	194 / 460	▼41	KO–PL2050–KP–NL (2023–2026)
2023	Jarosław Kaczyński	7,640,854	35.4 (#1)	194 / 460	▼41	KO–KP–NL–PL2050–C (2026–present)

=== European Parliament ===
Election	Leader	Votes	%	Seats	+/–	EP Group
2019	Jarosław Kaczyński	6,192,780	45.38 (#1)	27 / 51	New	ECR
2024	Jarosław Kaczyński	4,253,169	36.16 (#2)	20 / 53	▼7	ECR

== See also ==
- Fidesz-KDNP
- Law and Justice
- Sovereign Poland
