= Jarosław Gowin =

Polish politician (born 1961)

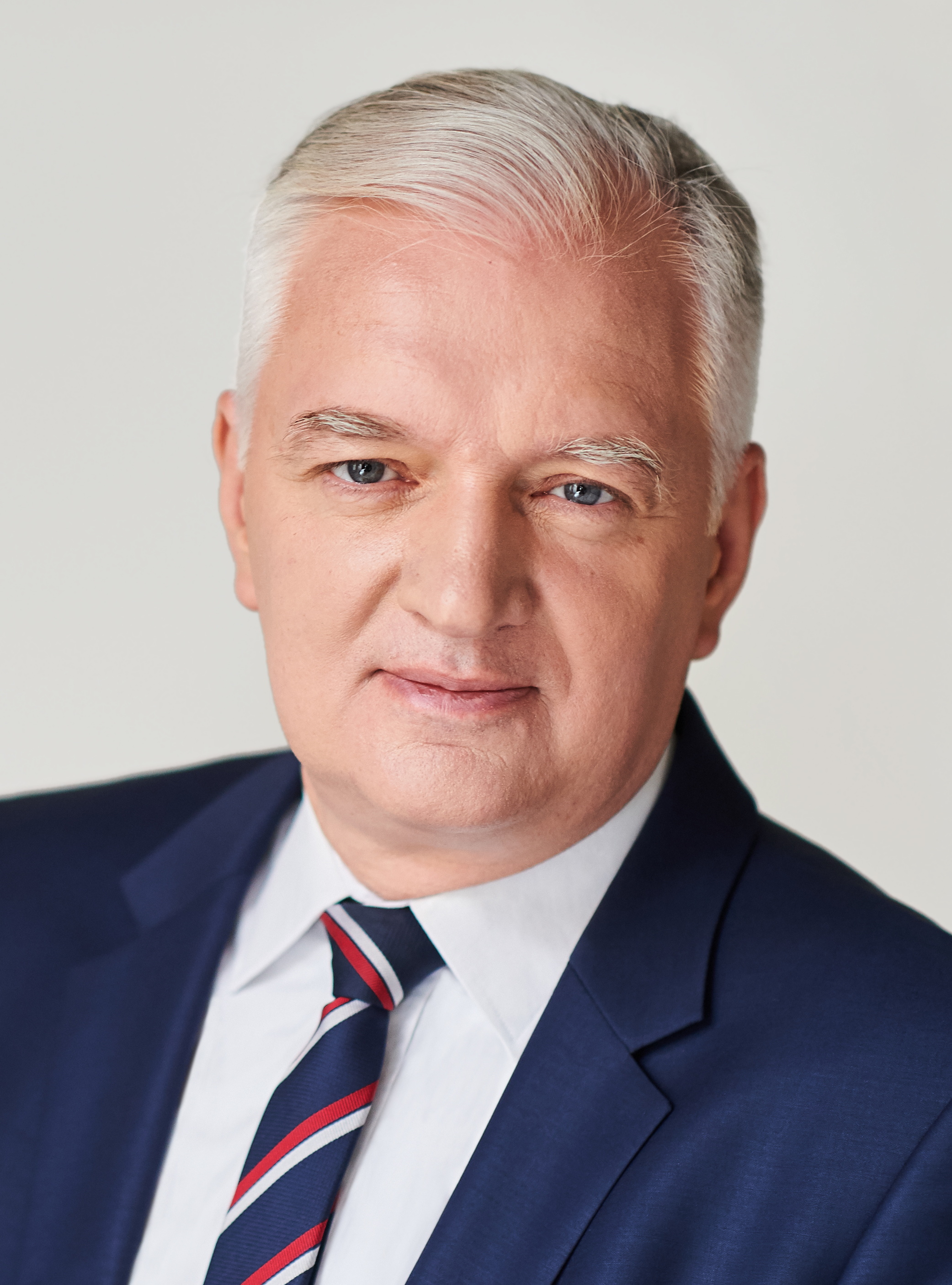
- Official portrait, 2017

Deputy Prime Minister of Poland
- In office 6 October 2020 – 11 August 2021
- President: Andrzej Duda
- Prime Minister: Mateusz Morawiecki
- Preceded by: Jadwiga Emilewicz
- In office 16 November 2015 – 9 April 2020
- President: Andrzej Duda
- Prime Minister: Beata Szydło; Mateusz Morawiecki
- Preceded by: Tomasz Siemoniak; Janusz Piechociński
- Succeeded by: Jadwiga Emilewicz

Minister of Economic Development, Labour and Technology
- In office 6 October 2020 – 10 August 2021
- President: Andrzej Duda
- Prime Minister: Mateusz Morawiecki
- Preceded by: Jadwiga Emilewicz (Development); Marlena Maląg (Labour)

Minister of Science and Higher Education
- In office 16 November 2015 – 9 April 2020
- President: Andrzej Duda
- Prime Minister: Beata Szydło; Mateusz Morawiecki
- Deputy: Wojciech Maksymowicz
- Preceded by: Lena Kolarska-Bobińska
- Succeeded by: Wojciech Murdzek

Minister of Justice
- In office 18 November 2011 – 6 May 2013
- President: Bronisław Komorowski
- Prime Minister: Donald Tusk
- Preceded by: Krzysztof Kwiatkowski
- Succeeded by: Marek Biernacki

Leader of the Agreement Party
- In office 4 November 2017 – 10 December 2022
- Deputy: Robert Anacki; Magdalena Błeńska; Jadwiga Emilewicz; Zbigniew Gryglas; Marcin Ociepa; Karol Rabenda; Arkadiusz Urban
- Secretary: Stanisław Derehajło
- Preceded by: Position established
- Succeeded by: Magdalena Sroka

Leader of Poland Together
- In office 7 December 2013 – 4 November 2017
- Deputy: Adam Bielan; Marek Zagórski; Jadwiga Emilewicz; Marcin Ociepa
- Secretary: Stanisław Derehajło
- Preceded by: Position established
- Succeeded by: Position abolished

United Right Parliamentary Club Leader
- In office 11 July 2014 – 11 November 2015
- Leader: Zbigniew Ziobro (SP); Himself (PRZP)
- Deputy: Beata Kempa (SP); Arkadiusz Mularczyk (SP); Jacek Żalek (PRZP)
- Preceded by: Position established
- Succeeded by: Position abolished

Member of the Sejm
- In office 5 November 2007 – 12 November 2023
- Constituency: 13 – Kraków

Member of the Senate
- In office 19 October 2005 – 4 November 2007
- Constituency: 12 – Kraków

Personal details
- Born: Jarosław Adam Gowin; 4 December 1961 (age 64) Kraków, Poland
- Party: Agreement (2017–present)
- Other political affiliations: Civic Platform (2005–2013); Poland Together (2013–2017)
- Spouse: Anna
- Children: 3
- Relatives: Łukasz Gibała (nephew)
- Education: Jagiellonian University
- Profession: Editor, Writer
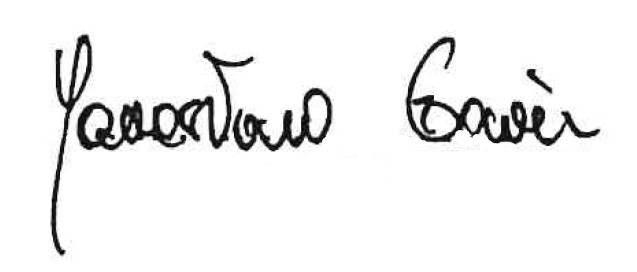
- Signature
- Website: http://www.jgowin.pl/

Jarosław Adam Gowin (born 4 December 1961) is a Polish conservative politician and editor. Gowin served as Minister of Justice in the cabinet of Prime Minister Donald Tusk between 2011 and 2013, and as Minister of Science and Higher Education in the cabinet of Mateusz Morawiecki between 2015 and 2020, Minister of Economic Development, Labour and Technology and Deputy Prime Minister from October 2020 until his dismissal in August 2021.

== Background ==
Gowin was born in Kraków to parents previously involved in the anti-communist Freedom and Independence movement, whose political discussions had an early effect on his upbringing. Later in life, Gowin was educated at Jagiellonian University and the University of Cambridge, where Gowin met and discussed Polish issues with the political scholar Zbigniew Pełczyński. Upon returning to Poland, Gowin also came into contact with professor and personal friend Józef Tischner, whose Catholic and political philosophy also highly influenced Gowin's views. Gowin later became the founder and rector of Tischner European University in Kraków. Between 1994 and 2005, Gowin acted as editor-in-chief of the conservative Catholic magazine Znak.

Gowin was elected to the Senate in the 2005 parliamentary election as a candidate for Civic Platform representing Kraków. In the wake of Jan Rokita's decision not to run for another term in the Sejm, Gowin was chosen as Civic Platform's lead candidate for Kraków in the 2007 parliamentary election, winning a seat.

Following his party's successful reelection to the government in the 2011 parliamentary election, Gowin was chosen by Prime Minister Donald Tusk to become the next Minister of Justice.

== Minister of Justice: 2011–2013 ==
Gowin was sworn in as a member of the cabinet on 18 November 2011. As minister, Gowin began a streamline program to remove bureaucratic hurdles from 49 professions in order to boost employment, including taxi drivers and tourist guides. Gowin's ministry also oversaw the criminal investigation on the collapse of investment firm Amber Gold (a company that turned out to be a financial pyramid) and its subsidiary airline OLT Express in 2012. However, Gowin was criticized over his ministry's belated discovery of the firm's financial wrongdoings, as well as a legal loophole that allowed the firm to operate without a banking license. In October 2012, as part of his ministry's plans to reform the nation's judicial system and against the wishes of the Polish People's Party, the government's junior coalition partner, Gowin issued the elimination of 79 district courts, combining their functions with other regional courts in order to better utilize staff judges.

In reaction to the opposition Democratic Left Alliance's (SLD) pledge in November 2012 to ban far-right groups such as the National Radical Camp and the All-Polish Youth, Gowin stated his opposition to any move in an interview with TOK FM. While deploring both groups' nationalist rhetoric as "repulsive," Gowin stressed that both organizations did not exceed legal limits to issue a ban, as well as citing the absence of legal tools to issue such a decree. At the same time, Gowin affirmed his belief that rhetoric from far-left groups, including opinions from the left-wing journal Krytyka Polityczna, which Gowin singled out as a publication of "Leninist apologists," were more repulsive to his generation than rightist nationalists. "When I hear demands to censor the All-Polish Youth by SLD politicians and other parties, whose roots do not have anything to do with democracy, I think that these older gentlemen would do well to give pause," Gowin was quoted.

As Minister of Justice, Gowin sought the European Court of Human Rights to recognize the 1940 Katyn massacre as a war crime and seek a proper investigation from Russian authorities over the event. During the case, Gowin stated that Russia still faced problems with the domestic rule of law in the aftermath of the Soviet Union's collapse. Similarly, Gowin was deeply critical of the same court over its decision, while reviewing the case of Abd al-Rahim al-Nashiri, to declassify papers regarding the Central Intelligence Agency's alleged detention sites in Poland from the previous decade, saying the information's release constituted a security threat to Polish citizens, and reduced chances for Poland's cooperation with the European Court of Human Rights for the near future.

While in the government, Gowin quickly earned a reputation as a political maverick within Civic Platform and the cabinet, often voicing opinions contrary to both his party's and the government's agenda. As one of the most socially conservative members of the cabinet, Gowin became the center of several inter-party disputes that distanced himself from the cabinet. In October 2012, Gowin abstained from voting on the government's opposition to a stricter abortion control law submitted to the Sejm by the United Poland. Also in October, Gowin showed surprise and dismay over Prime Minister Tusk's decision to increase in vitro fertilisation funding to married and unmarried couples trying to have children for over a year without changing existing laws, deploring the premier's lack of consulting the Ministry of Justice over the matter and instead referring the matter to the Ministry of Health. Gowin's earlier draft bill would have only given married women IVF treatment.

Prime Minister Tusk's decision to press forward in legalizing civil partnerships for heterosexual and homosexual couples in February 2013 additionally split Gowin from the prime minister and cabinet, with the justice minister leading 46 Civic Platform deputies to oppose the government's bill. Gowin's breaking ranks with the cabinet earned the justice minister scorn from many areas, with Tusk stating that "The government is a kind of civil partnership, in which loyalty is essential," while the opposition liberal Palikot's Movement (led by former PO Janusz Palikot) called for a vote of no confidence in the justice minister. Speculation increased during the period that Tusk would release Gowin from the cabinet, though the prime minister ultimately decided to retain the minister, for the time being.

=== Controversy as Justice Minister ===
Gowin's selection as Minister of Justice was controversial among left-leaning deputies within parliament. Openly gay Sejm deputy Robert Biedron from the Palikot's Movement, in an interview broadcast on Polskie Radio, controversially compared Gowin's conservative views in close alignment with the Islamist Taliban (a Sunni Islamic fundamentalist political movement and military organization in Afghanistan currently waging war), mocking his department as the "ministry of the Catholic religion." Biedron's comments were in response to Gowin's vocal opposition to legislation sponsored by the Democratic Left Alliance to legally endorse civil unions, who labeled the legislation as "not really for the welfare of specific individuals, but for a social revolution, a departure from traditional morality."

In March 2013, in the wake of former President Lech Wałęsa's comments regarding Wałęsa's view that gay politicians should sit "behind a wall" if elected, Gowin became one of the only members of the cabinet to openly agree with Wałęsa's opinions, declaring himself an opponent of "homosexual ideology." In April 2013, during an interview with TVN, when asked to clarify his opposition to greater in vitro fertilisation funding, Gowin stated that "German scientists are importing embryos from other countries—probably also from Poland—and are conducting experiments on them." The minister's comments sparked a minor diplomatic row with Germany, with the German embassy in Warsaw stressing there was no certifiable information of Polish embryos being used within German borders.

Representatives of the Polish Gynaecological Society similarly called Gowin's claims as "irresponsible and groundless." A week following the diplomatic spat, Prime Minister Tusk dismissed Gowin from the cabinet, stressing that "Gowin [had] focused too much on the political aspect of his job,” and that “I don’t have time to explain ministers’ comments every week." Tusk named former Interior Minister Marek Biernacki as Gowin's replacement for the office of Justice Minister.

== Changing alliance ==
After unsuccessful elections when he tried to replace Donald Tusk as a party leader, in September 2013 he informed that he leaves Civic Platform, then created his own political party Poland Together and started cooperation with Law and Justice party as part of United Right. Following his party's successful election to the government in the 2015 parliamentary election, Gowin was chosen by Prime Minister Beata Szydło to become the next Deputy Prime Minister of Poland and Minister of Science and Higher Education.

During his office, systemic reform of higher education and science was carried out – the so-called The Constitution for Science (Law on Higher Education and Science). The reform was preceded by a discussion with the academic community spread out in time. The Act makes many university options (including awarding academic degrees) dependent on the scientific categories that the university will obtain in its disciplines. The reform has also changed the model of education of doctoral students: in those operating since October this year. doctoral schools will provide each student with a scholarship. The Constitution for Science emphasizes that scientists publish in scientific journals located in international databases that help scientists from all over the world reach this content. After the reforms, universities also gained greater freedom in deciding on their activities. During his management, the Ministry of Science proposed and introduced two innovation laws. They increased the amount of the tax credit for research and development. The Łukasiewicz Research Network was also established – it consolidates 38 Polish research institutes.

On 13 October 2017, Gowin announced at a press conference regarding ex-Kukiz'15 and Republican MP Magdalena Błeńska's decision to join Poland Together that it would be transformed into a new party including elements of the Republicans, former members of Janusz Korwin-Mikke's Liberty party, and local politicians at its 4 November congress. According to Poland Together members, the decision was partly taken to strengthen Gowin's position within the United Right and to avoid confusion with the left-wing Razem party. Several days later, it was revealed that the ex-Civic Platform mayor of Kalisz, Grzegorz Sapiński, and the Christian Local Government Movement founded by former Łódź mayor Jerzy Kropiwnicki would also join the new party. Ex-Polish People's Party senator Józef Zając joined Poland Together on 30 October in anticipation of the new party's official launch.

== Election controversy ==
Initially, the Polish government chose to not delay the presidential election, a decision which caused controversy. In April 2020, in the wake of the COVID-19 pandemic, the Agreement's leadership strongly insisted on implementing an appropriate amendment to the Constitution of the Republic of Poland so that Andrzej Duda's term would be prolonged by two years, with no chance for re-election in return. The Agreement's MPs issued appeals for all the parliamentary parties' approval, invoking the legal requirement of a 2/3 supermajority to enact their postulate. This proposal was supported by the Minister of Health, Łukasz Szumowski, however, this was rejected by the opposition.

Despite the Law and Justice's positive recognition, Jarosław Gowin announced his resignation from his ministerial functions as a result of no political support for the postponement from any of the opposite clubs, simultaneously asserting that the coalition be maintained. On the recommendation of his party, the office of Deputy Prime Minister devolved upon Jadwiga Emilewicz, one of the Vice Chairs of the Agreement. Within following days, Wojciech Murdzek assumed the temporarily vacant position of Minister of Science and Higher Education.

On 6 May, Gowin and Jarosław Kaczyński, the leader of Law and Justice struck an agreement to move the elections. The two parties had earlier been engaged in a political struggle over whether the elections should proceed in May. On 7 May, the Sejm approved legislation for the election to be held via postal ballot. That same day, PKW announced that "The current legal regulation deprived the National Electoral Commission of the instruments necessary to perform its duties. In connection with the above, the National Electoral Commission informs voters, election committees, candidates, election administration and local government units that voting on May 10, 2020 cannot take place."

The movement of the election day was met with support and opposition from both the "anti" and "pro" Law and Justice spheres of Polish politics. An opinion poll for Rzeczpospolita, gauged public support for the Gowin-Kaczyński agreement at 43.5%, with 36.3% being against, and the rest undecided.

== Personal life ==
Gowin resides in Kraków with his wife, Anna, and has three children.

== Electoral history ==
Sejm
Election	Party	Votes	%	Constituency	Elected?
2007	Civic Platform	160,465	28.58	Kraków II	Yes
2011	Civic Platform	62,570	12.35	Kraków II	Yes
2015	Poland Together (United Right)	43,539	8.02	Kraków II	Yes
2019	Agreement (United Right)	15,802	2.43	Kraków II	Yes

Senate
Election	Party	Votes	%	Constituency	Elected?
2005	Civic Platform	157,083	25.47	Kraków	Yes

European Parliament
Election	Party	Votes	%	Constituency	Elected?
2014	Poland Together	40,699	4.45	Lesser Poland and Świętokrzyskie	No

== See also ==
- Cabinet of Poland
- Second Cabinet of Donald Tusk
