= Renewal of the Republic of Poland =

Political party in Poland

Renewal of the Republic of Poland OdNowa RP
- Abbreviation: ONRP
- Leader: Marcin Ociepa
- Founded: 3 September 2021
- Split from: Agreement
- Headquarters: ul. Wiejska 4; 00-902 Warsaw
- Ideology: Moderate conservatism; Pro-Europeanism
- Political position: Centre-right
- National affiliation: United Right
- Colours: Fuchsia
- Sejm: 4 / 460
- Senate: 0 / 100
- European Parliament: 0 / 53
- Regional assemblies: 2 / 552

Website
- od-nowa.org.pl

The Renewal of the Republic of Poland (Polish: OdNowa RP) is a conservative political association in Poland. It was formed on 3 September 2021 by former Agreement MPs that decided to continue their support of Law and Justice government after the remainder of the party went into opposition. The leader of the group is Marcin Ociepa.

== Deputies ==
Six deputies were elected on the United Right list during the 2023 parliamentary election.

- Marcin Ociepa: leader of the group.
- Grzegorz Piechowiak
- Anna Dąbrowska-Banaszek
- Krzysztof Ciecióra

On 29 July 2026, deputies Agnieszka Ścigaj and Andrzej Gut-Mostowy joined Development Plus, leaving the Law and Justice parliamentary club, and bringing the association's membership down to 4 deputies.

== Ideology ==
The group has been referred to as a pro-European "deputy ministers union" due to their apparent lack of political ideology and the fact that all but one of their MPs were deputy ministers in the Second Cabinet of Mateusz Morawiecki. The association is supposed to unveil their political program in the middle of November. Ociepa stated that "the main five priorities of the party are security, economy, self-government, European policy and health policy, with a special opening to the young generation".

== Election results ==
=== Sejm ===
Election year	Leader	# of votes	% of vote	# of overall seats won	+/–	Government
2023	Marcin Ociepa	7,640,854	35.4 (#1)	5 / 460	New	Opposition
2023	As a part of the United Right coalition, which won 194 seats in total.					
