= Good Movement =

Political party in Poland

Good Movement Dobry Ruch
- Abbreviation: DR
- Leader: Paweł Szramka
- Founded: 19 April 2023
- Split from: Polish People's Party; Kukiz'15; Polish Affairs
- Preceded by: We Can Party
- Headquarters: ul. Przeworska 3a/51 04-382 Warsaw
- Ideology: Classical liberalism; Libertarianism; Pro-Europeanism
- Political position: Centre-right
- National affiliation: Civic Coalition
- Colours: Yellow; Blue
- Sejm: 0 / 460
- Senate: 0 / 100
- European Parliament: 0 / 52
- Regional assemblies: 0 / 552

Website
- www.dobryruch.org

Good Movement (Polish: Dobry Ruch, alternatively meaning Good Move) is a Polish liberal political party with strong libertarian leanings. It was formed on the 19th of April 2023 as a rebranded version of the We Can party (Możemy). The new party is led by a former Kukiz'15 MP, Paweł Szramka, who has been named the national coordinator for the party.

== History ==
The party was founded by Paweł Szramka in April 2023 and is based on the widely unknown political movement "We Can!" (Polish: Możemy), which was registered in January 2023 and was deregistered shortly after. Leader of the party, Paweł Szramka, entered Polish Sejm in the 2015 Polish parliamentary election as a member of the right-wing populist Kukiz'15, and then was re-elected in the 2019 Polish parliamentary election after joining centre-right Polish People's Party.

Szramka broke with Paweł Kukiz in late 2020, which led him to found a Sejm political circle known as Polish Affairs (Polish: Polskie Sprawy) together with Agnieszka Ścigaj and Andrzej Sośnierz, who were later joined by Zbigniew Girzyński as well. The group planned to found their own political party, but the circle fell apart because its members decided to cooperate with Law and Justice. Szramka strongly disagreed with this decision and left the group in June 2022.

In August 2023, Szramka announced that he will be running from the list of Civic Coalition, formally bringing his party into the coalition. The decision to join the Civic Coalition was approved from all members of the party's board, and in his announcement Szramka stressed that the decision was made because they found it necessary with an already existing, well-established party bloc. This decision was a part of the Civic Coalition's efforts to unite politicians opposed to Law and Justice under its banner - the coalition also invited Michał Kołodziejczak, the leader of the agrarian socialist AGROunia, as well as Roman Giertych, the leader of the national-Catholic League of Polish Families, to its electoral lists.

However, Szramka did not manage to maintain his seat in the 2023 Polish parliamentary election, despite running on the electoral list of the Civic Coalition. Running in the Sejm Constituency no. 5, Szramka received the fifth largest number of votes within the coalition's list, but the total votes for the Civic Coalition in the constituency only amounted to the alliance winning four seats in total.

== Deputies ==
=== 2019 ===
Deputies were elected on Polish Coalition list.

- Paweł Szramka: leader of the party.

== Ideology ==
Before rebranding as Dobry Ruch, Możemy was a classical liberal and pro-European party, "bearing in mind the personal, economic and political freedom of all citizens". In their ideological declaration, the party opted for legalising cannabis, civil partnerships, introduction of voluntary medical insurance, separation of church and state, and decentralisation. Although it supports NATO and European integration, it opposes a European superstate. Economically, it has been described as neoliberal.

The party lists 'economic and personal freedom' as its flagship demand, arguing that it is necessary for Poland to deregulate its economy and limit bureaucracy to experience economic growth. The party's ten-point ideological declaration, presented by the party, refers to "abolishing regulations restricting the free conduct of business, including redundant permits, licences and concessions". The party opposes restriction of trade on Sundays, as well as additional sectoral taxes such as a trade tax, a bank tax or a 'sugar' tax", and "ultimately advocate the abolition of income taxes with a corresponding reduction in public spending. It also calls for legal recognition of civil partnerships other than marriages, abolition of public media, and defunding religious lessons and chaplaincy activities.

Other proposals of the party include abolition of PIT and CIT taxes, abolition of the Family 500+ program, replacing Polish universal healthcare system with voluntary health contribution, expansion of renewable and nuclear energy, decentralisation and direct democracy. On social issues, Good Movement advocates the legalisation of same-sex civil partnerships and marijuana, as well as the liberalisation of abortion law.

The party only ruled out cooperation with Law and Justice and declared its preference for the Civic Coalition which it later became a part of. The party is however aligned to Confederation Liberty and Independence on economic issues, and the party leader does admit that the movement is close to the party but finds Confederation too controversial, stating: "From an economic angle, I could even agree with the Confederation, but I could not go to the elections with them to later explain the irresponsible statements of MPs Braun and Korwin-Mikke."

== Election results ==
=== Sejm ===
Election year	Leader	# of votes	% of vote	# of overall seats won	+/–	Government
2023	Paweł Szramka	6,629,402	30.7 (#2)	0 / 460	New	Extra-parliamentary
2023	Paweł Szramka	As part of Civic Coalition, which won 157 seats in total.				
