= Banaszek =

Banaszek is a Polish surname.

Notable people with the surname include:

- Adrian Banaszek (born 1993), Polish cyclist
- Alan Banaszek (born 1997), Polish cyclist
- Anna Dąbrowska-Banaszek (born 1961), Polish doctor, and member of the IX Sejm
- Cas Banaszek (1945–2019), American football player
- Jakub Banaszek (born 1991), Polish politician
- Norbert Banaszek (born 1997), Polish cyclist

- Banaszak
