= Magdalena Sroka =

Polish politician and former police officer

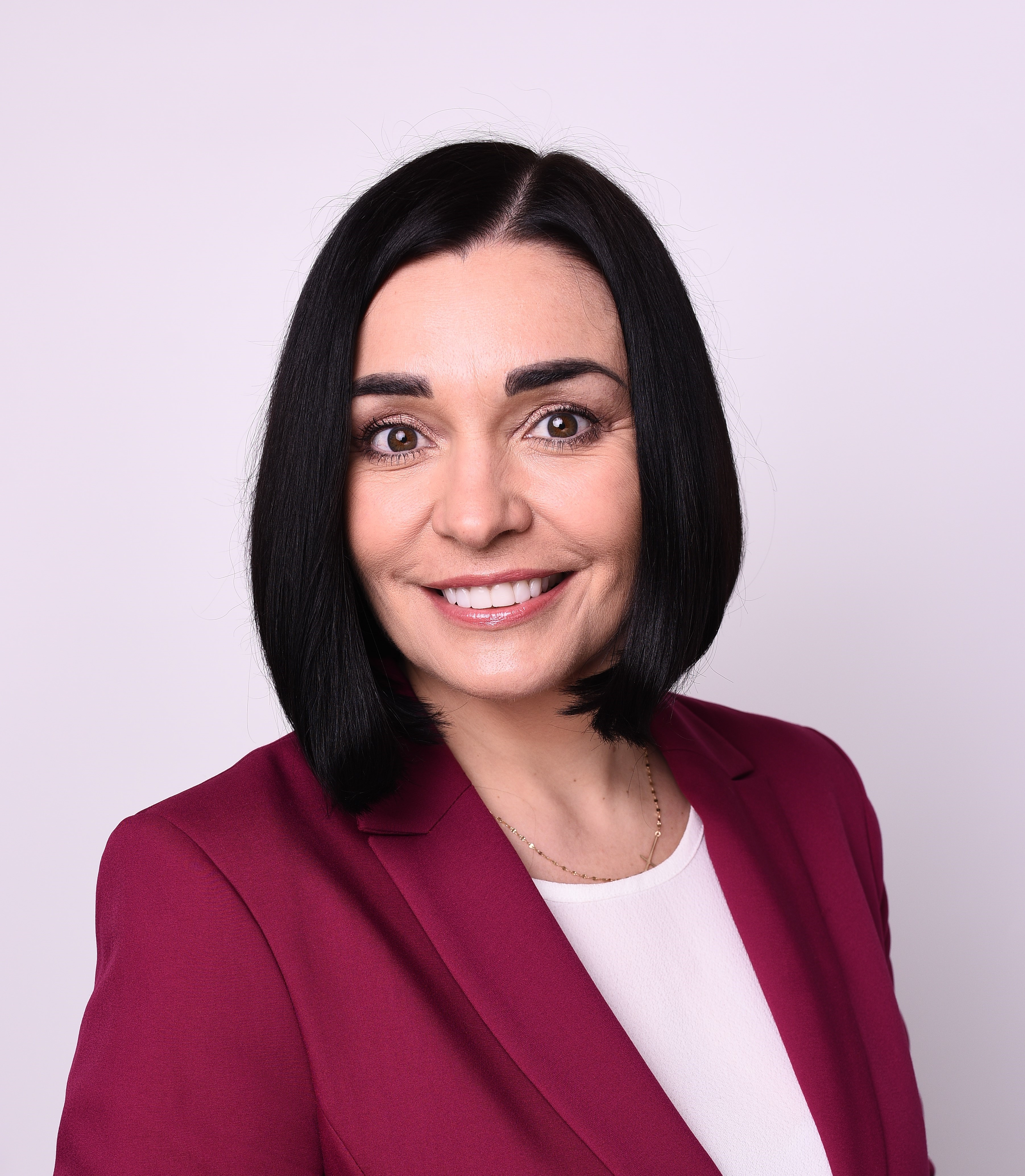
- Sroka in 2023

Leader of the Agreement
- In office 10 December 2022 – Summer 2023
- Preceded by: Jarosław Gowin
- Succeeded by: Stanisław Derehajło

Member of the Sejm
- Incumbent
- Assumed office 12 November 2019
- Constituency: 26 (Słupsk) (2019–2023); 25 (Gdańsk) (2023–present)

Member of the Pomeranian Voivodeship Sejmik
- In office 2018–2019

Personal details
- Born: Magdalena Joanna Sroka; 15 July 1979 (age 46) Gdańsk, Poland
- Political party: PSL (since 2023); Agreement (until 2023)
- Profession: Police officer; politician
- Website: Official website

Magdalena Joanna Sroka (born 15 July 1979) is a Polish politician and former police officer, serving as a member of the Sejm since 2019. She was the leader of the Agreement political party between 2022 and 2023. Since 2023, she has been a member of the Polish People’s Party.

== Biography ==
Magdalena Sroka was born in Gdańsk on 15 July 1979.

=== Education ===
Sroka obtained a master's degree in PE teaching at the Academy of Physical Education and Sport in Gdańsk in 2003. In 2006 she completed her postgraduate studies in human resources management at the University of Gdańsk. Sroka attended Police Academy in Szczytno and graduated from officer studies in 2009. She achieved the MBA degree at the Higher School of Business and Services in Poznań in 2019.

=== Police service ===
From 2003 Magdalena Sroka served in the Police with the crime unit in Sopot. Later on she moved to the Pomeranian Voivodeship Headquarters in Gdańsk where she worked as a staff member. Sroka retired in 2019 with the rank of Senior Commissioner.

=== Political career ===
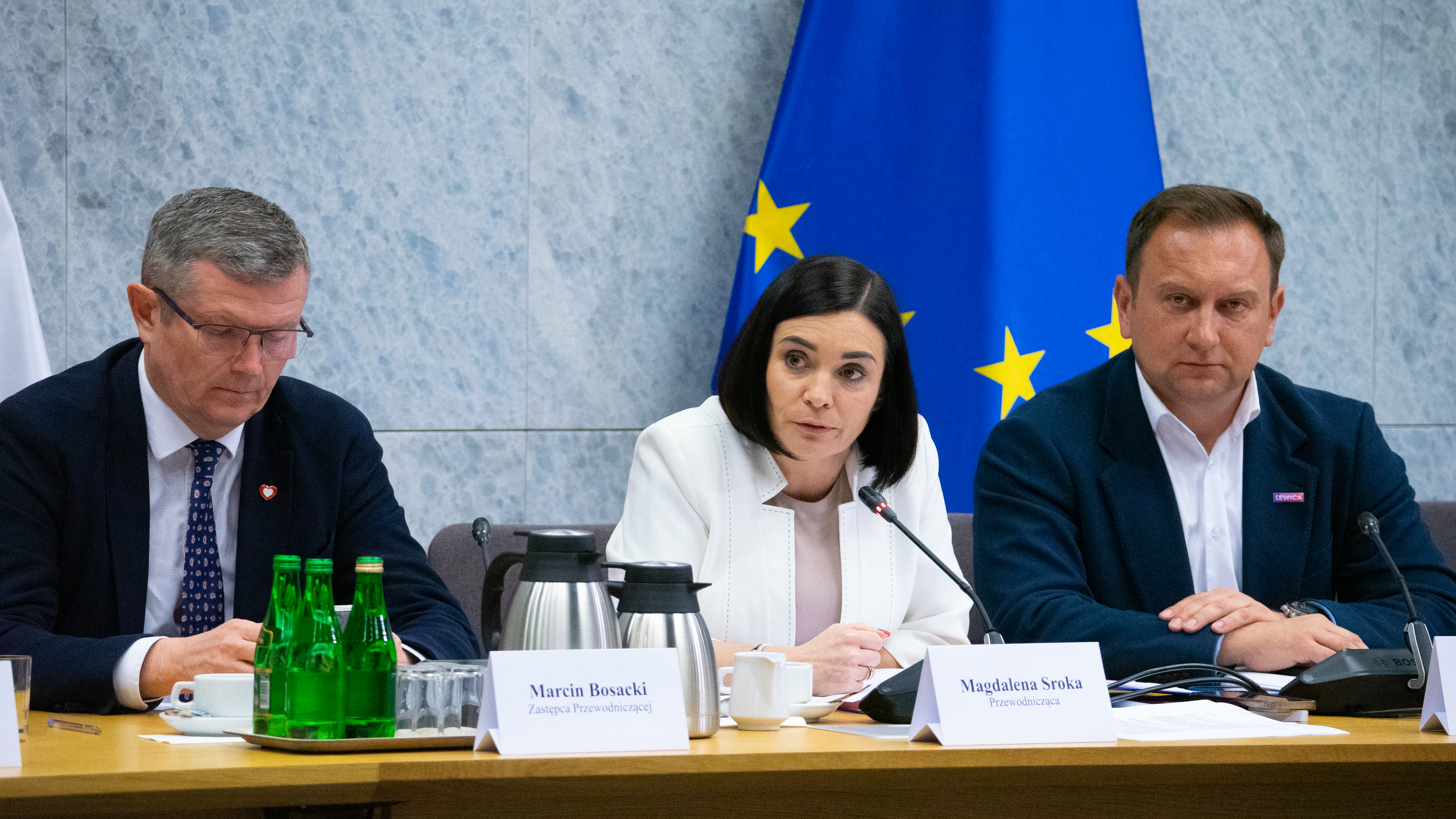
Sroka at the Pegasus spyware investigative committie, April 2024.

In 2018 Sroka was elected member of the Pomeranian Voivodeship Sejmik, as a Jarosław Gowin's Agreement activist running from the Law and Justice (PiS) party list. Next year she successfully run for the Sejm at the 2019 parliamentary election, again listed with the PiS and representing Constituency no. 26 (Słupsk). In early 2020 Sroka became a spokesperson of the Agreement party. At the party congress on 27 June 2021 she was chosen one of the four deputy leaders of the party. After Jarosław Gowin was dismissed from the cabinet on 11 August 2021, Sroka and other parliamentarians loyal to Gowin left the PiS parliamentary group and formed separate caucus of the Agreement party, departuring from the coalition government. In June 2022 Małgorzata Sroka and Marek Biernacki, member of the Polish People's Party (PSL) and representative of the Polish Coalition, signed an agreement on regional collaboration in Pomerania. They opened a shared parliamentary office in Żukowo later in September. When Jarosław Gowin resigned from party leadership on 10 December 2022, Sroka was elected as his successor with the support of 82 out of 86 delegates and being the only candidate. With the upcoming parliamentary election in the autumn of 2023, coalition negotiations were initiated between the Agreement and AGROunia, represented by its leader Michał Kołodziejczak, in early February 2023. Sroka was subsequently criticised for the initiative by some members of her party with parliamentarian Michał Wypij and caucus spokesperson leaving. Eventually coalition collapsed in May 2023. Sroka together with two other Agreement parliamentarians joined the Polish Coalition parliamentary group on 20 July 2023. Prior to the parliamentary election held in October 2023, she left the party, running for reelection as an independent politician endorsed by PSL listed with the Third Way coalition. She obtained a seat in the Constituency no. 25 (Gdańsk). Afterwards the election Sroka joined the Polish People's Party. On 26 January 2024 she was appointed by the Sejm a chairperson of the committee investigating use of the Pegasus spyware by the previous government. In June 2024 Sroka became a spokesperson of the PSL-TD parliamentary group.
