= Agreement (political party) =

Political party in Poland

Agreement Porozumienie
- Leader: Stanisław Derehajło
- Founder: Jarosław Gowin
- Founded: 4 November 2017
- Preceded by: Poland Together
- Headquarters: ul. Wilcza 23 m. 29, 00–544 Warsaw
- Youth wing: Young Right (until 2023)
- Ideology: Liberal conservatism
- Political position: Centre-right
- National affiliation: Polish Coalition (2023); United Right (2017–2021)
- Colours: Purple
- Sejm: 0 / 460
- Senate: 0 / 100
- European Parliament: 0 / 53
- Regional Councils: 1 / 552
- City Presidents: 0 / 107

Website
- pjg.org.pl

The Agreement (Polish: Porozumienie), formally known as Jarosław Gowin's Agreement (Polish: Porozumienie Jarosława Gowina), is a centre-right political party in Poland.

It was founded in November 2017, led by the former Deputy Prime Minister and Minister of Science and Higher Education Jarosław Gowin, as an expansion of Gowin's previous party, Poland Together, before changing its name. It was allied with the ruling party of Poland, Law and Justice (PiS), as part of the United Right until August 2021. Its current leader is Stanisław Derehajło.

== History ==
=== Foundation ===
On 13 October 2017, Gowin announced at a press conference regarding ex-Kukiz'15 and Republican MP Magdalena Błeńska's decision to join Poland Together (Polska Razem) that it would be transformed into a new party including elements of the Republicans, former members of Janusz Korwin-Mikke's Liberty party, and local politicians at its 4 November congress. According to Poland Together members, the decision was partly taken to strengthen Gowin's position within the United Right and to avoid confusion with the left-wing party Left Together (Lewica Razem). Several days later, it was revealed that the ex-Civic Platform mayor of Kalisz, Grzegorz Sapiński, and the Christian Local Government Movement founded by former Łódź mayor Jerzy Kropiwnicki would also join the new party. Ex-Polish People's Party senator Józef Zając joined Poland Together on 30 October in anticipation of the new party's official launch.

At the 4 November Poland Together congress, the name of the new party was revealed as Porozumienie (Agreement). Gowin announced that Błeńska, Zając, and ex-Modern MP Zbigniew Gryglas would join the Alliance, with Błeńska and Gryglas becoming deputy leaders, as well as the creation of programmatic, local government, and economic councils to advise the leadership of the new party.

On 9 January 2018, in terms of the reconstruction in the Council of Ministers's composition, Jadwiga Emilewicz, a Vice Chair of the Agreement, became the head of the Ministry of Entrepreneurship and Technology, and Anna Streżyńska, a politician sympathizing with Gowin's party, was recalled as Minister of Digital Affairs. 12 days later, the deputy Mieczysław Baszko entered the Agreement and simultaneously relinquished his membership of the Polish People's Party parliamentary club.

On 6 February, due to the legal court's objection to registering the name "Agreement", the leadership of the party suggested that "Jarosław Gowin's Agreement" be the full name of the movement, which was not legally approved until 22 June 2018.

=== Expansion ===
In March 2018, Vice chairman Marek Zagórski, a deputy who had thus far served the government as Secretary of State in the Ministry for Digital Affairs, renounced his membership of the party, shortly entering the Law and Justice due to assuming the office of Minister for Digital Affairs itself.

In April 2018, six months prior to the following local elections, in addition to Jakub Banaszek being announced to candidate for the office of city mayor in Chełm, the United Right reported two candidates of Gowin's party to run for mayoralty of voivodeship capital cities — Jacek Żalek (Białystok) and Michał Wypij (Olsztyn). Ultimately, Jakub Banaszak was the only candidate to assume the office of Mayor, even though Michał Zalewski and Andrzej Wnuk, politicians sympathizing with the party with no formal membership, obtained offices in Toruń and Zamość, respectively. In total, two other members of the party became heads of urban-rural communes, with seven other candidates being elected heads of rural communes. Simultaneously, the Agreement obtained 19 seats in 11 out of 16 Regional Assembles. Released by reason of a Law and Justice deputy winning a local election, one seat in the Sejm was given to Kamil Bortniczuk, an activist of the Agreement.

In 2019 European Parliament election, representatives of the Agreement were placed on the Law and Justice electoral list one more time, receiving one point in each constituency. Adam Bielan, a Vice Marshal of the Senate, was given the first place in a district covering an extensive territory of Masovian Voivodeship, resulting in him being the only party member to obtain a seat. Candidacies put up by Gowin's party took 2.25 per cent of the vote, and therefore 4.95% of the vote cast for the Law and Justice.

In July 2019, candidacies for the Sejm reported by the Agreement were registered in every constituency on the Law and Justice's lists, in addition to five party members running for senatorial seats in single-member districts. In total, 18 members of Gowin's party sat in the lower house, and two out of five took seats in the upper.

=== Ruling coalition ===
In November, the Agreement signed up another coalition agreement with the Law and Justice and the United Poland. Representatives of the party entered the 2nd cabinet of Mateusz Morawiecki, assuming the ministerial offices belonging to them in the previous composition. Jarosław Gowin was appointed one of three Deputy Prime Ministers and Jadwiga Emilewicz Minister of Development. Moreover, the number of party members serving as Secretaries and Undersecretaries of State in ministries notably expanded.

In the 2020 presidential election, the Agreement supported the incumbent President Andrzej Duda's candidacy, and activists of the party, inter alia Adam Bielan, entered his electoral committee. In April 2020, in the wake of the COVID-19 pandemic, the Agreement's leadership strongly insisted on implementing an appropriate amendment to the Constitution of the Republic of Poland so that Andrzej Duda's term would be prolonged by two years, with no chance for re-election in return. The Agreement's MPs issued appeals for all the parliamentary parties' approval, invoking the legal requirement of a 2/3 supermajority to enact their postulate. Despite the Law and Justice's positive recognition, Jarosław Gowin announced his resignation from his ministerial functions as a result of no political support for the postponement from any of the opposite clubs, simultaneously asserting that the coalition be maintained. On the recommendation of his party, the office of Deputy Prime Minister devolved upon Jadwiga Emilewicz, one of the Vice Chairs of the Agreement. Within following days, Wojciech Murdzek assumed the temporarily vacant position of Minister of Science and Higher Education.

=== Internal conflict ===
In 2020 and 2021, the United Right coalition was affected by actions of rebellious MPs. It by itself was caused by results of 2019 parliamentary elections, when Law and Justice was reduced to 199 MPs and United Poland and Agreement increased their tallies to 18 MPs each. This led to notion that is enough for just some MPs in one of constituent parties (and not a whole party) to rebel and bring down the government. This has happened on several occasions, although never managing to dissolve the alliance itself.

The first such instances were during the preparations to 2020 presidential election. The Agreement Party did not support the Law and Justice proposal on postal voting in these elections.

A second crucial instance was when near-total abortion ban was drafted, which originally was brought by United Poland, but the Law and Justice and the Agreement party were initially sceptical about the notion. The third major rift was during the proposed changes to animal rights' which proposed no animal breeding for fur production and energy policies which proposed speeding up the reduction of coal production and the sudden suspension of Ostrołęka power plant construction. The Law and Justice had proposed the opposite policies in their election manifestos, but due to pressure from leader of the party, Jarosław Kaczyński, and the European Commission, the policies were changed.

By the beginning of February 2021, conflict between Adam Bielan and Gowin was reported. Bielan disputed the party leadership election results, which led to Gowin's reelection. Bielan and four other members later were expelled from the party. In June 2021, the faction resurrected The Republicans.

Karol Rabenda announced that some Agreement members will join the Republican association and restructure it into a party, and that the newly formed party will subsequently join the governing coalition as a full member. In response, the Law and Justice chairman Jarosław Kaczyński made a speech praising the new reformed party.

=== Opposition and coalition exit ===
After Jarosław Gowin's scepticism with the "Polish Deal" proposal (an economic recovery plan for countering the COVID-19 recession in Poland) and media law changes that would have affected TVN24, Gowin was publicly removed from his position as deputy prime minister, resulting in realignment of the composition of the United Right coalition. As result, Adam Bielan's "Agreement rebels" new party joined the coalition as replacements. The remaining Kukiz '15 MP's led by Paweł Kukiz have declared their support for the coalition by signing an agreement without formally joining.

On 3 September 2021, five more former Agreement MPs decided to continue their support of Law and Justice government after the remainder of the party went into opposition, creating Renew PR political party under the leadership of Marcin Ociepa. The other four MPs were Andrzej Gut-Mostowy, Wojciech Murdzek, Grzegorz Piechowiak and Anna Dąbrowska-Banaszek.

On 22 June 2022, Andrzej Sośnierz was thrown out of the party after his parliamentary group "Polish Issues" (Polish: Polskie Sprawy) signed an agreement with Law and Justice. Sośnierz, along with Paweł Szramka and leader of the group Agnieszka Ścigaj confirmed their participation in the ruling coalition as independent MP's.

On 7 February 2023, the leader of the AGROunia, Michał Kołodziejczak, and the president of the Agreement party, Magdalena Sroka, announced their intention to merge AGROunia with the Agreement into a joint political party. The party's youth wing, the Young Right, opposed the decision and broke off cooperation with the party. As Young Poland Association it became part of the Polish Coalition.

On 23 May 2023, the cooperation between Agreement and AGROunia was suspended. On 20 July 2023, Agreement MPs have joined the parliamentary club of Polish Coalition (except for Jarosław Gowin, who decided not to run in the next election). Another Agreement member, Stanisław Derehajło, decided to run from Confederation list.

After the 2023 election, only Magdalena Sroka was elected as an Agreement MP from Third Way list (coalition committee of PSL-Polish Coalition and Poland 2050). Józef Zając was elected as a senator with support of Senate Pact 2023 and has joined Third Way Senate group. Shortly after nomination Sroka decided to leave the party (like many other Agreement dissidents inside the Polish Coalition) to join PSL. Since then, the party is led by Stanisław Derehajło.

In the 2024 regional election, Stanisław Derehajło was elected as a sole representative of Confederation in Podlaskie Sejmik.

== Ideology ==
The Agreement sits on the centre-right on the political spectrum. It has been described as liberal-conservative, and it supports economically liberal policies.

According to its program, it defines as a pro-European Union party, and as a "modern conservative" party, with strong emphasis on economic liberalism and reducing bureaucracy, and claims to be moderately conservative on social and cultural issues. It believes that local government should be encouraged and supported by the central government.

== Structure and members ==
The leadership of the Agreement is classified into the Central Committee, headed by the Presidium, and the Central Covenant. Voivodship subdivisions were rescinded during the reorganization in 2017 in favor of ones coinciding with Sejm constituencies.

=== Presidium of the Central Committee ===
- Chair: Stanisław Derehajło
- Vice Chair: Vacancy
- Secretary General: Vacancy
- Treasurer: Jacek Hecht
- Spokesperson: Vacancy
- President of the Central Covenant:Stanisław Derehajło
- Other members:
  - Jarosław Gowin

=== Senators ===
- Józef Zając (formally elected as an independent with support of Senate Pact 2023; independent member of the Third Way group)

== Election results ==
=== Presidential ===
| Election | Candidate | 1st round | | 2nd round | |
| Election | Candidate | # of overall votes | % of overall vote | # of overall votes | % of overall vote |
|---|---|---|---|---|---|
| 2020 | Supported Andrzej Duda | 8,450,513 | 43.50 (#1) | 10,440,648 | 51.03% (#1) |

=== Sejm ===
| Election | Leader | # of votes | % of vote | # of overall seats won | +/– | Government |
|---|---|---|---|---|---|---|
| 2019 | Jarosław Gowin | 8,051,935 | 43.6 (#1) | 16 / 460 | New | Coalition (2019-2021) |
| 2019 | Jarosław Gowin | 8,051,935 | 43.6 (#1) | 16 / 460 | New | Opposition (2021-2023) |
| 2019 | As a part of United Right, which won 235 seats in total. | | | | | |
| 2023 | Magdalena Sroka | 3,110,670 | 14.4 (#3) | 0 / 460 | ▼16 | Extra-parliamentary |
| 2023 | As a part of Third Way, which was a part of Senate Pact 2023, which won 65 seats in total. | | | | | |

=== Senate ===
| Election | # of overall seats won | +/– |
|---|---|---|
| 2019 | 2 / 100 | ▲2 |
