= Kamil Bortniczuk =

Polish politician

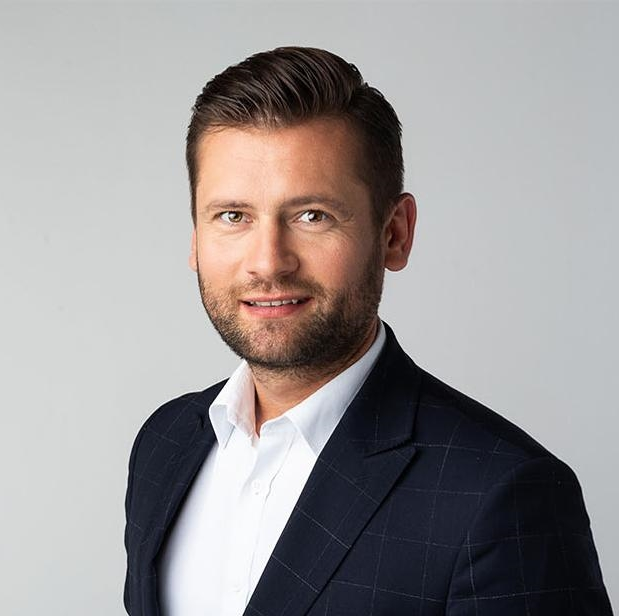

Minister of Sport and Tourism
- In office 26 October 2021 – 27 November 2023
- President: Andrzej Duda
- Prime Minister: Mateusz Morawiecki
- Preceded by: Witold Bańka
- Succeeded by: Danuta Dmowska

Member of Sejm
- Incumbent
- Assumed office 22 November 2018

Personal details
- Born: 11 June 1983 (age 43) Głuchołazy, Polish People's Republic
- Party: Poland Comes First (2010‍–‍2013); Poland Together (2013‍–‍2017); Agreement (2017‍–‍2021); The Republicans (2021‍–‍2023); Law and Justice (2002‍–‍2010, 2023‍–‍present)
- Spouse: Anna Bortniczuk
- Children: 4
- Education: University of Gdańsk
- Profession: politician, lawyer
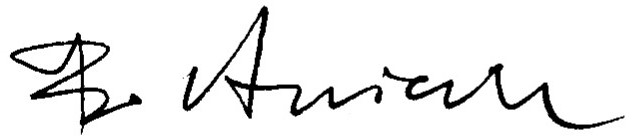
- Signature

Kamil Bortniczuk (born 11 June 1983) is a Polish politician, member of the VIII and IX Sejm as a member of the Agreement political party, within the Law and Justice parliamentary club as part of the United Right coalition. He represents the Opole constituency. In October 2021 he became the Polish Minister of Sport and Tourism.

== Polish Minister of Sport and Tourism ==
On 26 October 2021 he became the Polish Minister of Sport and Tourism.

In April 2022, after the 2022 Russian invasion of Ukraine, he said that Poland wanted Russia to be excluded from every sports federation led by the International Olympic Committee until peace has been restored in Ukraine, and Ukraine has received compensation for the invasion.

== Personal and early years ==
In 2007 he finished studies in international relations in the University of Wrocław, and in 2017 in law in the University of Gdańsk.

He and his wife Anna have three daughters and a son.
