= Marek Migalski =

Polish politician (born 1969)

Marek Henryk Migalski MEP
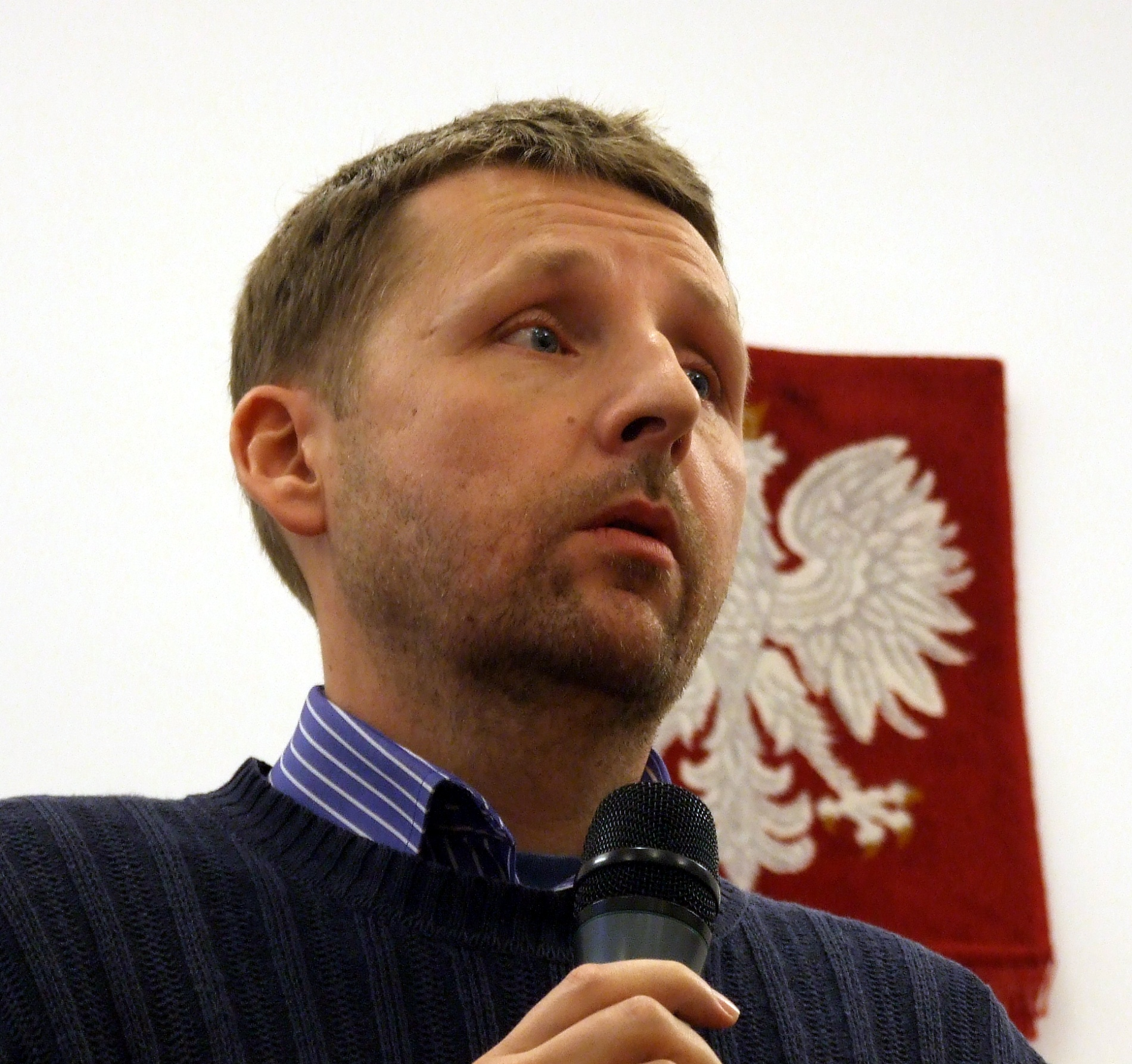

Member of the European Parliament
- In office 7 June 2009 – 30 June 2014
- Constituency: 11 –Silesian

Personal details
- Born: 14 January 1969 (age 57) Racibórz, Poland
- Party: Poland Together
- Profession: Political scientist
- Website: www.migalski.eu/

Marek Henryk Migalski (born 14 January 1969) is a Polish politician, Member of the European Parliament, political scientist, and columnist. A member of Poland Comes First (PjN), Migalski was elected to the European Parliament at the 2009 election for Law and Justice (PiS). He never joined the party, and his open criticism of PiS leader Jarosław Kaczyński led to his expulsion from the party's group and the creation of the more moderate PjN in late 2010.

He was born in Racibórz.

== Professional career ==
Migalski taught Polish before studying political science at the University of Silesia, graduating in 1999. In that year, he was appointed deputy director of Euroregion Cieszyn Silesia, while earning his doctorate from the University of Silesia, which he was granted in 2001 for his thesis A Bridge Between East and West: Edvard Beneš – An Attempt to Preserve the Independence of Czechoslovakia in 1945-1948. He taught at the University of Silesia in Katowice, as well as the Humanitas Academy in Sosnowiec.

As a political scientist, Migalski has well known for his conservative views, as well as the accuracy of his predictions. In 2009, he ran for the European Parliament for Law and Justice, in the Silesian constituency. He was elected, winning 112,881 votes. However, he did not become a member of the party, and was seen as a moderate within the group.

== Member of the European Parliament ==
In September 2009, he strongly condemned Roman Polanski, whose charge for statutory rape in the United States divided Poland. With Civic Platform MEP Sławomir Nitras, in January 2010, Migalski co-authored a resolution that would name the Katyn massacre a 'genocide'. In July 2010, he led a boycott of the beer Lech, after the brand was advertised with an allusion to Lech Kaczyński's death.

In August 2010, he came out in criticism of Jarosław Kaczyński, blaming Kaczyński for Law and Justice's poor poll ratings in a five-page open letter. The open letter divided the party, with more moderate, younger figures in the PiS, including Joanna Kluzik-Rostkowska and Paweł Poncyljusz, both of whom Migalski mentioned in his letter, siding with Migalski. Migalski was ejected from the party's European Parliament delegation the following week, in a resolution written by Ryszard Legutko and Tomasz Poręba.

The split led to three members of the Sejm – Kluzik-Rostkowska, Poncyljusz, and Elżbieta Jakubiak – being ejected from the party. Together with them and fellow MEPs Michał Kamiński, Adam Bielan, and Paweł Kowal, Migalski formed the more centrist Poland Comes First, which was joined by a total of 17 MPs. He remains a member of the European Conservatives and Reformists group, to which both Law and Justice and Poland Come First belongs.

He is a member of the Reconciliation of European Histories Group.
