= Artur Zasada =

Polish politician

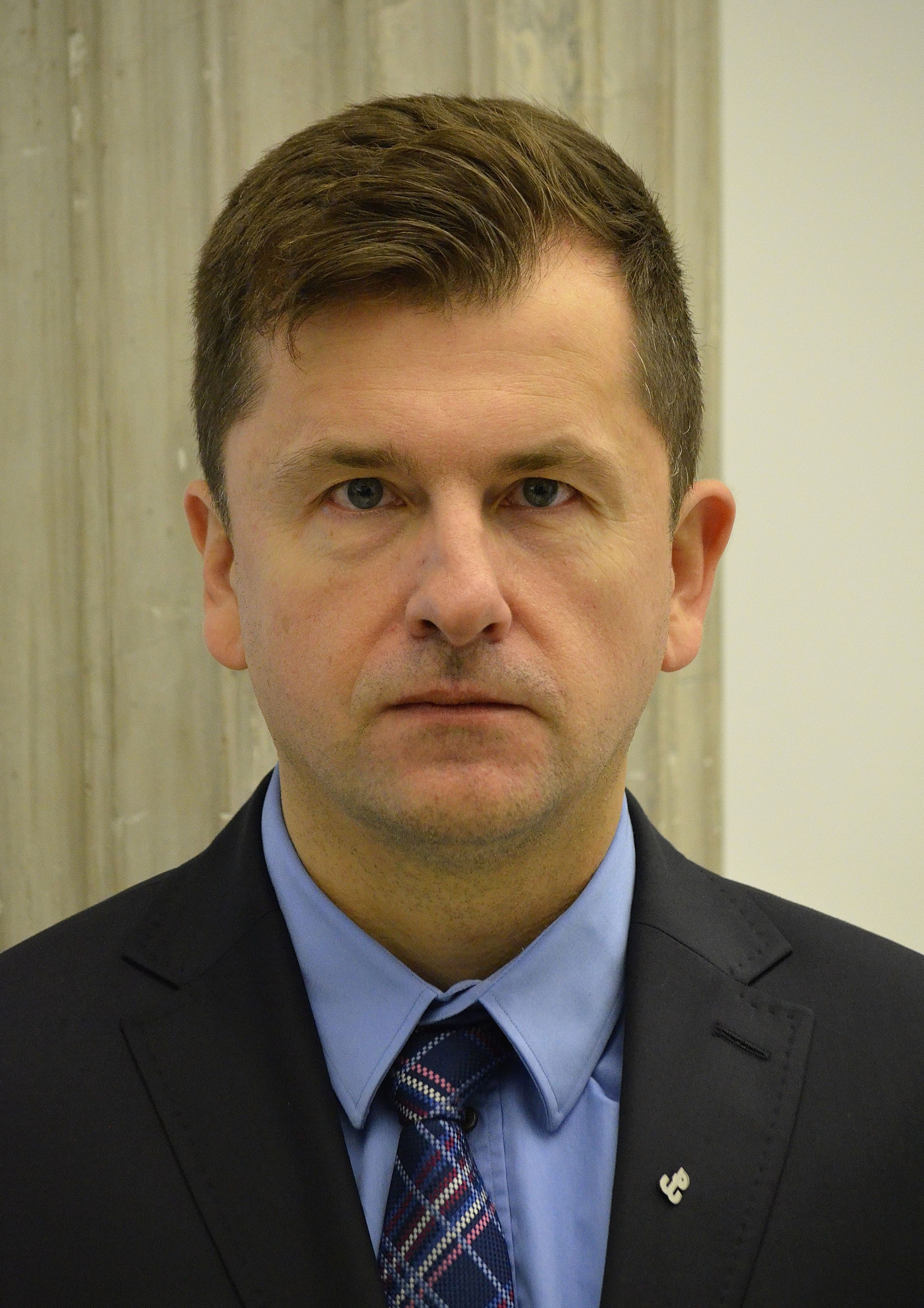
- Zasada in 2015

Members of the European Parliament
- In office 14 July 2009 – 30 June 2014

Personal details
- Born: 5 June 1969 (age 56) Zielona Góra, Poland
- Party: Poland Together
- Other political affiliations: Law and Justice; Civic Platform

Artur Jarosław Zasada (born 5 June 1969) is a Polish politician and a former Member of the European Parliament. A former member of Poland Together and the European Conservatives and Reformists group, having been elected for Civic Platform.

== Biography ==
Zasada was born on 5 June 1969 in Zielona Góra. A lawyer by the profession, graduated from the University of Wrocław. He was employed in PP and Ministry of Communications. Later he worked as a manager for international relations and marketing specialist in a transport company, then he became branch director of the Totalizator Sportowy.

At the end of the 80s he belonged to the opposition Movement for Independent Youth. In the early 90s worked in the police force. Since 1993 he was active in the National Union of Christian and in the years 2001–2002 in the Covenant Right. With them he joined the Law and Justice party, but at the turn of 2003 and 2004 he decided to occur in the party, then he joined the Civic Platform .

In 2006, elected councilor from Civic Platform list in Zielona Góra. In the city council he was a chairman of the Committee on Budget and Finance and the club of Civic Platform councilors. In 2008 he became a member of the Regional Council of Civic Platform. In 2009 European Parliament election in Poland he was elected and became MEP, achieving second place as a candidate from the list of Civic Platform Gorzów County and receiving 25,875 votes. On 30 August 2013 he decided to suspend for three months his membership in the Civic Platform as a gesture of solidarity with two members of the party in Polish Parliament (Jarosław Gowin and Jacek Żalek) who were punished for breaking party group discipline. On 15 November 2013 he announced the withdrawal from the structures of the Civic Platform and started to being involved in the "Godzina dla Polski" movement, created by Jarosław Gowin after his departure from PO.

In the European Parliament he sat on the Committee on Transport and Tourism.

== Bibliography ==
- Profile on the European Parliament website
- Biography note on the europarlament.pap.pl
