= Andrzej Sośnierz =

Polish politician and physician

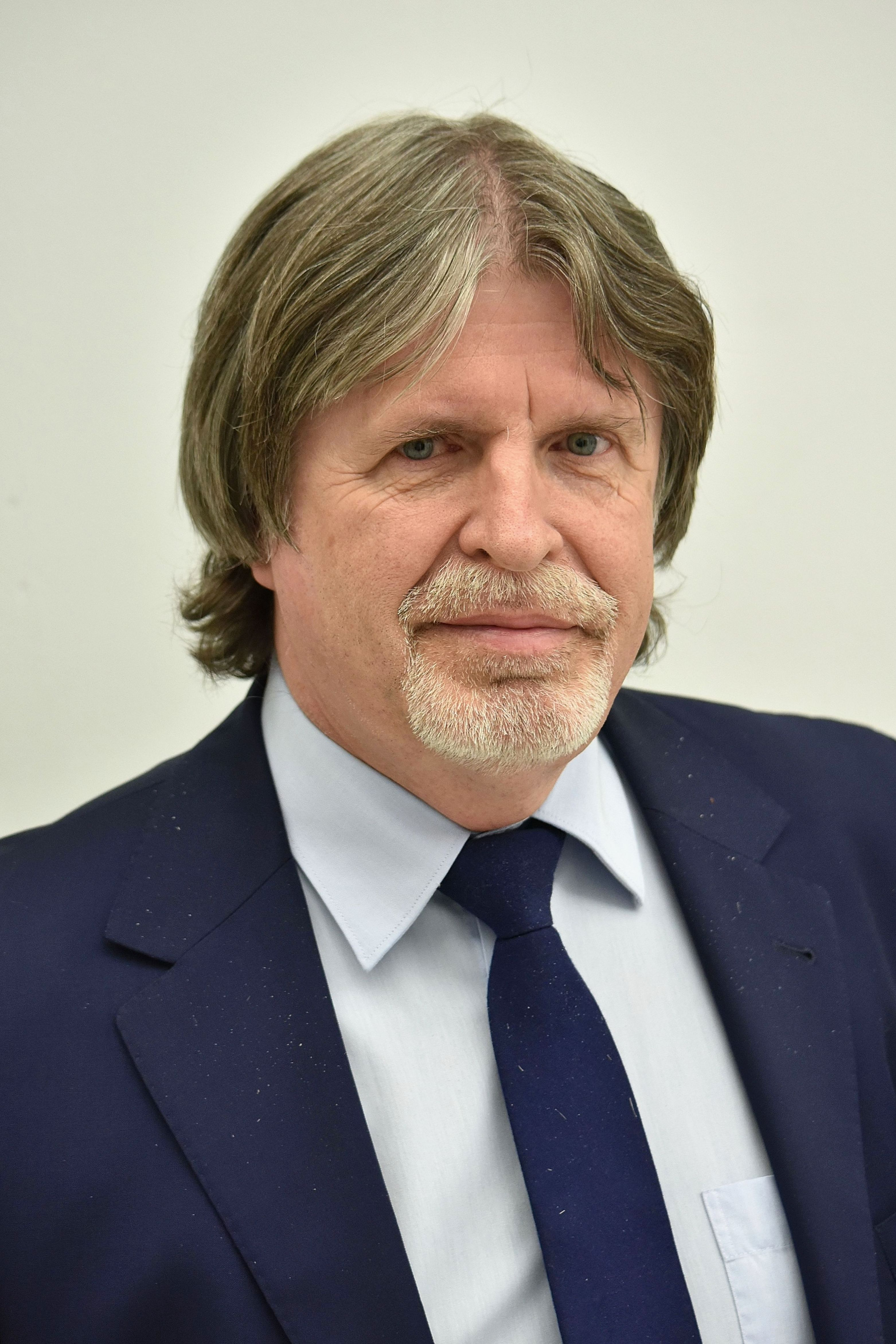

Member of the Sejm
- Incumbent
- Assumed office 25 September 2005
- Constituency: 31 – Katowice

Personal details
- Born: 8 May 1951 (age 75) Głuchołazy
- Party: none
- Other political affiliations: Polish Affairs (2021-present); United Right (2021-present); Liberal Democratic Congress; Real Politics Union; Initiative for Poland; Civic Platform (2005–2006); Law and Justice (2006–10); Poland Comes First (2010-2013); Poland Together (2013-2017); Agreement (2017-2021)
- Relations: Dobromir Sośnierz (son)
- Children: 3
- Education: Medical University of Silesia
- Profession: Physician

Andrzej Stanisław Sośnierz (born 8 May 1951) is a Polish politician and physician and a current member of the Sejm.

== Political career ==
He was elected to Sejm on 25 September 2005, getting 54,876 votes in Katowice, standing for Civic Platform. He left the party after criticising the leadership's negative attitude towards a potential coalition with Law and Justice (PiS). After being expelled, in January 2006, he joined PiS, for whom he ran in the 2007 election. In 2010, he left PiS to join Poland Comes First, when that party was created. Elected in 2015 as a representative of Poland Together. Reelected in 2019.

On 22 June 2022 Sośnierz was thrown out of the Agreement Party after his parliamentary group "Polish Affairs" (Polish: Polskie Sprawy) signed an agreement with Law and Justice. Sośnierz, along with Zbigniew Girzyński and leader of the group Agnieszka Ścigaj confirmed their participation in the ruling United Right coalition as independent MP's.

== See also ==
- Members of Polish Sejm 2005-2007
