= The Republicans (Poland) =

Political party in Poland

Republican Party Partia Republikańska
- Leader: Adam Bielan
- Founder: Przemysław Wipler
- Founded: 22 June 2013 (association); 20 June 2021 (party)
- Dissolved: 23 February 2017 (association); 16 December 2023 (party)
- Split from: Agreement (2021)
- Merged into: Kukiz'15 (2017); Law and Justice (2023)
- Ideology: National conservatism Atlanticism; Soft Euroscepticism
- Political position: Right-wing
- National affiliation: United Right
- European Parliament group: European Conservatives and Reformists

The Republicans (Polish: Republikanie) was a national-conservative political party in Poland, and political association.

It was founded as an association in 2013, which was instrumental in the creation of Kukiz'15, which it joined in 2017. It was resurrected in June 2021 by a pro-Law and Justice and anti-Gowin faction of the Agreement party led by MEP Adam Bielan, who was joined by five of its 18 MPs. This was as a result of an internal split, whereby the newly formed party joined the United Right coalition in power as a full member, as the Gowin-loyalist remainder of the Agreement party left the coalition.

== History ==
=== Foundation of association and its downfall (2013–2017) ===
On 3 June 2013, the founder of the Republican Association, Przemysław Wipler, left the Law and Justice party, announcing the creation of a new political organisation which would be called the "Republicans". They were registered as a political party on 2 August. On 22 August, the party held its founding convention, which hosted, among others, Paweł Kukiz. Przemysław Wipler was appointed president, and Anna Streżyńska appointed vice president. On 23 November, following the election of the new government, Przemysław Wipler continued as the president, defeating Anna Streżyńska at the vote.

At the beginning of 2014, Anna Streżyńska left the "Republicans". On 20 February 2014, a group of "Republicans" activists, led by Przemysław Wipler and Łukasz Wróbel, left Poland. On 10 March, Przemysław Wipler concluded a cooperation agreement with the Congress of the New Right. Some "Republicans" activists, led by Jacek Sierpinski, would later join the Libertarian Party.

In January 2015, many "Republicans" activists supported KORWiN, and Przemysław Wipler became the party's vice president. In the parliamentary elections to the Sejm, the party fielded two candidates, Magdalena Błeńska and Tomasz Jaskóła, and several others associated with the Republican Foundation. On 28 November 2015, at the Third Congress of the "Republicans", Przemysław Wipler stepped down as president, and was replaced by Karol Rabenda, who at the same time led KORWiN in Pomerania.

On 23 February, Karol Rabenda, then president, resigned from the party, as did Magdalena Błeńska, then vice president, and "Republicans" member Anna Siarkowska too resigned and caucused with Kukiz'15.

=== Reactivation, joining the government and merger (2021–2023) ===
On 20 June 2021, the reactivating congress took place. Karol Rabenda took the stage to announce that Agreement members will join the Republican association and restructure it into a party, and that will join the governing coalition as a full member. Law & Justice chairman Jarosław Kaczyński also made a speech praising the reformed party. Another congress took place in September 2021, where Adam Bielan was appointed as new party leader.

In the 2023 parliamentary elections, a few of the party representatives ran for the Sejm from Law and Justice lists, in addition, Andrzej Wojtyła ran for the Senate on behalf of Law and Justice. Four Republican Party activists won seats in the parliament - Kamil Bortniczuk, Michał Cieślak, Arkadiusz Czartoryski and Łukasz Mejza won re-election. They sat in the parliamentary club of the Law and Justice Party. In the next government of Mateusz Morawiecki, appointed in the first constitutional step, representatives of the Republicans were not among the constitutional ministers. On 16 December 2023, at a meeting of the Political Council, the Republican Party together with the Political Council of Law and Justice passed resolutions to merge the two political parties by absorbing the Republican Party into the Law and Justice.

== Program ==
In its party program, the Republicans describe themselves as adhering to "modern conservatism" and encouraging solidarity and social responsibility between Poles while rejecting "leftist collectivism and liberal individualism" in favour of building a sense of community. The party also calls for the Polish government to culturally and economically support Polish expatriates and ethnic Poles living in former Eastern Bloc nations.

The Republicans advocate the creation of single-member constituencies and online voting, as well as enhanced direct democracy. According to its program, the Republicans advocate for economically liberal policies such as commitment to reducing taxes, and the simplification of the tax system. The party also advocates reducing the number of posts in the public administration by at least one-fifth.

The party's family policies include the introduction of a two-year paid maternity leave, the introduction of school vouchers and increased child tax credits. The party is also committed to some policies which "deregulate" the economy, and some support the replacement of the Social Insurance Institution and the Agricultural Social Insurance Fund.

In foreign policy, the party supports Poland developing further ties with NATO and takes a pro-American Atlanticism stance, especially to counteract what it describes as "German-Russian rapprochement" within Europe. The Republicans also call for Poland to have a "proper place in the European family of nations" with an emphasis on playing an important role within the European Union but opposes policies of the EU that impact on sovereignty and argues Poland should have an "overriding principle" to protect its own interests and security first. The party supports bilateral agreements with Britain following Brexit. Leader: Adam Bielan Vice-Leaders: Magdalena Blenska Kamil Bortniczuk Michal Cieslak Arkadiusz Urban Secretary: Marcel Klinoowski Treasurer: Wojciech Kasprowski Chair of the National Council: Karol Rabenda Head of the Country Office: Monika Baran

== Election results ==
=== Sejm ===
Election year	Leader	# of votes	% of vote	# of overall seats won	+/–	Government
2019	Anna Maria Siarkowska	8,051,935	43.6 (#1)	1 / 460	New	Coalition
2019	As a part of the United Right coalition, which won 235 seats in total.					
2023	Adam Bielan	7,640,854	35.4 (#1)	4 / 460	▲3	Opposition
2023	As a part of the United Right coalition, which won 194 seats in total.					
