= Wojciech Murdzek =

Polish politician

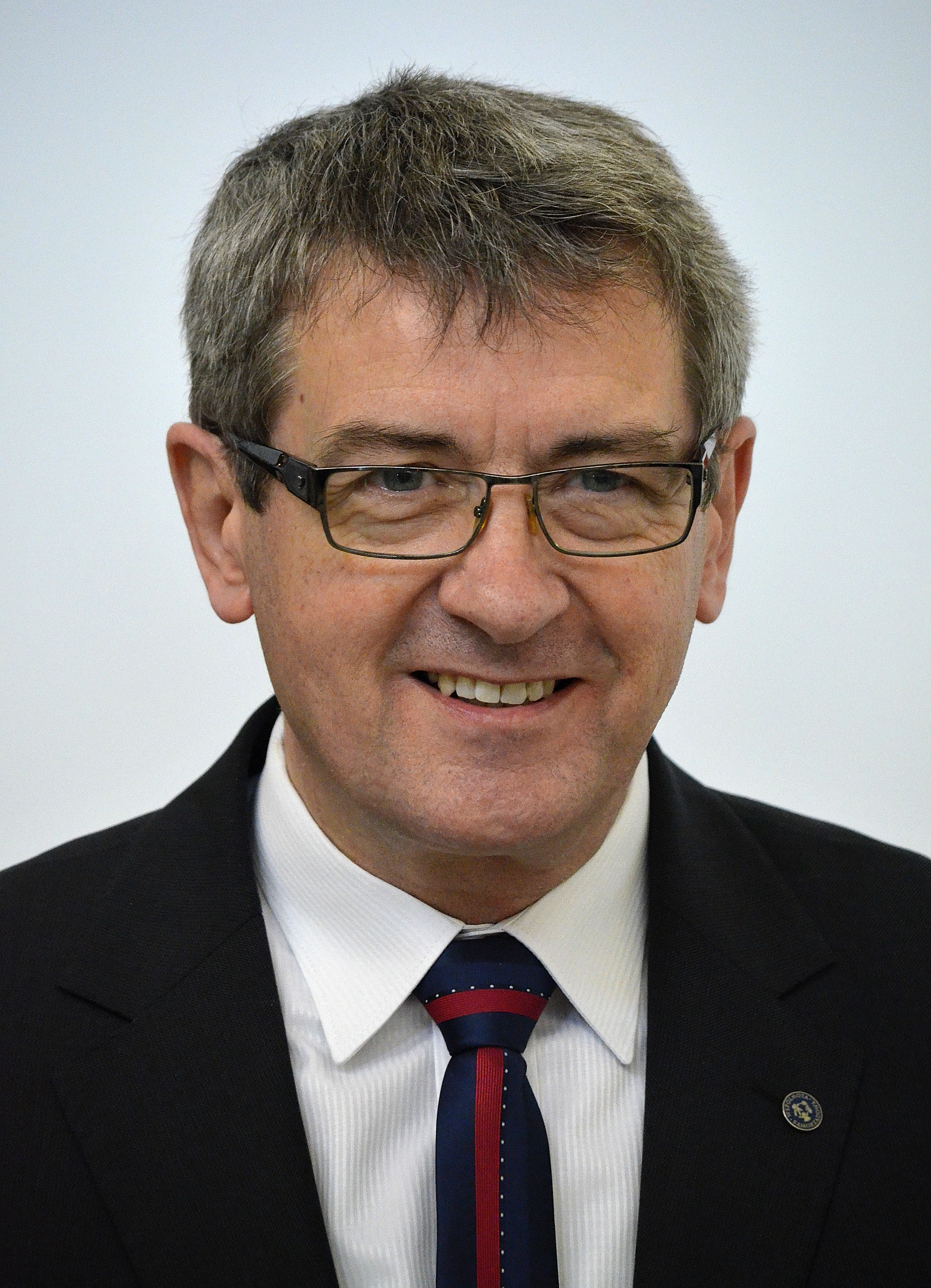

Minister of Science and Higher Education
- In office 16 April 2020 – 6 October 2020
- President: Andrzej Duda
- Prime Minister: Mateusz Morawiecki
- Preceded by: Jarosław Gowin
- Succeeded by: Przemysław Czarnek (As Minister for Education and Science)

President of Świdnica
- In office 2002 – 8 December 2014
- Preceded by: Kazimierz Bełz
- Succeeded by: Beata Moskal-Słaniewska

Personal details
- Born: Wojciech Piotr Murdzek; 13 December 1957 (age 68) Świdnica, Poland
- Party: Wspólnota Samorządowa Ziemi Świdnickiej / Obywatelski Dolny Śląsk (2002–2014); Alliance (2017–present)
- Spouse: Annette Murdzek
- Children: 2
- Education: Wrocław University of Science and Technology
- Profession: politician, parliamentarian, engineer

Wojciech Piotr Murdzek (born 13 December 1957 in Świdnica) – a Polish politician, from 2020 he is Minister of Science and Higher Education, from 2002 to 2014 he was president of Świdnica, also parliamentarian and member of the Sejm.

In 1976 he finished his education at the II Liceum in Świdnica, and in 1981 he finished his studies at the economic department of the Wrocław Polytechnic, where he later completed post-diploma studies in microprocessor technics. Next, he worked as a constructor at ZEM Elmot, and was a director at Procter & Gamble. From 1990 to 1998 he was a vice president of the Świdnica town council. Later he served as starost of the Świdnica powiat. In 2002 he won the elections for president of Świdnica in the second round. In the next elections on the 12 of November 2006 he started with the support of the „Świdnicka Wspólnota Samorządowa”, capturing 56,97% of the vote. In 2010 he won reelection. In 2014 he lost in the second round to Beata Moskal-Słaniewska. Nonetheless he was elected to the council of the Świdnica Powiat. In the 2015 elections he ran for the Sejm from the Law and Justice list as an independent representative of Poland Together. He won a seat in the sejm with 5758 votes. In November 2017 he joined Agreement -a party formed from the transformation of Poland Together, becoming the leader in his Wałbrzych district. In May 2018 he was nominated as a candidate for the Law and Justice list for president of Świdnica in the local elections that year, yet Jacek Drobny became the party's nominee. On July 20, 2018 he became a member of a commission in charge of VAT extortion. In 2019 he won reelection. From December 5, 2019 to 16 April 2020 Vice Minister of Development. Since 16 April 2020 Minister of Science and Higher Education.

He is married with German-born Annette and has 2 children, Natalia and Wiktor.
