= Banaszak =

Banaszak is a Polish surname. Notable people with the surname include:

- Felix Banaszak (born 1989), German politician
- Greg Banaszak (born 1966), American saxophonist
- Hanna Banaszak (born 1957), Polish jazz singer and poet
- John Banaszak (born 1950), American football player and coach
- Pete Banaszak (born 1944), American football player
- Piotr Banaszak (born 1964), Polish weightlifter
- Przemysław Banaszak (born 1997), Polish footballer

== See also ==
- Banaszek
