= Jakub Banaszek =

Polish politician

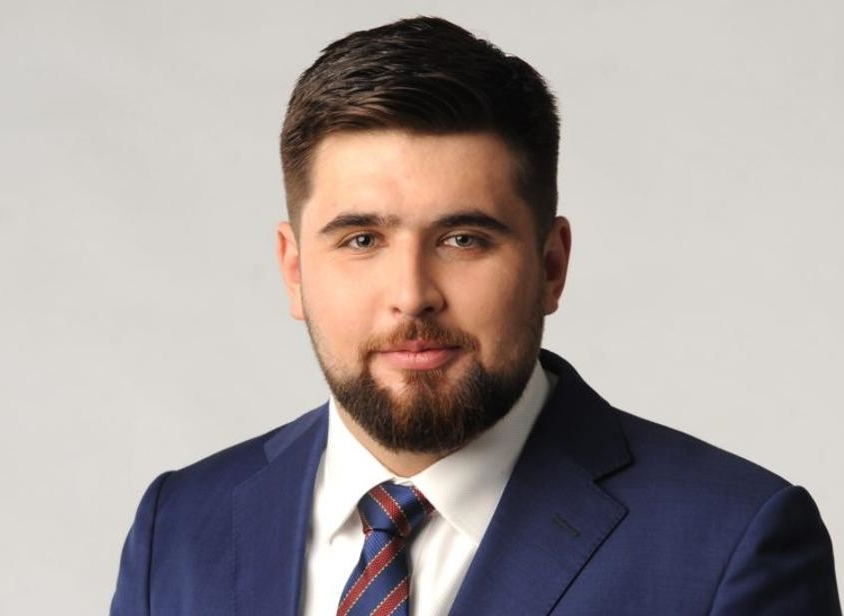
Jakub Banaszek

Jakub Michał Banaszek (born 24 June 1991 in Chełm) is a Polish politician. Since 2018 he is the mayor of Chełm. Currently he is one of the youngest city mayors in Poland. Formerly a member of Agreement, since 2021 he is a member of Renewal.
