= Zbigniew Gryglas =

Polish politician

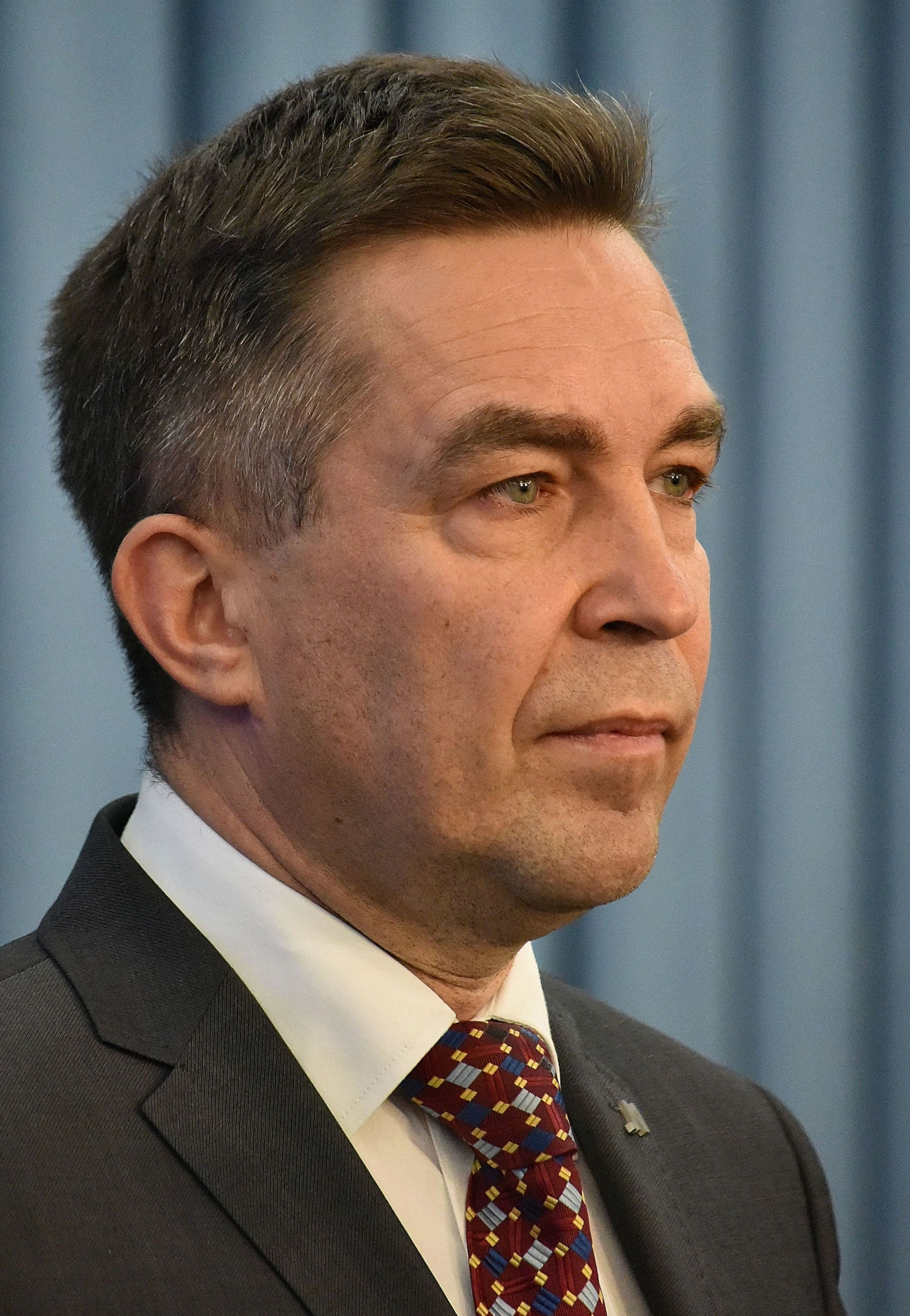

Member of the Sejm
- In office 12 November 2015 – 12 October 2019
- Constituency: Warsaw I

Personal details
- Born: 1 June 1965 (age 60) Jelonki, Warmian-Masurian Voivodeship, Poland
- Party: Modern (2015–2017); Agreement (2017–2021)
- Website: zgryglas.pl

Zbigniew Gryglas is a Polish entrepreneur, manager, politician, civil servant and philanthropist. Graduated from Olsztyn University, National School of Public Administration and Warsaw School of Economics. He served many years in Ministry of the State Assets supervising state owned companies from energy sector. He is a former member of the Sejm, and formerly the vice president of the Agreement political party. In the years 2019-2021 Deputy Minister of the State Assets and the plenipotentiary of the Offshore Wind Energy. From 2021 the supervisory board member of the biggest Polish energy group (PGE).

From 2015 to 2017 he was a member of Modern, however in 2017 he left the party citing worldview differences. In February 2021 he was permanently removed from the Agreement party.

He is married and has 3 sons.
