= Jacek Żalek =

Polish politician (born 1973)

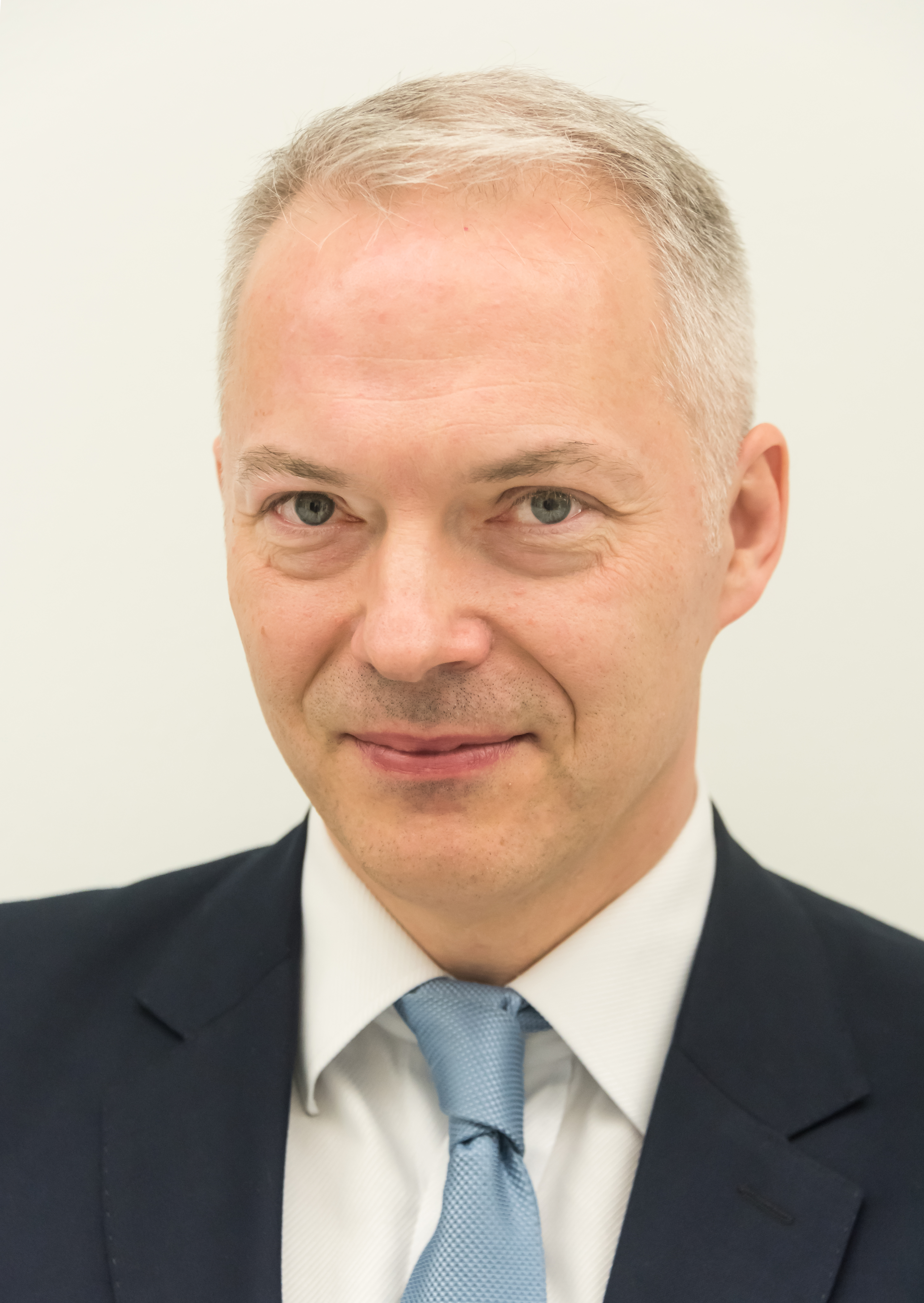
- Jacek Żalek in 2022

Deputy of the Sejm
- In office 5 November 2007 – 12 November 2023
- Constituency: 24 Białystok

Personal details
- Born: 13 January 1973 (age 53) Białystok, Polish People's Republic
- Party: Law and Justice
- Other political affiliations: Civic Platform (until 2015)

Jacek Żalek (born 13 January 1973 in Białystok) is a Polish politician. He is a member of the VI, VII, VIII and IX Sejm. He is also a member of the Agreement political party.

During the 2020 Polish presidential election campaign Żalek has stated in a live television broadcast that "LGBT are not people, it's an ideology". He then said that there were homosexuals before the LGBT movement, after which he was kicked from the studio. He later stated that making it seem that he said "LGBT aren't people" was a manipulation on the part of the journalist.
