= Michał Wypij =

Polish politician

Michał Piotr Wypij (born 13 December 1985 in Wrocław) is a Polish politician, member of the IX Sejm, elected in 2019. He is a member of the Agreement political party.

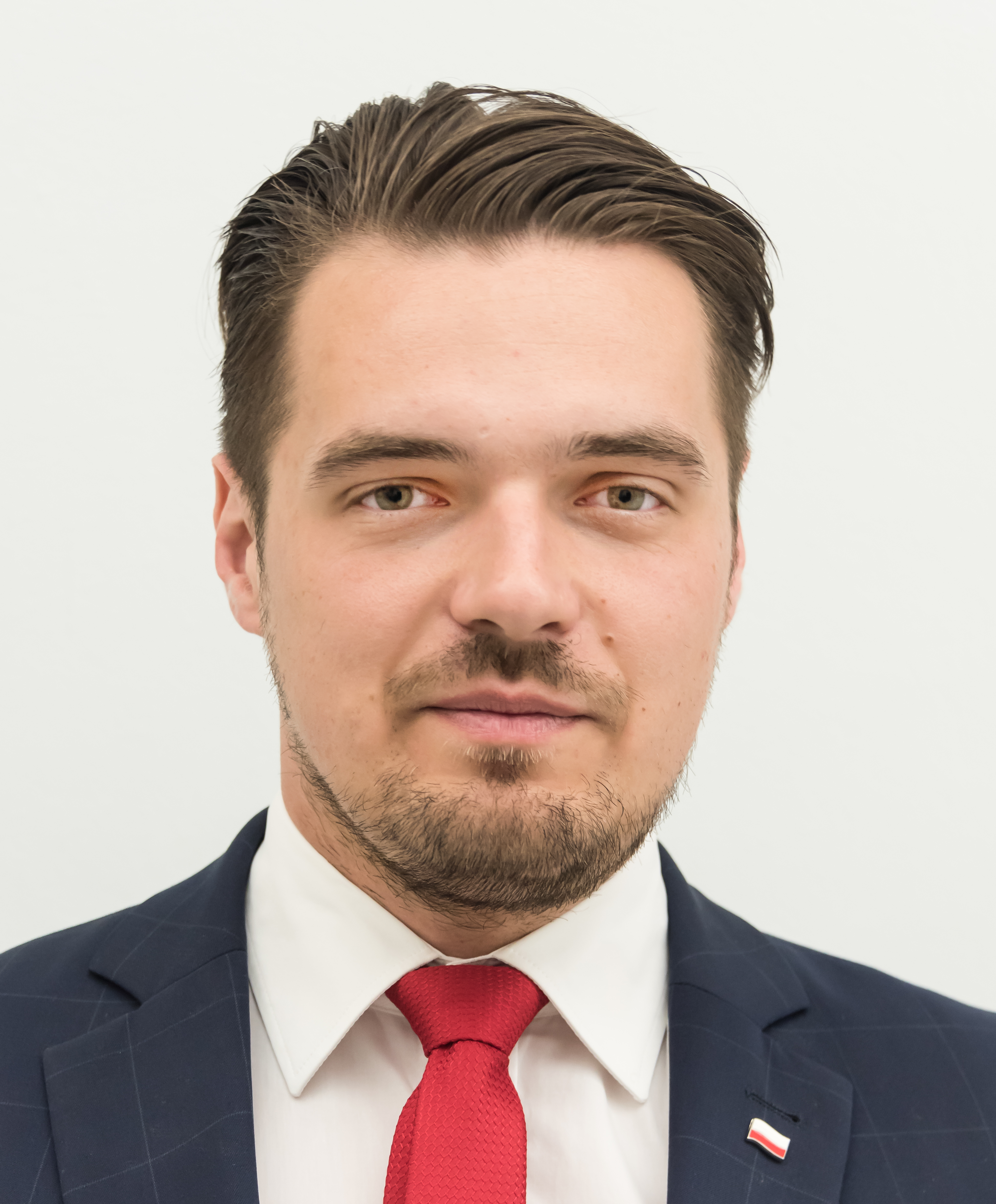
Michał Wypij in 2022
