= Marek Biernacki =

Polish lawyer and politician

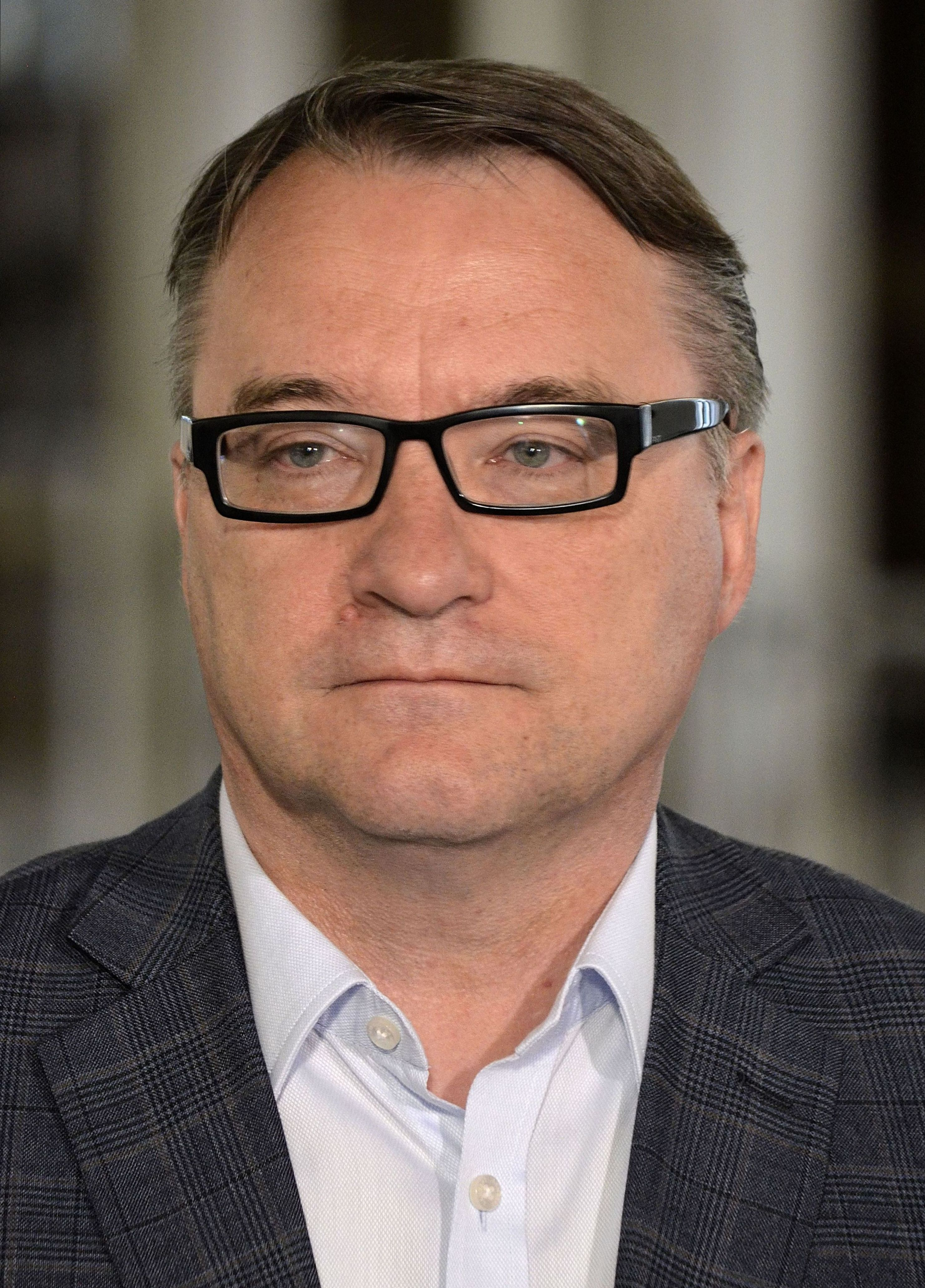

Minister of Justice
- In office 6 May 2013 – 22 September 2014
- President: Bronisław Komorowski
- Prime Minister: Donald Tusk
- Preceded by: Jarosław Gowin
- Succeeded by: Cezary Grabarczyk

Minister of Interior and Administration
- In office 7 October 1999 – 19 October 2001
- President: Aleksander Kwaśniewski
- Prime Minister: Jerzy Buzek

Member of the Sejm
- Incumbent
- Assumed office 25 September 2005

Personal details
- Born: 28 April 1959 (age 66) Sopot, Poland
- Party: Solidarity Electoral Action (1997–2001); Civic Platform (2005–2018); Polish Coalition (from 2019)
- Profession: Liquidator, politician

Marek Biernacki (born 28 April 1959 in Sopot) is a Polish lawyer and politician. Biernacki previously served as the Minister of Justice in the cabinet of Prime Minister Donald Tusk between 2013 and 2014 and the Minister of Internal Affairs and Administration under the government of Prime Minister Jerzy Buzek between 1999 and 2001. He was expelled from Civic Platform in January 2018.

== See also ==
- Members of Polish Sejm 2005-2007
