= Paweł Szramka =

Polish politician

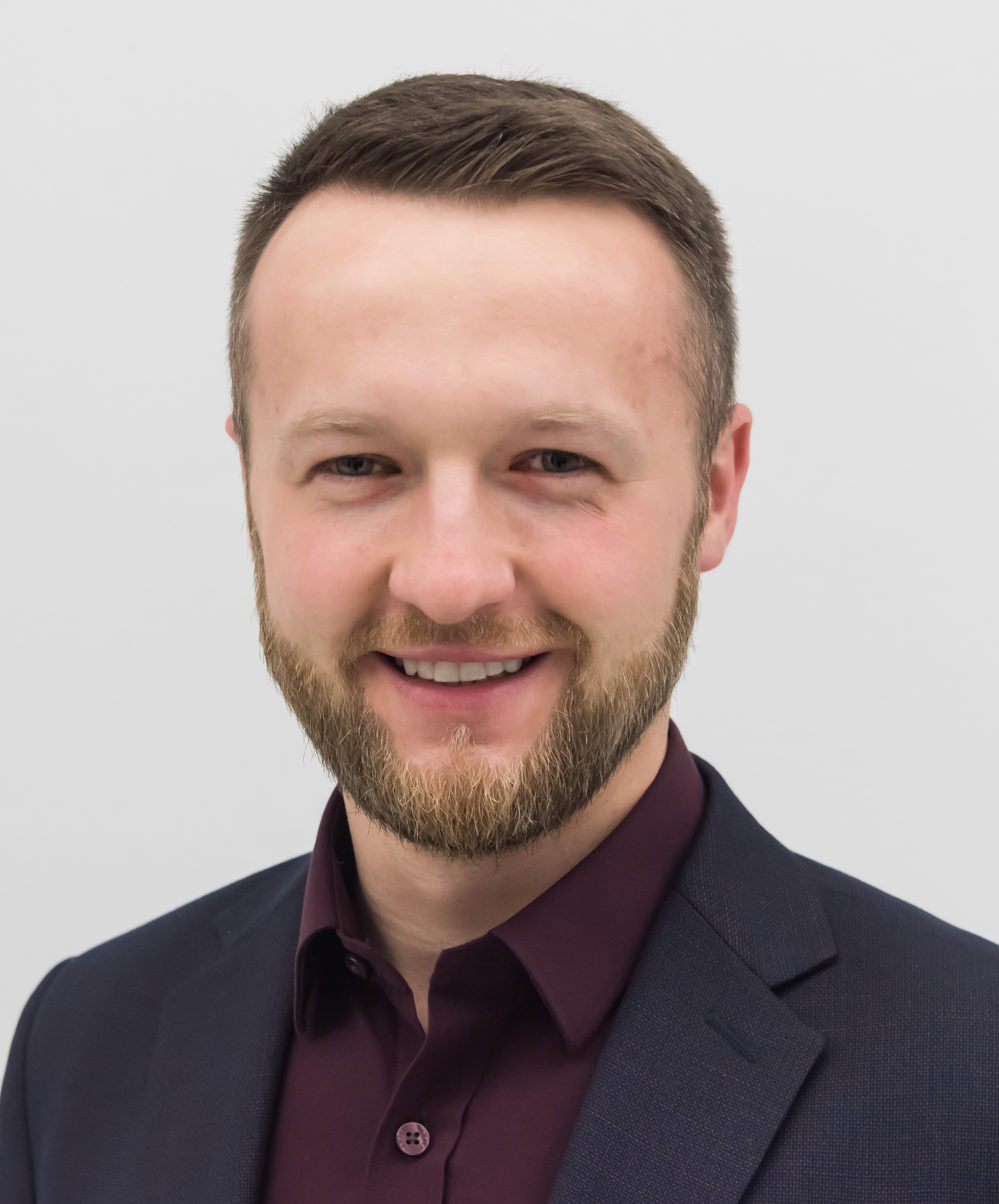
Paweł Szramka in 2020.

Paweł Szramka (born 18 June 1989) is a Polish politician, logistician and professional soldier. The leader of the Good Movement, he has been member of the Sejm since the 2015 election.

== Biography ==
Szramka born in Brodnica.

A logistician by education, he obtained a bachelor's degree in logistics in business (2012) and a master's degree in logistics process management (2015) at the WSB Merito University in Toruń. In 2015, he also completed postgraduate management studies at the Bydgoszcz branch of WSB in Toruń. He became a professional soldier as a private in the 4th Chemical Regiment in Brodnica. He became a professional soldier as a private in the 4th Chemical Regiment in Brodnica.

In 2014, he unsuccessfully ran for councillor in Brodnicy. In 2015, he unsuccessfully worked to eliminate the Municipal Guard in Brodnica.

In the 2015 Polish parliamentary election, he ran for the Sejm in the Toruń district from the first place on the list of the Kukiz'15 electoral committee, organized by Paweł Kukiz. He was elected deputy of the 8th term, receiving 13,552 votes He became the secretary of the parliamentary club of his party. In the 2019 European Parliament election, he unsuccessfully ran for a seat in the European Parliament from the list of the Kukiz'15 committee.

In the 2019 Polish parliamentary election, he received the first place on the list of the PSL candidates to the Sejm in the Toruń parliamentary constituency (as part of the Polish Coalition). He was re-elected as a deputy with 14,404 votes. In the Sejm of the 9th term until 2022, he was deputy chairman of the National Defense Committee. In December 2020, together with other Kukiz'15 MPs, he found himself outside the parliamentary club of the Polish Coalition, becoming an unaffiliated MP. In February 2021, he became a member of the newly established Kukiz'15 parliamentary group - Direct Democracy. On 29 April 2021 together with Agnieszka Ścigaj and Andrzej Sośnierz, he created a parliamentary circle called Polskie Sprawy. He resigned from it on June 22, 2022, after this circle established cooperation with the ruling Law and Justice. In April 2023, he became the national coordinator of the Dobry Ruch party (when it was created from the transformation of the party We Can!).

He is the leader of the Good Movement for the 2023 Polish parliamentary election.

== Personal life ==
In 2020, he married Justyna Kartaszyńska, a model and employee of the parliamentary office of Stanisław Tyszka.
