= Moderate conservatism =

Politically moderate variant of conservatism

Moderate conservatism is a politically moderate version of conservatism that is less demanding than classical conservatism, and can be divided into several subtypes, such as liberal conservatism. The term is principally used in countries where the political camp is divided into liberals (meaning social liberals) on the left and conservatives on the right, rather than in countries whose political camps include social democrats on the left and their opponents on the right. For countries belonging to the former, moderate liberalism is sometimes contrasted with moderate conservatism. The latter term can be applied to several countries, such as the United States, Poland, South Korea, and Japan.

== Overview ==
Moderate conservative is not often used in most parts of Europe, where social democracy or socialist parties have grown into major parties since the early 20th century, because moderate conservatives in many European countries are liberal conservatives or Christian democrats. Despite this, the term has historically been widely used in Europe, particularly in the mid-19th and earlier century, when liberal-to-radical politics, or classical radicalism, formed the mainstream left in Europe and conservatives were the right opposition. The moderate conservatives of this period were contrasted with the moderate liberals. It is also used as a contrast to ultra-conservatism.

== By country ==
=== Canada ===
The main factions of the Conservative Party of Canada are the Red Tory and Blue Tory. Blue Tories value free markets but vary on social policies, Red Tories are known to be more centrist.

=== Iran ===
Moderate conservatism is mostly seen among Reformists: dissident media Iran International referred to Hassan Rouhani, the 7th President of Iran, as a "moderate conservative", however, during his 2017 reelection campaign, Rouhani's views moved firmly to the left and he fully aligned with Reformists.

Ali Larijani was part of the Principlists, but was described as a relatively moderate conservative. However, centre-right "moderate conservatives" such as Larijani are sometimes excluded from the narrow definition of far-right "Principlists."

=== Japan ===
The Kōchikai was a faction that represented moderate conservatives within the right-wing Liberal Democratic Party. Former prime minister Fumio Kishida was a member of the Kōchikai faction, and he is also a "moderate conservative". Yomiuri Shimbun is a moderately conservative newspaper. Yomiuri Shimbun places more emphasis on moderate pro-American diplomacy rather than hawkish Sankei Shimbun.

=== Poland ===
The Civic Platform has supported a moderate conservative agenda. The party is described in various ways in the Polish political context as centre-right, (Note: PO has often been described as centre-right: Aleks Szczerbiak (2012). Poland Within the European Union: New awkward partner or new heart of Europe?. Routledge. p. 2. ISBN 9780415380737.; Nathaniel Copsey (2013). "Poland:An Awkward Partner Redeemed". In Simon Bulmer; Christian Lequesne (eds.). The Member States of the European Union (Second ed.). Oxford University Press. p. 191. ISBN 9780199544837.; Viktor, Szary (9 September 2014). "Poland's PM Tusk, heading for Brussels, submits resignation". Reuters. Archived from the original on 6 March 2016.) or centrist. (Note: PO has often been described as centrist: Marcinkiewicz, Kamil; Stegmaier, Mary (8 January 2016). "The parliamentary election in Poland, October 2015" (PDF). Electoral Studies. 41: 221–224. doi:10.1016/j.electstud.2016.01.004.; Szczerbiak, Aleks (2017). "An anti-establishment backlash that shook up the party system? The October 2015 Polish parliamentary election" (PDF). European Politics and Society. 18 (4): 404–427. doi:10.1080/23745118.2016.1256027. S2CID 157951515.; Siemsen, Pascal (2020). "Voting PiS: Voting Left when Voting Far-Right Populist?". Polish Political Science Review. 8 (1): 87–99. doi:10.2478/ppsr-2020-0006.)

=== South Korea ===
In the 20th century, liberal in South Korea had the opposite meaning of socialist or left-wing. Therefore, some historical liberals in South Korea were considered conservatives or moderate conservatives. Ahn Cheol-soo was considered centrist reformist or centrist liberal (sometimes centre-left) in the early and mid 2010s but is now classified as centre-right and moderate conservative. Yoo Seong-min and Choung Byoung-gug are representative moderate conservatives. JoongAng Ilbo, a South Korean media outlet, is considered moderate conservative.

=== Sweden ===
The major traditional right-wing party in Sweden was initially called the Conservative Party and later the Rightist Party, before adopting the Moderate Party name in 1969 to shed its ultraconservative image and espouse more classical liberal politics.

=== Taiwan ===
Chiang Ching-kuo, the former president of the Republic of China (Taiwan), collaborated with moderate conservative intellectuals, beginning to ease the authoritarian rule of his father and former president Chiang Kai-shek. Chiang Ching-kuo lifted Martial law in Taiwan in 1987, ending four decades of "White Terror."

Today, moderate conservatives in Taiwan are referred to as 'Light blue'; they oppose pro-Beijing extremism or Taiwan independence, and support anti-communism, liberal democracy and ROC-centered Chinese unification. Some 'Light blue', including Johnny Chiang, tend to be closer to Huadu politics than to Chinese unification.

=== United States ===
The Republican Main Street Partnership is a Republican Party organization for moderate Republicans, who are usuallymoderate conservatives. Moderate conservatives are, sometimes pejoratively, called "Republicans in Name Only" by more traditional conservatives. A prominent moderate conservative United States president was George H. W. Bush.

== Moderate conservative political parties and caucuses ==
- Åland: Moderate Coalition for Åland
- Australia: Moderates (Liberal Party of Australia faction)
- Canada: Red Tory (Conservative Party faction)
- Chile: Democrats
- Iran: Executives of Construction Party, Voice of the Nation
- Japan: Kōchikai (Liberal Democratic Party faction), Komeito
- Poland: Renewal of the Republic of Poland, Development Plus
- Sweden: Moderate Party
- United Kingdom: One Nation Conservatives (Conservative Party faction)
- United States: Republican Main Street Partnership (Republican Party faction)
