= Marcin Ociepa =

Polish politician

Marcin Michał Ociepa
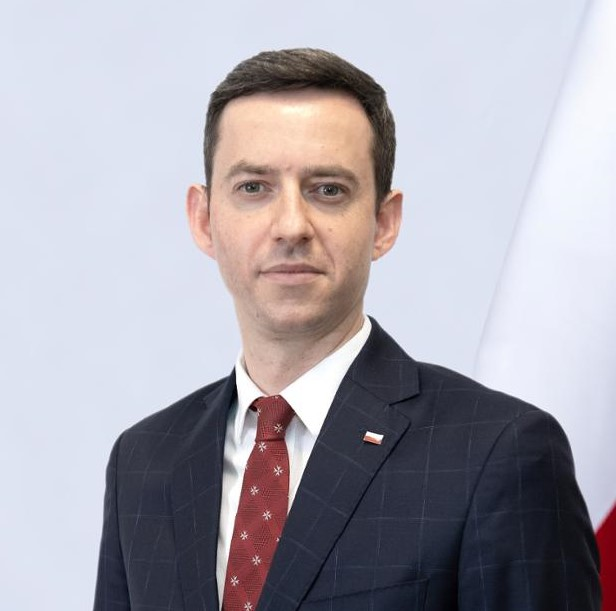
- Marcin Ociepa

Leader of the Renewal of the Republic of Poland
- Incumbent
- Assumed office 3 September 2021
- Preceded by: New party

Member of the Sejm
- Incumbent
- Assumed office 13 October 2019

Personal details
- Born: October 21, 1984 (age 41) Opole, Poland
- Party: Renewal of the Republic of Poland (since 2021); Law and Justice (before 2021)
- Other political affiliations: United Right; Agreement (before 2021)

Marcin Michał Ociepa (born 21 October 1984 in Opole) is a Polish politician. He has been a member of the Sejm since the 2019 election after being elected on the Law and Justice list. He has been a member and Vice President of the Agreement political party until 2021. He currently heads the OdNowa RP political party. He previously served as the town councilor in Opole between 2010 and 2018, and from 2018 to 2019 he served as the member of the Opole sejmik. Since 2019, he has been the Vice-Minister of National Defense.
