= Poland Together =

Poland Together Polska Razem
- Leader: Jarosław Gowin
- Vice Chairmen: Adam Bielan; Marek Zagórski; Jadwiga Emilewicz; Marcin Ociepa
- Founded: 7 December 2013
- Dissolved: 4 November 2017
- Merger of: Poland Comes First; Conservative People's Party
- Split from: Civic Platform; Law and Justice
- Preceded by: Poland Comes First
- Merged into: Agreement
- Headquarters: ul. Piękna 3/8; 00-539 Warszawa
- Youth wing: Młoda Prawica
- Ideology: Liberal conservatism Soft Euroscepticism
- Political position: Centre-right
- National affiliation: United Right
- European Parliament group: European Conservatives and Reformists
- Colours: Green, Blue

Website
- polskarazem.pl//

Poland Together (Polish: Polska Razem, PR or PRZP), formally Poland Together United Right (Polska Razem Zjednoczona Prawica), was a conservative-liberal political party in Poland. The party was founded on 7 December 2013 by former Minister of Justice and Civic Platform member Jarosław Gowin and members of centre-right political parties Poland Comes First and Conservative People's Party.

Between 2013 and 2014, it had four members of the European Parliament: Adam Bielan, independent politician, initially from Law and Justice party, Paweł Kowal and Marek Migalski, who both joined from Poland Comes First, and Artur Zasada, who joined from Civic Platform. They sat in the European Conservatives and Reformists (ECR) parliamentary group.

In the 2015 presidential election, PR supported the victorious Law and Justice candidate for President of Poland, Andrzej Duda. Politics of Poland Together join the election lists under Law and Justice in 2015 Polish parliamentary election and gained 8 seats in Sejm and 6 in Senat. After the elections, some local politicians were elected to parliament, 4 regional leaders of party obtained seats in regional councils (sejmiks), totataling in 12. President of Poland Together Jarosław Gowin became the deputy prime minister, and minister of Science and Higher Education, Piotr Dardziński became deputy minister of Gowin's ministry, Jadwiga Emilewicz became deputy minister of Development, Marek Zagórski became deputy minister of National Treasure, Adam Bielan was elected as the Deputy Speaker of the Senate.

In October 2017, Gowin announced that at its next congress, PR would dissolve into a new party including elements from the Republican Association, libertarian activists and local government. Shortly after this announcement, independent MP Magdalena Błeńska and Senator Józef Zając joined the party. At the congress on 4 November, PR officially dissolved and joined the new Agreement party.

== Election results ==
=== Sejm ===
Election	# of votes	% of vote	# of overall seats won	+/–	Government
2015	5,711,687	37.6 (#1)	8 / 460	New	PiS-led Coalition
2015	As a part of a coalition with Law and Justice, which won 235 seats in total.				

=== European Parliament ===
Election	# of votes	% of vote	# of overall seats won	+/–	EP Group
2014	223,733	3.34 (#8)	0 / 51	New	–
