= Andrzej Gut-Mostowy =

Polish politician (born 1960)

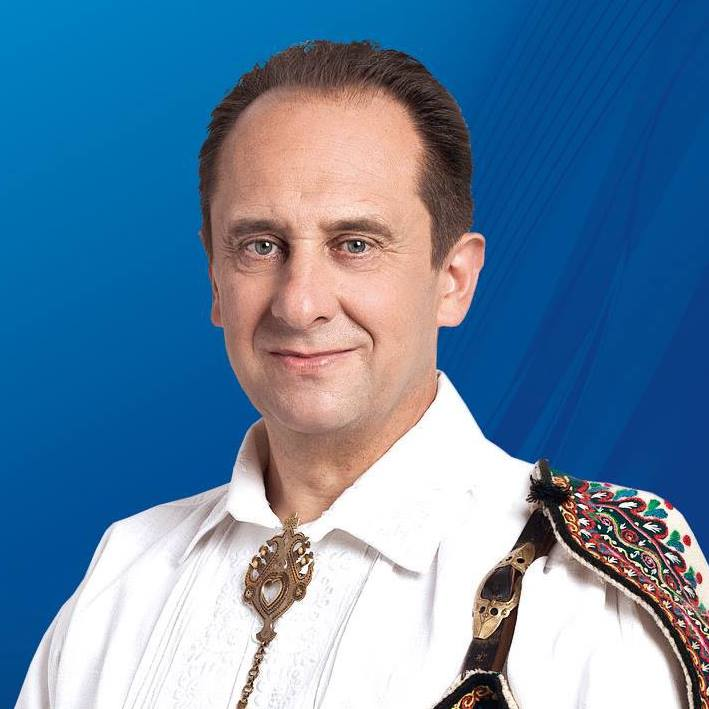

member of Sejm 2005-2007
- In office 25 September 2005 – 2015

Personal details
- Born: 30 October 1960 (age 65) Zakopane
- Party: Agreement, Civic Platform (former), Solidarity Electoral Action (former)

Andrzej Józef Gut-Mostowy (born 30 October 1960) is a Polish politician. He was elected to the Sejm on 25 September 2005, getting 11,282 votes in the 14 Nowy Sącz district, starting from the Civic Platform list. Reelected 2007, 2011 and 2015.

Since 2017 member of Agreement. In 2019 elected to the Sejm from the lists of Law and Justice.

== See also ==
- Members of Polish Sejm 2005-2007
