= Grzegorz Piechowiak =

Polish politician

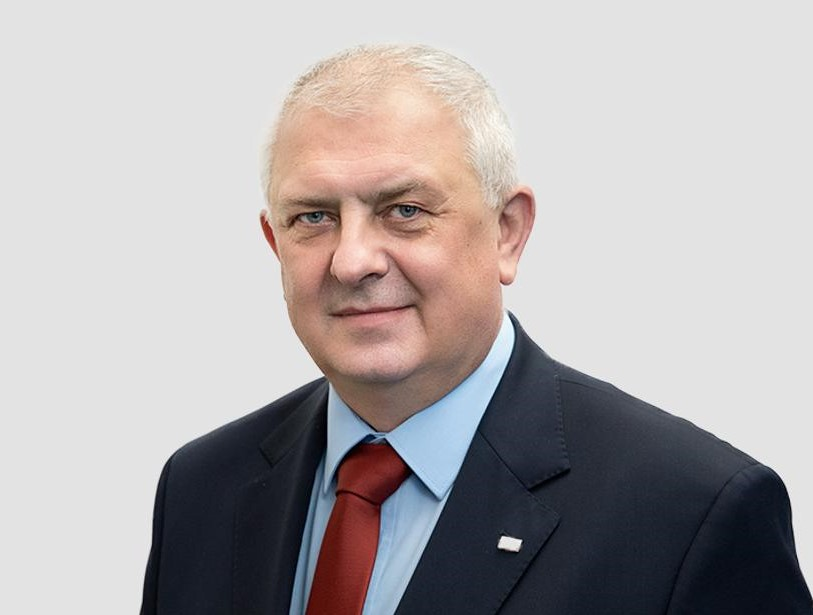
Grzegorz Piechowiak

Grzegorz Piechowiak (born 14 September 1963 in Piła) – is a Polish politician, member of the III, VIII and IX Sejm. Member of Agreement.
