= Anna Dąbrowska-Banaszek =

Polish doctor and politician

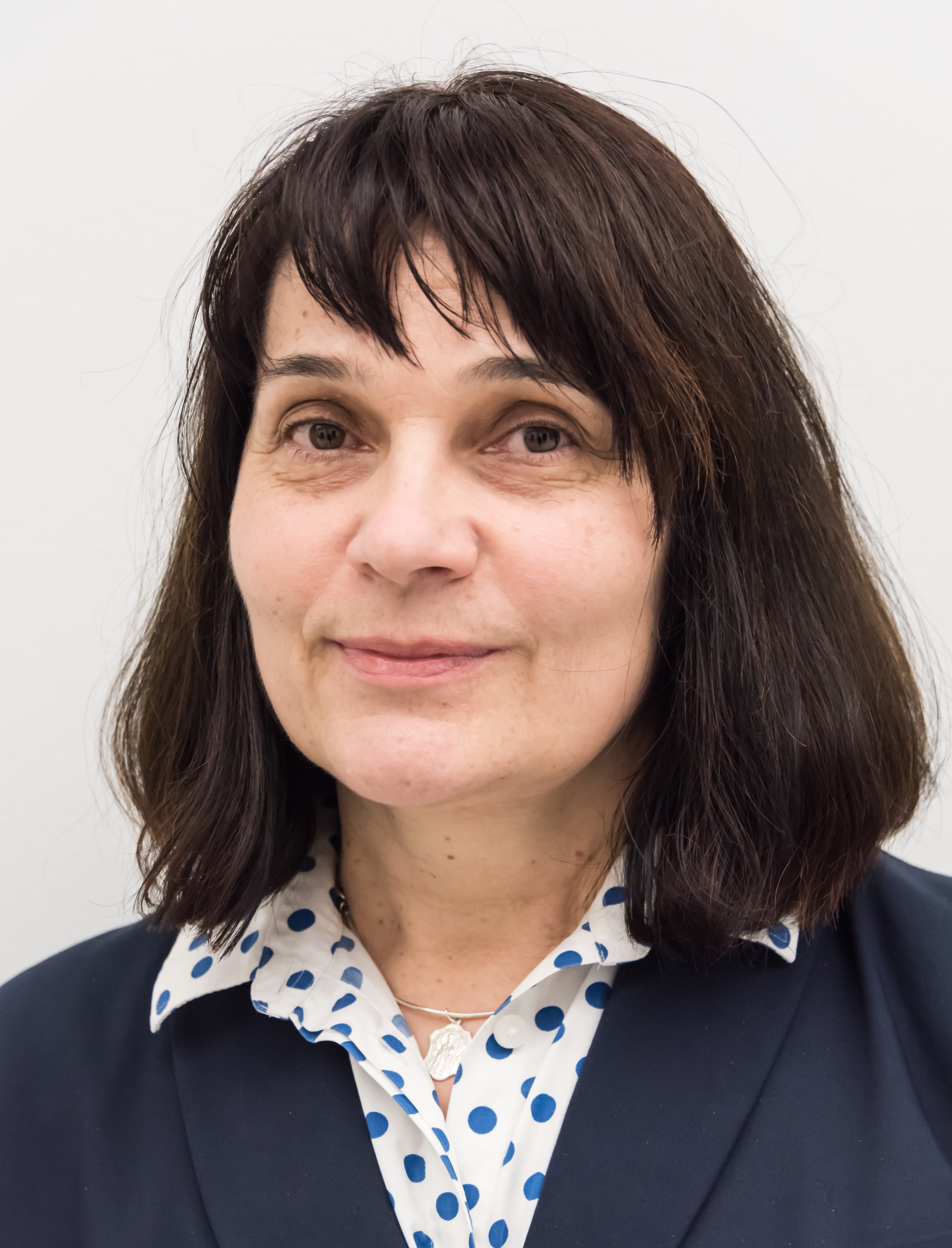

Member of the Sejm
- Incumbent
- Assumed office 2019
- Constituency: 7-Chełm

Personal details
- Party: Law and Justice (by 2023)
- Other political affiliations: Agreement (before 2023)
- Education: Medical University of Lublin (1986)
- Profession: Physician, politician

Anna Dąbrowska-Banaszek (born 14 April 1961 in Chełm) is a Polish doctor, and member of the IX Sejm. She is associated with Agreement, a social-conservative economic-liberal party.
