= Adam Bielan =

Polish politician

Adam Bielan MEP
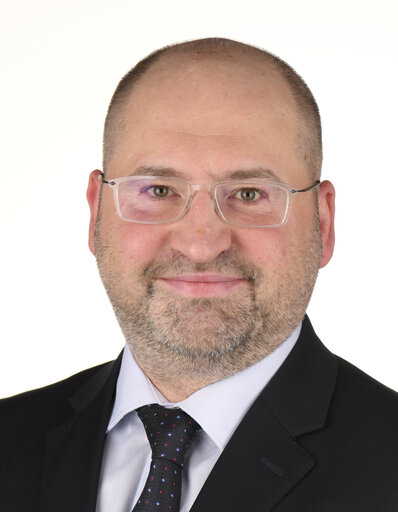

President of the European Conservatives and Reformists Party
- Incumbent
- Assumed office 12 September 2026
- Vice President: George Simion
- Preceded by: Mateusz Morawiecki

Vice-Chair of the European Conservatives and Reformists Polish Delegation
- In office 24 June 2009 – 14 July 2009
- Served alongside: Jan Zahradil

Member of the European Parliament
- In office 1 May 2004 – 17 April 2014
- Constituency: Lesser Poland and Świętokrzyskie (2004–2009); Masovian (2009–2014)
- Incumbent
- Assumed office 2 July 2019
- Constituency: Masovian

Member of the Sejm
- In office 20 October 1997 – 16 June 2004
- Constituency: National list (1997–2001); Chrzanów (2001–2004)

Deputy Marshal of the Senate
- In office 12 November 2015 – 28 May 2019

Member of Senate
- In office 12 November 2015 – 28 May 2019

Personal details
- Born: 12 September 1974 (age 52) Gdańsk, Poland
- Party: Law and Justice (2002–2010, 2023–present)
- Other political affiliations: Solidarity Electoral Action (1997–1998); Conservative People's Party (1999–2001); Right Alliance (2001–2002); Poland Comes First (2010–2011); Poland Together (2013–2017); Agreement (2017–2021); The Republicans (2021–2023)
- Education: Warsaw School of Economics
- Website: www.bielan.pl

Adam Jerzy Bielan ([ˈadam ˈjɛʐɨ ˈbjɛlan], born on 12 September 1974 in Gdańsk, Poland) is a Polish politician, Member of the European Parliament for Lesser Poland and Świętokrzyskie and Masovian between 2004 and 2014, and from 2019 MEP for Masovian constituency. Member of the Senate and the Deputy Marshal of the Senate of the Republic of Poland 2015–2019. He became the president of the European Conservatives and Reformists Party in 2026, after Mateusz Morawiecki resigned.

Bielan sits on the European Parliament's Committee on Regional Development. Bielan is a substitute for the Committee on Transport and Tourism, a member of the Delegation for relations with Mercosur and a substitute for the Delegation to the ACP-EU Joint Parliamentary Assembly.

== Biography ==
Bielan was chairman of the Independent Students' Union from 1996 to 1998. In September 1997, he was elected to the Sejm for Solidarity Electoral Action on the national list: 9 days after his 23rd birthday. The following year, he joined the Conservative People's Party. In 1999, he became vice-chairman of the European Democrat Students, in which capacity he served for one year.

He joined the Right Alliance (PP) when it was formed in 2001, and ran successfully on the Law and Justice (PiS) list in that year's election in Chrzanów. He joined Law and Justice when the PP merged into it in 2002. He was appointed to the European Parliament on Poland's accession on 1 May 2004 and was re-elected in the election in June 2004, representing Lesser Poland and Świętokrzyskie, which includes Chrzanów.

Together with fellow MEP Michał Kamiński, Bielan was behind Lech Kaczyński's successful campaign in the 2005 presidential election. In 2007, Bielan was elected as the Vice President of the European Parliament, as the representative of Union for Europe of the Nations, to which PiS belonged.

Bielan was re-elected to the European Parliament at the 2009 election, and joined the European Conservatives and Reformists group with PiS. He was elected one of the ECR's two Vice-Chairmen, with Michał Kamiński as chairman. Along with Kamiński and two other MEPs, Bielan became associated with the Poland Comes First party in November 2010. They continued to sit with the ECR in the Parliament and Bielan continued to be group Vice-Chairman. Bielan left Poland Comes First on 18 March 2011 to sit as an independent. He joined the newly found Poland Together party in January, 2014. He was excluded from the party in 2021.
