= Agnieszka Ścigaj =

Polish politician (born 1975)

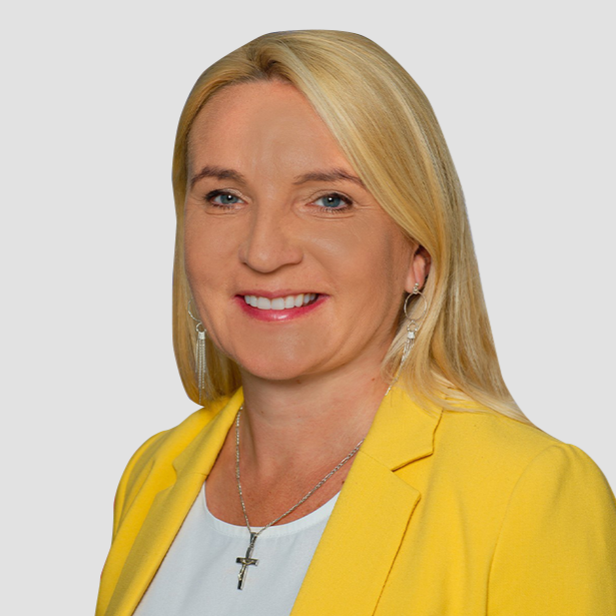

Member of the Sejm
- Incumbent
- Assumed office 12 November 2015
- Constituency: Kraków

Minister without portfolio
- In office 22 June 2022 – 27 November 2023

Personal details
- Born: 22 December 1975 (age 50)
- Party: Law and Justice (since 2023)

Agnieszka Ścigaj (born 22 December 1975) is a Polish politician serving as a member of the Sejm since 2015. From 2022 to 2023, she served as minister without portfolio.
