= First Morawiecki cabinet =

Government of Poland from 2017 to 2019

First Mateusz Morawiecki Cabinet
- 19th Cabinet of Poland
- 2017–2019
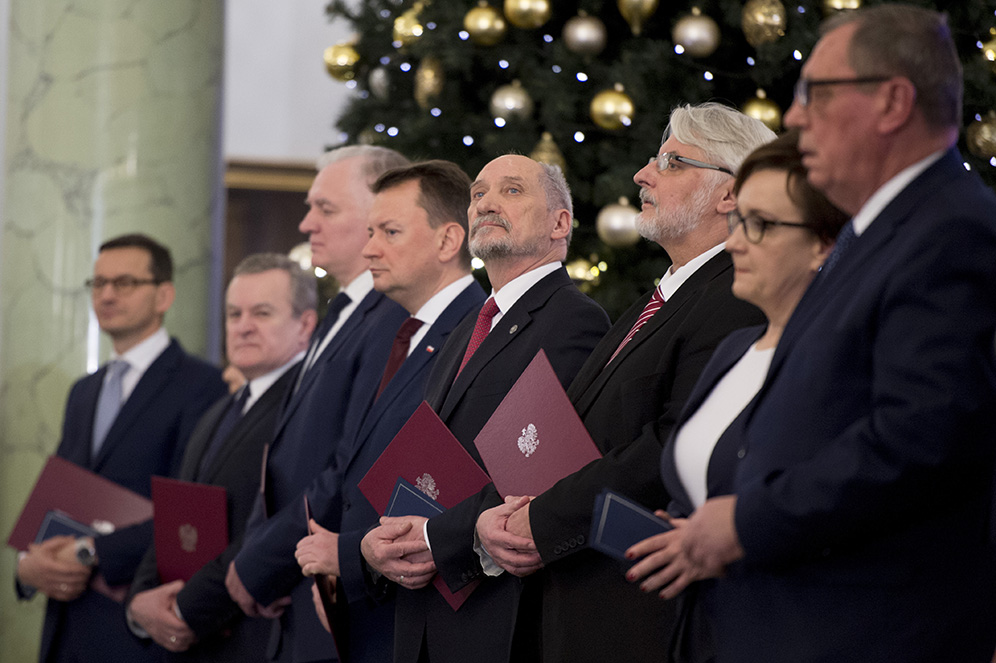
- Date formed: 11 December 2017
- Date dissolved: 15 November 2019

People and organisations
- Head of state: Andrzej Duda
- Head of government: Mateusz Morawiecki
- Head of government's history: 2017–2023
- Deputy head of government: Beata Szydło, Piotr Gliński, Jarosław Gowin
- Member parties: Law and Justice Agreement United Poland
- Status in legislature: Majority
- Opposition party: Civic Platform Kukiz'15 Modern Polish People's Party; Free and Solidary (confidence 2017-2018)
- Opposition leader: Grzegorz Schetyna

History
- Election: 2015 Polish parliamentary election
- Predecessor: Szydło
- Successor: Morawiecki II

First Cabinet of Mateusz Morawiecki formed the previous government of Poland between 2017 and 2019, following Szydło's cabinet. Governing during the 8th legislature of the Sejm and the 9th legislature of the Senate, it was led by Prime Minister Mateusz Morawiecki.

== Members of the Council of Ministers ==
Office	Portrait	Name	Party	In office	
Office	Portrait	Name	Party	From	To
Prime Minister		Mateusz Morawiecki	Law and Justice	11 December 2017	15 November 2019
Minister of Economic Development Minister of Finance		Mateusz Morawiecki	Law and Justice	11 December 2017	9 January 2018
Deputy Prime Minister		Piotr Gliński	Law and Justice	11 December 2017	15 November 2019
Minister of Culture and National Heritage		Piotr Gliński	Law and Justice	11 December 2017	15 November 2019
Deputy Prime Minister		Jarosław Gowin	Agreement	11 December 2017	15 November 2019
Minister of Science and Higher Education		Jarosław Gowin	Agreement	11 December 2017	15 November 2019
Deputy Prime Minister		Beata Szydło	Law and Justice	11 December 2017	4 June 2019
Deputy Prime Minister		Jacek Sasin	Law and Justice	4 June 2019	15 November 2019
Minister of Infrastructure and Construction		Andrzej Adamczyk	Law and Justice	11 December 2017	9 January 2018
Minister of Infrastructure		Andrzej Adamczyk	Law and Justice	9 January 2018	15 November 2019
Minister of Sport and Tourism		Witold Bańka	Law and Justice	11 December 2017	15 November 2019
Minister of Interior and Administration		Mariusz Błaszczak	Law and Justice	11 December 2017	9 January 2018
Minister of National Defence		Mariusz Błaszczak	Law and Justice	9 January 2018	15 November 2019
Minister of Marine Economy		Marek Gróbarczyk	Law and Justice	11 December 2017	15 November 2019
Minister of Agriculture and Rural Development		Krzysztof Jurgiel	Law and Justice	11 December 2017	19 June 2018
Minister		Mariusz Kamiński	Law and Justice	11 December 2017	15 November 2019
Minister of Interior and Administration		Mariusz Kamiński	Law and Justice	14 August 2019	15 November 2019
Minister of the Council of Ministers, Chief of the Chancellery of the Prime Minister		Beata Kempa	United Poland	11 December 2017	4 June 2019
Chief of the Chancellery		Michał Dworczyk	Law and Justice	19 December 2017	15 Novemvber 2019
Minister of the Council of Ministers		Michał Woś	United Poland	4 June 2019	15 November 2019
Minister		Henryk Kowalczyk	Law and Justice	11 December 2017	9 January 2018
Minister of Environment		Henryk Kowalczyk	Law and Justice	9 January 2018	15 November 2019
Minister of National Defence		Antoni Macierewicz	Law and Justice	11 December 2017	9 January 2018
Minister of Health		Konstanty Radziwiłł	Law and Justice	11 December 2017	9 January 2018
Minister of Family, Labour and Social Policy		Elżbieta Rafalska	Law and Justice	11 December 2017	4 June 2019
Minister of Family, Labour and Social Policy		Bożena Borys-Szopa	Law and Justice	4 June 2019	15 November 2019
Minister of Digital Affairs		Anna Streżyńska	Independent	11 December 2017	9 January 2018
Minister of Digital Affairs		Marek Zagórski	Law and Justice	17 April 2018	15 November 2019
Minister of Environment		Jan Szyszko (PiS)	Law and Justice	11 December 2017	9 January 2018
Minister of Energy		Krzysztof Tchórzewski	Law and Justice	11 December 2017	15 November 2019
Minister of Foreign Affairs		Witold Waszczykowski	Law and Justice	11 December 2017	9 January 2018
Minister of the Council of Ministers		Elżbieta Witek	Law and Justice	11 December 2017	18 December 2017
Minister of Interior and Administration		Elżbieta Witek	Law and Justice	4 June 2019	9 August 2019
Minister of National Education		Anna Zalewska	Law and Justice	11 December 2017	4 June 2019
Minister of National Education		Dariusz Piontkowski	Law and Justice	4 June 2019	15 November 2019
Minister of Justice		Zbigniew Ziobro	United Poland	11 December 2017	15 November 2019
Minister of Interior and Administration		Joachim Brudziński	Law and Justice	9 January 2018	4 June 2019
Minister of Foreign Affairs		Jacek Czaputowicz	Independent	9 January 2018	15 November 2019
Minister of Finance		Teresa Czerwińska	Independent	9 January 2018	4 June 2019
Minister of Finance		Marian Banaś	Law and Justice	4 June 2019	30 August 2019
Minister of Entrepreneurship and Technology		Jadwiga Emilewicz	Agreement	9 January 2018	15 November 2019
Minister of Investment and Economic Development		Jerzy Kwieciński	Independent	9 January 2018	15 November 2019
Minister of Health		Łukasz Szumowski	Independent	9 January 2018	15 November 2019
Minister of Agriculture and Rural Development		Jan Krzysztof Ardanowski	Law and Justice	20 June 2018	15 November 2019

== Policy ==
=== History Law ===
In early 2018, both chambers of the Polish parliament (the Sejm and Senate) adopted an Amendment to the Act on the Institute of National Remembrance criminalising the ascription to Poles collectively of complicity in World War II Jewish-genocide-related or other war crimes or crimes against humanity that had been committed by the Axis powers, and condemning use of the expression, "Polish death camp". The law sparked a crisis in Israel–Poland relations.

=== Social ===
In March 2018 a new Polish law took effect, banning nearly all commerce on Sundays, with supermarkets and most other retailers closed Sundays for the first time since liberal shopping laws were introduced in the 1990s. The law had been passed by the Law and Justice party with Morawiecki's support. The Bill had the support of Solidarity which In 2017, backed a proposal to implement blue laws to prohibit Sunday shopping, a move supported by Polish bishops.
