= Opinion polling on the 2015–2023 Law and Justice government =

Polish government opinion polling

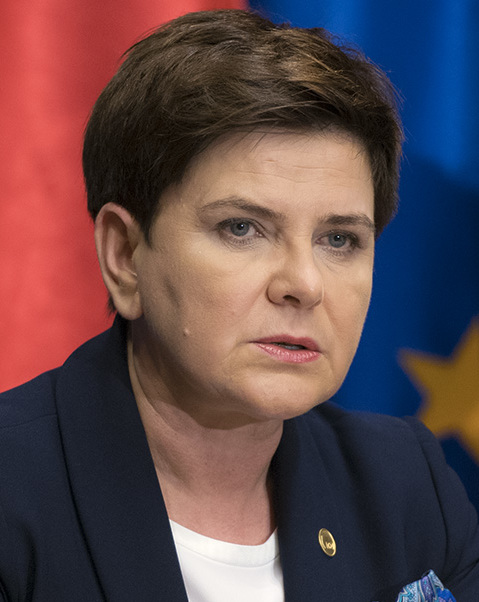
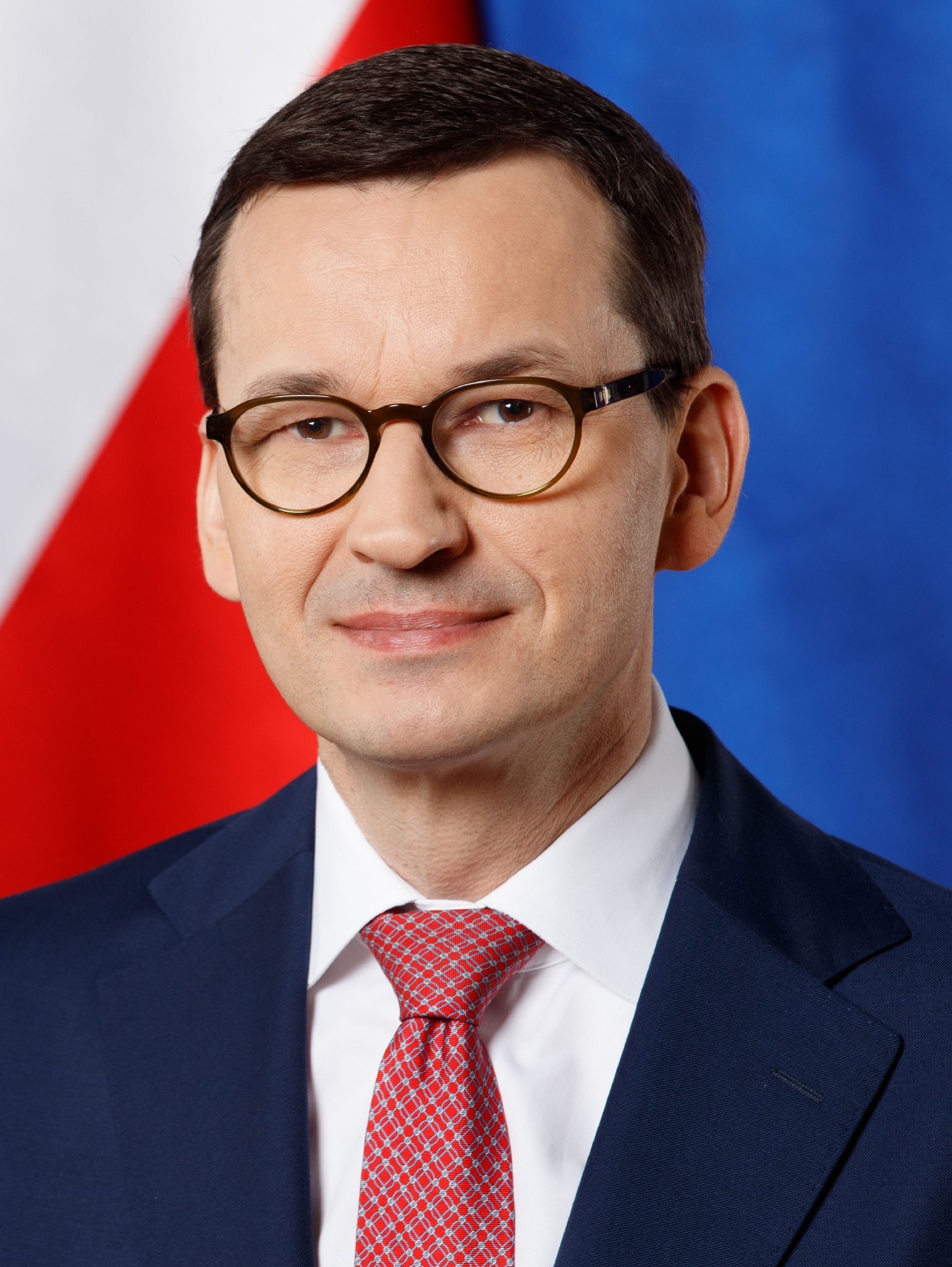
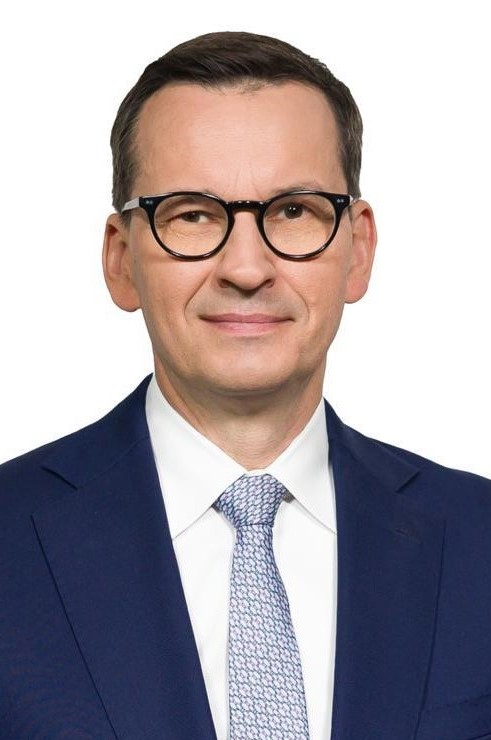
PM Beata Szydło in 2016, PM Mateusz Morawiecki in 2019 and 2023.

The Law and Justice party governed Poland throughout 2015–2023, elected in the 2015 Polish parliamentary election and losing power in the 2023 election. Throughout its period in governance, several polling agencies conducted opinion polls researching support for issues regarding its time in power.

== Prime Ministerial approval polls ==
=== Prime Minister Mateusz Morawiecki ===
Date(s) conducted	Polling firm/Link	Sample size	Approve	Disapprove	Don't know	Net approval
2–11 Oct 2023	CBOS	1,110	36	53	11	–17
14–27 Aug 2023	CBOS	1,024	39	48	13	–9
3–16 Jul 2023	CBOS	1,004	33	57	10	–24
8–18 May 2023	CBOS	1,056	32	56	13	–24
11–20 Apr 2023	CBOS	1,081	34	52	14	–18
14–19 Apr 2023	Kantar Public	1,015	30	62	8	–32
17–22 Mar 2023	Kantar Public	981	27	64	9	–37
9–22 Jan 2023	CBOS	1,028	33	55	13	–22
9–15 Dec 2022	Kantar	1,001	35	57	8	–22
28 Nov–11 Dec 2022	CBOS	1,018	33	54	13	–21
2–7 Dec 2022	Kantar Public	970	26	66	9	–40
7–17 Nov 2022	CBOS	1,038	37	53	10	–16
4–9 Nov 2022	Kantar Public	975	26	64	10	–38
3–13 Oct 2022	CBOS	1,041	29	54	17	–25
14–25 Aug 2022	CBOS	1,043	31	55	14	–24
27 Jun–7 Jul 2022	CBOS	1,084	37	49	14	–12
30 May–9 Jun 2022	CBOS	1,050	35	50	15	–15
3–8 Jun 2022	Kantar Public	1,012	28	62	10	–34
2–12 May 2022	CBOS	1,087	40	45	15	–5
6–7 May 2022	United Surveys / WP.pl	1,000	41.6	49.0	9.4	–7.4
8–13 Apr 2022	Kantar Public	1,008	32	58	10	–26
28 Mar–7 Apr 2022	CBOS	1,030	38	48	14	–10
28 Feb–10 Mar 2022	CBOS	1,078	36	48	16	–12
11–16 Feb 2022	Kantar Public	1,015	31	60	9	–29
21–26 Jan 2022	Kantar Public	1,012	27	63	10	–36
3–13 Jan 2022	CBOS	1,135	33	52	15	–19
10–12 Dec 2021	Kantar / TVN	1,000	34	57	9	–23
29 Nov–12 Dec 2021	CBOS	1,063	34	51	15	–17
26–27 Nov 2021	IBRiS / Onet	1,100	44.6	48.7	6.7	–4.1
4–14 Nov 2021	CBOS	1,100	34	49	17	–15
5 Nov 2021	United Surveys / WP.pl	1,000	40.0	59.2	0.8	–19.2
4–14 Oct 2021	CBOS	1,161	38	46	16	–8
8–12 Oct 2021	Kantar Public	1,002	29	61	10	–32
24–25 Sep 2021	IBRiS / "RZ"	1,100	41.6	49.3	9.1	–7.7
6–15 Sep 2021	CBOS	1,218	37	47	16	–10
3–8 Sep 2021	Kantar Public	1,008	34	56	10	–22
9–14 Jul 2021	Kantar Public	1,004	31	59	10	–28
7–17 Jun 2021	CBOS	1,218	40	43	17	–3
11–15 Jun 2021	Kantar Public	1,011	34	57	9	–23
6–16 May 2021	CBOS	1,163	39	44	17	–5
7–12 May 2021	Kantar Public	1,005	35	56	9	–21
8–9 May 2021	IBRiS / Onet	1,100	42.9	50.2	6.9	–7.3
9–14 Apr 2021	Kantar Public	1,006	30	63	7	–33
1–11 Mar 2021	CBOS	1,154	39	48	13	–9
5–10 Mar 2021	Kantar Public	1,014	30	60	10	–30
29 Jan–3 Feb 2021	Kantar Public	1,011	28	63	9	–35
4–9 Nov 2020	Kantar Public	1,015	28	62	10	–34
6–12 Nov 2020	Kantar Public	1,010	29	62	10	–33
19–29 Oct 2020	CBOS	1,040	36	49	16	–13
2–7 Oct 2020	Kantar Public	1,012	35	54	11	–19

=== Prime Minister Beata Szydło ===
Graphical summary of approval polls

Date(s) conducted	Polling firm/Link	Sample size	Approve	Disapprove	Don't know	Net approval
1–7 Dec 2017	CBOS	925	49	39	12	10
1–6 Dec 2017	Kantar Public	1,059	44	42	14	2
2–12 Nov 2017	CBOS	1,016	49	37	14	12
3–8 Nov 2017	Kantar Public	1,064	48	39	13	9
19–20 Oct 2017	IBRiS / Rz	1,100	45	42		3
5–12 Oct 2017	CBOS	948	53	35	12	18
6–11 Oct 2017	Kantar Public	1,056	48	38	14	10
7–14 Sep 2017	CBOS	985	52	37	11	15
7–8 Sep 2017	IBRiS / Rz	1,100	48.5	49.0	2.5	–0.5
1–6 Sep 2017	Kantar Public	1,060	47	42	11	5
17–24 Aug 2017	CBOS	1,009	46	39	14	7
4–9 Aug 2017	Kantar Public	1,063	46	42	12	4
7–12 Jul 2017	Kantar Public	1,063	46	45	9	1
29 Jun – 6 Jul 2017	CBOS	977	45	39	16	6
1–8 Jun 2017	CBOS	1,020	49	36	14	13
2–7 Jun 2017	Kantar Public	1,055	46	42	12	4
12–17 May 2017	Kantar Public	1,047	45	44	11	1
5–14 May 2017	CBOS	1,034	47	38	15	9
30 Mar – 6 Apr 2017	CBOS	1,075	45	42	13	3
Apr 2017	Kantar Public		48	44	8	4
2–9 Mar 2017	CBOS	1,020	44	42	14	2
3–8 Mar 2017	Kantar Public	1,059	40	47	13	–7
Mar 2017	IBRiS / Rz		33.2	62.3	4.5	–29.1
17–22 Feb 2017	Kantar Public	1,050	44	45	11	–1
2–9 Feb 2017	CBOS	1,016	46	40	14	6
13–18 Jan 2017	Kantar Public	1,063	41	48	11	–7
7–15 Jan 2017	CBOS	1,045	45	42	13	3
1–11 Dec 2016	CBOS	1,136	45	40	15	5
2–7 Dec 2016	Kantar Public	1,051	43	45	12	–2
12–17 Nov 2016	Kantar Public	1,066	44	44	12	Tie
4–13 Nov 2016	CBOS	1,019	44	42	14	2
Nov 2016	IBRiS / Rz		33	41	26	–8
8–19 Oct 2016	CBOS	937	42	41	17	1
7–12 Oct 2016	Kantar Public	1,052	44	45	11	–1
8–15 Sep 2016	CBOS	981	41	42	17	–1
9–14 Sep 2016	Kantar Public	1,059	45	44	11	1
17–25 Aug 2016	CBOS	1,033	44	36	20	8
5–10 Aug 2016	Kantar Public	1,059	46	43	11	3
30 Jun – 7 Jul 2016	CBOS	983	45	37	18	8
1–6 Jul 2016	Kantar Public	1,022	42	46	12	–4
2–9 Jun 2016	CBOS	1,002	41	41	18	Tie
3–8 Jun 2016	Kantar Public	1,027	44	44	12	Tie
13–18 May 2016	Kantar Public	1,009	40	49	11	–9
5–12 May 2016	CBOS	1,100	38	44	18	–6
22–23 Apr 2016	IBRiS / Rz	1,100	37	58	5	–21
8–13 Apr 2016	Kantar Public	1,015	42	44	14	–2
31 Mar – 7 Apr 2016	CBOS	1,104	44	39	17	5
2–9 Mar 2016	CBOS	1,034	44	41	15	3
4–9 Mar 2016	Kantar Public	1,011	44	41	15	3
22–23 Feb 2016	Pollster / "SE.pl"	1,010	31	51	20	–20
5–10 Feb 2016	Kantar Public	1,002	41	42	17	4
3–10 Feb 2016	CBOS	1,000	43	43	14	Tie
15–20 Jan 2016	Kantar Public	1,009	41	42	17	4
7–14 Jan 2016	CBOS	1,063	41	40	19	1
Dec 2015	IBRiS / Onet		34.0	55.5	9.0	–5.4
3–10 Dec 2015	CBOS	989	33	44	23	–11
4–9 Dec 2015	Kantar Public	1,003	41	37	22	4
27–28 Nov 2015	IBRiS / Onet	1,100	39.3	44.7	16.0	–5.4
16 Nov 2015	Formation of the cabinet of Beata Szydło					

== Governmental approval polls ==
=== Law and Justice government ===
Date(s) conducted	Polling firm/Link	Sample size	Approve	Disapprove	Neither	Don't know	Net approval	Notes
27 Nov 2023	Formation of the third cabinet of Mateusz Morawiecki							
3–16 Nov 2023	CBOS	1,072	32	44	21	3	–12	Morawiecki's government
14–27 Aug 2023	CBOS	1,024	34	37	25	4	–3	Morawiecki's government
3–16 Jul 2023	CBOS	1,004	30	47	20	3	–17	Morawiecki's government
8–18 May 2023	CBOS	1,056	30	46	21	3	–16	Morawiecki's government
11–20 Apr 2023	CBOS	1,081	30	42	24	4	–12	
14–19 Apr 2023	Kantar Public	1,015	29	61		10	–32	
17–22 Mar 2023	Kantar Public	981	26	65		9	–39	
9–22 Jan 2023	CBOS	1,028	29	44	24	3	–15	Morawiecki's government
28 Nov–11 Dec 2022	CBOS	1,018	28	46	23	3	–18	Morawiecki's government
2–7 Dec 2022	Kantar Public	970	23	69		8	–46	Morawiecki's government
7–17 Nov 2022	CBOS	1,038	33	44	20	3	–11	
4–9 Nov 2022	Kantar Public	975	24	66		10	–42	
3–13 Oct 2022	CBOS	1,041	32	56		12	–24	PiS government
3–13 Oct 2022	CBOS	1,041	26	47	23	4	–21	Morawiecki's government
14–25 Aug 2022	CBOS	1,043	33	55		11	–22	PiS government
14–25 Aug 2022	CBOS	1,043	29	46	23	3	–17	Morawiecki's government
17–18 Aug 2022	Kantar / TVN	1,003	34	61		5	–27	Morawiecki's government
27–7 Jul 2022	CBOS	1,084	39	49		12	–10	PiS government
27–7 Jul 2022	CBOS	1,084	32	39	25	4	–7	Morawiecki's government
30 May–9 Jun 2022	CBOS	1,050	33	40	23	4	–7	PiS government
30 May–9 Jun 2022	CBOS	1,050	40	49		12	–9	Morawiecki's government
3–8 Jun 2022	Kantar Public	1,012	25	64		11	–39	
2–12 May 2022	CBOS	1,087	34	36	26	4	–2	
8–13 Apr 2022	Kantar Public	1,008	31	58		11	–27	
28 Mar–7 Apr 2022	CBOS	1,030	31	38	28	3	–7	PiS government
28 Mar–7 Apr 2022	CBOS	1,030	40	46		14	–6	Morawiecki's government
28 Feb–10 Mar 2022	CBOS	1,078	33	40	24	3	–7	
11–16 Feb 2022	Kantar Public	1,015	30	61		9	–31	
21–26 Jan 2022	Kantar Public	1,012	25	66		9	–41	
3–13 Jan 2022	CBOS	1,135	30	44	22	4	–14	PiS government
3–13 Jan 2022	CBOS	1,135	34	53		13	–19	Morawiecki's government
29 Nov–12 Dec 2021	CBOS	1,063	30	43	23	3	–13	PiS government
4–14 Nov 2021	CBOS	1,100	29	41	24	6	–12	Morawiecki's government
4–14 Oct 2021	CBOS	1,161	33	38	25	5	–5	
8–12 Oct 2021	Kantar Public	1,002	28	62		10	–34	
6–15 Sep 2021	CBOS	1,218	34	38	24	4	–4	PiS government
6–15 Sep 2021	CBOS	1,218	39	49		12	–10	Morawiecki's government
3–8 Sep 2021	Kantar Public	1,008	32	57		11	–25	
9–14 Jul 2021	Kantar Public	1,004	28	62		10	–34	
7–17 Jun 2021	CBOS	1,218	34	35	27	4	–1	PiS government
7–17 Jun 2021	CBOS	1,218	42	44		14	–2	Morawiecki's government
11–15 Jun 2021	Kantar Public	1,011	32	59		9	–27	
6–16 May 2021	CBOS	1,163	34	40	21	5	–6	PiS government
6–16 May 2021	CBOS	1,163	41	46		13	–5	Morawiecki's government
7–12 May 2021	Kantar Public	1,005	32	57		11	–25	
9–14 Apr 2021	Kantar Public	1,006	28	64		8	–36	
1–11 Mar 2021	CBOS	1,154	32	44	21	3	–12	PiS government
1–11 Mar 2021	CBOS	1,154	39	51		10	–12	Morawiecki's government
5–10 Mar 2021	Kantar Public	1,014	28	62		10	–34	
29 Jan–3 Feb 2021	Kantar Public	1,011	26	65		9	–39	
4–9 Dec 2020	Kantar Public	1,015	26	64		10	–38	
6–12 Nov 2020	Kantar Public	1,010	26	65		9	–39	
19–29 Oct 2020	CBOS	1,040	33	43	20	4	–10	PiS government
19–29 Oct 2020	CBOS	1,040	35	52		12	–17	Morawiecki's government
2–7 Oct 2020	Kantar Public	1,012	34	55		11	–21	
9–16 Jan 2019	CBOS	1,069	41	29	26	4	12	Morawiecki's government
Dec 2019	CBOS		42	29	25	4	13	Morawiecki's government
15 Nov 2019	Formation of the second cabinet of Mateusz Morawiecki							
7–17 Nov 2019	CBOS	951	43	26	28	3	17	Morawiecki's government
9–17 Jan 2018	CBOS	996	42	14	33	11	28	Morawiecki's government
11 Dec 2017	Formation of the first cabinet of Mateusz Morawiecki							
1–7 Dec 2017	CBOS	925	39	30	29	2	9	Szydło's government
2–12 Nov 2017	CBOS	1,016	40	31	27	2	9	Szydło's government
Nov 2017	SW Research / Rz	800	37.9	52.8		9.3	–14.9	Two years of PiS government
5–12 Oct 2017	CBOS	948	44	27	26	2	17	Szydło's government
7–14 Sep 2017	CBOS	985	43	30	24	3	13	Szydło's government
17–24 Aug 2017	CBOS	1,009	41	34	24	2	7	Szydło's government
29 Jun – 6 Jul 2017	CBOS	977	38	31	28	3	7	Szydło's government
Jul 2017	IBRiS / Onet		38	53			–15	Szydło's government
1–8 Jun 2017	CBOS	1,020	42	30	26	3	12	Szydło's government
5–14 May 2017	CBOS	1,034	39	34	25	2	5	Szydło's government
30 Mar – 6 Apr 2017	CBOS	1,075	38	35	25	3	3	Szydło's government
2–9 Mar 2017	CBOS	1,020	36	33	28	3	3	Szydło's government
2–9 Feb 2017	CBOS	1,016	37	33	26	4	4	Szydło's government
7–15 Jan 2017	CBOS	1,045	39	32	26	3	7	Szydło's government
1–11 Dec 2016	CBOS	1,136	37	35	24	3	2	Szydło's government
4–13 Nov 2016	CBOS	1,019	37	32	28	3	4	Szydło's government
8–19 Oct 2016	CBOS	937	36	32	29	3	3	Szydło's government
10–11 Oct 2016	Pollster / "SE.pl"	1,083	25	47			–22	Szydło's government
8–15 Sep 2016	CBOS	981	34	33	28	5	1	Szydło's government
17–25 Aug 2016	CBOS	1,033	37	32	29	2	5	Szydło's government
30 Jun – 7 Jul 2016	CBOS	983	37	30	29	4	7	Szydło's government
2–9 Jun 2016	CBOS	1,002	36	32	29	3	4	Szydło's government
5–12 May 2016	CBOS	1,100	32	35	29	4	–3	Szydło's government
31 Mar – 7 Apr 2016	CBOS	1,104	38	31	28	3	7	Szydło's government
2–9 Mar 2016	CBOS	1,034	36	33	27	4	3	Szydło's government
3–10 Feb 2016	CBOS	1,000	35	32	27	6	3	Szydło's government
7–14 Jan 2016	CBOS	1,063	36	31	28	5	5	Szydło's government
3–10 Dec 2015	CBOS	989	30	34	30	6	–4	Szydło's government
4–9 Dec 2015	Kantar Public	1,003	36	49		15	–13	Szydło's government
16 Nov 2015	Formation of the cabinet of Beata Szydło							

== Other polls ==
=== Government actions regarding environmental disaster on Oder River ===
Date(s) conducted	Polling firm/Link	Sample size	Question wording	Approve	Disapprove	Don't know	Net approval
27–28 Aug 2022	United Surveys / WP.pl	1,000	How do you assess the actions of the government and its subordinate institutions regarding the ecological disaster on the Odra River?	26.7	64.9	8.4	–38.2
17–18 Aug 2022	Kantar / TVN	1,003	How do you assess the actions of the government of Prime Minister Mateusz Morawiecki in terms of controlling the ecological disaster on the Odra River?	20	68	12	–48
16–17 Aug 2022	SW Research / rp.pl	800	How do you assess the actions of the government regarding the ecological disaster on the Odra River?	24.4	60.5	15.1	–36.1

=== Government actions regarding Russian invasion of Ukraine ===
Date(s) conducted	Polling firm/Link	Sample size	Question wording	Approve	Disapprove	Neither	Don't know	Net approval
3–5 Feb 2023	United Surveys / WP.pl	1,000	How do you assess the policies and actions of the PiS government on the international arena regarding support for Ukraine and helping them achieve victory in the war with Russia?	80.4	11.1		8.5	69.3
1–2 Apr 2022	IBRiS / "Rz"	1,000	How do you assess the actions of the Polish government on the international stage in relation to the war in Ukraine?	64.9	29.6		5.5	35.3
18 Mar 2022	United Surveys / WP.pl	1,000	Are the actions the Polish government is taking regarding Russia's invasion of Ukraine appropriate and sufficient?	68.1	28.4		3.6	39.7
15–16 Mar 2022	SW Research / rp.pl	800	How do you assess the actions of the Polish government regarding the war in Ukraine (diplomatic actions, helping refugees, etc.)?	52.2	17.8	24.3	5.7	34.4

=== Government preparation and dealing with COVID-19 pandemic ===
Date(s) conducted	Polling firm/Link	Sample size	Question wording	Yes	No	Neither	Don't know	Net approval
21–22 Jan 2022	IBRiS / "Rz"	1,100	Has government prepared Poland and Poles well for the fiifth wave of the coronavirus epidemic?	26.7	66.2		7.1	–39.5
17–18 Dec 2021	IBRiS / "Rz"	1,100	Is the government in control of the coronavirus epidemic in Poland?	35.7	55.4		8.9	–19.7
11–12 Dec 2021	Kantar / TVN	1,000	Is the government in control of the coronavirus epidemic in Poland?	34	60		6	–26
27–28 Apr 2021	Kantar / TVN	1,001	Has the Polish government done everything to prevent Poles from dying in such large numbers as a result of the pandemic?	29	59		12	–30
30–31 Mar 2021	SW Research / RP.pl	800	Is the government in control of the coronavirus epidemic in Poland?	14.5	52.1	27	6.4	–37.6
Mid Oct 2020	RMF24 & DGP	N/A	Has government prepared Poland and health service for the second wave of the coronavirus epidemic?	26.4	67.9		5.7	–41.5
Mid Oct 2020	RMF24 & DGP	N/A	Is the government in control of the coronavirus epidemic in Poland?	32.5	60		7.5	–27.5
Oct 2020	SW Research / RP.pl	N/A	Has government prepared Poland and Poles well for the second wave of the coronavirus epidemic?	18	59.9		23.30	–41.9

== See also ==
- 2015 Polish parliamentary election
- 2019 Polish parliamentary election
