= Marian Banaś =

Polish government official, finance minister, president of the Supreme Audit Office

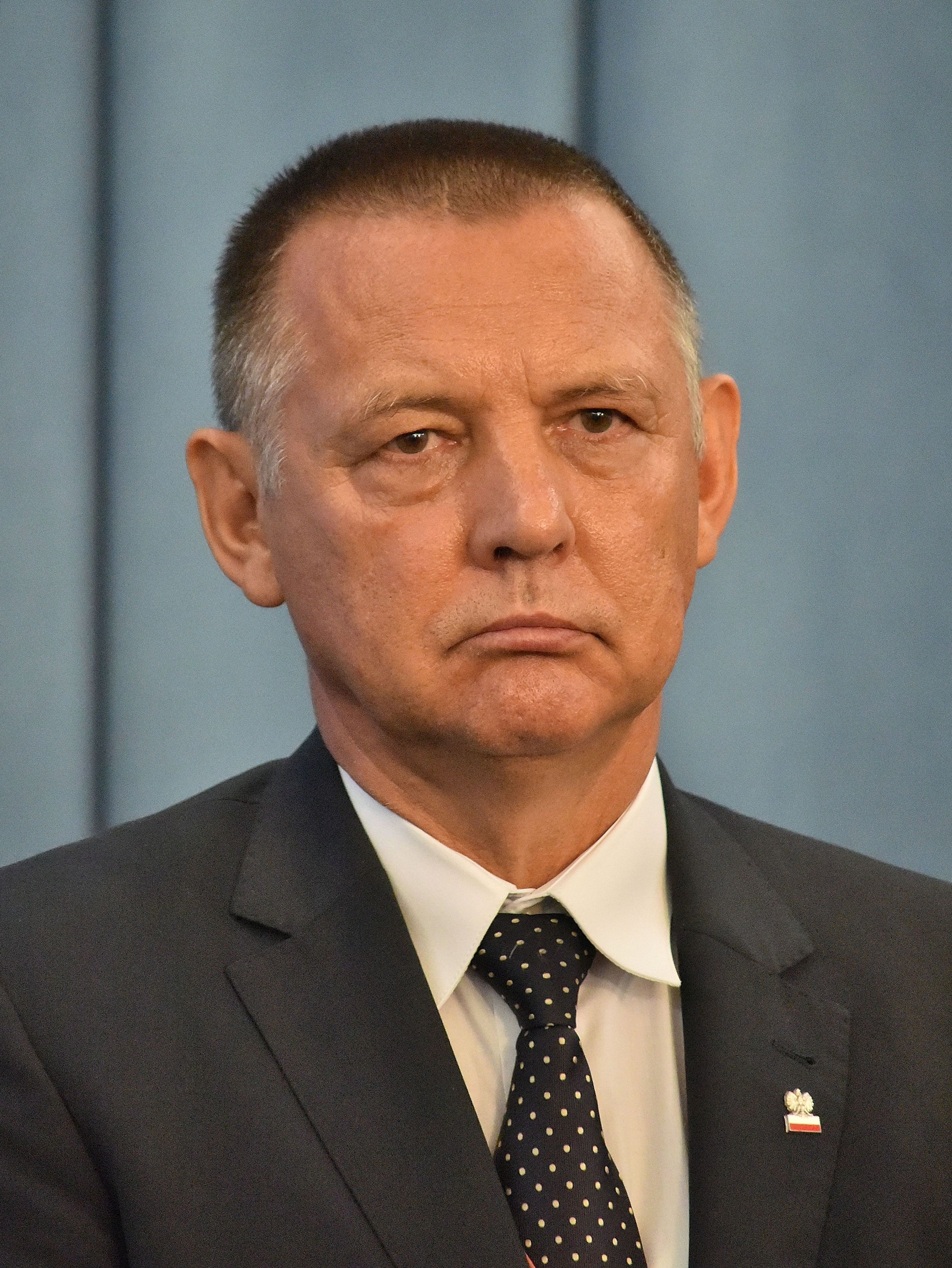

President of the Supreme Audit Office
- In office 30 August 2019 – 24 September 2025
- President: Andrzej Duda; Karol Nawrocki
- Prime Minister: Mateusz Morawiecki; Donald Tusk
- Preceded by: Krzysztof Kwiatkowski
- Succeeded by: Mariusz Haładyj

Minister of Finance
- In office 4 June 2019 – 30 August 2019
- Prime Minister: Mateusz Morawiecki
- Preceded by: Teresa Czerwińska
- Succeeded by: Mateusz Morawiecki

Chief Executive of the Customs Service
- In office 19 November 2015 – 28 February 2017
- Preceded by: Jacek Kapica
- Succeeded by: Vacant
- In office 28 November 2005 – 2 January 2008
- Preceded by: Wiesław Czyżowicz
- Succeeded by: Jacek Dominik

Personal details
- Born: Marian Banaś; 13 July 1955 (age 71) Piekielnik, Poland
- Party: Law and Justice (2019)
- Education: Jagiellonian University
- Awards: Order of Polonia Restituta Cross of Merit (Poland)
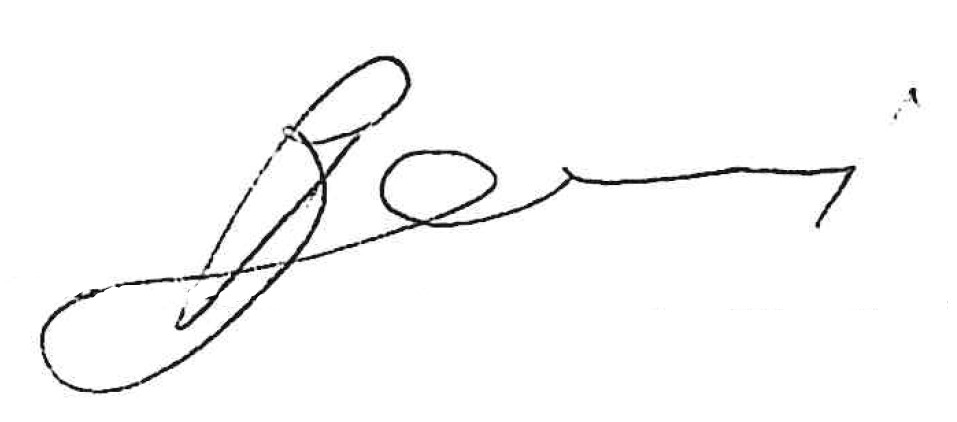
- Signature

Marian Banaś (born 13 July 1955 in Piekielnik) is a Polish politician and civil servant. He served twice as Chief Executive of the Customs Service from 2005 to 2008 and 2015 to 2017. He briefly served in politics as the Minister of Finance for the First Cabinet of Mateusz Morawiecki from 4 June to 30 August 2019. From 2019-2025 He served as the President of the Supreme Audit Office, one of the oldest state institutions in Poland.

== Personal life ==
=== Education ===
In 1979 Banaś graduated from the Faculty of Law and Administration of the Jagiellonian University. He also studied philosophy at the Pontifical University of John Paul II.
