= Teresa Czerwińska =

Polish economist (born 1974)

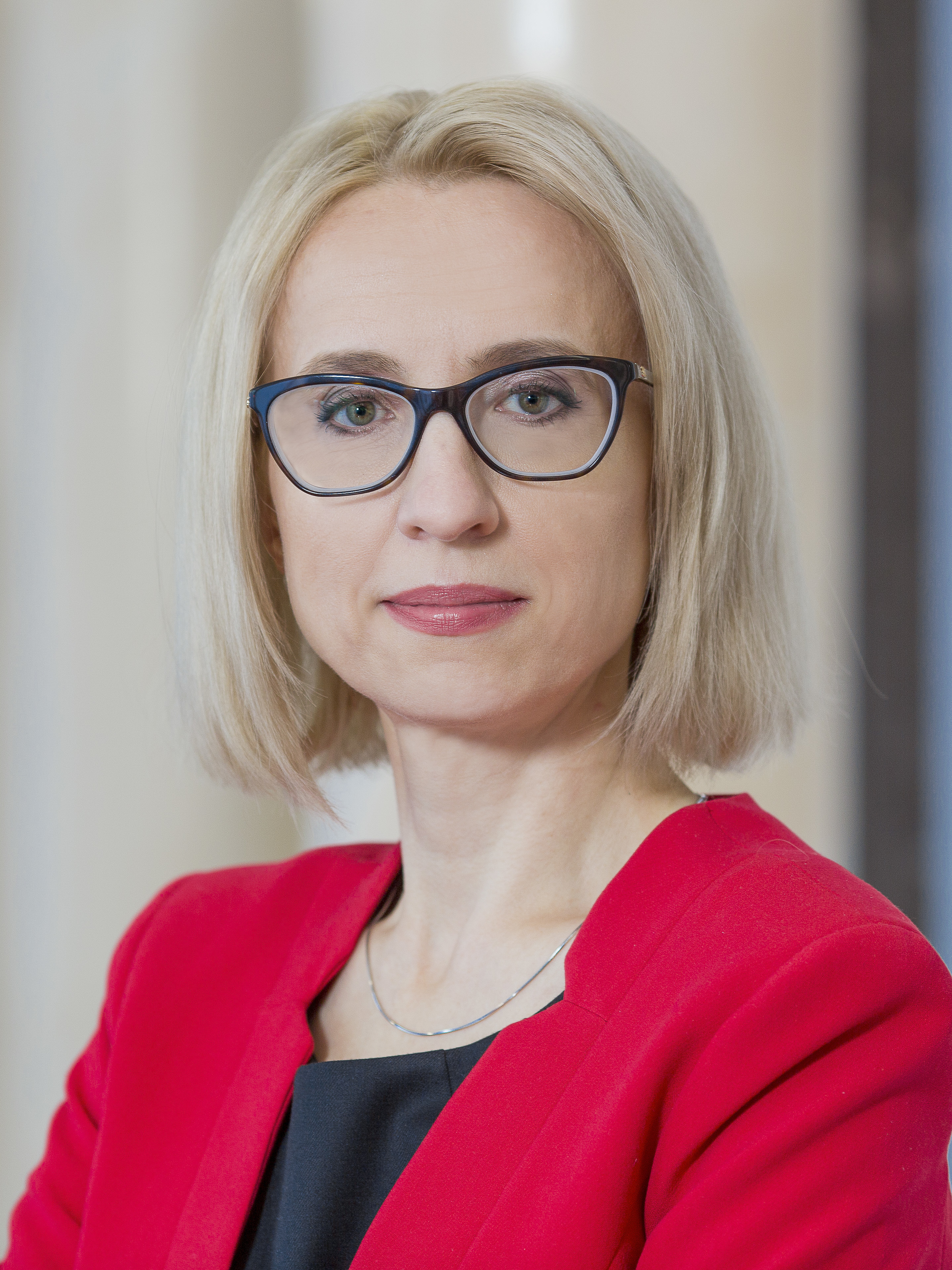
- Czerwińska in 2017

Vice-President of the European Investment Bank
- In office 1 March 2020 – 1 March 2026
- President: Werner Hoyer; Nadia Calviño
- Preceded by: Vazil Hudák
- Succeeded by: Marko Primorac

Minister of Finance
- In office 9 January 2018 – 4 June 2019
- Prime Minister: Mateusz Morawiecki
- Preceded by: Mateusz Morawiecki
- Succeeded by: Marian Banaś

Personal details
- Born: 7 September 1974 (age 51) Daugavpils, Soviet Union (now Latvia)
- Party: Law and Justice
- Education: University of Gdańsk

Teresa Czerwińska (born 7 September 1974) is a Polish economist originally from Latvia. Since 2020, she has served as a vice president of the European Investment Bank.

== Early life and education ==
Czerwińska was born in Daugavplis, Latvian Soviet Socialist Republic. She is the daughter of two Latvian Poles — Bronisław and Ludmiła Tumanowski. As a child, she was active within the Association of Poles, where she served as a scout. She was awarded a scholarship for being a part of the Polish diaspora, which inspired her to leave Daugavplis in order to begin her studies in Poland.

Czerwińska graduated from the University of Gdańsk in 1997 with undergraduate degrees in Social Sciences and management. She began her doctoral dissertation on the investment activity of insurance companies and their effects on the capital market in Poland, which she successfully defended her in 2000.

Czerwińska earned her PhD in economics from the University of Gdańsk. She served as an associate professor at the University of Gdańsk and then at the University of Warsaw. She is a specialist in the field of risk management within financial institutions and markets.

== Career ==
In 2011, Czerwińska was offered a position as an associate professor within the Department of Financial Systems of Economics and within the Department of Management. Between 2015-2018, she was the secretary in the Polish Academy of Sciences for the Committee on Financial Sciences.

In 2015, she became the Undersecretary of the State in the Ministry of Science and Higher Education. Within her role, Czerwińska was responsible for many areas within the department. She helped with the development and implementation of a new mechanism that uses algorithms to allocate budget subsidies for public universities. This improved the efficiency of how funds were spent and the implementation of quality solutions for financing universities. Then, in 2017, Czerwińska was appointed Undersecretary of the State in the Ministry of Finance, where she was responsible for the preparation and implementation of state budget, and also handling funds from the European Union.

In 2018, Prime Minister Mateusz Morawiecki appointed Czerwińska to be the minister of finance. Until her appointment, Morawiecki had occupied that role in conjunction with being the Prime Minister.

In March 2019, daily newspaper Puls Biznesu reported that Czerwińska was considering stepping down over plans by the PiS party to increase spending by up to $10 billion, focusing on child subsidies, state pensions and transport infrastructure as part of its campaign for parliamentary elections; a government spokesperson later said that Czerwińska had in fact not submitted her resignation. Shortly after, she was replaced with her deputy Marian Banaś as part of a cabinet reshuffle.

From 2019 to 2020, Czerwińska served as a member of the Management Board of the National Bank of Poland.

=== European Investment Bank, 2020–present ===
Czerwińska has been serving as a Vice President of the European Investment Bank (EIB) in 2020. At the EIB, she has worked on several portfolios including affordable housing, addressing climate change, and aid to Ukraine.

In 2023, the government of Prime Minister Mateusz Morawiecki nominated Czerwińska as Poland's candidate to succeed Werner Hoyer as president of the EIB; however, the position ultimately went to Nadia Calviño.

== Other activities ==
- European Bank for Reconstruction and Development (EBRD), Ex-Officio Alternate Member of the Board of Governors

== Publications ==
Czerwińska has co-authored numerous scientific publications and academic textbooks on macroeconomics, insurance, and investment management. She has analyzed expert opinions in the field of financial management, the risks within financial institutions, and socially responsible investing.

Selected publications:

- Rynek kapitałowy – regulacje i fundamenty (współredaktor), 2018,
- Ryzyko instytucji finansowych. Współczesne trendy i wyzwania (współautor), 2016,
- Rynek kapitałowy – efektywność i ryzyko (współredaktor), 2016,
- Ubezpieczenia (współautor), 2016,
- Makroekonomia (podręcznik akademicki, współautor) 2015,
- Inwestowanie na rynku kapitałowym: rynek po kryzysie (współredaktor), 2015,
- Rynek kapitałowy wobec wyzwań dekoniunktury (współautor), 2014,
- Polityka inwestycyjna instytucji ubezpieczeniowych. Istota – uwarunkowania – instrumenty, 2009,
- Towarzystwa ubezpieczeniowe na rynku kapitałowym w Polsce, 2003.

Political offices
Preceded by Mateusz Morawiecki	Minister of Finance; 2018–2019	Succeeded by Marian Banaś
