= Ministry of Entrepreneurship and Technology =

Government ministry of Poland

- Ministerstwo Przedsiębiorczości i Technologii
- Official governmental wall plaque

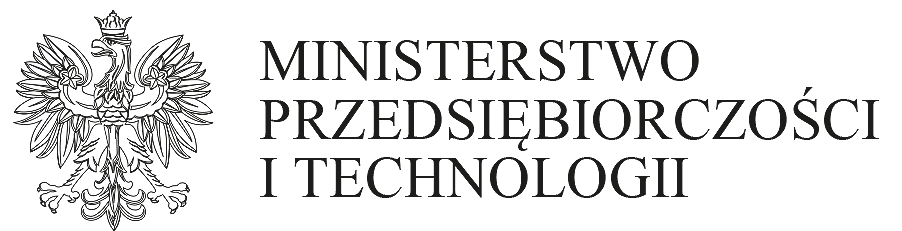
- Ministerial Logotype

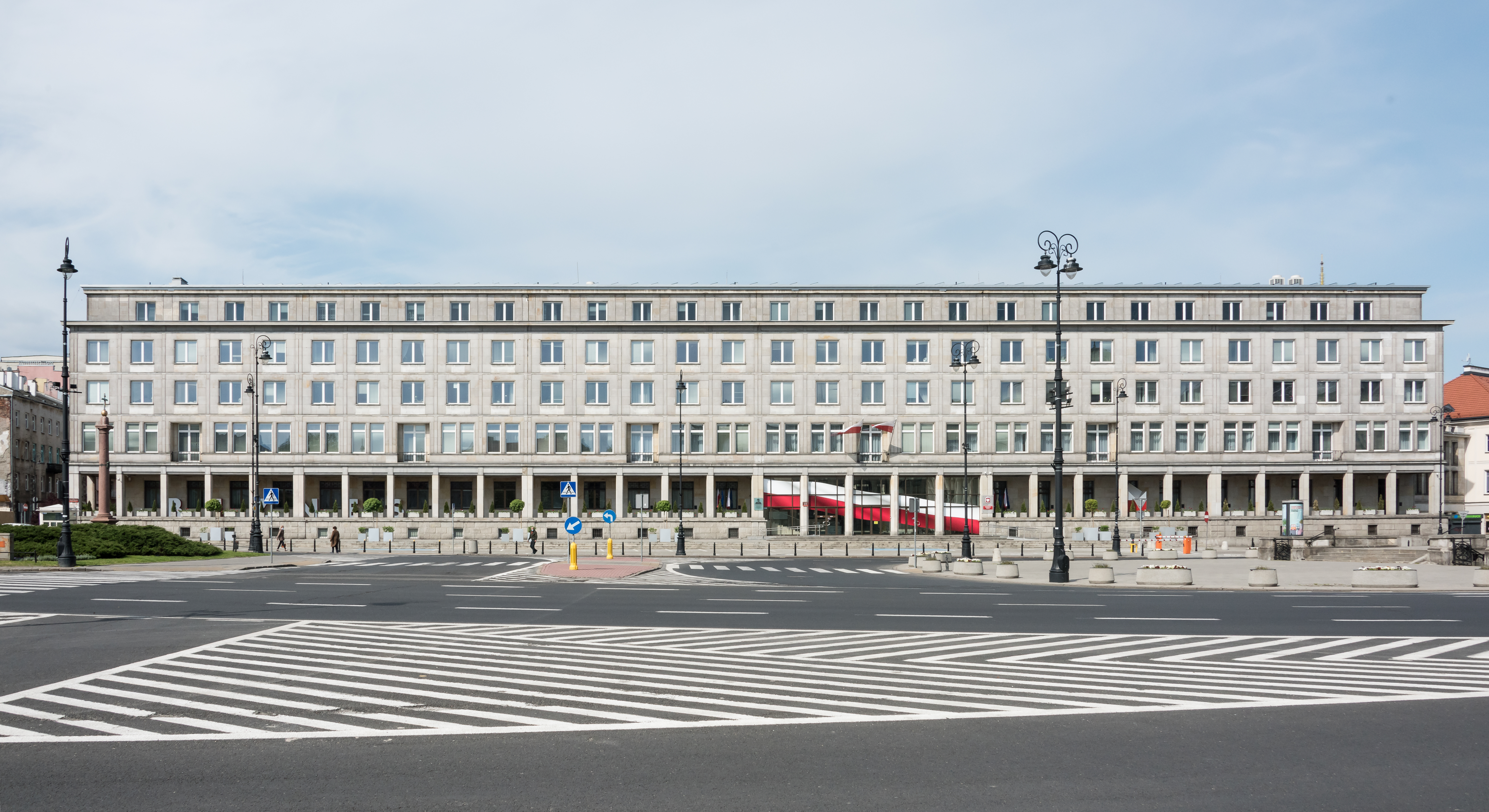

Agency overview
- Formed: 9 January 2018
- Preceding agency: Ministry of Development
- Jurisdiction: Poland
- Headquarters: Warsaw
- Parent agency: Council of Ministers
- Website: www.gov.pl

Ministry of Entrepreneurship and Technology is a Polish government administration office.

The Ministry was established on 12 January 2018 (with effect from 9 January 2018) after separating from the existing Ministry of Development.

== Ministers ==
Portrait	Name	Party	Term of office		Prime Minister (cabinet)
	Jadwiga Emilewicz	Agreement	9 January 2018	15 November 2019	Mateusz Morawiecki (Morawiecki)
