= Tax and Customs Service (Poland) =

Tax and Customs Service Służba Celno-Skarbowa
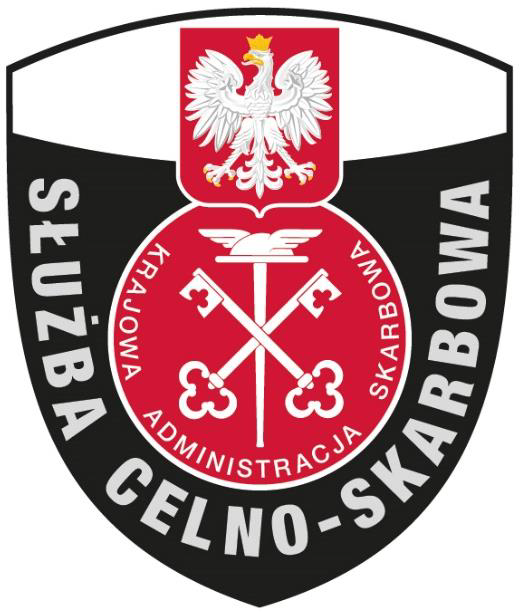
- uniform patch
- Abbreviation: SCS

Agency overview
- Formed: 2017; 9 years ago
- Preceding agencies: Centralny Zarząd Ceł; Główny Urząd Ceł; Służba Celna

Jurisdictional structure
- Operations jurisdiction: Poland
- Specialist jurisdictions: Customs, excise, gambling; Taxation

Operational structure
- Headquarters: Warsaw
- Elected officers responsible: Andrzej Domański, Minister of Finance; Marcin Łoboda, Secretary of State at the Ministry of Finance and Head of the National Revenue Administration
- Parent agency: National Revenue Administration

Website
- puesc.gov.pl

Tax and Customs Service (Polish: Służba Celno-Skarbowa) is the customs service of the Republic of Poland and is the uniformed and armed law enforcement agency component operating with own tactical units, within the National Revenue Administration (Krajowa Administracja Skarbowa; KAS) subordinate to the Polish Ministry of Finance. In its current form, it was established in 2017 by merging the Polish Customs Service, created in 1999 from the reformed Central Customs Office (Główny Urząd Ceł) until 1953 known as Central Board of Customs (Centralny Zarząd Ceł), with the fiscal control (and intelligence) service, and incorporating it together with the tax administration into the newly established KAS umbrella structure. It is responsible for assessing and collecting customs duties and excise, exercising customs control, primarily at Poland's borders, the entire tax intelligence, targeted fiscal inspections, supervision of legal and combatting illegal gambling, as well as exercising tasks related to tax, customs and illegal gambling investigations (directed by a public prosecutor) in criminal cases, including tactical operations.

== Central Board of Customs executives ==
- 1 January 1946 – 30 September 1947 Kazimierz Siewierski
- 1 October 1947 – 30 June 1952 Zygmunt Czyżewski
- 1 July 1952 – 15 December 1953 Witold Tryuk (acting)

== Central Customs Office executives ==
- 16 December 1953 – 31 August 1969 Józef Konarzewski
- 1 September 1969 – 31 January 1972 Tomasz Antoniewicz
- 1 February 1972 – 15 November 1977 Jarosław Nowicki
- 16 November 1977 – 29 February 1980 Eugeniusz Dostojewski
- 1 March 1980 – 30 April 1985 Kazimierz Prośniak
- 15 August 1985 – 31 January 1990 Jerzy Ćwiek
- 1 February 1990 – 21 February 1991 Tomasz Bartoszewicz
- 22 February 1991 – 24 March 1991 Krzysztof Hordyński (acting)
- 25 March 1991 – 20 August 1993 Mirosław Zieliński
- 23 August 1993 – 11 December 1993 Mariusz Jakubowski (acting)
- 11 December 1993 – 16 March 1995 Ireneusz Sekuła
- 16 March 1995 – 29 June 1995 Lech Kacperski (acting)
- 30 June 1995 – 30 June 1997 Mieczysław Nogaj
- 30 June 1997 – 7 January 1998 Tomasz Cecelski (acting)
- 7 January 1998 – 12 May 1999 Janusz Paczocha
- 13 May 1999 – 5 December 2001 Zbigniew Bujak
- 5 December 2001 – 30 April 2002 Tomasz Michalak

== Customs Service executives ==
- 1 May 2002 – 17 January 2003 Tomasz Michalak
- 17 January 2003 – 23 February 2004 Robert Kwaśniak
- 24 February 2004 – 28 November 2005 Wiesław Czyżowicz
- 28 November 2005 – 2 January 2008 Marian Banaś
- 3 January 2008 – 1 February 2008 Jacek Dominik
- 1 February 2008 – 19 November 2015 Jacek Kapica
- 19 November 2015 – 28 February 2017 Marian Banaś

== National Revenue Administration executives ==
- 1 March 2017 – 4 June 2019 Marian Banaś
- 4 June 2019 – 12 June 2019 Paweł Cybulski (acting)
- 12 June 2019 – 2 March 2020 Piotr Walczak
- 3 March 2020 – 26 April 2022 Magdalena Rzeczkowska
- 12 May 2022 – present Bartosz Zbaraszczuk

== Ranks and rank insignia ==
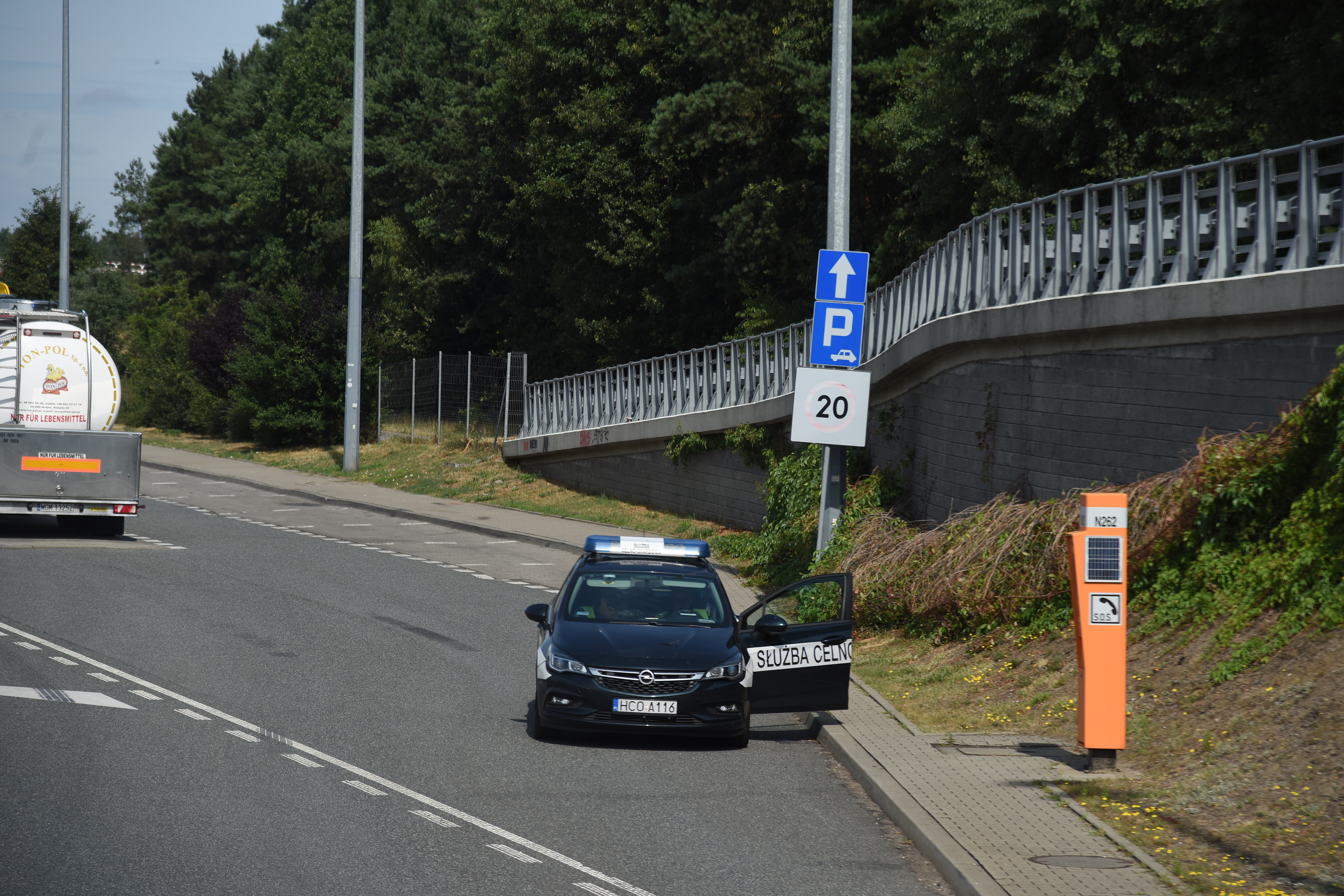
Opel Astra patrol unit of the Polish Customs

The Polish government decided in 2009 that the customs service rank structure would be adapted to the rank structure of the Police and Border Guard.

	korpus generałów		korpus oficerów starszych			korpus oficerów młodszych
Polish Tax and Customs Service
Polish Tax and Customs Service	generał	nadinspektor	inspektor	młodszy inspektor	podinspektor	nadkomisarz	komisarz	podkomisarz

	korpus aspirantów			korpus podoficerów						korpus szeregowych
Polish Tax and Customs Service
Polish Tax and Customs Service	starszy aspirant	aspirant	młodszy aspirant	starszy rachmistrz	rachmistrz	młodszy rachmistrz	starszy rewident	rewident	młodszy rewident	starszy aplikant;	aplikant
