= Supreme Audit Office (Poland) =

Supreme audit institution of Poland

- Najwyższa Izba Kontroli (Polish)
- Monogram of the Supreme Audit Office

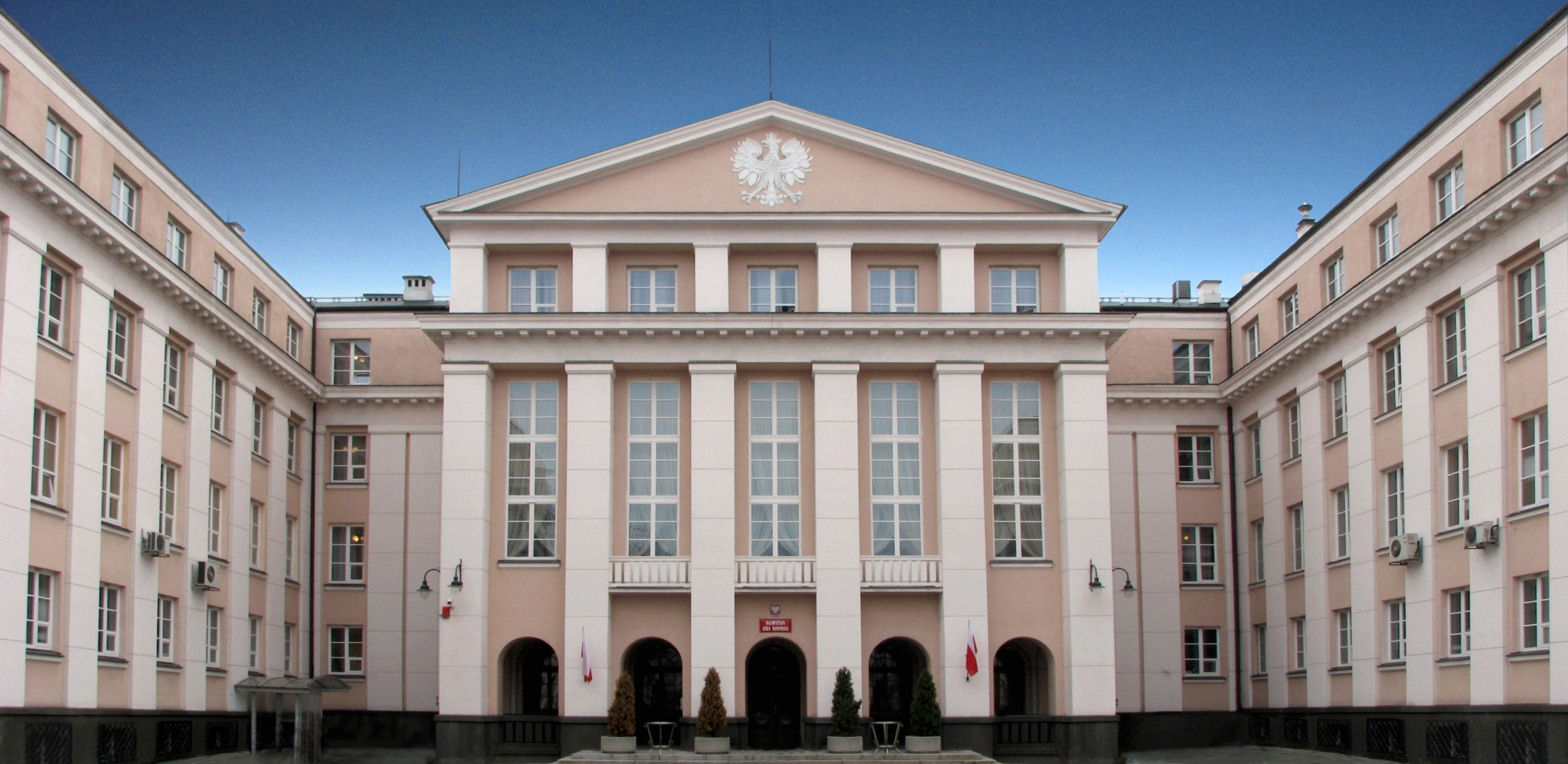
- Seat of the Supreme Audit Office

Agency overview
- Formed: 8 February 1919
- Jurisdiction: Government of Poland
- Headquarters: Filtrowa 57, Warsaw; 52.2184°N 20.9990°E
- Agency executive: Mariusz Haładyj, President
- Website: www.nik.gov.pl

The Supreme Audit Office (Polish: Najwyższa Izba Kontroli, NIK) is the supreme audit institution of Poland, responsible for auditing the finances and the performace of the government and other publicly funded entities. A constitutional body, it operates according to the principles of independence from the executive branch, autonomy of its auditors, and collegial governance. The office is accountable and provides reports to the Sejm, the lower house of the Polish parliament. The President of the Supreme Audit Office is appointed by the Sejm with the approval of the Senate for a six-year term, renewable once. The incumbent has been Mariusz Haładyj since September 2025.

Regarded as one of Poland's oldest extant government institutions, it was established in the Second Polish Republic on 8 February 1919 as the Supreme State Audit Office, by decree of Chief of State Józef Piłsudski, three months after Poland regained independence in November 1918. It was reinstated under its current name by the March Constitution of 1921 and continued to exist, albeit with interruptions, during the World War II and the Polish People's Republic. In its present form, the institution operates under the Supreme Audit Office Act of 1994 and the 1997 Constitution of Poland.

== History ==
The Supreme Audit Office was created on the initiative of the Head of State, Józef Piłsudski. Its organisation and functioning are set out in the Constitution of the Republic of Poland and the NIK Act of 23 December 1994. The NIK is subordinate to the Sejm (lower house of the Polish Parliament) and it acts in accordance with the principle of collegial responsibility. The NIK is headed by the President who is appointed by the Sejm for a six-year term of office. The NIK performs audits related to, primarily, the execution of the state budget as well as public finance spending and management of public property by state and local governmental bodies and economic entities. Every year, the NIK submits three key documents to the Sejm: the analysis of the state budget execution and monetary policy guidelines, the opinion on the vote of discharge for the Council of Ministers and the annual report on the NIK's activity.

From its very first day, NIK has been the country's supreme audit institution, empowered to exercise wide-ranging audit of the revenue and expenditure of the state and all institutions and corporations that make use of public funds. NIK is entitled to audit all state institutions, government and local government administrative units, together with those corporate bodies and non-governmental organisations which perform public contracts or receive government grants and guarantees.

The Constitution of the Republic of Poland, and the statute relating to the NIK, determine that the Polish SAI functions on the principle of collegiate responsibility. The Speaker of the Parliament appoints members of the college for a three-year tenure. The tasks of the college include the approval of the analysis of the state budget execution and the principles of fiscal policy, the audit of the NIK's performance, formulating an opinion concerning certification of performance of duties part of discharge procedure of the government, the work plan and the draft budget for the NIK. The college assesses audit programmes and the outcomes of particularly important audits. It also considers post audit objections.

Under the current regulations, NIK is answerable to the Sejm, which appoints its president for a 6-year term, with the approval of the Senate. Terms of office of the President of the NIK do not necessarily coincide with those of the Parliament, which in practice prevents this office from being dependent on any political party. Like members of the Sejm, the President of NIK also enjoys immunity: he cannot be arrested or indicted without the consent of the Sejm. Currently, the post of the President of the NIK is held by Mariusz Haładyj, appointed on 17 September 2025.

NIK institutes audit proceedings on its own initiative, at the request of Sejm or its bodies or representatives (e.g. the Speaker of Sejm), the President of the Republic, or the Prime Minister. Special types of NIK activities include audits of the state budget execution and of the principles of monetary policy, as well as the NIK opinion in votes of confidence for the Council of Ministers.

In October 2025, the NIK College approved the institution's first major organisational charter change in fourteen years. The reorganisation, implemented from 1 January 2026, consolidated audit work into larger units and provided for an ethics committee; NIK stated that it would be carried out without increasing its staffing or budget.

The NIK fulfils its tasks based on periodic work plans. In the first instance, the audit of the state budget execution is completed, as the NIK is legally bound to conduct this activity. NIK undertakes other audits according to prioritised directions established by the NIK College for a period of three years. The NIK establishes whether the state fulfils its obligations towards its citizens, as well as indicates areas in which there are concerns, in particular ones that could be hindering proper development. Each year new audit areas are selected according to which specific themes for planned audits are programmed. NIK can also undertake ad hoc audits.

The Supreme Audit Office cooperates with similar bodies in the European Union countries, with the European Court of Auditors, International Board of Auditors for NATO, as well as the auditing authorities in other countries of Central and Eastern Europe such as the Czech Republic, Slovakia, Russia, and Hungary.

The Supreme Audit Office also cooperates with its European partners within the framework of EUROSAI - the European Organisation of Supreme Audit Institutions, which is one of seven regional groups of INTOSAI - the International Organisation of Supreme Audit Institutions. Jacek Jezierski, President of the NIK was the Chair of EUROSAI Governing Board in 2008–2011.

== President of the NIK ==
l.p	Image	Name	from	To
1.		Tadeusz Hupałowski	29 December 1989	15 May 1991
2.		Walerian Pańko	23 May 1991	7 October 1991
3.		Lech Kaczyński	14 February 1992	8 June 1995
4.		Janusz Wojciechowski	22 June 1995	20 July 2001
5.		Mirosław Sekuła	20 July 2001	22 July 2007
6.		Jacek Jezierski	22 August 2007	22 August 2013
7.		Krzysztof Kwiatkowski	27 August 2013	30 August 2019
8.		Marian Banaś	30 August 2019	24 September 2025
9.		Mariusz Haładyj	24 September 2025	Present

== See also ==
- Supreme audit institution
