= Mariusz Haładyj =

Polish official (born 1978))

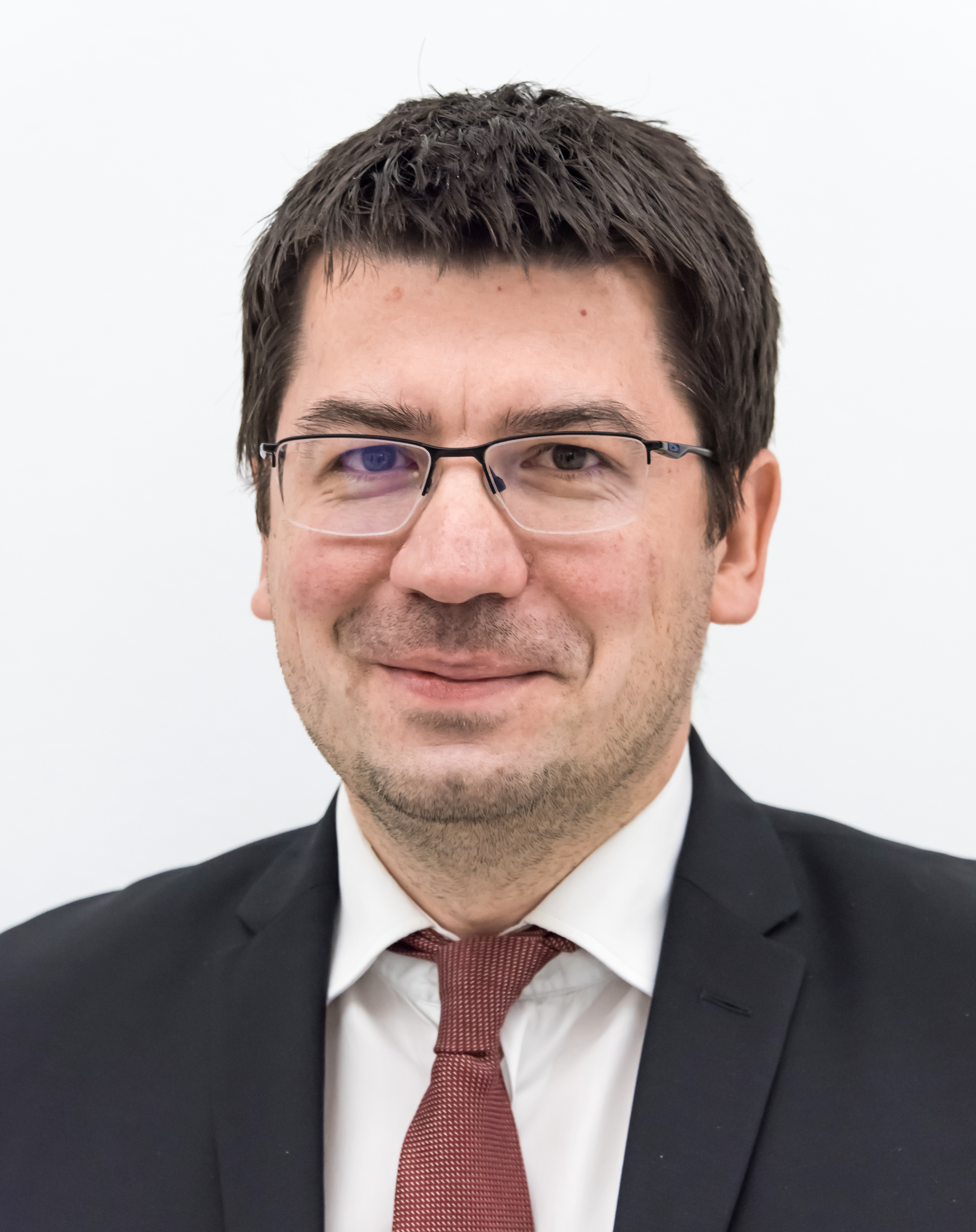
- Mariusz Haładyj, 2020
- Born: 28 August 1978 (age 48); Krasnystaw
- Education: Catholic University of Lublin

Mariusz Haładyj (born 28 August 1978) is a president of the Supreme Audit Office of Poland.

== Biography ==
The son of Roman. He graduated from the Faculty of Law at the Catholic University of Lublin. He completed postgraduate studies in corporate law at the University of Warsaw.

On 1 February 2012 he was appointed undersecretary of state at the Ministry of Economy. On 16 January 2018 he was appointed undersecretary of state at the Ministry of Entrepreneurship and Technology. From 2018 to 2019 he was a member of Polish Financial Supervision Authority. From 2019 to 2025 he was president of The General Counsel to the Republic of Poland. On 12 September 2025 he was appointed president of the Supreme Audit Office of Poland.

Mariusz Haładyj is married and has three children.
