= Jadwiga Emilewicz =

Polish politician and political scientist

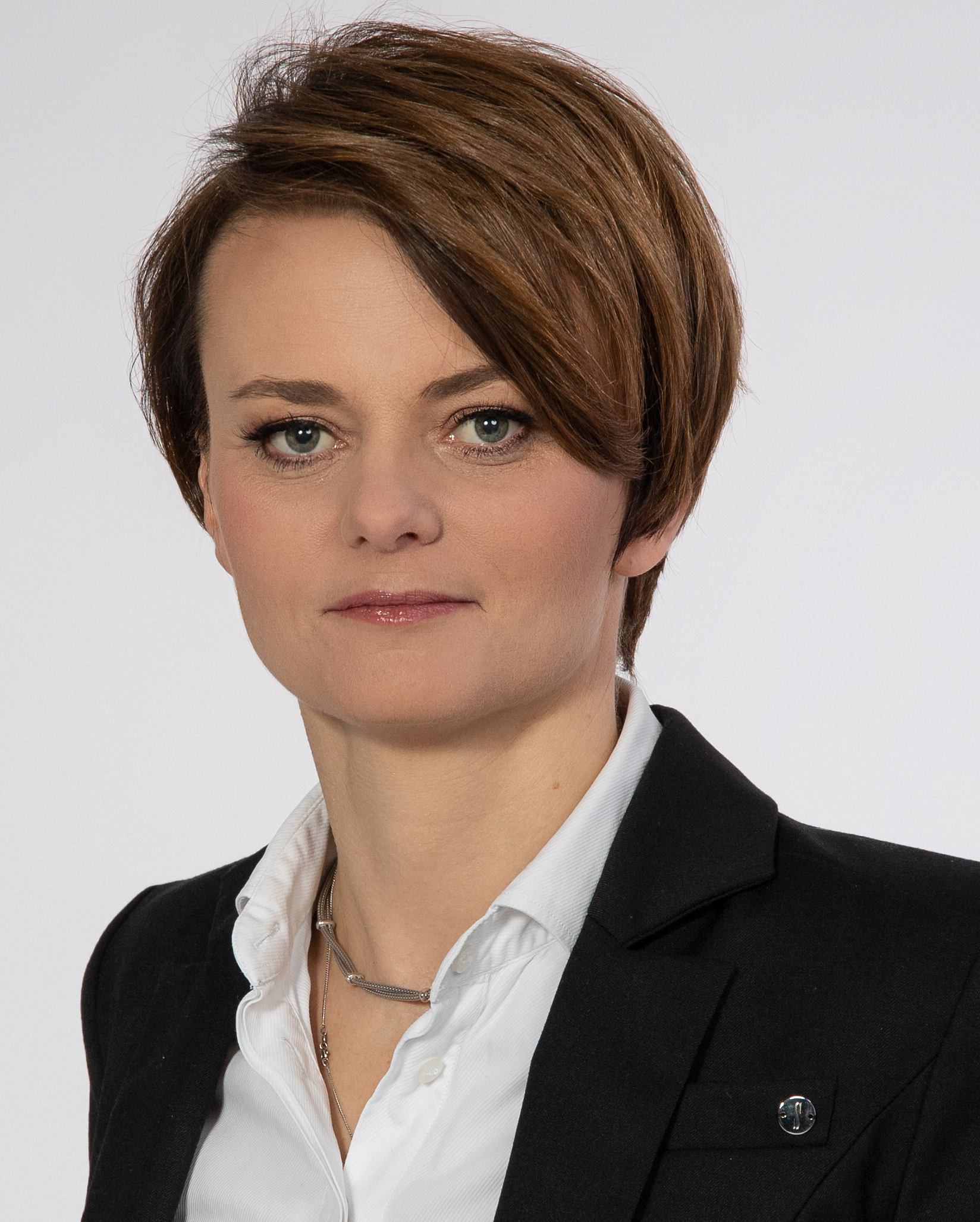
- Official portrait, 2019

Deputy Prime Minister of Poland
- In office 9 April 2020 – 6 October 2020
- President: Andrzej Duda
- Prime Minister: Mateusz Morawiecki
- Preceded by: Jarosław Gowin
- Succeeded by: Jarosław Gowin; Jarosław Kaczyński

Minister of Development
- In office 15 November 2019 – 6 October 2020
- President: Andrzej Duda
- Prime Minister: Mateusz Morawiecki
- Preceded by: Position established
- Succeeded by: Jarosław Gowin (As Minister of Development, Labour and Technology)

Minister of Entrepreneurship and Technology
- In office 9 January 2018 – 15 November 2019
- President: Andrzej Duda
- Prime Minister: Mateusz Morawiecki
- Preceded by: Mateusz Morawiecki
- Succeeded by: Position abolished

Personal details
- Born: Jadwiga Katarzyna Szyler; 27 August 1974 (age 52) Kraków, Poland
- Party: Agreement (2017–2020)
- Education: Jagiellonian University

Jadwiga Katarzyna Emilewicz (born 27 August 1974) is a Polish politician and political scientist. In 2020, she was Deputy Prime Minister of Poland. In 2019, she became Minister of Development, upon her three-year service as an undersecretary of state in the Ministry of Development, and from 2018 to 2019, she was Minister of Entrepreneurship and Technology in the government of Mateusz Morawiecki.

== Biography ==
Emilewicz was born in Kraków in 1974 to Antoni and Zdzisława Szyler.

Emilewicz studied political science at the Jagiellonian University in Kraków, graduating in 1998. She began a collaboration with the Center for Political Thought in 1995. During the late 1990s, she joined the Klub Jagielloński association, where she organised discussions involving Lech Kaczyński, Ludwik Dorn and Jan Rokita, and met Jarosław Gowin, the editor-in-chief of the monthly Znak, who became her political mentor. She also became an active member of Opus Dei.

In 1997, she completed a journalist's internship under Robert Mazurek at the conservative daily Życie, edited by Tomasz Wołek. She held a counsellor's appointment in the Department of Foreign Affairs of the Prime Minister Jerzy Buzek's Chancellery from 1998 to 2002. In 2002, she published Reformers and Politicians: The Power Play for the 1998 Reform of Public Administration in Poland, as Seen by Its Main Players, jointly with Artur Wołek. She obtained a postgraduate diploma from Wadham College, Oxford in the same year.

On 27 November 2015, Emilewicz was appointed undersecretary of state in the Ministry of Development and held the function until 2018, when she became the head of the Ministry of Entrepreneurship and Technology in the government of Mateusz Morawiecki. Emilewicz retained the office during its reorganization into Ministry of Development upon the following election in 2019 and thus entered Morawiecki's second cabinet. Meanwhile, in 2017, she was one of the founders of the Agreement, a party of which she shortly became a Vice Leader.

In 2020, Emilewicz was sworn in as Deputy Prime Minister of Poland, simultaneously maintaining her so-far ministerial office, following Jarosław Gowin stepping down as Deputy Prime Minister and her candidature being proposed by Gowin's Agreement party instead.

In 2026 she was no longer a minister. She was on the board of the Polish think tank, the Sobieski Institute.

== Publications ==
- Reformers and politicians. The game for political reform in 1998 seen through the eyes of its actors, Nowy Sącz 2002 (together with Artur Wołek).
- European Eastern Policy. Challenge of Poles and Germans, Krakow 2008 (editor of collective work).
- College of Diplomacy, "New Europe" 2007, No. 1 (5).
- Citizenship Lesson, "Znak" 2003, No. 579.
