= Ministry of Development (Poland) =

Former government ministry of Poland

- Ministerstwo Rozwoju
- Official governmental wall plaque

- Ministerial Logotype

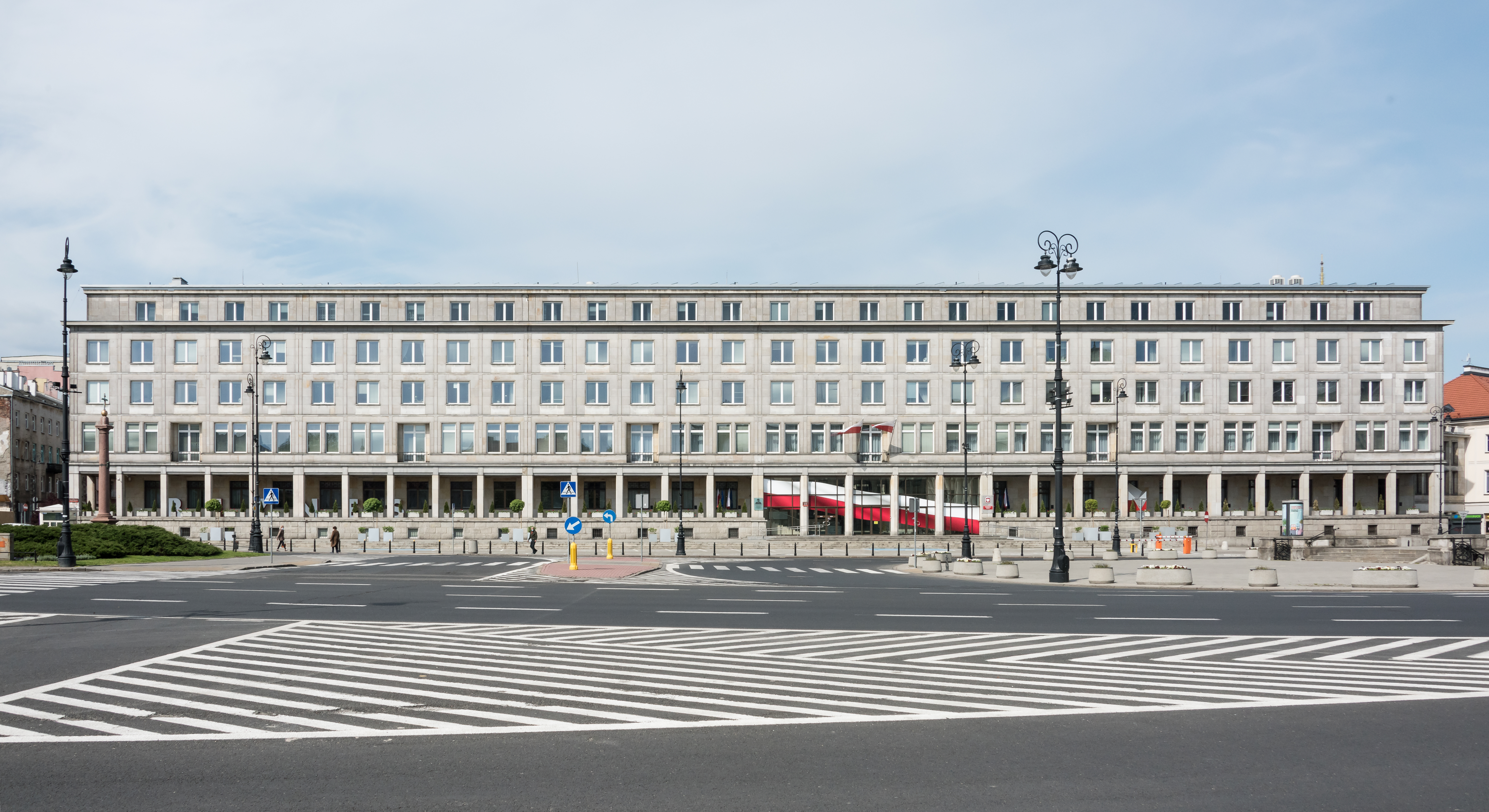

Agency overview
- Formed: 16 November 2015/ 15 November 2019
- Preceding agency: Ministry of Infrastructure and Development
- Jurisdiction: Poland
- Headquarters: Warsaw
- Parent agency: Council of Ministers
- Website: www.gov.pl

Ministry of Economic Development (Polish: Ministerstwo Rozwoju) was the office of government in Poland responsible for economy and regional development. Mateusz Morawiecki was the last Minister of Development. It was created in late 2015 from the split of the Ministry of Infrastructure and Development and dissolved in 2018, after creation of Ministry of Investment and Economic Development.

15 November 2019 the ministry has been reactivated at the forefront Jadwiga Emilewicz
