= Mateusz Morawiecki =

Prime Minister of Poland from 2017 to 2023

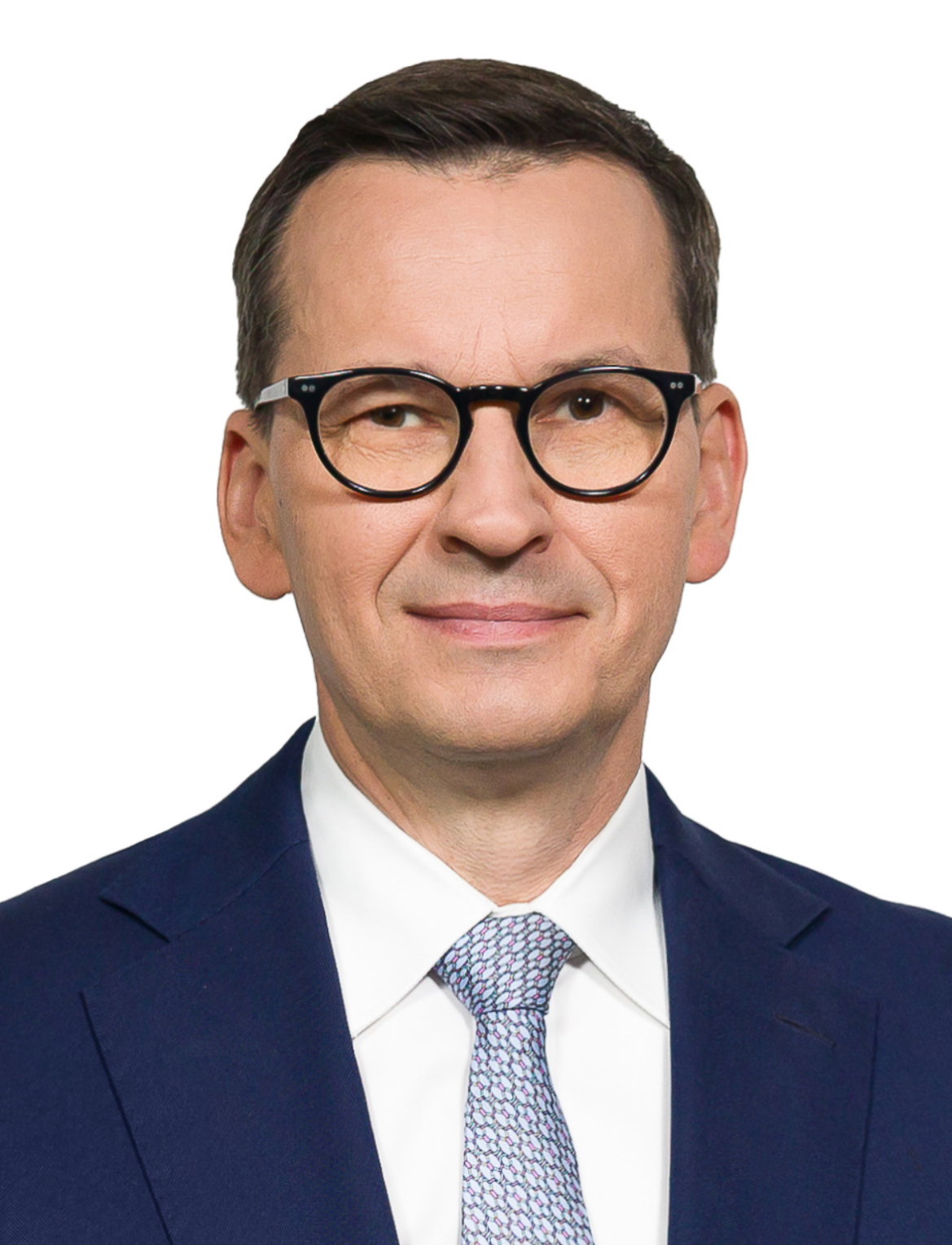
- Official portrait, 2023

President of the European Conservatives and Reformists Party
- In office 14 January 2025 – 28 July 2026
- Vice President: George Simion
- Preceded by: Giorgia Meloni
- Succeeded by: Adam Bielan

Prime Minister of Poland
- In office 11 December 2017 – 13 December 2023
- President: Andrzej Duda
- Deputy: See list: Piotr Gliński (2017–2023); Jarosław Gowin (2017–2020, 2020–2021); Beata Szydło (2017–2019); Jacek Sasin (2019–2023); Jadwiga Emilewicz (2020); Jarosław Kaczyński (2020–2022, 2023); Henryk Kowalczyk (2021–2023); Mariusz Błaszczak (2022–2023)
- Preceded by: Beata Szydło
- Succeeded by: Donald Tusk

Deputy Prime Minister of Poland
- In office 16 November 2015 – 11 December 2017 Serving with Piotr Gliński, Jarosław Gowin
- Prime Minister: Beata Szydło
- Preceded by: Janusz Piechociński
- Succeeded by: Beata Szydło
Ministerial positions
Minister of Finance
In office 28 September 2016 – 9 January 2018
Prime Minister	Beata Szydło; Himself
Preceded by	Paweł Szałamacha
Succeeded by	Teresa Czerwińska
Minister of Development
In office 16 November 2015 – 9 January 2018
Prime Minister	Beata Szydło; Himself
Preceded by	Maria Wasiak
Succeeded by	Jerzy Kwieciński
Minister of Sport and Tourism
In office 15 November 2019 – 5 December 2019
Prime Minister	Himself
Preceded by	Witold Bańka
Succeeded by	Danuta Dmowska

Member of the Sejm
- Incumbent
- Assumed office 9 August 2019
- Constituency: no. 31

Personal details
- Born: Mateusz Jakub Morawiecki; 20 June 1968 (age 58) Wrocław, Poland
- Party: Independent (before 2016, since 2026)
- Other political affiliations: Law and Justice (2016–2026); Rozwój Plus (since 2026)
- Spouse: Iwona Morawiecka
- Children: 4
- Parent: Kornel Morawiecki (father)
- Education: University of Wrocław (BA); Wrocław University of Science and Technology; Wrocław University of Economics (MBA); University of Hamburg; University of Basel (MAS)
- Occupation: Economist, historian, magazine editor, politician
- Awards: Order of Polonia Restituta Cross of Freedom and Solidarity Honorary Badge "For Merits to Banking of the Republic of Poland" Silver Cross of the Fighting Solidarity Order for Merits to Lithuania Order of Prince Yaroslav the Wise
- Website: mateuszmorawiecki.pl
- Mateusz Morawiecki's voice Morawiecki on George Simion in Bucharest; Recorded 14 March 2025

Mateusz Jakub Morawiecki (Note: Polish pronunciation: [maˈtɛuʂ ˈjakup mɔraˈvjɛt͡skʲi]) (born 20 June 1968) is a Polish economist and politician who served as Prime Minister of Poland from 2017 to 2023. A former member of the Law and Justice (PiS) party, he previously served in the cabinet of prime minister Beata Szydło as deputy prime minister from 2015 to 2017, Minister of Development from 2015 to 2018 and Minister of Finance from 2016 to 2018. Prior to his political appointment, Morawiecki had an extensive business career.

Born in Wrocław, Morawiecki became heavily engaged in anti-communist movements in his youth. He attended the University of Wrocław and extended his education at the University of Hamburg and University of Basel. He obtained degrees in arts, business administration and advanced studies. From 1996 to 2004, Morawiecki lectured at the Wrocław University of Economics, as well as from 1996 to 1998 at the Wrocław University of Technology. From 1998, Morawiecki worked for Bank Zachodni WBK from the Santander Group, where he was promoted to the position of managing director and eventually chairman.

On 11 December 2017, following prime minister Szydło's resignation, Morawiecki was nominated to succeed her by the chief staff of the Law and Justice party, which he joined in 2016. He led the party to win a second-term in the 2019 Polish parliamentary election. On 27 November 2023, after the United Right had failed to secure majority in the Sejm in the 2023 Polish parliamentary election, Morawiecki became the leader of a caretaker government. On 11 December 2023, Morawiecki lost the vote of confidence from the Sejm, effectively terminating his cabinet's tenure. He remained acting prime minister until 13 December 2023, when his successor and leader of the opposition Donald Tusk was sworn in as prime minister.

== Early life and education ==
Mateusz Morawiecki was born 20 June 1968 in Wrocław, Silesia, to Kornel Morawiecki (3 May 1941 – 30 September 2019), physicist and Fighting Solidarity leader), and his wife Jadwiga (22 May 1930 – 3 August 2025), chemist and opposition activist.

Morawiecki stated in a press interview that at the age of 12 he helped his father copying underground political literature and in August 1980 he plastered the streets of Wrocław with posters calling for a general strike. After martial law was declared in 1981, he helped print and distribute underground Solidarity magazines. As a son of a well known opposition activist, he was sometimes detained and intimidated by the police. In an interview, he said he threw Molotov cocktails at police cars and was on many occasions stopped and beaten by Poland's secret police (Służba Bezpieczeństwa, SB). Another reason for this was his sympathising with the Hippie movement as an early teenager, a time during which he underwent an arrest due to alleged cannabis possession. This was also the time he first encountered Ryszard Terlecki – a precursor of the Hippie movement in Poland, and later one of his close coworkers. In connection to this, Morawiecki has mentioned that his colleague from the PiS party "knows perfectly well what fighting for freedom means".

In the 1980s, at the age of 12, he edited an illegal political newspaper Lower Silesia Bulletin and was active in the Independent Students' Association. He continued taking part in political demonstrations until the late 1980s and participated in occupation strikes at the University of Wroclaw in 1988 and 1989. He co-organised the Club for Political Thought "Free and Solidary".

Morawiecki is an alumnus of the University of Wrocław (history, 1992), Wrocław University of Technology (1993), Wrocław University of Economics (Business Administration, 1995), the University of Hamburg (European Law and Economic Integration, 1995–97), and the University of Basel (European Studies, 1995–97). While at the Wrocław University of Technology, he studied abroad at Central Connecticut State University and completed an advanced executive programme at Northwestern University's Kellogg School of Management.

== Business career ==
In 1991 Morawiecki began work at Cogito Company and co-created two publishing firms, Reverentia and Enter Marketing-Publishing. That same year he co-founded the magazine Dwa Dni (Two Days), later becoming editor-in-chief.

In 1995 he completed an internship at Deutsche Bundesbank in credit analysis, financial restructuring, banking supervision, and financial market supervision. In 1996–97 he conducted banking and macroeconomic research at the University of Frankfurt. In 1998, as deputy director of the Accession Negotiations Department in the Committee for European Integration, he oversaw and participated in numerous areas, including finance, of the negotiations for Polish accession to the European Union.

With Frank Emmert, he co-authored the first textbook on The Law of the European Union published in Poland.

From 1996 to 2004 Morawiecki lectured at the Wrocław University of Economics, and from 1996 to 1998 also at the Wrocław University of Technology. He sat on policy committees at many institutions of higher education. From 1998 to 2001 he was a member of the supervisory boards of the Wałbrzych Power Company, Dialog (a local telephone-service provider), and the Industrial Development Agency. From 1998 to 2002 he was a member of the Lower Silesian Regional Assembly.

From November 1998 Morawiecki worked for Bank Zachodni WBK, Santander Group, where he began his career as deputy chair of the supervisory board, and supervisor of the economic analysis bureau and the international trade department. In 2001 he became managing director and a member of the board. In 2007–15 Morawiecki was chairman of Bank Zachodni WBK.

== Political career ==
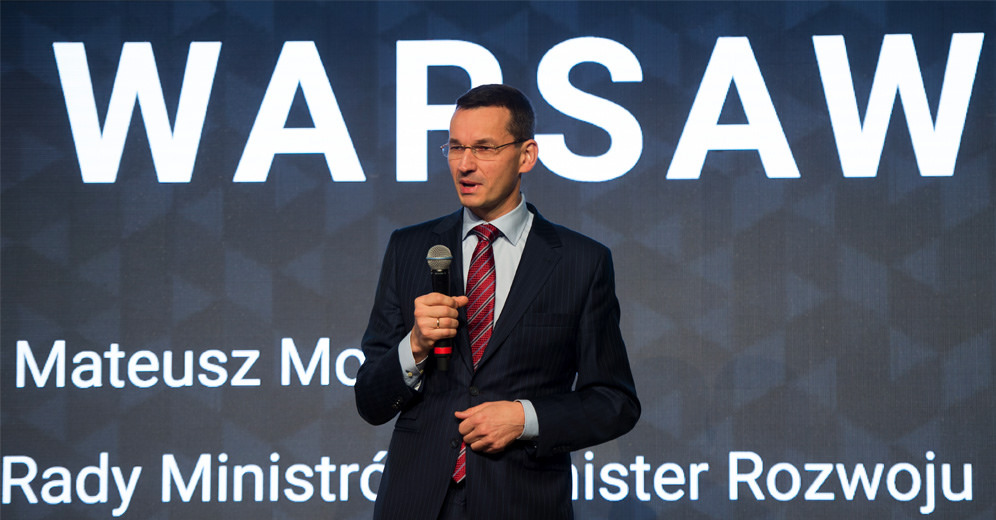
Morawiecki at opening of Campus Warsaw

=== Deputy Prime Minister (2015–2017) ===
On 16 November 2015, President Andrzej Duda appointed Morawiecki as both Deputy Prime Minister and Minister of Development in the Cabinet led by Prime Minister Beata Szydło. (This took place soon after Mateusz Morawiecki's father, Kornel Morawiecki, was elected to Poland's lower chamber of the parliament and the Law and Justice party won the 2015 parliamentary elections.)

In March 2016, Morawiecki announced that he had joined the Law and Justice party.

=== Finance Minister (2016–2017) ===
On 28 September 2016, in addition to his other positions, Morawiecki was appointed Minister of Finance, becoming the second most powerful member of the Government, overseeing the budget, government finances, European Union funds, and overall economic policy.

As finance minister, Morawiecki outlined an ambitious "Plan for Responsible Development", known colloquially as the "Morawiecki Plan", aimed at stimulating economic growth and raising revenues for generous government plans, including "Family 500+" child benefits for all families with two or more children. In March 2017, he took part in a meeting of G20 finance ministers in Baden-Baden, becoming Poland's first-ever representative at that summit.

=== Prime Minister (2017–2023) ===
==== First term (2017–2019) ====
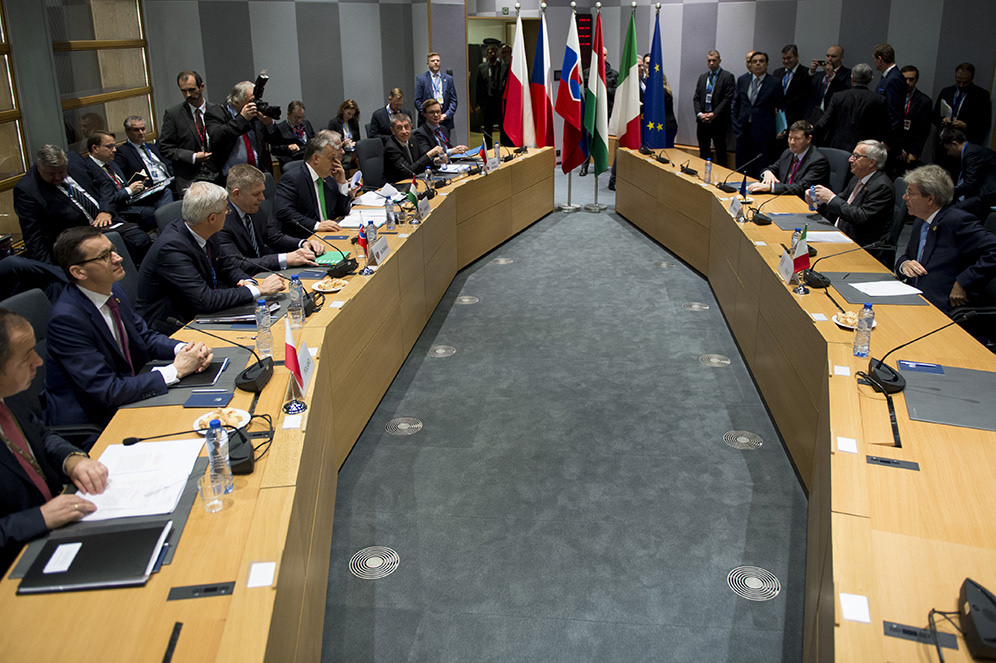
Morawiecki with Visegrád Group (V4) leaders and European Commission President Jean Claude Juncker, Brussels 2017

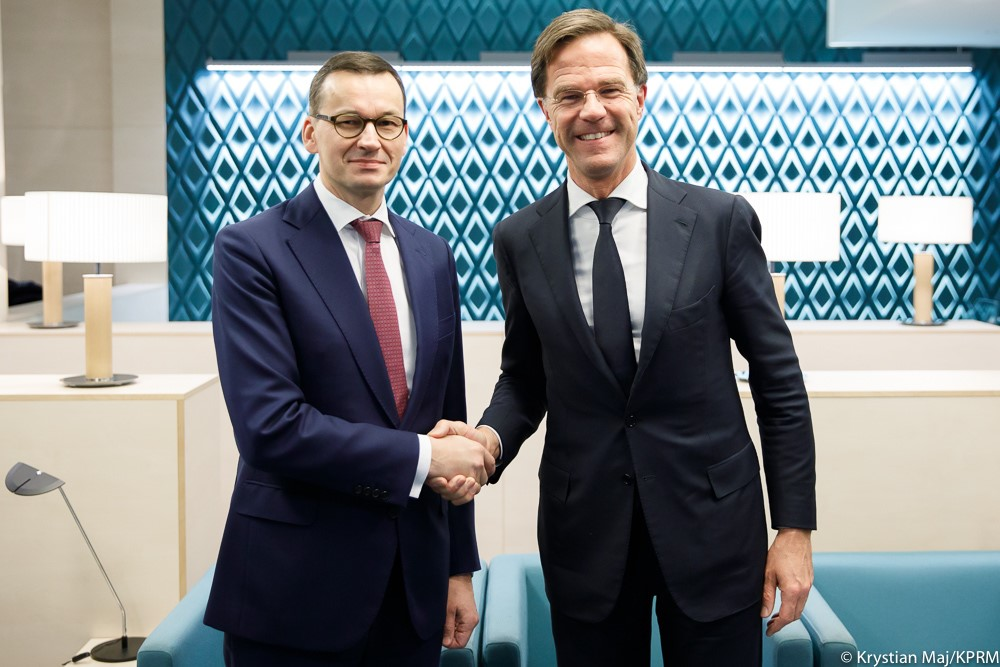
Morawiecki with Dutch Prime Minister Mark Rutte in Katowice, 4 December 2018

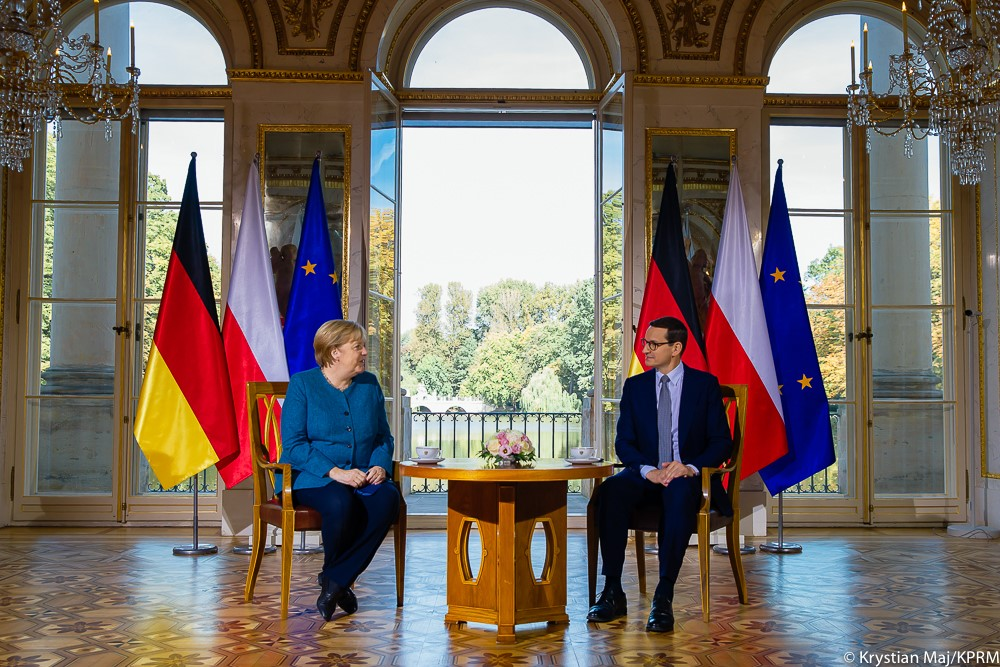
Morawiecki with German Chancellor Angela Merkel in Warsaw, 11 September 2021

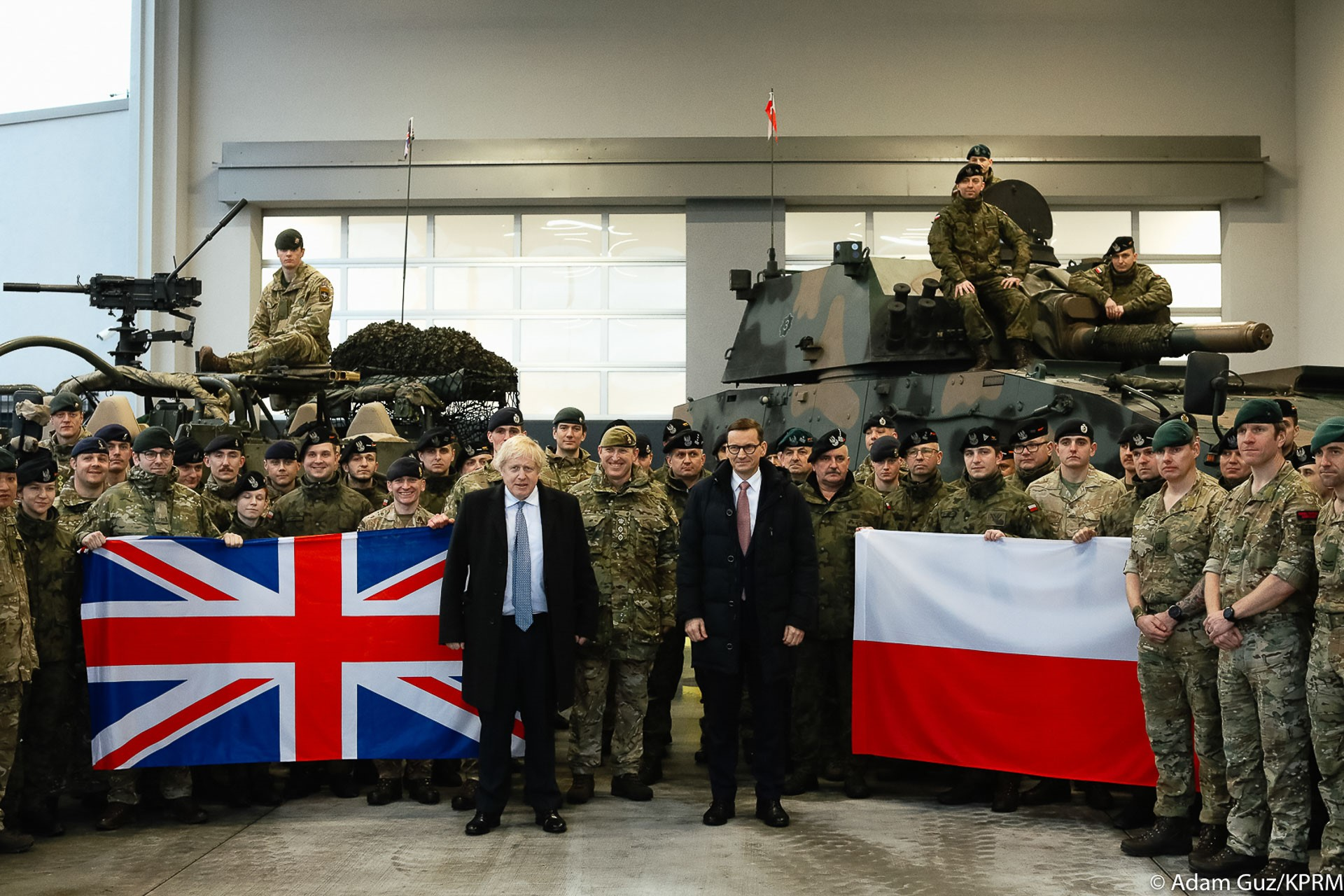
Morawiecki with British Prime Minister Boris Johnson in Warsaw, 10 February 2022

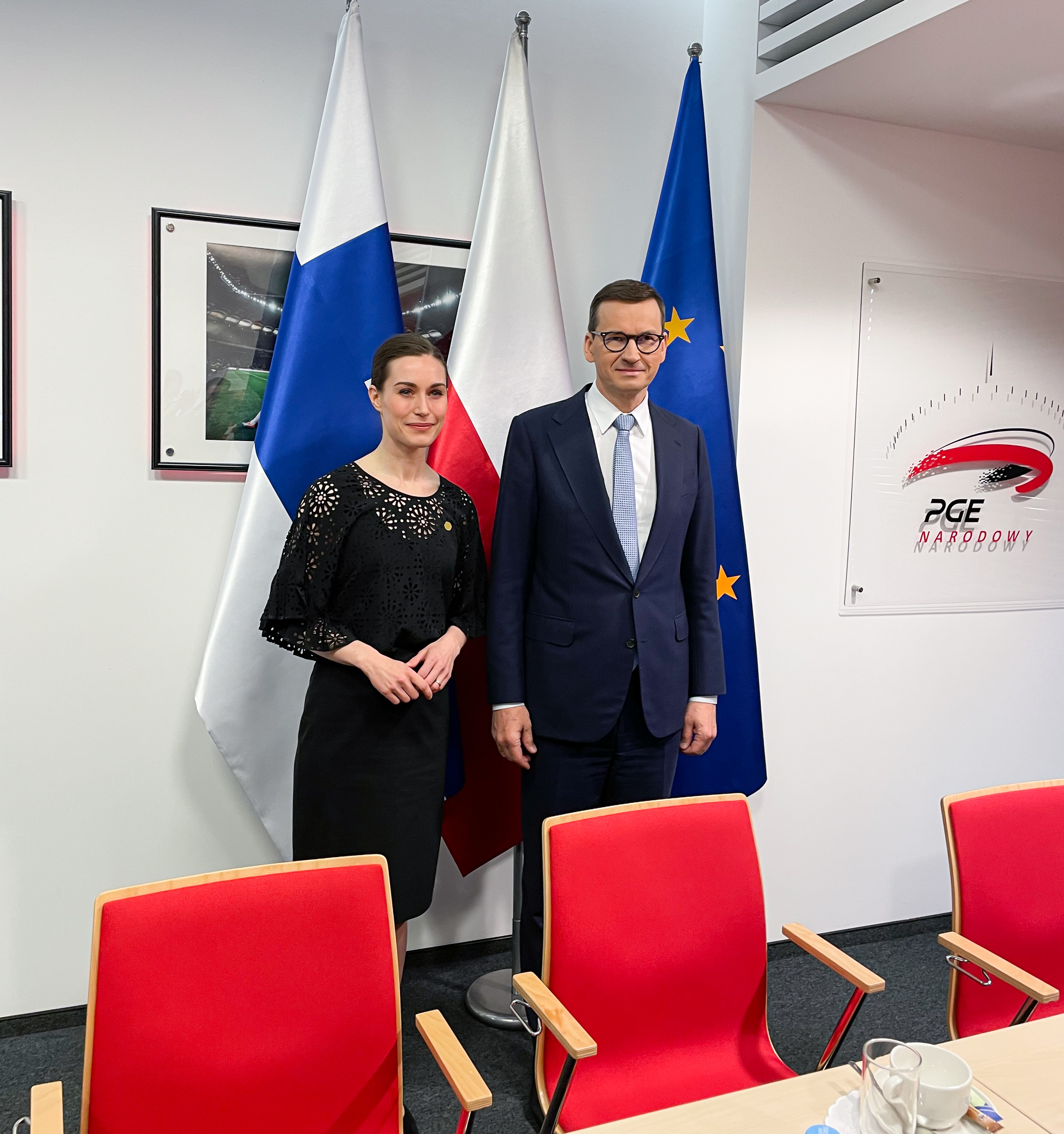
Morawiecki with Finnish Prime Minister Sanna Marin in Warsaw, 5 May 2022

In December 2017, Jarosław Kaczyński, the Chairman of the Law and Justice party, declared that he no longer had confidence in Beata Szydło to be the party's prime ministerial candidate, in part due to perceived conflict between her and other European Union leaders. With her position untenable, Szydło resigned, and Morawiecki quickly won internal party approval to be nominated as her successor. He was sworn in as prime minister of Poland on 11 December, immediately appointing Szydło as his deputy. In his first major address to Sejm, he pledged "continuity" rather than radical change.

In January 2018, following a highly public racist incident in Warsaw, Morawiecki declared: "There is no place in Poland for racism. The attack on a girl because of her skin color deserves the strongest condemnation. We shall do everything to make Poland safe for everyone."

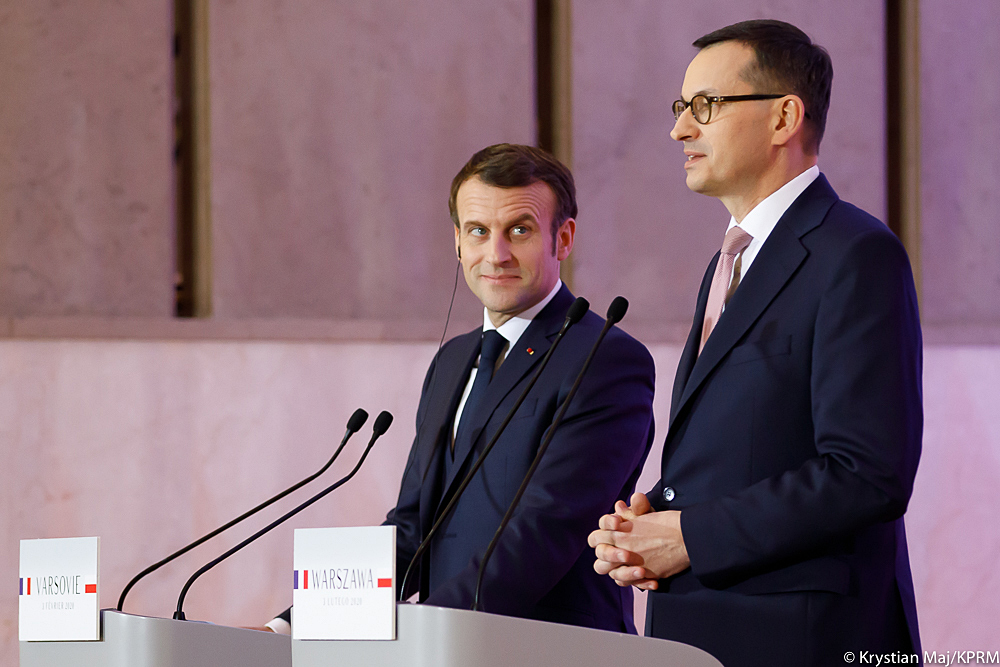
Morawiecki and French President Emmanuel Macron during press conference, 2022

At the Munich Security Conference on 17 February that year, Morawiecki said "it is not going to be seen as criminal to say that there were Polish perpetrators, as there were Jewish perpetrators, as there were Russian perpetrators, as there were Ukrainian perpetrators, not only German perpetrators." His remark roused controversy and prompted criticism by prominent Israeli politicians, including Israeli prime minister Benjamin Netanyahu and Israeli President Reuven Rivlin. The crisis was resolved in late June that year when the Polish and Israeli prime ministers issued a joint communiqué endorsing research into the Jewish Holocaust and condemning the expression, "Polish concentration camps".

As other Visegrád Group leaders, Morawiecki opposes any compulsory EU long-term quota on redistribution of migrants. In May 2018, Morawiecki said: "Proposals by the European Union that impose quotas on us hit the very foundations of national sovereignty."

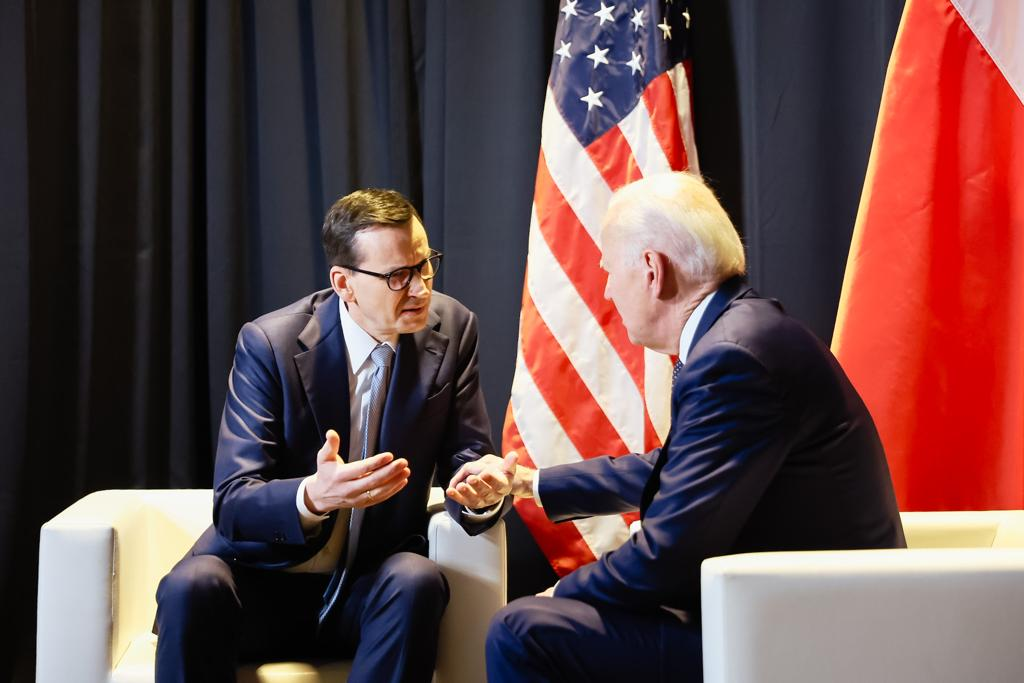
Morawiecki during meeting with U.S. President Joe Biden, 2023

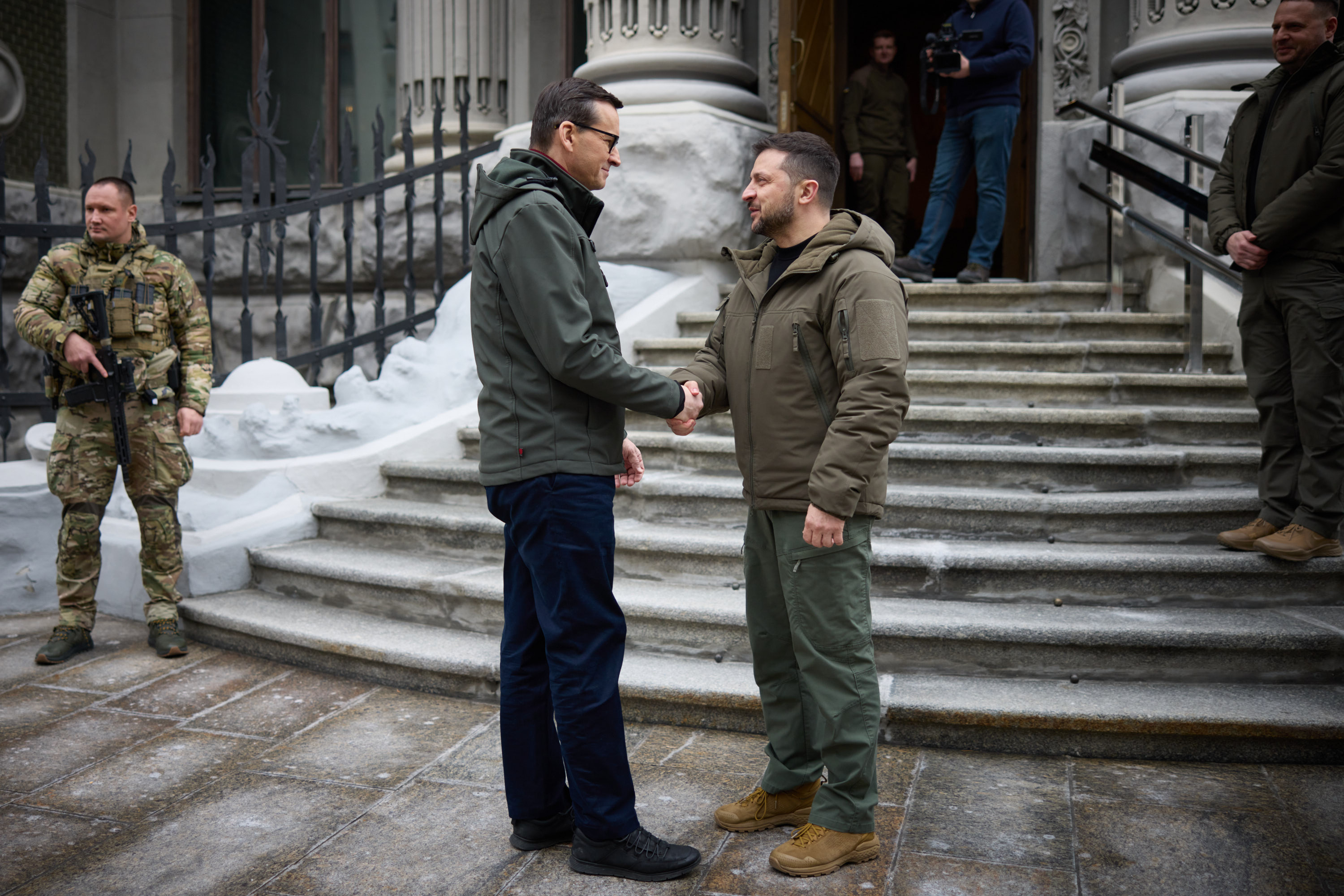
Morawiecki with the President of Ukraine, Volodymyr Zelenskyy, during a meeting in Kyiv, 24 February 2023

In July 2018, Morawiecki said he "will not rest" until "the whole truth" of the World War II-era massacres in Volhynia and Eastern Galicia has been explained. Between 1942 and 1945, members of the Ukrainian Insurgent Army (UPA) killed up to 100,000 civilians in what is now Western Ukraine.

On the issue of Brexit, Morawiecki told the BBC in January 2019 that more and more Polish people are returning to Poland from the UK and he hoped the trend would continue to help boost the Polish economy.

In January 2019, Morawiecki said that "Hitler's Germany fed on fascist ideology... But all the evil came from this (German) state and we cannot forget that, because otherwise we relativise evil." Morawiecki wants Germany to pay World War II reparations for the destruction it caused during World War II. In August 2019, he said that "Poland has yet to receive proper compensation from Germany… We lost six million people over the course of the war — many more than did countries that received major reparations."

==== Second term (2019–2023) ====
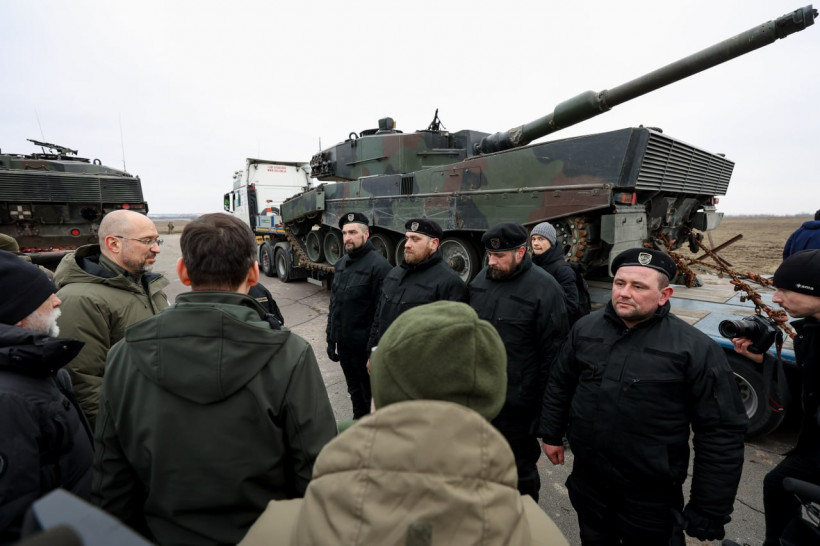
Morawiecki and Ukrainian Prime Minister Denys Shmyhal with Ukrainian tank crew members and Leopard 2 tanks provided by Poland, 24 February 2023

On 13 October 2019, Morawiecki led PiS to a re-election victory in that year's parliamentary election. PiS won its highest ever vote in a parliamentary election to date, taking in 43.6% of the national vote and retaining majority government. At the first sitting of the Sejm of the 9th term, he resigned from the Council of Ministers (pursuant to Article 162(1) of the Constitution of the Republic of Poland), which was accepted by the President on the same day.

On 15 September 2020, the Voivodeship administrative court in Warsaw ruled that the decision of Morawiecki to hold the elections only by postal vote on 10 May 2020 was a "gross violation of the law and was issued without [legal] grounds" and violated article 7 of the Polish Constitution, article 157, paragraph 1 and article 187, paragraph 1 and 2 of the Electoral Code. The opposition demanded Morawiecki's resignation.

In October 2021, Morawiecki accused the European Union of blackmail over several issues. However, he downplayed the possibility of a "Polexit" and said that the threat of economic sanctions was a "direct challenge". In July 2021, he became the vice-president of Law and Justice.

In November 2021, Polish security forces made headlines for turning away migrants at the Belarusian border. They used tear gas and water cannons to deter migrants rioting and destroying border fencing in an attempt to access the EU by crossing into Poland. According to the Associated Press, Poland's strong stance on illegal and irregular migration was largely met with approval from other European nations hoping to avoid another migrant crisis.

In December 2021, German Chancellor Olaf Scholz came to Warsaw for talks with Morawiecki. They discussed Poland’s dispute with the EU over the rule of law, the long-term EU climate policies and the Nord Stream 2 gas pipeline, which would bring Russian gas to Germany and bypass Poland. Morawiecki said "we do not want people to suffer as a result" of EU's Green Deal, accusing the bloc's Emissions Trading System of contributing to the 2021 global energy crisis. From 10 February to 26 April 2022, he performed the duties of the Minister of Finance after the dismissal of Tadeusz Kościński.

Morawiecki was one of the first European leaders to call for sanctions against Russia, following the Russian invasion of Ukraine, calling the invasion a "crime" and "an act of barbarism". He travelled to Brussels for an emergency meeting of the European Council and called for freezing Russian assets, cutting Russia off from SWIFT and blocking Nord Stream 2. He was one of the first European leaders to support sending military equipment to Ukraine, which he did himself as Prime Minister. He also opened the Polish border to Ukrainian refugees, which led to about 2.1 million refugees entering the country in March 2022. Morawiecki's uncompromising support for military aid to Ukraine was met with backlash from some far-right and nationalistic politicians, such as Krzysztof Bosak.

In January 2023, Morawiecki said he supported the death penalty.

In February 2023, as the 2022 Russian invasion of Ukraine entered its second year, Morawiecki told Hungarian President Katalin Novák in a formal meeting at the Bucharest Nine summit in Warsaw that "We must prepare for years-long deterrence and defence against the Russian threat."

In February 2023, Morawiecki said that Poland would "use its own good relations" with Turkey under Erdoğan to persuade it "to the fastest possible, and preferably concurrent, accession of Finland and Sweden to NATO."

In March 2023, he visited Saudi Arabia and met with Saudi Crown Prince and de facto ruler Mohammed bin Salman.

In March 2023, after General Secretary of the Chinese Communist Party Xi Jinping's three-day visit to Russia, Morawiecki expressed concern about a "dangerous" China-Russian alliance. On 14 April after the visit of Emmanuel Macron to Beijing, where he met CCP general secretary Xi Jinping and caused alarm in Washington because he spoke of France's "sovereign autonomy", Morawiecki went there and read a prepared paper to a diplomatic audience. In those remarks he said that "You can not protect Ukraine today and tomorrow by saying that Taiwan is none of our business. You have to support Ukraine if you want Taiwan to remain independent. If Ukraine is conquered, the next day China can attack Taiwan. I see here a very big connection, a lot of correlation between the situation in Ukraine and the situation in Taiwan and China." This caused the Chinese MFA to react sharply and inimically.

In April 2023, Morawiecki told the Atlantic Council think-tank that: "Our relationship with Hungary changed a lot because of the position of Hungary toward Ukraine and Russia" after the invasion. "We had once very strong cooperation on the level of the Visegrad group [Czech Republic, Hungary, Poland, and Slovakia], now much less so."

In July 2023, Morawiecki warned that Poland is not planning to open its borders to imports of agricultural products from Ukraine, saying "We protect our agriculture, that’s why we don’t open borders for agricultural goods from Ukraine."

Morawiecki's government has faced allegations of spying on hundreds of people, including leading opposition figures, using Pegasus software. Among those targeted whose names have been revealed are Krzysztof Brejza (Civic Platform campaign leader), former foreign minister Radoslaw Sikorski, former finance minister Jacek Rostowski, Michał Kołodziejczak (leader of a peasant protest movement). In addition to these leading figures, there are also former ministers from Donald Tusk's first governments (2007–2014), three retired Polish army generals, two lobbyists for US arms firms, the president of one of the main employers' organisations, as well as a number of PiS representatives. Much of the information obtained with the software, notably SMS and e-mail correspondence, was made public in allegedly manipulated forms by public television. The latter, which was accused of being aligned with the government, used this information to organise campaigns to discredit opposition figures.

==== Third term (2023) ====
In October 2023, he was re-elected as a member of the Sejm. On 6 November, President Andrzej Duda in his message to the nation announced he would designate Morawiecki as prime minister. On 27 November, he was confirmed as prime minister with a new cabinet. However, heavy losses for Law and Justice left his cabinet well short of majority support in the Sejm. An opposition coalition fronted by former prime minister Donald Tusk had enough seats between them to defeat Morawiecki and nominate Tusk in his place. As expected, Morawiecki's cabinet was defeated in the legislature on 11 December, and Tusk was elected his successor.

=== Post-premiership (2023–present) ===
On 14 January 2025, Morawiecki was appointed president of European Conservatives and Reformists Party (ECR), succeeding Italian prime minister Giorgia Meloni with Romanian AUR chairman George Simion as his vice-president. In February, Morawiecki was charged with abuse of power over his decision to hold the 2020 presidential elections solely by postal ballot. On 14 March, he accompanied Simion in Bucharest to the Central Electoral Bureau to file the latter's candidacy for president of Romania, following the annulment of the 2024 presidential election due to alleged Russian meddling in favour of first round winner Călin Georgescu. On 28 July 2026, Morawiecki announced his intention to resign as president of the European Conservatives and Reformists Party (ECR).

On 24 July 2026 Mateusz Morawiecki was removed from Law and Justice, alongside with 30 other MPs. The removal was caused by the refusal of the MPs to leave an intra-party association called Rozwój+ (Development+). Critics pointed out growing divides between two factions of Law and Justice - the so called "Maślarze" focused around Przemysław Czarnek and "Harcerze" focused around Morawiecki, with competing visions for the party's developments. Morawiecki had, beforehand, criticised the party's rightward shift, opting instead for movement in a centre-right direction.

Morawiecki has announced plans to form his own political party and run for the 2027 elections under his own banner.

== Personal life ==
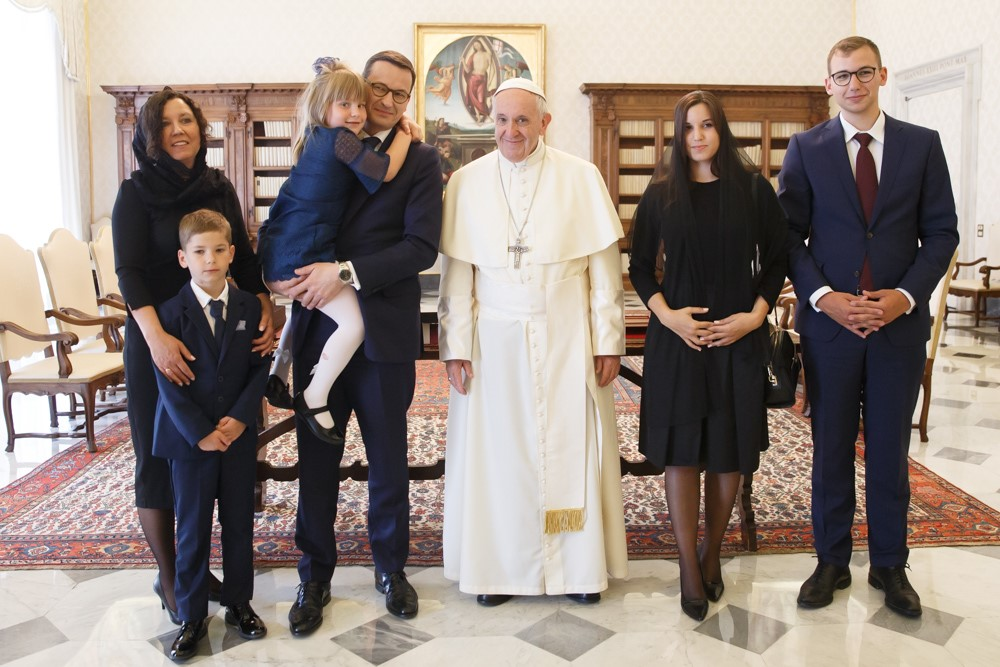
Pope Francis with Morawiecki and his family during a private audience at the Vatican, 2018

Morawiecki is married to Iwona Morawiecka, with whom he has four children: two daughters (Olga and Magdalena) and two sons (Jeremiasz and Ignacy).

== Other posts ==
- Ex-officio member, Board of Governors, Asian Infrastructure Investment Bank (AIIB)
- Ex-officio member, Board of Governors, International Monetary Fund (IMF)

== Honours ==
Poland:

- Knight's Cross of the Order of Polonia Restituta (2015)
- Cross of Freedom and Solidarity (2013)
- Honorary Badge "For Merits to Banking of the Republic of Poland" (2011)
- Silver Cross of the Fighting Solidarity (2021)

Lithuania:

- Grand Cross of the Order for Merits to Lithuania (2019)

Ukraine:

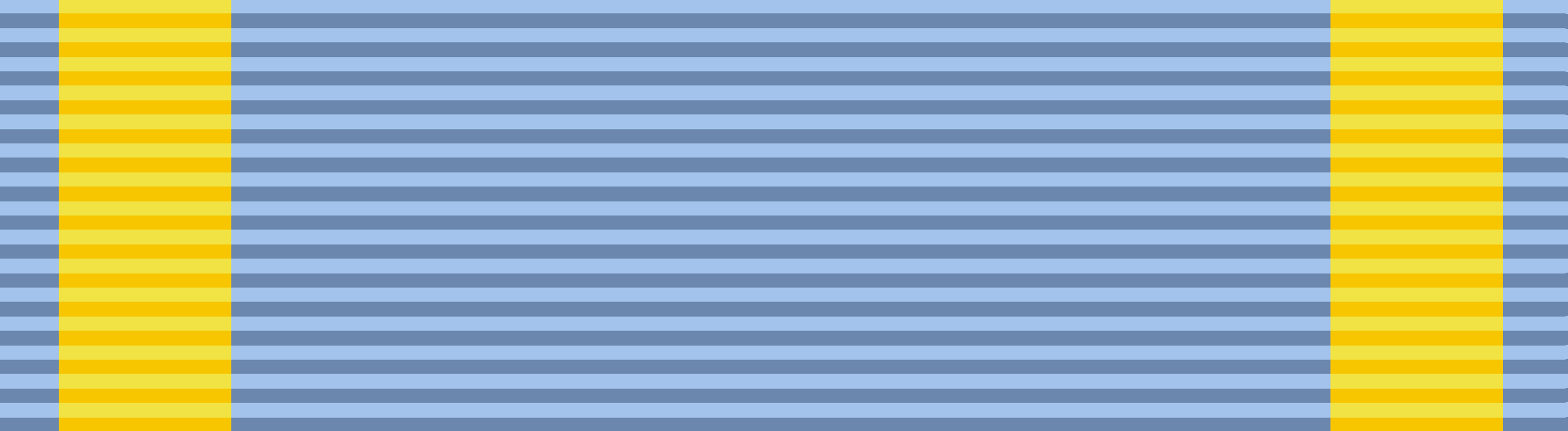
- Order of Prince Yaroslav the Wise, 2nd class (2022)

In 2008 Morawiecki was made Honorary Consul of the Republic of Ireland in Poland. In 2013 he was awarded the Cross of Freedom and Solidarity. In 2015, he became the recipient of the Knight's Cross of the Order of Polonia Restituta. In 2019, he was awarded the title Man of the Year at the annual Krynica Economic Forum. He has also received other distinctions from economic clubs, universities, publishing houses, and cultural institutions.

Political offices
Preceded by Janusz Piechociński	Deputy Prime Minister of Poland; 2015–2017	Succeeded by Beata Szydło
Preceded by Maria Wasiak	Minister of Development; 2015–2018	Succeeded by Jerzy Kwieciński
Preceded by Paweł Szałamacha	Minister of Finance; 2016–2018	Succeeded by Teresa Czerwińska
Preceded by Beata Szydło	Prime Minister of Poland; 2017–2023	Succeeded by Donald Tusk
Preceded by Witold Bańka	Minister of Sports and Tourism; 2019	Succeeded by Danuta Dmowska
