= Sejm Constituency no. 30 =

Polish parliamentary constituency

Bielsko-Biała II
- Constituency for the Sejm
- Location of Bielsko-Biała II within Poland
- Counties: Mikołów County; Racibórz County; Rybnik County; Wodzisław Śląski County
- Voivodeship: Silesia
- Population: 675 054 (2022)
- Electorate: 533,844 (2023)

Current Constituency
- Created: 2001 (as Rybnik); 2019 (as Bielsko-Biała II)
- Seats: 9
- Deputies: List: Roman Fritz (KKP); Krzysztof Gadowski (PO-KO); Paweł Jabłoński (PiS); Marek Krząkała (PO-KO); Gabriela Lenartowicz (PO-KO); Grzegorz Matusiak (PiS); Łukasz Osmalak (Poland 2050); Marcin Przydacz (PiS); Michał Woś (PiS)

Bielsko-Biała II, formerly known as Rybnik, officially known as Constituency no. 30 (Polish: Okręg wyborczy nr 30), is one of the 41 constituencies of the Sejm, the lower house of the Parliament of Poland, the national legislature of Poland. The constituency was established in 2001, after a major redistricting process across Poland. It is located in the Łódź Voivodeship and includes the area of three city counties: Jastrzębie-Zdrój, Rybnik and Żory as well as the counties of: Mikołów, Racibórz, Rybnik, and Wodzisław Śląski. The constituency's district electoral commission is located in Bielsko-Biała (Note: The constituency's district electoral commission was located in Rybnik until 2019.)
The constituency currently elects 9 of the 460 members of the Sejm using the open party-list proportional representation electoral system. At the 2023 parliamentary election it had 533,844 citizens eligible to vote.

== List of deputies ==
Deputies for the 10th Sejm (2023–2027)
Deputy	Party	Parliamentary group
Roman Fritz	Confederation of the Polish Crown	Confederation of the Polish Crown
Krzysztof Gadowski	Civic Platform	Civic Coalition
Marek Krząkała	Civic Platform	Civic Coalition
Gabriela Lenartowicz	Civic Platform	Civic Coalition
Paweł Jabłoński	Law and Justice	United Right
Grzegorz Matusiak	Law and Justice	United Right
Bolesław Piecha	Law and Justice	United Right
Michał Woś	Law and Justice	United Right
Łukasz Osmalak	Poland 2050	Poland 2050

== Election results ==
=== 2001 ===
2001 parliamentary election: Bielsko Biała II
Party	Votes	%	Seats
Democratic Left Alliance – Labour Union	93,973	40.16	5
Civic Platform	42,216	18.04	2
Law and Justice	22,481	9.61	1
Solidarity of the Right Electoral Action	17,676	7.55	–
Self-Defence of the Republic of Poland	16,616	7.10	1
League of Polish Families	13,971	5.97	–
Freedom Union	9,898	4.23	–
Polish People's Party	9,718	4.15	–
German Minority Electoral Committee	4,890	2.09	–
Social Alternative Movement	1,924	0.82	–
Polish Economic Union	617	0.26	–
Total	233,980	100.00	9
Valid votes	233,980	93.16	
Invalid/blank votes	17,173	6.84	
Total votes	251,153	100.00	
Registered voters/turnout	567,854	44.23	
Source: National Electoral Commission

=== 2005 ===
2005 parliamentary election: Bielsko Biała II
Party	Votes	%	Seats
Civic Platform	71,152	31.67	4
Law and Justice	70,401	31.33	4
Democratic Left Alliance	26,187	11.65	1
Self-Defence of the Republic of Poland	17,170	7.64	–
League of Polish Families	15,741	7.01	–
Social Democracy of Poland	5,743	2.56	–
Polish People's Party	5,608	2.50	–
Democratic Party – demokraci.pl	3,711	1.65	–
Liberty and Lawfulness	3,081	1.37	–
Polish Labour Party	2,132	0.95	–
Patriotic Movement	1,368	0.61	–
Centre	1,169	0.52	–
Polish National Party	618	0.28	–
Polish Confederation – Dignity and Work	606	0.27	–
Total	224,687	100.00	9
Valid votes	224,687	96.95	
Invalid/blank votes	7,067	3.05	
Total votes	231,754	100.00	
Registered voters/turnout	582,578	39.78	
Source: National Electoral Commission

=== 2007 ===
2007 parliamentary election: Bielsko Biała II
Party	Votes	%	Seats
Civic Platform	134,945	44.55	4
Law and Justice	109,748	36.23	4
Left and Democrats	36,309	11.99	1
Polish People's Party	12,071	3.98	–
Polish Labour Party	3,905	1.29	–
League of Polish Families	3,045	1.01	–
Self-Defence of the Republic of Poland	2,891	0.95	–
Total	302,914	100.00	9
Valid votes	302,914	98.03	
Invalid/blank votes	6,077	1.97	
Total votes	308,991	100.00	
Registered voters/turnout	583,350	52.97	
Source: National Electoral Commission

=== 2011 ===
2011 parliamentary election: Bielsko Biała II
Party	Votes	%	Seats
Civic Platform	118,524	44.89	5
Law and Justice	75,504	28.59	3
Palikot's Movement	23,804	9.01	1
Democratic Left Alliance	20,908	7.92	–
Polish People's Party	9,206	3.49	–
Poland Comes First	8,448	3.20	–
Congress of the New Right	5,100	1.93	–
Polish Labour Party - August 80	1,717	0.65	–
Right Wing	842	0.32	–
Total	264,053	100.00	9
Valid votes	264,053	95.16	
Invalid/blank votes	13,425	4.84	
Total votes	277,478	100.00	
Registered voters/turnout	584,310	47.49	
Source: National Electoral Commission

=== 2015 ===
2015 parliamentary election: Bielsko Biała II
Party	Votes	%	Seats
Law and Justice	114,799	39.59	5
Civic Platform	70,188	24.21	3
Kukiz'15	32,794	11.31	1
Modern	18,341	6.33	–
United Left	17,201	5.93	–
KORWiN	13,136	4.53	–
Together	9,669	3.33	–
United for Silesia	7,928	2.73	–
Polish People's Party	5,197	1.79	–
Grzegorz Braun's Electoral Committee "God Bless You!"	710	0.24	–
Total	289,963	100.00	9
Valid votes	289,963	97.44	
Invalid/blank votes	7,605	2.56	
Total votes	297,568	100.00	
Registered voters/turnout	574,191	51.82	
Source: National Electoral Commission

=== 2019 ===
2019 parliamentary election: Bielsko Biała II
Party	Votes	%	Seats
Law and Justice	161,160	48.28	5
Civic Coalition	92,493	27.71	3
The Left	32,300	9.68	1
Confederation Liberty and Independence	23,939	7.17	–
Polish People's Party	18,816	5.64	–
Nonpartisan Local Government Activists	5,128	1.54	–
Total	333,836	100.00	9
Valid votes	333,836	99.02	
Invalid/blank votes	3,294	0.98	
Total votes	337,130	100.00	
Registered voters/turnout	558,077	60.41	
Source: National Electoral Commission

=== 2023 ===
2023 parliamentary election: Bielsko Biała II
Party	Votes	%	Seats
Law and Justice	145,230	38.06	6
Civic Coalition	114,404	29.98	3
Third Way	47,525	12.45	2
The Left	30,527	8.00	1
Confederation Liberty and Independence	26,117	6.84	–
There is One Poland	9,148	2.40	–
Nonpartisan Local Government Activists	8,647	2.27	–
Total	381,598	100.00	12
Valid votes	381,598	96.98	
Invalid/blank votes	11,867	3.02	
Total votes	393,465	100.00	
Registered voters/turnout	533,844	73.70	
Source: National Electoral Commission
