= New Democracy – Yes =

Polish political party

New Democracy – Yes Nowa Demokracja TAK
- Abbreviation: ND–T
- Leader: Marek Materek (May 2023 – January 2024); Piotr Chmielowski (January 2024 – June 2026)
- Founded: May 2023
- Headquarters: ul. Długa 1 43-190 Mikołów
- Membership (2023): 450
- Ideology: Social democracy Regionalism; Localism; Decentralization
- Political position: Centre-left to left-wing
- Colours: Blue
- Sejm: 0 / 460
- Senate: 0 / 100
- European Parliament: 0 / 51
- Regional assemblies: 0 / 552
- City presidents: 1 / 117

Website
- nowademokracja.org

New Democracy – Yes (Polish: Nowa Demokracja TAK, ND–T) is a progressive political movement in Poland formed by Marek Materek, the president of Starachowice formerly associated with the Civic Platform and Polish People's Party. The party campaigns on breaking the Polish political "duopoly" of the United Right and Civic Coalition and wishes to appeal to undecided voters and those who would not vote otherwise. The party focuses on reforming and decentralising the Polish administration while supporting regional movements and autonomy proposals, and is composed of local mayors and regional activists. The party is highly critical of the ruling Law and Justice (PiS) party for causing the Polish constitutional crisis, and wishes to restore "the real dimension of democracy" in Poland.

The party mainly campaigns and appeals to local politicians such as mayors, councillors and city mayors, as well as regional activists, promising local and welfare reform. Alongside local activists, the party mainly unites politicians formerly associated with left-wing parties such as the Democratic Left Alliance and Your Movement. The party has a left-wing political outlook and aligns with the opposition parties such as Civic Platform and Poland 2050, and the leader of the party offered a joint anti-PiS list for the Polish Senate. In June 2023, the party entered a coalition with the agrarian socialist movement AGROunion. The new coalition focuses on issues such as welfare reform, construction of rental housing, free public transport, reduction of food prices, and empowering Polish regions. On 16 September 2023, the coalition of New Democracy – Yes and AGROunia officially ended as AGROunia joined the Civic Coalition.

== History ==
The party was founded by Marek Materek, a local Civic Platform politician of Starachowice. In 2014, Materek was expelled from the Civic Platform, and formed his own political movement called the Marek Materek Committee, which participated in the local election. In 2014, Materek was elected as a mayor of Starachowice and became one of the youngest local politicians in the history of Poland, being only 25 at the time. Materek was re-elected in 2018, winning the election with a margin of 84.4%.

In 2022, members of the Marek Materek Committee were critical of a demonstration against the Russian ambassador to Poland, Sergey Andreyev, who was doused with red paint by demonstrators in front of the Mausoleum of Soviet Soldiers in Warsaw on 9 May 2022. The grouping criticsed Polish authorities and called the Andreyev incident a "scandal". The committee was joined by new members such as councillors, mayors, lawyers and entrepreneurs. One of the politicians who joined Materek's movement was Piotr Chmielowski, who was a member of the Palikot Movement and then the Democratic Left Alliance. Other prominent figures in the movement are parliamentarian Maciej Banaszak, who was elected to the Sejm from the Palikot Movement list, and Argur Górczyński, a former left-wing politician.

The Marek Materek Committee began expanding its area of operation beyond Starachowice and reached out to local government officials and community workers from other cities and municipalities in the Świętokrzyskie Voivodeship. By 2023, the movement had spread to other voivodeships and was officially registered as a political party in 2023. On 30 June 2023, Michał Kołodziejczak and the president of the New Democracy – YES party Marek Materek (mayor of Starachowice) announced plans to form a coalition and run under the party banner "Social Movement AGROunia YES" in the parliamentary elections in the same year. A week earlier at the congress in connection with these plans, the name was adopted by the existing Social Movement party.

On 16 August 2023, the Social Movement coalition of AGROunia and New Democracy Yes officially disbanded. AGROunia joined the Civic Coalition instead under the leadership of Donald Tusk and his Civic Platform party. When asked about his decision, the leader of AGROunia, Michał Kołodziejczak, explained that joining the Civic Coalition was necessary in order to prevent vote splitting and ensure defeat of the United Right government. Kołodziejczak stated: "I believe in it and I will do everything: we will win, we will take back the countryside". In response, Marek Materek and New Democracy Yes posted a statement announcing that they will not be joining the Civic Coalition together with AGROunia and decided to end their cooperation with Kołodziejczak and his party instead.

In August, Marek Materek bitterly attacked his former coalition partner AGROunia, stating that he was not informed of this decision and had to find out about AGROunia's entrance into the Civic Coalition from the media. According to Materek, the sudden collapse of his coalition means that there is very little time left for New Democracy – Yes to gather enough signatures to participate in the following Sejm election. The Social Movement AGROunia Yes collected around 10.000 signatures in a few days, but the dissolution of this coalition rendered these signatures invalid. In addition, the party of Marek Materek invested a lot into the election committee of the former coalition, with Marek Materek himself paying 50.000 PLN. Materek announced that he is seeking joining the Third Way, as the party tried to join the coalition before, but Polska 2050 did not agree to the presence of AGROunia in the Third Way. Should coalition talks with the Third Way fail, New Democracy – Yes will commit itself to local governments and local elections instead.

In late August, New Democracy – Yes was joined by several former members of the New Left such as Beata Maciejewska. Maciejewska stated that her views did not change, and she wishes to continue the fight for "feminism, affordable rental housing, free public transport and sustainable development". New Democracy – Yes decided that it would only contest Senate seats, as there was not enough time left for gathering enough signatures to enter race for the Sejm, given the abrupt end to the party's erstwhile coalition with AGROunia. Maciejewska will contest the Senate District No. 66. The party also fielded candidates in the Lubelskie, Świętokrzyskie, Małopolskie, Dolnośląskie voivodeships.

In the 2023 Polish parliamentary election, the party contested 5 Senate seats in the Lubelskie, Świętokrzyskie, Małopolskie, Dolnośląskie and Wielkopolskie voivodeships. However, the party only won 95.691 votes in total, which amounted to 0.45% of the popular vote. The party performed the best in Świętokrzyskie, where the party leader Marek Materek won 6.76% of the popular vote. The former coalition partner of the party, AGROunia, entered the Sejm by running as a part of the Civic Coalition. Trying to win a Senate seat, Materek won 44.543 votes, which amounted to 24% of the vote in the electoral district; he came third behind Jarosław Rusiecki of Law and Justice (80.763 votes) and Piotr Diasos of the Senate Pact 2023 (60.403 votes). One of the few party candidates for the Senate, Patryk Hałaczkiewicz, dropped out and endorsed the Senate Pact candidate, arguing that his candidacy would mean splitting the vote in favor of the ruling Law and Justice. Senate Pact praised Hałackiewicz, stating: "No democratic party puts up Senate candidates against each other. We regard the resignation of Patrick Halczkiewicz as the voice of reason. We are from different political backgrounds and we know that the fight for Poland is the most important good".

Because the party failed to cross the electoral threshold of 3%, it was not entitled to reimbursement of election campaign expenses from the state budget. Because of that, New Democracy – Yes had to cover its campaign expenses which amounted to 100.000 PLN. The party assured that despite the lack of reimbursement, the party is in a stable financial situation and was prepared to take it risk. Marek Materek also stated that despite the party's failure to win a seat, he deeply believes that "there is space to be developed between the two blocs" and that many of his supporters and donors assured that they would be willing to support his party in the future. The party stated that it will now be preparing for the 2024 Polish regional assembly election, hoping to win seats in regional assemblies.

For the 2024 Polish local elections, the party registered an electoral committee "Voters' Election Committee of Marek Materek 2024" (Polish: Komitet Wyborczy Wyborców Marka Materka 2024). Through the electoral committee, Marek Materek sought to secure his third term of the president of Starachowice. The committee also fielded 50 other candidates for the council of Starachowice County. On 19 January 2024, Marek Materek announced that he is resigning from nationwide political activity and named Piotr Chmielowski the new leader of the party. Materek stated that he wants to focus solely on local matters in his native Starachowice. Ultimately, Materek was re-elected with 66.05% of the vote in the first round, with his electoral committee winning 13 seats out of 23 in the Starachowice City Council, narrowly securing an independent majority.

On 28 June 2026, Piotr Chmielowski, the leader of the party, died.

== Election results ==
=== Senate ===
Election	Votes	%	Seats	Change	Government
2023	95.691	0.45 (#10)	0 / 460	Steady	Extra-parliamentary

=== European Parliament ===
Election	Leader	Votes	%	Seats	+/−	EP Group
2024	Marek Materek	108,926	0.93 (#6)	0 / 53	New	−
2024	As part of the party list of Bezpartyjni Samorządowcy, that didn't win any seat.					

== Program ==
The stated goal of the party is to attract hitherto apathetic voters to the polls and promote an alternative to major Polish parties, which the movement criticises for ignoring grassroot movements and local problems. The leader of the party, Marek Materek, stated that he wants to restore the trust of Polish government amongst voters and promote local interests instead of national ones. Explaining his decision to form a (now disbanded) coalition with agrarian socialist AGROunia, Materek listed localism and new housing as main points of the coalition, stating: "We reiterate that politics starts from the very bottom, from local government officials. AGROunia has always solved the problems that are closest to the people. Today we can see how much has gone wrong in Poland after 35 years, after changes and economic transformation. The construction industry is currently in decay, and we ensure that a lot of rental housing can be built to serve at the beginning of every young person's journey."

New Democracy – Yes considers Polish local governments to be underfunded and wants teachers' salaries to be fully covered by the state budget, and to fully devolve the maintenance of the educational units to local authorities instead, which should "guarantee a relatively fair operation from a financial point of view". The party also wants to introduce an in vitro programme, and to further increase benefits for families with children. Marek Materek heavily promotes state-owned and communal housing, and wants to implement a nationwide socialised housing program; according to Materek, such programs currently cannot be implemented at a local level due to underfunded self-governments, which often forces local governments to cut the budget in order to provide communical housing. The party believes that modernisation is the solution to the country's energy crisis and wants to implement local-scale programs such as replaced street lamps with energy-efficient alternatives, thermal modernisation of all public facilities, and modernising heating plants.

The party criticised the current welfare system as insufficient and hostile to disabled persons, and believes that "it is the state's task to create conditions that will allow everyone to live with dignity and value". According to its program, New Democracy – Yes strives for "egalitarian outcomes" and wants to reform the Polish economic system in order to curb inequality and make welfare services more accessible. The party supports a welfare state and wants to create a list of guaranteed health and social services that will be less conditional and more accessible; the party criticised the current healthcare system as too centralised, and wants to devolve the ownership and administration of hospital and health services to municipal and provincial governments.

Unlike the Lewica coalition but similarly to the ND's former left-wing political partner AGROunia, the party has a conciliatory stance towards the Catholic Church. Marek Materek stated his intention to maintain "healthy relations" with the Catholic Church and to maintain religious education. New Democracy – Yes declared that the Church should play an important role in the Polish society, and it should be financed by tax deduction. While asserting his intention to maintain an assertive and respected Church, Materek also warned that "too much intermingling of Church and politics serves neither the Church nor the Polish state well".

In 2023, the party revealed its political program. The program consists of the following 23 points:

- Simplified tax system;
- Disability-friendly state;
- Nationwide in vitro programme;
- Direct election of local governments;
- Abolition of political districts;
- Single-mandate constituencies for municipal councils;
- Reducing the number of councillors by 1/3;
- Free public transport;
- Legal abortion in case of rape, danger to mother's health or fetal abnormality; restoring the abortion law before the ruling which led to 2020–2021 women's strike protests in Poland;
- Separation of the functions of Prosecutor General from the Minister of Justice;
- Abolition of education boards;
- Implementation of a "Local Investment Programme" for educational establishments;
- Houses and blocks of flats as mini power stations;
- Construction of affordable and accessible housing;
- Environmental and ecological education;
- Regeneration and thermal modernisation;
- Reinforcing national security;
- Empowering independent public media;
- Strict animal rights and animal welfare policies;
- Digitisation of public services;
- Implementing "citizen-friendly state";
- Subsidised psychiatry for children and young people;
- Open and "ideology-free" schools

== See also ==
- AGROunion
- Democratic Left Alliance
- Your Movement
- Polish Initiative
