= AGROunia =

Agrarian socialist movement in Poland

AGROunion AGROunia
- Abbreviation: AU
- Leader: Michał Kołodziejczak
- Founded: July 2018
- Registered: No
- Split from: Law and Justice
- Preceded by: Vegetable-Potato Union
- Headquarters: ul. Leśna 5A 98-200 Sieradz
- Membership (2019): 30,000
- Ideology: Agrarian socialism Catholic socialism Social democracy Economic nationalism Left-wing nationalism Protectionism; Economic patriotism Green politics
- Political position: Left-wing
- Religion: Roman Catholic
- National affiliation: Civic Coalition
- Colours: Green; Yellow
- Slogan: "Feeds, builds and protects" Polish: Żywi, buduje i broni
- Anthem: Jak noc i świt
- Sejm: 1 / 460
- Senate: 0 / 100
- European Parliament: 0 / 53
- Regional assemblies: 0 / 552
- City presidents: 0 / 117

Website
- agrounia.pl
- Politics of Poland; Political parties; Elections; Social Movement Agrounia YES Website; Vegetable-Potato Union website a: It was registered as a political party in March 2022, but it was deregistered on 8 January 2025. AGROunia continues to exist as a political movement.

The AGROunion (Polish: AGROunia, AU) is a left-wing agrarian socialist political movement in Poland formed by Michał Kołodziejczak. AGROunia criticizes the actions of current politicians in relation to the state of agriculture in Poland and organizes agricultural protests and information campaigns. The party declares to be built on agrarian socialist ideals and to have taken inspiration from the left-wing nationalist Samoobrona movement, Fighting Solidarity, as well as pre-war agrarian movements such as Polish People's Party "Wyzwolenie". Officially registered in 2022, the party became a socialist party with agrarian and Catholic overtones, with the leader of the party stating in 2022 that "faith, tradition, and Saint Mary herself are all elements of socialism for me". The party denies the labels of populism and nationalism.

AGROunia first entered Polish politics in 2018 as a social movement and a trade union, and became famous for its high-profile protest actions. AGROunia's activists blocked roads, scattered apples and threw pig carcasses. The main demands of the protests included trade protectionism and price control of agricultural products. The movement was considered conservative and had ties with right-wing agrarian groups, but did not participate in the 2019 election. In 2021, AGROunia became a political party and embraced left-wing ideology: the party invited several left-wing activists to its congress, and a socialist, Jan Zygmuntowski, was chosen to formulate AGROunia's economic program, which included breaking up monopolies, construction of additional housing and wage increases. In February 2023, AGROunia entered a coalition with liberal-conservative Porozumienie, considered the liberal wing of the United Right. The coalition was dissolved in May 2023, and in June 2023 AGROunia entered a coalition with a left-wing regionalist party Nowa Demokracja - Tak instead.

In the 2023 Polish parliamentary elections, AGROunia candidates competed on KO's lists. This pushed the party's hitherto ambiguous stance on social issues in a liberal direction: in August 2023, AGROunia stated its support for abortion on demand up to the 12th week of pregnancy. The party moved to advocate for legal recognition of same-sex partnerships, and expressed its belief that Poland needs to transition to renewable energy, although it stressed the need to protect the poorest parts of the society from transition costs first. In January 2025, the political parties functioning under AGROunia were deregistered, leaving the movement with no formal party, although the movement argues that "the parties within AGROunia were established for formal reasons and their deregistration changes nothing in practice".

== History ==
=== Origins ===
Michał Kołodziejczak, born in 1988, is a farmer who was elected in 2014 to the Błaszki municipal council as a Law and Justice candidate. He was expelled from the party in 2015 for organizing protests. Excluded from the party during his term of office, Kołodziejczak created the "Vegetable-Potato Union" (Polish: Unia Warzywno-Ziemniaczana) in 2018, which organized protests against the government's policy of culling pigs to fight the African swine fever virus. The movement was initially strictly agrarian and dealt with farmer issues only, but it soon started expanding into blue-collar and trade union environments as well. First demands of the movement included a change of the minister of agriculture, changes in grain imports, the alignment of European Union subsidies to the level of Western Europe and normalization of diplomatic relations with Russia.

Soon afterwards, on 7 December, the AGROunia association was established. AGROunia already attracted media attention in March 2019, when it organized a farmers' protest in Warsaw. The protest was caused by the poor situation of Polish farmers due to several factors - the prolonged consequences of sanctions imposed on Russia, the African swine fever epidemic and the government's belated response to it, as well as the change of the Minister of Agriculture in 2018. There was also the issue of persisting drought that limited harvests, caused by the 2018 European heatwave. The protest was spontaneous and caused public disorder, disrupting traffic and blockading the roadways. The protests intensified after a few days, something that Michał Kołodziejczak attributed to the indifference of the authorities regarding the demands of the protesters.

AGROunia maximized the attention that the protest attracted by wearing the vests used by the Yellow vests protests, burning tires and dumping grain and pig carcasses - elements that drew extensive media coverage and caused AGROunia to be compared to the far-left Self-Defence of the Republic of Poland (Samoobrona). The party also presented demands similar to the ones once put forward by Samoobrona, such as demanding a law that would oblige stores to supply at least 50% of their agricultural products from local farmers, graphic labeling of food products with the flag of country's origin, negotiating an end to the Russian embargo on Polish fruits and vegetables, giving more autonomy to rural self-governments, reforming chambers of agriculture, and more state intervention in the agricultural market.

=== Consolidation into a party ===
The demands and policies of AGROunia grew more radical as it transformed itself into a political party and organized more protests. AGROunia also started discussing the problems of land ownership, especially in context of income inquality in the Polish countryside and the domination of large landowners. The party also expanded its rhetoric - Kołodziejczak declared the initiation of a "community of farmers and consumers", arguing that AGROunia is not only for farmers, but for the disadvantaged and dissatisfied people at large.

AGROunia accentuated that high prices are dictated by large retailers rather than by farmers, and argued that this problem could be solved by extensive regulation and stave intervention, together with restructurization of the Polish economy that would empower local producers and give people more control over production. The party also started to call their protests "peasant uprisings" (Polish: chłopskie powstania) and made references to the traditions of the Polish peasant movement. In September 2019 the party drew more attention by exposing that apples imported to Poland are labelled as Polish to dupe the customers. In addition to campaigning on the issue of "food sovereignty", the party also focused on ecology and social justice, which was noted as "green leftist" discourse by the media.

Kołodziejczak started expanding his political connections by forming sister parties and associating himself with already existing ones. In June 2019, Michał Kołodziejczak announced the formation of the political party Prawda. On 25 July that year, the hitherto PolExit party (led by Stanisław Żółtek, at the same time the president of the Congress of the New Right) was re-registered as Zgoda, under which name Michał Kołodziejczak eventually decided to form the formation, but did not formally become a member and in mid-August withdrew from the project (in January 2020 the party rebranded itself as PolExit). In May 2021, Michał Kołojedziejczak announced the formation of a party under the name AGROunia. An application for its registration was filed in August of the same year, and the court registered the party on 3 March 2022.

=== First party congress ===
In 2021, the organization blocked roads and organized farmers' protests, demanding a change in government policy towards agriculture. On 4 December 2021, a congress of AGROunia was held, where the most important demands were presented. The congress hosted feminist activist Maja Staśko, left-wing activists Piotr Ikonowicz and Jan Śpiewak, as well as representatives of pro-Russian circles linked to the former Change formation Mateusz Piskorski and the editor of the communist website 1maja.info Mateusz Cichocki. In August 2022, Kołodziejczak stated that AGROunia is not a pro-Russian party, and denied any ties with the far-right Confederation Liberty and Independence. After the Russian invasion of Ukraine in 2022 AGROunia worked to close the border with Russia and Belarus and advocated the immediate imposition of an embargo on Russia.

The party also presented its anthem, Jak noc i świt (Polish: Like night and dawn), composed by Polish musician and composer Michał Wiśniewski. Polityka noted a similarity between AGROunia's anthem and the one of Samoobrona, Ten kraj jest nasz i wasz (Polish: This country is ours and yours). AGROunia stylized itself as the second Samoobrona, relying on similar political environments and similar forms of disruptive farmer protests. Together with the party's extensive connections with trade unions and presence of socialist activists in the convention, Polityka argued that AGROunia clearly evokes the "agrarian left" alignment of Samoobrona. Commenting on the party's convention, journalist Piotr Trudnowski wrote: "The main impression after the convention is that AGROunia is the new Samoobrona, and that Michał Kołodziejczak is the new Andrzej Lepper."

Starting in 2022, the party had been actively supporting and organising trade unions. In May 2022, AGROunia created its own trade union called AgroUnia Pracownicza (Workers' AGROunion), which unionised urban workers of big companies such as Amazon (company) and Biedronka. In June 2022, AGROunia announced the incorporation of farmers' and workers' unions into its party structure, and in October 2022, the party co-founded a national farmer union called Polish Agricultural Union. The leader of the party Michał Kołodziejczak argued that Polish farmers need a strong cooperatinve and envisioned a creation of a nationwide large farmer union that would include 100.000 Polish farmers. Kołodziejczak accused Law and Justice of predatory policies that seek to undermine independent trade unions and farmer unions in Poland.

=== Coalition talks ===
On 7 February 2023, Michał Kołodziejczak, and the president of the Porozumienie party, MP Magdalena Sroka, announced the intention of AGROunia and Porozumienie to set up a joint federation political party. On 15 March of the same year, it was registered by the District Court in Warsaw under the name Social Movement, following an application filed by Agrounia leaders (including Michał Kołodziejczak as president) in January of that year. On 24 April, also at the request of AGROunia activists, the Stabilna Polska party was further registered (in case of formal problems with the Social Movement party), with Grzegorz Domagała as president. On 23 May 2023, it was announced that the cooperation between AGROunia and Porozumienie had ended. Magdalena Sroka of Porozumienie cited the left-wing orientation of AGROunia, and the fact that its program was to be developed by the socialist economist Jan Zygmuntowski, as the main reasons for ending the coalition.

On 5 June of the same year, at an extraordinary national congress of the AGROunia party, a resolution was adopted to change its name to Polska Praworządna (the court registered this name three weeks later), with Piotr Kołodziejczak (Michał Kołodziejczak's cousin) as its new president. In addition, on 19 June, a fourth party established by AGROunia activists was registered, under the name Social Interest. Its president was Mateusz Piepiórka. On 30 June 2023, Michał Kołodziejczak and the president of the New Democracy - YES party Marek Materek (mayor of Starachowice) announced plans to form a coalition and run under the party banner "Social Movement Agrounia YES" in the parliamentary elections in the same year. A week earlier at the congress in connection with these plans, the name was adopted by the existing Social Movement party.

In early August 2023, following the decision of Polish People's Party to form a coalition Third Way with Poland 2050, the concept of an agrarian coalition between the PSL and AGROunia was no longer available. AGROunia entered coalition negotiations with the left-wing nationalist Samoobrona movement instead. On 5 August 2023, the 12th anniversary of Andrzej Lepper's death, Samoobrona activists met together with Kołodziejczak and laid flowers on Lepper's grave. Samoobrona activists and AGROunia announced that they will be running together in the 2023 Polish parliamentary election, with Samoobrona representatives occupying leading positions on the electoral list. Kołodziejczak expressed his respect for Andrzej Lepper and his movement, stating: "He served Poland when many served only themselves and big business. He was with us, true to principle, in a world full of iniquity and betrayal".

=== In Civic Coalition ===
On 16 August 2023, AGROunia announced its cooperation with the Civic Coalition under the leadership of Donald Tusk and his Civic Platform. The alliance was formally announced during the National Council meeting of the Civic Platform, which approved and published the lists of the Civic Coalition for the Sejm and the Senate. During the meeting, Donald Tusk stated that AGROunia will run in the 2023 Polish parliamentary election together with the Civic Coalition. This decision shocked political pundits, given AGROunia's aspiration to be a spiritual successor of Andrzej Lepper's Samoobrona. Polish political scientist Rafał Chwedoruk praised this decision, arguing that a coalition with AGROunia will help the Civic Platform appeal to rural voters, who hitherto considered the party elitist and urban-centric. Kołodziejczak argued that the coalition is necessary to prevent vote splitting and to ensure the defeat of the United Right government; Kołodziejczak stated: "No vote must go to waste, and we must show everyone in Poland that, despite our different views, we are looking in one direction - towards a future Poland that will be strong, rich and here people will build it together. This is what I am here for, I believe in it and I will do everything: we will win with PiS, we will take back the countryside from PiS". The former coalition partner of AGROunia, New Democracy - Yes, announced that it will not be joining the Civic Coalition itself and decided to end its cooperation with AGROunia.

At the end of August 2023, a scandal broke out within Civic Coalition that AGROunia belongs to - Roman Giertych, the leader of the League of Polish Families, was invited to the electoral list of the coalition. The League of Polish Families is a far-right National Catholic party based on right-wing populism and the concept of "national solidarism", which it defines as "the introduction of a state system based on consistently applied Christian morality; its principles would lead to the spiritual renewal of society and the elimination of all forms of pathology in social life - corruption and crime, bureaucracy and mass abortions". The decision to include Giertych in the coalition was made exclusively by Donald Tusk, and was not consulted with other members of the coalition. However, Tusk promised earlier that every Civic Coalition candidate would need to support abortion on demand up to the 12th week of pregnancy. As a result, several Civic Coalition MPs demanded that Giertych, hitherto a far-right pro-life politician, change his views on abortion if he is to stand as a candidate on the KO list. Giertych replied that he will not change his stance, but conceded that "not every abortion needs to be criminalised".

The leader of AGROunia who is also to run with the Civic Coalition, a Catholic socialist Michał Kołodziejczak, was given the same demand as he also used to be pro-life. During feminist Black Protests in Poland, Kołodziejczak stated: "Killing unborn children is a grave sin and we understand that as Catholics, and people who are not Catholics need to understand that it is inflicting suffering on unborn beings who are defending themselves against murder". However, Kołodziejczak accepted this demand and changed his stance on abortion, stating in August 2023: "What I would really like is for the women who live here to agree among themselves on what women's rights should look like (...) I see different people in Poland today. My view is not like the one of Jarosław Kaczyński and Law and Justice. What are they saying? They are saying that everyone in Poland is to be the same (...) We should draft the right bill, the right provisions, we will know the opinion of women - which is a priority for me in this matter - and then rest assured, I will give the women my seal of approval and I will vote as they wish". However, Kołodziejczak insists that his new view is not incompatible with his previous one. He described himself as a "conservative Catholic with a liberal approach" on this issue.

=== 2023 election and campaign ===
In September 2023, the president of the Civic Coalition, Donald Tusk, and the head of AGROunia, Michał Kołodziejczak, announced a fight to extend the ban on Ukrainian grain imports. They sent a letter to the head of the European Parliament Roberta Metsola on this issue. It was also announced that Kołodziejczak is due to visit Brussels; Kołodziejczak stated that he wishes to take on the task of finding an agreement with the European Union on the issue on Ukrainian grain, hoping to prolong and extend the protectionist legislation that would help protect the Polish agricultural market. AGROunia leader stressed his belief that Poland can come to an agreement with the EU on this issue, despite the failure of Janusz Wojciechowski, the EU Commissioner for Agriculture, to do so. Announcing his plan to meet EU authorities in Brussels, Kołodziejczak stated: "I will prove that it is possible to talk to the European Union in a normal, civilised way, but on firm terms, without building up conflicts". AGROunia also announced its intention to extend current protectionist measures for Polish agriculture together with Civic Coalition - import ban is to be extended to dairy, eggs, chicken, honey, vegetables and soft fruits as well.

On 9 September 2023, the Civic Coalition organised program congress of the coalition under the slogan "100 concretes for 100 days", where Michał Kołodziejczak presented the program for Polish farmers on behalf of both AGROunia and the Civic Coalition. Kołodziejczak announced that the coalition would create a Stabilisation Fund, which would protect Polish farmers from fraud. Should a company fail to pay a farmer for delivered products on time, the Stabilisation Fund would make payment to the farmer on behalf on the state and then proceed to persecute the liable company for non-payment. Kołodziejczak argues that companies often fail to pay for agricultural products in Poland, forcing farmers and food producers to go to court, which can drag out the time of payment even further or result in non-payment, further disempowering Polish farmers.

In the 2023 Polish parliamentary election, Kołodziejczak ran on the Civic Coalition list in the Konin district. He won 44.062 votes out of 100.580 cast for the Civic Coalition in the district. He received the second highest number of votes, while the frontrunner of the Law and Justice election list, Zbigniew Hoffmann, won 47.594 votes. Kołodziejczak became one of two Civic Coalition candidates to win a seat in the district.

On 20 December 2023, Michał Kołodziejczak was nominated the Vice-Minister of Agriculture in the government of Civic Coalition, Poland 2050, Polish Coalition and New Left. While this decision was largely expected given Kołodziejczak's experience in agriculture, political commentators question the future of AGROunia which had its leader enter the government despite being an anti-establishment party. Kołodziejczak accepted the nomination but also stressed his disagreements with some of the government's plans, such as lifting the trade ban on Sundays.

=== In the government ===
In February 2024, the 2024 Polish farmers' protests started in Poland. Despite the fact that AGROunia is a part of the incumbent government (the party leader, Michał Kołodziejczak, is the Vice-Minister of Agriculture), the party decided to partake in protests. Members of the party appeared in 170 protests across Poland. Kołodziejczak defended his party and its presence in protests, stating that the European Union has been devastating to Polish agriculture, citing the European Green Deal and Common Agricultural Policy as particularly condemnable policies. Once the protests escalated following the decision of the European Union to extend its grain deal with Ukraine until June 2025, Kołodziejczak condemned the decision and stated that "AGROunia has every right to go out on the road today and protest". He also added that he understands the hostility amongst Polish farmers towards Polish government, despite being a part of it. In the 2024 Polish local elections, members of AGROunia ran on the lists of the Civic Coalition.

Later in 2024, the agrarian organizations in Poland became divided between those favoring reaching an agreement with Polish authorities and staunch opponents of negotiations. Opponents of negotiations believed that the concessions offered by the government were insufficient and denounced the negotiations as capitulation of the farmer movement. AGROunia signed an agreement with the government in Jesionka near Rzeszów, in which the Ministry of Agriculture pledged to stop the transit of embargoed agricultural products from Ukraine through Poland, include additional restrictions on other Ukrainian products such as cereal, oilseed rape, maize, sugar, poultry, eggs and fruits. In addition, grain sold between 1 January and 30 May is to be subsidised. In late March, Michał Kołodziejczak partook in talks with the Ukrainian authorities, sparking controversy by accusing the Ukrainian government of exploiting the war to justify unfair trade practices. Ukraine reportedly requested that Kołodziejczak be excluded from future talks, but this request was not answered by the Polish Ministry of Agriculture.

In November 2024, Kołodziejczak denounced the "chain law" (Polish: ustawa łańcuchowa), a civic bill project organized by 5 environmentalist organizations which collected 534 thousand signatures. Aiming at "protecting animals from pain and suffering", the bill proposes a ban on tethering dogs and using fireworks, as well as introducing new forms of pet population control. The project was fiercely opposed by Polish farmers, who criticize it as economically unsound and aiming at reducing animal husbandry in all forms in Poland. Agrarian protests were announced against the project. Kołodziejczak was particularly critical of the project's proposal to limit shelter workers' salaries to 1.5 times the national minimum wage, which he saw as anti-worker; he also noted that the project would increase the minimal size of pens for dogs to over 25 square meters, on which he commented: "In Warsaw, a pen of this size next to the Ministry of Agriculture costs PLN 800,000". Kołodziejczak called the Civic Coalition's candidate for the 2025 Polish presidential election, Rafał Trzaskowski, to take a position on this proposal.

Starting in December 2024, a dispute emerged between Kołodziejczak and the rest of the Ministry of Agriculture. Kołodziejczak criticized the government for inaction, failure to protect the farmers and bureucratization, claiming that he would dismiss one-third of the government's employees. Kołodziejczak's superior, Czesław Siekierski, reprimanded him for the attacks.

=== After 2024 ===
On 8 January 2025, the political party functioning under AGROunia, the AGROunia Social Movement (Polish: Ruch Społeczny Agrounia Tak, was deregistered as it failed to submit the financial report for 2023. Another party that functioned under AGROunia, Polska Praworządna, was deregistered earlier in November 2024 for the same reason. AGROunia technically still had two parties at its disposal, Stabilna Polska and Social Interest, but the leaders of these parties had since left AGROunia. Kołodziejczak argued that the political party of AGROunia was only founded for formal reasons, and its deregistration changes nothing for the movement in practice.

Later in January 2025, Kołodziejczak faced calls to resign after he was photographed holding a sign "We don't want human trash in Poland. No help for refugees". Later, Kołodziejczak stated that he is considering resigning given the inaction of the Ministry of Agriculture, adding that his role was reduced to that of a figurehead. Shortly before the 2025 Polish presidential election, he criticized his government's candidate Rafał Trzaskowski for failing to present any policies for farmers. However, he also appealed to the farmers to not vote for Karol Nawrocki, the candidate of Law and Justice. After the election, Kołodziejczak stated that he will resign unless the government implements agricultural policies and blamed the Third Way party for Trzaskowski's defeat, arguing that the party did not engage itself in the campaign. In June 2025, Kołodziejczak was accused of having bought his diploma at the Collegium Humanum – Warsaw Management University.

On 18 June 2025, Kołodziejczak left the government and resigned from his post in the Ministry of Agriculture, citing his disagreements with Siekelski and the rest of the government. In August, Kołodziejczak praised the Polish president Karol Nawrocki, and spoke positively of his decision to veto the government's bills. He announced his plans to further develop AGROunia. In November 2025, Kołodziejczak was the only MP of Civic Coalition to not support Włodzimierz Czarzasty's nomination for the Marshal of the Sejm.

== Program ==
=== Ideology ===
The party was described as agrarian, progressive, socialist and social democratic - it brings together in its circles mainly farmers with left-wing views. It was also compared to other left-wing parties - Łukasz Pawłowski, head of the Institute for Public Affairs Research, described AGROunia as a "rural Left Together. Several left-wing and socialist activists were present at the party convention, such as Maja Staśko and Piotr Ikonowicz. The leader of the party, Michał Kołodziejczak, described himself as a socialist, while stressing the Catholic and agrarian character of his socialist views.

Jan Zygmuntowski, a Marxist economist formerly associated with Left Together, composed the economic program of AGROunia. Zygmuntowski described himself as a socialist, and praised AGROunia for expressing "a real folk sentiment for rebellion, dissent, but with a higher class consciousness". Speaking of the economic postulates he wrote for AGROunia, Zygmuntowski emphasized anti-eviction actions and persecuting those responsible for reprivatization and its consequences in Poland. He said:

I have two things hanging on the wall. One is the coat of arms of communist Poland, the eagle without the crown. The free eagle as I say. The other is [an image of] Jolanta Brzeska, a lady who was in her fifties. Her house was supposed to be privatized by this mafia. She formed this association, the Warsaw Association of Tenants, and she was dragged from her home by this mafia. She was taken to one of the parks nearby Warsaw, Las Kabacki. And she was burned alive. And the police, which were investigating it, said that it was a suicide. That [...] she just burnt herself in the forest. So, for the majority of people in Poland, I would say, the rule of law never existed. The human rights were never respected. So, I don't know why I would ever go and defend judges, lawyers. [...] For democracy, we should start prosecuting people and we should start dismantling these institutions. We should have judges who are established by the people, not by their own hierarchic institution, which most of all defends its own interests.

Kołodziejczak was invited to the 2021 congress of The Left coalition; in a letter to the coalition, Kołodziejczak described AGROunia as "one of the more dynamically developing trade unions in Poland, established on the basis of an authentic people's movement" and wrote: "AGROunia will stand consistently for the people as a whole, especially the rural and provincial people. We will fight for its total subjectivity! For the rights of those living from hard work, for a republic of the free and equal. We stand for justice and self-sufficiency. We are all - and regardless of where we live or what our profession is - workers. At the forefront of all the working, exploited, cheated by those in power and corporations - for a prosperous Poland and genuine solidarity!" Kołodziejczak described AGROunia as "the true left, which represents the trade unions" and as a party heavily inspired by Andrzej Lepper and his left-wing nationalist and Christian socialist Samoobrona movement.

=== Goals ===
AGROunia's goal is to try to influence the government to pass their agrarian policies through protests. The organization is in favor of defending the domestic market and family farms. In addition, it wants Polish farmers to provide the country with food security and healthy food. Michał Kołodziejczak believes that it is important to take over the agricultural self-government - according to him, agricultural chambers are expensive and do not cause adequate development in agriculture, therefore they should be replaced by independent structures of farmers exerting an influence on the rulers. The farmers associated with the organization support the determination of the required number of Polish products in supermarkets and demand strict compliance with the standards of labeling food with the flag of origin. AGROunia generally supports the European Union and opposes potential Polexit, but believes that some of its policies are harmful to farmers and wants to curb the influence of foreign capital on Polish industries.

One of the stated goals of the party is to introduce a maximum age of candidacy, with plans to introduce a legislation that would force a Sejm deputy to retire if they are 65. The leader of the party, Michał Kołodziejczak, said that he is ready to amend the constitution to make such provision possible. The party also expressed support for ecology and environmentalism, pointing to high pollution of Polish rivers and vulnerability to drought. AGROunia also supports decentralisation and regionalism, and plans to decentralise state institutions away from Warsaw. The party also promotes economic patriotism and subsiding local farms and products. Kołodziejczak described his party as "people's social democratic", and denied that the party is populist, stating: "Let us not be told that AgroUnia is a populist party". He also stated that the party is not nationalist, clarifying that AGROunia advocates for economic patriotism and protectionism instead. The party has an unclear stance on social issues; the leader of the party opposes abortion and declared AGROunia's Roman Catholic orientation, but the party had also been partaking in renewable energy and feminist marches. However, Kołodziejczak changed his stance on abortion in August 2023, stating: "I would like to give people in Poland the freedom to decide. Today this is very important (...) I do not want to be a politician - and never will be - of anyone's conscience. I will never judge (...) Today I know that people in Poland are different." At the same time, Kołodziejczak assured that this change is compatible with the Catholic outlook of the party, describing himself as a "conservative Catholic with a liberal approach". Kołodziejczak also expressed support for legal recognition of same-sex unions in Poland, stating: "I will not be the man to violate anyone's conscience. I want to return freedom to people. If there are people who have different [sexual] orientations, why should I make it difficult for them?".

=== Relations with other left-wing movements ===
The party pledges to combat the economic and social exclusion that the rural population of Poland experiences. It points to underdeveloped rural transport infrastructure as well as insufficient access to healthcare there. AGROunia also warned that the increasing food prices heavily contribute to food insecurity among the poorest classes. AGROunia aims to introduce a legislation that would make it mandatory for food stores to have at least 70 % of their products come from Poland, and to decentralise strategic suppliers to prevent monopolies. AGROunia's program also includes provisions regarding the housing crisis - the party describes the housing shortage as one of the most important problems in Poland and attacks the Law and Justice government for inaction; AGROunia proposed introducing a law that would oblige housebilding companies to allocate 20% of newly built flats to local self-governments. Kołodziejczak stated that such law would be "for those who do not have housing, and not as it has been done for 30 years - for developers, for rich people who make money from building, renting and selling flats". The party also stresses the importance of trade unions and calls for the revival of unionisation culture in Poland. In 2021, Michał Kołodziejczak wrote:

AGROunia is one of the more dynamically developing trade unions in Poland, which was established on the basis of an authentic people's movement. I would like to take this opportunity to point out once again the difficult situation of employee representation, sectoral representation and the entire trade union movement in Poland, which limits the possibility of putting pressure on those in power and employers from large companies, especially those at the head of multinational corporations. According to the OECD, unionisation of workers in Poland is only 12.4%, which is less than the average of the 38 member countries of this organisation. Also the number of Polish workers covered by collective bargaining agreements compared to Europe is dramatically low. Trade unions in Poland have a negative image in society and do not teach Poles how to fight for their own - according to the Central Statistical Office, Poles' propensity to strike is also very low. Polish workers go on strike less often than citizens of Western European countries, but also "Koreans, famous for their subordination, exaggerated respect for hierarchy and superiors". This is a scandal! And all this is happening in a country founded on the myth of Solidarity! It is time to put an end to this fiction! It is time to take away the monopoly of those currently in power in Poland to disseminate the history and significance of the trade union movement.

Kołodziejczak stated that he seeks a realignment of the Polish left-wing movement, and expresse his belief that "food security should be one of the most urgent topics for the left; Food prices and access to quality products are the basis not only for preventive health care, but also for tackling qualitative and quantitative malnutrition". He criticised modern left for excessive secularism and accused it of losing touch with the trade union movements. In 2021, he stated: "we have a secular left in Poland, and we need a normal, real left that represents the trade unions, represents the workers and fights for their rights."

Media commentators observed that AGROunia wishes to build the "social left" in Poland. Kołodziejczak declared that the main aim of AGROunia is to rebuild the position of trade unions, stating: "My main goal is to rebuild trade unions in Poland and this is a political goal. Behind every serious opposition political party there should be trade unions. And today these unions are weak. The modern model of politics shows that social movements, trade unions and associations must work together with parties. Because if the parties do not have this social base, they are disconnected from the electorate". AGROunia is described as a new social protest party comparable to the left-wing Samoobrona party. Kołodziejczak listed high prices, lack of housing and the fact that "hard work does not equal a decent paycheck" as main social problems of modern Poland, which make a new Samoobrona-like coalition possible. Head of the Institute for Public Affairs Research Łukasz Pawłowski pointed at the left-wing character of AGROunia, describing it as "rural Left Together".

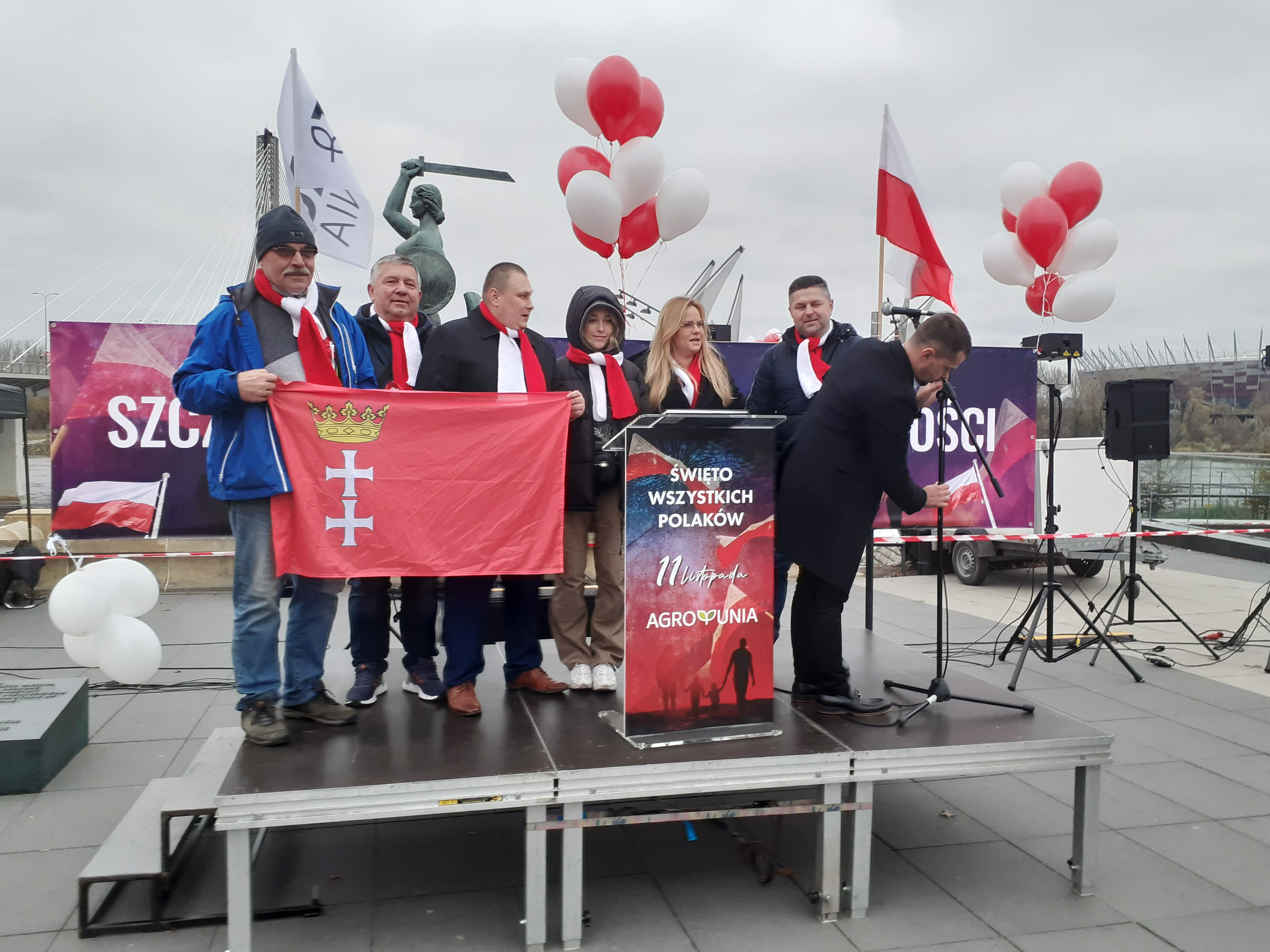
Independence Day celebrated by Agrounia in Warsaw in 2022.

=== Postulates ===
AGROunia specified its assumptions in the following postulates:

- Polish food as a priority in stores;
- Mandatory 70% share of Polish products in food stores;
- Accurate labeling of Polish food;
- Opposition to discrimination against Polish farmers in Europe;
- Prohibition of liquidating profitable branches of agriculture and breeding;
- Opposition to oligopolies and monopolies;
- Allocation of 20% of all newly built flats to local self-governments for communal use;
- The purchase of agricultural goods by the state and agricultural subsidies;
- Supporting drug liberalisation;
- Compulsory retirement of politicians after the age of 65;
- Decentralisation of Polish government administration, increased powers of local authorities and support for regional movements;
- Restriction of foreign ownership and foreign direct investment in Polish economy;
- Introduction of ecological programs such as the revitalisation of Polish rivers and forests;
- End of “exploitation by trade giants and the exploitation of ordinary people by supermarkets and corporations”.

=== Successor of Samoobrona ===
It has been compared to the Samoobrona movement led by Andrzej Lepper in the 2000s. It seeks to compete with the Polish People's Party, which under Władysław Kosiniak-Kamysz's leadership has moved away from its traditional agrarian base to economic liberalism and a "rational center". AGROunia became a left-wing alternative to hitherto right-oriented agrarianism, and announced that it would not enter coalition with centre-right parties such as Polish People's Party and Poland 2050; the party closely aligned itself with trade unions, farmer cooperatives and left-wing parties instead, and representatives of AGROunia were invited to the party convention of the New Left in 2021. Despite the party's agrarian ideology, AGROunia actively participates in ecological and environmentalist protests. Michał Kołodziejczak argues that both "miners and ecologists" can be united behind action against climate change and that environmentalist causes are aligned with the agrarian cause, and blames the government for inaction and deepening divisions. The politician responsible for the party's economic program, Jan Zygmuntowski, stated that he is a socialist and when asked about his membership of the party, arguing that AGROunia "expresses a real folk sentiment with higher class consciousness" and represents not only the interests of the farmers but also the working class at large.

Similarly to the rhetoric of Samoobrona movement, AGROunia also promotes anti-capitalism; in 2023, Kołodziejczak remarked: "If the current policy continues in Poland, we will soon have no property, but large corporations intertwined with politicians who, with the help of these corporations, will be present in all our lives and will make slaves of us". The party is also critical of the Balcerowicz Plan which transitioned Poland from a centrally-planned communist economy to a capitalist market one; AGROunia argues that while the capitalist transformation was touted as key to prosperity, it caused bankruptcy instead. Leader of AGROunia, Michał Kołodziejczak, stated: "I remember poverty, credit, collecting money from family because you had to pay back the credit, I remember Leszek Balcerowicz talking about the economic transformation, which pushed us into poverty for many years, but it was good for him, because who privatised Polmos for a few zlotys, factories, PGRs, tenement houses in the cities, blocks of flats, who privatised the health service?!" Kołodziejczak also expressed anti-EU sentiment, speaking of the Polish United Right government: "They have become vassals of the EU and have made Poland into an EU colony". Samoobrona was likewise known for its anti-Balcerowicz, anti-capitalist, Eurosceptic, and agrarian socialist rhetoric. Polish political scientists Daniel Matusiak and Michał Wenzel wrote that "AGROunia continues the model and actions of Samoobrona".

== Election results ==
=== Sejm ===
Election year	Leader	# of votes	% of vote	# of overall seats won	+/–	Government
2023	Michał Kołodziejczak	6,629,402	30.7 (#2)	1 / 460	New	
2023	Michał Kołodziejczak	6,629,402	30.7 (#2)	1 / 460	New	PiS Minority (2023)
2023	Michał Kołodziejczak	6,629,402	30.7 (#2)	1 / 460	New	KO–PL2050–PSL–NL (2023-2026)
2023	Michał Kołodziejczak	6,629,402	30.7 (#2)	1 / 460	New	KO–PSL–PL2050–C–NL (2026-present)
2023	As part of the Civic Coalition, which won 157 seats in total.					

=== Regional assemblies ===
Election year	% of vote	# of overall seats won	+/–
2024	30.6 (#2)	0 / 552	New
2024	As part of the Civic Coalition, which won 209 seats in total.		

== See also ==
- Self-Defence of the Republic of Poland
- Peasants' Party (Poland)
- New Democracy - Yes
- Polish People's Party
- Agreement (political party)
