= Piotr Chmielowski (politician) =

Polish politician (1965–2026)

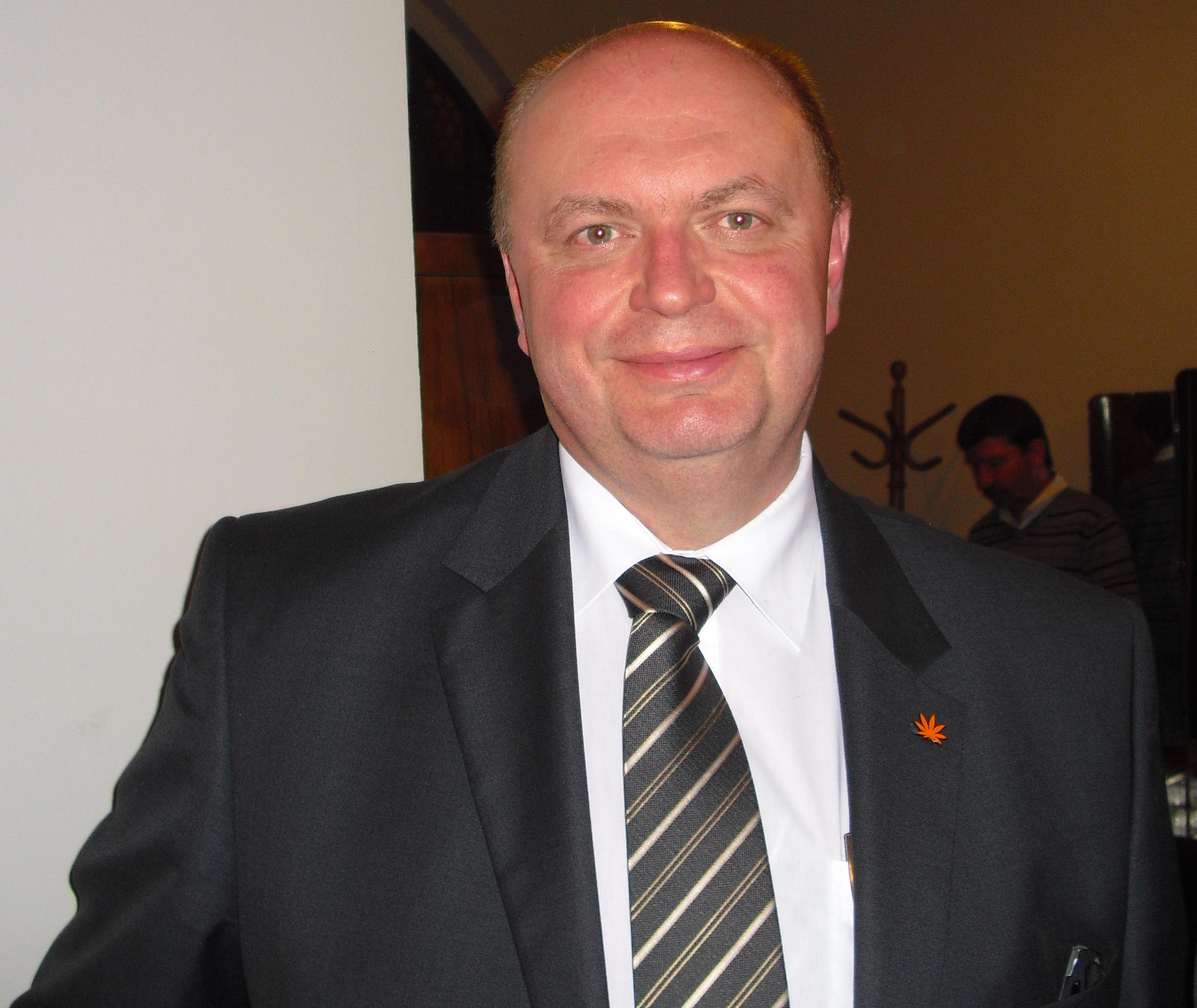
- Chmielowski in 2012

Member of the 7th Term Sejm
- In office 8 November 2011 – 11 November 2015
- Parliamentary group: Palikot's Movement (2011–2013); Democratic Left Alliance (2013–2015)
- Constituency: Sejm Constituency no. 30

Leader of New Democracy – Yes
- In office 19 January 2024 – 28 June 2026
- Preceded by: Marek Materek

Personal details
- Born: 27 April 1965 Chorzów, Poland
- Died: 28 June 2026 (aged 61)
- Party: Palikot's Movement (2011–2013); Democratic Left Alliance (2013–2016); New Democracy – Yes
- Education: Silesian University of Technology

Piotr Sylwester Chmielowski (27 April 1965 – 28 June 2026) was a Polish businessman and politician. He was a member of the 7th Term Sejm (2011–2015) and was the leader of New Democracy – Yes between 2024 and 2026.

== Life and career ==
Piotr Sylwester Chmielowski was born on 27 April 1965. He graduated in 1990 from the Faculty of Mechanical Engineering at the Silesian University of Technology, and also studied at the Polish Institute of International Affairs. In 1991, he set up his own business specialising in the distribution of medical devices. He became deputy editor-in-chief of a trade journal and, in 2001, vice-chairman of the board of the Association of Dental Manufacturers and Distributors.

In the 2011 Polish parliamentary election, he was elected to the Sejm, standing as the lead candidate on the Palikot's Movement list in the Rybnik constituency and receiving 9,925 votes. On 5 July 2013, he was suspended from the Palikot Movement's parliamentary group, and two days later he was expelled from it. On 3 September of the same year, the Palikot Movement announced that he had also been expelled from the party, and Piotr Chmielowski himself announced that he was joining the Democratic Left Alliance. A week later, he became a member of the SLD parliamentary group, and on 27 November of the same year, he also joined the party. He represented the SLD in the September 2014 Senate by-election in Rybnik, finishing in last place (4th) in the constituency.

In the 2015 Polish parliamentary election, he failed to secure re-election to the Sejm. In November 2016, he left the SLD. In 2020, he became chairman of the New Democracy – Yes party, formed following the re-registration of Przedsiębiorcza RP. He subsequently became involved with the Marek Materek Social Movement Association (Polish: Stowarzyszenie Ruch Społeczny im. Marka Materka). In 2023, he stepped down as leader of New Democracy – Yes in favour of Marek Materek; he became the party's secretary-general, and subsequently its vice-president. He became the leader of the party again on 19 January 2024 after Marek Materek resigned from the leadership.

Chmielowski died on 28 June 2026, at the age of 61.

== Election history ==
Electoral history of Piotr Chmielowski
Year	Body	Constituency	Party	Votes		Result	Ref.
Year	Body	Constituency	Party	Total	%	Result	Ref.
2011	Sejm	no. 30 (Rybnik)	Palikot's Movement	9,925	3.76	Won	
2014	Senate	no. 73 (Rybnik)	Democratic Left Alliance	922	4.02	Lost	
2015	Sejm	no. 30 (Rybnik)	United Left	979	0.34	Lost	
