= Krzysztof Gadowski =

Polish politician (born 1962)

Krzysztof Jan Gadowski
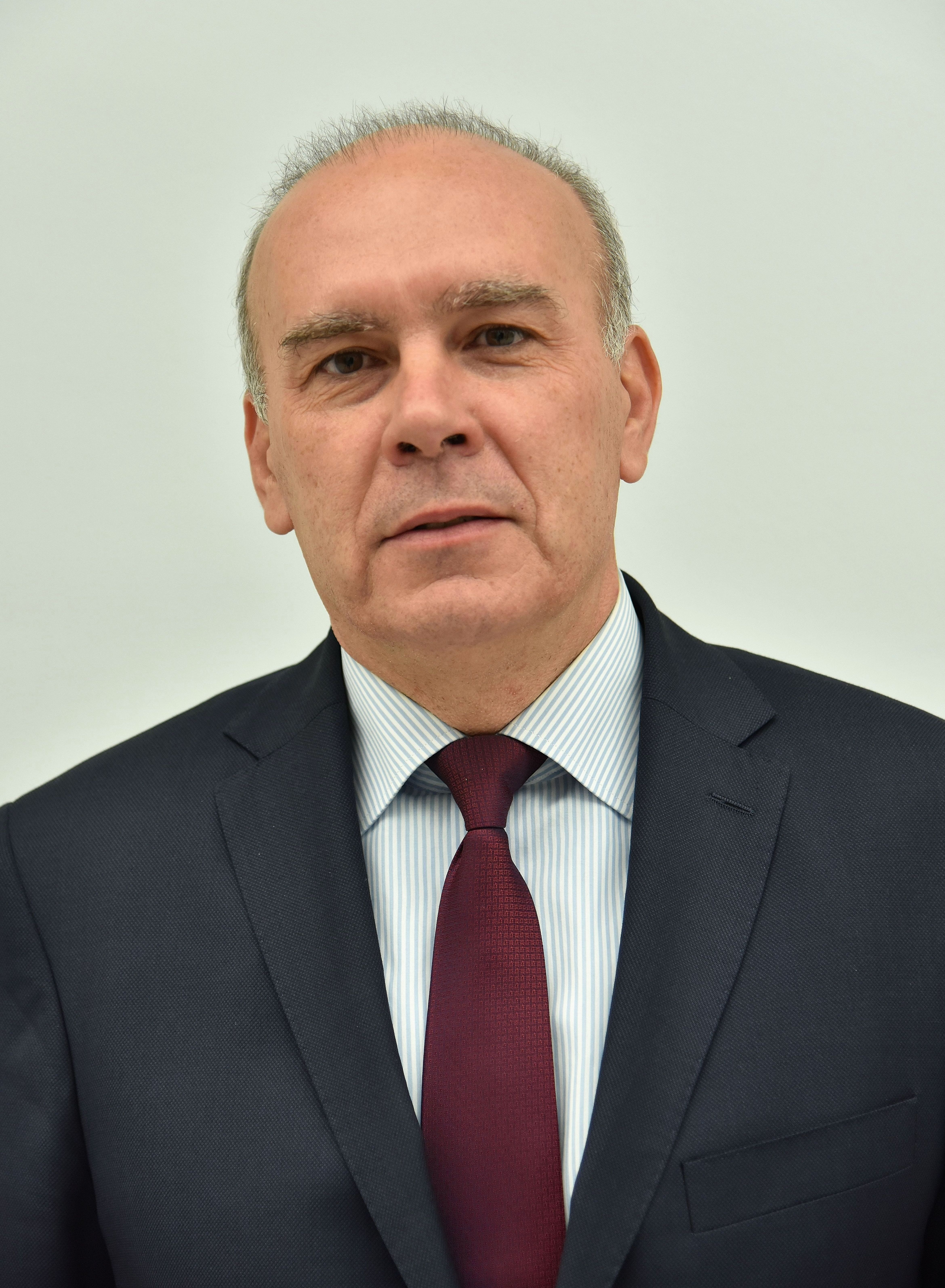

member of Sejm 2005-2007
- In office 25 September 2005 – ?

Personal details
- Born: 14 August 1962 (age 63)
- Party: Civic Platform

Krzysztof Jan Gadowski (born 14 August 1962 in Bochnia) is a Polish politician. He was elected to the Sejm on 25 September 2005, getting 7705 votes in 30 Rybnik district as a candidate from the Civic Platform list.

== See also ==
- Members of Polish Sejm 2005-2007
