= Gabriela Lenartowicz =

Polish politician (born 1960)

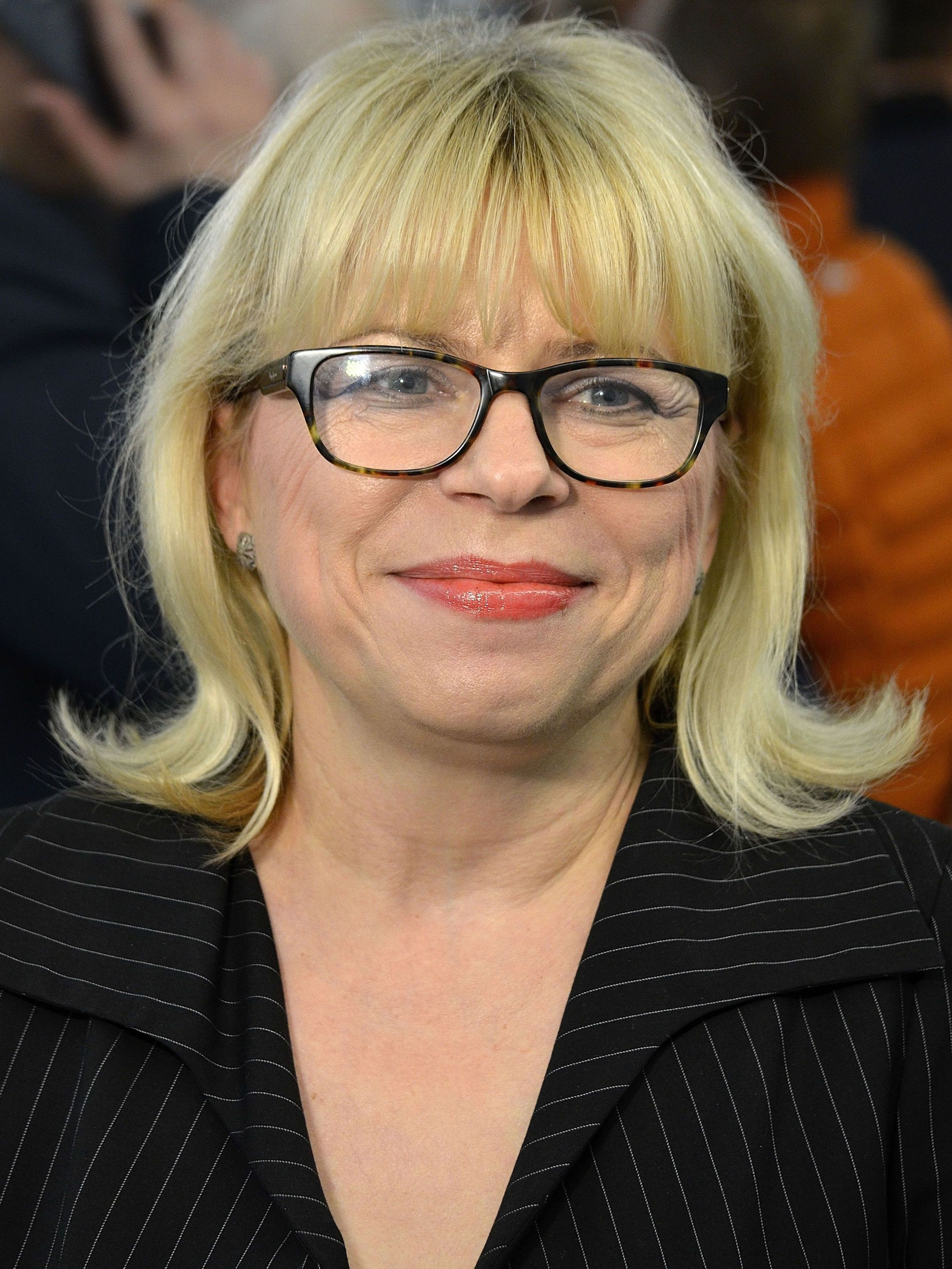

Member of the Sejm
- Incumbent
- Assumed office 2015

Personal details
- Born: 12 December 1960 (age 65)
- Party: Civic Platform

Gabriela Teresa Lenartowicz (born 12 December 1960) is a Polish politician. She was elected to the Sejm (9th term) representing the Bielsko-Biała II constituency. She previously also served in the 8th term of the Sejm (2015–2019).
