= Paweł Jabłoński =

Polish politician (born 1986)

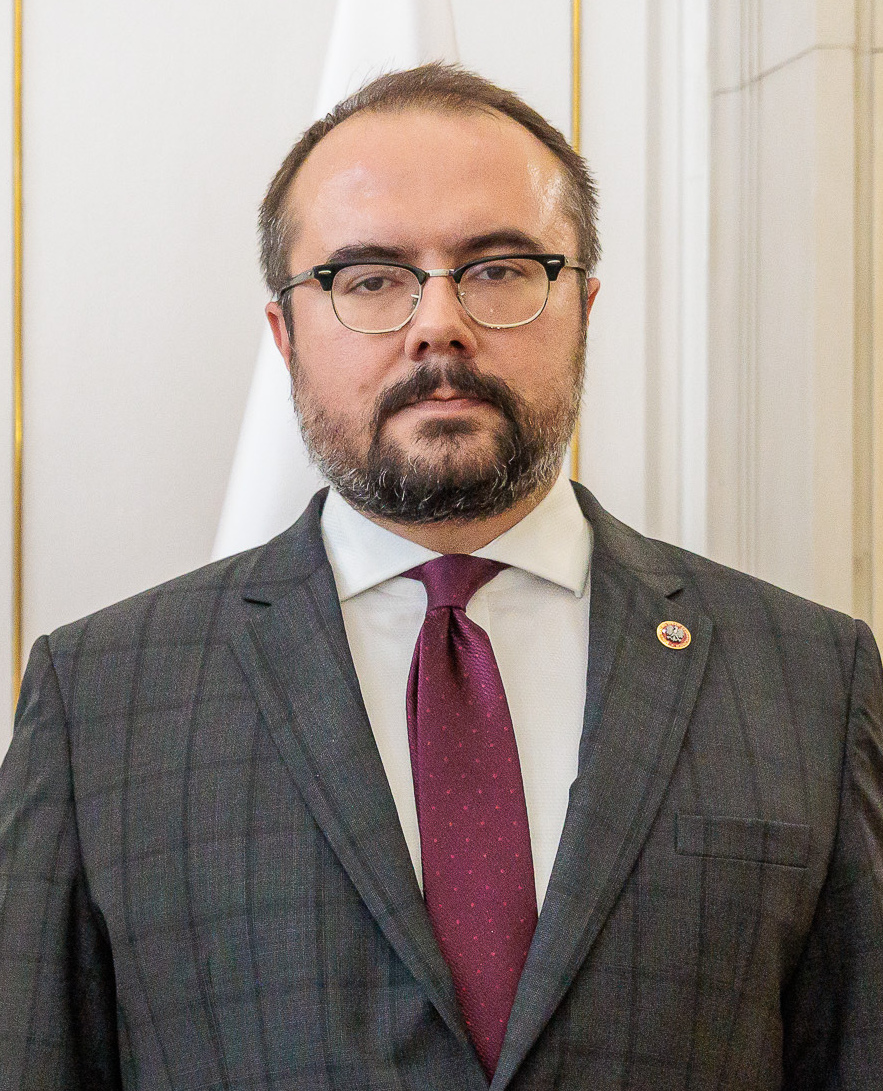
- Jabłoński in 2022

Member of the Sejm
- Incumbent
- Assumed office 13 November 2023
- Constituency: Bielsko-Biała II

Personal details
- Born: 25 January 1986 (age 40)
- Party: Law and Justice

Paweł Jabłoński (born 25 January 1986) is a Polish politician serving as a member of the Sejm since 2023. From 2019 to 2023, he served as deputy minister of foreign affairs.
