= Michał Kołodziejczak =

Polish politician

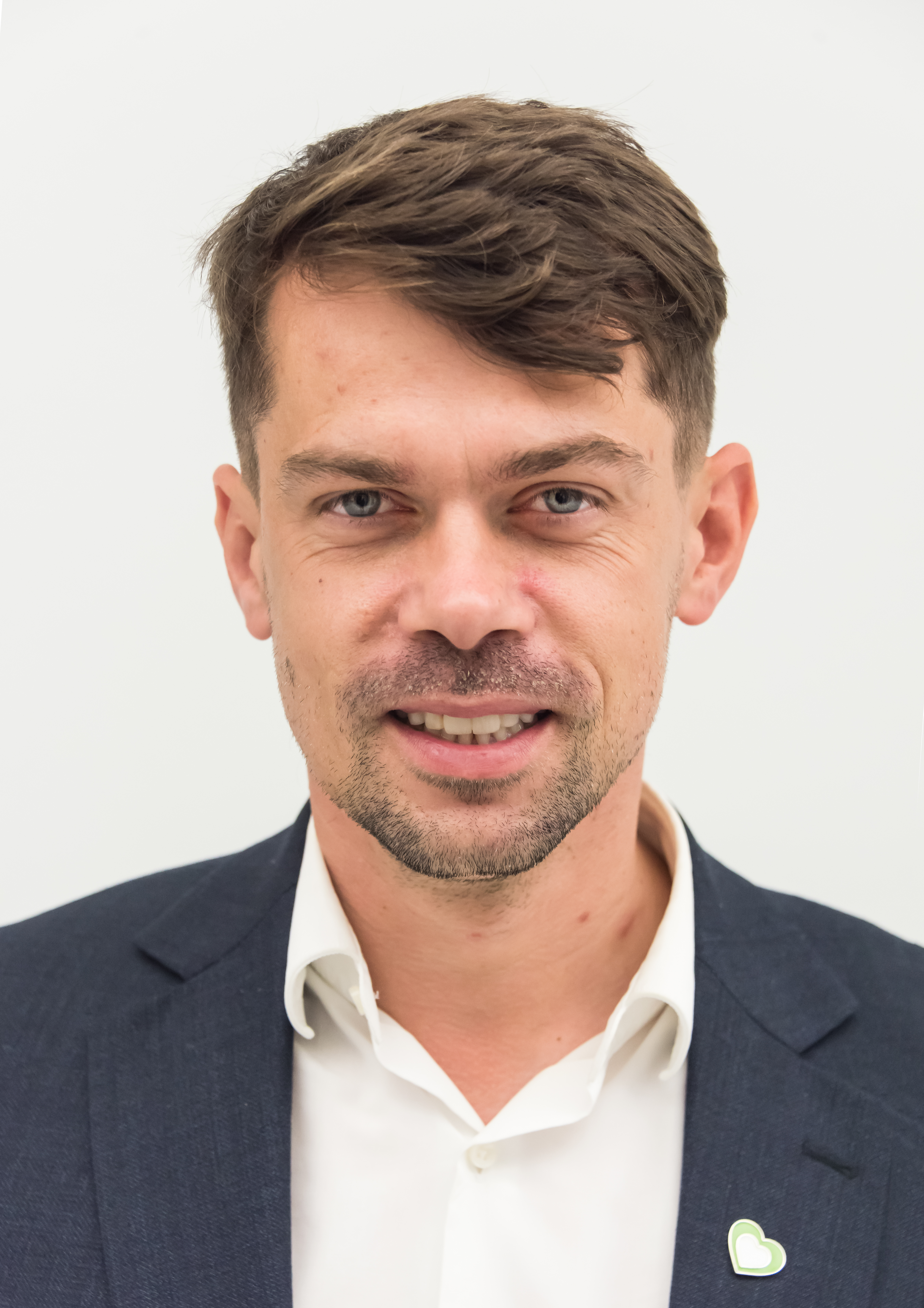
- Michał Kołodziejczak in 2023

Deputy Minister of Agriculture
- In office 13 December 2023 – 18 June 2025
- Preceded by: Janusz Kowalski

Member of the Sejm
- Incumbent
- Assumed office 13 November 2023
- Constituency: 37 Konin

Personal details
- Born: 14 September 1988 (age 38) Sieradz, Poland
- Party: AGROunia (2018–present)
- Other political affiliations: Law and Justice (2014–2015); Civic Coalition (since 2023)
- Education: Kazimierz Jagiellończyk School

Michał Kołodziejczak (born 14 September 1988) is a Polish politician and founder of AGROunia. He served as Deputy Minister of Agriculture from 2023 to 2025.

== Early life ==
Kołodziejczak started working as a farmer after graduating from Kazimierz Jagiellończyk School in Sieradz.

== Political career ==
In 2014, Kołodziejczak was elected as a councilor of Błaszki, Łódź Voivodeship, but excluded from the party one year later due to organizing protests. In 2018, he established the Unia Warzywno-Ziemniaczana association, which organised protests of the agricultural community against the PiS government's policy on the fight against the African swine fever virus, and against low purchase prices of agricultural produce in the Łódź Voivodeship. The same year on 7 December, Kołodziejczak registered the AGROunia Foundation.

In June 2019, Kołodziejczak announced the establishment of the Prawda Political Party, after which he announced that it would adopt the name Zgoda. He did not become a member of the party and withdrew from the project in August 2019.

In August 2023, Szymon Hołownia of Poland 2050 rejected the possibility of Kołodziejczak running together with RS Agrounia TAK in the parliamentary elections from the lists of the Trzecia Droga coalition. Kołodziejczak ran as a member of the Civic Coalition (KO) instead. In the 2023 parliamentary election, he was elected to the Sejm from the Konin constituency, receiving 44,062 votes. There is an ongoing controversy in Poland concerning his alleged studies at scandal-ridden private university Collegium Humanum. In October 2026, online media accused the former minister of misbehaving to female subordinates and drug use. His club membership in KO has been suspended.

== Personal life ==
Kołodziejczak is married with one daughter. On 25 January 2022, Citizen Lab reported that his mobile phone was under surveillance using Pegasus spy software.
