= Maja Staśko =

Polish left-wing activist (born 1990)

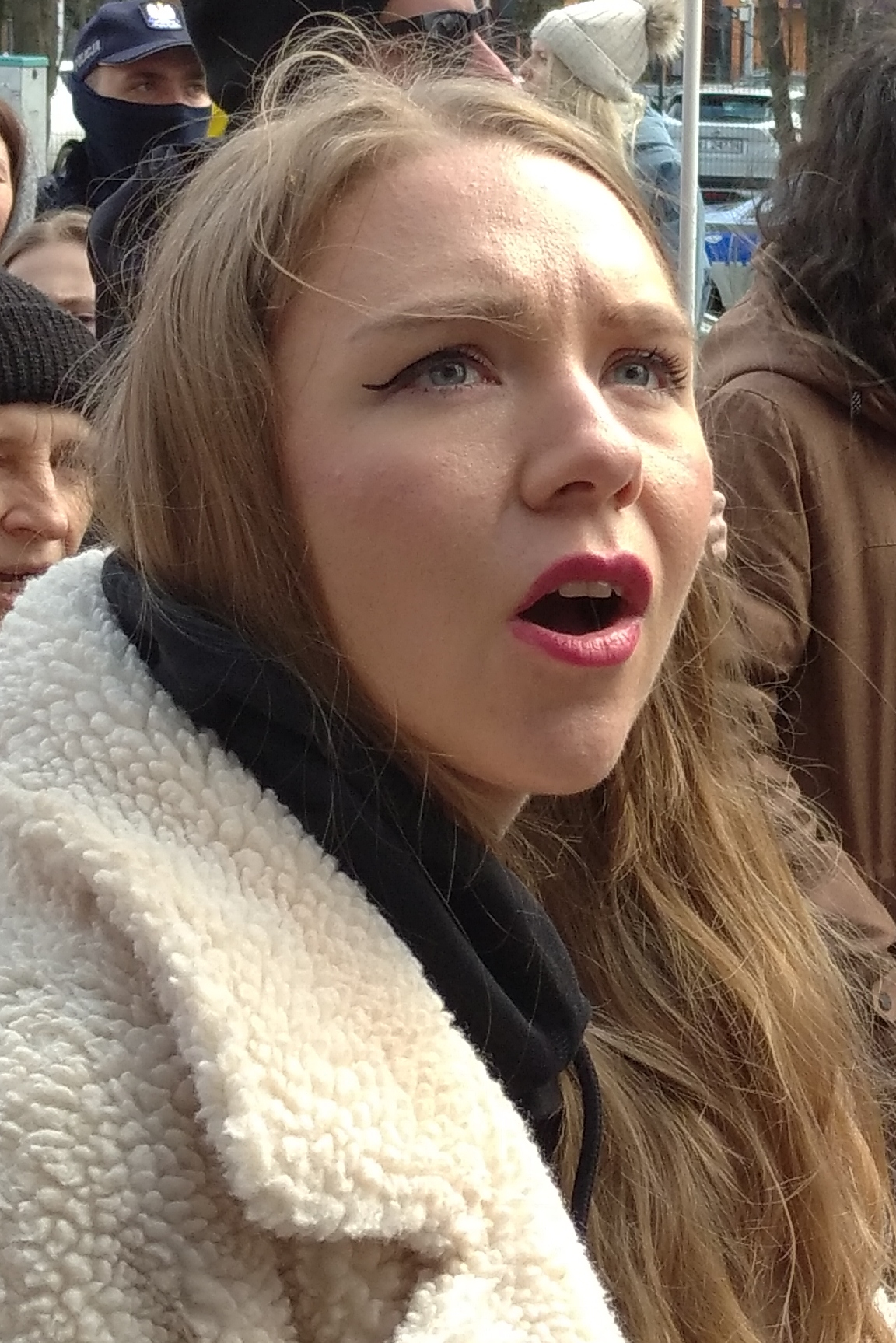
- Maja Staśko, 2022
- Born: 1990 (age 35–36)
- Occupations: Activist, writer, literary theorist, columnist, freak-fighter

Maja Staśko (born 1990) is a Polish left-wing and feminist activist, literary theorist, columnist, writer and freak-fighter.

Her master's thesis focused on the language of Eugeniusz Tkaczyszyn-Dycki's poetry. Her interests include contemporary Polish poetry, literary avant-garde movements, media theories—with an emphasis on new media—and philosophy.

== Books ==
- „Gwałt to przecież komplement”. Czym jest kultura gwałtu? (PDF). Warsaw: Staromiejski Dom Kultury. 2017. Archived from the original (PDF) on 25 July 2024.
- Gwałt polski. Warsaw: Wydawnictwo Krytyki Politycznej. 2020. ISBN 978-83-66586-28-4. Co-authored with Patrycja Wieczorkiewicz.
- Hejt polski. Krakow: Wydawnictwo Ha!art. 2022. ISBN 978-83-66571-58-7.
- Siostry w bólu. Historie o endometriozie. Wydawnictwo W.A.B. 2025. ISBN 9788384250525.
