= Marek Krząkała =

Polish politician and translator

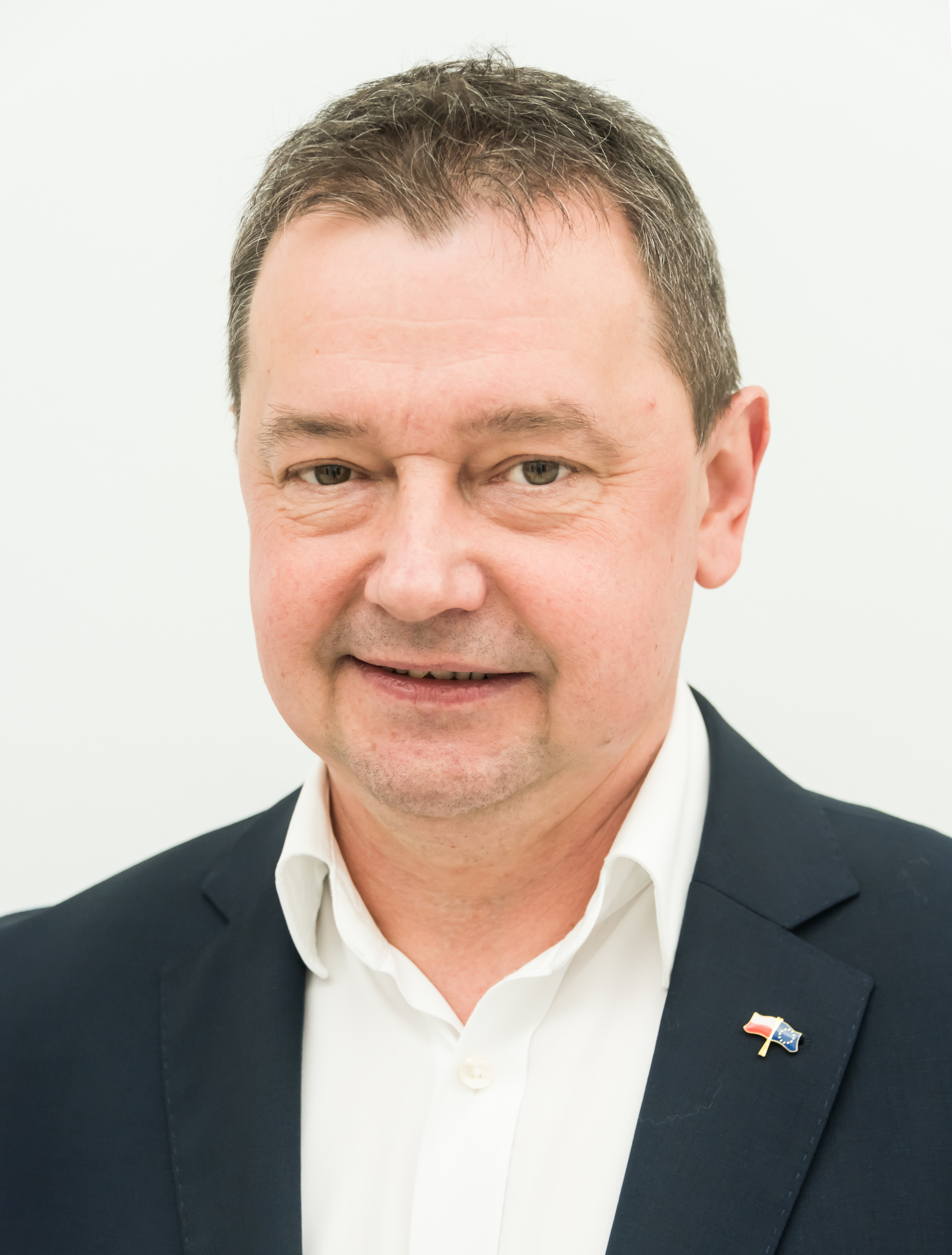

Member of the Polish Parliament
- Incumbent
- Assumed office 2007

Personal details
- Born: October 22, 1967 (age 58) Rybnik, Poland
- Education: University of Wrocław
- Occupation: Politician, translator

Marek Grzegorz Krząkała (born October 22, 1967) is a Polish politician, translator, and local government official, a member of the Polish Parliament (Sejm) in the VI, VII, VIII, IX, and X terms.

== Biography ==
He graduated in German studies from the University of Wrocław. He worked as a teacher and a German language translator (in 1996, he obtained the qualifications of a sworn translator).

In 2002, he joined the Civic Platform (Platforma Obywatelska, PO), taking on roles as the chairman of the party in Rybnik. He served in the regional council and the national council of the PO. In 2005, he unsuccessfully ran for a parliamentary seat.

From 2006 to 2007, he was a councilor in the Rybnik City Council and held the position of its chairman from November 25, 2006, to April 25, 2007.

During the parliamentary elections in 2007, securing 15,469 votes, he gained a parliamentary seat in the Rybnik electoral district. He became a member of the Committee on European Union Affairs and Foreign Affairs. He took on the role of vice-chair of the Polish-German Parliamentary Group, became a member of the Polish-Chinese Parliamentary Group, and the Parliamentary Group for Cooperation with Non-Governmental Organizations.

In the 2011 parliamentary elections, he successfully secured re-election, receiving 25,938 votes. He unsuccessfully ran in the by-elections for the Senate in 2014, securing the second position.

He was re-elected to the Parliament in 2015, gaining 15,404 votes. In the VIII term of the Parliament, he became a member of the Committee on European Union Affairs and the Committee on Foreign Affairs.

During the 2019 parliamentary elections, he ran on the Civic Coalition's list in the constituency No. 30, receiving 33,962 votes and regaining his parliamentary seat. Similarly, in 2023, he successfully ran for re-election, achieving 18,605 votes.

== Awards ==
In 2016, he was awarded the Commander's Cross of the Order of Merit of the Federal Republic of Germany.
