= List of Polish senators (2019–2023) =

10th term of the Senate of Poland

10th Senate
←	9th Senate	11th Senate	→

Overview
- Legislative body: Senate of Poland
- Term: 12 November 2019 – 12 November 2023
- Election: 2019
- Government: Morawiecki II (since 15 November 2019)
- Website: www.senat.gov.pl
- Members: 100 senators
- Senior Marshal: Barbara Borys-Damięcka
- Senate Marshal: Tomasz Grodzki
- Deputy Senate Marshals: Bogdan Borusewicz; Michał Kamiński; Gabriela Morawska-Stanecka; Marek Pęk

The 10th Senate of Poland was elected on 13 October 2019 at the 2019 Polish parliamentary election and lasted between 12 November 2019 and 12 November 2023. First meeting took place with the presence of the President Andrzej Duda and was led by the Marshal Senior Barbara Borys-Damięcka (KO) until new Senate Marshal Tomasz Grodzki (KO) was elected. (Note: Senate Marshal election (1st Session, Day 1, 12 November 2019): 51 for Grodzki (KO), 48 for Karczewski (PiS), 1 abstention.)

== Presidium ==
Office	Holder	Terms of office	
Senior Marshal	Barbara Borys-Damięcka	12 November 2019	
Marshal	Tomasz Grodzki	12 November 2019	12 November 2023
Deputy Marshals	Bogdan Borusewicz	12 November 2019	12 November 2023
Deputy Marshals	Michał Kamiński	12 November 2019	12 November 2023
Deputy Marshals	Stanisław Karczewski	12 November 2019	13 May 2020
Deputy Marshals	Gabriela Morawska-Stanecka	12 November 2019	12 November 2023
Deputy Marshals	Marek Pęk	13 May 2020	12 November 2023

== Composition ==
Senators were affiliated with following parliamentary groups as of first and last day of the term:

Parliamentary group	Senators		
Parliamentary group	Inaugural	Final	+/–
Law and Justice (PiS); Klub Parlamentarny Prawo i Sprawiedliwość	48	45	▼3
Civic Coalition (KO); Klub Parlamentarny Koalicja Obywatelska – Platforma Obywatelska, Nowoczesna, Inicjatywa Polska, Zieloni	43	40	▼3
Polish Coalition (KP); Koło Senatorów Koalicja Polska - Polskie Stronnictwo Ludowe	3	4	▲1
The Left (L); Koalicyjny Klub Parlamentarny Lewicy	2	1	▼1
Poland 2050 (PL2050); Koło Parlamentarne Polska 2050	—	1	▲1
Independent Senators Caucus (KSN); Koło Senatorów Niezależnych	—	3	▲3
Non-inscrits	4	4	Steady
Total	100	98	▼2
Vacant	0	2	▲2

== List ==
Senators elected on 13 October 2019 at the 2019 Polish parliamentary election, all in single-member constituencies numbered from 1 to 100 with first-past-the-post voting system were:

Key
†	Indicates senators deceased during the term (2 senators; for details see § Deceased during the term)

Constituency	Senator	Portrait	Party	Electoral committee	Parliamentary group	Number of votes	Percentage of votes
1	Rafał Ślusarz		Law and Justice	Law and Justice	Law and Justice	45,420	38.53%
2	Krzysztof Mróz		Law and Justice	Law and Justice	Law and Justice	49,938	39.68%
3	Dorota Czudowska		Law and Justice	Law and Justice	Law and Justice	86,312	46.67%
4	Agnieszka Kołacz-Leszczyńska		Civic Platform	Civic Coalition	Civic Coalition	70,209	49.85%
5	Aleksander Szwed		Law and Justice	Law and Justice	Law and Justice	61,035	43.45%
6	Bogdan Zdrojewski		Civic Platform	Civic Coalition	Civic Coalition	133,374	45.45%
7	Alicja Chybicka		Independent	Civic Coalition	Civic Coalition	113,877	69.21%
8	Barbara Zdrojewska		Civic Platform	Civic Coalition	Civic Coalition	122,071	65.64%
9	Andrzej Kobiak		Civic Platform	Civic Coalition	Civic Coalition	150,472	52.66%
10	Krzysztof Brejza		Civic Platform	Civic Coalition	Civic Coalition	79,054	45.76%
11	Antoni Mężydło		Civic Platform	Civic Coalition	Civic Coalition	98,699	60.90%
12	Ryszard Bober		Polish People's Party	Polish People's Party	Polish Coalition	52,619	39.26%
13	Józef Łyczak		Law and Justice	Law and Justice	Law and Justice	60,432	40.16%
14	Stanisław Gogacz		Law and Justice	Law and Justice	Law and Justice	121,240	62.27%
15	Grzegorz Czelej		Law and Justice	Law and Justice	Law and Justice	116,605	60.27%
16	Jacek Bury		Independent	Civic Coalition	Poland 2050	84,889	49.63%
17	Grzegorz Bierecki		Independent	Law and Justice	Law and Justice	68,666	59.06%
18	Józef Zając		Agreement	Law and Justice	Non-inscrits	61,416	60.72%
19	Jerzy Chróścikowski		Law and Justice	Law and Justice	Law and Justice	112,993	63.01%
20	Robert Dowhan		Civic Platform	Civic Coalition	Civic Coalition	97,398	66.43%
21	Władysław Komarnicki		Civic Platform	Civic Coalition	Civic Coalition	69,298	42.22%
22	Wadim Tyszkiewicz		Independent	Wadim Tyszkiewicz Voters' Committee	Independent Senators Caucus	63,675	51.90%
23	Artur Dunin		Civic Platform	Civic Coalition	Civic Coalition	134,414	67.17%
24	Krzysztof Kwiatkowski		Independent	Krzysztof Kwiatkowski Voters' Committee	Independent Senators Caucus	79,348	38.09%
25	Przemysław Błaszczyk		Law and Justice	Law and Justice	Law and Justice	69,998	57.69%
26	Maciej Łuczak		Law and Justice	Law and Justice	Law and Justice	70,561	41.82%
27	Michał Seweryński		Independent	Law and Justice	Law and Justice	86,706	52.20%
28	Wiesław Dobkowski		Law and Justice	Law and Justice	Law and Justice	102,812	55.63%
29	Rafał Ambrozik		Independent	Law and Justice	Law and Justice	83,024	53.32%
30	Andrzej Pająk		Law and Justice	Law and Justice	Law and Justice	179,338	57.90%
31	Marek Pęk		Law and Justice	Law and Justice	Law and Justice	122,468	57.35%
32	Jerzy Fedorowicz		Civic Platform	Civic Coalition	Civic Coalition	117,177	59.55%
33	Bogdan Klich		Civic Platform	Civic Coalition	Civic Coalition	123,080	54.66%
34	Włodzimierz Bernacki		Law and Justice	Law and Justice	Law and Justice	97,648	55.61%
35	Kazimierz Wiatr		Law and Justice	Law and Justice	Law and Justice	98,317	58.32%
36	Jan Hamerski		Law and Justice	Law and Justice	Law and Justice	113,454	65.35%
37	Wiktor Durlak		Law and Justice	Law and Justice	Law and Justice	107,119	60.33%
38	Marek Martynowski		Law and Justice	Law and Justice	Law and Justice	115,800	52.41%
39	Jan Maria Jackowski		Independent	Law and Justice	Non-inscrits	83,808	58.02%
40	Jolanta Hibner		Civic Platform	Civic Coalition	Civic Coalition	146,318	51.52%
41	Michał Kamiński		Union of European Democrats	Polish People's Party	Polish Coalition	176,496	58.56%
42	Marek Borowski		Civic Platform	Civic Coalition	Civic Coalition	153,994	64.55%
43	Barbara Borys-Damięcka †		Independent	Civic Coalition	Civic Coalition	157,359	53.08%
44	Kazimierz Michał Ujazdowski		Independent	Civic Coalition	Polish Coalition	308,627	55.25%
45	Aleksander Pociej		Civic Platform	Civic Coalition	Civic Coalition	175,660	67.06%
46	Robert Mamątow		Law and Justice	Law and Justice	Law and Justice	104,694	61.53%
47	Maria Koc		Law and Justice	Law and Justice	Law and Justice	99,549	62.00%
48	Waldemar Kraska		Law and Justice	Law and Justice	Law and Justice	72,101	61.49%
49	Stanisław Karczewski		Law and Justice	Law and Justice	Law and Justice	70,878	63.10%
50	Wojciech Skurkiewicz		Law and Justice	Law and Justice	Law and Justice	126,296	57.45%
51	Jerzy Czerwiński		Law and Justice	Law and Justice	Law and Justice	73,426	45.54%
52	Danuta Jazłowiecka		Civic Platform	Civic Coalition	Civic Coalition	60,597	54.54%
53	Beniamin Godyla		Civic Platform	Civic Coalition	Civic Coalition	53,012	40.63%
54	Janina Sagatowska		Law and Justice	Law and Justice	Law and Justice	94,603	63.15%
55	Zdzisław Pupa		Law and Justice	Law and Justice	Law and Justice	155,404	73.12%
56	Stanisław Ożóg		Law and Justice	Law and Justice	Law and Justice	123,900	56.85%
57	Alicja Zając		Law and Justice	Law and Justice	Law and Justice	100,300	65.49%
58	Mieczysław Golba		United Poland	Law and Justice	Law and Justice	150,594	64.75%
59	Marek Komorowski		Law and Justice	Law and Justice	Law and Justice	111,737	58.17%
60	Mariusz Gromko		Law and Justice	Law and Justice	Law and Justice	104,694	43.90%
61	Jacek Bogucki		Law and Justice	Law and Justice	Law and Justice	48,257	56.53%
62	Kazimierz Kleina		Civic Platform	Civic Coalition	Civic Coalition	123,191	60.02%
63	Stanisław Lamczyk		Civic Platform	Civic Coalition	Civic Coalition	90,404	46.81%
64	Sławomir Rybicki		Civic Platform	Civic Coalition	Civic Coalition	90,404	60.95%
65	Bogdan Borusewicz		Civic Platform	Civic Coalition	Civic Coalition	195,056	70.45%
66	Ryszard Świlski		Civic Platform	Civic Coalition	Civic Coalition	87,639	57.30%
67	Leszek Czarnobaj		Civic Platform	Civic Coalition	Civic Coalition	53,771	60.92%
68	Ryszard Majer		Law and Justice	Law and Justice	Law and Justice	82,080	48.26%
69	Wojciech Konieczny		Polish Socialist Party	Democratic Left Alliance	The Left	49,261	43.75%
70	Zygmunt Frankiewicz		Independent	Civic Coalition	Civic Coalition	124,255	61.09%
71	Halina Bieda		Civic Platform	Civic Coalition	Civic Coalition	74,605	57.19%
72	Ewa Gawęda		Independent	Law and Justice	Independent	97,412	54.05%
73	Wojciech Piecha		Law and Justice	Law and Justice	Law and Justice	68,619	46.18%
74	Dorota Tobiszowska		Independent	Law and Justice	Law and Justice	71,752	38.35%
75	Gabriela Morawska-Stanecka		Independent	Democratic Left Alliance	Civic Coalition	64,172	50.93%
76	Beata Małecka-Libera		Civic Platform	Civic Coalition	Civic Coalition	82,090	43.14%
77	Joanna Sekuła		Civic Platform	Civic Coalition	Civic Coalition	83,771	59.60%
78	Agnieszka Gorgoń-Komor		Civic Platform	Civic Coalition	Civic Coalition	114,113	51.09%
79	Tadeusz Kopeć		The Republicans	Law and Justice	Law and Justice	78,655	49.16%
80	Marek Plura †		Civic Platform	Civic Coalition	Civic Coalition	92,332	62.15%
81	Jacek Włosowicz		Independent	Law and Justice	Law and Justice	121,321	64.09%
82	Jarosław Rusiecki		Law and Justice	Law and Justice	Law and Justice	87,428	49.30%
83	Krzysztof Słoń		Law and Justice	Law and Justice	Law and Justice	97,471	49.33%
84	Jerzy Wcisła		Civic Platform	Civic Coalition	Civic Coalition	57,022	44.62%
85	Bogusława Orzechowska		Law and Justice	Law and Justice	Law and Justice	51,378	41.98%
86	Lidia Staroń		Independent	Lidia Staroń – Always on People's Side Voters' Committee	Independent Senators Caucus	106 035	59.46%
87	Małgorzata Kopiczko		Law and Justice	Law and Justice	Law and Justice	63,910	42.05%
88	Adam Szejnfeld		Civic Platform	Civic Coalition	Civic Coalition	77,873	43.64%
89	Jan Filip Libicki		Polish People's Party	Polish People's Party	Polish Coalition	105,042	63.04%
90	Jadwiga Rotnicka		Civic Platform	Civic Coalition	Civic Coalition	142,987	69.41%
91	Marcin Bosacki		Civic Platform	Civic Coalition	Civic Coalition	213,492	72.02%
92	Paweł Arndt		Civic Platform	Civic Coalition	Civic Coalition	76,897	41.71%
93	Margareta Budner		Independent	Law and Justice	Law and Justice	98,117	59.34%
94	Wojciech Ziemniak		Civic Platform	Civic Coalition	Civic Coalition	77,057	51.35%
95	Ewa Matecka		Independent	Civic Coalition	Civic Coalition	80,084	50.73%
96	Janusz Pęcherz		Independent	Civic Coalition	Civic Coalition	72,579	50.55%
97	Tomasz Grodzki		Civic Platform	Civic Coalition	Civic Coalition	149,245	65.57%
98	Magdalena Kochan		Civic Platform	Civic Coalition	Civic Coalition	135,041	58.29%
99	Janusz Gromek		Civic Platform	Civic Coalition	Civic Coalition	59,348	43.45%
100	Stanisław Gawłowski		Civic Platform	Civic Democracy Voters' Committee	Non-inscrit	44,956	33.67%

=== Deceased during the term ===
Senator	Office termination	Reason	Succeeded by
Marek Plura	20 January 2023	Death	Vacant (296 days)
Barbara Borys-Damięcka	9 June 2023	Death	Vacant (156 days)

== See also ==
- 9th term Sejm and 10th term Senate of Poland
- List of Sejm members (2019–2023)
