= List of Polish senators (2015–2019) =

9th term of the Senate of Poland

9th Senate
←	8th Senate	10th Senate	→

Overview
- Legislative body: Senate of Poland
- Term: 12 November 2015 – 11 November 2019
- Election: 2015
- Government: Szydło; Morawiecki I
- Website: www.senat.gov.pl
- Members: 100 senators
- Senior Marshal: Michał Seweryński
- Senate Marshal: Stanisław Karczewski
- Deputy Senate Marshals: Bogdan Borusewicz; Maria Koc; Michał Seweryński; Marek Pęk

The 9th Senate of Poland was elected on 25 October 2015 at the 2015 parliamentary election and lasted between 12 November 2015 and 11 November 2019. Senate Marshal was Stanisław Karczewski (PiS).

== Presidium ==
Office	Holder	Terms of office	
Senior Marshal	Michał Seweryński	12 November 2015	
Marshal	Stanisław Karczewski	12 November 2015	11 November 2019
Deputy Marshals	Adam Bielan	12 November 2015	28 May 2019
Deputy Marshals	Bogdan Borusewicz	12 November 2015	11 November 2019
Deputy Marshals	Grzegorz Czelej	12 November 2019	20 April 2017
Deputy Marshals	Maria Koc	12 November 2019	11 November 2019
Deputy Marshals	Michał Seweryński	20 April 2017	11 November 2019
Deputy Marshals	Marek Pęk	26 June 2019	11 November 2019

== Composition ==
Numbers of senators affiliated with following parliamentary clubs or caucuses as of the first and last day of the 9th term:

Parliamentary group	Senators		
Parliamentary group	Inaugural	Final	+/–
Law and Justice	62	61	▼1
Civic Coalition	33	26	▼7
Polish Coalition	1	1	Steady
Independent Senators Caucus	3	0	▼3
Non-inscrits	1	8	▲7
Total	100	96	▼4
Vacant	0	4	▲4

== List ==
Full list of 100 senators elected on 25 October 2015 at 2015 election, and one senator by-elected on 6 March 2016:

Key
‡	Indicates by-elected senator.
	Indicates senators, who left their seat during their term.
For details see § Departed/replaced.

Constituency	Senator	Party	Electoral committee	Parliamentary group	# of votes	% of votes
1	Rafał Ślusarz	Law and Justice	Law and Justice	Law and Justice	34,858	36.93%
2	Krzysztof Mróz	Law and Justice	Law and Justice	Law and Justice	31,790	31.08%
3	Dorota Czudowska	Law and Justice	Law and Justice	Law and Justice	68,447	43.47%
4	Wiesław Kilian	Civic Platform	Civic Platform	Civic Coalition	36,383	30.60%
5	Aleksander Szwed	Law and Justice	Law and Justice	Law and Justice	39,803	34.44%
6	Jarosław Duda	Civic Platform	Civic Platform	Civic Coalition	83,369	37.30%
7	Barbara Zdrojewska	Civic Platform	Civic Platform	Civic Coalition	63,110	44.69%
8	Jarosław Obremski	Independent	KWW Obremski – Independent Senator from Wrocław	Law and Justice	89,699	60.55%
9	Andrzej Kobiak	Civic Platform	Civic Platform	Civic Coalition	102,191	43.20%
10	Jan Rulewski	Independent	Civic Platform	Non-inscrits	49,019	36.33%
11	Przemysław Termiński	Independent	Civic Platform	Civic Coalition	62,478	46.94%
12	Andrzej Mioduszewski	Law and Justice	Law and Justice	Law and Justice	37,790	35.43%
13	Józef Łyczak	Law and Justice	Law and Justice	Law and Justice	40,106	33.87%
14	Stanisław Gogacz	Law and Justice	Law and Justice	Law and Justice	96,064	59.48%
15	Grzegorz Czelej	Law and Justice	Law and Justice	Law and Justice	96,101	59.23%
16	Andrzej Stanisławek	Agreement	Law and Justice	Law and Justice	67,708	44.43%
17	Grzegorz Bierecki	Independent	KWW Grzegorz Bierecki	Law and Justice	42,862	44.12%
18	Józef Zając	Agreement	Polish People's Party	Law and Justice	42,083	49.11%
19	Jerzy Chróścikowski	Law and Justice	Law and Justice	Law and Justice	81,235	53.13%
20	Waldemar Sługocki	Civic Platform	Civic Platform	Civic Coalition	61,018	52.05%
21	Władysław Komarnicki	Civic Platform	Civic Platform	Civic Coalition	44,991	34.65%
22	Robert Dowhan	Civic Platform	Civic Platform	Civic Coalition	39,008	40.97%
23	Maciej Grubski	Independent	Civic Platform	Non-inscrits	72,276	40.45%
24	Ryszard Bronisławski	Independent	Civic Platform	Civic Coalition	85,639	50.36%
25	Przemysław Błaszczyk	Law and Justice	Law and Justice	Law and Justice	43,971	44.93%
26	Maciej Łuczak	Law and Justice	Law and Justice	Law and Justice	58,237	42.98%
27	Michał Seweryński	Independent	Law and Justice	Law and Justice	59,410	45.63%
28	Wiesław Dobkowski	Law and Justice	Law and Justice	Law and Justice	71,764	46.29%
29	Rafał Ambrozik	Independent	Law and Justice	Law and Justice	53,780	42.18%
30	Andrzej Pająk	Law and Justice	Law and Justice	Law and Justice	141,283	52.66%
31	Marek Pęk	Law and Justice	Law and Justice	Law and Justice	85,793	49.90%
32	Jerzy Fedorowicz	Civic Platform	Civic Platform	Civic Coalition	72,044	42.51%
33	Bogdan Klich	Civic Platform	Civic Platform	Civic Coalition	71,852	38.04%
34	Zbigniew Cichoń	Independent	Law and Justice	Law and Justice	77,459	54.33%
35	Kazimierz Wiatr	Law and Justice	Law and Justice	Law and Justice	91,164	64.11%
36	Jan Hamerski	Law and Justice	Law and Justice	Law and Justice	86,955	60.38%
37	Stanisław Kogut	Law and Justice	Law and Justice	Non-inscrits	111,782	66.70%
38	Marek Martynowski	Law and Justice	Law and Justice	Law and Justice	80,133	43.28%
39	Jan Maria Jackowski	Independent	Law and Justice	Law and Justice	56,216	49.67%
40	Jan Żaryn	Independent	Law and Justice	Law and Justice	119,870	52.78%
41	Konstanty Radziwiłł	Law and Justice	Law and Justice	Law and Justice	99,875	39.50%
42	Marek Borowski	Independent	KWW Marek Borkowski	Non-inscrits	99,875	60.69%
43	Marek Rocki	Civic Platform	Civic Platform	Civic Coalition	108,638	42.56%
44	Barbara Borys-Damięcka	Independent	Civic Platform	Civic Coalition	164,796	43.41%
45	Aleksander Pociej	Independent	Civic Platform	Civic Coalition	100,445	45.09%
46	Robert Mamątow	Law and Justice	Law and Justice	Law and Justice	75,514	45.09%
47	Maria Koc	Law and Justice	Law and Justice	Law and Justice	70,217	53.19%
48	Waldemar Kraska	Law and Justice	Law and Justice	Law and Justice	55,592	56.34%
49	Stanisław Karczewski	Law and Justice	Law and Justice	Law and Justice	54,489	61.61%
50	Adam Bielan	Agreement	Law and Justice	Law and Justice	77,912	43.52%
51	Jerzy Czerwiński	Law and Justice	Law and Justice	Law and Justice	41,623	30.68%
52	Piotr Wach	Civic Platform	Civic Platform	Civic Coalition	27,693	29.69%
53	Grzegorz Peczkis	Law and Justice	Law and Justice	Law and Justice	25,508	23.07%
54	Janina Sagatowska	Law and Justice	Law and Justice	Law and Justice	69,029	53.96%
55	Zdzisław Pupa	Law and Justice	Law and Justice	Law and Justice	118,567	64.23%
56	Aleksander Bobko	Independent	Law and Justice	Law and Justice	81,570	42.74%
57	Alicja Zając	Law and Justice	Law and Justice	Law and Justice	77,101	58.71%
58	Mieczysław Golba	Sovereign Poland	Law and Justice	Law and Justice	110,155	57.19%
59	Bohdan Paszkowski	Law and Justice	Law and Justice	Law and Justice	76,569	49.65%
59	Anna Maria Anders^{‡}	Independent	Law and Justice	Law and Justice	30,661	46.98%
60	Jan Dobrzyński	Law and Justice	Law and Justice	Non-inscrits	92,252	45.89%
61	Tadeusz Romańczuk	Law and Justice	Law and Justice	Law and Justice	39,607	54.63%
62	Kazimierz Kleina	Civic Platform	Civic Platform	Civic Coalition	93,594	58.12%
63	Waldemar Bonkowski	Independent	Law and Justice	Non-inscrits	60,596	40.25%
64	Sławomir Rybicki	Civic Platform	Civic Platform	Civic Coalition	78,421	53.53%
65	Bogdan Borusewicz	Civic Platform	Civic Platform	Civic Coalition	122,543	53.03%
66	Antoni Szymański	Independent	Law and Justice	Law and Justice	43,842	36.21%
67	Leszek Czarnobaj	Civic Platform	Civic Platform	Civic Coalition	27,721	40.04%
68	Ryszard Majer	Law and Justice	Law and Justice	Law and Justice	51,768	37.99%
69	Artur Warzocha	Law and Justice	Law and Justice	Law and Justice	34,969	35.18%
70	Krystian Probierz	Independent	Law and Justice	Law and Justice	61,271	35.27%
71	Maria Pańczyk-Pozdziej	Independent	Civic Platform	Civic Coalition	40,010	34.00%
72	Adam Gawęda	Law and Justice	Law and Justice	Law and Justice	69,014	43.36%
73	Wojciech Piecha	Law and Justice	Law and Justice	Law and Justice	57,552	44.76%
74	Leszek Piechota	Law and Justice	Civic Platform	Law and Justice	55,179	34.11%
75	Czesław Ryszka	Law and Justice	Law and Justice	Law and Justice	54,718	50.48%
76	Arkadiusz Grabowski	Law and Justice	Law and Justice	Law and Justice	57,092	36.40%
77	Michał Potoczny	Law and Justice	Law and Justice	Law and Justice	37,380	30.15%
78	Andrzej Kamiński	Law and Justice	Law and Justice	Law and Justice	93,299	47.64%
79	Tadeusz Kopeć	Agreement	Law and Justice	Law and Justice	58,482	43.23%
80	Andrzej Misiołek	Law and Justice	Civic Platform	Law and Justice	42,863	31.96%
81	Jacek Włosowicz	Sovereign Poland	Law and Justice	Law and Justice	69,115	45.74%
82	Jarosław Rusiecki	Law and Justice	Law and Justice	Law and Justice	54,549	36.86%
83	Krzysztof Słoń	Law and Justice	Law and Justice	Law and Justice	76,529	46.06%
84	Jerzy Wcisła	Civic Platform	Civic Platform	Civic Coalition	43,368	41.37%
85	Bogusława Orzechowska	Law and Justice	Law and Justice	Law and Justice	33,857	35.68%
86	Lidia Staroń	Independent	KWW Lidia Staroń – Always on People's Side	Non-inscrits	63,870	43.79%
87	Małgorzata Kopiczko	Law and Justice	Law and Justice	Law and Justice	43,727	36.44%
88	Mieczysław Augustyn	Civic Platform	Civic Platform	Civic Coalition	45,410	32.44%
89	Jan Filip Libicki	Polish People's Party	Civic Platform	Polish People's Party	54,354	42.30%
90	Piotr Florek	Civic Platform	Civic Platform	Civic Coalition	65,749	42.92%
91	Jadwiga Rotnicka	Civic Platform	Civic Platform	Civic Coalition	163,940	67.17%
92	Robert Gaweł	Independent	Law and Justice	Law and Justice	51,878	36.25%
93	Margareta Budner	Independent	Law and Justice	Law and Justice	53,754	39.98%
94	Marian Poślednik	Civic Platform	Civic Platform	Civic Coalition	33,802	28.76%
95	Łukasz Mikołajczyk	Law and Justice	Law and Justice	Law and Justice	46,949	36.68%
96	Andrzej Wojtyła	Agreement	Law and Justice	Law and Justice	43,068	36.84%
97	Tomasz Grodzki	Civic Platform	Civic Platform	Civic Coalition	69,887	36.35%
98	Grzegorz Napieralski	Independent	Civic Platform	Civic Coalition	56,112	30.32%
99	Grażyna Sztark	Civic Platform	Civic Platform	Non-inscrits	38,861	36.14%
100	Piotr Zientarski	Civic Platform	Civic Platform	Civic Coalition	40,452	36.88%

=== Departed/replaced ===
Senator	Office termination	Reason	Succeeded by	By-election (Turnout)	Assumed seat
Bohdan Paszkowski	9 December 2015	Appointed a Voivode of Podlasie	Anna Maria Anders	6 March 2016 (17.11%)	9 March 2016
Wiesław Kilian	15 March 2019	Death	Vacant (241 days)	—	
Adam Bielan	28 May 2019	Elected a MEP	Vacant (167 days)	—	
Jarosław Duda	28 May 2019	Elected a MEP	Vacant (167 days)	—	
Anna Maria Anders	23 August 2019	Nominated for a Polish Ambassador to Italy	Vacant (80 days)	—	

== See also ==
- List of Sejm members (2015–2019)
- 2015 Polish parliamentary election
