= Senate Constituency no. 43 =

Parliamentary constituency in Poland

- Okręg wyborczy nr 43
- Constituency for the Senate of Poland
- Location within Poland.
- Districts of Warsaw: Mokotów, Ursynów, Wawer, Wilanów
- Voivodeship: Masovian
- Electorate: 369,053 (2023)

Current constituency
- Created: 2011
- Party: Civic Platform
- Senator: Małgorzata Kidawa-Błońska

Senate Constituency no. 43 (Polish: Okręg wyborczy nr 43 do Senatu) is a single-member constituency for the Senate of Poland comprising four districts of the city of Warsaw: Mokotów, Ursynów, Wawer and Wilanów. Incumbent senator is Małgorzata Kidawa-Błońska (Civic Platform) elected in 2023 parliamentary election. She serves as the Marshal of the Senate.

== List of senators ==
Senate term	Senator	Party	Parliamentary group	Election committee	Elected	Assumed office	Left office
8th	Marek Rocki	Civic Platform	Civic Platform	Civic Platform	2011	8 November 2011	11 November 2019
9th	Marek Rocki	Civic Platform	Civic Coalition	Civic Platform	2015	8 November 2011	11 November 2019
10th	Barbara Borys-Damięcka	Independent	Civic Coalition	Civic Coalition	2019	12 November 2019	9 June 2023 (Note: Barbara Borys-Damięcka died on 9 June 2023. The seat has not been recontested.)
10th	Vacant for 156 days						
11th	Małgorzata Kidawa-Błońska	Civic Platform	Civic Coalition	Civic Coalition	2019	13 November 2023	Incumbent

== Election results ==
2011 parliamentary election
Party	Candidate	Votes	%	±%
PO	Marek Rocki	122,648	49.1	−
PiS	Anna Chodakowska	67,595	27.1	−
Independent	Andrzej Celiński	59,469	23.8	−
Majority		55,053	22.0	N/A
Turnout		258,117	71.0	N/A

2015 parliamentary election
Party	Candidate	Votes	%	±%
PO	Marek Rocki	108,638	42.6	−6.6
PiS	Anna Chodakowska	81,797	32.0	+5.0
PD	Andrzej Celiński	64,829	25.4	-
Majority		26,841	10.6	−27.3
Turnout		264,445	71.7	+0.7

2019 parliamentary election
Party	Candidate	Votes	%	±%
PO (KO)	Barbara Borys-Damięcka	157,359	53.1	+10.5
PiS	Lech Jaworski	81,168	27.4	−4.7
PL	Monika Jaruzelska	57,946	19.6	-
Majority		76191	25.7	+15.1
Turnout		302,585	79.0	+7.3

=== 2023 ===
2023 parliamentary election
Candidate	Committee	Votes	%
Małgorzata Kidawa-Błońska	Civic Coalition	231,122	74.70
Alvin Gajadhur	Law and Justice	78,293	25.30
Total		309,415	100.00
Valid votes		309,415	96.89
Invalid/blank votes		9,934	3.11
Total votes		319,349	100.00
Registered voters/turnout		369,053	86.53
Source: National Electoral Commission
