= Paweł Arndt =

Polish politician (born 1954)

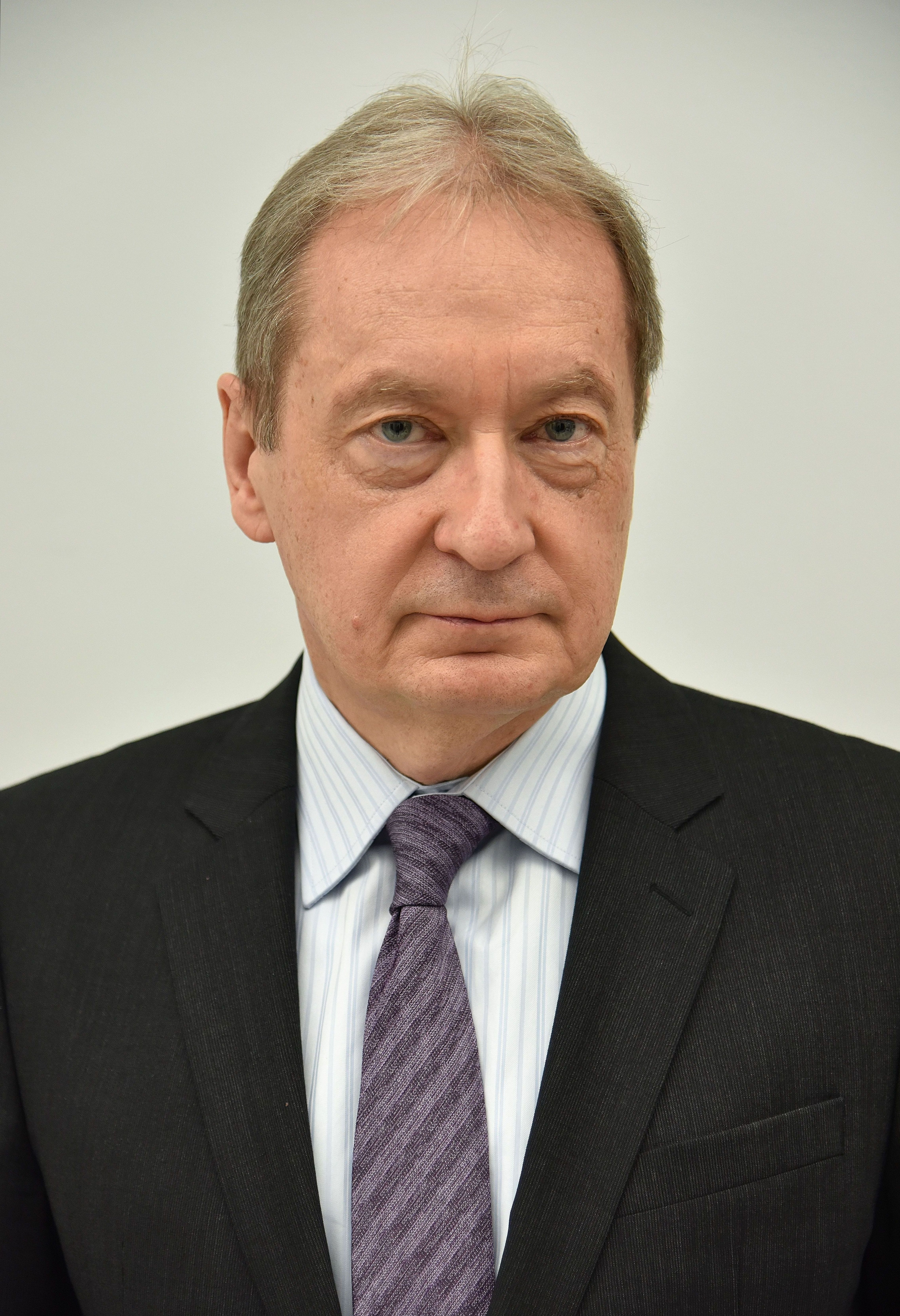

Member of the 10th Senate
- In office 2019 – 2023
- Constituency: 92 Konin

Deputy of the Sejm
- In office 2005 – 2019
- Constituency: 37 Konin
- In office 1997 – 2001
- Constituency: 35 Poznań

Personal details
- Born: 21 January 1954 (age 72) Gniezno, Polish People's Republic
- Party: Civic Platform (since 2005)
- Other political affiliations: Solidarity Electoral Action (until 2005)

Paweł Antoni Arndt (born 21 January 1954 in Gniezno) is a Polish politician.

He was first elected to the Sejm during the 3rd term (1997–2001), representing Solidarity Electoral Action. He was elected to the Sejm again on 25 September 2005 getting 6546 votes in 37 Konin district, campaigning on the Civic Platform list. He was reelected to the Sejm three more times, serving in the V through VIII terms.

In 2019, he was elected to the 10th Senate.

== See also ==
- Members of Polish Sejm 2005-2007
