= Gabriela Morawska-Stanecka =

Polish lawyer, manager and politician

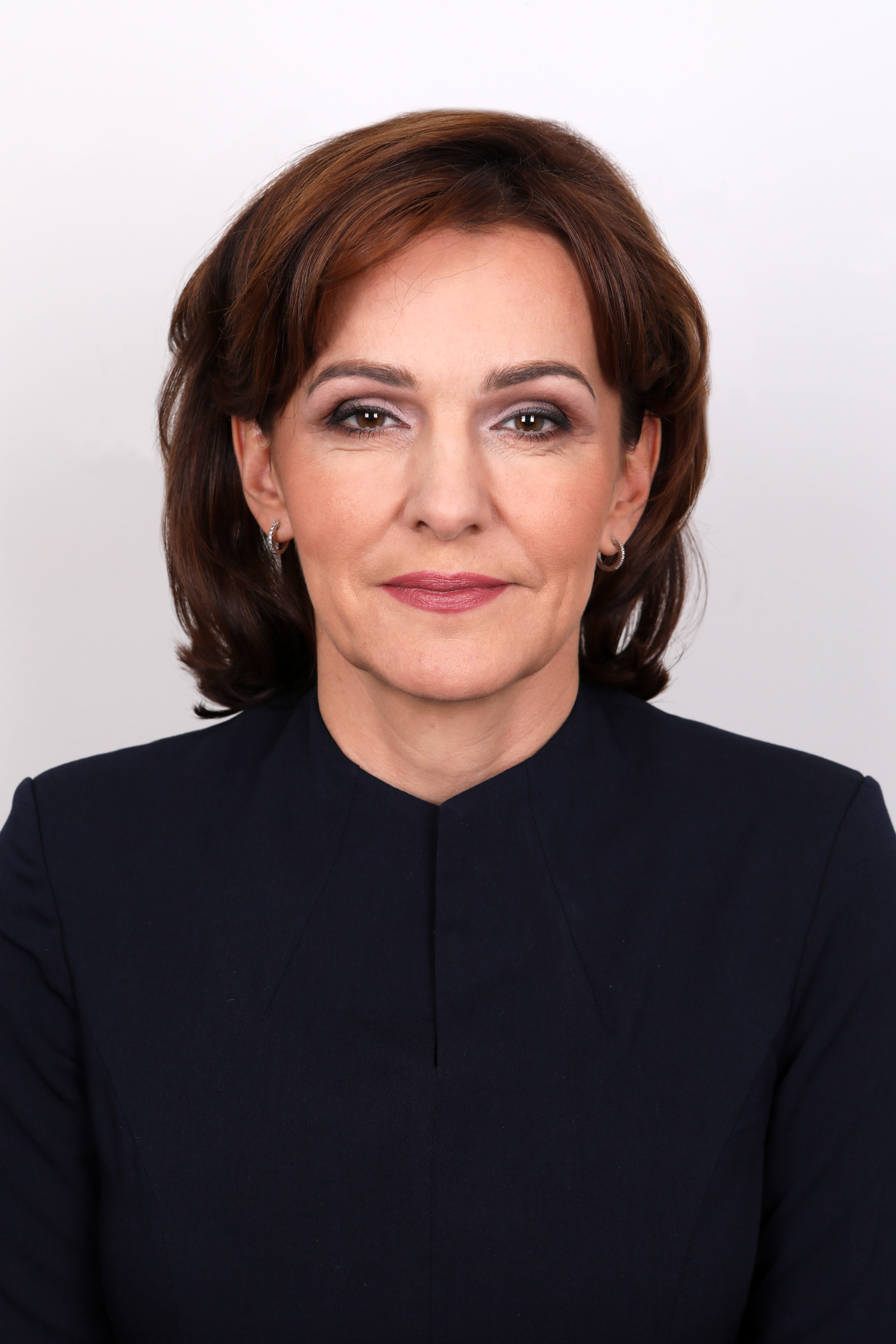

Deputy Marshal of the Senate
- In office 12 November 2019 – 12 November 2023

Member of Senate
- Incumbent
- Assumed office 12 November 2019
- Preceded by: Czesław Ryszka
- Constituency: 74-Chorzów

Personal details
- Born: 17 March 1968 (age 58) Szczyrk, Silesia, Poland
- Party: Spring (2019-2021); Polish Socialist Party (2021-2023); Independent (2023-)
- Other political affiliations: The Left (2019-2023); Civic Coalition (2023-present)
- Children: 2
- Education: Jagiellonian University
- Profession: Lawyer, manager, and politician

Gabriela Anna Morawska-Stanecka (born 17 March 1968) is a Polish lawyer, manager and left-wing politician.

== Biography ==
She graduated from the Faculty of Law and Administration of the Jagiellonian University. Morawska-Stanecka worked as a civil law notary and later as a barrister. In 1994–2006, she participated in heavy industry restructuring processes in Poland. She was also on the supervisory committee of an energy corporation.

Morawska-Stanecka was the Democratic Left Alliance candidate for the Polish Senate in District 74 Silesia (Tychy and Mysłowice as well as Bieruń-Lędziny County) in 2019. She defeated Czesław Ryszka, of the Law and Justice party, with Morawska-Stanecka receiving 50.93% of the votes. After taking office as a member of the Senate, Morawska-Stanecka was elected to the position of deputy marshal, assuming that role on 12 November 2019. Morawska-Stanecka was the deputy leader of the centre-left Spring (Polish: Wiosna) party, where she was responsible for legal and legislative matters. In the 2023 elections she was reelected as a senator receiving 47.75% of the votes.
