= Jarosław Duda (politician) =

Polish politician

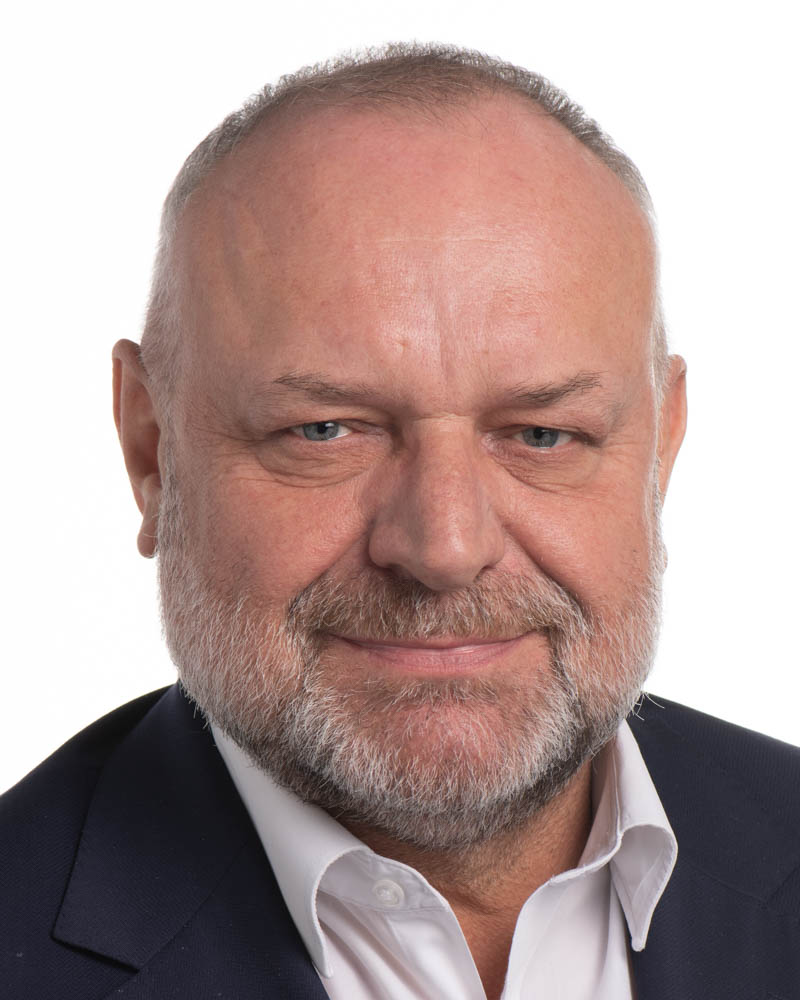

Member of European Parliament
- In office 2019–2024

Member of Sejm
- In office 2005–2007

Personal details
- Born: 29 April 1964 (age 62) Wrocław, Polish People's Republic
- Party: Civic Platform

Jarosław Duda-Latoszewski (born 29 April 1964) is a Polish politician. He was elected to the Sejm on 25 September 2005, getting 5,901 votes in 3 Wrocław district as a candidate from the Civic Platform list.

== See also ==
- Members of Polish Sejm; 2005–2007
