= Marek Plura =

Polish politician (1970–2023)

Marek Mirosław Plura
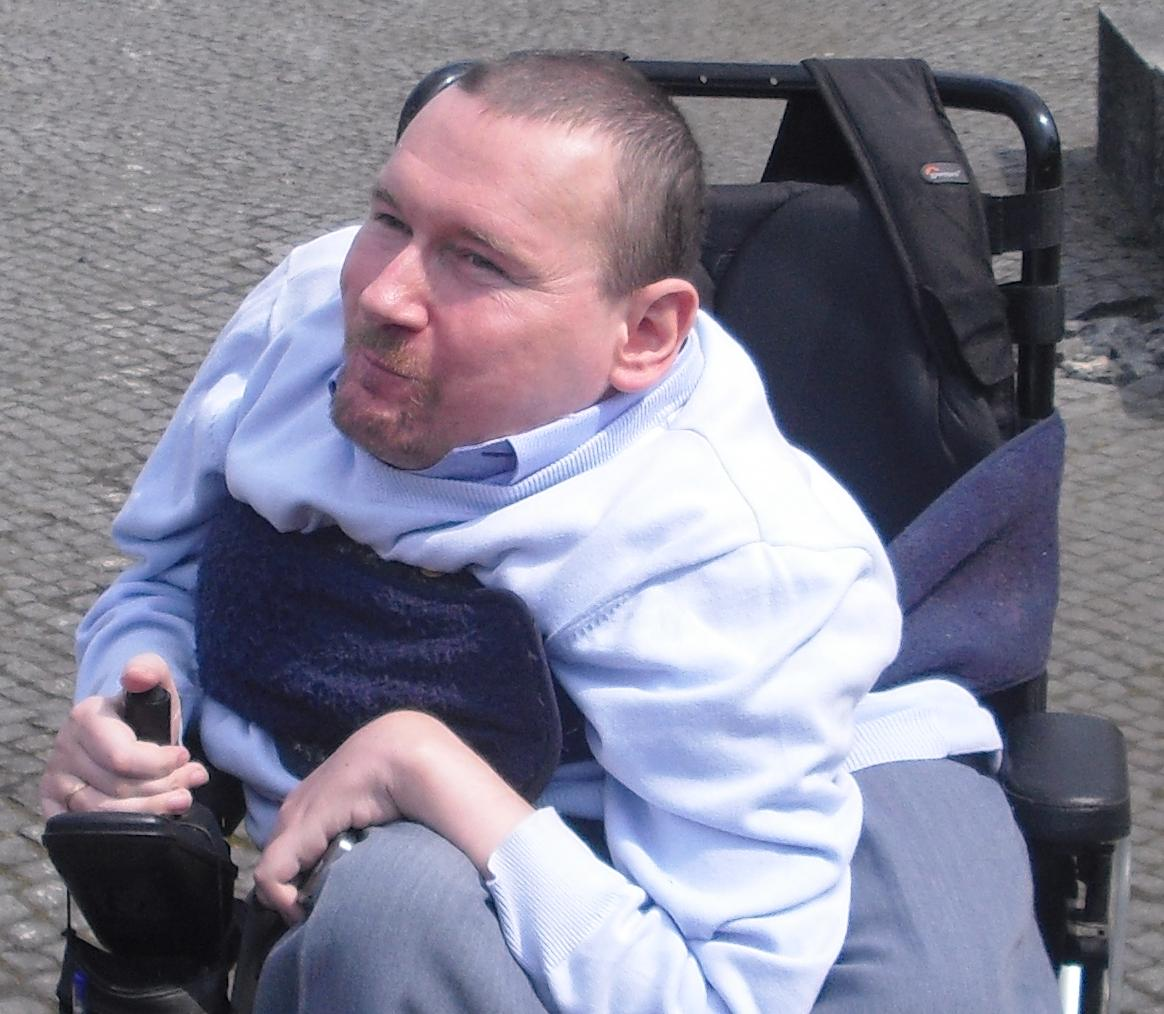
- Plura in 2014

Member of the European Parliament
- In office 2014–2019
- Constituency: Poland

Member of the Polish Parliament
- In office 2007–2011
- In office 2011–2015

Member of the Senate of Poland
- In office 2019–2023

Personal details
- Born: 18 July 1970 Racibórz, Poland
- Died: 20 January 2023 (aged 52) Katowice, Poland
- Party: Civic Platform
- Education: University of Silesia in Katowice
- Occupation: Politician, Social Activist, Psychotherapist
- Awards: Employment, Social Affairs and Regions Award at The Parliament Magazine's annual MEP Awards (2019)

Marek Mirosław Plura (18 July 1970 – 20 January 2023) was a Polish politician, social activist, and psychotherapist. He was a two-time member of the Polish Parliament and served as Member of the European Parliament (MEP) from 2014 until 2019.

In 2019, Plura was the recipient of the Employment, Social Affairs and Regions Award at The Parliament Magazine's annual MEP Awards.
