= Grzegorz Bierecki =

Polish politician (born 1963)

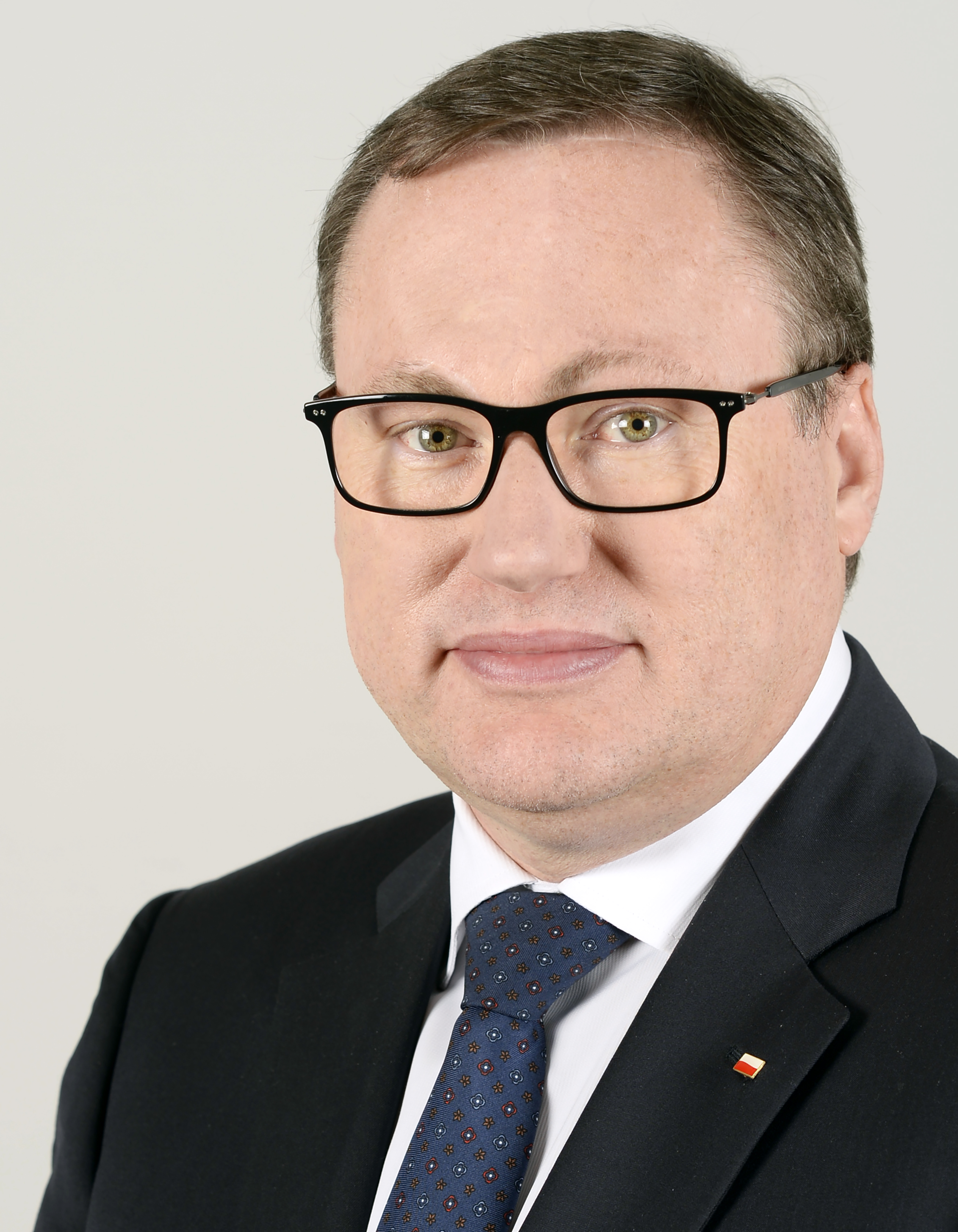
Grzegorz Bierecki

Grzegorz Michał Bierecki (born 28 September 1963) is a Polish politician. He was elected to the Senate of Poland (10th term) representing the constituency of Chełm.
