= Jadwiga Rotnicka =

Polish politician (born 1943)

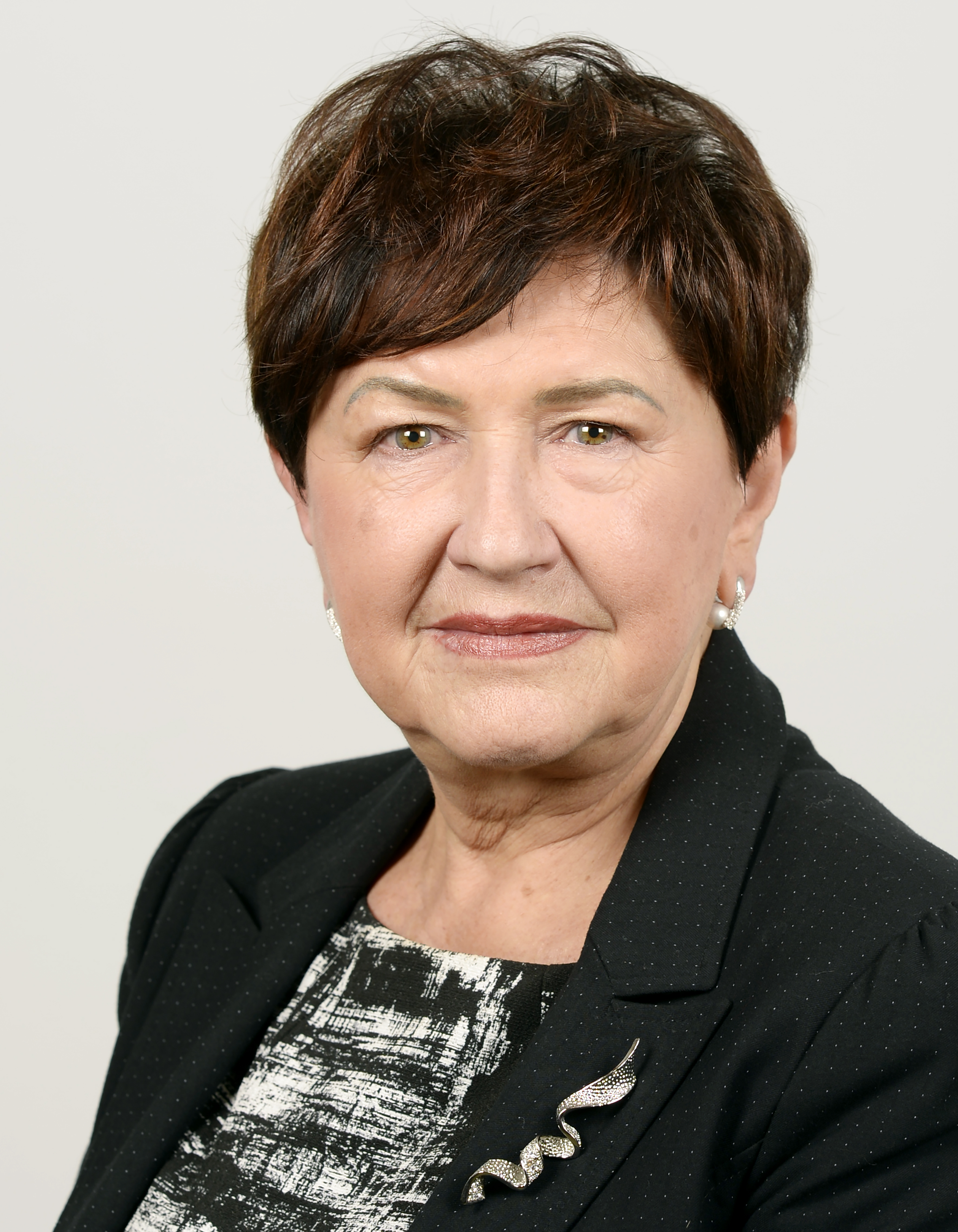

Member of the Senate of Poland

Personal details
- Born: 20 November 1943 (age 82)

Jadwiga Kazimiera Rotnicka (born 20 November 1943) is a Polish politician. She was elected to the Senate of Poland (10th term) representing the constituency of Poznań.
