= Leszek Czarnobaj =

Polish politician (born 1956)

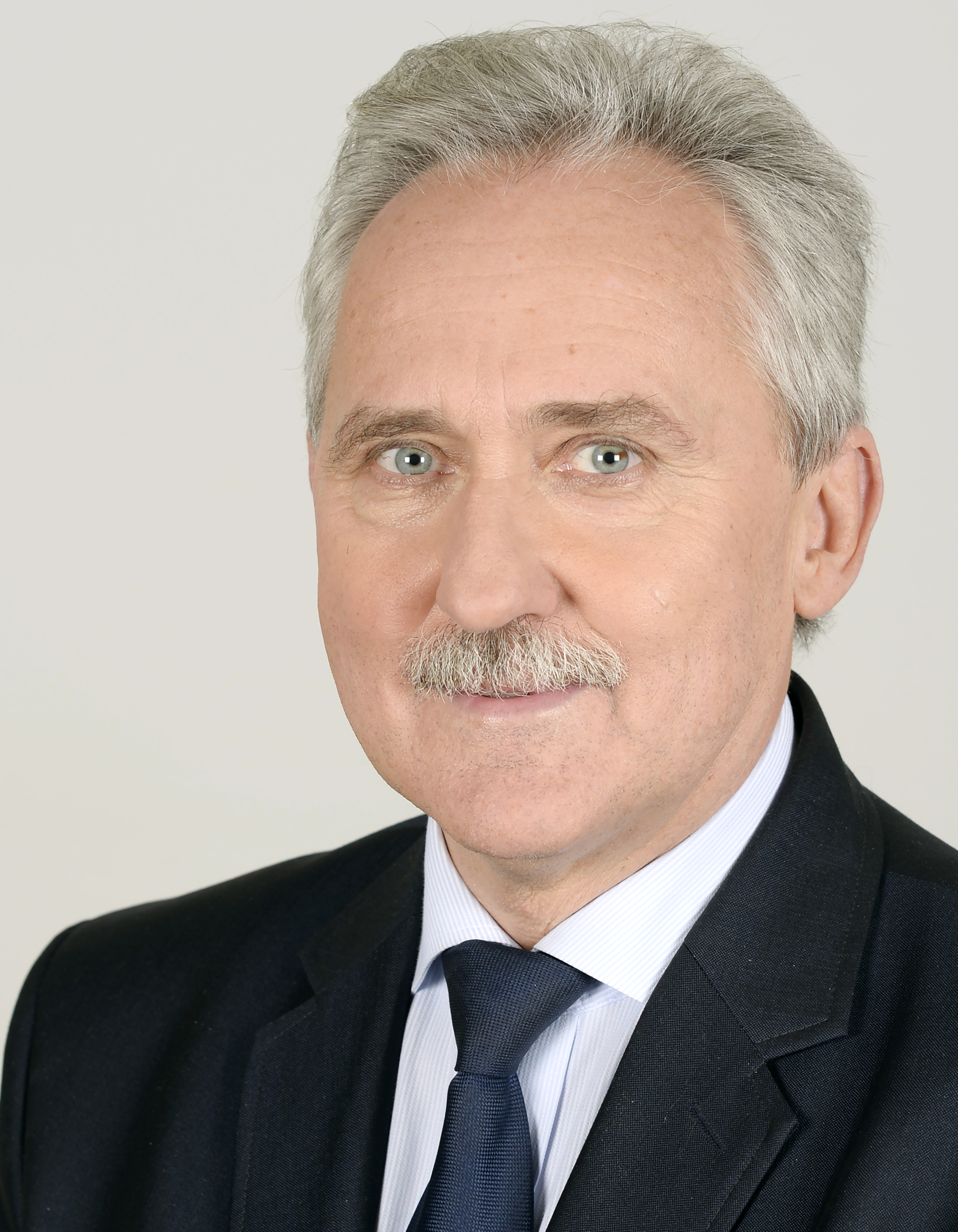

Member of the Senate of Poland

Personal details
- Born: 12 March 1956 (age 70)

Leszek Czarnobaj (born 12 March 1956) is a Polish politician. He was elected to the Senate of Poland (11th term) representing the constituency of Gdańsk. He was also elected to the 8th term (2011–2015), 9th term (2015–2019) and 10th term (2019–2023) of the Senate of Poland.
