= Maciej Łuczak =

Polish politician (born 1967)

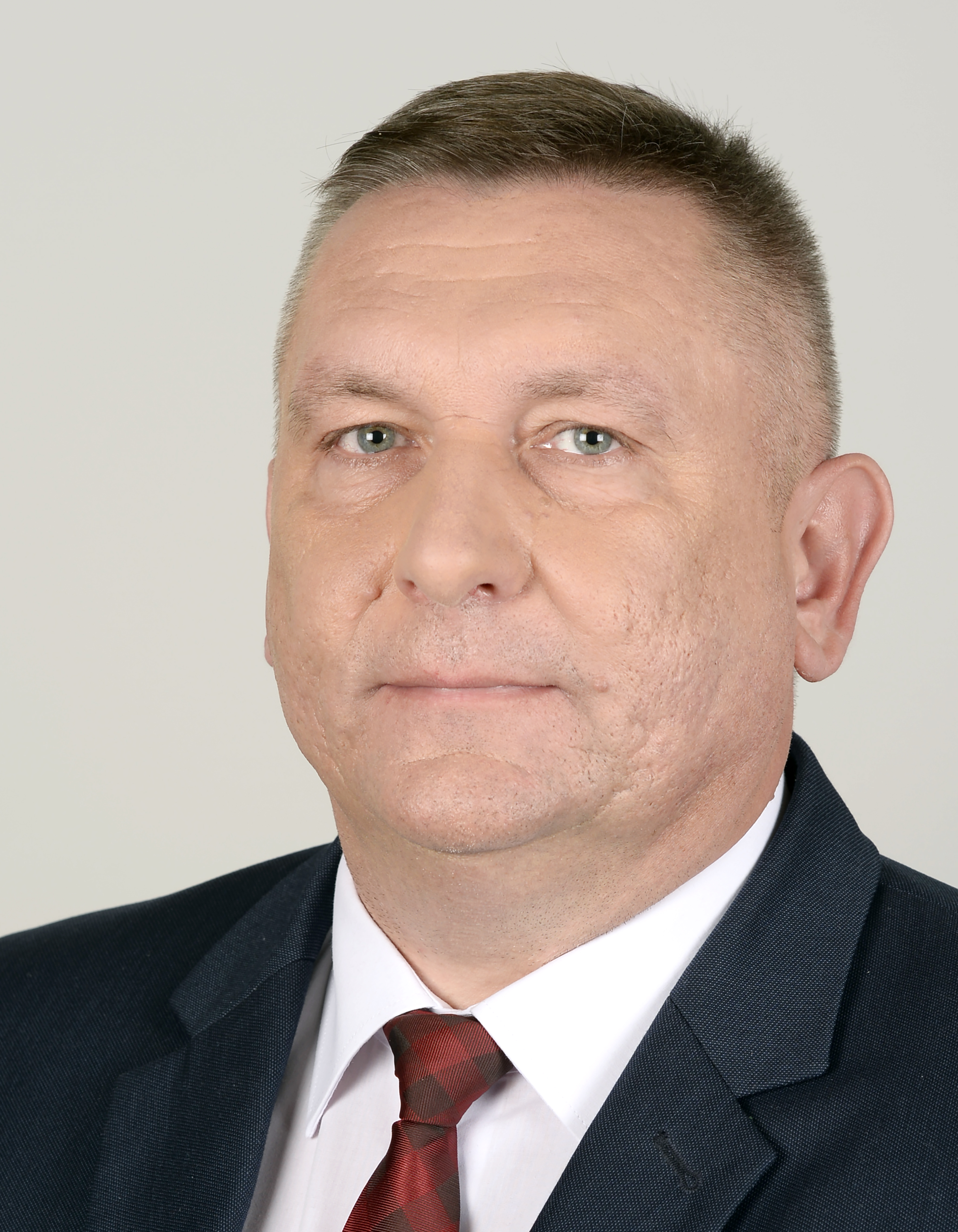
Maciej Łuczak

Maciej Adam Łuczak (born 3 January 1967) is a Polish politician. He was elected to the Senate of Poland (10th term) representing the constituency of Sieradz. He was also elected to the 9th term (2015–2019) of the Senate of Poland.
