= Józef Łyczak =

Polish politician (born 1952)

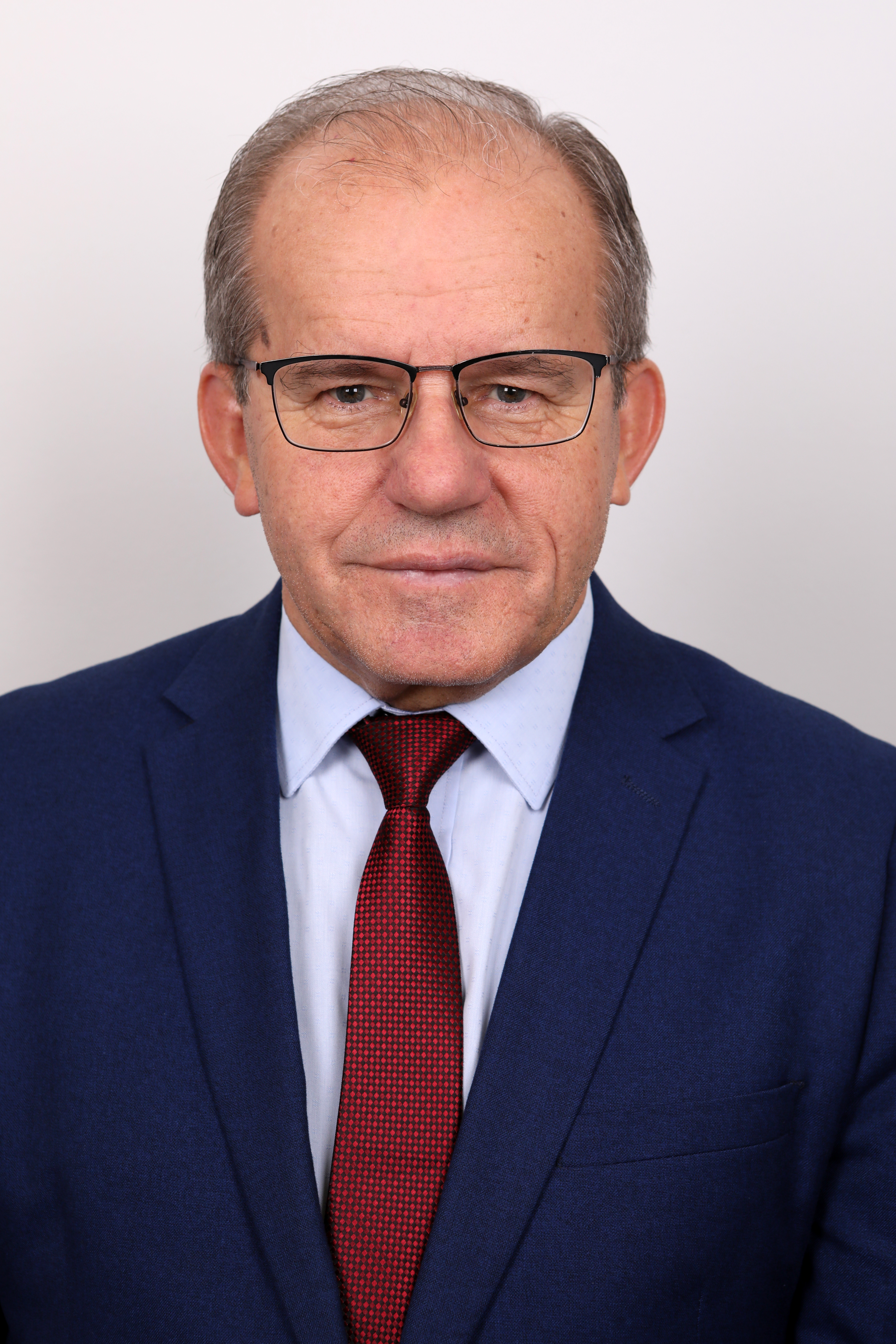
Józef Łyczak in 2019

Józef Mikołaj Łyczak (born 2 January 1952) is a Polish politician. He was elected to the Senate of Poland (10th term) representing the constituency of Toruń. He was also elected to the 9th term of the Senate of Poland.
