= Zdzisław Pupa =

Polish politician (born 1960)

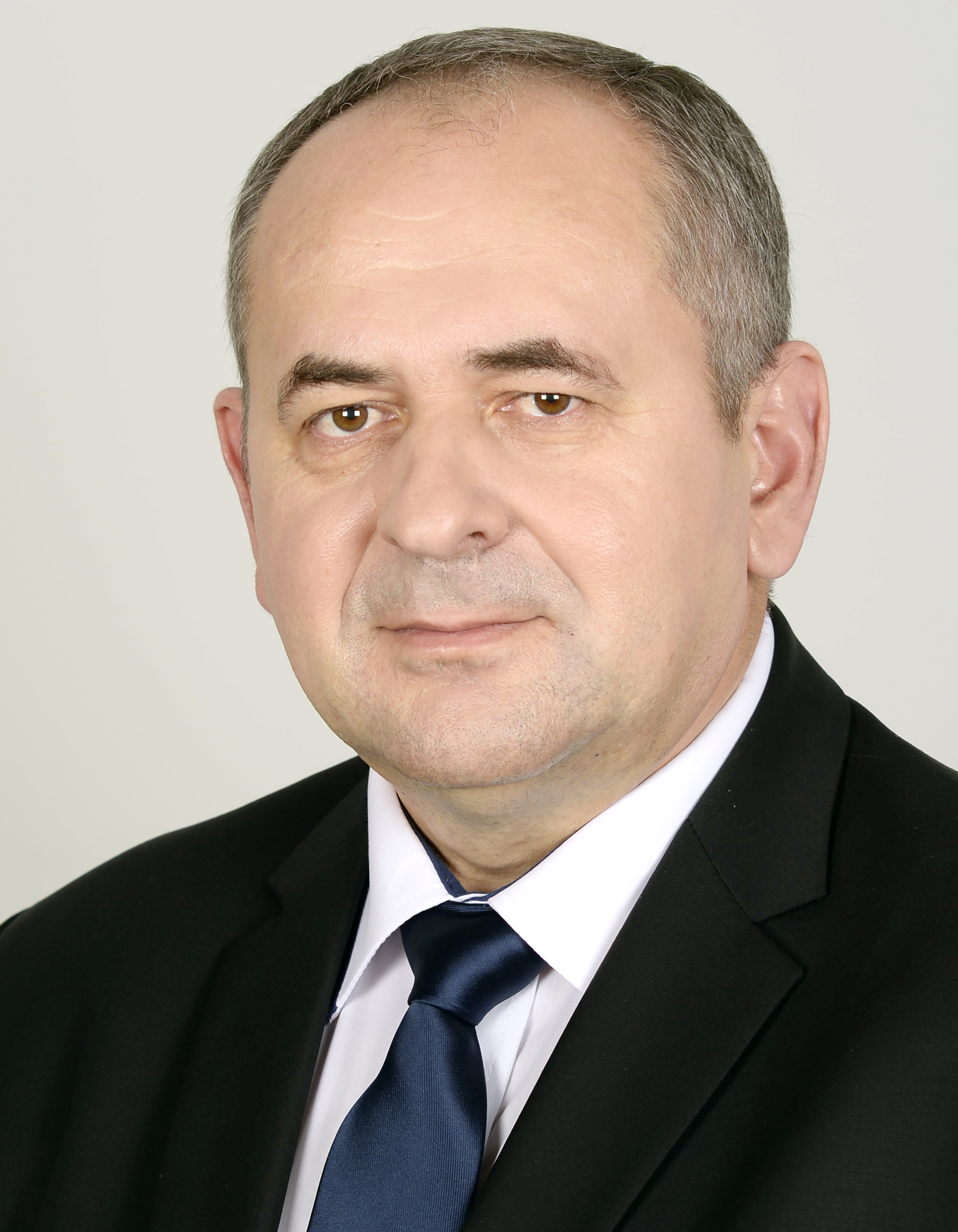
Zdzisław Pupa

Zdzisław Stanisław Pupa (born 11 April 1960) is a Polish politician. He was elected to the Senate of Poland (10th term) representing the constituency of Rzeszów.
