= Jerzy Chróścikowski =

Polish politician (born 1953)

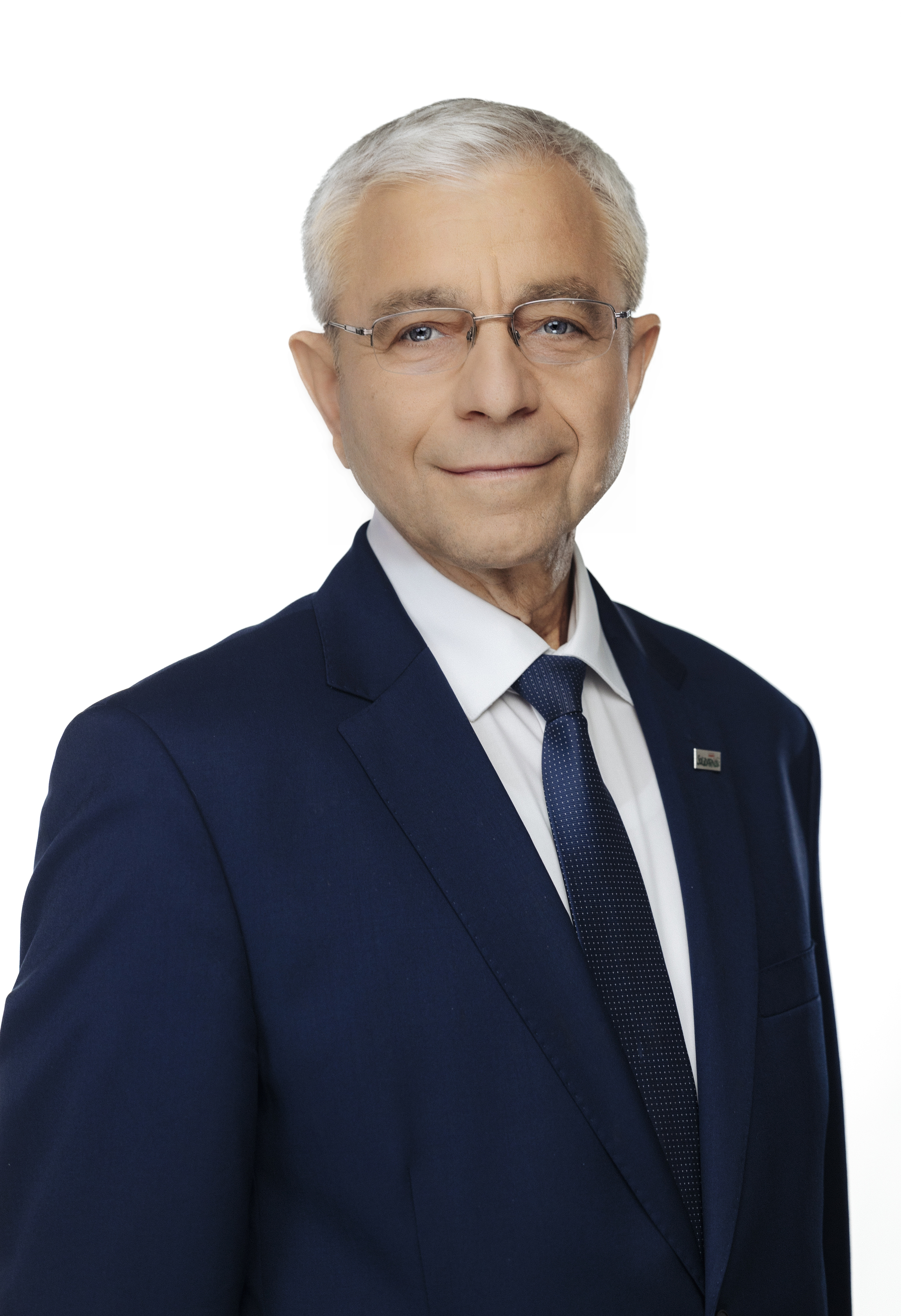
Jerzy Chróścikowski (2023)

Jerzy Mieczysław Chróścikowski (born 24 August 1953) is a Polish politician. He was elected to the Senate of Poland (10th term) representing the constituency of Chełm.
