= Dorota Czudowska =

Polish politician (born 1953)

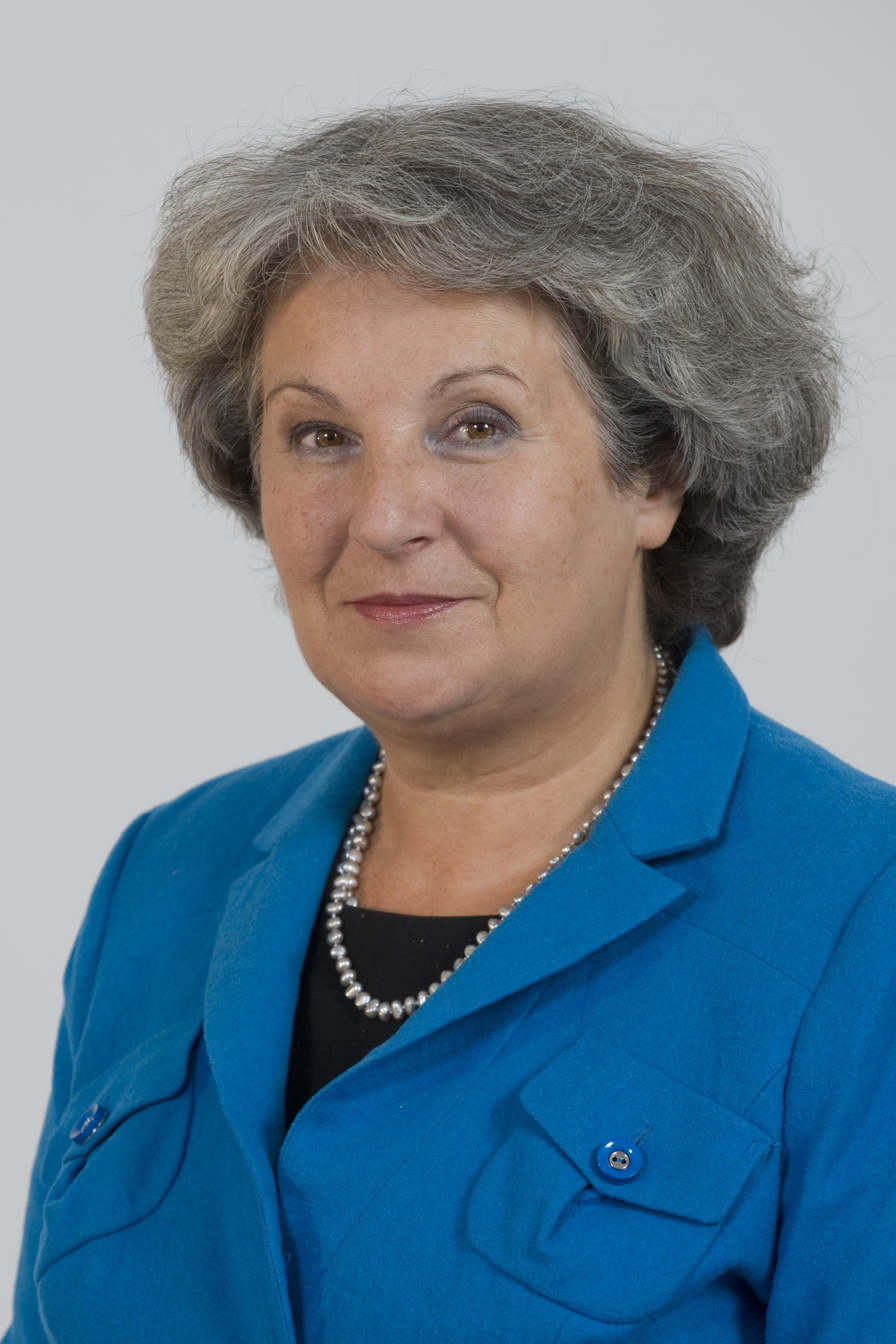

Member of the Senate of Poland

Personal details
- Born: 2 February 1953 (age 73)

Dorota Czudowska (born 2 February 1953) is a Polish politician. She was elected to the Senate of Poland (10th term) representing the constituency of Legnica.
