= Aleksander Szwed =

Polish politician (born 1982)

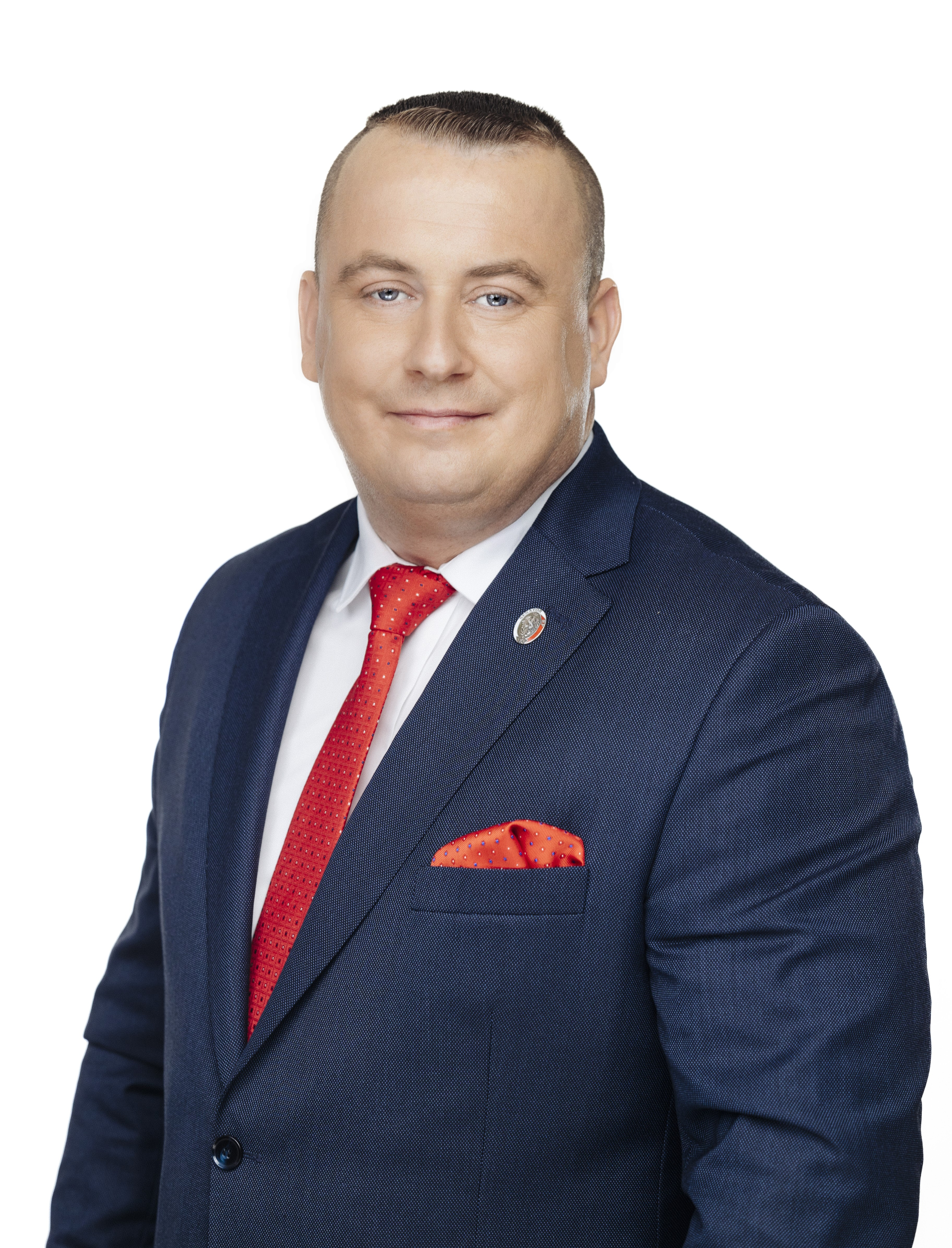
Aleksander Szwed

Aleksander Jakub Szwed (born 22 October 1982) is a Polish politician. He was elected to the Senate of Poland (10th term) representing the constituency of Wałbrzych. He was also elected to the 9th term of the Senate of Poland.
