= Barbara Zdrojewska =

Polish politician (born 1960)

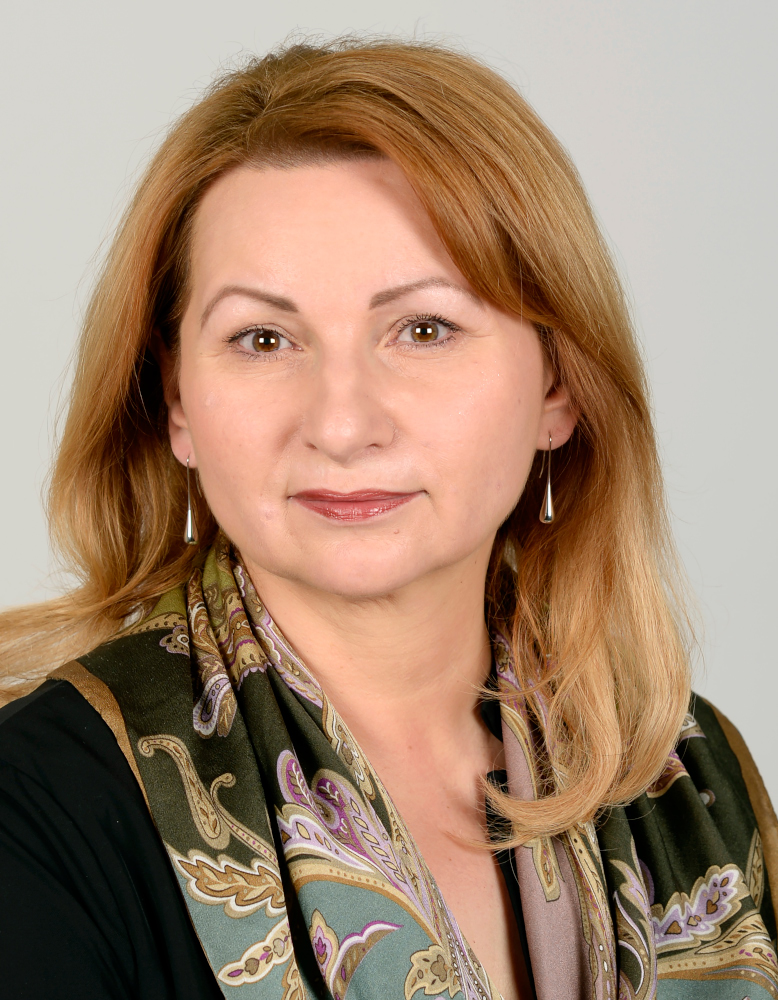

Member of the Senate of Poland

Personal details
- Born: 30 May 1960 (age 65) Legnica, Polish People's Republic

Barbara Grażyna Zdrojewska (born 30 May 1960) is a Polish politician. She was elected to the Senate of Poland (10th term) representing the constituency of Wrocław.
