= Bogusława Orzechowska =

Polish politician (born 1957)

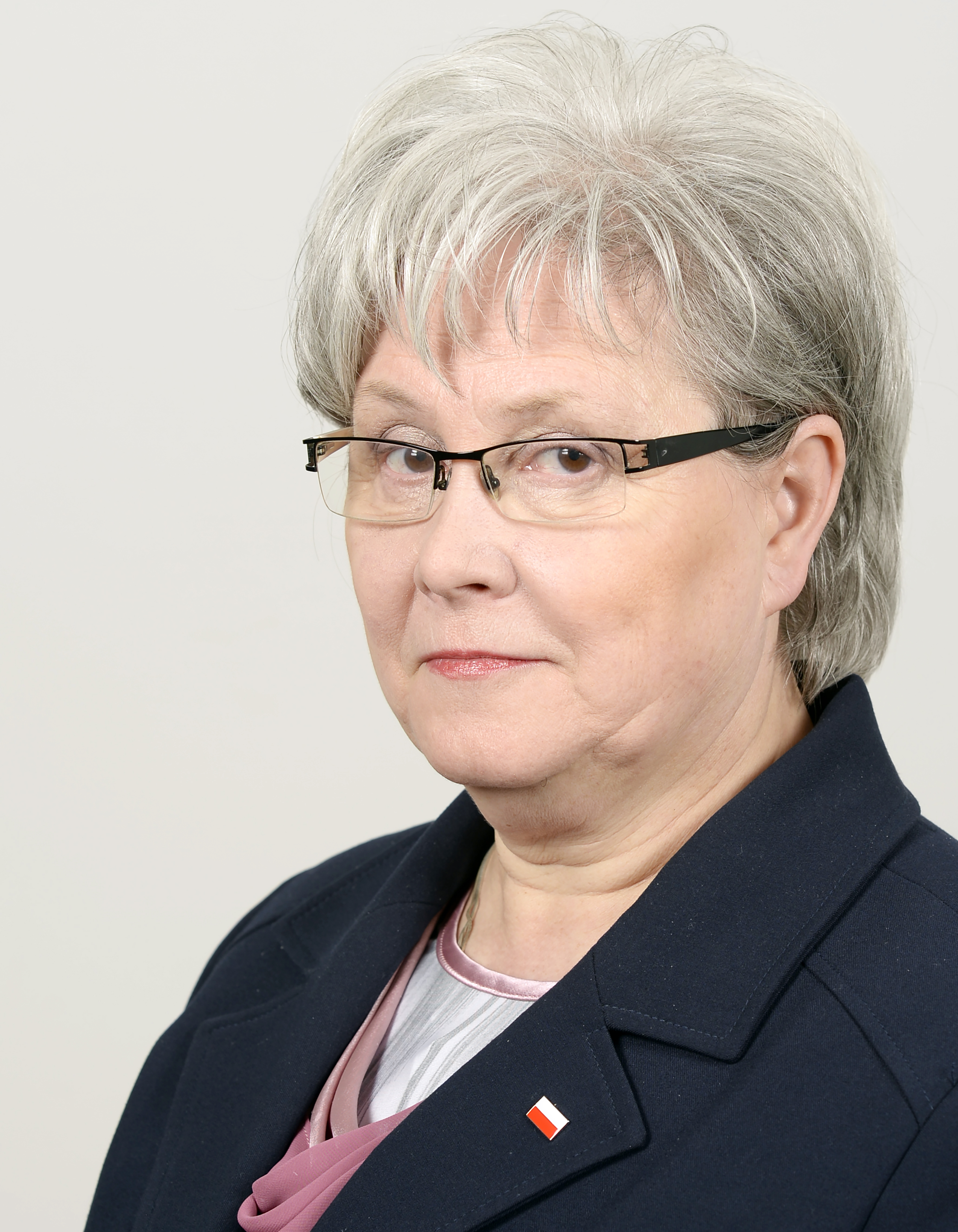

Member of the Senate of Poland

Personal details
- Born: 1 February 1957 (age 69)

Bogusława Orzechowska (born 1 February 1957) is a Polish politician. She was elected to the Senate of Poland (10th term) representing the constituency of Elbląg. She was also elected to the 9th term (2015–2019) of the Senate of Poland.
