= Barbara Borys-Damięcka =

Polish politician (1937–2023)

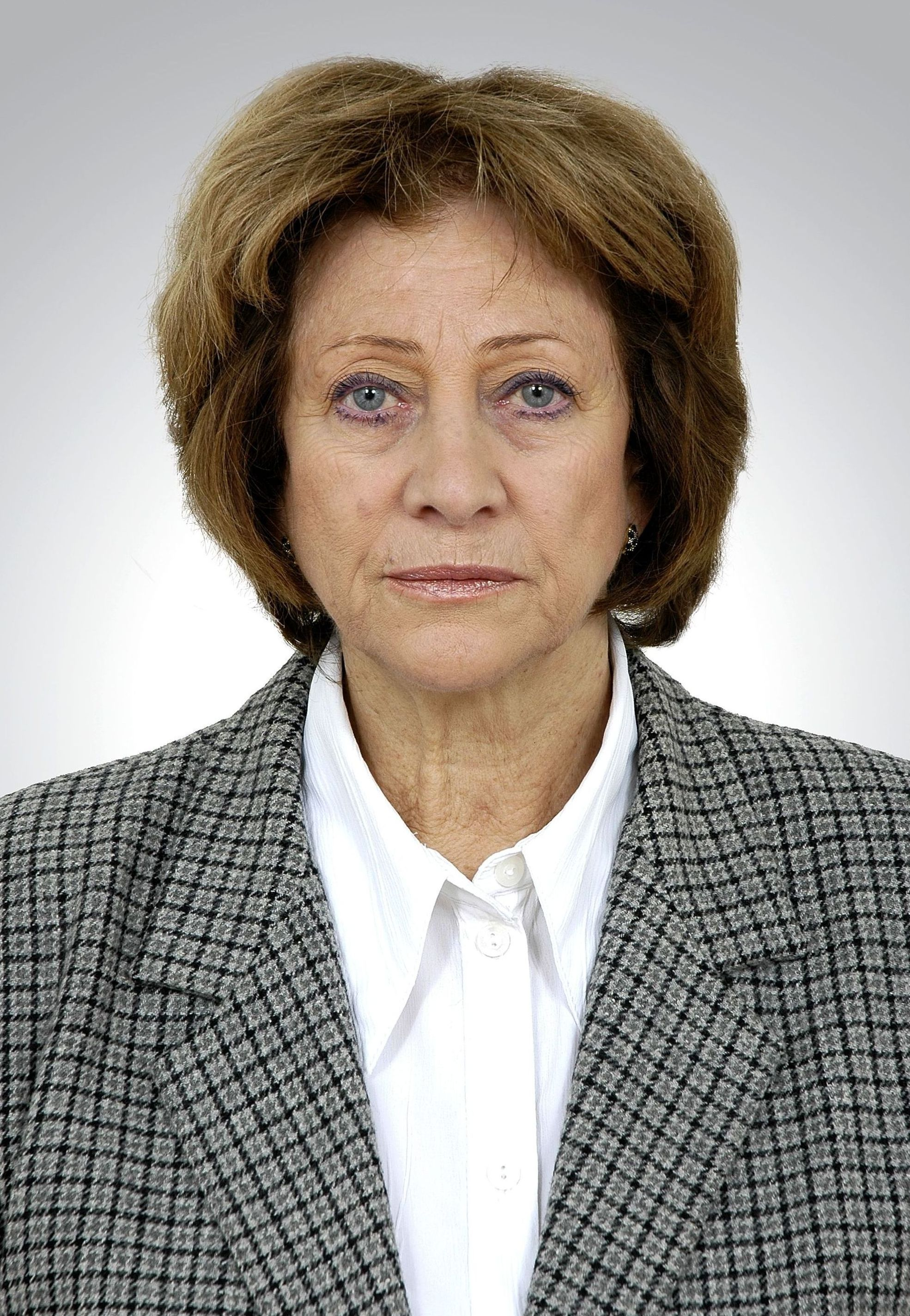

Member of the Senate
- In office 5 November 2007 – 9 June 2023

Personal details
- Born: 2 November 1937; Warsaw, Poland
- Died: 9 June 2023 (aged 85); Warsaw, Poland
- Profession: Theatre director, television director

Barbara Borys-Damięcka (2 November 1937 – 9 June 2023) was a Polish politician, theatre and television director.

Borys-Damięcka was elected to the Senate of Poland (10th term) representing the constituency of Warsaw. She also served in the 7th, 8th and 9th terms of the Senate of Poland.

Borys-Damięcka died on 9 June 2023, at the age of 85.

== Electoral results ==
Election	Body	Term	Electoral list	Constituency	Result (Note: Favorable votes in the constituency.)	Seat	Ref.
2004	European Parliament	6th	Initiative for Poland	Warsaw (4th)	6,892 / 652,682 (1%)	No	
2007	Senate	7th	Civic Platform	Warsaw I (18th)	605,972 / 1,144,318 (53%)	Yes	
2011	Senate	8th	Civic Platform	44th	196,735 / 314,832 (62%)	Yes	
2015	Senate	9th	Civic Platform	44th	164,796 / 379,618 (43%)	Yes	
2019	Senate	10th	Civic Coalition	43rd	157,359 / 296,473 (53%)	Yes	
