= Wojciech Piecha =

Polish politician (born 1958)

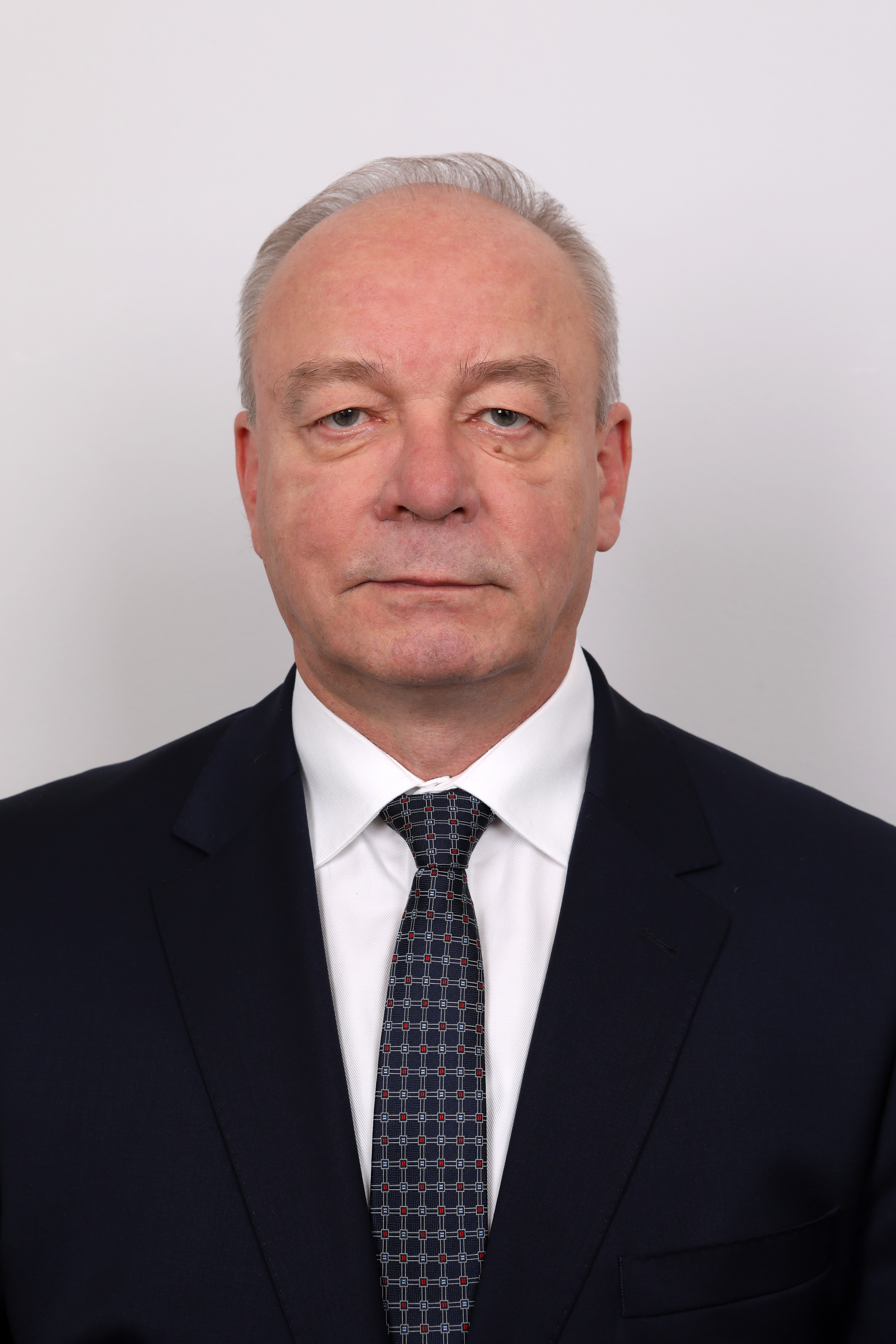

Member of the Senate of Poland

Personal details
- Born: 13 February 1958 (age 68)

Wojciech Piotr Piecha (born 13 February 1958) is a Polish politician. He was elected to the Senate of Poland (10th term) representing the constituency of Bielsko-Biała. He was also elected to the 9th term (2015–2019) of the Senate of Poland.
