= Władysław Komarnicki =

Polish politician (born 1945)

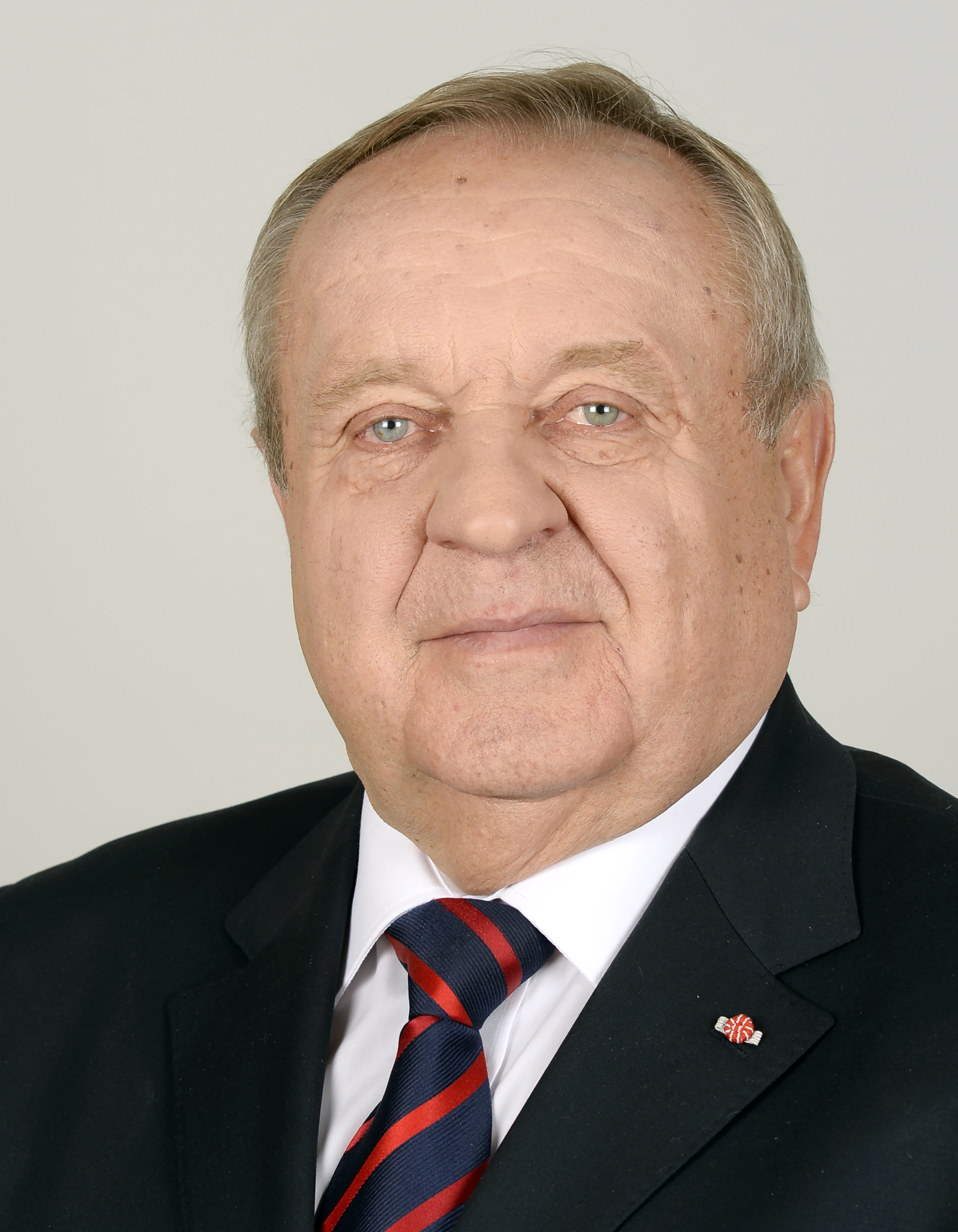
Władysław Komarnicki

Władysław Komarnicki (born 13 July 1945) is a Polish politician. He was elected to the Senate of Poland (10th term) representing the constituency of Zielona Góra. He was also elected to the 9th term (2015–2019) of the Senate of Poland.
