= Jerzy Wcisła =

Polish politician (born 1958)

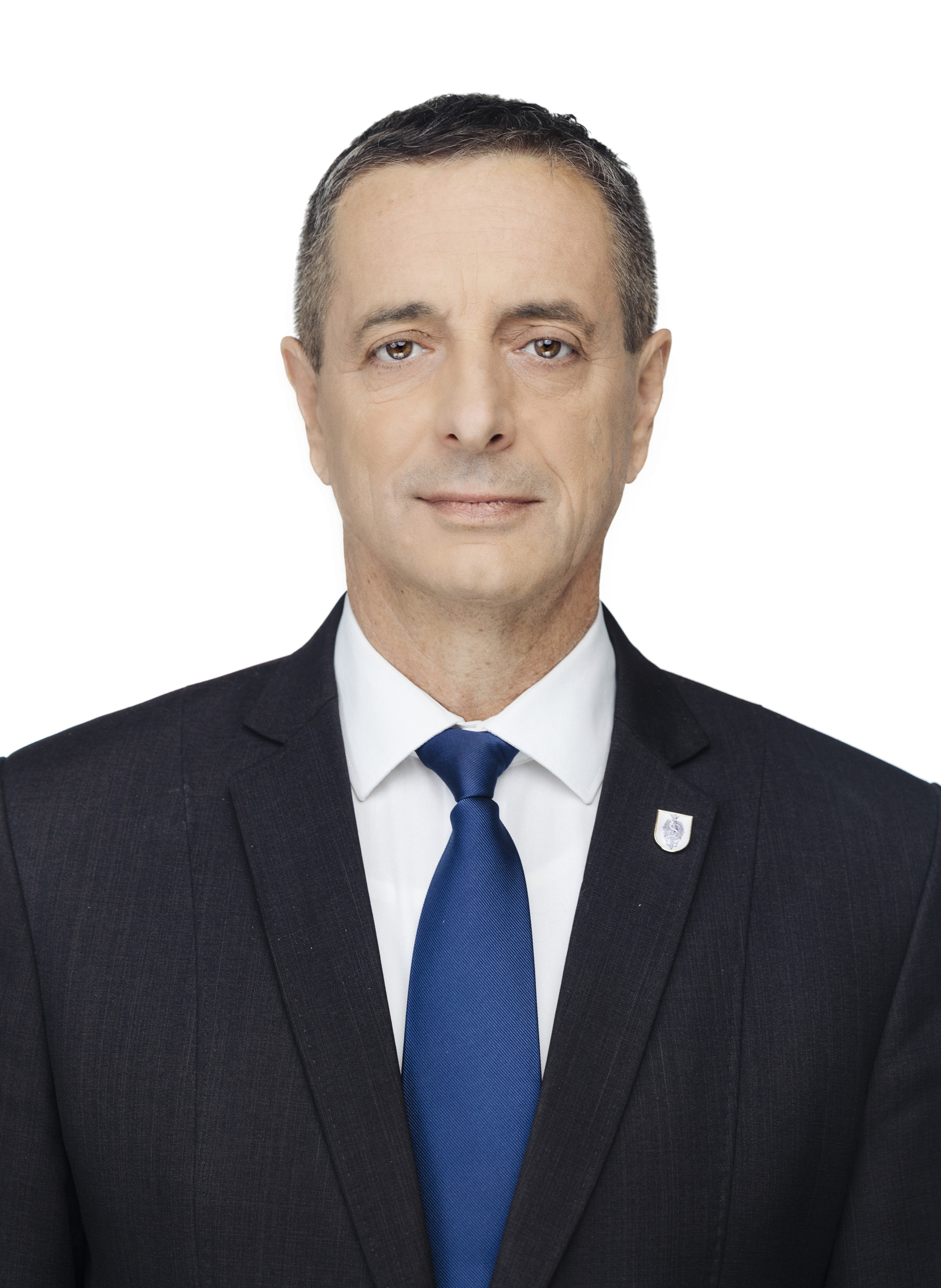

Member of the Senate of Poland

Personal details
- Born: 9 November 1958 (age 67)

Jerzy Wcisła (born 9 November 1958) is a Polish politician. He was elected to the Senate of Poland (10th term) representing the constituency of Elbląg. He was also elected to the 9th term (2015–2019) of the Senate of Poland.
