= Aleksander Pociej =

Polish politician (born 1965)

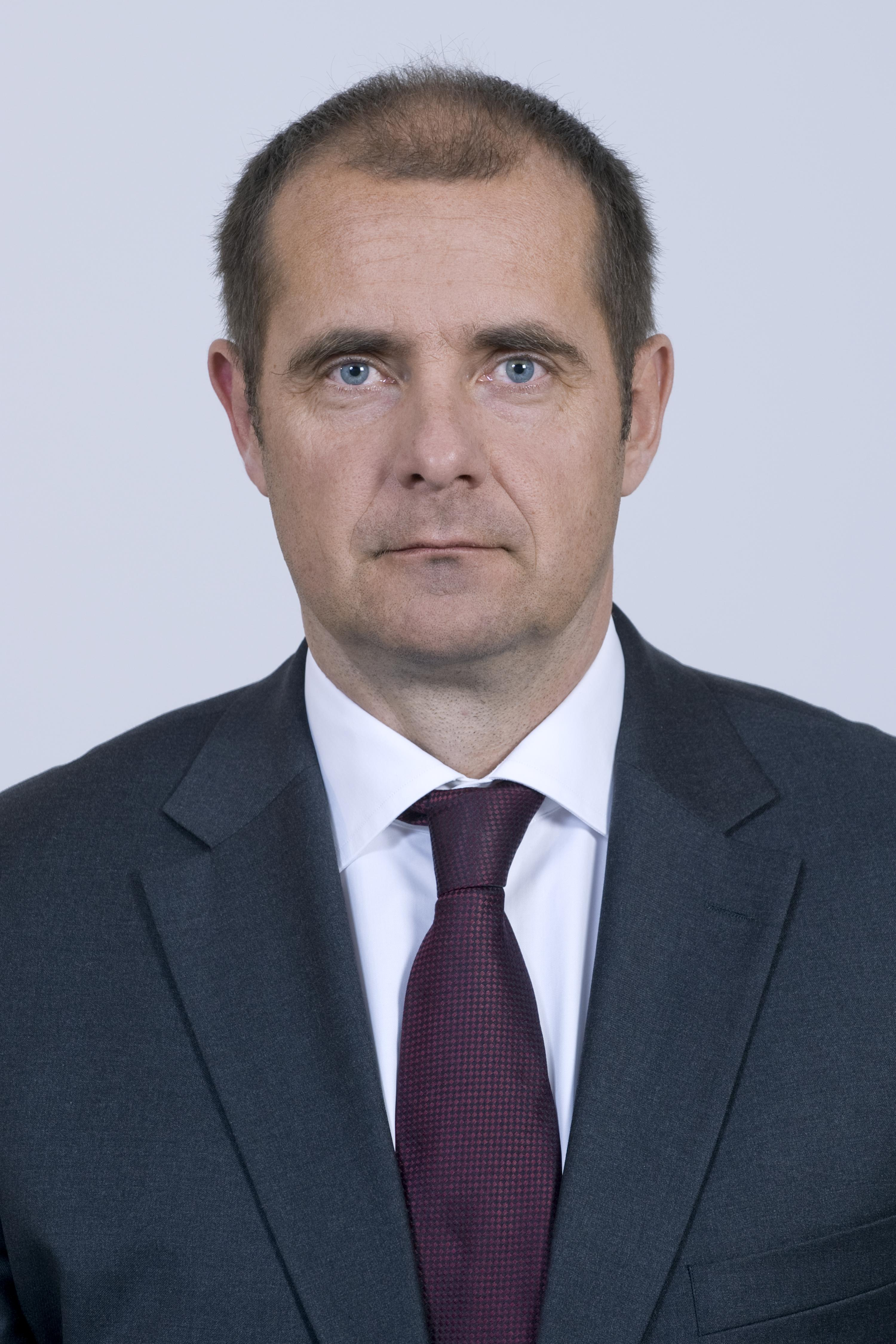
Aleksander Pociej

Aleksander August Pociej (born 7 February 1965 in Warsaw) is a Polish lawyer, politician and diplomat. He was elected to the Senate of Poland (8th, 9th and 10th term) representing the constituency of Warsaw.

Between November 2024 and 2026 he was acting Permanent Representative of Poland to the Council of Europe.
