= Robert Mamątow =

Polish politician (born 1957)

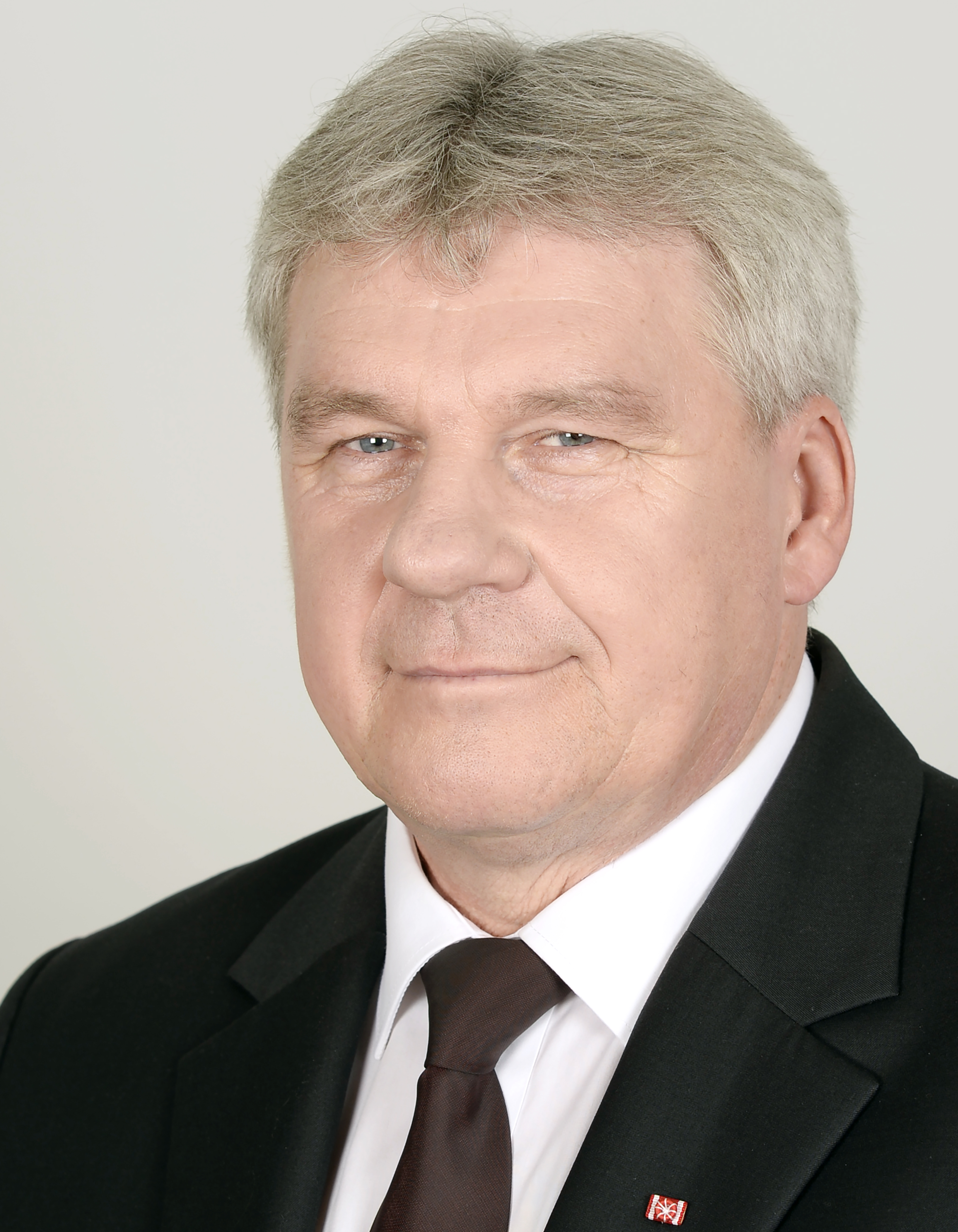
Robert Mamątow

Robert Adam Mamątow (born 19 December 1957) is a Polish politician. He was elected to the Senate of Poland (10th term) representing the constituency of Siedlce. He was also elected to the 8th term (2011–2015) and 9th term (2015–2019) of the Senate of Poland.
