= Janina Sagatowska =

Polish politician (born 1950)

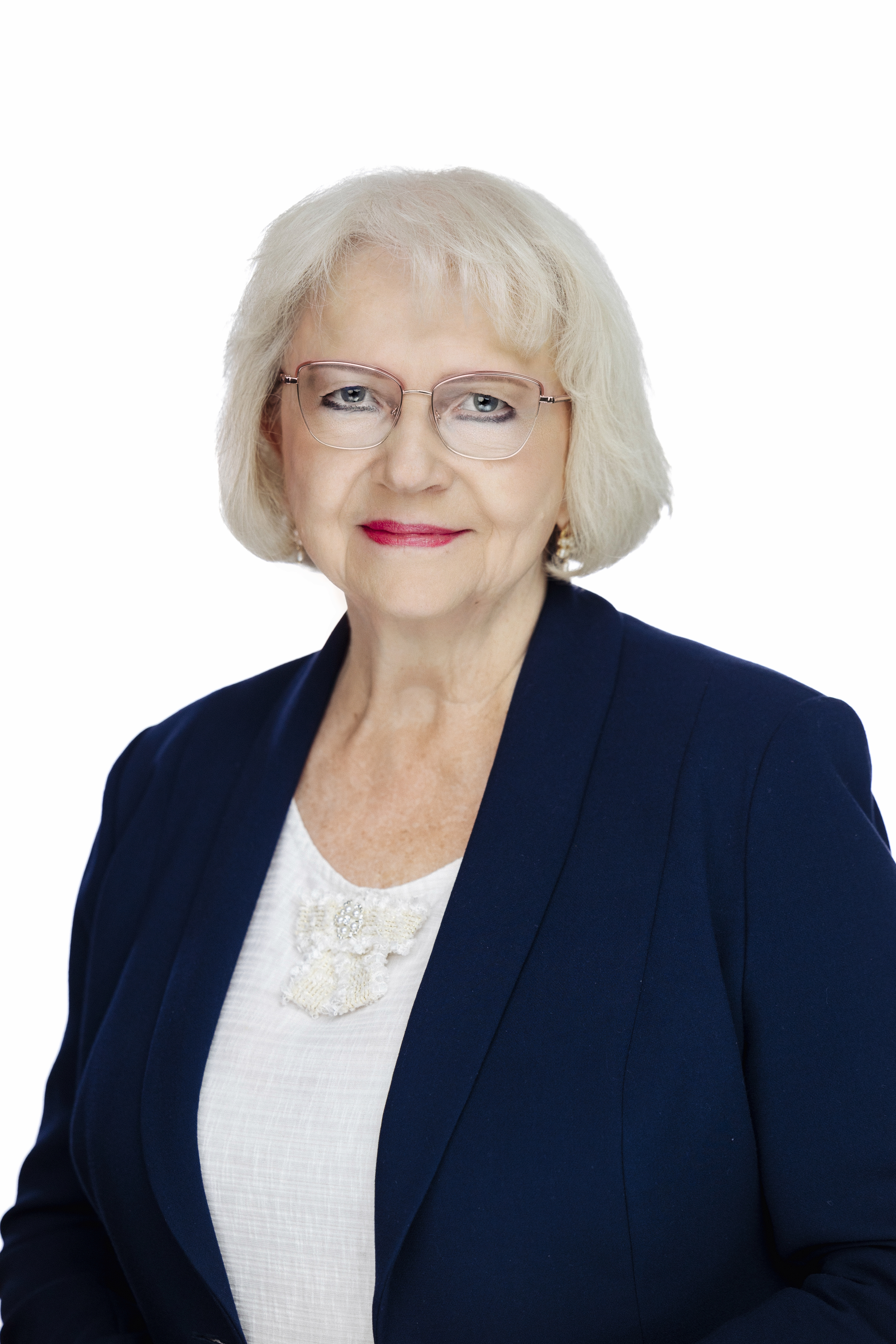

Member of the Senate of Poland

Personal details
- Born: 16 May 1950 (age 75)

Janina Zofia Sagatowska (born 16 May 1950) is a Polish politician. She was elected to the Senate of Poland (10th term) representing the constituency of Rzeszów. She was also elected to the 11th term.
