= Rafał Ambrozik =

Polish politician (born 1979)

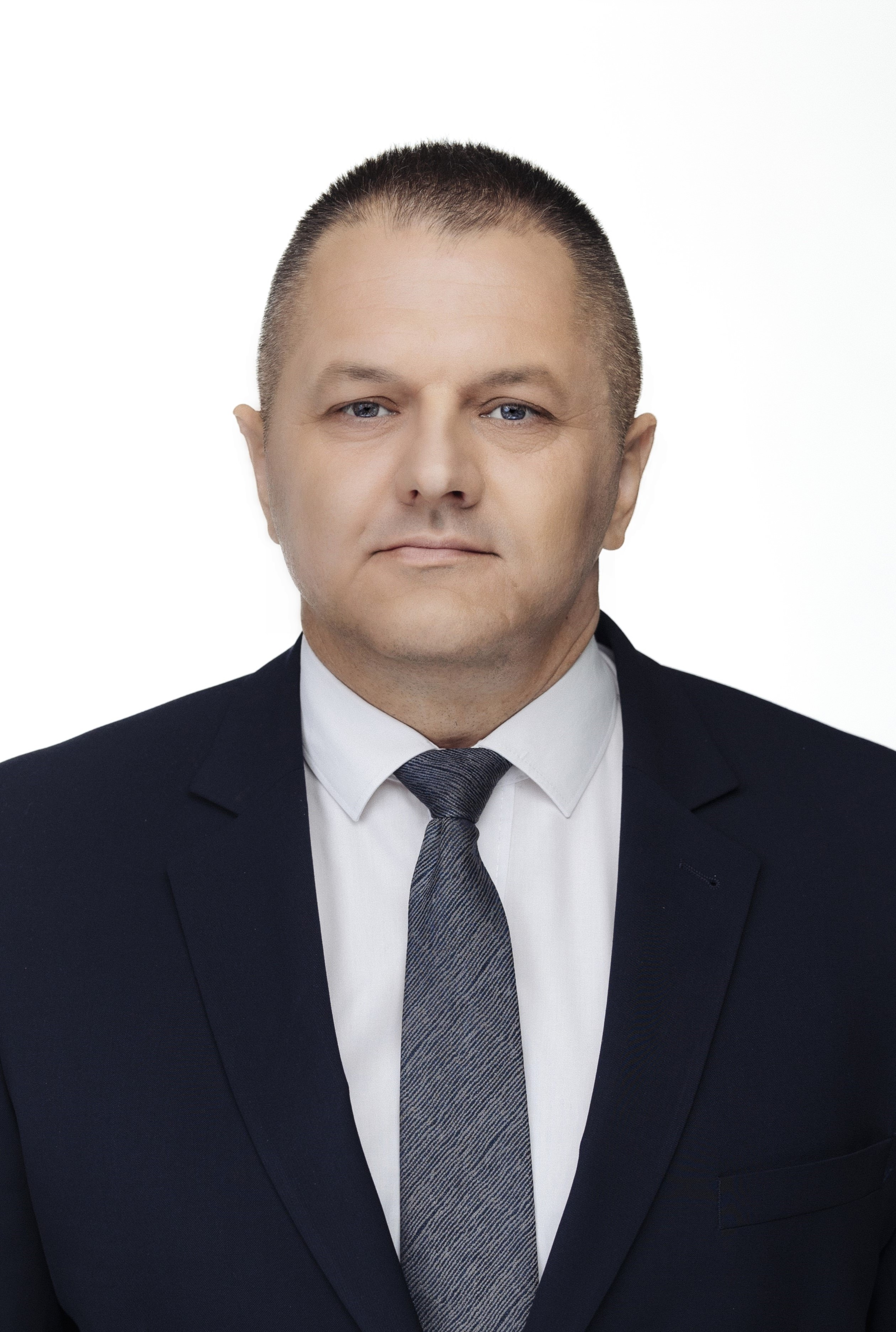
Rafał Ambrozik (2023)

Rafał Michał Ambrozik (born 8 December 1979) is a Polish politician. He was elected to the Senate of Poland (10th term) representing the constituency of Piotrków Trybunalski. He was also elected to the 11th term.

He was born in Rawa Mazowiecka.
