= Przemysław Błaszczyk =

Polish politician (born 1977)

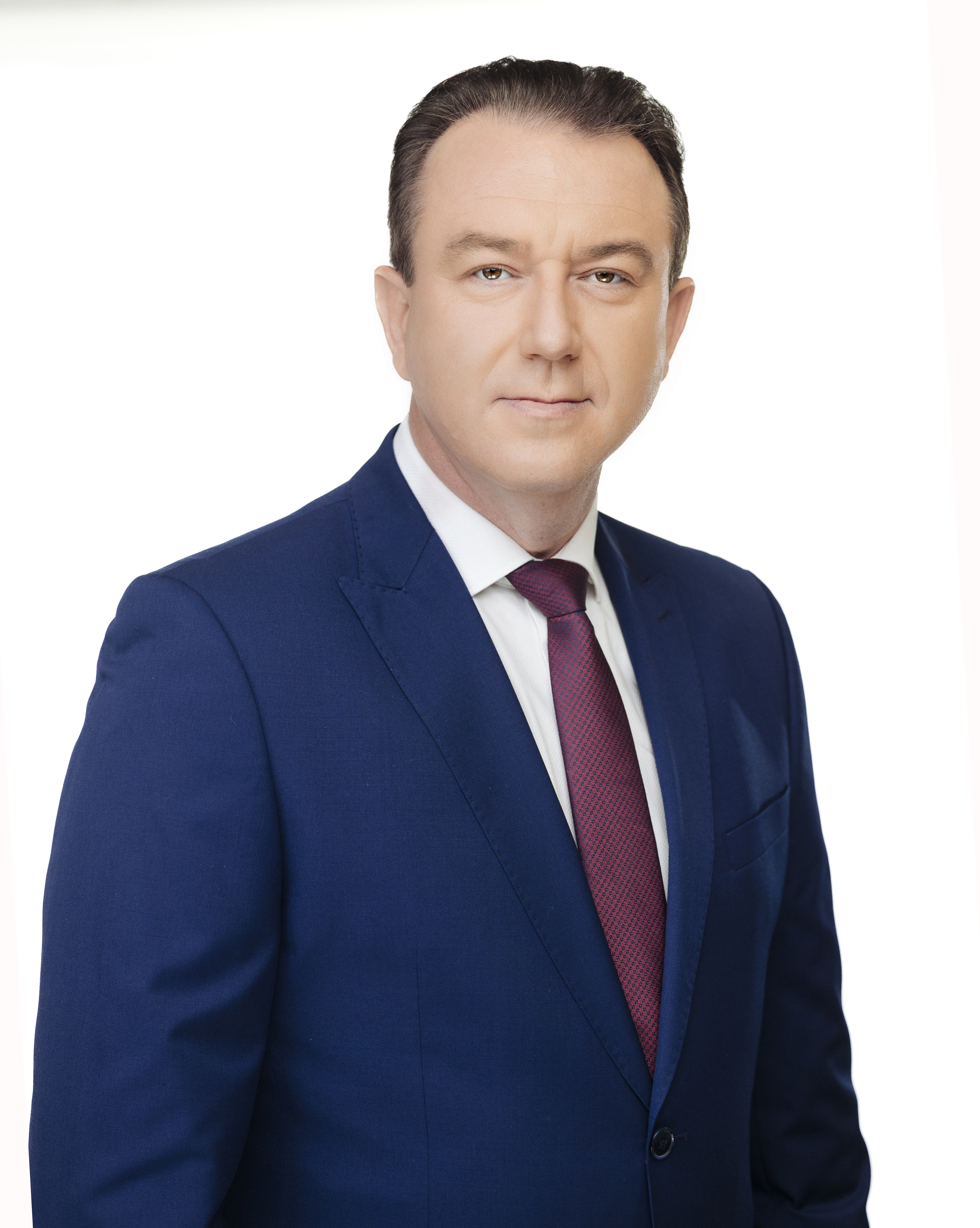
Przemysław Błaszczyk (2023)

Przemysław Jacek Błaszczyk (born 11 September 1977) is a Polish politician. He was elected to the Senate of Poland (10th term) representing the constituency of Sieradz. He was also elected to the 11th term.
