= Robert Dowhan =

Polish politician (born 1967)

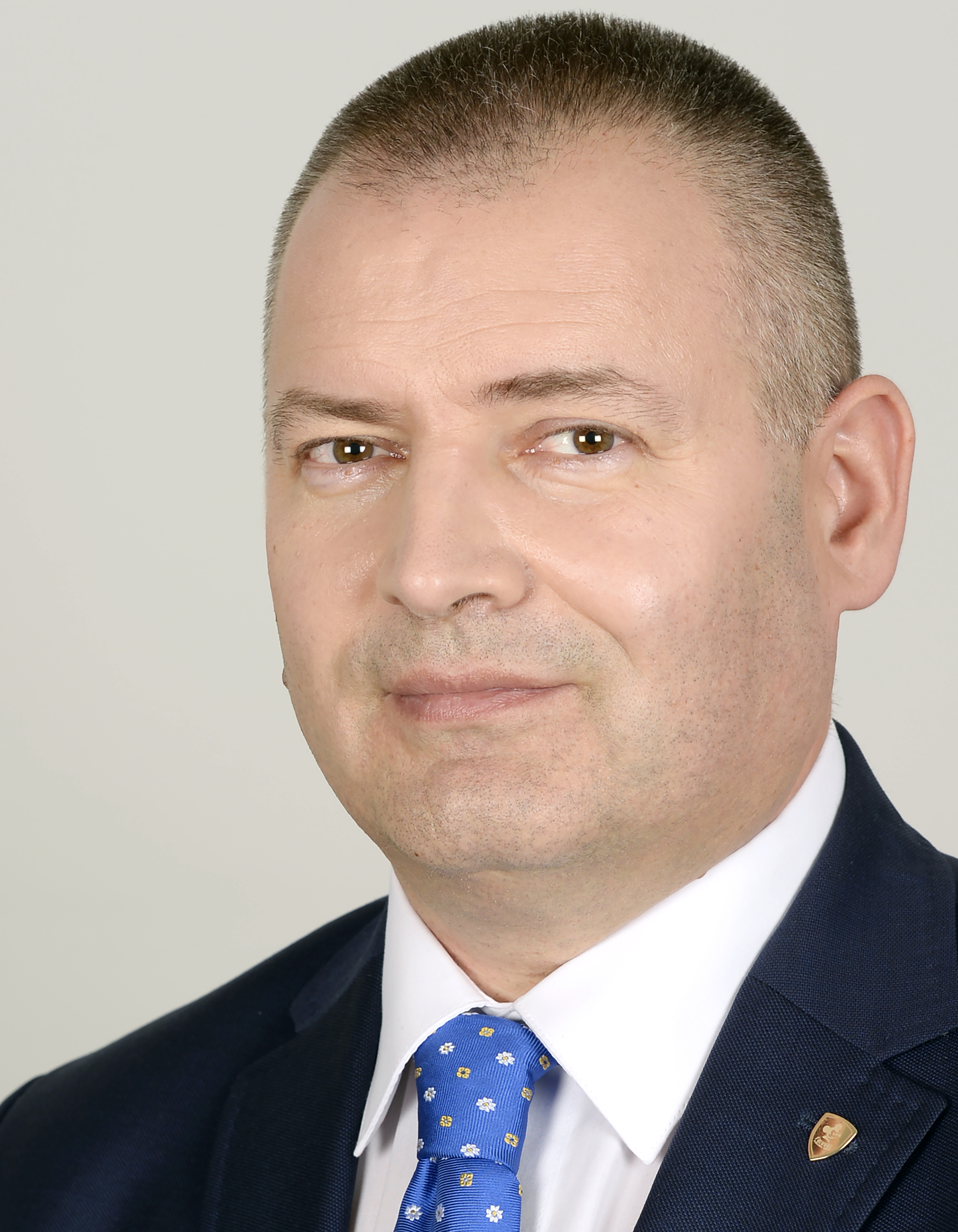
Robert Dowhan

Robert Dowhan (born 14 July 1967) is a Polish politician from the Civic Coalition. He was elected to the Senate of Poland (10th term) representing the constituency of Zielona Góra. He was also elected to the 8th term (2011–2015) and 9th term (2015–2019) of the Senate of Poland.

In the 2023 Polish parliamentary election he was elected to the Sejm from Zielona Góra.
