= Wiesław Dobkowski =

Polish politician (born 1953)

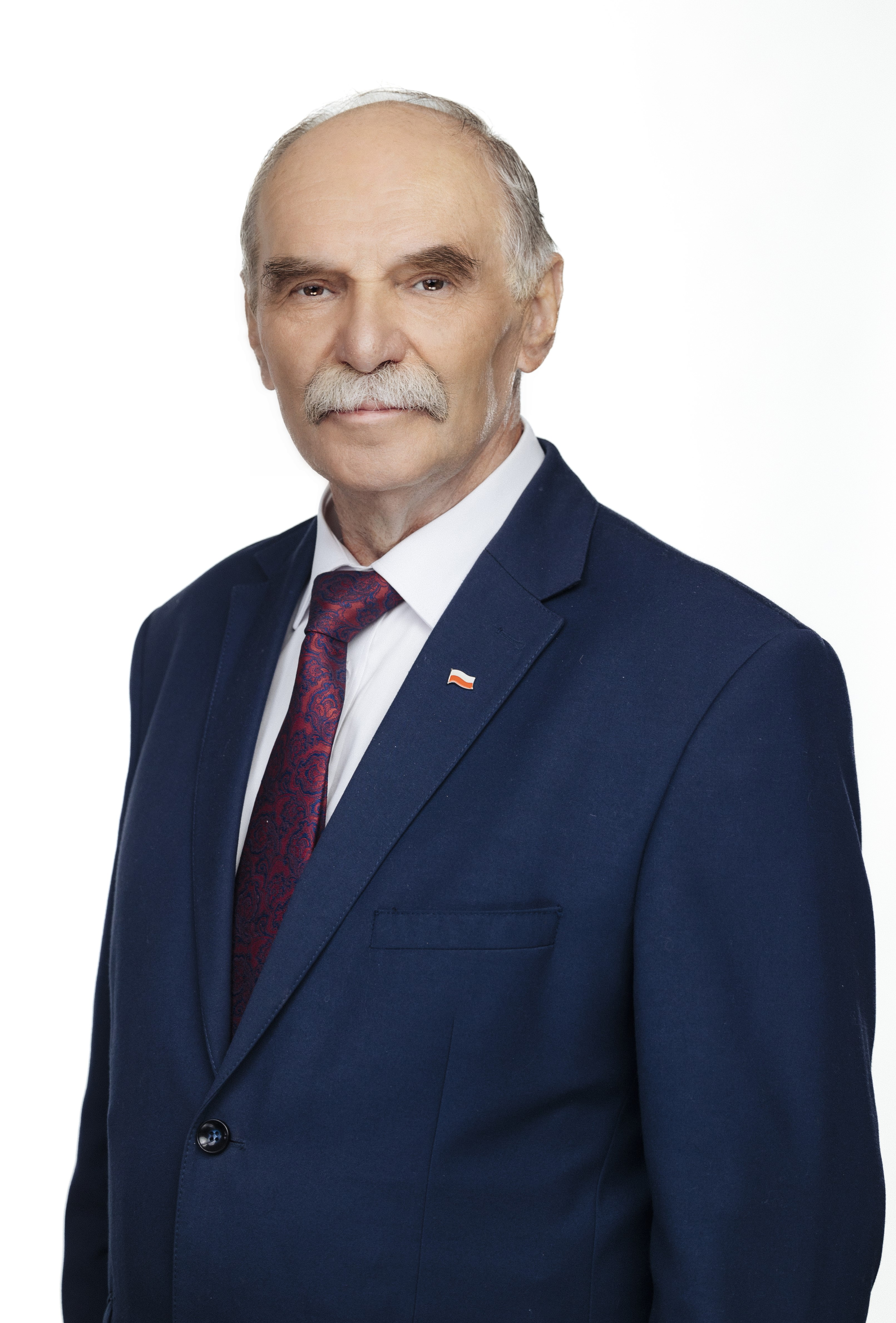
Wiesław Dobkowski (2023)

Wiesław Józef Dobkowski (born 2 January 1953) is a Polish politician. He was elected to the Senate of Poland (10th term) representing the constituency of Piotrków Trybunalski. He was also elected to the 11th term.
