= Margareta Budner =

Polish politician (born 1975)

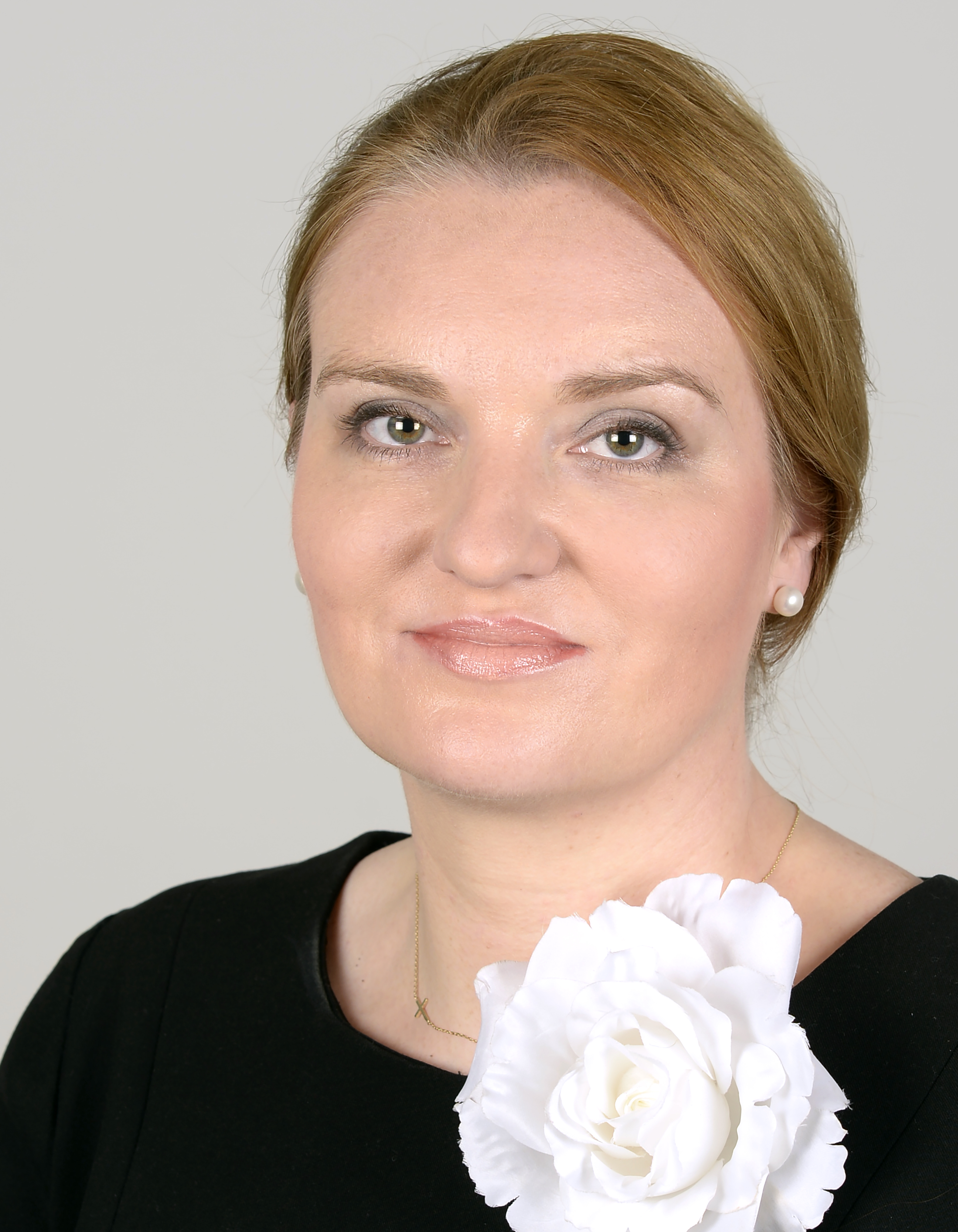
- Budner in 2015

Member of the Senate of Poland

Personal details
- Born: 11 June 1975 (age 50)

Margareta Budner (born 11 June 1975) is a Polish politician. She was elected to the Senate of Poland (10th term) representing the constituency of Konin. She was also elected to the 6th term and 9th term of the Senate of Poland.
