= Marek Martynowski =

Polish politician (born 1970)

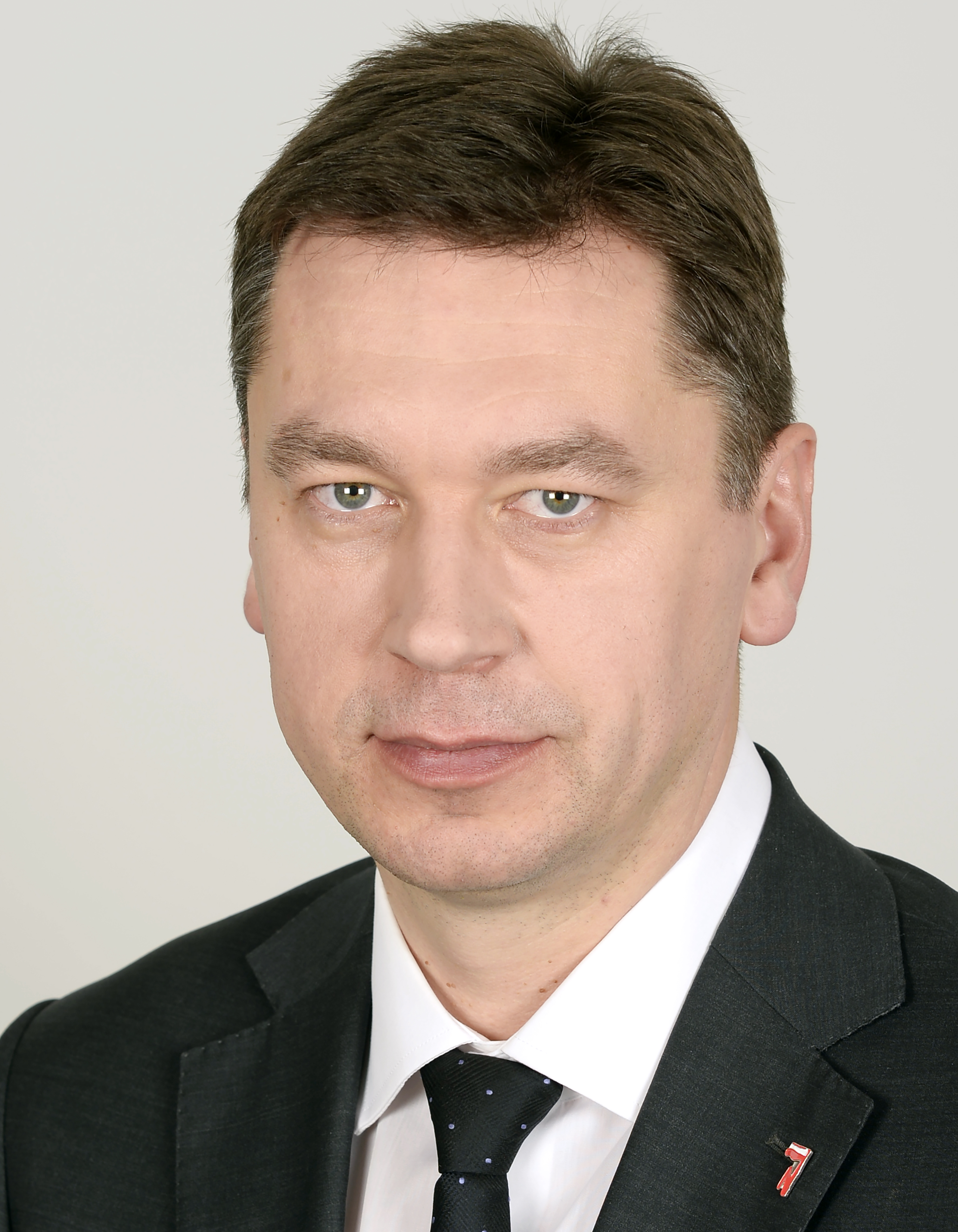
Marek Martynowski

Marek Eryk Martynowski (born 2 August 1970) is a Polish politician. He was elected to the Senate of Poland (10th term) representing the constituency of Płock. He was also elected to the 8th term (2011–2015) and 9th term (2015–2019) of the Senate of Poland.
