= Andrzej Pająk =

Polish politician (born 1955)

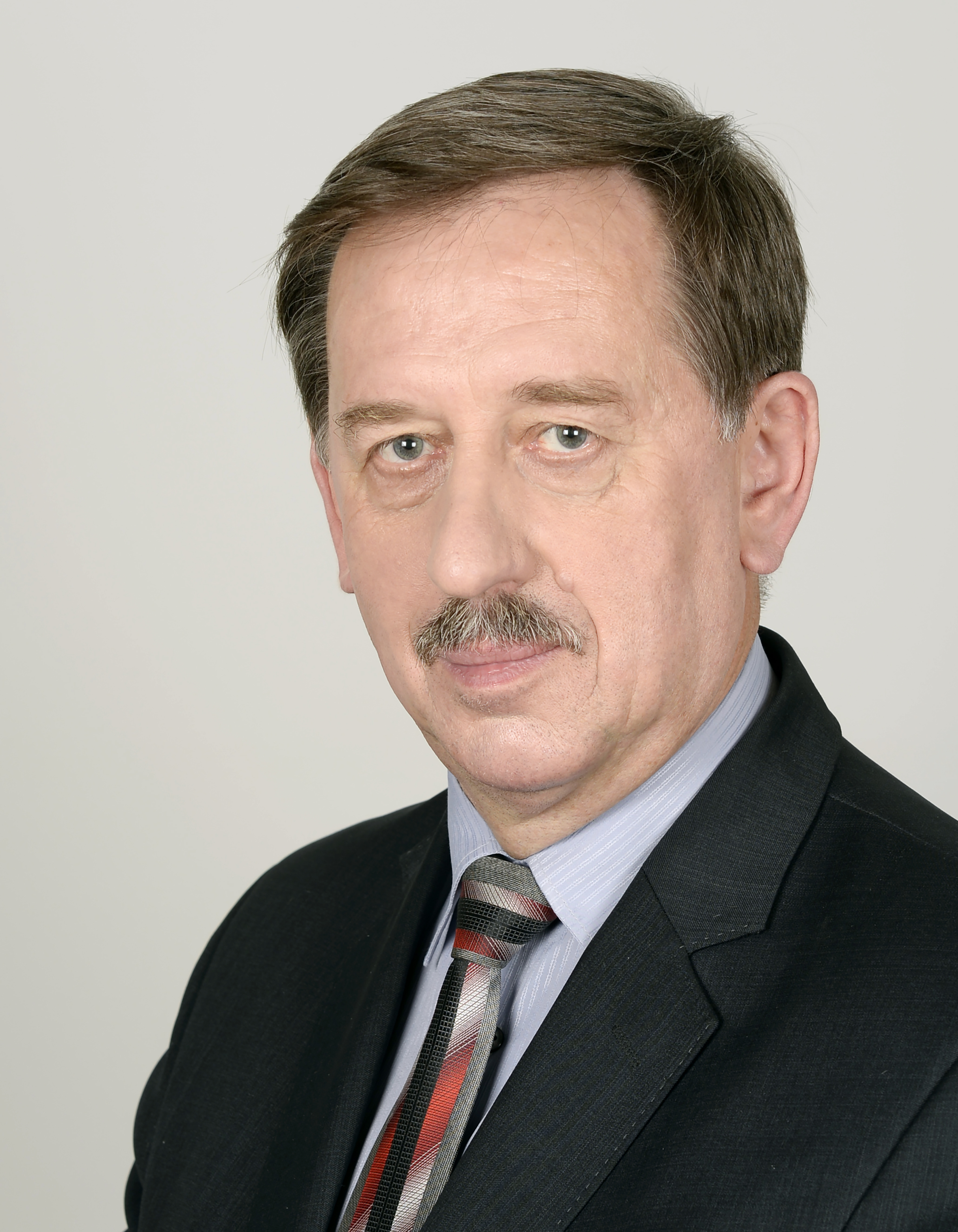
Andrzej Pająk

Andrzej Michał Pająk (born 26 September 1955) is a Polish politician. He was elected to the Senate of Poland (10th term) representing the constituency of Kraków. He was also elected to the 8th term (2011–2015) and 9th term (2015–2019) of the Senate of Poland.
