= Andrzej Kobiak =

Polish politician (born 1951)

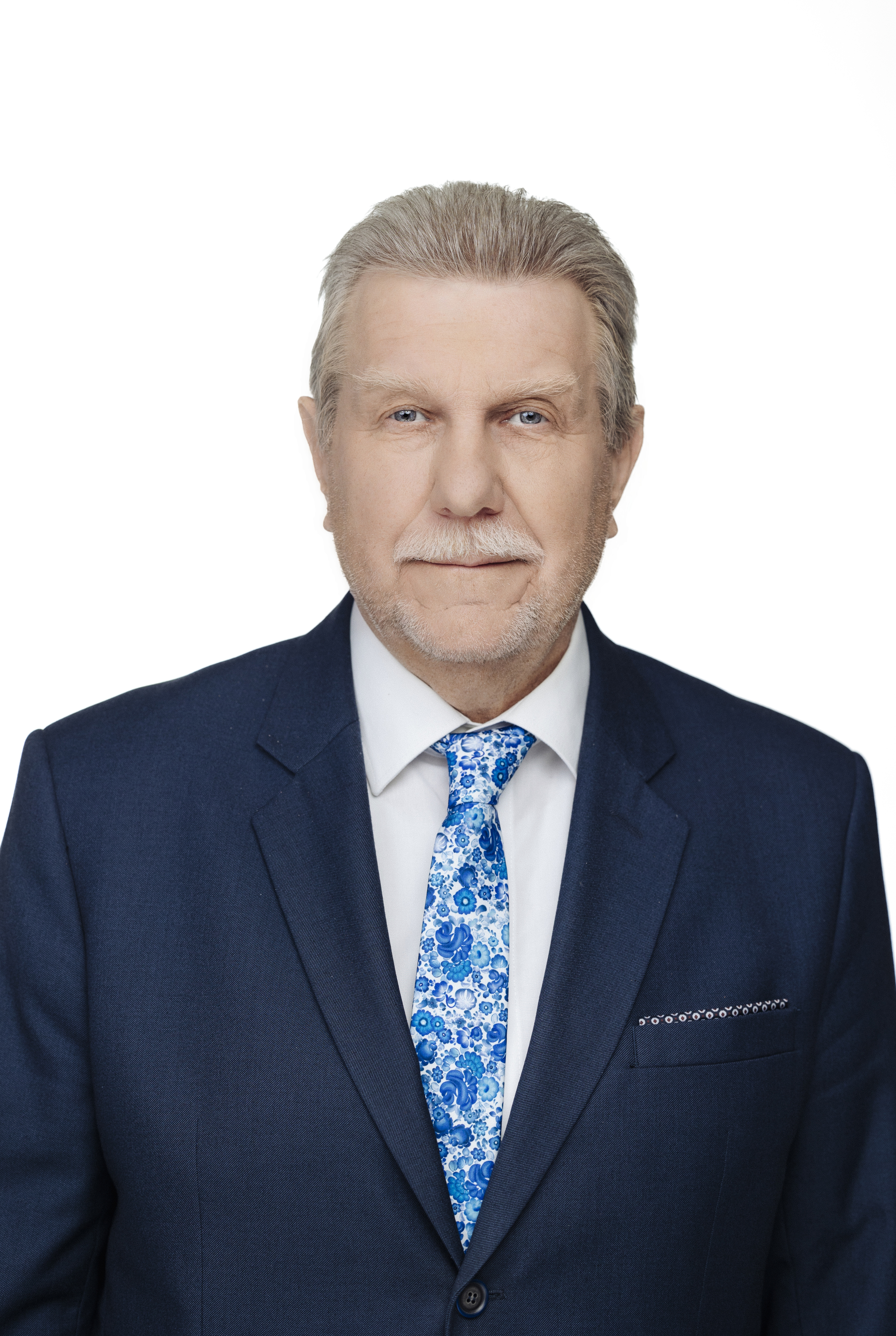

Member of the Senate of Poland

Personal details
- Born: 14 July 1951 (age 74)

Andrzej Kobiak (born 14 July 1951) is a Polish politician. He was elected to the Senate of Poland (10th term) representing the constituency of Bydgoszcz. He was also elected to the 8th term (2011–2015) and 9th term (2015–2019) of the Senate of Poland. He was also elected to the 11th term.
