= 2019 Polish parliamentary election =

- 13 October 2019
- Opinion polls
- Registered: 30,253,556
- Sejm

All 460 seats in the Sejm 231 seats needed for a majority
- Turnout: 18,678,457 (61.74%) ▲10.82 pp
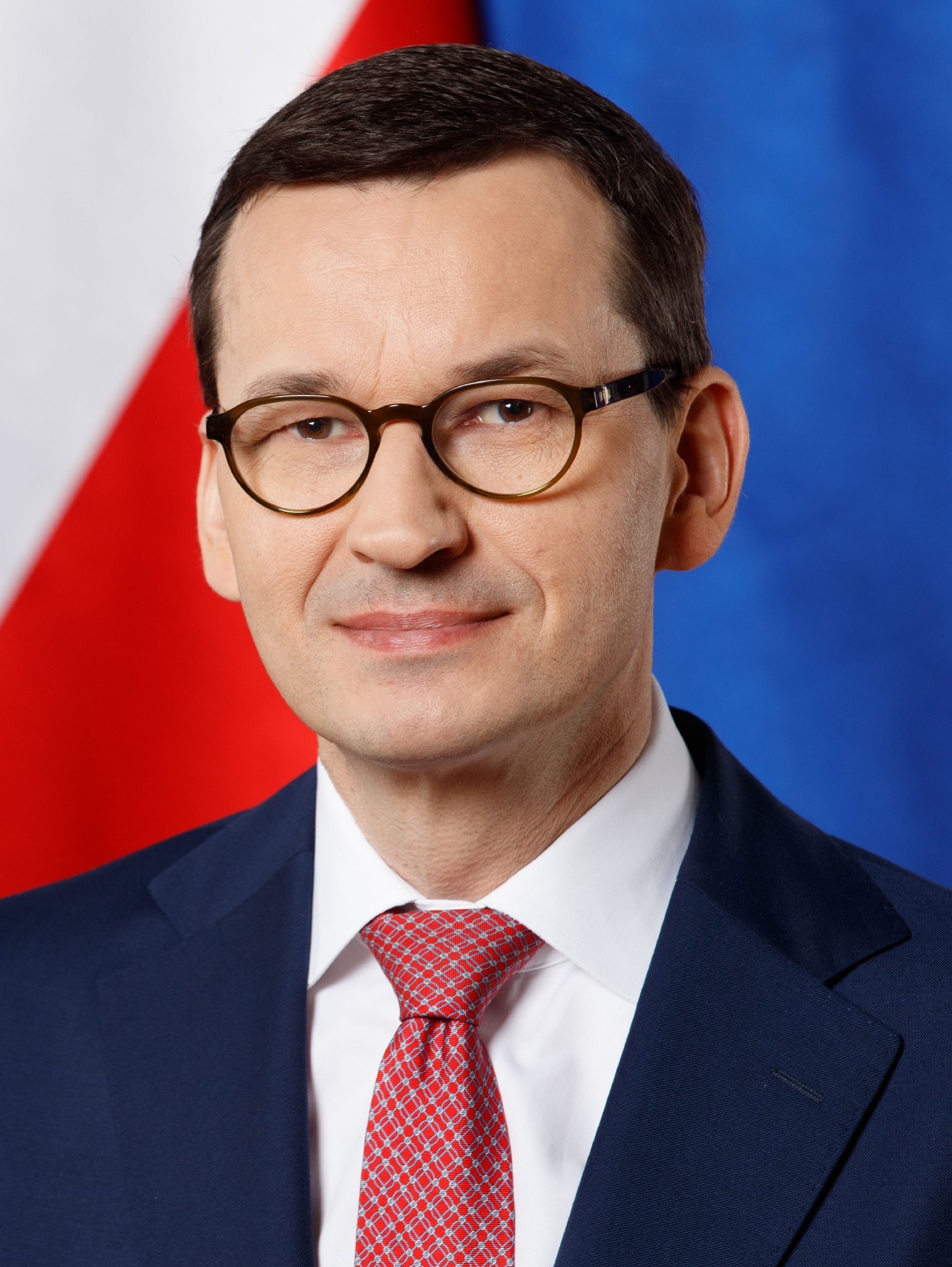

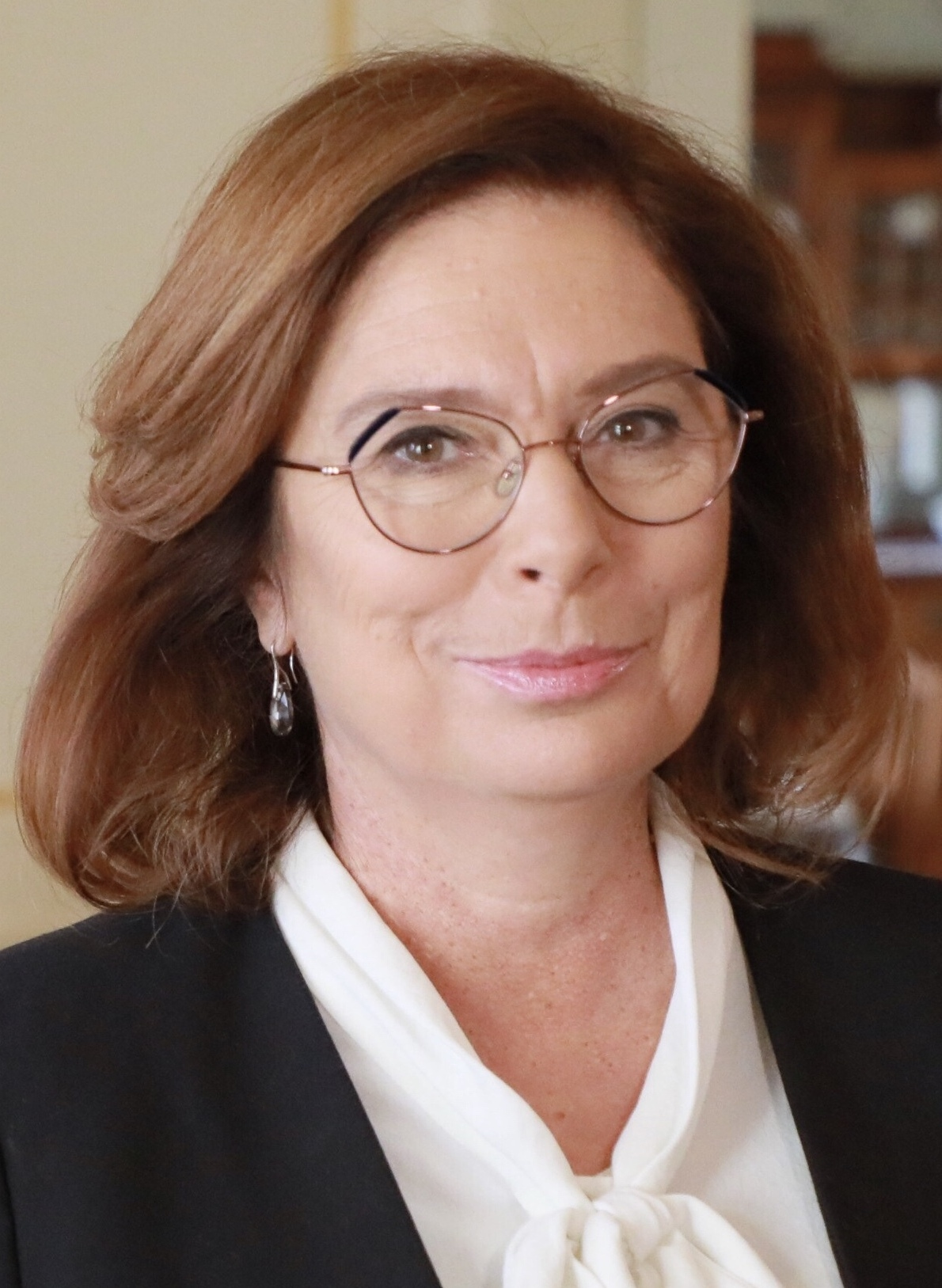

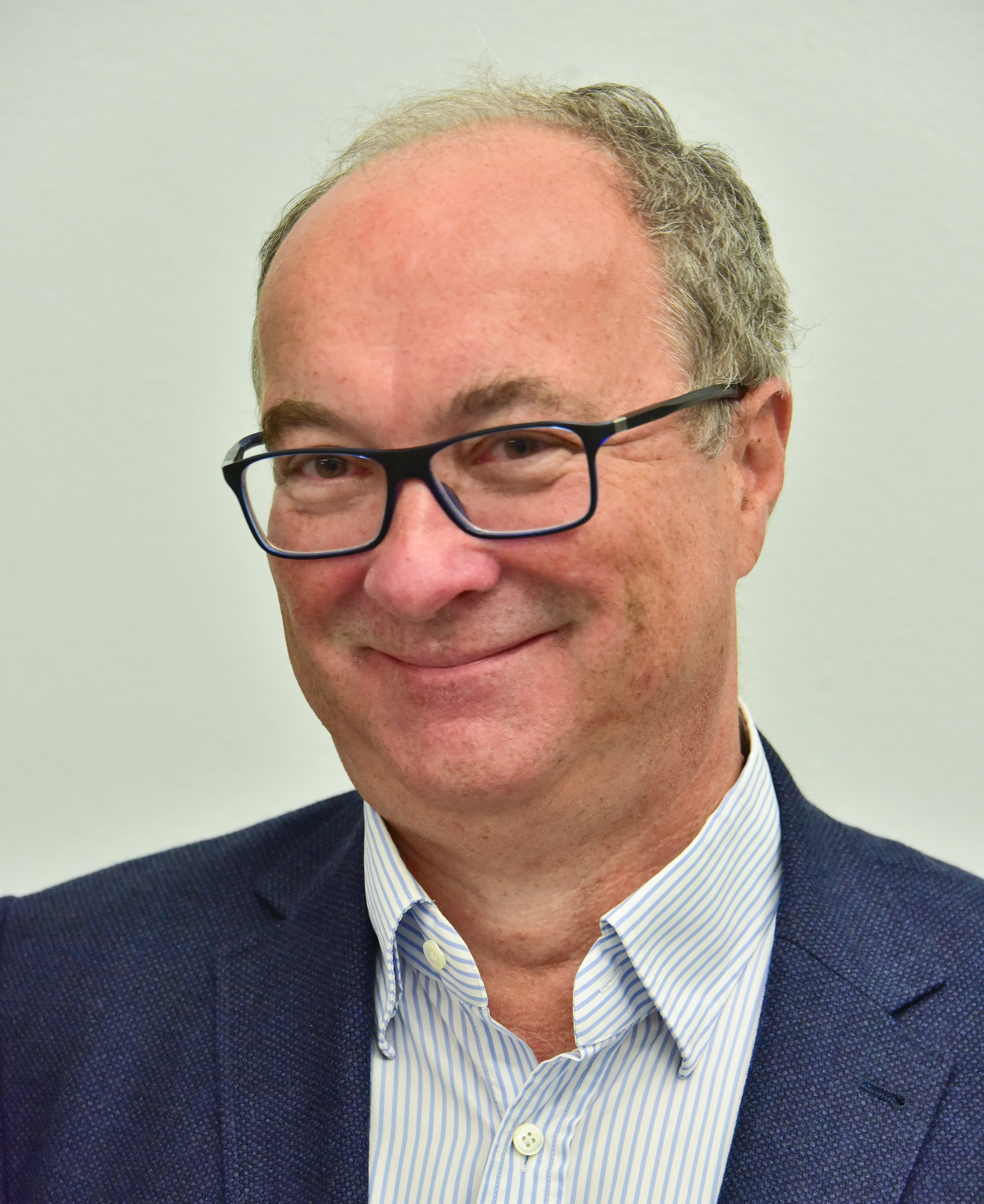

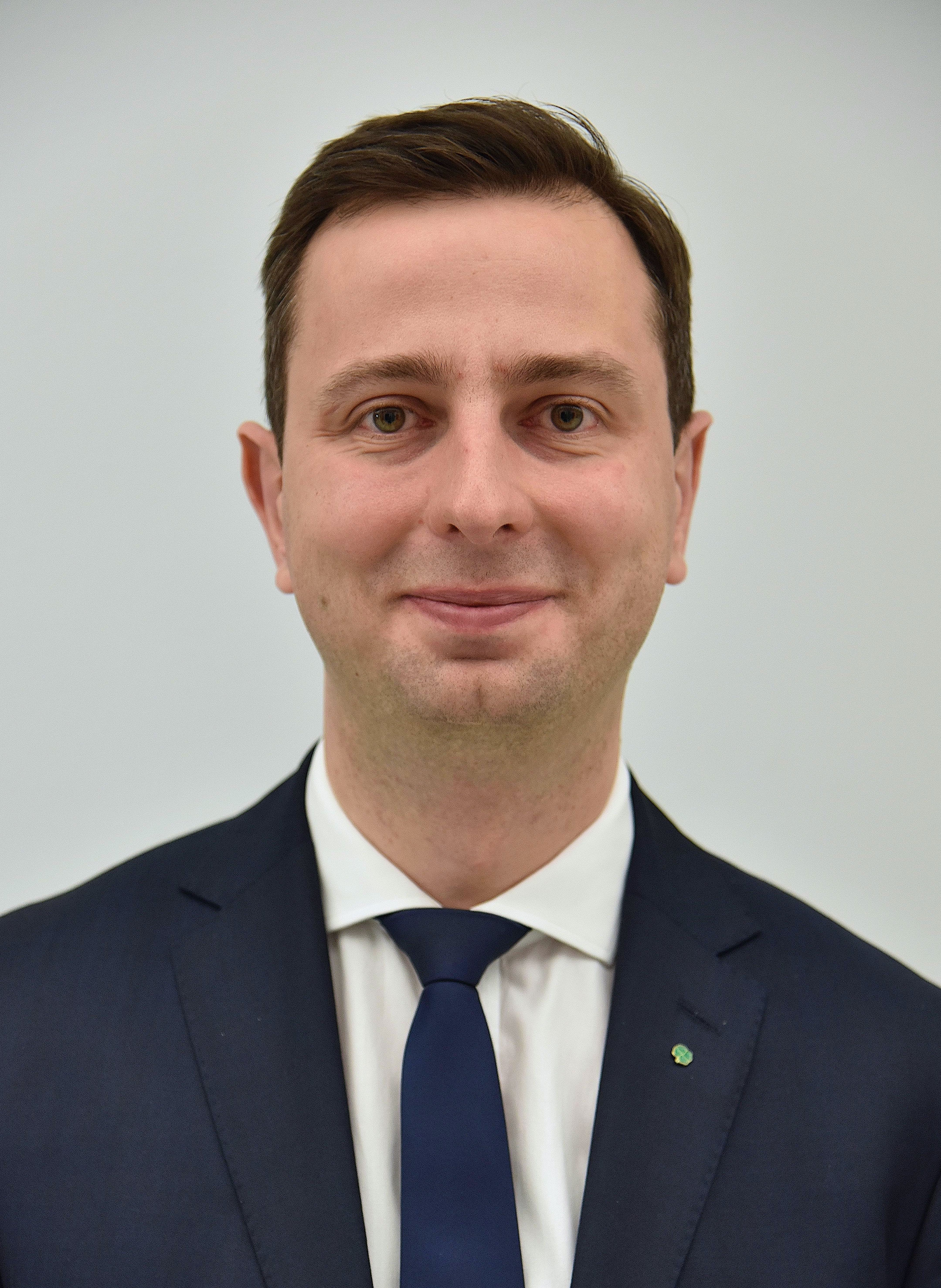

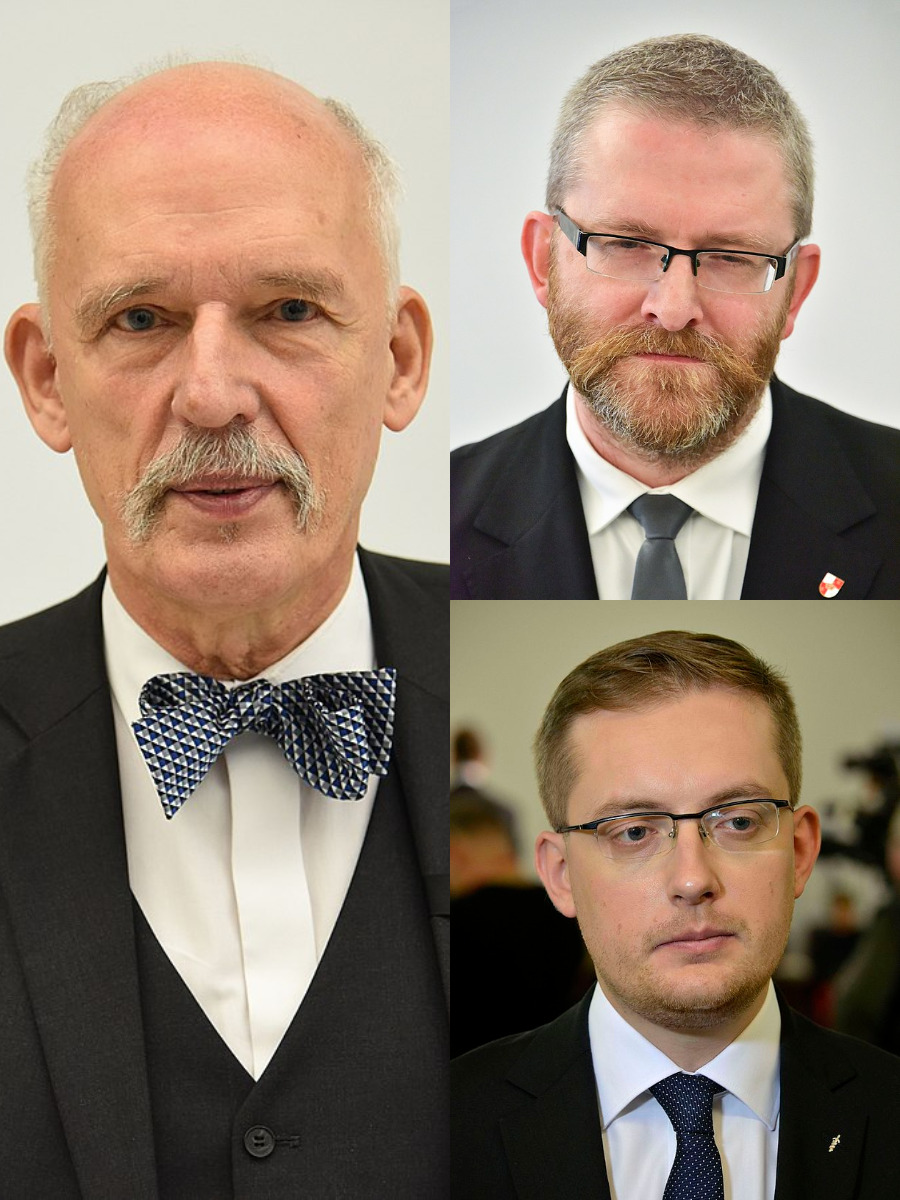

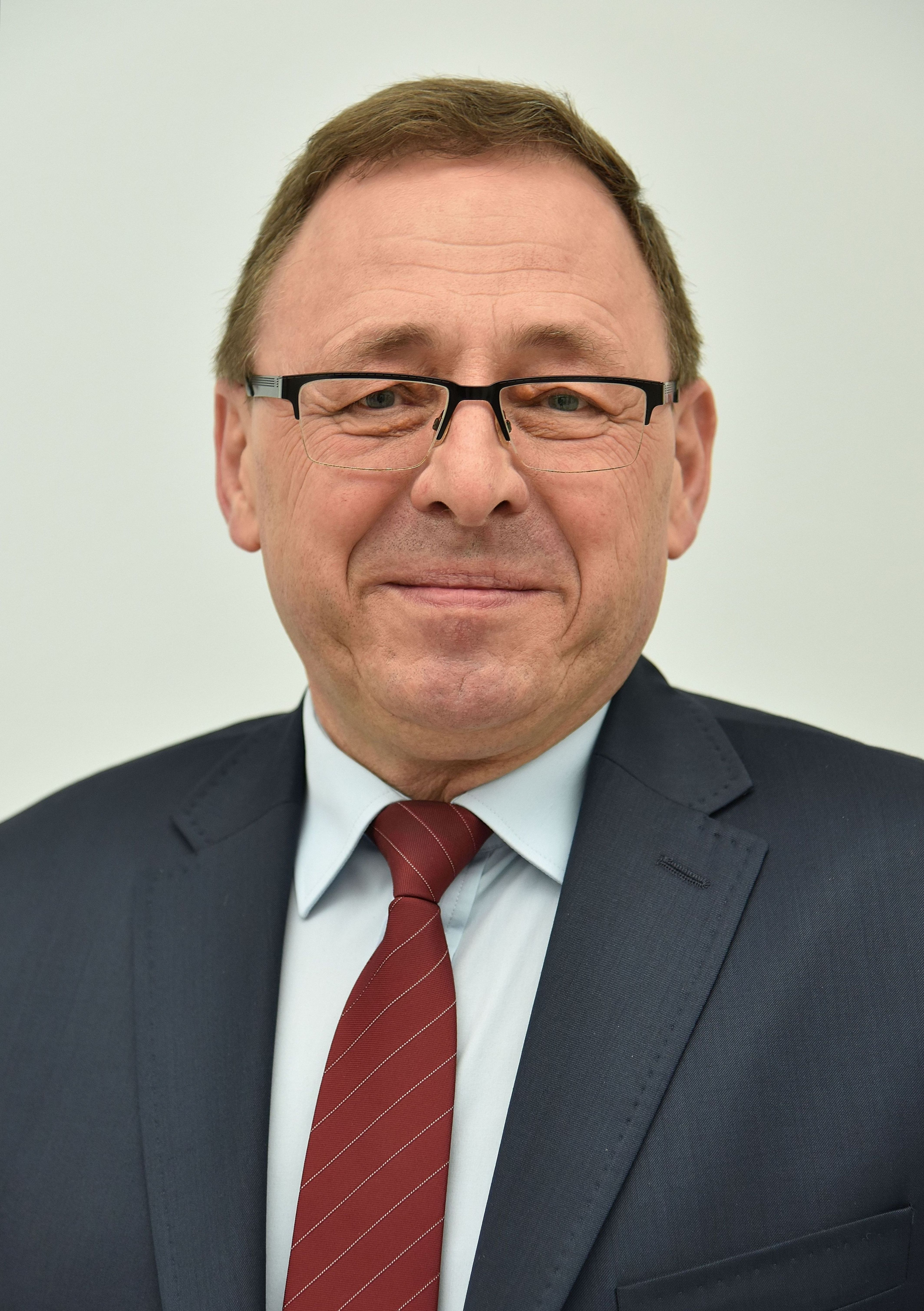
	Majority party	Minority party	Third party
Leader	Mateusz Morawiecki (Note: Jarosław Kaczyński, the leader of the Law and Justice party, named incumbent Prime Minister Mateusz Morawiecki as the prime ministerial candidate)	Małgorzata Kidawa-Błońska (Note: Grzegorz Schetyna, the leader of the Civic Platform party, named Małgorzata Kidawa-Błońska as the prime ministerial candidate)	Włodzimierz Czarzasty
Party	PiS	PO	SLD
Alliance	United Right	Civic Coalition	The Left
Leader since	11 December 2017	3 September 2019	23 January 2016
Last election	37.6%, 235 seats	31.7%, 166 seats (Note: Aggregate results for Civic Platform (24.1%, 138 seats) and Modern (7.6%, 28 seats).)	11.2%, 0 seats (Note: Aggregate results for the United Left (7.6%, 0 seats) and Left Together (3.6%, 0 seats).)
Seats won	235	134	49
Seat change	0	▼32	▲49
Popular vote	8,051,935	5,060,355	2,319,946
Percentage	43.6%	27.4%	12.6%
Swing	▲6.0 pp	▼4.3 pp	▲1.4 pp
	Fourth party	Fifth party	Sixth party
Leader	Władysław Kosiniak-Kamysz	Janusz Korwin-Mikke; Robert Winnicki; Grzegorz Braun	Ryszard Galla
Party	PSL	KORWiN; RN; KKP	MN
Alliance	Polish Coalition	Confederation
Leader since	7 November 2015	22 January 2015 10 December 2014 7 September 2019	20 January 2008
Last election	13.9%, 58 seats (Note: Aggregate results for the PSL (5.1%, 16 seats) and Kukiz'15 (8.8%, 42 seats).)	4.9%, 0 seats (Note: Aggregate results for KORWiN (4.8%, 0 seats) and God Bless You! (0.1%, 0 seats).)	0.2%, 1 seat
Seats won	30	11	1
Seat change	▼28	▲11	Steady
Popular vote	1,578,523	1,256,953	32,094
Percentage	8.6%	6.8%	0.2%
Swing	▼5.4 pp	▲2.0 pp	0.0 pp
- Senate
- All 100 seats in the Senate; 51 seats needed for a majority
- Turnout: 18,677,930 (61.74%) ▲10.83pp
Party	Vote %	Seats	+/–
ZP	44.56	48	−13
KO	35.66	43	+9
KP	5.72	3	+2
Lewica	2.28	2	+2
Independent	5.98	4	0
This lists parties that won seats. See the complete results below.

Government before	Government after election
First Morawiecki cabinet PiS (ZP)	Second Morawiecki cabinet PiS (ZP)

Parliamentary elections were held in Poland on 13 October 2019. All 460 members of the Sejm and 100 senators of the Senate were elected. The ruling right-wing Law and Justice (PiS) won re-election to a second term retaining its majority in the Sejm. However, it lost its majority in the Senate to the opposition. With 43.6% of the popular vote, Law and Justice received the highest vote share by any party since Poland returned to democracy in 1989. The turnout was the highest for a parliamentary election since the first free elections after the fall of communism in 1989, though it was later surpassed by the 2023 parliamentary election. For the first time after 1989, the ruling party controlled one house, while the opposition controlled the other.

== Background ==
Following the 2015 parliamentary elections, the Law and Justice (PiS) party was able to form a majority government, after receiving 235 seats to the 138 won by their main competitor, Civic Platform, the first time in the post-communist era that a party had won an outright majority in parliamentary elections. Beata Szydło became Prime Minister on 16 November 2015 heading a cabinet that also included Solidary Poland and Poland Together, which ran on joint lists with Law & Justice.

On 23 December 2015, the Sejm passed a law, which reorganized the Constitutional Court, introducing a requirement for a two-thirds majority and the mandatory participation of at least 13, instead of 9 of the 15 judges. In addition, in early 2016 the PiS government passed a law which began the process of giving the government full control of state radio and television. In protest, the Committee for the Defence of Democracy, with help from the Modern party and Civic Platform, started demonstrations across the country.

In December 2016, a parliamentary crisis took place, after the Marshal of the Sejm Marek Kuchciński excluded a Civic Platform's MP Michał Szczerba from the Sejm's proceedings. In protest, members of the opposition occupied the Sejm's rostrum. The Marshal, unable to proceed in the main session chamber, moved the session to the smaller Column Hall. Some politicians and commentators supporting Law and Justice accused opposition of attempting a "coup d'état". It ended fruitlessly for the opposition, though the Modern party was disgraced, as its leader, Ryszard Petru, was photographed flying to Madeira, with fellow MP Joanna Schmidt, during the tense situation. Modern's opinion poll ratings fell as a result.

In December 2017, Mateusz Morawiecki succeeded Beata Szydło as Prime Minister.

On 6 December 2018, the Pro-Polish Coalition was formed - an alliance of KORWiN and the National Movement, with more parties joining later in order to contest the 2019 Elections to the European Parliament. The alliance later changed its name to just "Confederation".

In February 2019 the Wiosna party was founded as a left wing anticlerical party. For the 2019 European Parliament elections, the opposition formed a wide coalition, the European Coalition, with the exception of Wiosna. However, PiS won the European elections. Following the loss, the European Coalition dissolved and the Confederation lost many member parties and leaders. In June 2019 Modern and the Civic Platform formed a joint parliamentary club. August 6, the Left was formed, a de facto coalition of Razem, SLD and Wiosna, de jure carrying the SLD name. On August 8, 2019 PSL allied with Kukiz'15 in an alliance named "Polish Coalition".

== Electoral system ==
The 460 members of the Sejm are elected by open party-list proportional representation in 41 multi-member districts. Each district has between 7 and 20 seats.

Seats are allocated using the D'Hondt method, with a 5% threshold for single parties and 8% threshold for coalitions (thresholds are waived for national minorities).

The Senate is elected using first-past-the-post voting in single-member districts. Candidates for Deputies are nominated either by the electoral committees of the various political parties and or by individual voter committees.

Overall, the Sejm includes 460 MPs. Should a party have 231 or more deputies in Parliament, it has an absolute majority and could govern by itself, without a coalition partner.

The constitution can be amended with a supermajority of two-thirds, or 307 deputies.

== Election date ==
The date of the election, 13 October, was set by the President of Poland, Andrzej Duda.

The Constitution of Poland requires that the next election should take place on a non-working day, Sunday or national holiday, within the 30-day period before the expiry of the 4-year period beginning from the commencement of the current Sejm's and Senate's term of office. Elections can be held earlier under certain conditions, for instance, if the Sejm is dissolved or if no government is formed in time limit set by the constitution.

Since the former Sejm and Senate first sitting took place on 12 November 2015, possible dates were Sundays 13 October, 20 October, 27 October, 3 November and 10 November 2019. The other possible but unlikely dates were public holidays 1 November (All Saints' Day) and 11 November (Independence Day) 2019.

== Lists ==
=== Electoral committees registered in all constituencies ===
List		Ideology	European Union position	Leader	Standing pre-campaign		# of candidates	
List		Ideology	European Union position	Leader	Sejm	Senate	Sejm	Senate
1	Polish Coalition (Note: While a formal political alliance, participants stand for election on the Polish People's Party political party electoral committee lists. Other participants of the political alliance include Kukiz'15, Union of European Democrats, Alliance of Democrats and other associations) • Polish People's Party • Kukiz'15 • Union of European Democrats • Alliance of Democrats • Silesians Together • Poland Needs Us • One-PL	Christian democracy, decentralization	Pro-Europeanism	Władysław Kosiniak-Kamysz	38 / 460	1 / 100	919	16
2	Law and Justice (Note: Informally as the United Right with participants standing for election on the Law and Justice political party electoral committee lists. Other participants of the political alliance include Agreement, United Poland, Republican Party, "Piast" Party, and Free and Solidary) • Agreement • United Poland • Republican Party • "Piast" Party • Free and Solidary	National conservatism, Christian democracy	Soft Euroscepticism	Jarosław Kaczyński; Mateusz Morawiecki (Note: Candidate for Prime Minister of Poland)	240 / 460	61 / 100	919	99
3	The Left (Note: While a formal political alliance, participants stand for election on the Democratic Left Alliance political party electoral committee lists. Other participants of the political alliance include Spring, Together and Polish Socialist Party.) • Democratic Left Alliance • Spring • Together • Your Movement • Polish Socialist Party	Social democracy, progressivism	Pro-Europeanism	Włodzimierz Czarzasty	0 / 460	0 / 100	911	7
4	Confederation (Note: Officially registered as a political party, but is, in fact, a political alliance between KORWiN, National Movement, Confederation of Polish Crown, Union of Christian Families.) • KORWiN • National Movement • Confederation of the Polish Crown • Union of Christian Families • Party of Drivers • National League	Right-libertarianism, Polish nationalism	Hard Euroscepticism	Janusz Korwin-Mikke; Robert Winnicki; Grzegorz Braun	4 / 460	0 / 100	881	7
5	Civic Coalition (Note: An official coalition electoral committee composed of Civic Platform, Modern, Polish Initiative, and the Greens with candidates from other parties (e.g. Silesian Autonomy Movement), independents, local government activists, and political associations. The threshold of 8% of the votes, therefore, applies.) • Civic Platform • Modern • The Greens • Polish Initiative • Silesian Autonomy Movement • Social Democracy of Poland	Liberalism, big tent	Pro-Europeanism	Grzegorz Schetyna; Małgorzata Kidawa-Błońska	155 / 460	26 / 100	920	73

=== Electoral committees registered in less than half of the constituencies ===
List		Ideology	European Union position	Leader	Standing pre-campaign		Number of constituencies	# of candidates	
List		Ideology	European Union position	Leader	Sejm	Senate	Number of constituencies	Sejm	Senate
6	Right Wing of the Republic	Social conservatism, political Catholicism	Soft Euroscepticism	Bogusław Kiernicki	1 / 460	0 / 100	1	18	1
7	Action of Disappointed Retirees and Pensioners	Pensioners' rights, solidarism	Soft Euroscepticism	Wojciech Kornowski	0 / 460	0 / 100	3	53	0
8	Coalition of Nonpartisan and Local Government Activists	Decentralization, pro-single-member districts	Pro-Europeanism	Robert Raczyński	0 / 460	0 / 100	19	405	14
9	Skuteczni	Classical liberalism, direct democracy	Soft Euroscepticism	Piotr Liroy-Marzec	1 / 460	0 / 100	5	75	0
10	German Minority	German minority interests, regionalism	Pro-Europeanism	Ryszard Galla	1 / 460	0 / 100	1	24	2

=== Electoral committees with candidates only for the Senate ===
Name	Ideology	European Union position	Leader	Candidates	
Name	Ideology	European Union position	Leader	Sejm	Senate
Restore the Law	Pro-single-member districts, populism	Soft Euroscepticism	Janusz Sanocki	Skuteczni list	7
Polish Left	Social democracy, third way	Pro-Europeanism	Jacek Zdrojewski		3
List of Mirosław Piotrowski to the Senate	National Catholicism, Christian right	Soft Euroscepticism	Mirosław Piotrowski		3
Self-Defence	Agrarian socialism, left-wing nationalism	Hard Euroscepticism	Lech Kuropatwiński		2
Unity of the Nation	National conservatism, national Catholicism	Soft Euroscepticism	Gabriel Janowski		2
Silesians Together	Localism, Silesian autonomism	Pro-Europeanism	Leon Swaczyna	Polish Coalition list	2
List of Kukiz'15 to the Senate	Pro-single-member districts, direct democracy	Pro-Europeanism	Paweł Kukiz	Polish Coalition list	2
Other electoral committees with only one candidate				Various	38

== Campaign slogans ==
List	Slogan in Polish	Unofficial English translation
Polish Coalition	Łączymy Polaków	We connect Poles
Law and Justice	Dobry czas dla Polski	A good time for Poland
The Left	Łączy nas przyszłość Wybierz przyszłość	The future unites us Choose the future
Confederation	Polska dla Ciebie	Poland for you
Civic Coalition	Jutro może być lepsze; Współpraca, a nie kłótnie	Tomorrow can be better; Cooperation, not quarrels
Coalition of Nonpartisans and Local Government Activists	Ty też jesteś bezpartyjny!	You are also nonpartisan!
Effective	Odpowiedzialna Polska	Responsible Poland
German Minority	Opolskie! Ma znaczenie	Opole! It matters

== Opinion polls ==
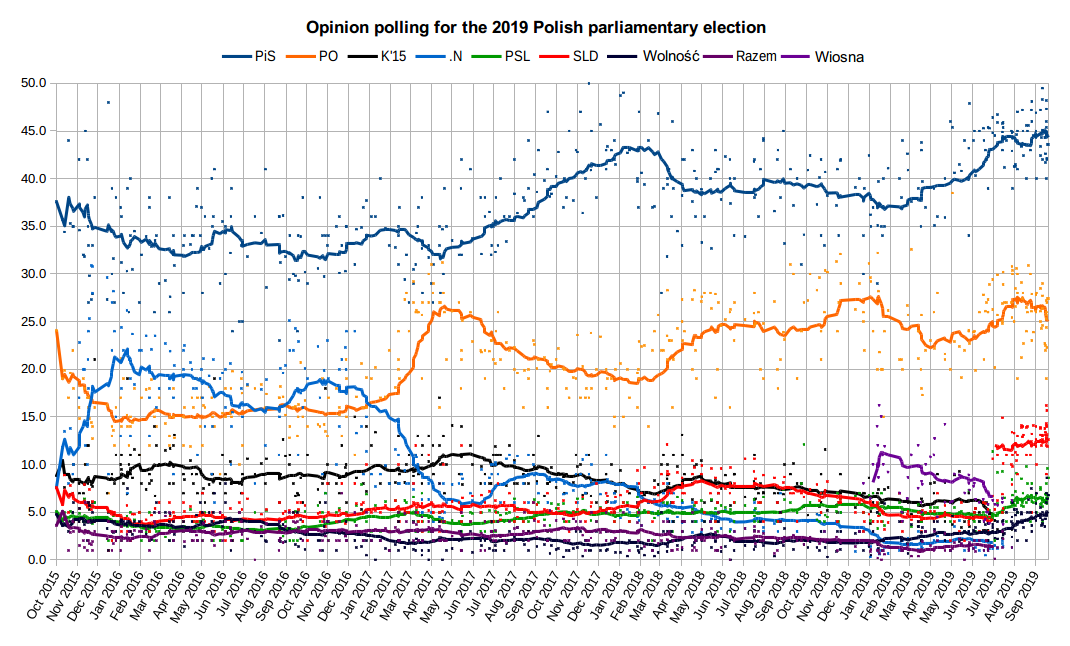

== Results ==
=== Sejm ===
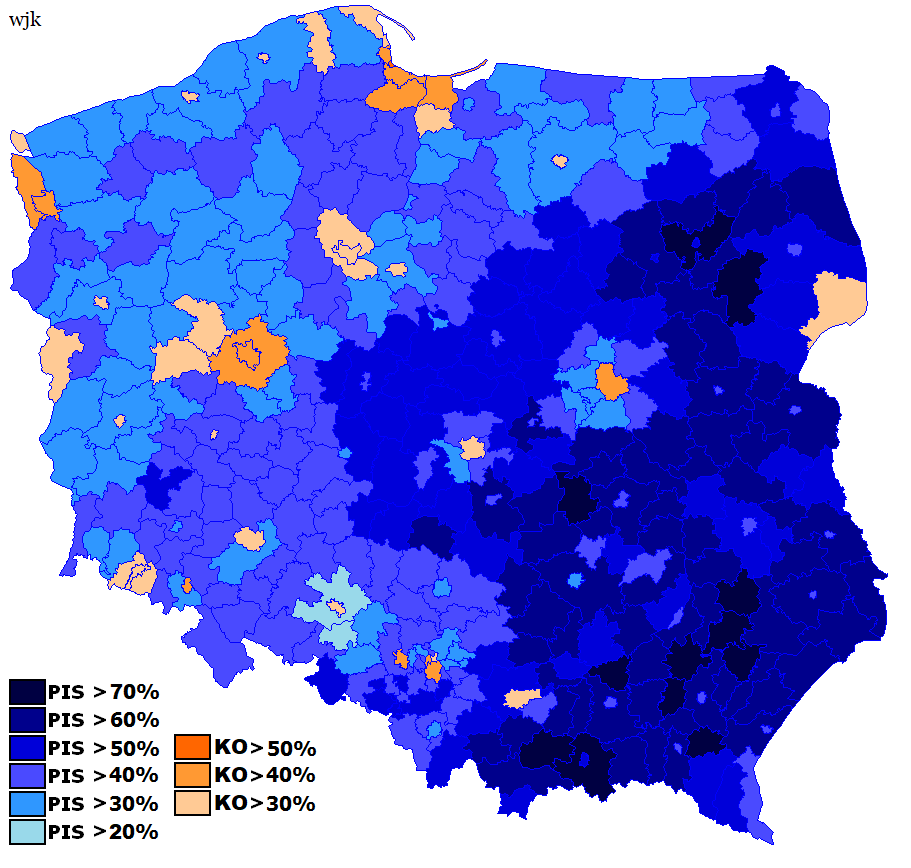
Results of the Sejm election by powiats.

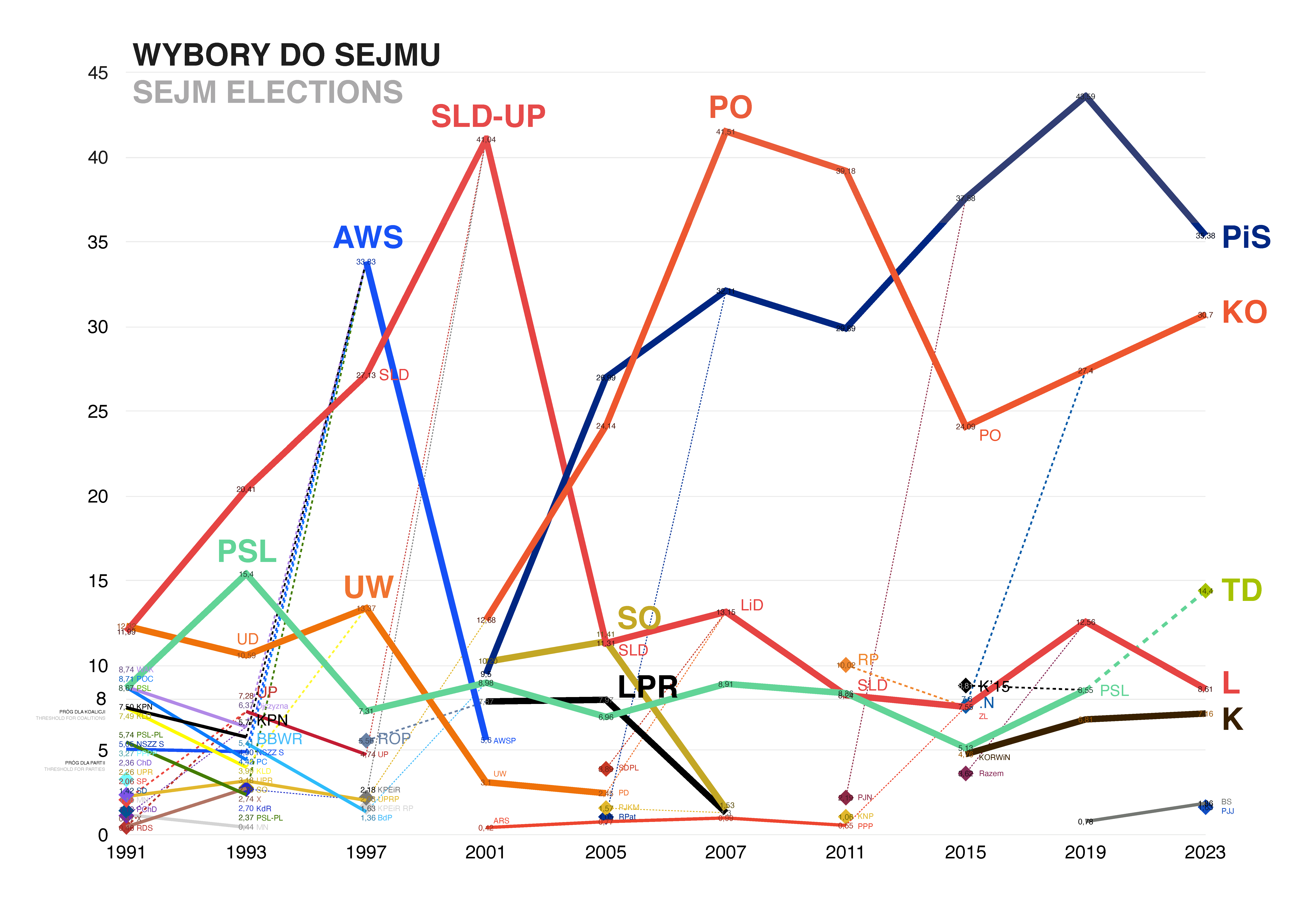
Results of Sejm elections 1991–2023

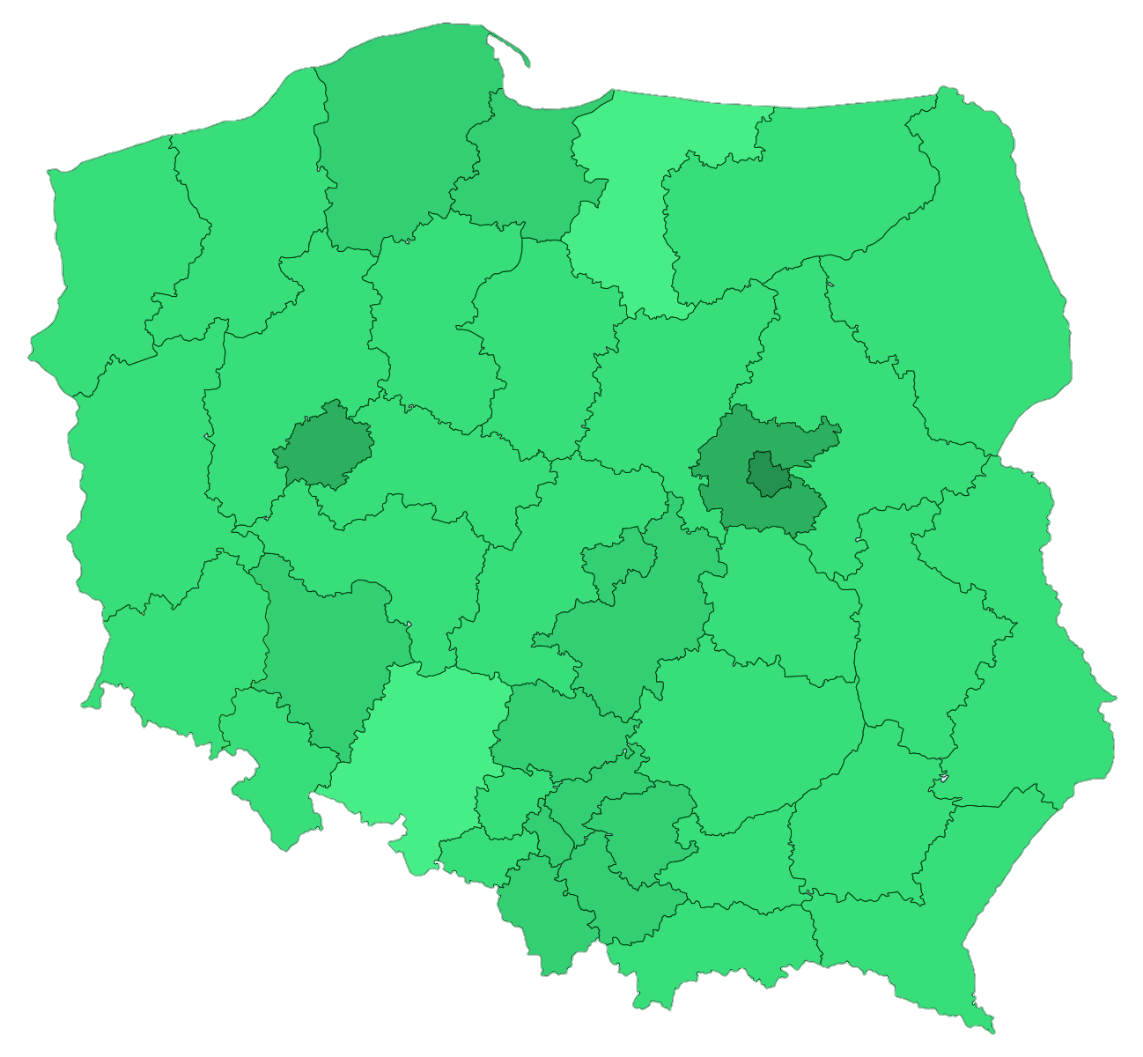
Turnout by constituency

Party	Votes	%	Seats	+/–
Law and Justice	8,051,935	43.59	235	0
Civic Coalition	5,060,355	27.40	134	−32
The Left	2,319,946	12.56	49	+49
Polish Coalition	1,578,523	8.55	30	−28
Confederation Liberty and Independence	1,256,953	6.81	11	+8
Nonpartisan Local Government Activists	144,773	0.78	0	New
German Minority	32,094	0.17	1	0
Effective	18,918	0.10	0	New
Action of Disappointed Retirees and Pensioners	5,448	0.03	0	New
Right Wing of the Republic	1,765	0.01	0	−1
Total	18,470,710	100.00	460	0
Valid votes	18,470,710	98.89		
Invalid/blank votes	207,747	1.11		
Total votes	18,678,457	100.00		
Registered voters/turnout	30,253,556	61.74		
Source: National Electoral Commission, National Electoral Commission

==== Party breakdown ====
Party or alliance		Votes	%	Seats	+/–
United Right	Law and Justice	6,516,252	35.28	187	−6
United Right	Solidary Poland	331,467	1.79	10	+1
United Right	Agreement	291,506	1.58	16	+10
United Right	Republican Party	9,972	0.05	1	New
United Right	Independents and others	902,738	4.89	21	–5
United Right	Total	8,051,935	43.59	235	0
Civic Coalition	Civic Platform	3,589,053	19.43	102	−24
Civic Coalition	.Modern	315,209	1.71	8	+3
Civic Coalition	Polish Initiative	113,278	0.61	2	New
Civic Coalition	The Greens	96,720	0.52	3	+3
Civic Coalition	Independents and others	946,095	5.12	19	−16
Civic Coalition	Total	5,060,355	27.40	134	−32
The Left	Democratic Left Alliance	873,450	4.73	23	+23
The Left	Left Together	509,318	2.76	6	+6
The Left	Spring	483,113	2.62	15	New
The Left	Independents and others	454,065	2.46	5	+5
The Left	Total	2,319,946	12.56	49	+49
Polish Coalition	Polish People's Party	972,339	5.26	19	+3
Polish Coalition	Union of European Democrats	29,832	0.16	1	New
Polish Coalition	Independents and others (Note: Six elected independents were part of Kukiz'15 which was not a registered party at the time of the election and therefore its members ran without party affiliation)	576,352	3.12	10	−27
Polish Coalition	Total	1,578,523	8.55	30	−28
Confederation	KORWiN	448,946	2.43	5	+5
Confederation	National Movement	356,902	1.93	5	+2
Confederation	Confederation of the Polish Crown	31,148	0.17	1	New
Confederation	Independents and others	419,957	2.27	0	0
Confederation	Total	1,256,953	6.81	11	+8
Nonpartisan Local Government Activists		144,773	0.78	0	New
German Minority		32,094	0.17	1	0
Effective		18,918	0.10	0	New
Action of Disappointed Retirees and Pensioners		5,448	0.03	0	New
Right Wing of the Republic		1,765	0.01	0	−1
Total		18,470,710	100.00	460	–
Source: National Electoral Commission, National Electoral Commission

==== By constituency ====
Constituency	Turnout	PiS		KO		SLD		PSL		KWiN		MN		Others	Lead
Constituency	Turnout	%	Seats	%	Seats	%	Seats	%	Seats	%	Seats	%	Seats	Others	Lead
1 – Legnica	57.80	42.40	6	25.02	3	16.43	2	7.17	1	5.85	0	-	-	0.00	17.38
2 – Wałbrzych	55.83	40.54	4	32.09	3	12.35	1	7.25	0	5.42	0	-	-	2.34	8.45
3 – Wrocław	65.89	34.67	5	32.80	5	15.41	2	7.45	1	6.46	1	-	-	3.21	1.87
4 – Bydgoszcz	59.90	36.43	5	31.05	4	15.17	2	9.02	1	7.05	0	-	-	1.29	5.38
5 – Toruń	56.37	40.38	6	26.42	4	14.83	2	10.88	1	6.33	0	-	-	1.16	13.96
6 – Lublin	60.88	55.39	9	19.30	3	7.81	1	9.10	1	7.07	1	-	-	1.32	36.09
7 – Chełm	54.40	59.50	8	14.80	2	6.83	1	11.86	1	5.84	0	-	-	1.16	44.70
8 – Zielona Góra	57.20	34.30	4	31.27	4	15.61	2	11.63	1	7.19	1	-	-	0.00	3.03
9 – Łódź	68.32	32.90	4	35.82	4	20.10	2	4.53	0	6.65	0	-	-	0.00	2.92
10 – Piotrków Trybunalski	61.81	56.21	6	15.64	1	10.95	1	10.44	1	6.76	0	-	-	0.00	40.57
11 – Sieradz	60.92	49.81	7	20.48	3	11.98	1	10.29	1	5.88	0	-	-	1.56	29.33
12 – Kraków I	62.86	53.48	6	23.04	2	8.51	0	7.90	0	7.06	0	-	-	0.00	30.44
13 – Kraków II	68.57	39.56	6	30.48	4	13.01	2	7.27	1	7.99	1	-	-	1.69	9.08
14 – Nowy Sącz	60.28	65.80	8	13.83	1	6.07	0	7.35	1	6.95	0	-	-	0.00	51.97
15 – Tarnów	60.47	59.59	7	14.00	1	5.94	0	13.35	1	7.11	0	-	-	0.00	45.59
16 – Płock	57.68	52.45	6	16.85	2	8.76	1	15.17	1	5.24	0	-	-	1.53	35.60
17 – Radom	60.84	57.82	6	17.15	2	7.43	0	10.20	1	5.89	0	-	-	1.51	40.67
18 – Siedlce	60.98	59.76	9	13.94	2	6.45	0	11.94	1	6.49	0	-	-	1.42	45.82
19 – Warsaw I	79.75	27.49	6	42.05	9	18.19	3	4.75	1	7.51	1	-	-	0.00	14.56
20 – Warsaw II	70.56	40.89	6	28.61	4	13.09	1	8.60	1	6.63	0	-	-	2.19	12.28
21 – Opole	52.91	37.64	5	26.71	4	11.74	1	10.31	1	5.70	0	7.90	1	0.00	10.93
22 – Krosno	56.37	63.36	8	15.94	2	6.04	0	7.85	1	6.81	0	-	-	0.00	47.42
23 – Rzeszów	60.13	62.38	10	14.39	2	6.59	1	7.79	1	8.25	1	-	-	0.60	47.99
24 – Białystok	56.97	52.04	8	21.04	3	9.09	1	9.33	1	6.96	1	-	-	1.55	31.00
25 – Gdańsk	64.21	32.10	4	41.31	6	13.47	1	5.90	0	7.21	1	-	-	0.00	9.21
26 – Słupsk	62.79	36.43	5	35.85	5	12.47	2	7.94	1	7.30	1	-	-	0.00	0.58
27 – Bielsko-Biała I	64.91	46.76	5	27.20	3	11.48	1	7.13	0	7.42	0	-	-	0.00	19.56
28 – Częstochowa	61.22	44.28	4	22.63	2	15.59	1	8.68	0	6.07	0	-	-	2.75	21.65
29 – Katowice I	59.18	37.75	4	32.61	4	13.38	1	5.99	0	7.67	0	-	-	2.61	5.14
30 – Bielsko-Biała II	60.41	48.28	5	27.71	3	9.68	1	5.64	0	7.17	0	-	-	1.54	20.57
31 – Katowice II	64.00	39.19	5	37.20	5	11.92	1	4.37	0	7.33	1	-	-	0.00	1.99
32 – Katowice III	62.99	37.13	4	29.66	3	21.90	2	4.85	0	6.45	0	-	-	0.00	7.47
33 – Kielce	57.70	55.18	10	16.65	3	9.95	1	9.88	1	5.95	1	-	-	2.40	38.53
34 – Elbląg	52.71	40.86	4	28.43	2	11.64	1	10.89	1	5.66	0	-	-	2.52	12.43
35 – Olsztyn	54.32	38.82	5	26.46	3	13.84	1	13.19	1	6.97	0	-	-	0.71	12.36
36 – Kalisz	59.67	42.48	6	24.72	3	13.43	2	12.80	1	6.57	0	-	-	0.00	17.76
37 – Konin	59.08	47.29	5	20.48	2	15.04	1	9.81	1	6.74	0	-	-	0.64	26.81
38 – Piła	59.11	35.64	4	30.60	3	13.28	1	13.86	1	6.62	0	-	-	0.00	5.04
39 – Poznań	73.13	25.33	3	45.38	5	16.49	2	6.20	0	6.61	0	-	-	0.00	20.05
40 – Koszalin	55.46	36.83	3	32.31	3	15.44	1	9.43	1	5.98	0	-	-	0.00	4.52
41 – Szczecin	59.36	35.11	4	35.71	5	15.25	2	7.40	1	6.53	0	-	-	0.00	0.60
Poland	61.74	43.59	235	27.40	134	12.56	49	8.55	30	6.81	11	0.17	1	0.92	16.19
Source: National Electoral Commission

=== Senate ===
Results of the Senate election by single-mandate districts. Law and Justice (PiS) Civic Coalition (KO) Polish People's Party (PSL) The Left (Lewica) Independent

Cartogram showing the popular vote in each electoral district.

Party or alliance		Votes	%	Seats	+/–
United Right	Law and Justice	5,799,409	31.86	38	−1
United Right	Agreement	356,123	1.96	2	−1
United Right	Solidary Poland	271,915	1.49	2	0
United Right	Independents	1,682,746	9.25	6	−10
United Right	Total	8,110,193	44.56	48	−13
Civic Coalition	Civic Platform	4,481,803	24.62	34	+7
Civic Coalition	Independents and others	2,008,503	11.03	9	+3
Civic Coalition	Total	6,490,306	35.66	43	+9
Polish Coalition	Polish People's Party	865,413	4.75	2	+2
Polish Coalition	Union of European Democrats	176,496	0.97	1	New
Polish Coalition	Total	1,041,909	5.72	3	+2
The Left	Democratic Left Alliance	302,312	1.66	0	0
The Left	Spring	64,172	0.35	1	New
The Left	Polish Socialist Party	49,261	0.27	1	+1
The Left	Total	415,745	2.28	2	+2
Nonpartisan Local Government Activists		331,385	1.82	0	New
Confederation		144,124	0.79	0	0
Polish Left		94,988	0.52	0	New
Restore the Law		92,006	0.51	0	New
Movement "Citizens RP"		85,720	0.47	0	0
Silesians Together		50,071	0.28	0	New
German Minority Electoral Committee		49,138	0.27	0	0
Kukiz'15 to the Senate		46,210	0.25	0	0
Mirosław Piotrowski to the Senate		33,967	0.19	0	New
Together Podhale Spisz Orawa		26,273	0.14	0	0
Right Wing of the Republic		21,943	0.12	0	New
Unity of the Nation		18,327	0.10	0	New
National Rebirth of Poland		13,859	0.08	0	0
Normal Country		13,687	0.08	0	New
Self-Defence		13,510	0.07	0	0
Labour Party		11,532	0.06	0	New
Slavic Union		8,469	0.05	0	0
Independents and single-candidate committees		1,087,986	5.98	4	0
Total		18,201,348	100.00	100	0
Valid votes		18,201,348	97.45		
Invalid/blank votes		476,582	2.55		
Total votes		18,677,930	100.00		
Registered voters/turnout		30,253,556	61.74		
Source: National Electoral Commission, National Electoral Commission

==== By constituency ====
#	Voivodeship	Commission	#	Result	Elected Member
1	Lower Silesian	Legnica	I	Law and Justice hold	Rafał Ślusarz
2	Lower Silesian	Legnica	II	Law and Justice hold	Krzysztof Mróz
3	Lower Silesian	Legnica	III	Law and Justice hold	Dorota Czudowska
4	Lower Silesian	Wałbrzych	I	Civic Coalition hold	Agnieszka Kołacz-Leszczyńska
5	Lower Silesian	Wałbrzych	II	Law and Justice hold	Aleksander Szwed
6	Lower Silesian	Wrocław	I	Civic Coalition hold	Bogdan Zdrojewski
7	Lower Silesian	Wrocław	II	Civic Coalition hold	Alicja Chybicka
8	Lower Silesian	Wrocław	III	Civic Coalition gain from Independent	Barbara Zdrojewska
9	Kuyavian-Pomeranian	Bydgoszcz	I	Civic Coalition hold	Andrzej Kobiak
10	Kuyavian-Pomeranian	Bydgoszcz	II	Civic Coalition hold	Krzysztof Brejza
11	Kuyavian-Pomeranian	Toruń	I	Civic Coalition hold	Antoni Mężydło
12	Kuyavian-Pomeranian	Toruń	II	Polish Coalition gain from Law and Justice	Ryszard Bober
13	Kuyavian-Pomeranian	Toruń	III	Law and Justice hold	Józef Łyczak
14	Lublin	Lublin	I	Law and Justice hold	Stanisław Gogacz
15	Lublin	Lublin	II	Law and Justice hold	Grzegorz Czelej
16	Lublin	Lublin	III	Civic Coalition gain from Law and Justice	Jacek Bury
17	Lublin	Chełm	I	Law and Justice gain from Independent	Grzegorz Bierecki
18	Lublin	Chełm	II	Law and Justice gain from Polish Coalition	Józef Zając
19	Lublin	Chełm	III	Law and Justice hold	Jerzy Chróścikowski
20	Lubusz	Zielona Góra	I	Civic Coalition hold	Robert Dowhan
21	Lubusz	Zielona Góra	II	Civic Coalition hold	Władysław Komarnicki
22	Lubusz	Zielona Góra	III	Independent gain from Civic Coalition	Wadim Tyszkiewicz
23	Łódź	Łódź	I	Civic Coalition hold	Artur Dunin
24	Łódź	Łódź	II	Independent gain from Civic Coalition	Krzysztof Kwiatkowski
25	Łódź	Sieradz	I	Law and Justice hold	Przemysław Błaszczyk
26	Łódź	Sieradz	II	Law and Justice hold	Maciej Łuczak
27	Łódź	Sieradz	III	Law and Justice hold	Michał Seweryński
28	Łódź	Piotrków Trybunalski	I	Law and Justice hold	Wiesław Dobkowski
29	Łódź	Piotrków Trybunalski	II	Law and Justice hold	Rafał Ambrozik
30	Lesser Poland	Kraków	I	Law and Justice hold	Andrzej Pająk
31	Lesser Poland	Kraków	II	Law and Justice hold	Marek Pęk
32	Lesser Poland	Kraków	III	Civic Coalition hold	Jerzy Fedorowicz
33	Lesser Poland	Kraków	IV	Civic Coalition hold	Bogdan Klich
34	Lesser Poland	Tarnów	I	Law and Justice hold	Włodzimierz Bernacki
35	Lesser Poland	Tarnów	II	Law and Justice hold	Kazimierz Wiatr
36	Lesser Poland	Nowy Sącz	I	Law and Justice hold	Jan Hamerski
37	Lesser Poland	Nowy Sącz	II	Law and Justice hold	Wiktor Durlak
38	Masovian	Płock	I	Law and Justice hold	Marek Martynowski
39	Masovian	Płock	II	Law and Justice hold	Jan Maria Jackowski
40	Masovian	Warszawa	I	Civic Coalition gain from Law and Justice	Jolanta Hibner
41	Masovian	Warszawa	II	Polish Coalition gain from Law and Justice	Michał Kamiński
42	Masovian	Warszawa	III	Civic Coalition gain from Independent	Marek Borowski
43	Masovian	Warszawa	IV	Civic Coalition hold	Barbara Borys-Damięcka
44	Masovian	Warszawa	V	Civic Coalition hold	Kazimierz Ujazdowski
45	Masovian	Warszawa	VI	Civic Coalition hold	Aleksander Pociej
46	Masovian	Siedlce	I	Law and Justice hold	Robert Mamątow
47	Masovian	Siedlce	II	Law and Justice hold	Maria Koc
48	Masovian	Siedlce	III	Law and Justice hold	Waldemar Kraska
49	Masovian	Radom	I	Law and Justice hold	Stanisław Karczewski
50	Masovian	Radom	II	Law and Justice hold	Wojciech Skurkiewicz
51	Opole	Opole	I	Law and Justice hold	Jerzy Czerwiński
52	Opole	Opole	II	Civic Coalition hold	Danuta Jazłowiecka
53	Opole	Opole	III	Civic Coalition gain from Law and Justice	Beniamin Godyla
54	Subcarpathian	Rzeszów	I	Law and Justice hold	Janina Sagatowska
55	Subcarpathian	Rzeszów	II	Law and Justice hold	Zdzisław Pupa
56	Subcarpathian	Rzeszów	III	Law and Justice hold	Stanisław Ożóg
57	Subcarpathian	Krosno	I	Law and Justice hold	Alicja Zając
58	Subcarpathian	Krosno	II	Law and Justice hold	Mieczysław Golba
59	Podlaskie	Białystok	I	Law and Justice hold	Marek Komorowski
60	Podlaskie	Białystok	II	Law and Justice hold	Mariusz Gromko
61	Podlaskie	Białystok	III	Law and Justice hold	Jacek Bogucki
62	Pomeranian	Słupsk	I	Civic Coalition hold	Kazimierz Kleina
63	Pomeranian	Słupsk	II	Civic Coalition gain from Law and Justice	Stanisław Lamczyk
64	Pomeranian	Słupsk	III	Civic Coalition hold	Sławomir Rybicki
65	Pomeranian	Gdańsk	I	Civic Coalition hold	Bogdan Borusewicz
66	Pomeranian	Gdańsk	II	Civic Coalition gain from Law and Justice	Ryszard Świlski
67	Pomeranian	Gdańsk	III	Civic Coalition hold	Leszek Czarnobaj
68	Silesian	Częstochowa	I	Law and Justice hold	Ryszard Majer
69	Silesian	Częstochowa	II	The Left gain from Law and Justice	Wojciech Konieczny
70	Silesian	Katowice	I	Civic Coalition gain from Law and Justice	Zygmunt Frankiewicz
71	Silesian	Katowice	II	Civic Coalition hold	Halina Bieda
72	Silesian	Bielsko-Biała	I	Law and Justice hold	Ewa Gawęda
73	Silesian	Bielsko-Biała	II	Law and Justice hold	Wojciech Piecha
74	Silesian	Katowice	III	Law and Justice gain from Civic Coalition	Dorota Tobiszowska
75	Silesian	Katowice	IV	The Left gain from Law and Justice	Gabriela Morawska-Stanecka
76	Silesian	Katowice	V	Civic Coalition gain from Law and Justice	Beata Małecka-Libera
77	Silesian	Katowice	VI	Civic Coalition gain from Law and Justice	Joanna Sekuła
78	Silesian	Bielsko-Biała	III	Civic Coalition gain from Law and Justice	Agnieszka Gorgoń-Komor
79	Silesian	Bielsko-Biała	IV	Law and Justice hold	Tadeusz Kopeć
80	Silesian	Katowice	VII	Civic Coalition hold	Marek Plura
81	Świętokrzyskie	Kielce	I	Law and Justice hold	Grzegorz Bierecki
82	Świętokrzyskie	Kielce	II	Law and Justice hold	Jarosław Rusiecki
83	Świętokrzyskie	Kielce	III	Law and Justice hold	Krzysztof Słoń
84	Warmian-Masurian	Elbląg	I	Civic Coalition hold	Jerzy Wcisła
85	Warmian-Masurian	Elbląg	II	Law and Justice hold	Bogusława Orzechowska
86	Warmian-Masurian	Olsztyn	I	Independent hold	Lidia Staroń
87	Warmian-Masurian	Olsztyn	II	Law and Justice hold	Małgorzata Kopiczko
88	Greater Poland	Piła	I	Civic Coalition hold	Adam Szejnfeld
89	Greater Poland	Piła	II	Polish Coalition gain from Civic Coalition	Jan Filip Libicki
90	Greater Poland	Poznań	I	Civic Coalition hold	Jadwiga Rotnicka
91	Greater Poland	Poznań	II	Civic Coalition hold	Marcin Bosacki
92	Greater Poland	Konin	I	Civic Coalition gain from Law and Justice	Paweł Arndt
93	Greater Poland	Konin	II	Law and Justice hold	Margareta Budner
94	Greater Poland	Kalisz	I	Civic Coalition hold	Wojciech Ziemniak
95	Greater Poland	Kalisz	II	Civic Coalition gain from Law and Justice	Ewa Matecka
96	Greater Poland	Kalisz	III	Civic Coalition gain from Law and Justice	Janusz Pęcherz
97	West Pomeranian	Szczecin	I	Civic Coalition hold	Tomasz Grodzki
98	West Pomeranian	Szczecin	II	Civic Coalition hold	Magdalena Kochan
99	West Pomeranian	Koszalin	I	Civic Coalition hold	Janusz Gromek
100	West Pomeranian	Koszalin	II	Independent gain from Civic Coalition	Stanisław Gawłowski

== Electorate demographics ==
Sociology of the electorate
Demographic	Turnout	Law and Justice	Civic Coalition	The Left	Polish Coalition	Confederation	Others
Total vote	61.1%	43.6%	27.4%	12.6%	8.6%	6.8%	1.1%
Sex
Men	60.8%	44.2%	24.7%	11.6%	9.5%	8.9%	1.1%
Women	61.5%	43.1%	29.9%	13.1%	8.7%	4.1%	1.1%
Age
18–29 years old	46.4%	26.3%	24.3%	18.4%	9.7%	19.7%	1.6%
30–39 years old	60.3%	36.9%	29.9%	12.9%	10.5%	8.2%	1.6%
40–49 years old	75.7%	41.0%	31.8%	12.1%	9.9%	4.1%	1.1%
50–59 years old	59.6%	51.2%	26.3%	9.5%	9.4%	2.8%	0.8%
60 or older	66.2%	55.8%	25.2%	10.4%	6.9%	1.1%	0.6%
Occupation
Company owner		29.8%	38.8%	12.4%	9.4%	8.6%	1.0%
Manager/expert		26.8%	39.6%	15.9%	8.6%	8.0%	1.1%
Admin/services		38.8%	30.0%	13.7%	9.7%	6.4%	1.4%
Farmer		67.7%	7.9%	3.7%	16.5%	3.4%	0.8%
Student		22.4%	25.1%	24.3%	9.1%	17.5%	1.6%
Unemployed		56.1%	16.8%	7.8%	11.0%	6.8%	1.5%
Retired		56.9%	24.4%	10.7%	6.4%	1.1%	0.5%
Others		42.1%	26.1%	12.5%	9.8%	8.0%	1.5%
Agglomeration
Rural		56.4%	16.9%	7.8%	11.6%	6.0%	1.3%
<50,000 pop.		41.7%	28.2%	12.7%	9.9%	6.4%	1.1%
51,000 - 200,000 pop.		38.5%	32.2%	14.2%	7.1%	6.9%	1.1%
201,000 - 500,000 pop.		32.6%	39.1%	14.9%	5.3%	7.5%	0.6%
>500,000 pop.		27.1%	40.7%	19.9%	5.6%	6.1%	0.6%
Education
Elementary		63.3%	12.0%	8.1%	9.3%	6.5%	0.8%
Vocational		64.0%	15.8%	5.9%	9.6%	3.7%	1.0%
Secondary		45.6%	25.5%	12.2%	8.9%	6.8%	1.0%
Higher		30.1%	36.6%	15.9%	9.0%	7.1%	1.3%
Second-round president vote in 2015
Andrzej Duda		79.9%	4.8%	3.0%	6.1%	5.5%	0.7%
Bronisław Komorowski		2.7%	60.9%	22.0%	10.9%	2.7%	0.8%
Didn't vote		20.1%	27.0%	22.2%	11.8%	16.8%	2.1%
Don't remember		28.3%	26.9%	15.1%	14.8%	12.0%	2.9%
Sejm vote in 2015
Law and Justice		90.4%	2.2%	1.2%	3.6%	2.3%	0.3%
Civic Platform		3.7%	68.8%	16.1%	8.5%	2.2%	0.7%
Kukiz'15		22.2%	16.1%	12.2%	21.9%	23.9%	3.7%
Modern		4.4%	53.7%	27.5%	8.7%	4.3%	1.4%
United Left		2.5%	18.0%	71.4%	6.0%	1.5%	0.6%
Polish People's Party		8.9%	9.0%	10.0%	68.4%	2.7%	1.0%
KORWiN		8.3%	10.1%	6.5%	6.8%	65.8%	2.5%
Together		5.7%	22.8%	55.5%	10.3%	4.9%	0.8%
Others		16.6%	26.9%	13.9%	13.1%	12.4%	17.1%
Didn't vote		23.3%	27.2%	22.1%	10.6%	14.9%	1.9%
Don't remember		34.2%	24.0%	14.8%	15.0%	9.3%	2.7%
Source: Ipsos
