= Polish Parliament Youth Council =

- Established: 8 November 2024
- Mission: politics, social activity, youth policy
- Chair: Miłosz Kozikowski
- Members: 306
- Address: Senate of the Republic of Poland, Wiejska 6/8, Warsaw
- Location: Warsaw, Poland

The Polish Parliament Youth Council is an official advisory body of the Polish Parliamentary Group for Youth Affairs, established in 2024 to address the underrepresentation of young people in the legislative process.

The Council has over 300 members from across Poland, making it the largest youth advisory body in Polish history.

== History ==
On 10 May 2024, the Polish Parliamentary Group for Youth Affairs appointed the leadership of its Youth Council and tasked it with developing the framework for a parliamentary youth advisory body, organising recruitment, drafting the Council’s rules of procedure, and establishing its organisational structure.

The Council officially began its work on 8 November 2024, during an inaugural session at the Senate of the Republic of Poland. Participants included Marshal of the Senate Małgorzata Kidawa-Błońska, Senators Jerzy Wcisła and Krzysztof Kwiatkowski, former Commissioner for Children’s Rights Marek Michalak, and Deputy Commissioner for Children’s Rights Adam Chmura. With 304 members, the Council became the largest youth advisory body in Polish history.

On 18 October 2024, the Council organised a conference on children’s rights, during which it called on Prime Minister Donald Tusk to ratify the Third Optional Protocol to the Convention on the Rights of the Child.

On 22 October 2024, the Council organised an event on additional educational programmes for schools funded through Poland’s National Recovery Plan, bringing together representatives of the Ministry of Education, local authorities, and NGOs.

The Council held its second plenary session on 22 April 2025 at the Silesian Stadium in Chorzów. The session brought together regional government representatives and members of parliament, including Joanna Bojczuk, Member of the Board of the Silesian Voivodeship; Senators Joanna Sekuła, Halina Bieda, and Jerzy Wcisła; and Members of the Sejm Urszula Koszutska and Aleksandra Kot. The discussion focused on encouraging greater civic engagement among young people in Poland.

On 15 May 2025, at a press conference in the Senate of the Republic of Poland, the Council concluded its six-month “YouthVote” voter mobilisation campaign, which aimed to encourage young people to participate in the upcoming presidential election.

Together with the Commissioner for Children’s Rights, the Council contributed to drafting legislation aimed at lowering the age at which young people can independently access psychological support from 18 to 13. After being passed by the Sejm and the Senate in June and July 2025, the bill was submitted to President Andrzej Duda for signature. The President instead referred it to the Constitutional Tribunal, citing concerns relating to parental authority.

On 21 November 2025, the Council co-organised a conference on necessary reforms to the Polish government’s housing policy. Young people presented their proposals to representatives of the Ministry of Economic Development and Technology, Ministry of Development Funds and Regional Policy, and Ministry of Agriculture and Rural Development.

On 27 November 2025, the Council submitted to parliamentarians a comprehensive position paper on proposed changes to Poland’s 2026 state budget.

On 26 March 2026, Commissioner for Children’s Rights Monika Horna-Cieślak, together with representatives of the Council and other youth organisations, presented at the Sejm a jointly developed proposal to amend the Social Assistance Act. The proposed amendment would exempt minors from the obligation to cover the costs of an adult’s stay in a social assistance home.

The Council held its fourth plenary session at the Senate of the Republic of Poland on 10 April 2026. Participants included Deputy Marshal of the Senate Rafał Grupiński; Senators Jerzy Wcisła, Jolanta Piotrowska, Agnieszka Gorgoń-Komor, and Krzysztof Kwiatkowski, as well as other parliamentarians; Commissioner for Children’s Rights Monika Horna-Cieślak; Deputy Minister of Education Paulina Piechna-Więckiewicz; and representatives of the Youth Council under the Ministry of Foreign Affairs of Ukraine and the Chancellery of the President of the Republic of Poland.

The Council’s fifth plenary session took place on 25 June 2026 in the Column Hall of the Sejm of the Republic of Poland. Participants included Deputy Marshal of the Senate Magdalena Biejat, Deputy Minister of National Education Paulina Piechna-Więckiewicz, and representatives of the Ministry of Economic Development and Technology, National Labour Inspectorate, Ministry of National Education, and National Centre for Nuclear Research.

On 9 July 2026, the Polish Parliamentary Group for Youth Affairs met in the Senate to review the Council’s activities and discuss proposals for its future work. The Council’s coordinators presented a summary of its work during the 2025/2026 term, highlighting more than 70 advisory documents adopted during that period, including proposed amendments, draft legislation, and legislative opinions. They also reported on the launch of international initiatives through the Youth Lublin Triangle coalition, cooperation with the UK Youth Parliament and the European Commission, and dozens of new partnerships with NGOs and public institutions.

At the request of the Council’s President, the Parliamentary Group decided to rename the advisory body the “Polish Parliament Youth Council”.

== Objectives ==
The Council focuses primarily on legislative advice and civic engagement. Its main objective is to address the underrepresentation of young people in the legislative process.

Through policy positions and proposals, reports, proposed amendments, and draft legislation, the Council seeks to ensure that young people’s views are represented in the law-making process, working with parliamentarians from across the political spectrum.

The Council also works closely with other youth representative and advisory bodies in Poland, NGOs, and public institutions.

== Structure ==
The Polish Parliament Youth Council consists of 17 thematic committees, which draft advisory documents regarding legislation, as well as of standing committees within departments, which support the work of the committees. Among others, the Council also contains an international department, where teams responsible for different regions build relations with youth advisory bodies from all over the world.

Councillors working within thematic committees create advisory documents - including amendments to bills, legislative opinions or bills - and consult them with relevant standing committees.

The work of thematic and standing committees is overseen by coordinators of the Council, appointed by the Polish Parliamentary Group for Youth Affairs. Their responsibilities also include organising recruitment for the Council, managing the departments (each is responsible for a different area, e.g. communications, advocacy, law) and acting as intermediaries between the Councillors and the Parliamentary Group for Youth Affairs. All the aforementioned points are fastened together by the Chief Coordinator, who is responsible for the Council’s day-to-day operations.

The Council’s decision-making body for strategic matters and the coherence of the organisation’s operation is the Coordination Committee, composed of representatives of the committees, as well as the Council’s coordinators and the Chief Coordinator, who leads the Coordination Committee’s work.

== Successes and achievements ==
- The Polish Parliament Youth Council represents Poland in the Youth Lublin Triangle - the youth-oriented version of the Lublin Triangle.
- The Polish Parliament Youth Council has led to the submission of numerous bills, including a bill lowering the age for independent access to psychological help, a bill reforming the Fund for Combating Communication Exclusion, and a bill excluding minors from the responsibility for financial obligations of persons residing in social welfare homes.
- The Polish Parliament Youth Council coordinated the #WylęgarniaDOBRA campaign - a coalition of 47 youth organizations and over 170 youth councilors in response to media coverage targeting young people engaged in the work of youth councils nationwide.
- In the 2025/2026 work year, the Council prepared over 70 advisory documents - draft bills, amendments, legislative opinions, analyses, and more.

== Partnerships ==
- Office of the Ombudsman for Children of Poland
- Youth Council under the Ministry of Foreign Affairs of Ukraine
- Polish National Centre for Nuclear Research
- State Labour Inspection of Poland
- The European Parliament Representation in Poland
- The European Commission Representation in Poland
