= Wojciech Ziemniak =

Polish politician (born 1956)

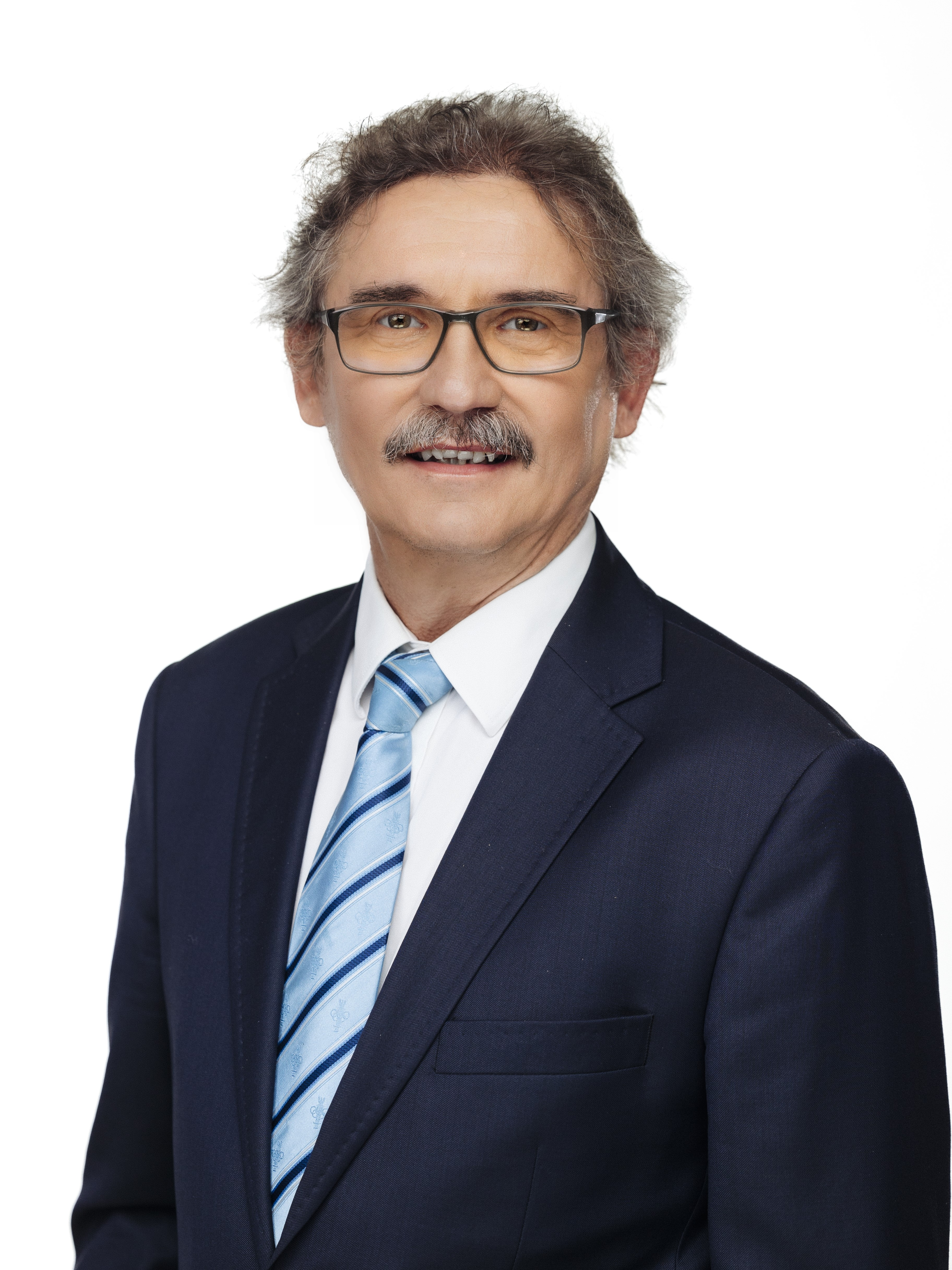

Member of Sejm
- In office 25 September 2005 – ?

Personal details
- Born: 1956 (age 69–70)
- Party: Civic Platform

Wojciech Stanisław Ziemniak (born 25 March 1956 in Czempiń) is a Polish politician. He was elected to the Sejm on 25 September 2005, getting 13,193 votes in 36 Kalisz district as a candidate from the Civic Platform list.

== See also ==
- List of Sejm members (2005–2007)
