= Marcin Bosacki =

Polish politician

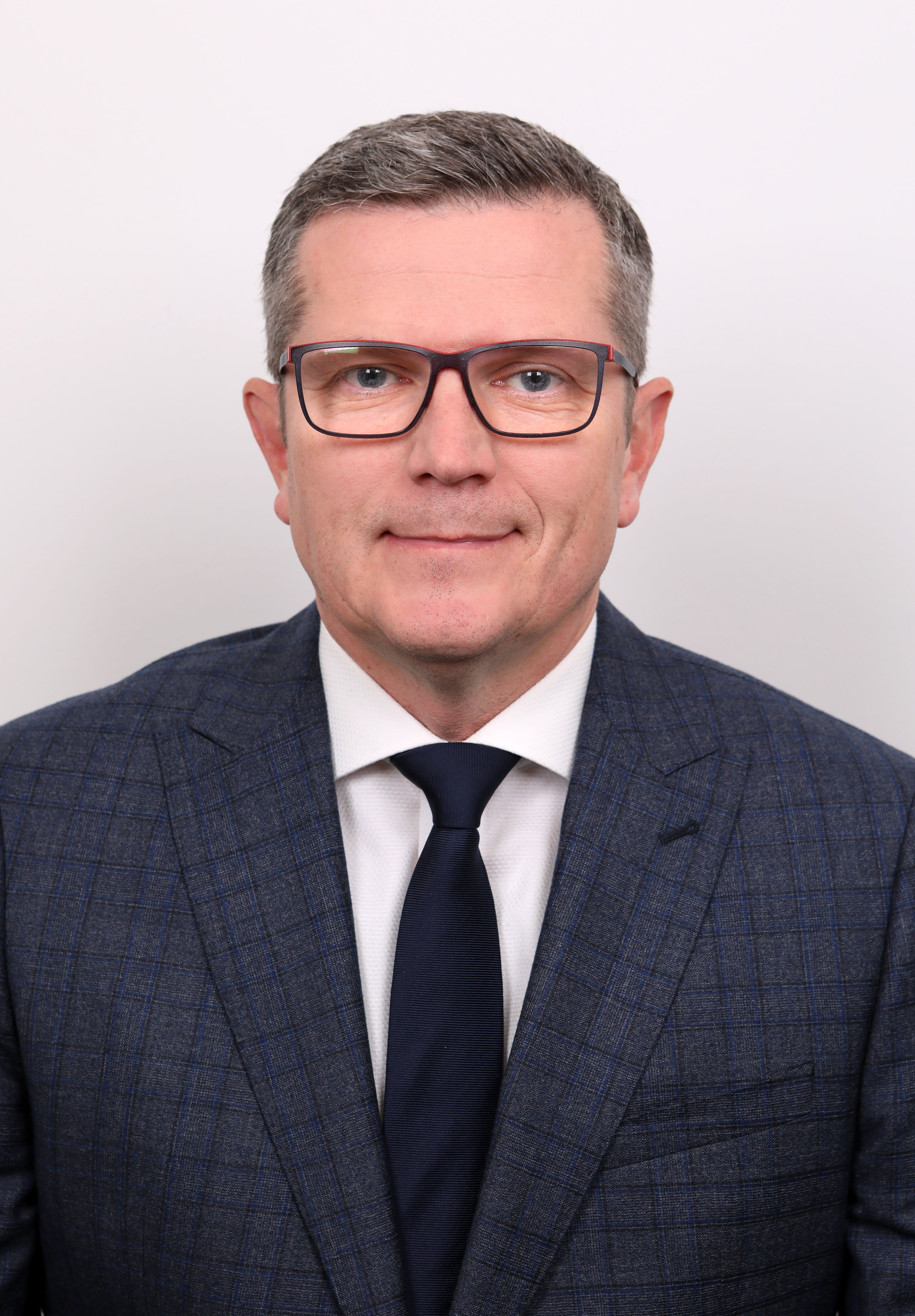

Member of the Senate of Poland

Personal details
- Born: 5 November 1970 (age 55) Poznań, Poland

Marcin Rafał Bosacki (born 5 November 1970) is a Polish politician and journalist. He was elected to the Senate of Poland (10th term) representing the constituency of Poznań.

He graduated from the Adam Mickiewicz University in Poznań. In 1990, he began his professional career at Gazeta Wyborcza daily. Between 2000 and 2006 he was head of its foreign affairs department. In 2007, he became paper's correspondent in Washington, D.C.

From 2010 to 2013, he was a spokesman at the Ministry of Foreign Affairs. In the years 2013–2016, he served as an Ambassador to Canada.

In 2019, he was elected as the member of the Senate of Poland. Member of the Civic Platform party.
