= Janusz Gromek =

Polish politician (born 1956)

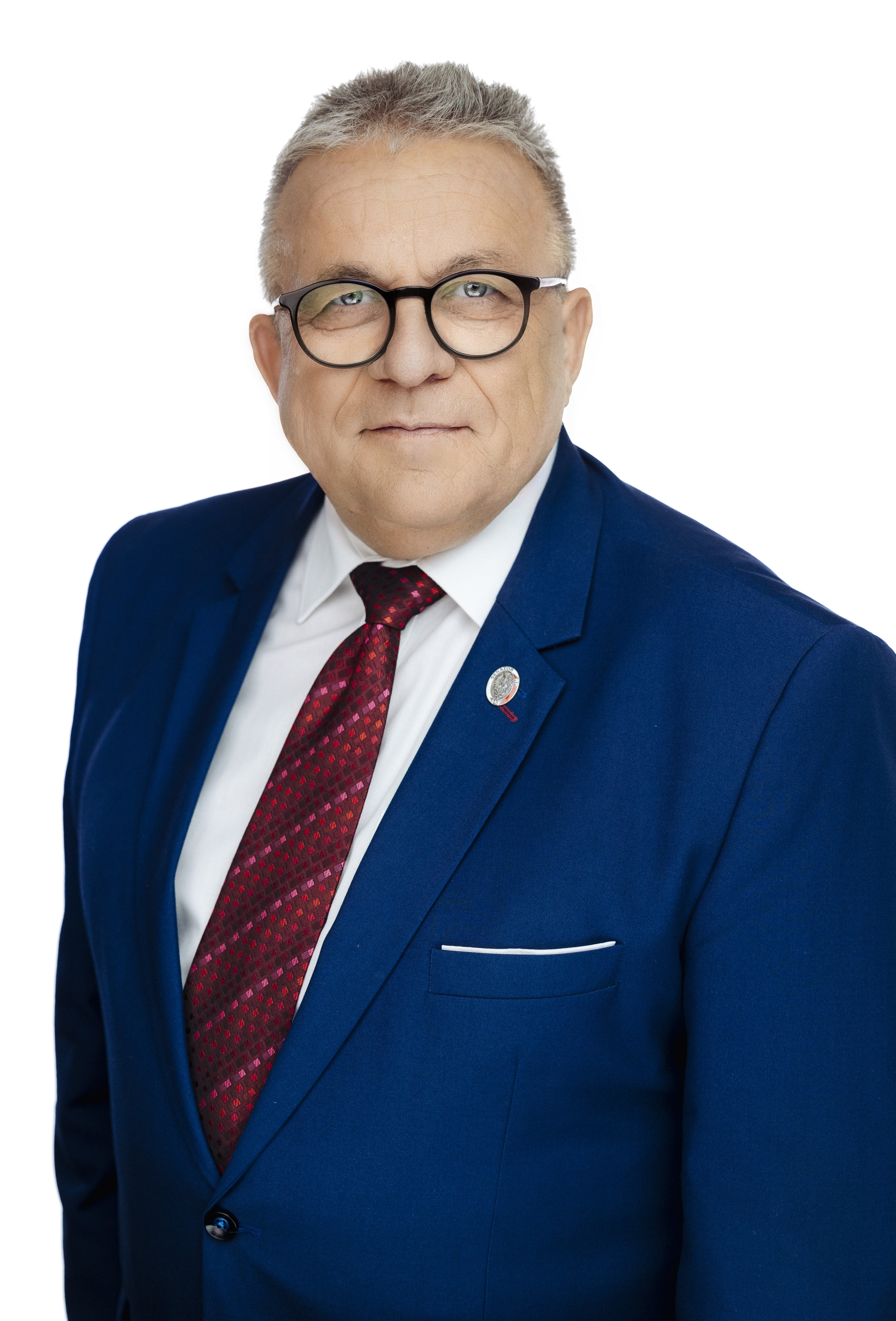

Member of the Senate of Poland for Poland's 99th Senate district
- Incumbent
- Assumed office 2019

Personal details
- Born: 4 July 1956 (age 69)
- Party: Civic Platform

Janusz Gromek (born 4 July 1956) is a Polish politician. He was elected to the Senate of Poland (10th term) representing the constituency of Koszalin. He was also elected to the 11th term.
