= Stanisław Gawłowski =

Polish politician (born 1968)

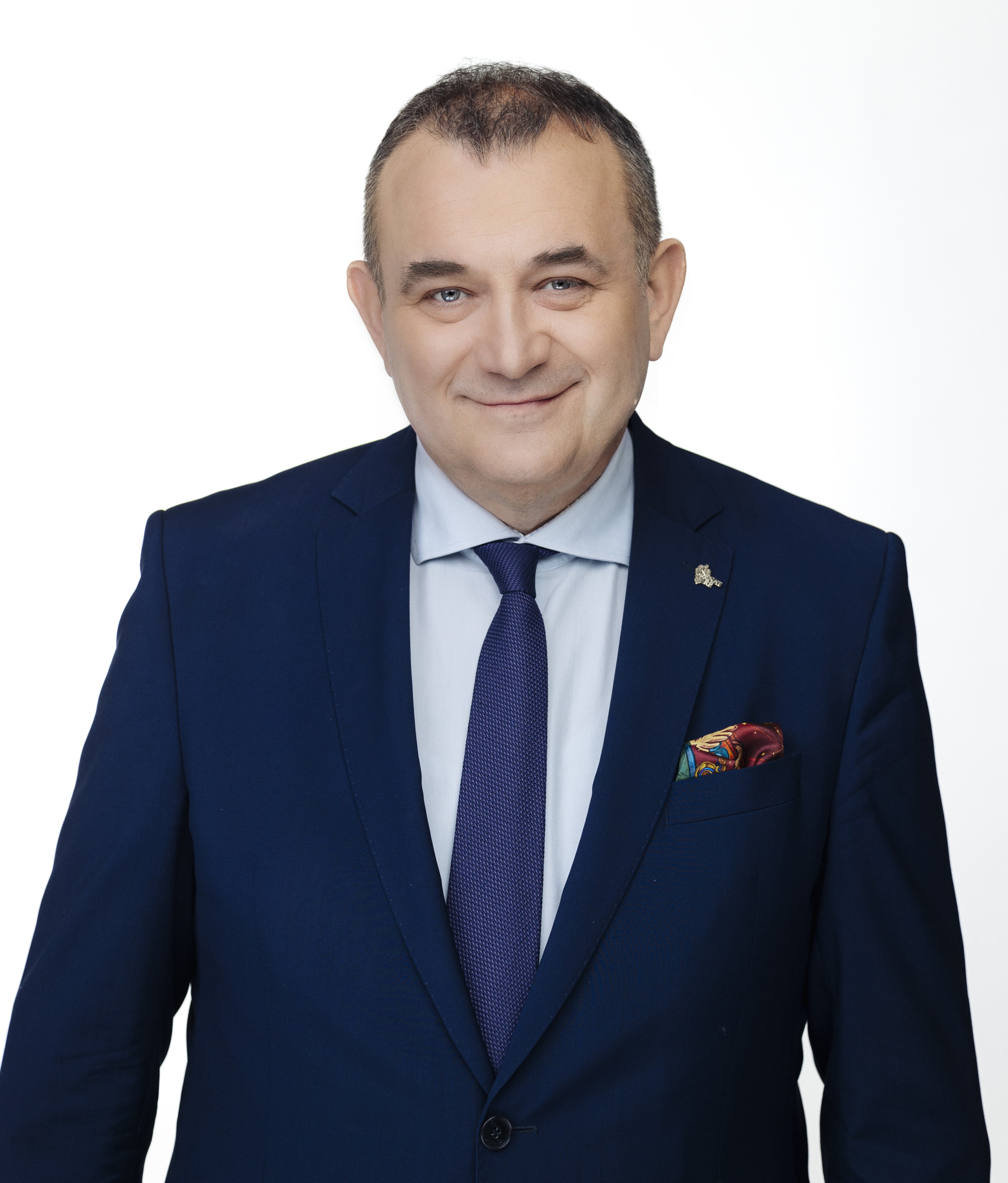

Member of Sejm
- In office 25 September 2005 – 11 November 2019

Senator
- Incumbent
- Assumed office 12 November 2019
- Preceded by: Piotr Zientarski

Personal details
- Born: 1968 (age 57–58)
- Party: Independent (currently), Civic Platform (earlier)

Stanisław Gawłowski (born 27 November 1968 in Rozyna, near Brzeg) is a Polish politician.

== Biography ==
He was elected to the Sejm on 25 September 2005, getting 7879 votes in 40 Koszalin district as a candidate from the Civic Platform list. In 2019 he was elected to the Senate as an independent candidate. He was reelected in 2023 as a candidate of the Civic Coalition.

He has been accused of corruption. On 31 July 2025, he was sentenced to 5 years in prison, a fine and a ban on holding management positions in state and local government institutions for 10 years.

== See also ==
- Members of Polish Sejm 2005-2007
