= Magdalena Kochan =

Polish politician (born 1950)

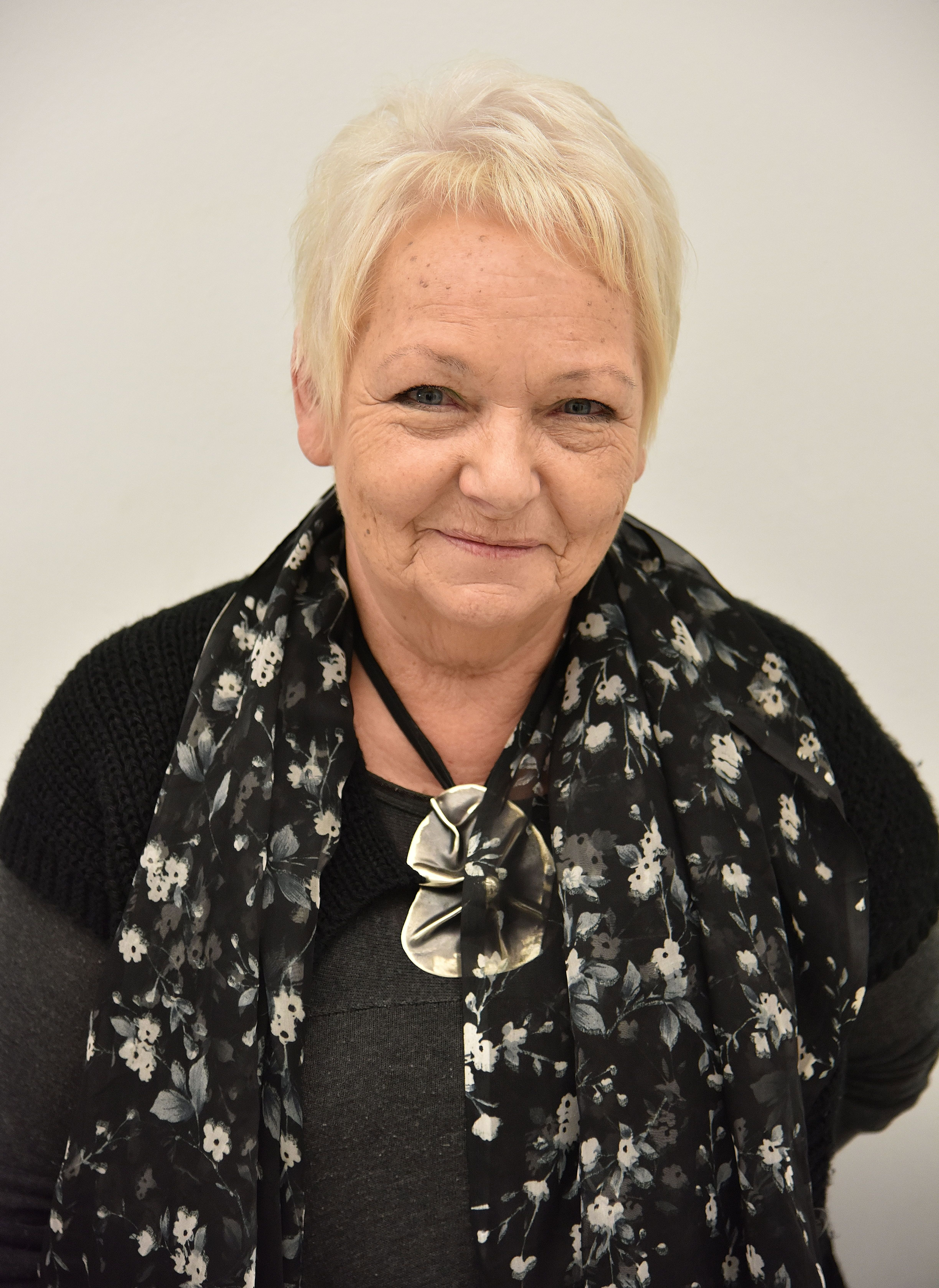

member of Sejm 2005-2007
- In office 25 September 2005 – ?

Personal details
- Born: 28 January 1950 (age 76)
- Party: Civic Platform

Magdalena Maria Kochan (born 28 January 1950 in Szczecin) is a Polish politician. She was elected to the Sejm on 25 September 2005, getting 6294 votes in 41 Szczecin district as a candidate from the Civic Platform list.

== See also ==
- Members of Polish Sejm 2005-2007
