= Ewa Gawęda =

Polish politician (born 1971)

Member of the Senate of Poland

Personal details
- Born: 2 July 1971 (age 54) Pszów, Wodzisław County, Poland
- Party: Law and Justice

Ewa Maria Gawęda (born 2 July 1971) is a Polish politician. She was elected to the Senate of Poland (10th term) representing the constituency of Bielsko-Biała.
