= Wiktor Durlak =

Polish politician (born 1983)

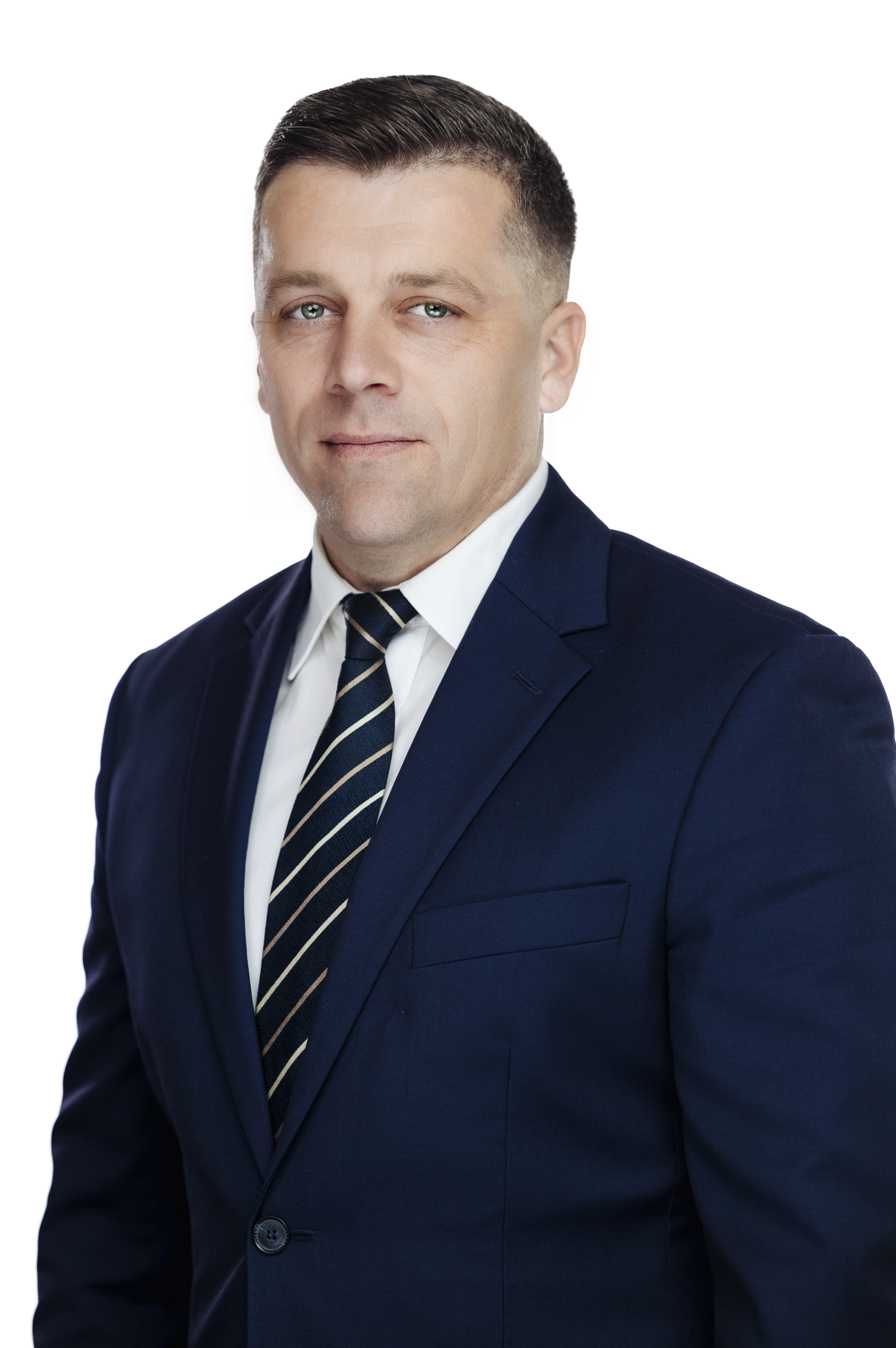
Wiktor Durlak (2023)

Wiktor Michał Durlak (born 5 July 1983) is a Polish politician. He was elected to the Senate of Poland (10th term) representing the constituency of Nowy Sącz. He was also elected to the 11th term.
