= Jan Maria Jackowski =

Polish politician (born 1958)

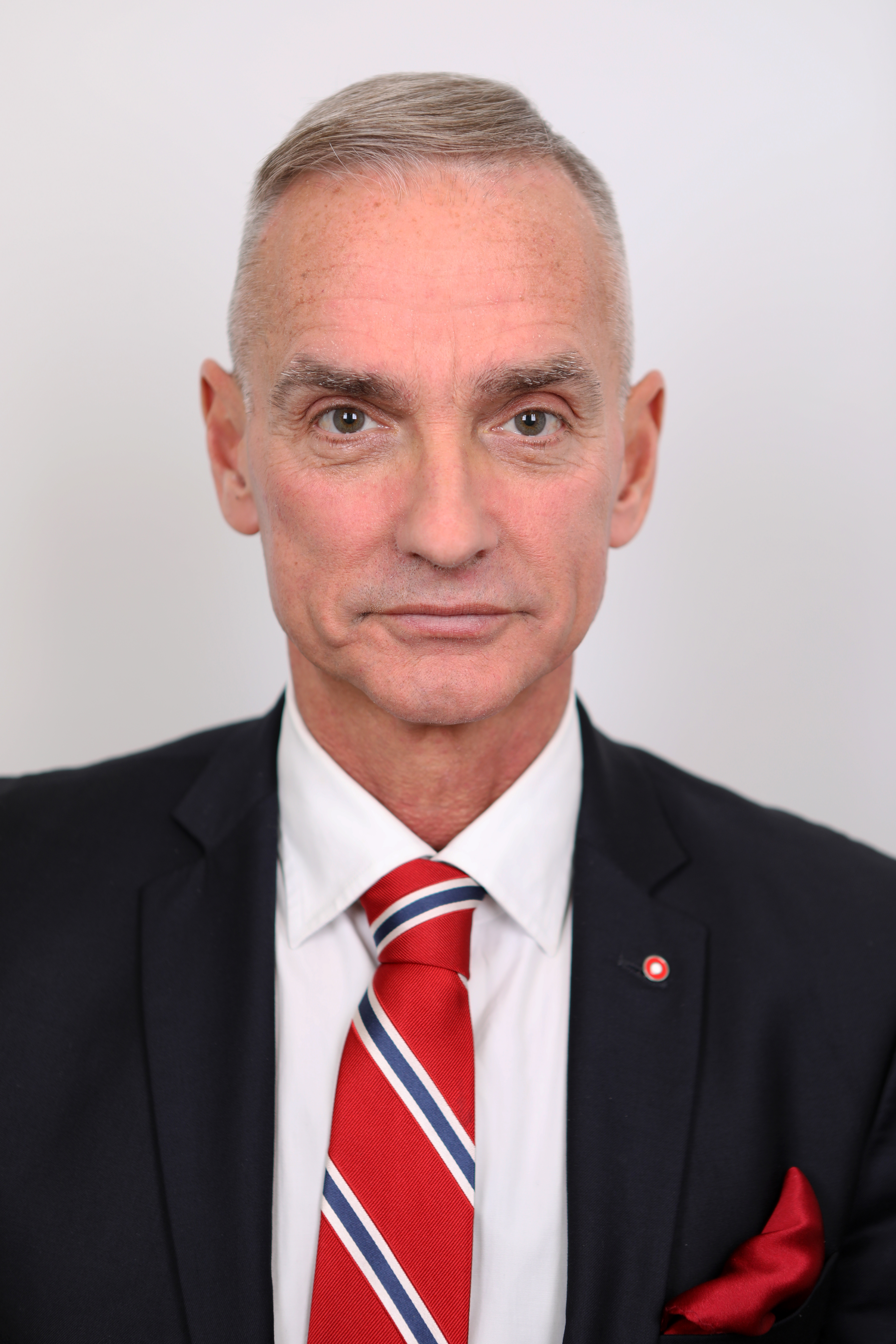

Member of the Senate of Poland
- In office 8 November 2011 – 13 November 2023

Personal details
- Born: 23 January 1958 (age 68)
- Children: 6
- Education: University of Warsaw

Jan Maria Jackowski (born 23 January 1958) is a Polish politician. He was elected to the Senate of Poland (10th term) representing the constituency of Płock. He was also elected to the 8th term (2011–2015) and 9th term (2015–2019) of the Senate of Poland.
