= Agnieszka Kołacz-Leszczyńska =

Polish politician and deputy (born 1972)

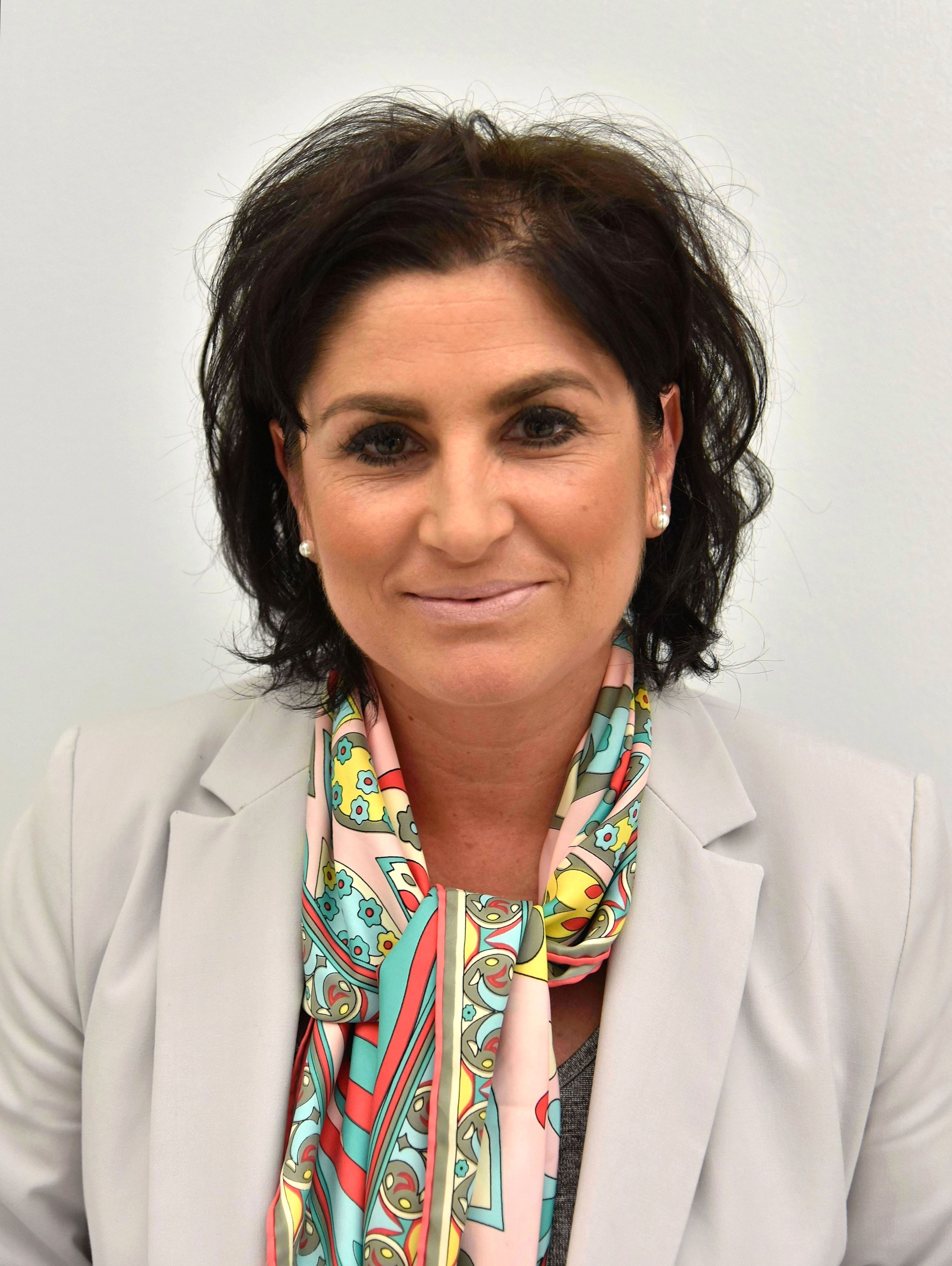

Member of the Senate of Poland
- Incumbent
- Assumed office 2019

Personal details
- Born: 19 October 1972 (age 53)
- Party: Civic Platform

Agnieszka Maria Kołacz-Leszczyńska (born 19 October 1972) is a Polish politician. Between 2006-2011 she was chairwoman of the city council in Wałbrzych. She was elected to the Sejm in 2011 and 2015, and to the Senate of Poland in October 2019.
