= Beniamin Godyla =

Polish politician (born 1965)

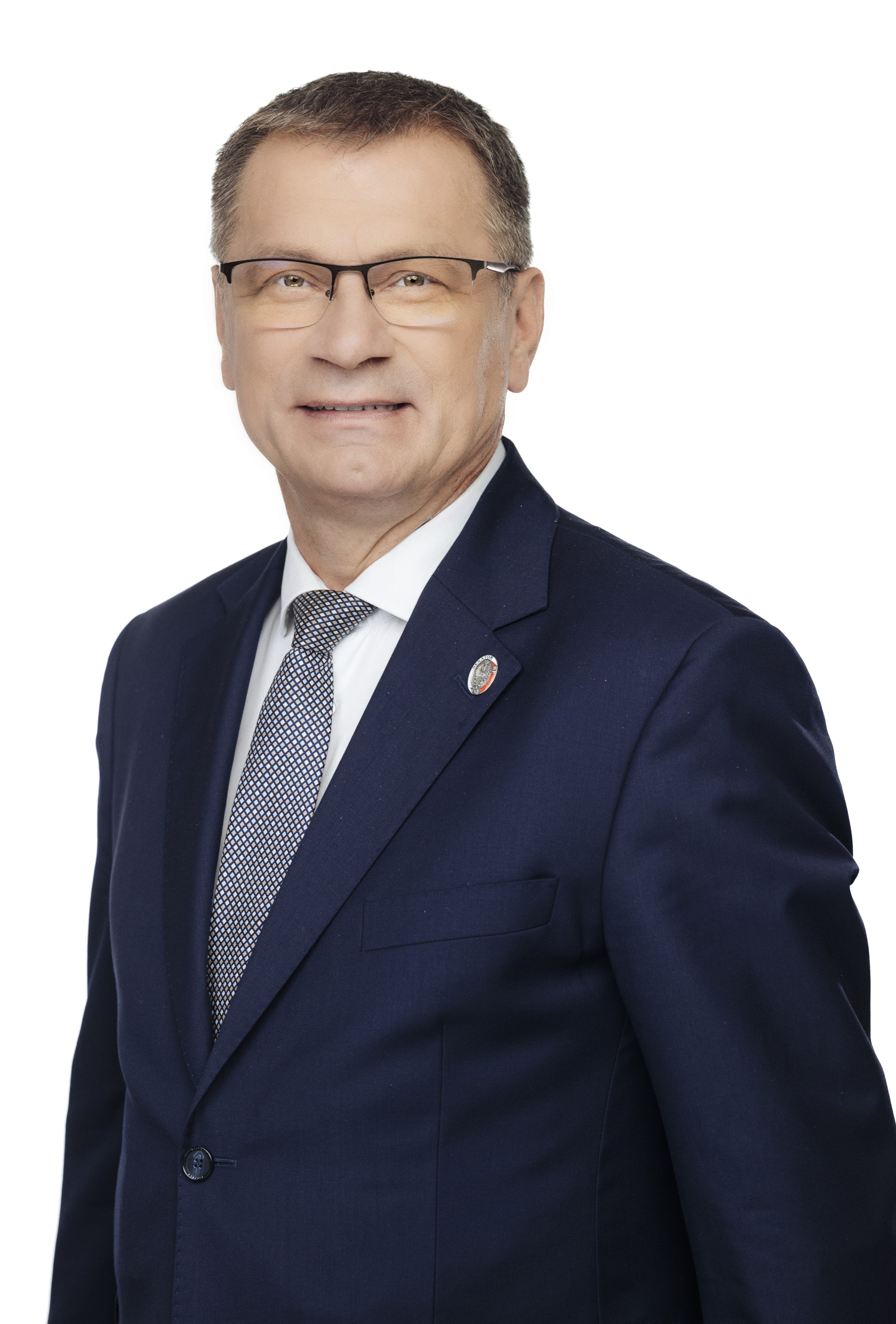
Beniamin Godyla (2023)

Beniamin Wincenty Godyla (born 8 July 1965) is a Polish politician. He was elected to the Senate of Poland (10th term) representing the constituency of Opole.
