= Marek Komorowski =

Polish politician (born 1959)

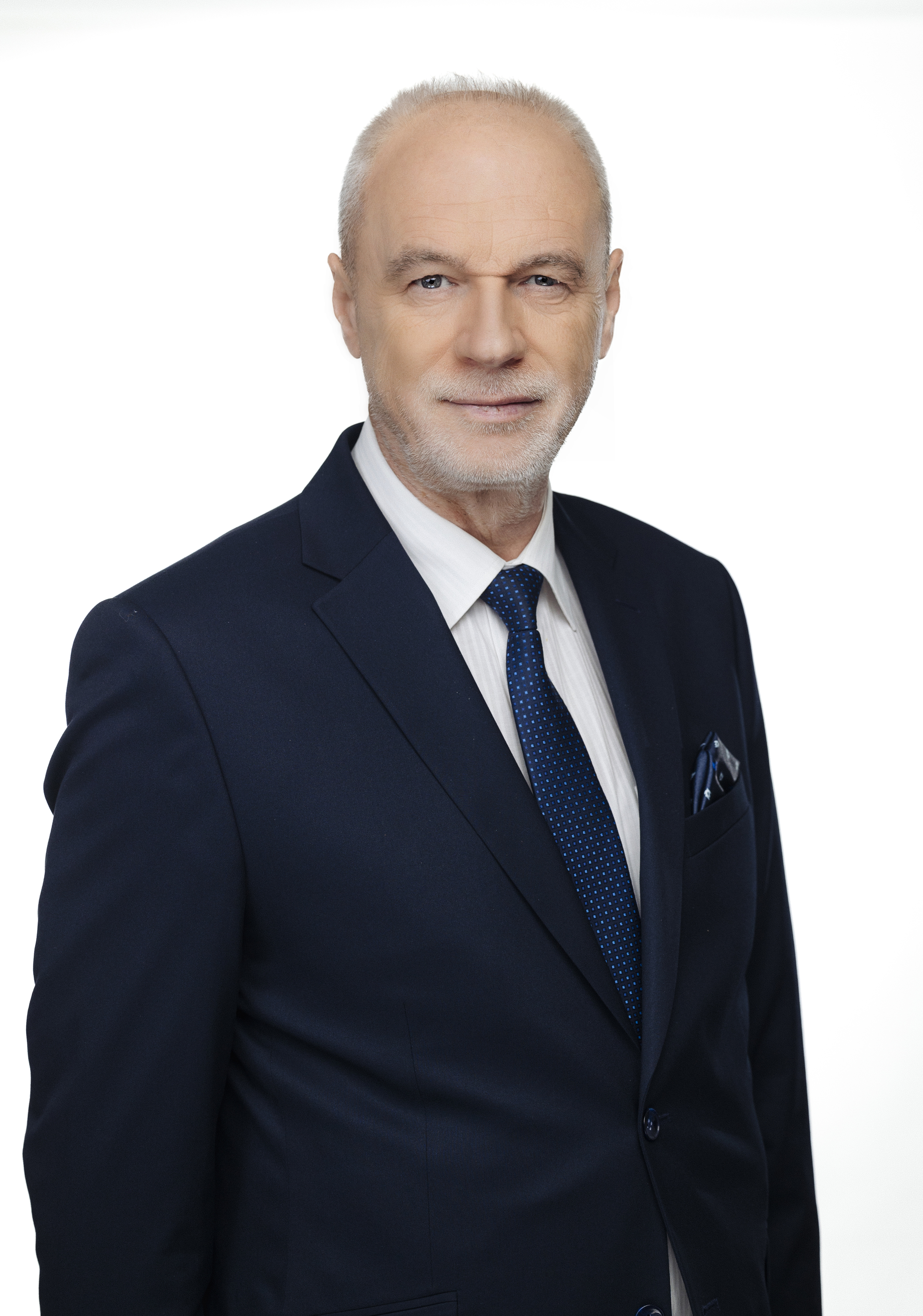

Member of the Senate of Poland

Personal details
- Born: 2 November 1959 (age 66)

Marek Adam Komorowski (born 2 November 1959) is a Polish politician. He was elected to the Senate of Poland (10th term) representing the constituency of Białystok. He was also elected to the 11th term.
