= Ryszard Świlski =

Polish politician (born 1971)

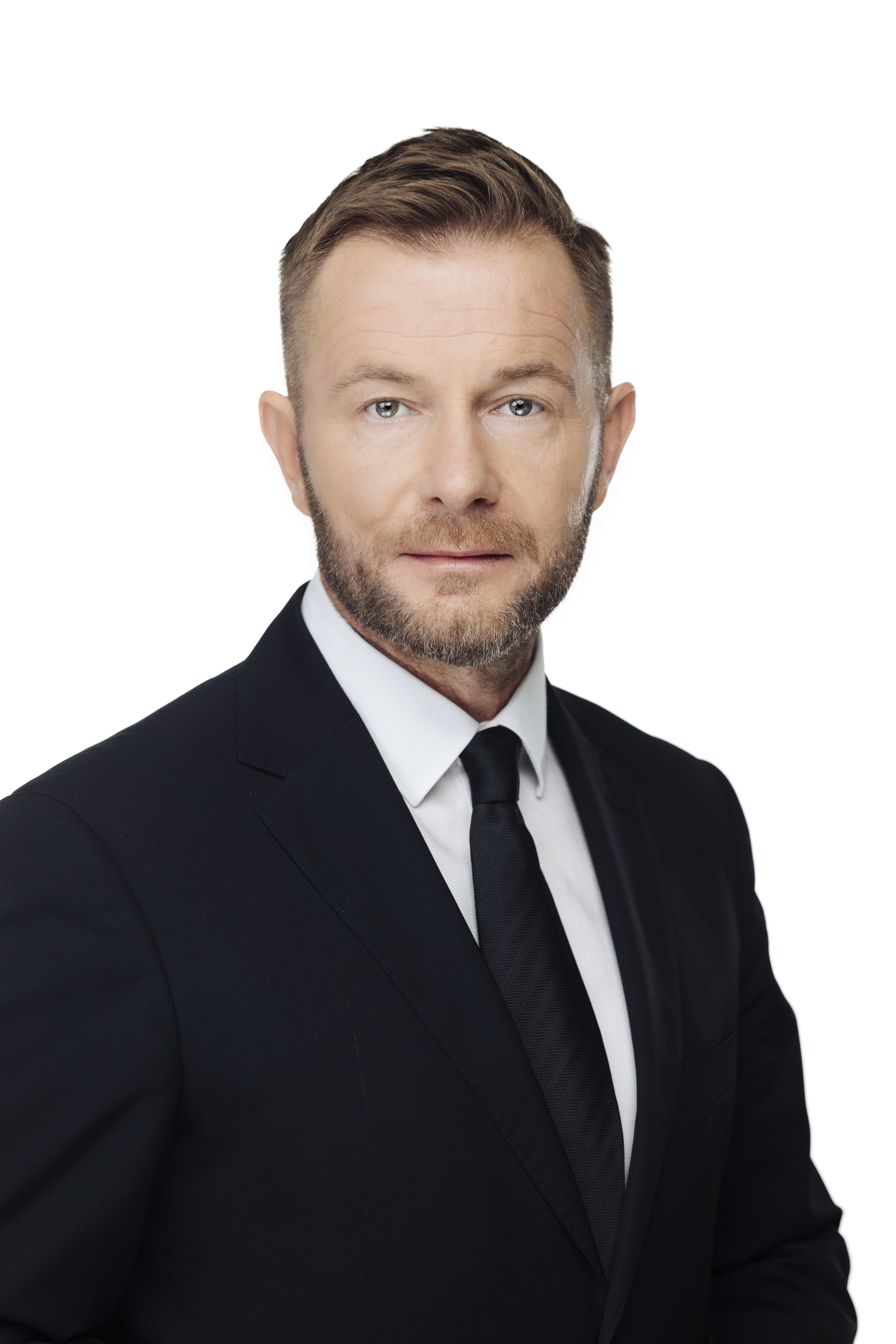

Member of the Senate of Poland

Personal details
- Born: 4 January 1971 (age 55)

Ryszard Jan Świlski (born 4 January 1971) is a Polish politician. He was elected to the Senate of Poland (10th term) representing the constituency of Gdańsk. He was also elected to the 11th term.
