= Beata Małecka-Libera =

Polish politician (born 1954)

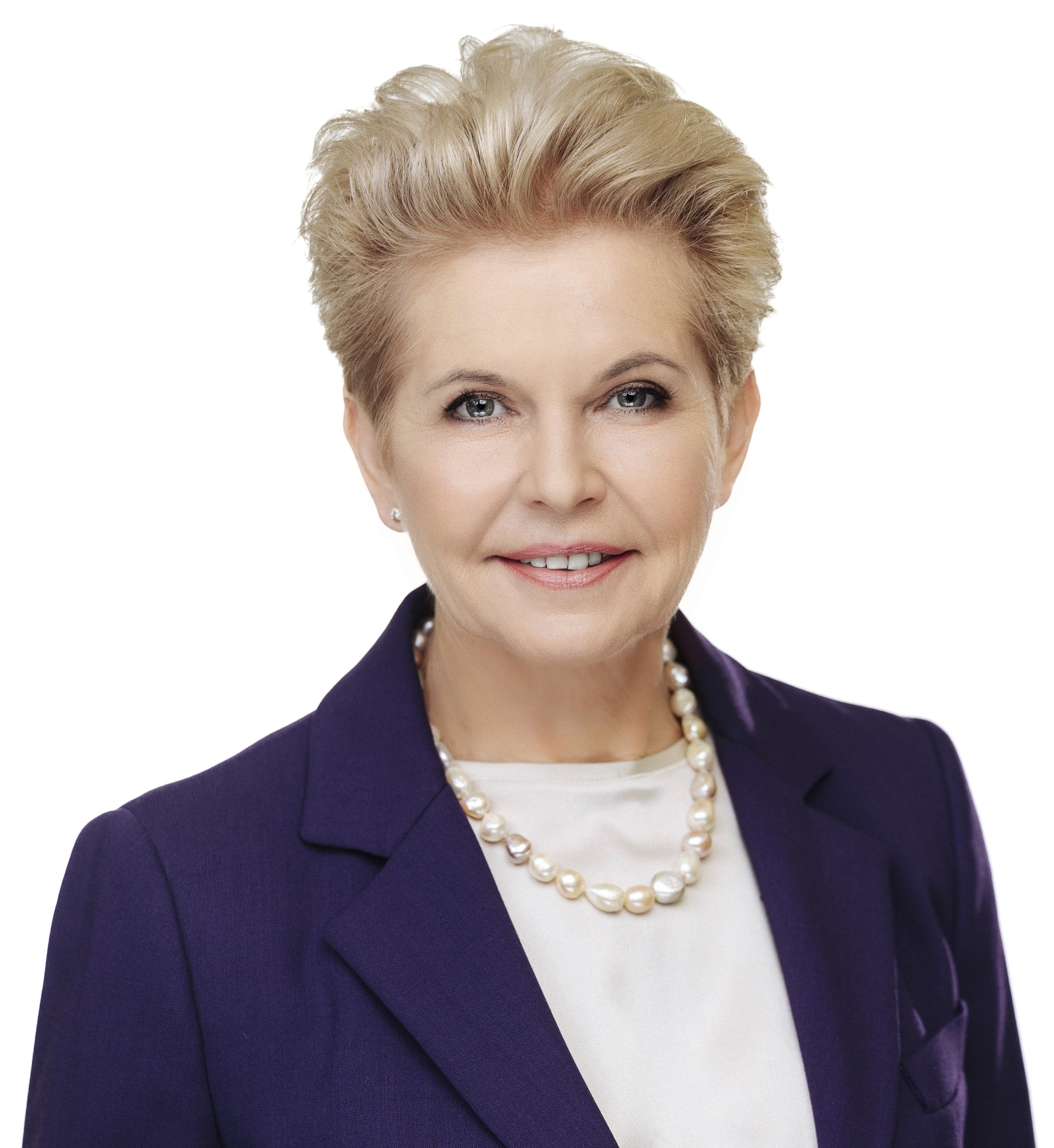

member of Sejm 2005-2007
- Incumbent
- Assumed office 25 September 2005

Personal details
- Born: 17 May 1954 (age 72)
- Party: Civic Platform

Beata Małecka-Libera (born 17 May 1954 in Dąbrowa Górnicza) is a Polish politician. She was elected to the Sejm on 25 September 2005, getting 6882 votes in 32 Sosnowiec district as a candidate from the Civic Platform list.

== See also ==
- Members of Polish Sejm 2005-2007
- Politics of Poland
