= Ewa Matecka =

Polish politician (born 1956)

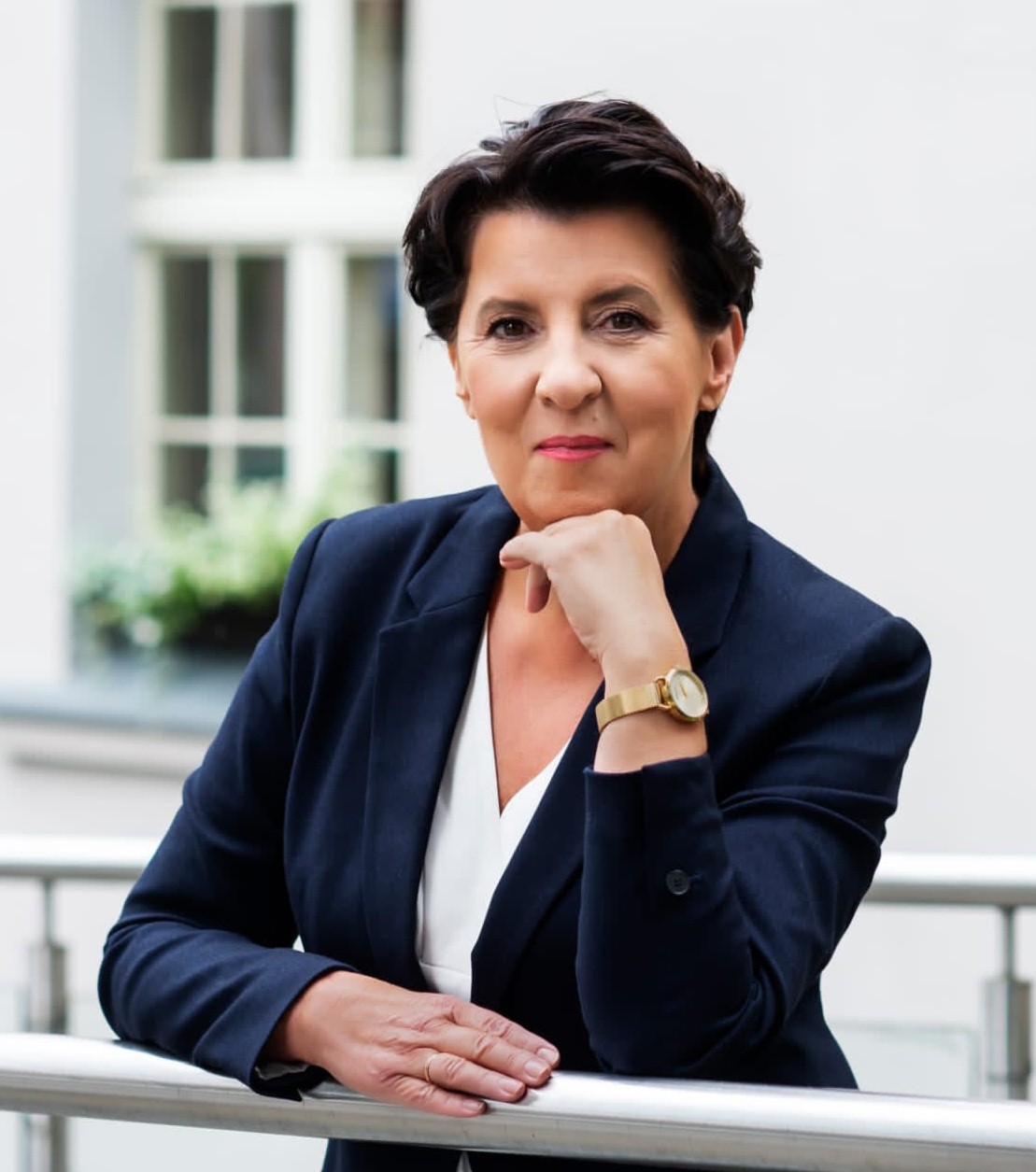

Member of the Senate of Poland

Personal details
- Born: 3 November 1956 (age 69)

Ewa Jolanta Matecka (born 3 November 1956) is a Polish politician. In 2019 she was elected to the Senate of Poland 10th term representing the constituency of Kalisz. On October 15, 2023, she has been re-elected to the 11th term. Before in the period of 2014-2019, she was a local government official in the city of Ostrów Wielkopolski, serving, among others, as the Vice-President of the City.
