= Dorota Tobiszowska =

Polish politician (born 1966)

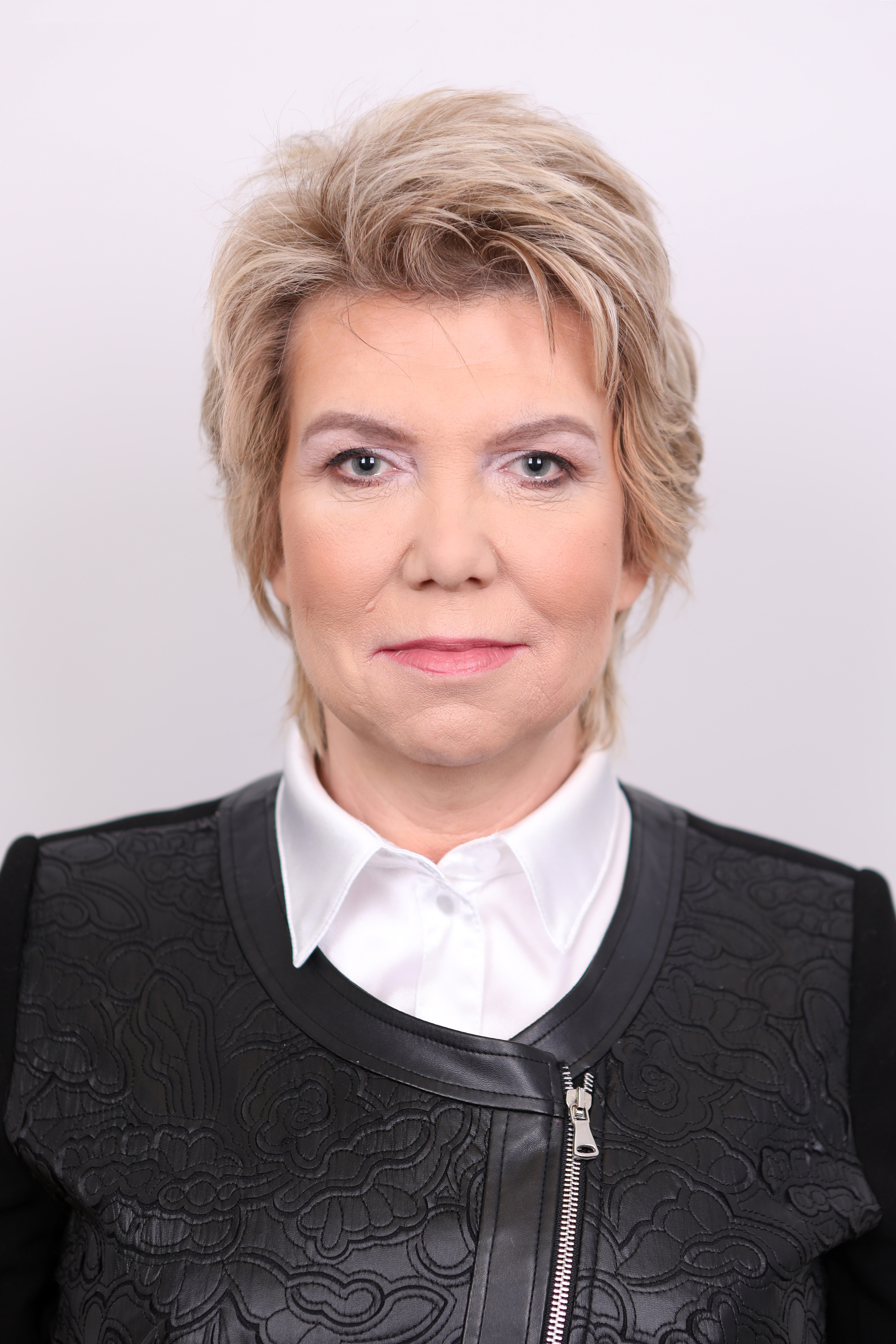

Member of the Senate of Poland

Personal details
- Born: 14 December 1966 (age 59)

Dorota Jolanta Tobiszowska (born 14 December 1966) is a Polish politician. She was elected to the Senate of Poland (10th term) representing the constituency of Katowice.
