= Agnieszka Gorgoń-Komor =

Polish politician (born 1970)

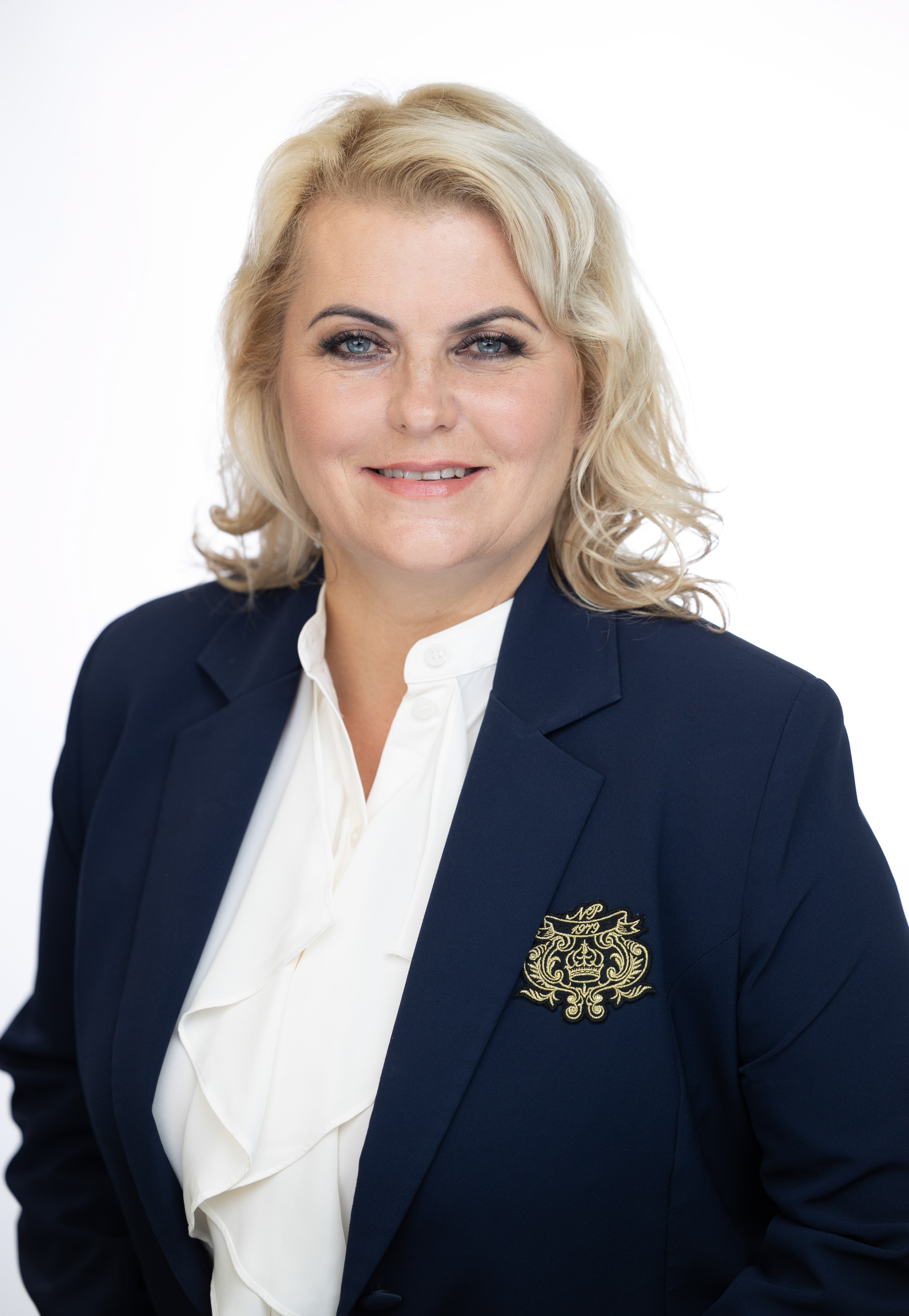

Member of the Senate of Poland

Personal details
- Born: 10 June 1970 (age 56) Czechowice-Dziedzice, Polish People's Republic
- Party: Civic Coalition
- Education: Jagiellonian University Medical College
- Profession: Doctor, politician

Agnieszka Aleksandra Gorgoń-Komor (née Gorgoń; born 10 June 1970) is a Polish politician. She was elected to the Senate of Poland (10th term) representing the constituency of Bielsko-Biała. She was also elected to the 11th term.

== Career ==
Gorgoń-Komor graduated from the Jagiellonian University Medical College in Kraków, and later the Postgraduate School of Aesthetic Medicine in Warsaw. She specialized in internal medicine and cardiology. She became a senior assistant in the cardiology department of the voivodeship hospital, then deputy head of the cardiology department of the Beskid Oncology Center at the John Paul II municipal hospital in Bielsko-Biała. She also started a private practice in cardiology and aesthetic medicine.

She co-organized "white Saturdays" and "white Sundays", social campaigns for the preventative diagnosis of cardiovascular diseases and lifestyle diseases, and Beskid Heart Day. She was the author of the project "Family Doctor Academy". She served as deputy secretary of the district medical council, in 2013 she became the coordinator of the training center of the Beskid Medical Office. She is associated with the Podbeskidzie Congress of Women, a feminist organization.

She is an activist of Civic Platform. In the 2014 Polish local elections, she was elected as a councilor of Biesko-Biała, receiving 759 votes. She successfully ran for reelection in the 2018 Polish local elections, receiving 2,173 votes.

In the 2019 Polish parliamentary election as a member of Civic Coalition, she was elected to the Senate of the 10th term, representing electoral district 78, receiving 114,113 votes. She was reelected in the 2023 Polish parliamentary election, receiving 127,604 votes. As of May 2025, she is a member of two committees in the Senate: the Family, Senior and Social Policy Commission and the Health Committee.

== Views ==
Gorgoń-Komor supports a comprehensive national cervical cancer elimination strategy in Poland, specifically citing similar programs in Australia, England, and Canada. Though Poland already has a national HPV-vaccination programme, Gorgoń-Komor said that it suffers from a lack of communication and education surrounding vaccines, as well as disinformation on social media.

She supports obesity prevention and treatment programs by the Polish government, and said that doctors must be trained in communicating with obese patients effectively. She also stated that obesity must be destigmatized in Polish society, as shame prevents obese people from seeking help. She highlighted the link between obesity and Type 2 diabetes.

In 2019, she criticized alleged mishandling of the health system by the ruling party, Law and Justice, especially the change in hospital funding to a flat-rate system. She said that this change "forces us [doctors] to somehow predict how many people will get sick" and also reimbursed the hospitals for far less than their expenses, which encouraged hospitals to turn away "particularly cost-intensive patients".
