= Artur Dunin =

Polish politician (born 1969)

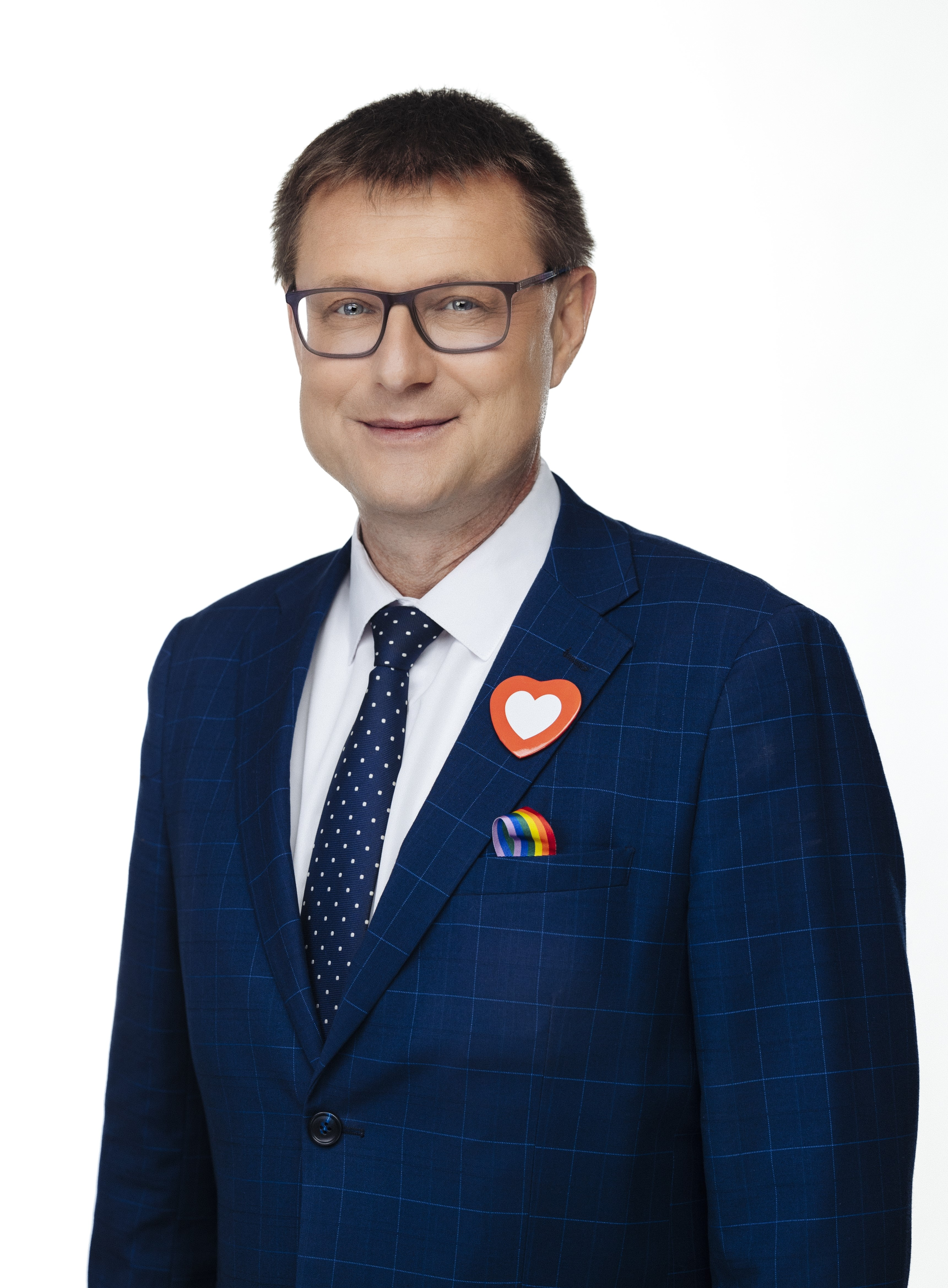
Artur Dunin (2023)

Artur Jerzy Dunin (born 10 March 1969) is a Polish politician. He was elected to the Senate of Poland (10th term) representing the constituency of Łódź. He was also elected to the 11th term.
