= Joanna Sekuła =

Polish politician (born 1961)

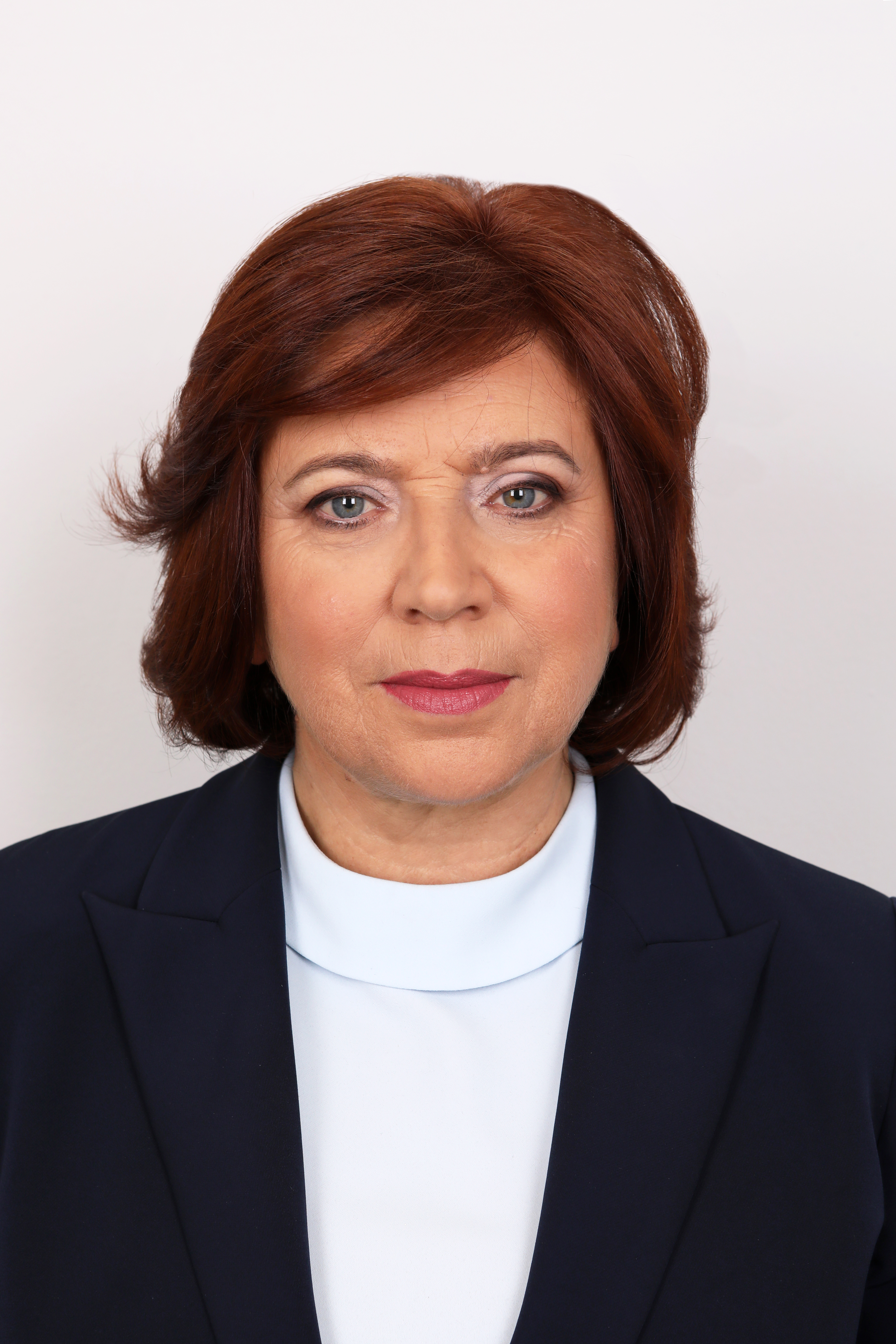

Member of the Senate of Poland

Personal details
- Born: 17 March 1961 (age 65)

Joanna Sekuła (born 17 March 1961) is a Polish politician. She was elected to the Senate of Poland (10th term) representing the constituency of Katowice.
