= List of Polish senators (2023–2027) =

There are 100 members of the Senate of Poland that were elected in the 2023 Polish parliamentary election. They were all elected in 100 single-member constituencies. The Senate Pact 2023 alliance won 66 out of 100 seats.

They sit as part of the upper house of the 10th term Sejm and 11th term Senate of Poland.

== Composition ==
As of 18 March 2026, senators are affiliated with following parliamentary groups:

Parliamentary group	Affiliates	Chairperson	Senators		
Parliamentary group	Affiliates	Chairperson	Initial	Current	+/–
Civic Coalition (KO); Klub Parlamentarny Koalicja Obywatelska - Platforma Obywatelska	Civic Coalition (37)	Zbigniew Konwiński; MP, (Note: The chairperson of the parliamentary group seats in the parliament as a member of the Sejm.) chair Tomasz Grodzki; Leader in the Senate	41	43	▲2
Civic Coalition (KO); Klub Parlamentarny Koalicja Obywatelska - Platforma Obywatelska	Independents (6)	Zbigniew Konwiński; MP, chair Tomasz Grodzki; Leader in the Senate	41	43	▲2
Law and Justice (PiS); Klub Parlamentarny Prawo i Sprawiedliwość	Law and Justice (30)	Mariusz Błaszczak; MP, chair Stanisław Karczewski; Vice-chair	34	33	▼1
Law and Justice (PiS); Klub Parlamentarny Prawo i Sprawiedliwość	Independents (3)	Mariusz Błaszczak; MP, chair Stanisław Karczewski; Vice-chair	34	33	▼1
Third Way (TD); Klub Senacki Trzecia Droga	Poland 2050 (1)	Waldemar Pawlak	12	8	▼4
Third Way (TD); Klub Senacki Trzecia Droga	Polish People's Party (4)	Waldemar Pawlak	12	8	▼4
Third Way (TD); Klub Senacki Trzecia Droga	Centre for Poland (1)	Waldemar Pawlak	12	8	▼4
Third Way (TD); Klub Senacki Trzecia Droga	Union of European; Democrats (1)	Waldemar Pawlak	12	8	▼4
Third Way (TD); Klub Senacki Trzecia Droga	Independents (1)	Waldemar Pawlak	12	8	▼4
The Left (L); Koalicyjny Klub Parlamentarny Lewicy	New Left (4)	Anna Maria Żukowska; MP, chair Anna Górska; Vice-chair; Maciej Kopiec; Vice-chair	9	8	▼1
The Left (L); Koalicyjny Klub Parlamentarny Lewicy	Independents (2)	Anna Maria Żukowska; MP, chair Anna Górska; Vice-chair; Maciej Kopiec; Vice-chair	9	8	▼1
The Left (L); Koalicyjny Klub Parlamentarny Lewicy	Labour Union (1)	Anna Maria Żukowska; MP, chair Anna Górska; Vice-chair; Maciej Kopiec; Vice-chair	9	8	▼1
The Left (L); Koalicyjny Klub Parlamentarny Lewicy	Polish Socialist Party (1)	Anna Maria Żukowska; MP, chair Anna Górska; Vice-chair; Maciej Kopiec; Vice-chair	9	8	▼1
New Poland – Centre (NP–C); Klub Senacki Nowa Polska – Centrum (Note: Formerly Independent and Self-Governing (Koło Senackie Niezależni i Samorządni, NiS) until 28 January 2026 and New Poland (Nowa Polska) until 18 March, when it merged with the Centre Poland (Centrum Polska, Centrum) group which was established on 18 February.)	New Poland (3)	Grzegorz Fedorowicz; Chair; Andrzej Dziuba; Vice-chair	4	7	▲3
New Poland – Centre (NP–C); Klub Senacki Nowa Polska – Centrum	Centre Poland (4)	Grzegorz Fedorowicz; Chair; Andrzej Dziuba; Vice-chair	4	7	▲3
Non-affiliated (N-A)	Independents (1)	—	0	1	▲1
Total			100	100	
Vacancies			—	0	

== List ==
The incumbent senators are:

Const.	Electoral list	Senator	Parliamentary group	Party	# of votes	% of votes
1	The Left (Note: Officially registered as Nowa Lewica (New Left) party list, which also included candidates of other The Left coalition parties.)	Waldemar Witkowski	The Left	Labour Union	55,372	39.36
2	Civic Coalition	Marcin Zawiła	Civic Coalition	Civic Coalition	61,199	42.03
3	The Left	Małgorzata Sekuła-Szmajdzińska	The Left	New Left	82,511	38.37
4	Civic Coalition	Agnieszka Kołacz-Leszczyńska	Civic Coalition	Civic Coalition	94,659	58.68
5	Law and Justice	Aleksander Szwed	Law and Justice	Law and Justice	56,101	35.77
6	Third Way	Kazimierz Ujazdowski	Third Way	Centre for Poland	177,158	48.64
7	Civic Coalition	Grzegorz Schetyna	Civic Coalition	Civic Coalition	113,815	61.21
8	Civic Coalition	Barbara Zdrojewska	Civic Coalition	Civic Coalition	136,168	62.09
9	Civic Coalition	Andrzej Kobiak	Civic Coalition	Civic Coalition	191,824	58.31
10	Civic Coalition	Ryszard Brejza	Civic Coalition	Independent	90,083	44.06
11	Civic Coalition	Tomasz Lenz	Civic Coalition	Civic Coalition	128,755	66.98
12	Third Way	Ryszard Bober	Third Way	Polish People's Party	82,726	51.00
13	New Left	Stanisław Pawlak (Note: By-elected on 21 July 2024. Took office on 24 July 2024. Replaced Krzysztof Kukucki.)	The Left	New Left	9,888	46.30
14	Law and Justice	Stanisław Gogacz	Law and Justice	Law and Justice	118,844	52.82
15	Law and Justice	Grzegorz Czelej	Law and Justice	Law and Justice	119,498	52.50
16	Third Way	Jacek Trela	New Poland – Centre	Centre Poland	93,316	48.48
17	Law and Justice	Grzegorz Bierecki	Law and Justice	Independent	71,167	53.74
18	KWW (Note: KWW: Komited Wyborczy Wyborców, Voters' Electoral Committee, an independent candidate running solely with a support of individual citizines.)	Józef Zając	Third Way	Independent	50,763	44.09
19	Law and Justice	Jerzy Chróścikowski	Law and Justice	Law and Justice	97,647	47.61
20	Third Way	Mirosław Różański	New Poland – Centre	Centre Poland	104,047	59.15
21	Civic Coalition	Władysław Komarnicki	Civic Coalition	Civic Coalition	108,863	58.14
22	KWW	Wadim Tyszkiewicz	New Poland – Centre	New Poland	97,636	67.95
23	Civic Coalition	Artur Dunin	Civic Coalition	Civic Coalition	155,496	71.81
24	KWW	Krzysztof Kwiatkowski	Civic Coalition	Civic Coalition	139,689	59.90
25	Law and Justice	Przemysław Błaszczyk	Law and Justice	Law and Justice	67,405	46.84
26	The Left	Marcin Karpiński	The Left	New Left	98,107	50.14
27	Law and Justice	Michał Seweryński	Law and Justice	Independent	87,381	45.47
28	Law and Justice	Wiesław Dobkowski	Law and Justice	Law and Justice	87,843	41.04
29	Law and Justice	Rafał Ambrozik	Law and Justice	Independent	84,981	46.28
30	Law and Justice	Andrzej Pająk	Law and Justice	Law and Justice	152,526	41.94
31	Law and Justice	Marek Pęk	Law and Justice	Law and Justice	112,571	43.93
32	Civic Coalition	Jerzy Fedorowicz	Civic Coalition	Civic Coalition	151,792	67.06
33	Civic Coalition	Monika Piątkowska (Note: By-elected on 16 March 2025. Took office on 26 March 2025. Replaced Bogdan Klich.)	Civic Coalition	Independent	25,022	50.14
34	Law and Justice	Włodzimierz Bernacki	Law and Justice	Law and Justice	98,347	46.42
35	Law and Justice	Kazimierz Wiatr	Law and Justice	Law and Justice	89,582	47.12
36	Law and Justice	Jan Hamerski	Law and Justice	Law and Justice	109,899	54.14
37	Law and Justice	Wiktor Durlak	Law and Justice	Law and Justice	116,069	52.71
38	Third Way	Waldemar Pawlak	Third Way	Polish People's Party	113,143	42.37
39	Law and Justice	Krzysztof Bieńkowski	Law and Justice	Law and Justice	80,567	47.25
40	Civic Coalition	Jolanta Hibner	Civic Coalition	Civic Coalition	171,541	48.23
41	Third Way	Michał Kamiński	Third Way	Union of European Democrats	198,074	53.44
42	Civic Coalition	Marek Borowski	Civic Coalition	Civic Coalition	178,104	69.72
43	Civic Coalition	Małgorzata Kidawa-Błońska	Civic Coalition	Civic Coalition	231,122	74.70
44	Civic Coalition	Adam Bodnar	Civic Coalition	Independent	628,442	76.47
45	The Left	Magdalena Biejat	The Left	Independent	204,934	72.40
46	Law and Justice	Robert Mamątow	Law and Justice	Law and Justice	89,104	43.09
47	Law and Justice	Maciej Górski	Law and Justice	Law and Justice	96,148	51.11
48	Law and Justice	Waldemar Kraska	Law and Justice	Law and Justice	69,725	51.57
49	Law and Justice	Stanisław Karczewski	Law and Justice	Law and Justice	71,115	51.78
50	Law and Justice	Wojciech Skurkiewicz	Law and Justice	Law and Justice	121,080	47.96
51	Civic Coalition	Tadeusz Jarmuziewicz	Civic Coalition	Civic Coalition	88,689	46.76
52	The Left	Piotr Woźniak	Civic Coalition	Civic Coalition	68,452	52.29
53	Civic Coalition	Beniamin Godyla	Civic Coalition	Civic Coalition	78,843	50.40
54	Law and Justice	Janina Sagatowska	Law and Justice	Law and Justice	89,961	53.49
55	Law and Justice	Zdzisław Pupa	Law and Justice	Law and Justice	139,782	57.66
56	Law and Justice	Józef Jodłowski	Law and Justice	Law and Justice	109,935	42.53
57	Law and Justice	Alicja Zając	Law and Justice	Law and Justice	98,783	56.72
58	Law and Justice	Mieczysław Golba	Law and Justice	Law and Justice	131,649	49.20
59	Law and Justice	Marek Komorowski	Law and Justice	Law and Justice	108,827	48.25
60	Third Way	Maciej Żywno	Third Way	Poland 2050	139,531	49.58
61	Law and Justice	Anna Bogucka	Law and Justice	Law and Justice	46,935	46.94
62	Civic Coalition	Kazimierz Kleina	Civic Coalition	Civic Coalition	143,653	57.84
63	The Left	Anna Górska	The Left	Independent	89,216	38.17
64	Civic Coalition	Sławomir Rybicki	Civic Coalition	Civic Coalition	142,131	73.16
65	Civic Coalition	Bogdan Borusewicz	Civic Coalition	Civic Coalition	223,227	70.12
66	Civic Coalition	Ryszard Świlski	Civic Coalition	Civic Coalition	104,759	56.91
67	Civic Coalition	Leszek Czarnobaj	Civic Coalition	Civic Coalition	56,152	52.56
68	Law and Justice	Ryszard Majer	Law and Justice	Law and Justice	73,331	36.07
69	The Left	Wojciech Konieczny	The Left	Polish Socialist Party	59,980	49.44
70	KWW	Zygmunt Frankiewicz	New Poland – Centre	New Poland	157,302	67.78
71	Civic Coalition	Halina Bieda	Civic Coalition	Civic Coalition	81,986	57.70
72	Civic Coalition	Henryk Siedlaczek	Civic Coalition	Independent	80,430	39.30
73	Third Way	Piotr Masłowski	New Poland – Centre	Centre Poland	69,713	40.86
74	Civic Coalition	Gabriela Morawska-Stanecka	Civic Coalition	Independent	100,480	47.75
75	KWW	Andrzej Dziuba	New Poland – Centre	New Poland	81,134	56.65
76	Civic Coalition	Beata Małecka-Libera	Civic Coalition	Civic Coalition	113,692	52.37
77	Civic Coalition	Joanna Sekuła	Civic Coalition	Civic Coalition	87,687	55.16
78	Civic Coalition	Agnieszka Gorgoń-Komor	Civic Coalition	Civic Coalition	127,604	49.45
79	Law and Justice	Andrzej Kalata	Law and Justice	Law and Justice	73,276	39.59
80	The Left	Maciej Kopiec	The Left	New Left	86,070	51.50
81	Law and Justice	Jacek Włosowicz	Non-affiliated	Independent	110,365	49.01
82	Law and Justice	Jarosław Rusiecki	Law and Justice	Law and Justice	80,763	39.47
83	Law and Justice	Krzysztof Słoń	Law and Justice	Law and Justice	91,662	40.04
84	Civic Coalition	Jerzy Wcisła	Civic Coalition	Civic Coalition	86,158	57.04
85	Third Way	Gustaw Brzezin	Third Way	Polish People's Party	73,391	49.06
86	Civic Coalition	Ewa Kaliszuk	Civic Coalition	Civic Coalition	93,766	43.78
87	Civic Coalition	Jolanta Piotrowska	Civic Coalition	Civic Coalition	78,072	43.25
88	Civic Coalition	Adam Szejnfeld	Civic Coalition	Civic Coalition	105,030	49.81
89	Third Way	Jan Filip Libicki	Third Way	Polish People's Party	119,190	58.34
90	Civic Coalition	Waldy Dzikowski	Civic Coalition	Civic Coalition	190,681	75.07
91	Civic Coalition	Rafał Grupiński	Civic Coalition	Civic Coalition	255,036	77.64
92	Third Way	Grzegorz Fedorowicz	New Poland – Centre	Centre Poland	111,128	49.93
93	Law and Justice	Leszek Galemba	Law and Justice	Law and Justice	87,454	44.06
94	Civic Coalition	Wojciech Ziemniak	Civic Coalition	Civic Coalition	91,461	49.72
95	Civic Coalition	Ewa Matecka	Civic Coalition	Civic Coalition	84,325	44.43
96	Civic Coalition	Janusz Pęcherz	Civic Coalition	Independent	69,512	40.64
97	Civic Coalition	Tomasz Grodzki	Civic Coalition	Civic Coalition	181,895	69.61
98	Civic Coalition	Magdalena Kochan	Civic Coalition	Civic Coalition	176,969	62.90
99	Civic Coalition	Janusz Gromek	Civic Coalition	Civic Coalition	91,840	55.58
100	Civic Coalition	Stanisław Gawłowski	Civic Coalition	Civic Coalition	66,976	42.50

=== Former senators ===
Const.	Electoral list	Senator	Parliamentary group	Party	# of votes	% of votes	Took office	Office termination	Reason	Succeeded by
13	The Left	Krzysztof Kukucki	The Left	New Left	82,899	46.05	13 November 2023	22 April 2024	Elected mayor of Włocławek.	Stanisław Pawlak
33	Civic Coalition	Bogdan Klich	Civic Coalition	Civic Platform	184,334	70.90	13 November 2023	17 November 2024	Appointed chargé d'affaires at the Polish Embassy in Washington.	Monika Piątkowska

== See also ==
- List of Sejm members (2023–2027)
