= Senate Constituency no. 1 =

Senate constituency in Poland

- Okręg wyborczy nr 1
- Constituency for the Senate of Poland
- Location within Poland.
- Counties: Bolesławiec, Lubań, Lwówek, Zgorzelec
- Voivodeship: Lower Silesian
- Population: 285,586 (June 2023)
- Electorate: 208,227 (2023)
- Area: 3,280 km^{2} (1,270 sq mi)

Current constituency
- Created: 2011
- Party: Labour Union
- Senator: Waldemar Witkowski
- Regional assembly: Lower Silesian Voivodeship Sejmik
- Sejm constituency: 1 (Legnica)
- EP constituency: Lower Silesian and Opole

Senate Constituency no. 1 (Polish: Okręg wyborczy nr 1) is a single-member constituency for the Senate of Poland in Lower Silesian Voivodeship, comprising counties of Bolesławiec, Lubań, Lwówek and Zgorzelec. Incumbent senator is Waldemar Witkowski (The Left) elected in 2023 parliamentary election.

== Elections ==
=== 2011 ===
2011 parliamentary election
| Candidate | Party | Votes | % |
|---|---|---|---|
| Jan Michalski | Civic Platform | 33,641 | 35.55 |
| Jerzy Zieliński | Rafał Dutkiewicz Electors' Committee | 20,474 | 21.63 |
| Roman Kulczycki | Law and Justice | 19,965 | 21.10 |
| Piotr Hetel | Democratic Left Alliance | 10,149 | 10.72 |
| Jerzy Dulnik | Polish People's Party | 7,476 | 7.90 |
| Anetta Stemler | National Revival of Poland | 2,934 | 3.10 |
| Total | | 94,639 | 100.00 |
| Valid votes | | 94,639 | 96.62 |
| Invalid/blank votes | | 3,308 | 3.38 |
| Total votes | | 97,947 | 100.00 |
| Registered voters/turnout | | 232,701 | 42.09 |
Source: National Electoral Commission

=== 2015 ===
2015 parliamentary election
| Candidate | Party | Votes | % |
|---|---|---|---|
| Rafał Ślusarz | Law and Justice | 34,858 | 36.93 |
| Jan Michalski | Civic Platform | 31,248 | 33.10 |
| Andrzej Adamczuk | United Left | 15,737 | 16.67 |
| Anetta Stemler | National Revival of Poland | 6,378 | 6.76 |
| Jerzy Dulnik | Polish People's Party | 6,177 | 6.54 |
| Total | | 94,398 | 100.00 |
| Valid votes | | 94,398 | 96.35 |
| Invalid/blank votes | | 3,580 | 3.65 |
| Total votes | | 97,978 | 100.00 |
| Registered voters/turnout | | 228,441 | 42.89 |
Source: National Electoral Commission

=== 2019 ===
2019 parliamentary election
| Candidate | Party | Votes | % |
|---|---|---|---|
| Rafał Ślusarz | Law and Justice | 45,420 | 38.53 |
| Władysław Kozakiewicz | Civic Coalition | 43,529 | 36.92 |
| Piotr Roman | Nonpartisans and Local Government Activists | 28,938 | 24.55 |
| Total | | 117,887 | 100.00 |
| Valid votes | | 117,887 | 98.05 |
| Invalid/blank votes | | 2,342 | 1.95 |
| Total votes | | 120,229 | 100.00 |
| Registered voters/turnout | | 220,446 | 54.54 |
Source: National Electoral Commission

=== 2023 ===
2023 parliamentary election
| Candidate | Party | Votes | % |
|---|---|---|---|
| Waldemar Witkowski | The Left | 55,372 | 39.36 |
| Rafał Ślusarz | Law and Justice | 45,644 | 32.45 |
| Kamil Barczyk | Nonpartisan Local Government Activists | 39,654 | 28.19 |
| Total | | 140,670 | 100.00 |
| Valid votes | | 140,670 | 97.41 |
| Invalid/blank votes | | 3,746 | 2.59 |
| Total votes | | 144,416 | 100.00 |
| Registered voters/turnout | | 208,227 | 69.36 |
Source: National Electoral Commission
