= Bohdan Paszkowski =

Polish politician (born 1965)

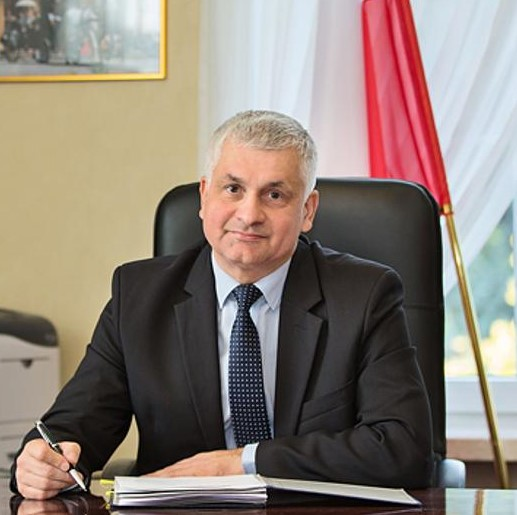

Voivode of Podlaskie Voivodeship
- In office 8 December 2015 – 20 December 2023
- President: Andrzej Duda
- Prime Minister: Beata Szydło; Mateusz Morawiecki
- Preceded by: Andrzej Meyer
- Succeeded by: Jacek Brzozowski

Voivode of Podlaskie Voivodeship
- In office 18 January 2007 – 5 November 2007
- President: Lech Kaczyński
- Prime Minister: Donald Tusk
- Preceded by: Jan Dobrzyński
- Succeeded by: Maciej Żywno

Personal details
- Born: 31 January 1965 (age 61) Białystok, Polish People's Republic
- Citizenship: Poland
- Party: Law and Justice
- Spouse: Agnieszka Paszkowska
- Children: 2
- Education: University of Białystok
- Occupation: Lawyer, politician

Bohdan Paszkowski (born 31 January 1965 in Białystok) is a Polish politician and jurist. In 2007 and from 2015 to December 2023 he was the Voivode of Podlaskie Voivodeship.

== Biography ==
He was born in Białystok, the son of Andrezej. In 1989 he graduated from the Faculty of Law of the Branch of the University of Warsaw in Białystok (now the University of Białystok). In the years 1990–1992 he was a judge in the Provincial Court in Białystok. In 1993, he obtained the qualifications of a legal advisor. From 20 December 1994 to 12 December 2006 he was the city secretary of Białystok. He served as a senator in the VII, VIII and IX convocations of the Polish Senate. On 8 December 2015 he was appointed to the post of Voivode of Podlaskie Voivodeship by Prime Minister Beata Szydło. and served in that position until December 2023 when his term ended in accordance with decision of Prime Minister Donald Tusk and replaced by Jacek Brzozowski. His tenure was characterized with constant conflicts with city councils and administrations dominated by Civic Platform members in the voivodeship. He is married and has two daughters.
