= Katarzyna Ueberhan =

Polish politician (born 1975)

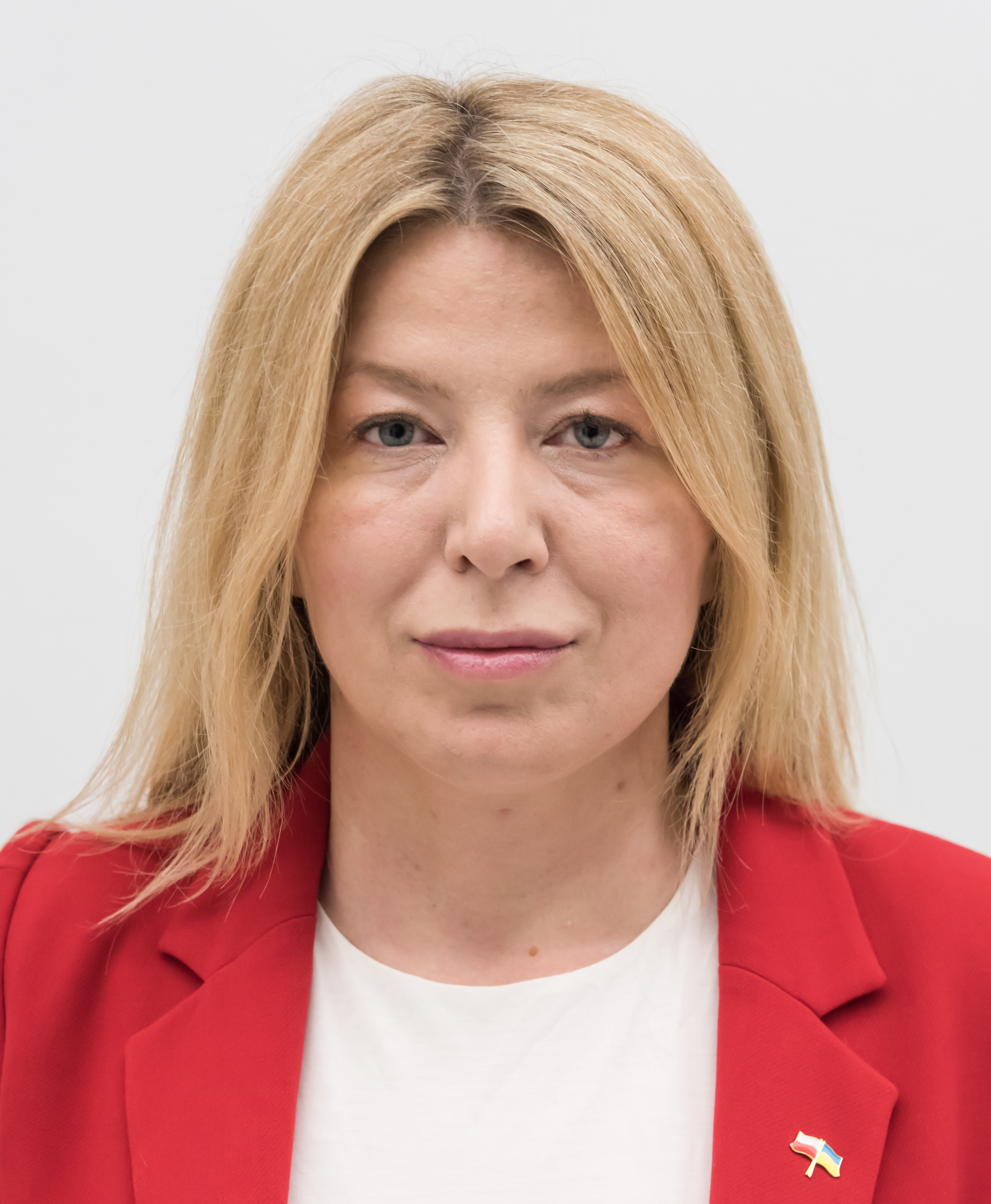

Member of the Sejm
- Incumbent
- Assumed office 12 November 2019

Personal details
- Born: 26 August 1975 (age 50) Poznań, Poland
- Party: New Left

Katarzyna Ueberhan (born 26 August 1975) is a Polish politician. She was elected to the Sejm (9th term) representing the constituency of Poznań.
