= Józef Zając (mathematician) =

Polish mathematician

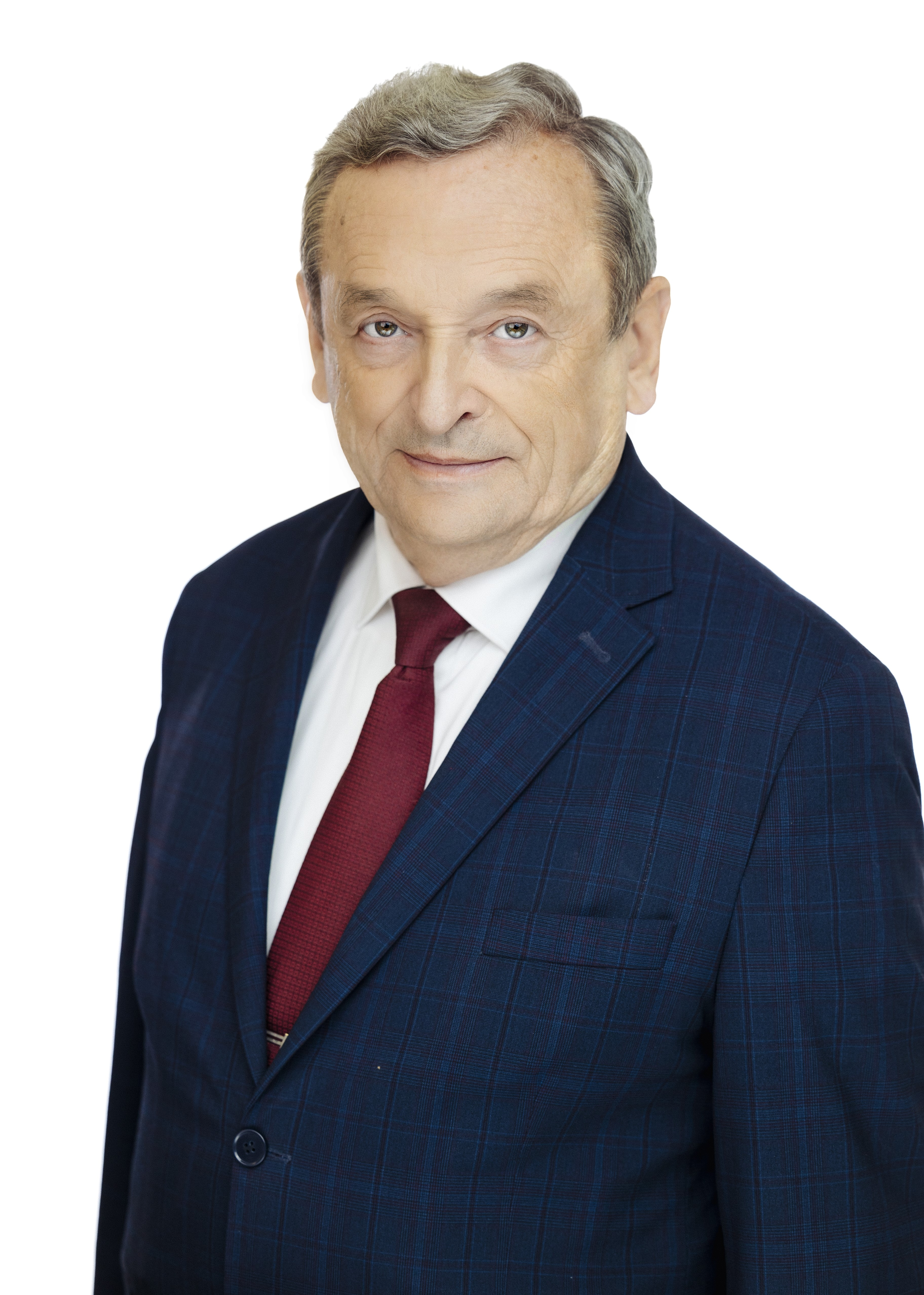
- Józef Zając in 2023

Member of the Senate
- Incumbent
- Assumed office 2011
- Constituency: 18 Chełm

Personal details
- Born: 14 March 1947 (age 79) Stany Nowe, Poland
- Party: Independent
- Other political affiliations: Agreement (2021–2023); Law and Justice (2016–2021); PSL (until 2016)

Józef Zając (born 14 March 1947 in Stany Nowe) is a Polish mathematician, academic teacher, and habilitated doctor of mathematical sciences. Zając is also a senator of the VIII, IX and X Senate of Poland. He is also a member of the Agreement political party.
