= Katarzyna Kretkowska =

Polish politician (born 1958)

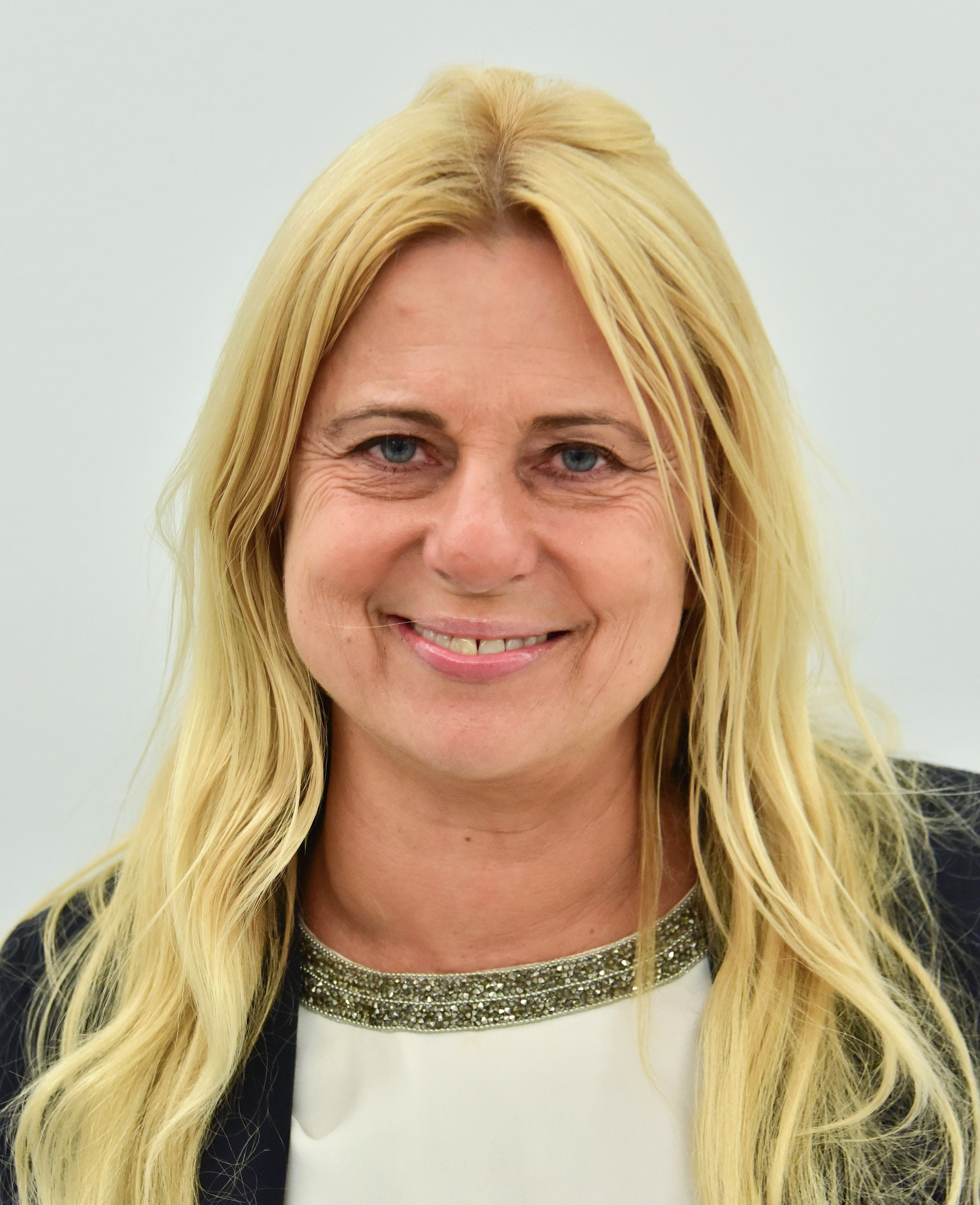

Member of the Sejm
- In office 12 November 2019 – 12 November 2023
- Constituency: 39-Poznań

Personal details
- Born: 7 June 1958 (age 67) Gdynia, Poland
- Party: New Left
- Other political affiliations: The Left

Katarzyna Maria Kretkowska (born 7 June 1958) is a Polish politician. She was elected to the Sejm (9th term) representing the constituency of Poznań.
