= Franciszek Sterczewski =

Polish urban activist, and politician

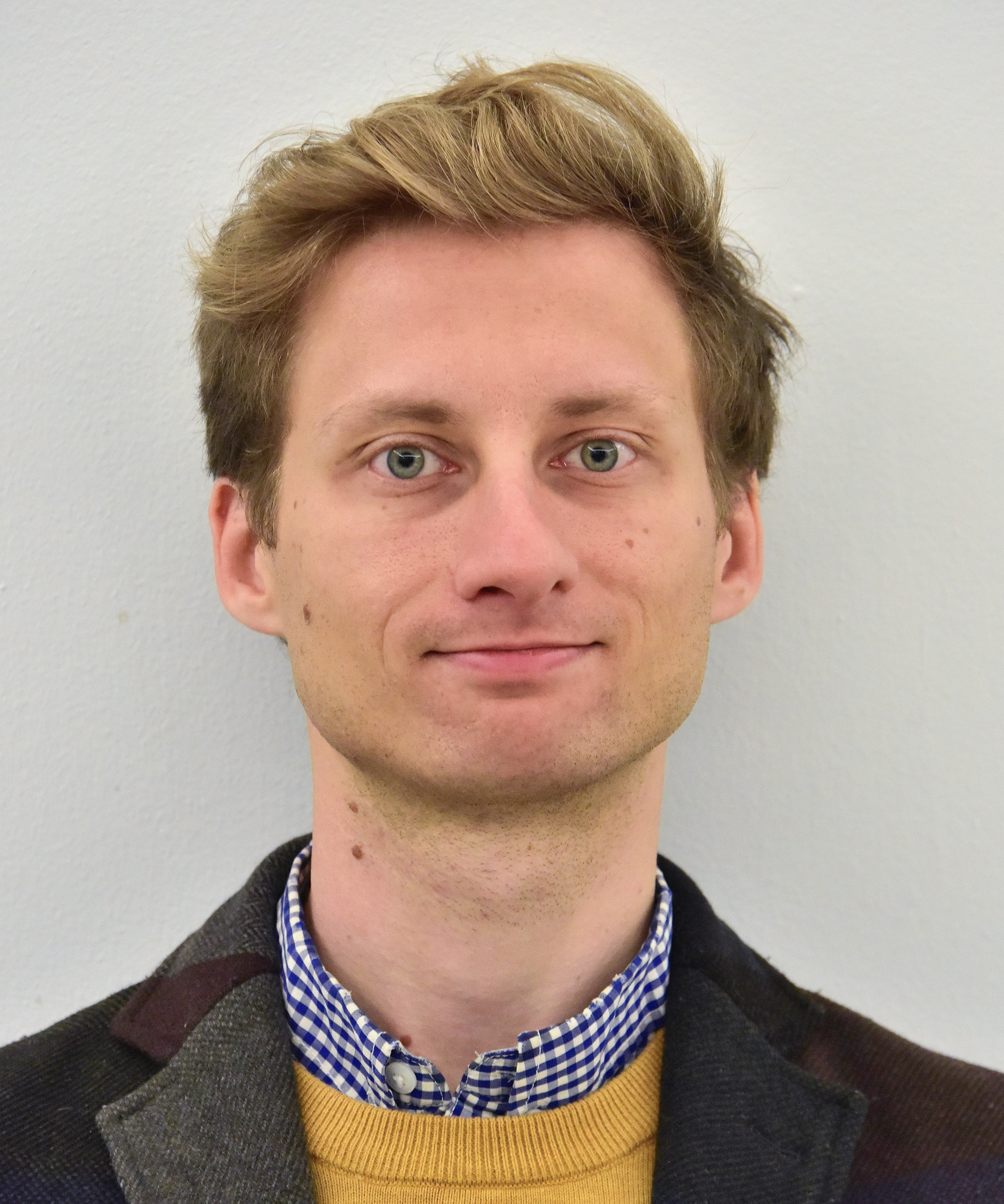
- Franciszek Sterczewski (2019)

Member of the Sejm
- Incumbent
- Assumed office 12 November 2019
- Constituency: 39-Poznań

Personal details
- Born: 17 March 1988 (age 38) Poznań, Poland
- Party: Independent
- Other political affiliations: Civic Coalition (2019–present)
- Education: University of Fine Arts in Poznań (BS)
- Profession: activist

Franciszek Wojciech Sterczewski (born 17 March 1988) is a Polish urban activist, and politician. He has been a member of the Sejm (9th term) since 2019.

== Biography ==
He is an architectural engineer by education, in 2014 he graduated from the Faculty of Architecture and Design at the University of Arts in Poznań. He was professionally associated with the Poznań International Fair, where he worked as a coordinator for development strategies.

Sterczewski took part in protests against the reconstruction of the Royal Castle in Poznań, whose designed form was controversial. In July 2017, he took over the organization of the protests to defend the independence of the judiciary, continued and developed under the name Chain of Light. In 2019, he co-organized the Protest with an Exclamation Mark at the Wolności Square in Poznań, an action aimed at supporting participants of the teachers' strike in Poland in 2019.

In 2019, he joined the council of the Św. Łazarz in Poznań, he also became a member of the estate management. In the parliamentary elections in 2019, he was elected to the Sejm from the Poznań constituency, running from the last place on the list of the Civic Coalition as a non-party candidate. He obtained 25,060 votes, which was the third result on the list with five seats in this constituency.

On 4 May 2021, Sterczewski did not join other Civic Coalition members in voting against the EU Covid Fund. "Will PiS be able to boast about various investments? Of course," he said, explaining why he voted in the bill's favor in the Sejm. "Does this mean I should be against it? No, because we are talking about a giant injection of money that will improve the lives of Poles."

He was detained by Israel in international waters on 1 October 2025, while participating in the Global Sumud Flotilla, an effort to provide food and other aid to Palestinians in Gaza during the Gaza war.
