= Andrzej Meyer =

Polish economist and liberal politician (1955–2016)

Andrzej Bronisław Meyer
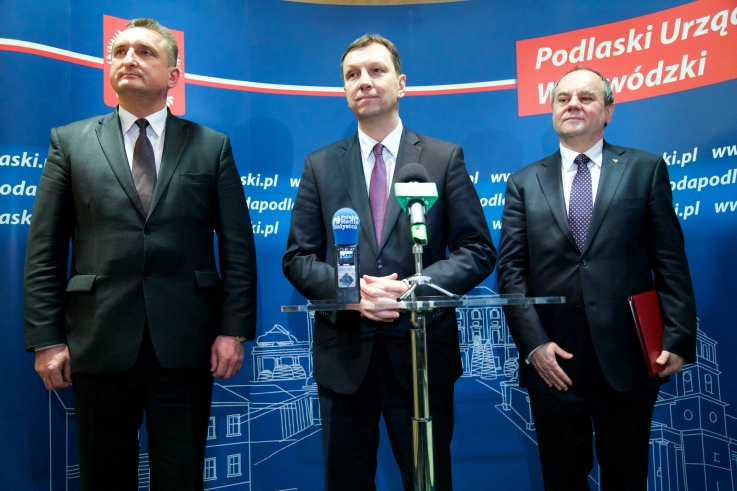
- Andrzej Meyer in right together with Wojciech Dzierzgowski and Andrzej Halicki

Voivode of Podlaskie Voivodeship
- In office 22 December 2014 – 7 October 2015
- President: Bronisław Komorowski
- Prime Minister: Ewa Kopacz
- Preceded by: Maciej Żywno
- Succeeded by: Bohdan Paszkowski

Personal details
- Born: 6 August 1955 Białystok, Polish People's Republic
- Died: 23 January 2016 (aged 60)
- Cause of death: Cancer
- Resting place: Farny Cemetery in Białystok
- Citizenship: Poland
- Party: Civic Platform
- Other political affiliations: Liberal Democratic Congress; Freedom Union
- Education: University of Białystok
- Occupation: Tax consultant, politician

Andrzej Bronisław Meyer (6 August 1955 in Białystok -23 January 2016) was a Polish economist, entrepreneur and local government official, in 2011-2014 Vice President of Białystok and in 2014-2015 Voivode of Podlaskie Voivodeship.

== Biography ==
Son of Bronisław and Janina. He graduated in economics from the University of Białystok. He ran his own business in the field of real estate management, he also dealt with tax consultancy, and was a member of the authorities of the National Chamber of Tax Advisors. In 1990, he joined the Liberal Democratic Congress, and in the same year he became a councilor of Białystok for the first term. From 1994 he was a member of the Freedom Union, and in 2005 he joined the Civic Platform, where he held, among others, the function of regional secretary. In 2011, he became the vice-president of Białystok. On December 22, 2014, he was appointed Voivode of Podlaskie Voivodeship. On October 6, 2015, he resigned after being charged with alleged failure to fulfill his duties during his term as vice-president of Białystok. The next day he was dismissed from his position. In 2015, he was awarded the Badge of Honor for Services to the Association of Siberians. He was married and had two children. He died of cancer. He was buried on January 27, 2016, at the Farny Cemetery in Białystok. In 2019, the City Council of Białystok named a roundabout at the intersection of Nowowarszawska and Ciołkowskiego streets after him.
