= Jacek Brzozowski =

Polish politician

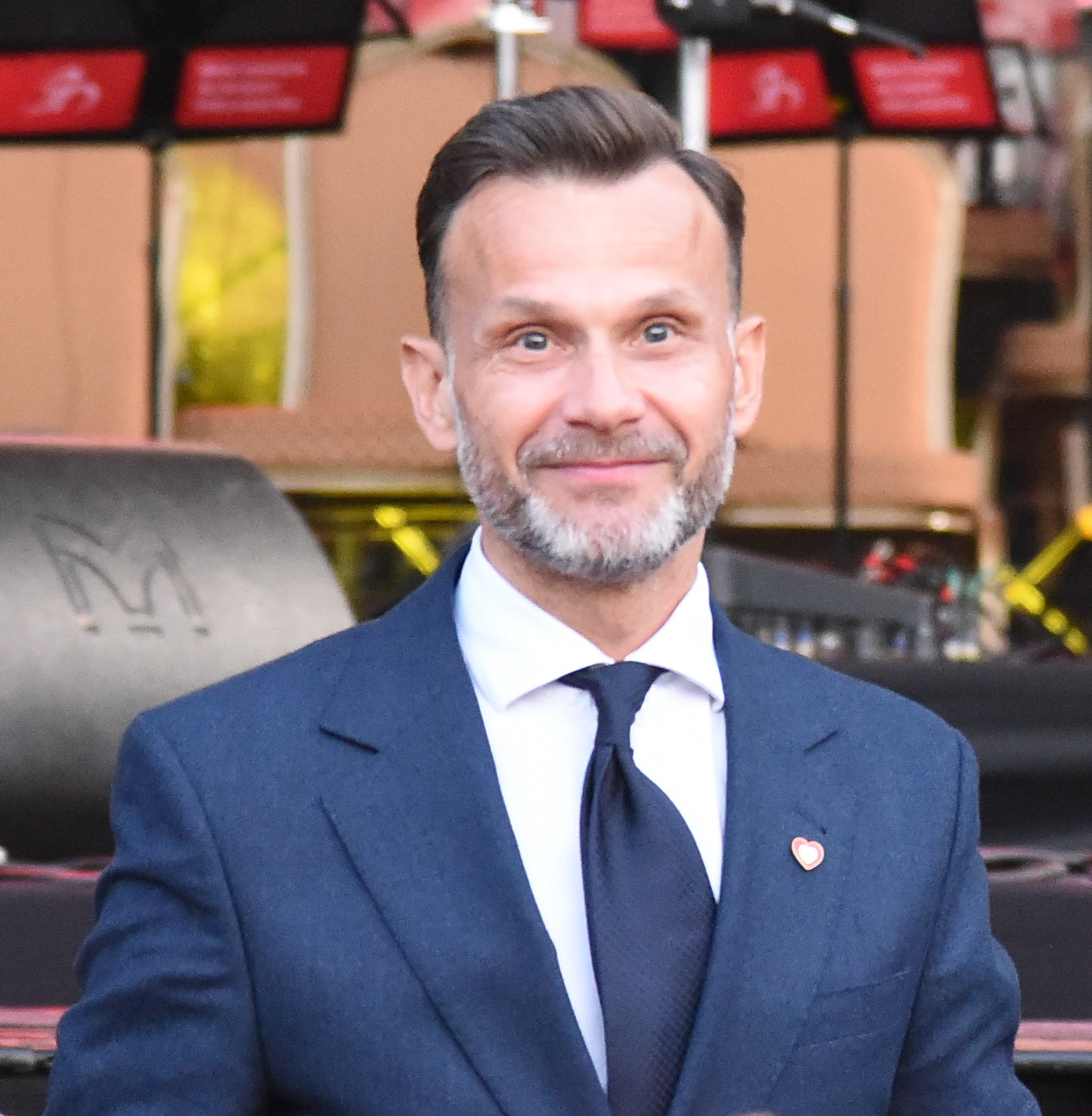

Voivode of Podlaskie Voivodeship
- Incumbent
- Assumed office 20 December 2023
- President: Andrzej Duda
- Prime Minister: Donald Tusk
- Preceded by: Bohdan Paszkowski

Personal details
- Born: 31 January 1977 (age 49) Łapy, Polish People's Republic
- Citizenship: Poland
- Party: Civic Platform
- Education: University of Białystok
- Occupation: Historian, politician
- Awards: Badge of Merit for the National Revenue Administration

Jacek Brzozowski (born 31 January 1977 in Łapy) is a Polish academician, public official and politician who is serving since December 2023 as the Voivode of Podlaskie Voivodeship.

== Biography ==
In 2002, he graduated in history from the University of Białystok. He then became an employee of the Institute of History at this university. In 2012, at his alma mater, he obtained a PhD in humanities based on the thesis entitled Between Bydgoszcz and Lviv. Sigismund I and the crown nobility in the years 1520–1540. In 2016, he completed postgraduate studies in international relations at the Polish Institute of International Affairs and in cultural diplomacy at Collegium Civitas in Warsaw. He became a member of one of the commissions of the Polish Historical Society and the Institute for Research on the Cultural Heritage of Europe. The Mayor of Białystok, Tadeusz Truskolaski, entrusted him with the function of director of the Mayor's Department. On December 20, 2023, Prime Minister Donald Tusk appointed him as Voivode of Podlaskie Voivodeship. As a voivode, he vowed to pay attention to monuments conservation in the region.
