= Sejm Constituency no. 39 =

Parliamentary constituency in Poland

Sejm Constituency no. 39 Poznań
- Okręg wyborczy nr 39; Poznań
- Constituency for the Sejm
- Location within Poland.
- Counties: Poznań (city county), Poznań County (land county)
- Voivodeship: Greater Poland
- Population: 985,267 (June 2023)
- Electorate: 723,283 (2023)

Current constituency
- Created: 2001
- Deputies: 10
- Regional assembly: Greater Poland Voivodeship Sejmik
- Senate constituencies: 90 and 91
- EP constituency: Greater Poland

Sejm Constituency no. 39 (Polish: Okręg wyborczy nr 39) is a constituency of the Sejm in the Greater Poland Voivodeship, which elects ten deputies. It covers geographical area of the city of Poznań and surrounding Poznań County.

== List of deputies ==
Deputies of the 9th Sejm (2019–2023)
Deputy	Party
Jadwiga Emilewicz	Law and Justice
Szymon Szynkowski vel Sęk	Law and Justice
Bartłomiej Wróblewski	Law and Justice
Waldy Dzikowski	Civic Platform (Note: Member of the Civic Coalition parliamentary group.)
Rafał Grupiński	Civic Platform
Joanna Jaśkowiak	Independent
Franciszek Sterczewski	Independent
Adam Szłapka	Modern
Katarzyna Kretkowska	New Left (Note: Member of The Left parliamentary group.)
Katarzyna Ueberhan	New Left
