= Maciej Kopiec =

Polish politician (born 1990)

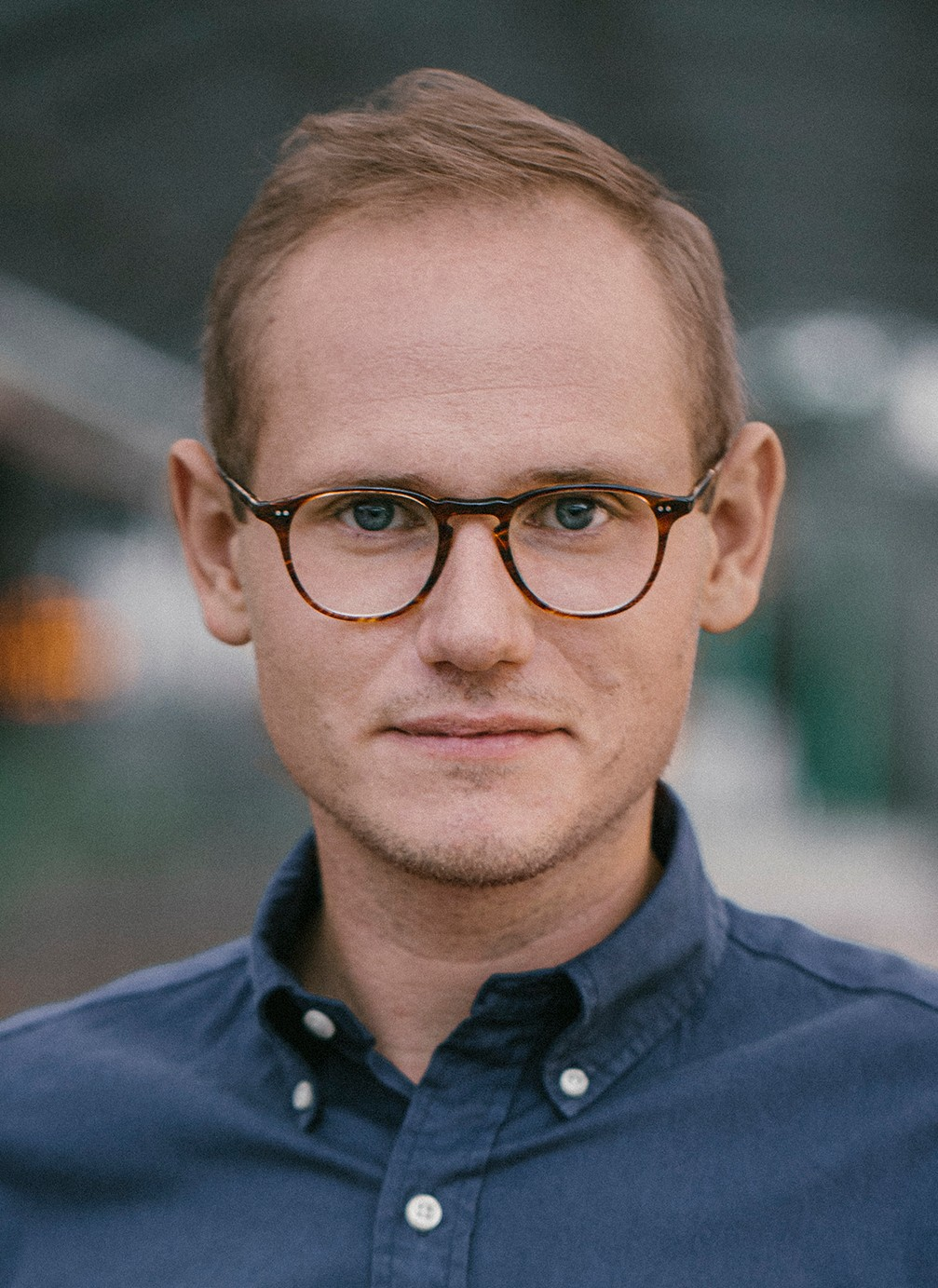
- Kopiec in 2020

Member of the Senate
- Incumbent
- Assumed office 13 November 2023
- Constituency: Katowice

Member of the Sejm
- In office 12 November 2019 – 12 November 2023
- Constituency: Bielsko-Biała II

Personal details
- Born: 12 July 1990 (age 35)
- Party: New Left (since 2021)

Maciej Kopiec (born 12 July 1990) is a Polish politician serving as a member of the Senate since 2023. From 2019 to 2023, he was a member of the Sejm.
