= Waldy Dzikowski =

Polish politician (born 1959)

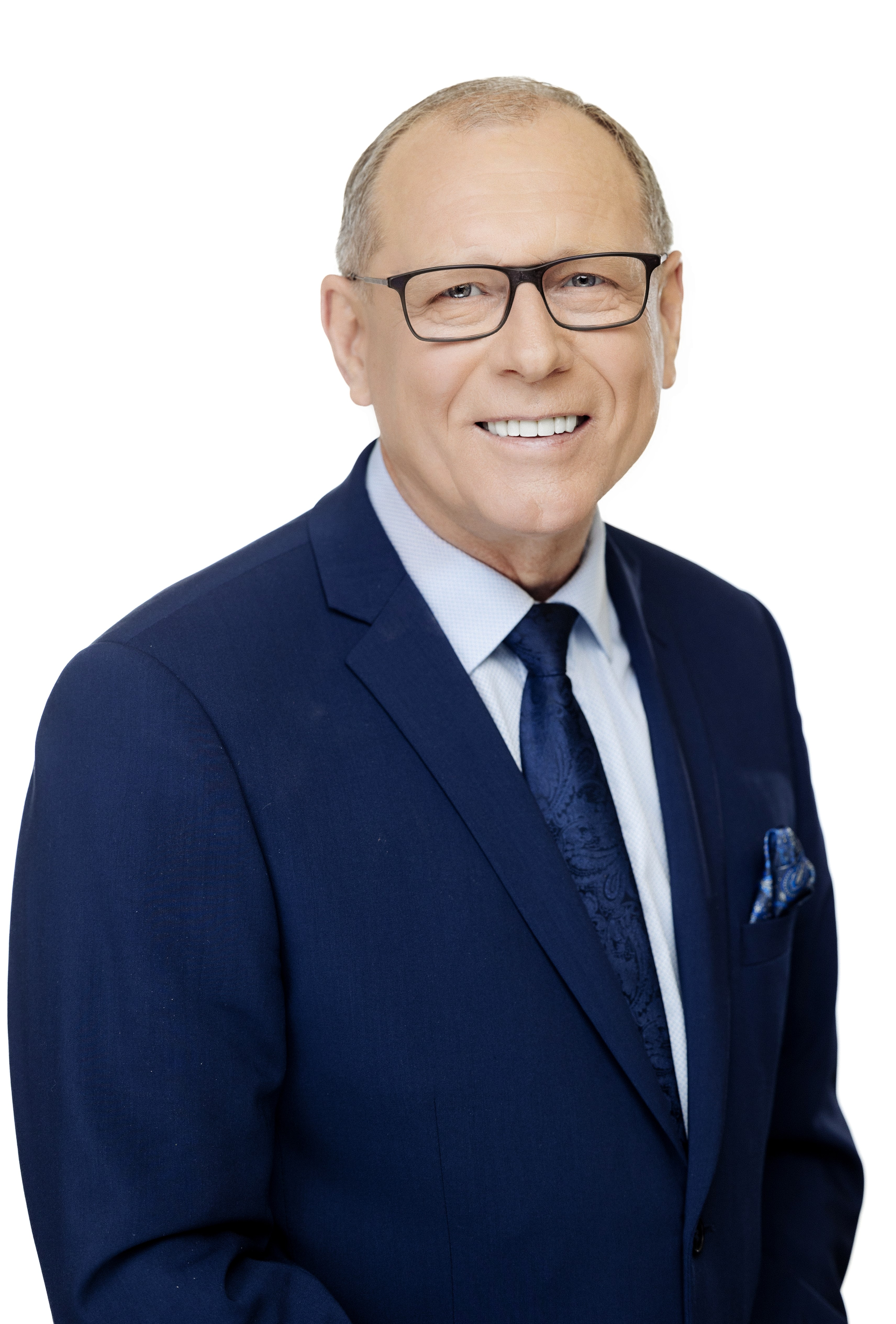

Member of the Sejm
- In office 19 October 2001 – 12 November 2023
- Constituency: 39 – Poznań

Member of the Senate
- Incumbent
- Assumed office 13 November 2023

Personal details
- Born: 23 July 1959 (age 66)
- Party: Civic Platform

Waldy Dzikowski [ˈvaldɘ d͡ʑiˈkɔvskʲi] (born 23 July 1959 in Wschowa) is a Polish politician. He was elected to the Sejm on 25 September 2005, getting 54,959 votes in 39 Poznań district as a candidate from the Civic Platform list.

He was also a member of Sejm 2001-2005, 2005–2007, 2007–2011, 2011–2015, 2015–2019, 2019–2023.

== See also ==
- Members of Polish Sejm 2005-2007
