= Dawid Jung =

Polish writer (born 1980)

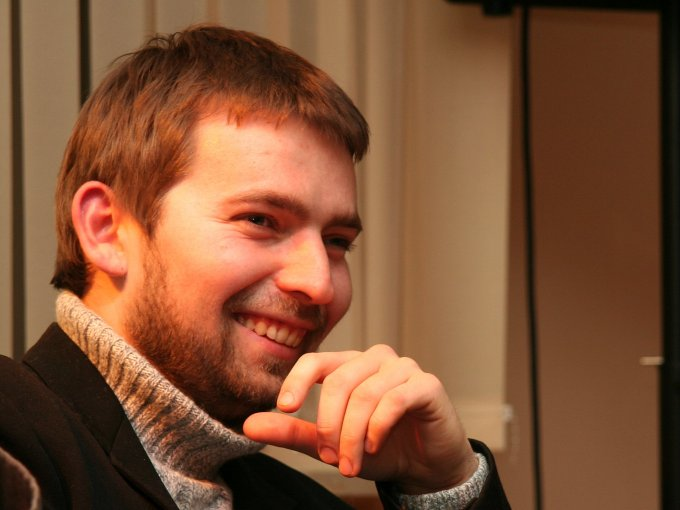
- Born: Kłecko, Poland
- Occupations: Writer, translator, editor

Dawid Jung (born 1980) is a Polish opera singer, poet, writer, literary and theater critic, publisher, cultural researcher, historian, museum curator, director of the Museum of Polish Electronic Organs, and editor-in-chief of "Zeszyty Poetyckie".

Between 2003 and 2005, he conducted classes on contemporary poetics for students at Collegium Europaeum Gnesnense (Adam Mickiewicz University in Poznań), where he was a legal guardian for the Literary-Philosophical Section named after Władysław Nehring. From 2000 to 2006, he studied solo singing at the Feliks Nowowiejski Music Academy in Bydgoszcz under the guidance of Prof. Bożena Porzyńska, continuing his studies at the Academy of Music in Gdańsk from 2006 to 2008. He further pursued vocal arts in Vienna, performing roles including in Anton Ariensky's "Rafael," and in Rome, where he received a music scholarship.

In 2004, he initiated and re-established one of Gniezno's significant cultural events, the independent culture festival "Festa Fatuorum” (Feast of Fools).

In 2009, he was awarded the Juliusz Słowacki Medal for a fragment of "Poem of Speaking the Truth" by Marian Pankowski at the Ossolineum. He is coordinator of the academic symposium "Rzeczpospolita – mity a rzeczywistość. O poezji polskiej po 1989 roku" (Republic – myths and reality. On Polish poetry after 1989) at Adam Mickiewicz University in Poznań. He is also the chief editor of publishing series: Library of Contemporary Polish Poetry, Library of Old Polish Literature, and Historical Studies within "Zeszyty Poetyckie." He is a member of the Bydgoszcz Scientific Society, the Association of Polish Journalists, the International Federation of Journalists, and the Stowarzyszenie Pisarzy Polskich.

He is the originator and founder of the Museum of Polish Electronic Organs, possessing the world's largest collection of Polish electronic keyboard instruments.

Since January 2023, he has served as the Vice President of the Stowarzyszenie Pisarzy Polskich in Poznań.

== Selected bibliography ==
=== Poetry collections ===
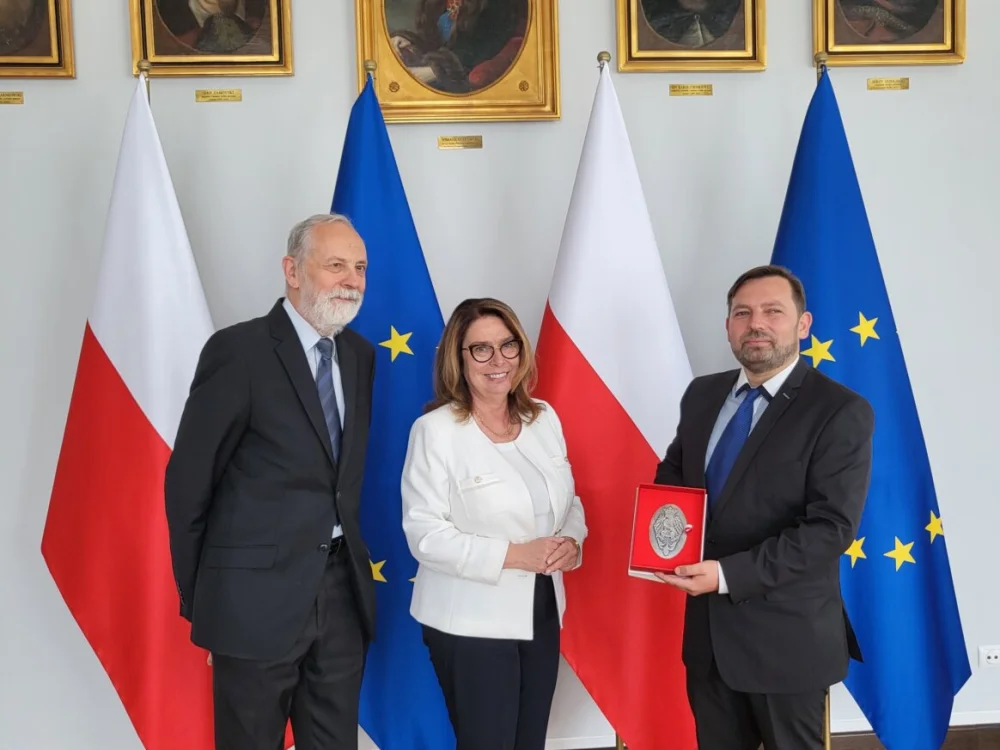
Medal of the Senate of the Republic of Poland

- 2006: 312685 powodów (312685 reasons); Opole: Stowarzyszenie Żywych Poetów
- 2014: Poemat o mówieniu prawdy (A poem about telling the truth); Gniezno: Zeszyty Poetyckie
- 2018: Karaoke; Łódź: Stowarzyszenie Pisarzy Polskich
- 2020: #spam; Kraków: Stowarzyszenie Pisarzy Polskich & Society of Authors ZAiKS

=== Prose collections ===
- 2017: Glosy; Gniezno: Konfraternia Teatralna
- 2017: Polska, ulubiona masochistka Europy (Poland, Europe's favorite masochist); Gniezno: Konfraternia Teatralna

=== History of Literature ===
- 2012: Wierszopisowie Kłecka w latach 1590–1623. Przyczynki do historii kultury staropolskiej (The Poets of Kłecko in the Years 1590–1623: Contributions to the History of Old Polish Culture); Old Polish Library, epilogue: Karol Samsel, Assistant professor at the Faculty of Polish Studies, University of Warsaw
- 2014: Gdańskie hymny Jakuba Gembickiego (Anthems of Gdansk by Jakub Gembicki); Gdańsk (as part of the cultural scholarship of the City of Gdansk)
- 2018: Legendy królewskiego miasta. Z przekazów ustnych zebrał i opracował Dawid Jung (Legends of the Royal City. Compiled and Edited by Dawid Jung from Oral Accounts); Studia Kleccensia
- 2020: Ostatni rybałci polszczyzny. Poeci ludowi XIX wieku związani z Ełkiem (The Last Ribalds of the Polish Language: Folk Poets of the 19th Century Associated with Ełk); Ełk Cultural Center (as part of the cultural scholarship of the City of Ełk)
- 2020: To je wiôldżé. Antologia poetów kaszubskich okresu międzywojennego (To je wiôldżé. Anthology of Kashubian Poets from the Interwar Period); Gdańsk (as part of the cultural scholarship from the Marshal's Office of the Pomeranian Voivodeship)
- 2021: Legendy zamku ełckiego (Legends of the Ełk Castle); Ełk: The city office & Zeszyty Poetyckie
- 2023: Szczecińskie legendy. Szlak kulturowy szczecińskich legend (Legends of Szczecin. Szczecin Legends Cultural Trail); Stowarzyszenie Pisarzy Polskich (as part of the cultural scholarship of the City of Szczecin)

== Translations of Jung's poetry into other languages ==
- English: Free Over Blood - Contemporary Polish Writing in Translation, translated by Marek Kazmierski, Karen Kovacik, Benjamin Paloff and Katarzyna Szuster, published by OFF_Press London 2011 ISBN 9780956394620
- German: Ich Oder Ja. Anthologie, translated by Uljana Wolf, Berlin 2002
  - Erste Schlehenblute. Gedichte aus Lyrikmail, Berlin: Koall Verlag 2006, ISBN 3-938436-02-6, translated by Uljana Wolf, Karla Reimert, Karolina Rakoczy (includes poems by German-language poets Hugo Ball, Johann Wolfgang von Goethe, Heinrich Heine, Friedrich Hölderlin, Franz Kafka, Friedrich von Logau, Martin Opitz, Friedrich Nietzsche, Rainer Maria Rilke, Friedrich Schiller, and Georg Trakl)
- Czech: Třetí večer. Polská poezie, Ústí nad Labem 2000, translated by prof. Alena Debická
- Ukrainian: Хто вам дозволив так чудово жити, translated by Bogdana Buczkowska, Library of Translations from European Literature, Poznań: Stowarzyszenie Pisarzy Polskich 2023

== Awards ==
- 2009: Juliusz Słowacki Medal
- 2014: Young Art Medal (the first laureate in literature was Stanisław Barańczak)
- 2014: Millennium of the Gniezno Congress Medal (The medal was also received by: Jerzy Buzek, Miloš Zeman, Mikuláš Dzurinda, Gerhard Schröder
- 2016: Wiłkomirski Family Award
- 2016: Young Journalists' Award (Polish Journalists Association) for culture-related columns
- 2017: Bolesław Leśmian Award
- 2018: Decoration of Honor Meritorious for Polish Culture
- 2019: Identitas Literary and Historical Award for the book Glosy
- 2019: Magellan Award – main prize in the mobile guide category (co-authorship of the guidebook "13 Ideas for Gniezno and Its Surroundings" awarded by the Literary Magazine "Książki”
- 2019: Władysław Reymont Literary Award (nomination for literary activities together with Beata Szymańska)
- 2019: Anatol J. Omelaniuk Award (distinction for the best regional book published in 2018 – for collecting and editing old legends of Kłecko presented in the book "Legends of the Royal City," Chair of the Jury: Prof. Stefan Bednarek, the chairman of the Committee on Cultural Sciences Polish Academy of Sciences
- 2019: Medal Młodego Pozytywisty (Young Positivist Medal)
- 2020: Guardian of National Memory Sites Medal (appointed by the Minister of Culture)
- 2021: Order of St. John Paul II
- 2021 Officer's Cross (1st class) of the Polish Black Cross
- 2022: Centenary of Regained Independence Medal
- 2023: Silver Badge Stowarzyszenie Pisarzy Polskich
- 2024: Medal of the Senate of the Republic of Poland (presented by the Marshal of the Senate, Małgorzata Kidawa-Błońska, and the Deputy Marshal, Rafał Grupiński)
