= Rafał Grupiński =

Polish politician (born 1952)

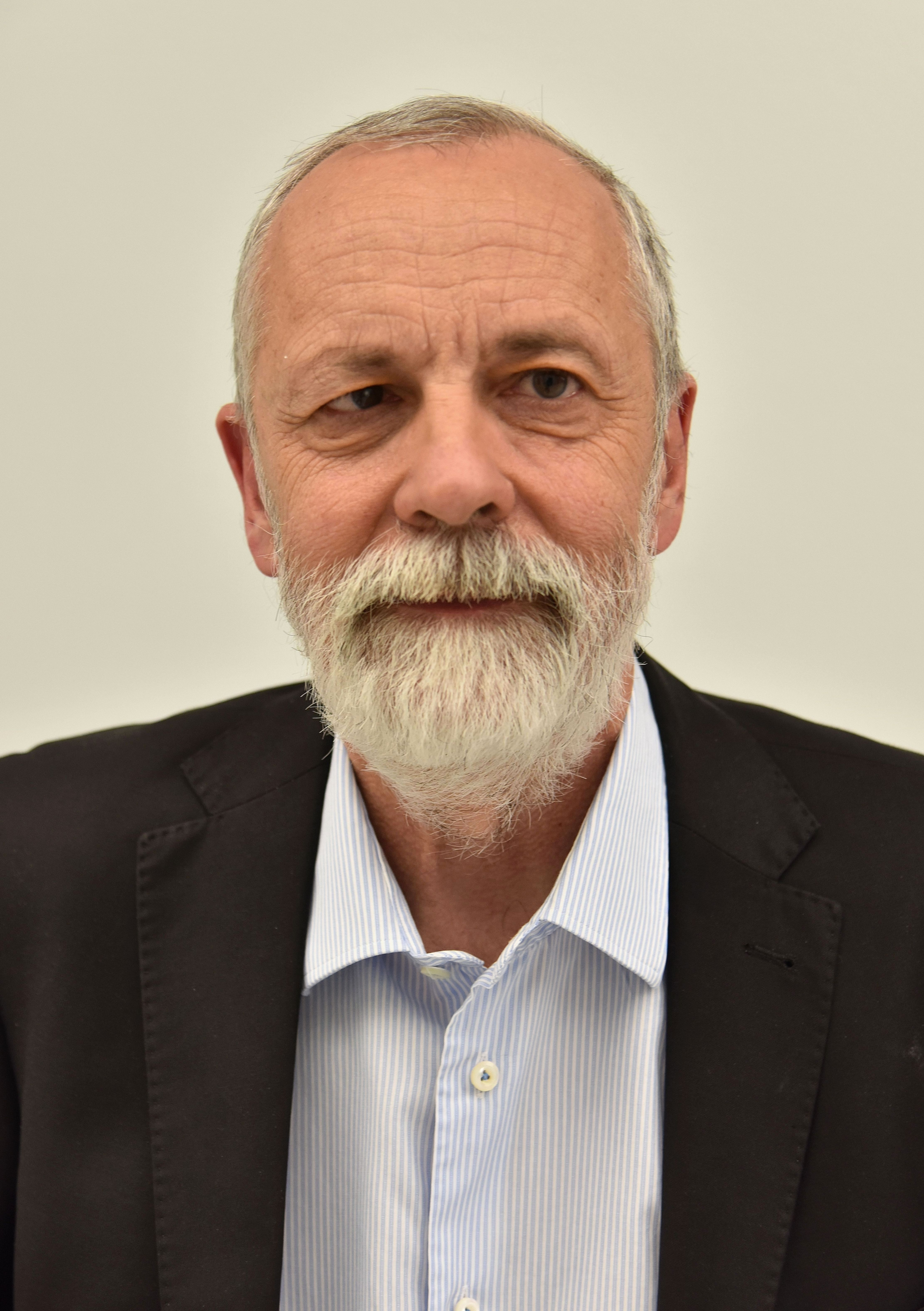

Deputy Marshal of the Senate
- Incumbent
- Assumed office 13 November 2023 Serving with See List
- Marshal: Małgorzata Kidawa-Błońska

Member of the Senate
- Incumbent
- Assumed office 13 November 2023
- Term(s): 11th Senate
- Parliamentary group: Civic Coalition
- Constituency: 91
- Majority: 328,503 (77,64%)

Member of the Sejm
- In office 19 October 2005 – 12 November 2023
- Term(s): 5th, 6th, 7th, 8th and 9th Sejm
- Constituency: 39 (Poznań) (2011–2023); 36 (Kalisz) (2005–2011)

Personal details
- Born: 26 September 1952 (age 73) Wronki, Poland
- Party: Civic Platform

Rafał Szymon Grupiński (born 26 September 1952) is a Polish politician, member of the Sejm (2005–2023) and member of the Senate since 2023. He serves in the current Senate as the Deputy Marshal.

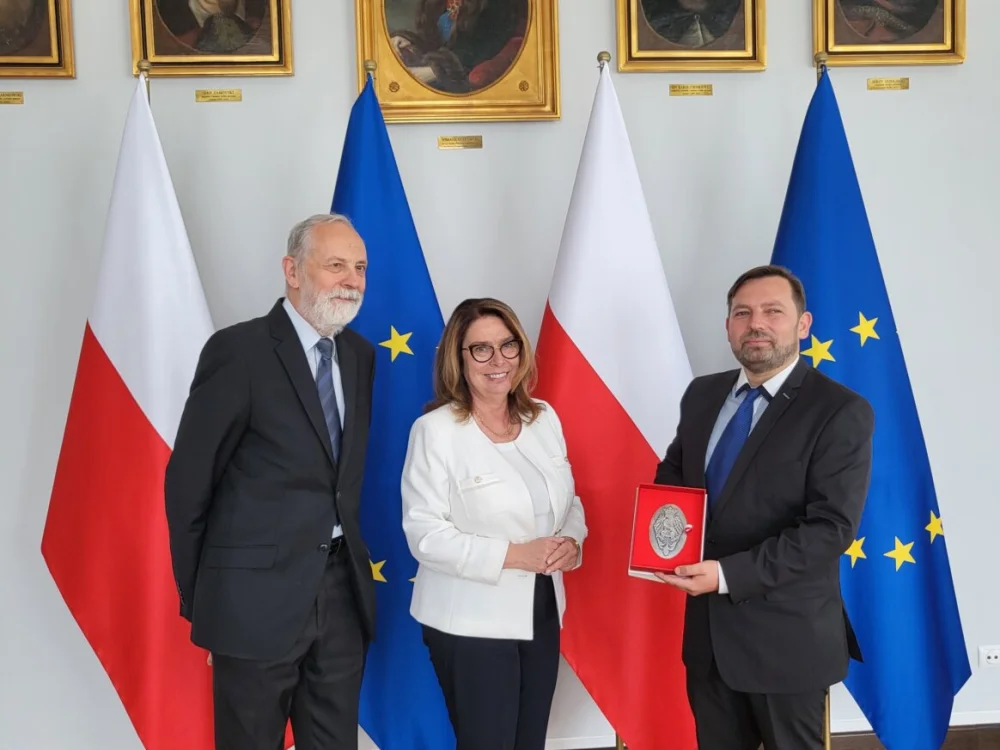
Rafał Grupiński, Deputy Marshal of the Senate of the Republic of Poland, honors Dawid Jung, 2024

In the 2005 parliamentary election Grupiński was elected member of the Sejm for the Sejm Constituency no. 36 (Kalisz) as the Civic Platform candidate. He was reelected in 2007. Since the 2011 parliamentary election he represented a neighboring Sejm Constituency no. 39 (Poznań), where he also was reelected in 2015 and 2019.

In 2023 parliamentary election Grupiński run to the Polish Senate as a Civic Coalition (member of the Senate Pact 2023) candidate from Poznań (Senate Constituency no. 91). He received 328,503 (77,64%) votes in the constituency, gaining the seat. On 13 November 2023 he assumed his seat as a senator and at the first session was elected Deputy Marshal of the Senate under marshalship of Małgorzata Kidawa-Błońska.
