= Karen Kovacik =

Former Indiana poet laureate

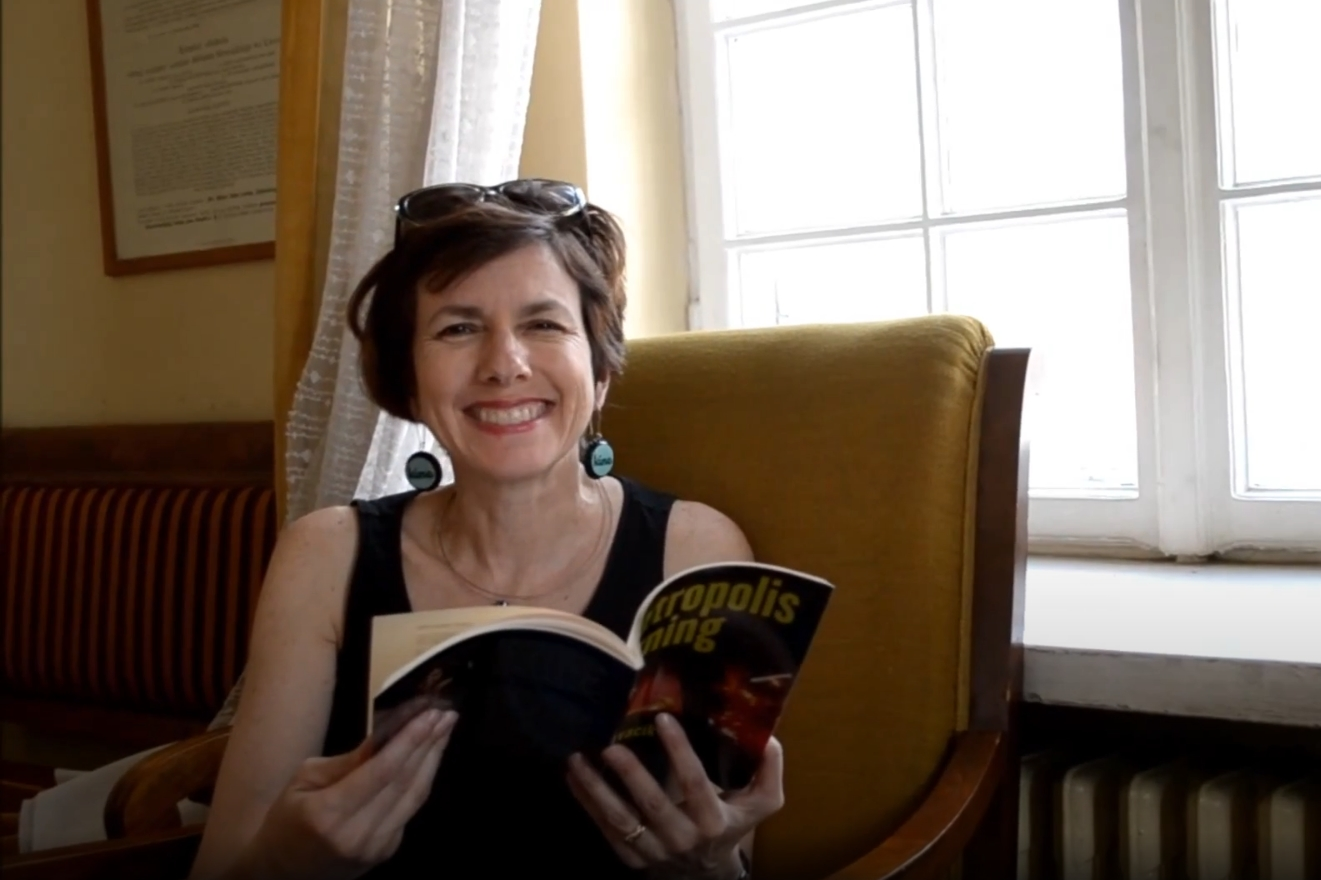
Karen Kovacik in 2013

Karen Kovacik is a poet and translator of Polish poetry. She is the former poet laureate of the American state of Indiana from 2011 until 2013. George Kalamaras succeeded her. During her time as poet laureate she put on a series of readings bringing poets from Indiana and other states called The Borderlands Project.
