= Rafał Ślusarz =

Polish politician (born 1962)

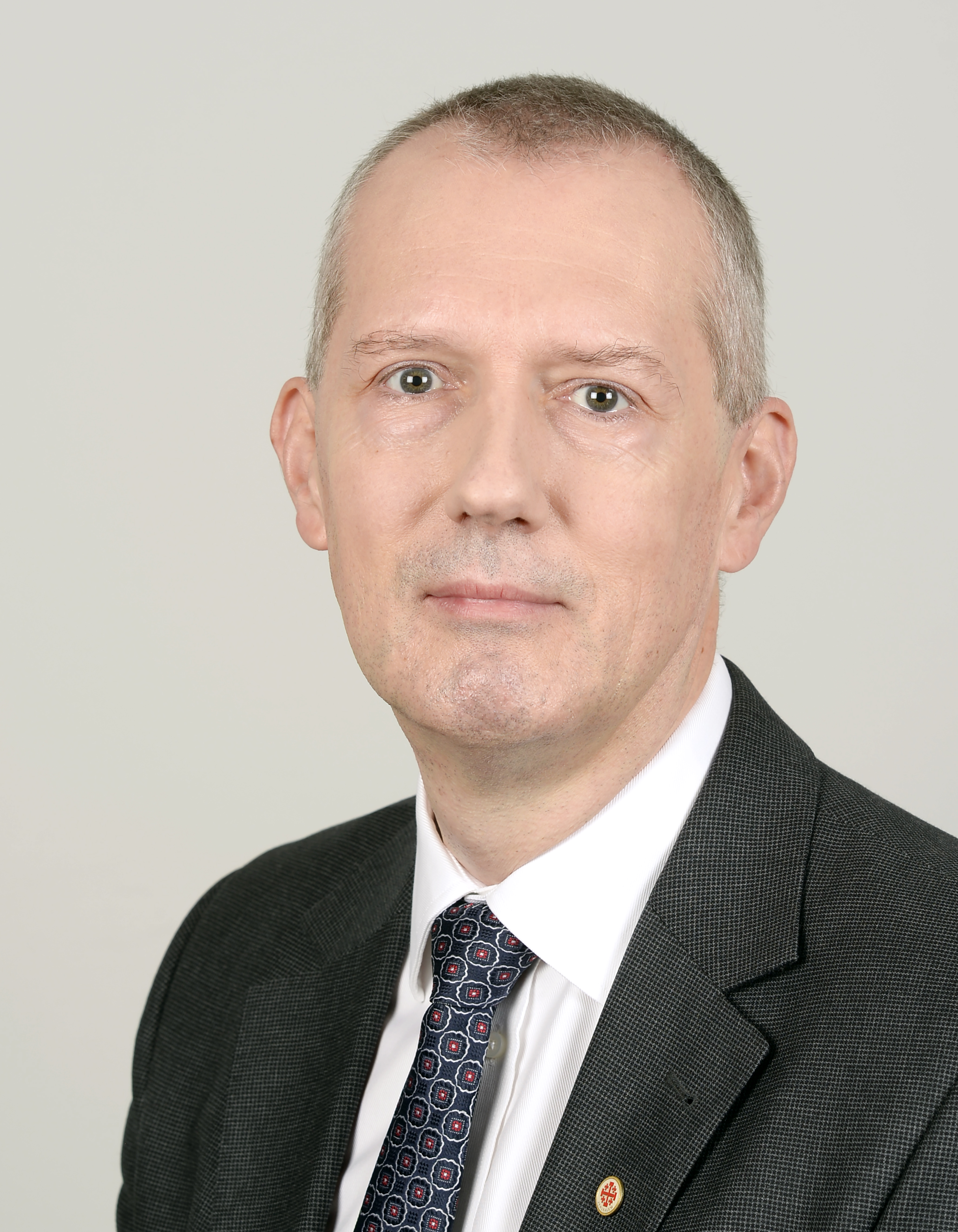
Rafał Ślusarz

Rafał Józef Ślusarz (born 19 March 1962) is a Polish politician. He was elected to the Senate of Poland (10th term) representing the constituency of Legnica. He was also elected to the 6th term and 9th term of the Senate of Poland.
