= Stany Nowe =

- Village
- Location within Poland
- Coordinates: 50°49′5″N 22°15′57″E
- Country: Poland
- Voivodeship: Lublin
- County: Janów
- Gmina: Potok Wielki

Stany Nowe [ˈstanɨ ˈnɔvɛ] is a village in the administrative district of Gmina Potok Wielki, within Janów County, Lublin Voivodeship, in eastern Poland.
