= Maciej Żywno =

Polish politician (born 1976)

Maciej Zenon Żywno
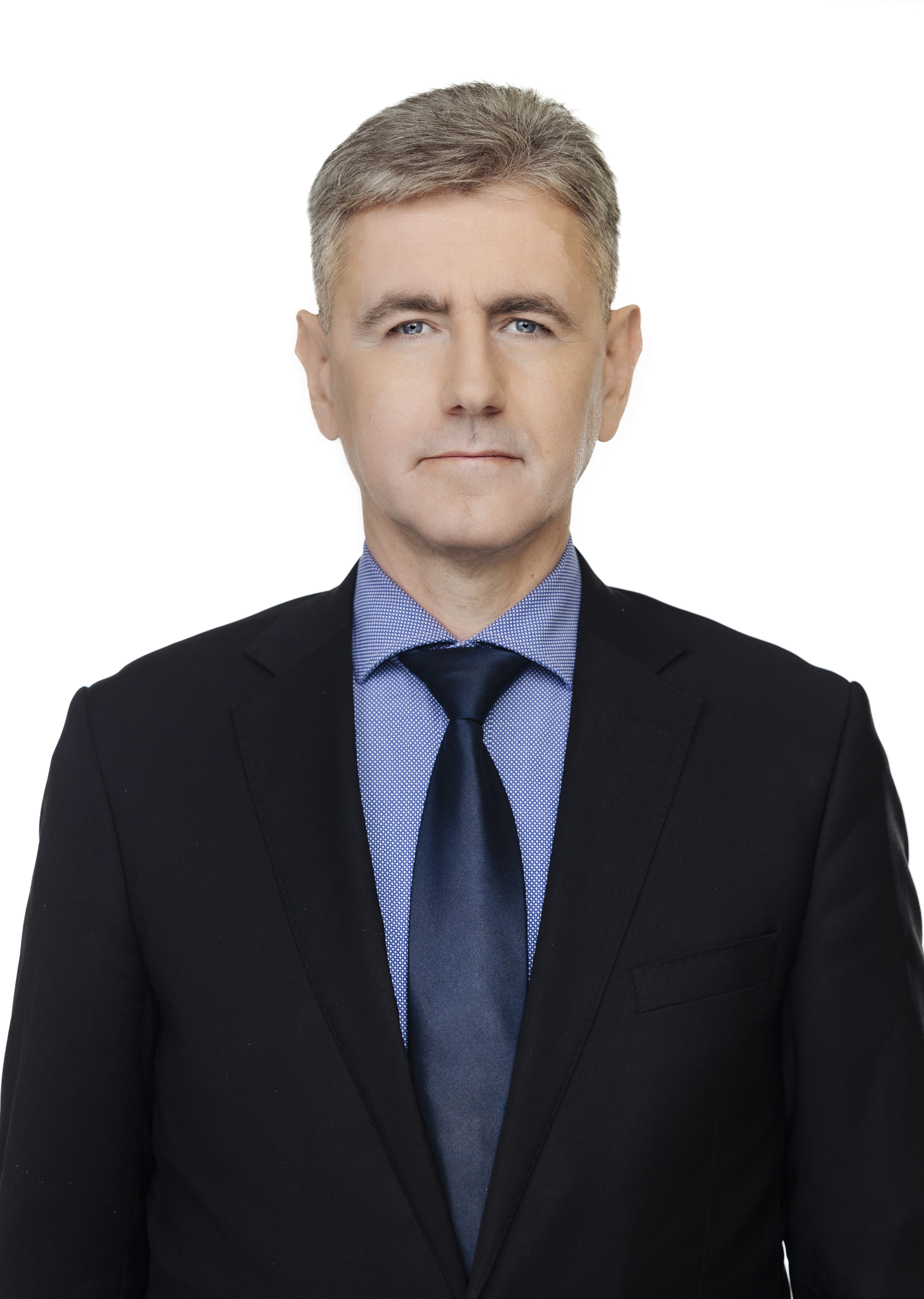

Deputy Marshal of the Senate
- Incumbent
- Assumed office 13 November 2023 Serving with See List
- Marshal: Małgorzata Kidawa-Błońska

Member of the Senate
- Incumbent
- Assumed office 13 November 2023
- Constituency: 60-Białystok

Voivode of Podlaskie Voivodeship
- In office 29 November 2007 – 28 November 2014
- Prime Minister: Donald Tusk; Ewa Kopacz
- Preceded by: Bohdan Paszkowski
- Succeeded by: Andrzej Meyer

Personal details
- Born: 24 January 1976 (age 50) Białystok, Poland
- Party: Poland 2050 (since 2020)
- Education: University of Białystok
- Occupation: Pedagogist, politician

Maciej Zenon Żywno (born 24 January 1976) is a Polish politician, educator, academic teacher, social animator and local government official, in 2007-2014 Voivode of Podlaskie Voivodeship, Vice-Marshal of Podlaskie Voivodeship of the 5th term (2014–2018), senator of the 11th term, Vice-Marshal of the Senate of the 11th term.

== Biography ==
Son of Zenon and Lucyna. Graduate of the Baczyński 3rd Secondary School named after Baczyński in Białystok. He graduated from the Faculty of Pedagogy and Psychology at the University of Białystok and completed Postgraduate Studies in Non-Governmental Organizations Management at Collegium Civitas in Warsaw and Postgraduate Studies in Administration at the University of Warsaw. By profession, he is a teacher, social animator, local government employee and trainer of non-governmental organizations. He was an instructor of the Scouting Association of the Republic of Poland at the rank of scoutmaster. Firefighter and rescuer of the Volunteer Fire Department in Jurowce, educator and trainer of the Association for the Support of Local Activity CAL in Warsaw and member of the National Association of Trainers of Non-Governmental Organizations STOP in Warsaw.

He worked as the manager of the Municipal Center for the Animation of Culture, Tourism, Sports and Recreation in Wasilków. From January 2003, he served as the plenipotentiary of the mayor of Białystok for cooperation with non-governmental organizations. In 2006, he took up the position of city secretary.

On November 29, 2007, he was appointed Voivode of Podlaskie Voivodeship on the recommendation of the Civic Platform. In 2010, the Podlaskie Voivodeship Sejmik of PO selected him as a candidate for the Marshal of the Podlaskie Voivodeship, but this candidacy was not accepted by the councilors. On December 12, 2011, Maciej Żywno was re-appointed by Prime Minister Donald Tusk as the Voivode of Podlaskie Voivodeship. In 2011, he was designated by the PO regional council as a candidate for the Senate, but he resigned from running.

He ended his term as voivode on November 28, 2014, deciding to take up the mandate of councilor of the Podlaskie Voivodeship Sejmik obtained in the 2014 local elections. On December 8, 2014, he was appointed deputy marshal of the Podlaskie Voivodeship on the Voivodeship executive board during the 5th term. In 2015, he ran unsuccessfully for the Senate. In February 2016, he became the chairman of the party's municipal structures in Białystok. In 2018, he retained his mandate as a councilor of the regional council for the 6th term.

He also became an academic teacher at the University of Białystok and the president of the ACTIVUS Institute of Local Community Development. He took up the position of representative of the management board of a private enterprise for public-private partnership.

In February 2019, he left PO, and then in March 2019 he took up the position of secretary of the Gródek commune, from which he later resigned. In January 2021, he joined Szymon Hołownia's movement - Poland 2050, as the person responsible for supervising activities related to local government. In March 2022, he became one of the party's vice-chairmen.

In the 2023 Polish parliamentary election, he ran for the Senate on behalf of the Third Way list in district no. 60. He was elected to the Senate, the upper house of the Polish Parliament, receiving 159,531 votes. On November 13 of the same year, he was elected deputy speaker of the Senate.
