= Waldemar Witkowski =

Polish politician (born 1953)

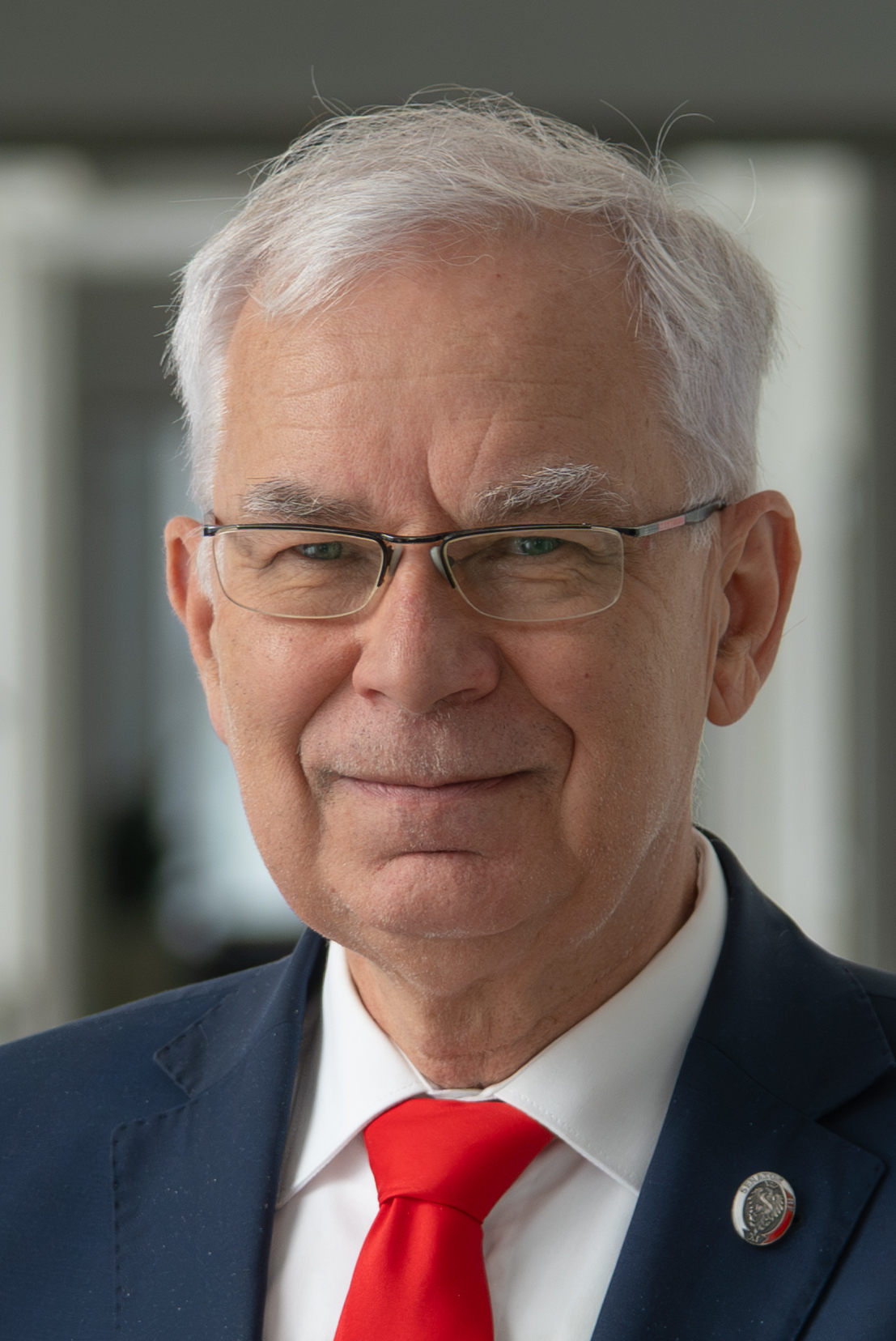
- Witkowski in 2025

Member of the Senate
- Incumbent
- Assumed office 13 November 2023
- Constituency: No. 1

Member of the Greater Poland Voivodeship Sejmik
- In office 2006–2018

Personal details
- Born: Waldemar Włodzimierz Witkowski; 29 October 1953 (age 72) Poznań, Poland
- Party: Labour Union
- Other political affiliations: Polish United Workers' Party (1976–1990); Left and Democrats (2006–2008); The Left (since 2023)

Waldemar Włodzimierz Witkowski (born 29 October 1953) is a Polish politician, currently serving as a senator. He has been a leader of the Labour Union since 2006, and from 2006 to 2018 served as a member of the Greater Poland Voivodeship Sejmik.

== Biography ==
Witkowski was born in Poznań in 1953. He is married and has two children: a daughter, Monika, and son, Maciej. Witkowski is also a notable cooperative movement activist. He was a member of the Polish United Workers' Party from 1976 until the party dissolved itself in 1990. Then he joined the Labour Union, and quickly rose to become one of the union's leaders in Greater Poland Voivodeship.

Witkowski served as an honorary member of the executive body of the re-election campaign of President Aleksander Kwaśniewski in 2000 (when the Labour Union supported Kwaśniewski).

The Labour Union and Democratic Left Alliance (SLD) formed a coalition prior to the 2001 parliamentary elections. Witkowski served as one of the coalition's campaign leaders, although he didn't run himself for the Sejm or the Senate.

From 2001 to 2005, he was first deputy of the Greater Poland Voivode. In the 2005 presidential election, he supported Marek Borowski.

Witkowski served as a member of the Greater Poland Voivodeship Sejmik from 2006 until 2018.

He was elected a leader of the Labour Union on 25 February 2006. The Labour Union, the Democratic Left Alliance, the Social Democrats of Poland (SdPl) and the Polish Democratic Party (PD) formed the Left and Democrats (LiD) coalition in 2006, just prior to the impending local government elections. Witkowski became one of the joint leaders of the new grouping alongside Wojciech Olejniczak of SLD, Janusz Onyszkiewicz of PD, Marek Borowski of SdPl and former President Kwaśniewski.

Witkowski contested the October 2007 parliamentary elections, as a LiD candidate in the district of Poznań. However, despite being No. 2 on the party list, he did not manage to gain enough votes for election to the Sejm (lower chamber of parliament).

Witkowski was also one of eleven candidates in the 2020 presidential election. He did not submit 100,000 eligible signatures until after the election day change, which resulted in the electoral commission denying his application. The decision was overturned by the Supreme Court. In the 28th of June vote he received 27,290 ballots (0.14% nationwide), leaving him second-to-last, with just Mirosław Piotrowski getting 6 thousand fewer. Witkowski refused to endorse any of the two candidates in the runoff.

Witkowski was elected member of the Senate in 2023 representing Constituency no.1. He sits with The Left parliamentary group.

== Honours ==
- Knight's Cross of the Order of Polonia Restituta (2012)
- Gold Cross of Merit (1999)
- Silver Cross of Merit (1994)
- Bronze Cross of Merit
