= Senate of Poland =

Upper house of the parliament of Poland

Coordinates: 52.2256°N 21.0300°E

Senate of the Republic of Poland Senat Rzeczypospolitej Polskiej
- 11th term

Type
- Type: Upper house of the Polish parliament

History
- Founded: 1493 (historical); 1921 (modern); 1989 (restored)
- Disbanded: 1946–1989

Leadership
- Marshal of the Senate: Małgorzata Kidawa-Błońska, KO since 13 November 2023
- Deputy Marshal of the Senate: Rafał Grupiński, KO; Magdalena Biejat, NL; Maciej Żywno, PL2050; Michał Kamiński, UED vacant, PiS since 13 November 2023

Structure
- Seats: 100 senators (51 majority)
- Political groups: Government (64): KO (42) (Note: KO (36); T!DPL (1); Independent (6)); L (8) (Note: NL (4); UP (1) (Note: Waldemar Witkowski); PPS (1) (Note: Wojciech Konieczny); WJ (2) (Note: Magdalena Biejat, Anna Górska)); TD (8) (Note: PSL (4); PL2050 (1); CdP (1) (Note: Kazimierz Michał Ujazdowski); Independent (2) (Note: Michał Kamiński, Józef Zając)); NP–C (6); Other (1): Non-aligned (2); Opposition (33): PiS (31) (Note: PiS (28); Independent (3)); R+ (2); Vacant (1): Vacant (1)

Elections
- Voting system: Plurality voting in 100 constituencies
- First election: 5–12 November 1922 (modern) 4–18 June 1989 (restored)
- Last election: 15 October 2023
- Next election: On or before 11 November 2027

Meeting place
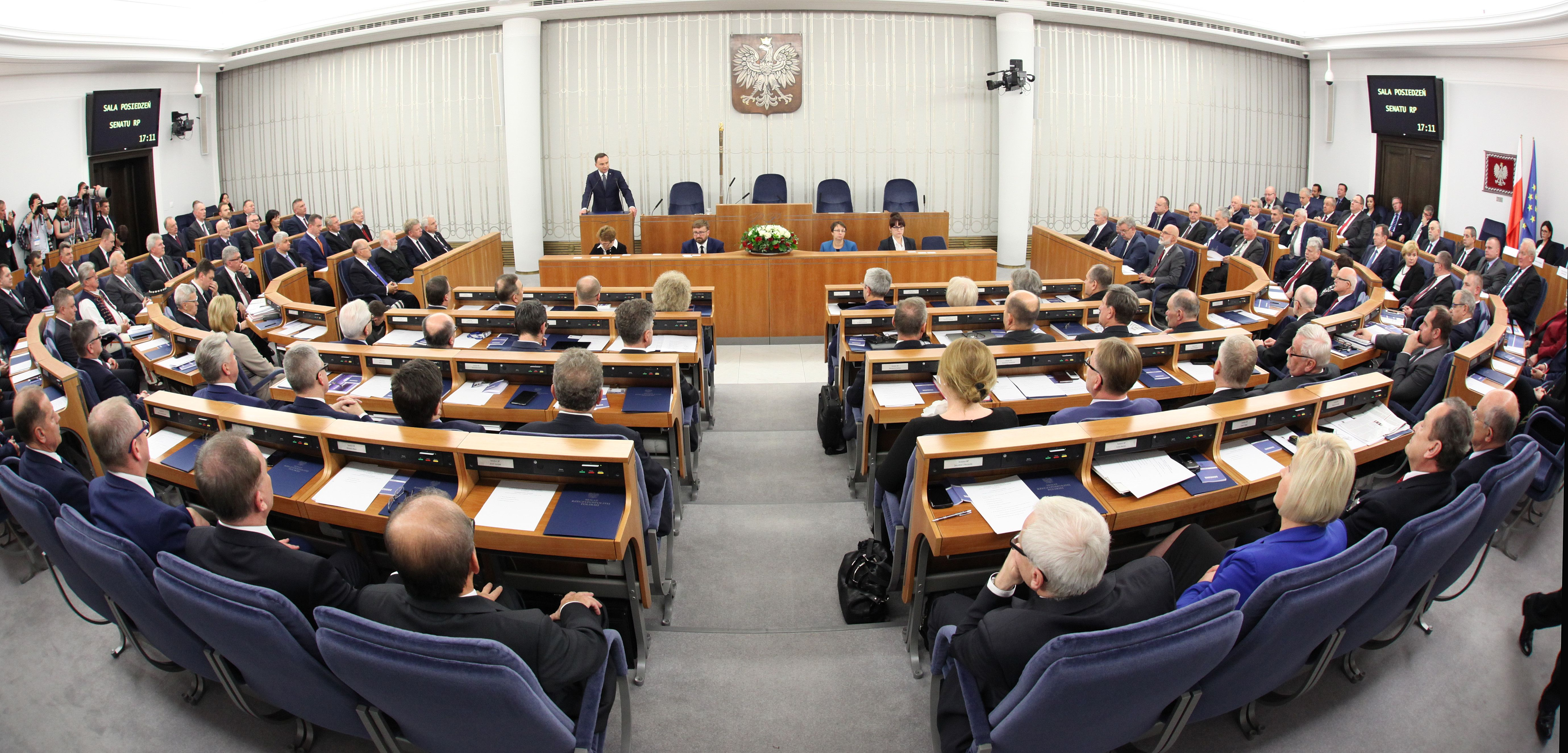
- The Sejm and Senate Complex, Warsaw

Website
- senat.gov.pl

Rules
- "The Rules and Regulations of the Senate". senat.gov.pl. Archived from the original on 1 September 2022.

The Senate (Polish: Senat) is the upper house of the Polish parliament, the lower house being the Sejm. The history of the Polish Senate stretches back over 500 years; it was one of the first constituent bodies of a bicameral parliament in Europe and existed without hiatus until the final partition of the Polish state in 1795. The contemporary Senate is composed of 100 senators elected by a universal ballot and is headed by the Marshal of the Senate (Marszałek Senatu). The incumbent Marshal of the Senate is Małgorzata Kidawa-Błońska.

Following a brief period of existence under the Second Polish Republic, the Senate was again abolished by the authorities of the Polish People's Republic. It was not re-established until the collapse of the communist government and reinstatement of democracy in Poland in 1989. The Senate is based in Warsaw and is located in a building which forms part of the Sejm Complex on Wiejska Street, in close proximity to the Three Crosses Square and Ujazdów Castle.

Like most parliaments in the European Union, Poland's parliament is asymmetric, where the lower chamber is dominant over the upper chamber. Unlike the Sejm, the Senate cannot unilaterally veto legislation nor can it bring down the government in a vote of no confidence, and the chamber and its members generally receive far less attention compared to the Sejm.

== Role ==
In line with Article 10, Paragraph 2, and Article 95 of the Polish Constitution of 2 April 1997, the Senate and the Sejm exercise legislative power. The Senate is composed of 100 senators who are elected for a term of four years in general election in a direct vote by secret ballot. Alongside the Sejm, the President of the Polish Republic, the Council of Ministers and all citizens of Poland, the Senate has the right to take legislative initiatives.

If it is necessary for the Sejm and Senate to convene jointly as a general session of the National Assembly, this joint session will be chaired by the Marshal of the Sejm or by the Marshal of the Senate. The Senate is allowed 30 days to examine any piece of draft legislation passed by the Sejm, 14 days if a bill is considered to be urgent. Any bill submitted by the Sejm to the Senate may be adopted by the latter without any amendments or amended or rejected (but any rejection or amendment may still be overruled by an absolute majority vote in the Sejm). Any resolution of the Senate, as a result of which a bill is repealed or amended, is considered to be passed provided it has not been rejected by the Sejm.

However, for the state budget, the Senate has 20 days to examine it. For amending the constitution, the Senate has 60 days for analysis. If the constitution is amended, identical wording of the amendment must be approved by both the Sejm and the Senate.

The president cannot decide to stage a nationwide referendum on matters of national importance except with explicit permission from the Senate. The Senate is also empowered to examine any reports submitted by the Commissioner for the Protection of Citizens' Rights and the National Broadcasting Council. Other than its significant involvement in the legislative process, the Senate is required to grant its consent in the case of appointment or removal of the President of the Supreme Chamber of Control, the President of the Institute of National Remembrance – Commission for the Prosecution of Crimes against the Polish Nation, the Commissioner for Protection of Citizens' Rights and the Ombudsman for Children and the General Inspector for Personal Data Protection.

However, unlike the Sejm, the Senate has no role in providing for oversight of the executive. The Senate currently appoints one member of the National Broadcasting Council, two members of the Council of the Institute of National Remembrance, two of its own senators to sit on the National Judiciary Board and three members of the Monetary Policy Council of the National Bank. The Marshal of the Senate and any 30 senators may also request the Constitutional Tribunal to examine any act of domestic legislation or international agreement to check that it complies with the constitution, ratified international agreements, and other legislation.

Since the adoption of the Treaty of Lisbon, the Senate also has the right to report issues about option and implementation of European legislation in Poland to the central authorities of the European Union.

== History ==
=== Kingdom and Commonwealth ===
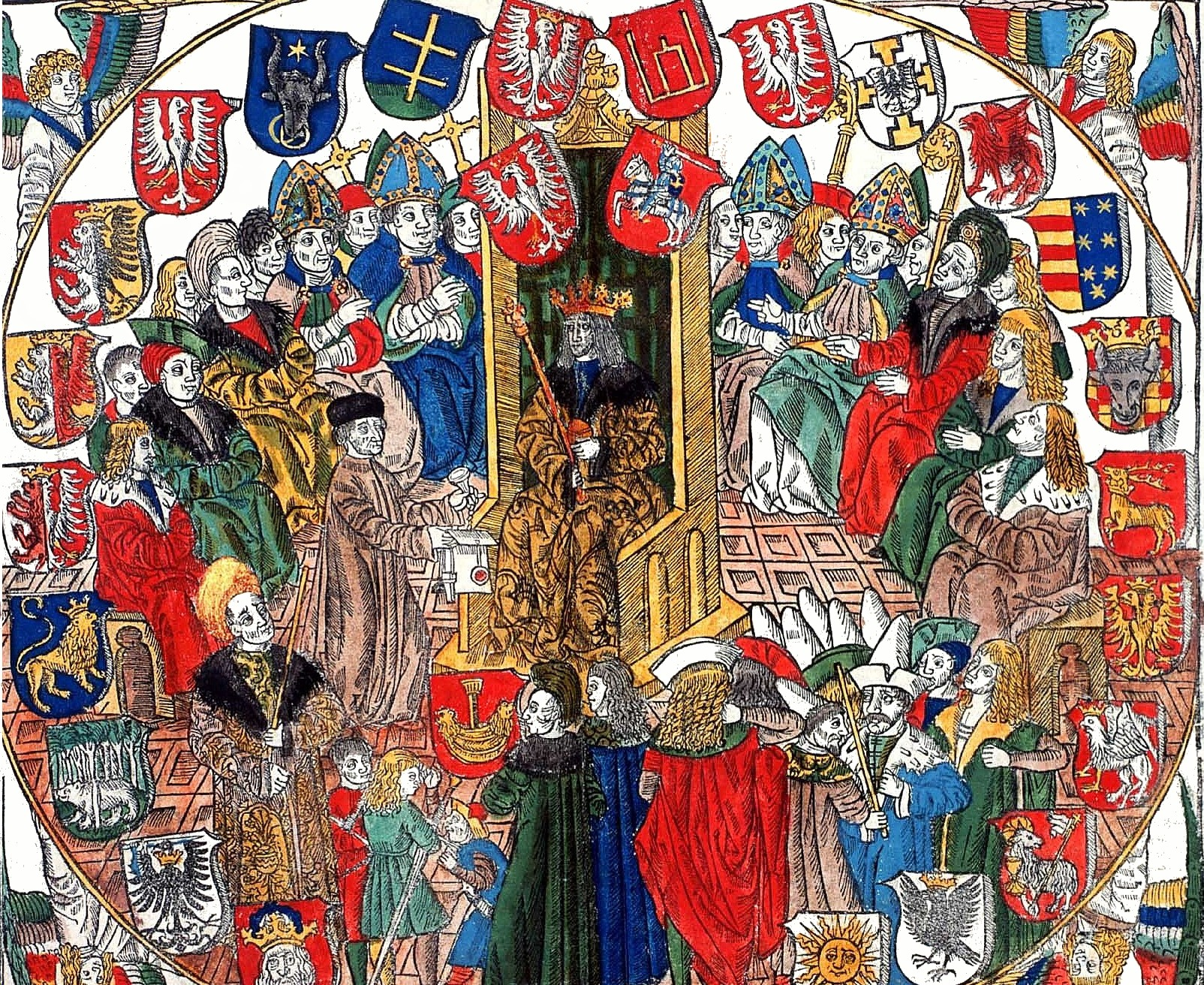
A leaf from the Łaski Statute depicting the Polish Senate in 1503

The Senate can be traced back approximately five hundred years to a council of royal advisors. In the Nobles' Democracy, the Senate was a privy council rather than an upper chamber of the Sejm, and consisted of members of the royal cabinet and the royal court, together with burgraves, voivodes, prefects and castellans (all appointed by the king), and Catholic bishops (see Senatorial offices for details). It was not until 1453 that the first mention was made of a two chamber legislative body in which the 'lords' of the kingdom were represented in a 'council of lords', however, by 1493 the Sejm, made up of the king, Senate and Chamber of Deputies was finally established as a permanent legislative body for the Polish kingdom.

In 1501 at Mielnik, senators attempted to force the soon to be crowned king Alexander I Jagiellon to devolve all royal powers relating to the governing of the state to them. However, whilst Alexander first agreed, after his coronation he refused to affirm this privilege. Later the Nihil Novi act of 1505 affirmed the right of both the Chamber of Deputies and Senate to propagate common law for the kingdom. In 1529 the Senate finally reached a decision on its own composition; after the accession of Mazovia to the Kingdom of Poland, the Senate became composed of Roman Catholic diocesan bishops, voivodes, lesser and greater castellans, ministers (grand chamberlain, chancellor, deputy chancellors, grand treasurer and court Marshal), all of whom were appointed for life by the king. At this time the competences of the Senate were also laid down as pertaining to participation in legislation, foreign policy and the Sejm Court.

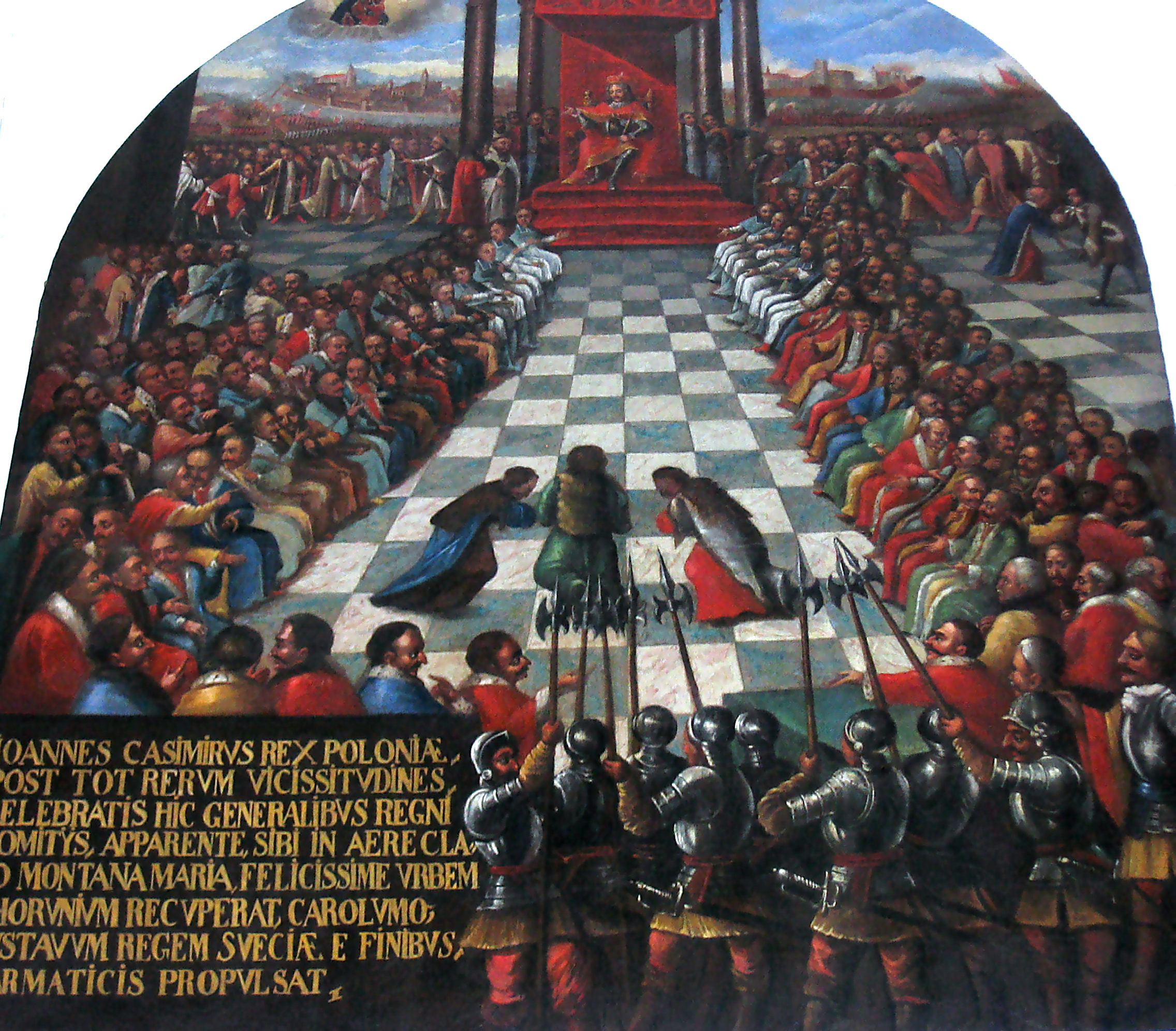
The 1661 session of the Senate in Jasna Góra

In 1537 the Senate followed a course of action which would have seen it become the most important institution in protecting landowners’ rights and freedoms. However, this view was at odds with those of Sigismund I the Old who believed that the Senate was becoming far too powerful. Resultantly, over the period of 1562–69, the Senate lost many of its powers and influence, eventually becoming subordinate to its formerly-equal companion body, the Chamber of Deputies. In 1569 a very important milestone was achieved when the Union of Lublin was signed and senators of the Grand Duchy of Lithuania were incorporated into the Royal Senate of Poland in order to form the Senate of the Polish–Lithuanian Commonwealth. In addition to this, senators from the autonomous Duchy of Prussia, a fiefdom of the Polish king, were incorporated after having been absent since gaining autonomy in 1466. After these developments the Senate was composed of 142 senators: 15 bishops, 35 provincial governors, 31 greater castellans, 47 lesser castellans and 14 ministers.

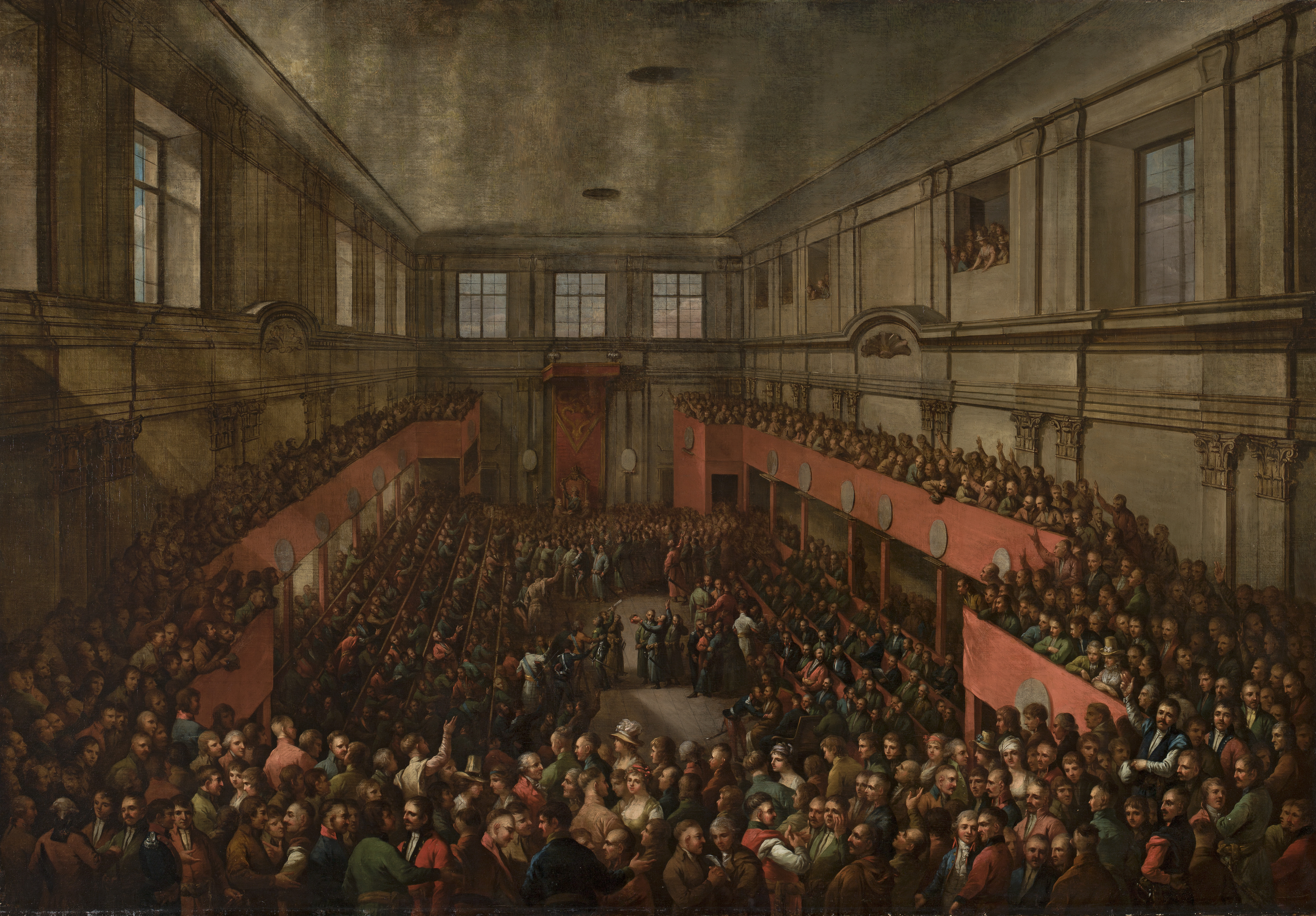
In 1791 the Great Sejm adopts the May 3 Constitution at the Royal Castle in Warsaw

This old senate did not include the separate post of the Senate Marshal. The Senate's sessions were presided over by the king, who was represented in person by the 'grand royal marshal', a figure who could ultimately be described as prime minister of the kingdom. It was this marshal who, on behalf of the king, presided over joint sessions (in which both the Senate and Chamber of Deputies took part) of the Sejm. Should the grand royal marshal by absent, sessions were presided over by the court's crown marshal. Both of these two marshals sat in the Senate and, like other senators, enjoyed a lifelong appointment by the king.

The most important senator or 'president of the senate' was, at the time, the archbishop of Gniezno, who was the honorific 'First Prince of the Kingdom' (Primus Princeps), regarded as a vicegerent second only to the king. The archbishop presided over sessions of the Senate during periods of the king's absence. The primate even had the right to convene 'secret' councils with the Senate without the king's permission and, should the need arise, even against his will. During periods of interregnum the primate immediately became the interrex (acting monarch), and thus could convene the Sejm at will.

In 1573 the Senate received new rights under the Henrician Articles; these allowed the Senate to reprimand the king and instructed that the monarch must always be accompanied by an advisory body of at least four senators. The Senate also ruled that the king must not arbitrarily propagate new laws and that he must first consult with the Senate before entering into marriage or agreeing to inter-state alliances. Under King Sigismund III of Poland and later his son, King Władysław IV, the Senate grew in importance and kings began to rule with the help of an advisory body in which they placed most of their trust. This body was colloquially known as the 'Little Senate' and was made up of a number of highly trusted senators loyal to the king.

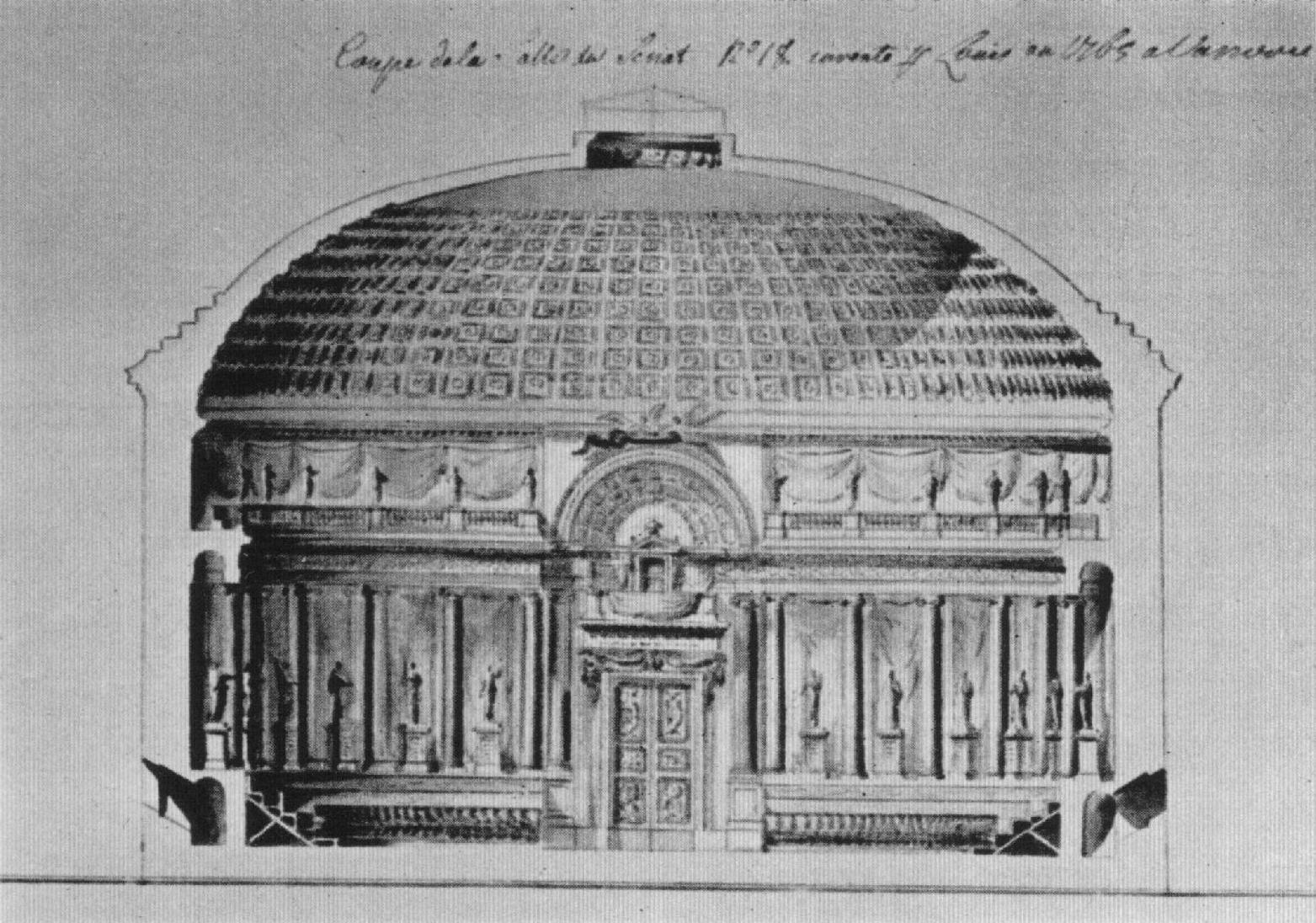
Unrealised (1765) plans for a new senate chamber at the Royal Castle in Warsaw

In 1631 and 1632 the Senate first used its right to veto constitutional acts adopted by the Chamber of Deputies. This marks the first phase of the Senate's demise as powerful nobles (known as the magnates) begin to exercise their power in the legislature. By 1669 the situation had become so bad that landowners took to the streets and, angered by the magnates machinations during the earlier royal election of Michael I, shot at passing senators. By 1717 the king was obliged to implement recommendations given by the senators-resident and by 1773 the cardinal laws pertaining to the 'power of legislating for the Republic in three estates' had been passed and the Senate had begun to hold joint debates with the Chamber of Deputies as a single 'united' Sejm. As a result, in 1775, the senators-resident or 'Little Senate' were abolished and were replaced with a 'Permanent Council' of senators and deputies headed by the king.

In 1791 a particularly important development took place when the May 3rd Constitution removed the king from the three estate Sejm and transformed the previously equal Chamber of Deputies and Senate into a modern parliament comprising a lower house (Chamber of Deputies) and upper house (Senate). The Senate, however, lost much of its right to legislate and, whilst still appointed by the king, senators were now to be chosen and put forward by provincial legislative bodies known as Sejmiks.

The Senate continued to exist until 1794, right up until the Kościuszko Uprising. In 1795 the third partition of Poland took place, thus ending the first chapter of the Senate's history.

=== Partitions ===
During the existence of the Grand Duchy of Warsaw and the Congress Kingdom of Poland the president of the Senate presided over the Senate; this officer of state was appointed for life by the king, and was chosen from among the ordinary, secular senators. Additionally, in the Congress Kingdom the Senate was on an equal footing with the Chamber of Deputies, it was then composed of bishops, provincial governors, castellans and princes of the imperial blood. Despite this, the Senate of the Congress Kingdom had very little power and was largely a powerless, representative institution.

=== Second, People's and Third republics ===
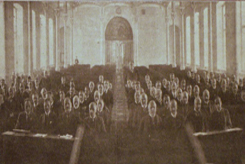
The first session of the reestablished Senate in 1922 after its 127-year hiatus

In the newly re-established Poland after the First World War, the March Constitution of 1921 set out a system whereby the Senate would be led by its Marshal and Deputy Marshals who were elected via a simple majority system by senators from among their ranks, they were then expected to serve for the Senate's term of office; the same rules were followed under the April Constitution of 1935. In the Second Polish Republic, senators were elected by universal ballot.

In the 1921 constitution the Senate was established as the upper house of the Polish parliament, which from then on was to be known as the 'National Assembly', with the previously overarching term 'Sejm' being used to refer only to the lower house of parliament. The senate, whilst not having the right to introduce legislation, was entrusted with the right of veto over the Sejm, the right to demand written explanations of policy decisions from government ministers and a part to play in electing, along with the Sejm, the president of the Republic in a unified secret ballot. At the time the Senate was composed of 111 senators, each of whom was elected to represent, along with a number of others, one of Poland's sub-national provinces. The term of office for senators amounted to five years. During the inter-war period the senate met in five convocations.

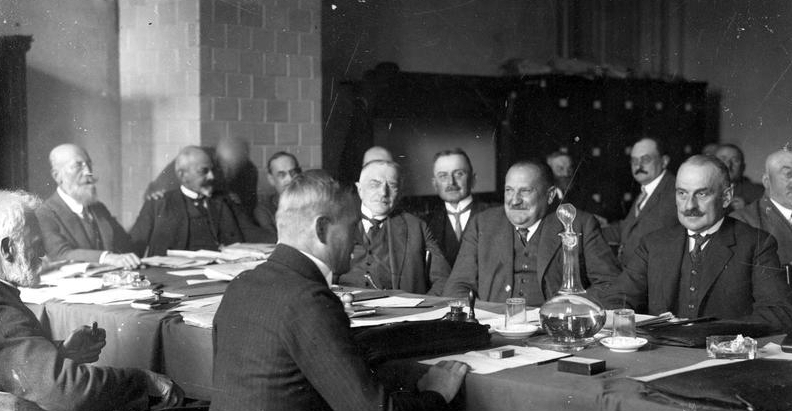
The Senate Agricultural Committee, 1925

After a failure in 1926 to consolidate its powers and receive the right to introduce legislation, the Senate continued to function in its original 1921 role, until the May Coup of 1926, after which the Senate became the supreme legislative body of the republic and increased its power at the expense of that of the Sejm. However, it was still largely subordinate to the president and, until the death of coup-instigator Józef Piłsudski, Chief of State. After the invasion of Poland by German forces, on 2 November 1939, the president of Poland Ignacy Mościcki ordered that the Senate and Sejm cease to operate and remain in recess until the end of the war, after which elections were ordered to take place within 60 days after the cessation of hostilities; this however, was never to take place.

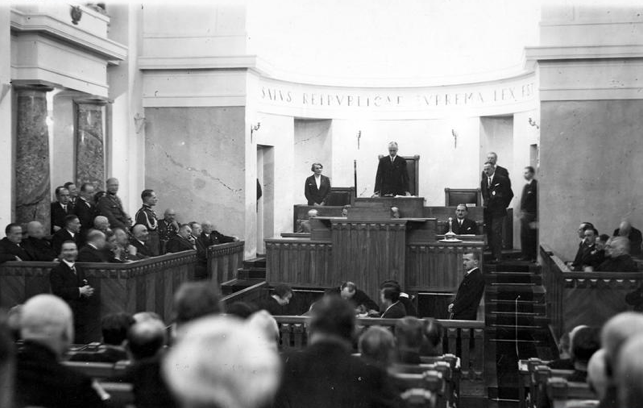
A debate taking place in the Senate, 9 December 1930

After a referendum organised in 1946 by the Communist regime, the Senate was abolished in the post-Second World War People's Republic of Poland. It is estimated, based on actual results obtained after the fall of Communism in 1989, that should the referendum have been fairly organised, the real outcome would have shown that 73% of respondents were in favour of retaining the Senate in the legislative system and the institution would not have been abolished. Indeed, in Kraków, where the opposition managed to ensure a fair vote, the 'no' result relating to the question as to whether people favoured the abolition of the Senate was recorded as being 84%.

The Senate was only reestablished after the agreement struck between the Communists and Solidarity in 1989. During the first election to the newly reestablished senate in 1989 the future-president Lech Wałęsa's Solidarity Movement won 99 of the 100 seats being contested, with the final seat being taken by an independent. This enormous size of this defeat greatly embarrassed the ruling Polish United Workers' Party and hastened their exit from power, thus paving the way for the establishment of a democratic Poland and the foundation of the third republic, in which the Senate was to become a permanent upper house of the new bicameral legislature.

== Modern day ==
The term of office of a senator is four years. The Senate may reject or amend the bills passed by the Sejm but any rejection or amendment may still be overruled by an absolute majority vote in the Sejm. A joint session of the Senate and the Sejm is known as a National Assembly. Traditionally, the Senate takes particular care of Polonia, Polish communities outside Poland.

Until 2010, senators were elected by a plurality bloc voting method, where two or more candidates with the highest support are elected from each electoral district, and each voter selects as many candidates as there are seats (i.e., there is no proportional representation). The exact number of senators from each electorate was dependent on its population and varied from two to four. Initially, this system was employed in a two-round variant, but it was switched to a one-round version as early as the 1991 Polish parliamentary election.

Since 2011, senators are elected by the single member, one-round first-past-the-post voting method.

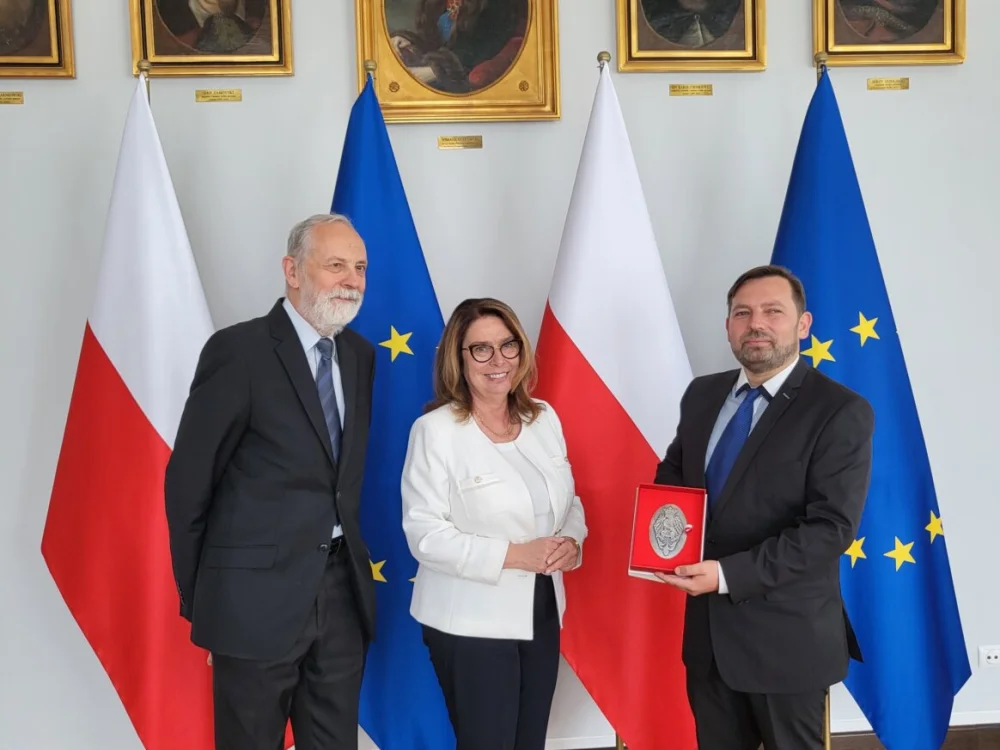
Małgorzata Kidawa-Błońska, Marshal of the Senate of the Republic of Poland, presents the Medal of the Senate of the Republic of Poland to Dawid Jung, 2024

== Current term ==
=== Composition ===
↓
8	42	12	4	34
L	KO	TD	NiS	PiS

=== Presidium ===
Office	Holder	Terms of office	
Senior Marshal	Michał Seweryński	13 November 2023	
Marshal	Małgorzata Kidawa-Błońska	13 November 2023	Incumbent
Deputy Marshals	Magdalena Biejat	13 November 2023	Incumbent
Deputy Marshals	Rafał Grupiński	13 November 2023	Incumbent
Deputy Marshals	Michał Kamiński	13 November 2023	Incumbent
Deputy Marshals	Maciej Żywno	13 November 2023	Incumbent

== Historical composition of the Senate ==
=== Second Republic (1918–1939) ===
PPS / NPR / SCh / Centrolew / PSL "W" / PSL "P" / Minorities / Jews / Germans / Ukrainians / Others/Independent / Catholic Bloc / ZLN/ChZJN / BBWR / OZN / SN
1922	7 / 3 / 8 / 17 / 23 / 4 / 1 / 48
1928	10 / 2 / 3 / 7 / 21 / 5 / 6 / 9 / 48
1930	13 / 3 / 4 / 2 / 77 / 12
1935	96
1938	1 / 6 / 23 / 66

=== PRL (1945–1989) ===
PRON / KO "S"
1989	1 / 99

=== Third Republic (since 1989) ===
SRP / UP / SLD / NL / "S" / PSL (Note: PSL was a left-wing party until about 2008, and shifted towards the centre-right afterwards.) / TD / BBWR / PO / KO / UD / UW / Others / Independent / KLD / ROP / AWS / Senate 2001 / PL / PC / ZChN / PiS / KPN / LPR
1991	4 / 11 / 7 / 21 / 21 / 3 / 6 / 5 / 9 / 9 / 4
1993	2 / 37 / 36 / 9 / 4 / 4 / 1 / 1 / 2 / 4
1997	28 / 3 / 5 / 5 / 8 / 51
2001	2 / 75 / 4 / 2 / 15 / 2
2005	3 / 2 / 34 / 5 / 49 / 7
2007	60 / 1 / 39
2011	63 / 2 / 4 / 31
2015	34 / 4 / 61
2019	2 / 43 / 3 / 4 / 48
2023	9 / 41 / 11 / 5 / 34

== Building ==
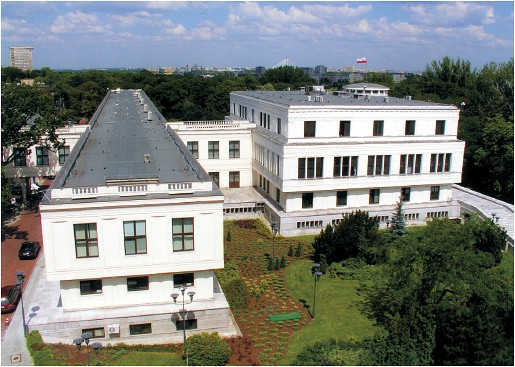
The Senate Building at the Sejm complex in Warsaw

The Senate building was originally an administrative building of the Polish Sejm that was built in the early 1950s and eventually became the Sejm library. However, in 1989, with the re-establishment of the Senate, the need for a permanent workplace for the new institution became obvious. At the time only the Sejm's chamber was big enough to hold Senate debates, so, as a compromise the Senate made temporary use of the Sejm chamber whilst plans for a new Senate building were drawn up. In the meantime the senate's administrative offices and facilities for senators were moved into Bohdan Pniewski's 1950s east wing of the Sejm complex.

It eventually became clear that the system of alternating with the Sejm in using the latter's debating chamber was becoming more and more problematic, and so, after another 18 months, during which the Senate made use of the Hall of Columns in the Sejm, work on the new Senate chamber finally began. The project revolved around a plan designed by architects Andrzej and Barbara Kaliszewski and Bohdan Napieralski, which would see three conference rooms on the first floor of what is now the Senate building combined to make one usable space, whilst not changing the external elevations of the building or significantly changing its interior style or character. Decorated in a scheme close to that of Pniewski's, which utilises a great number of soft shades of white and grey, the Senate chamber blends well with the rest of its architectural surroundings. The furniture for the chamber, much of which is upholstered in blueish-grey material was specially designed for the Senate's use and incorporates many design features characteristic of 1950s Polish modernism.

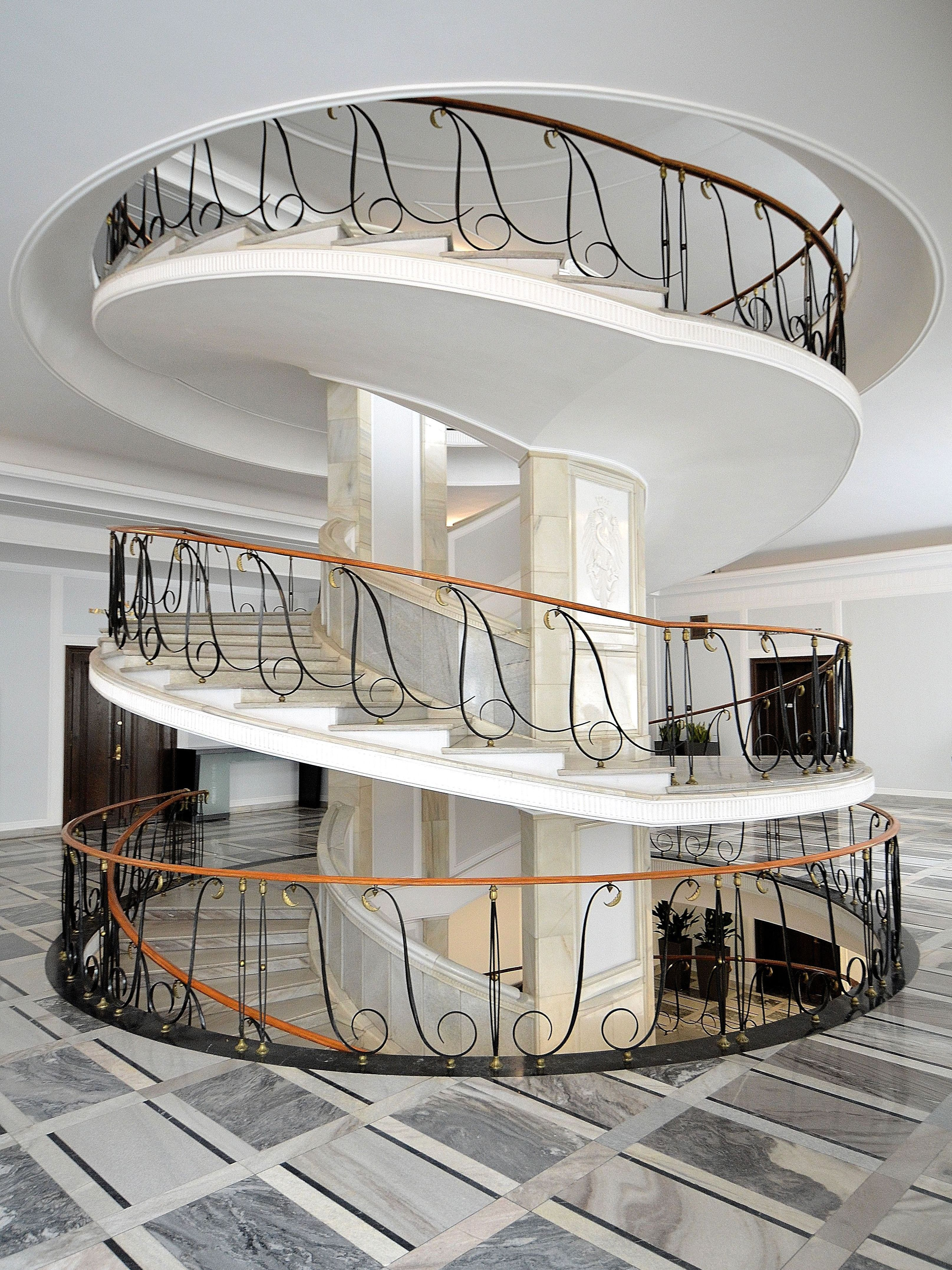
The iconic spiral staircase in the Senate building's main hall

Whilst the Senate chamber does have one elevation incorporating large windows, which look out into the Sejm gardens, the specially designed curtain, which was designed to cover them must always be drawn during debates and it is, in fact, rare to ever see it open. The necessity to close the curtains during debates exists to stop the sun's glare from distracting or disturbing senators during plenary sessions. Behind the presidium, the back of which faces the glazed elevation, hangs a large copy of the coat of arms of Poland. On either side of the presidium there are places available for government advisors and independent experts who may be required to take part in debates, whilst at the back, around the edge of the chamber there are a small number of places reserved for the public. There is also a special space reserved for the president of Poland, over which hangs an embroidered copy of the presidential jack.

The hall, which provides entrance to the Senate chamber retains, despite renovation in the early 1990s, its original Pniewski architectural features and now serves as a meetings place for senators and their staff before and between debates. In the centre of this same hall stands an iconic spiral staircase, which has become a symbol of the modern Polish Senate; indeed the central pylon of this staircase is decorated with a marble plaque depicting the Senate's traditional emblem, the stylised white eagle intertwined with an 'S'. To the right of the hall the Senate Marshal's office is to be found, along with those of his secretariat and chief of staff. A large reception room also adjoins the hall, and it is in this room that the large oil painting “the Polish Legation and Walezjusz” by Teodor Axentowicz hangs. To the left of the hall is a small foyer for the use of senators and in which hang portraits of all the past marshals of the senate.

The lower floors of the Senate house the administrative offices of the 'Senate Chancellery' whilst others are used by various legislative experts.

== See also ==
- Sejm
- Politics of Poland
- Senate
- Electoral districts of Poland (1935–1939)
