= 2023 Polish parliamentary election =

- 15 October 2023
- Opinion polls
- Registered: 29,532,595
- Sejm

All 460 seats in the Sejm 231 seats needed for a majority
- Turnout: 21,966,891 (74.38%) ▲12.6 pp
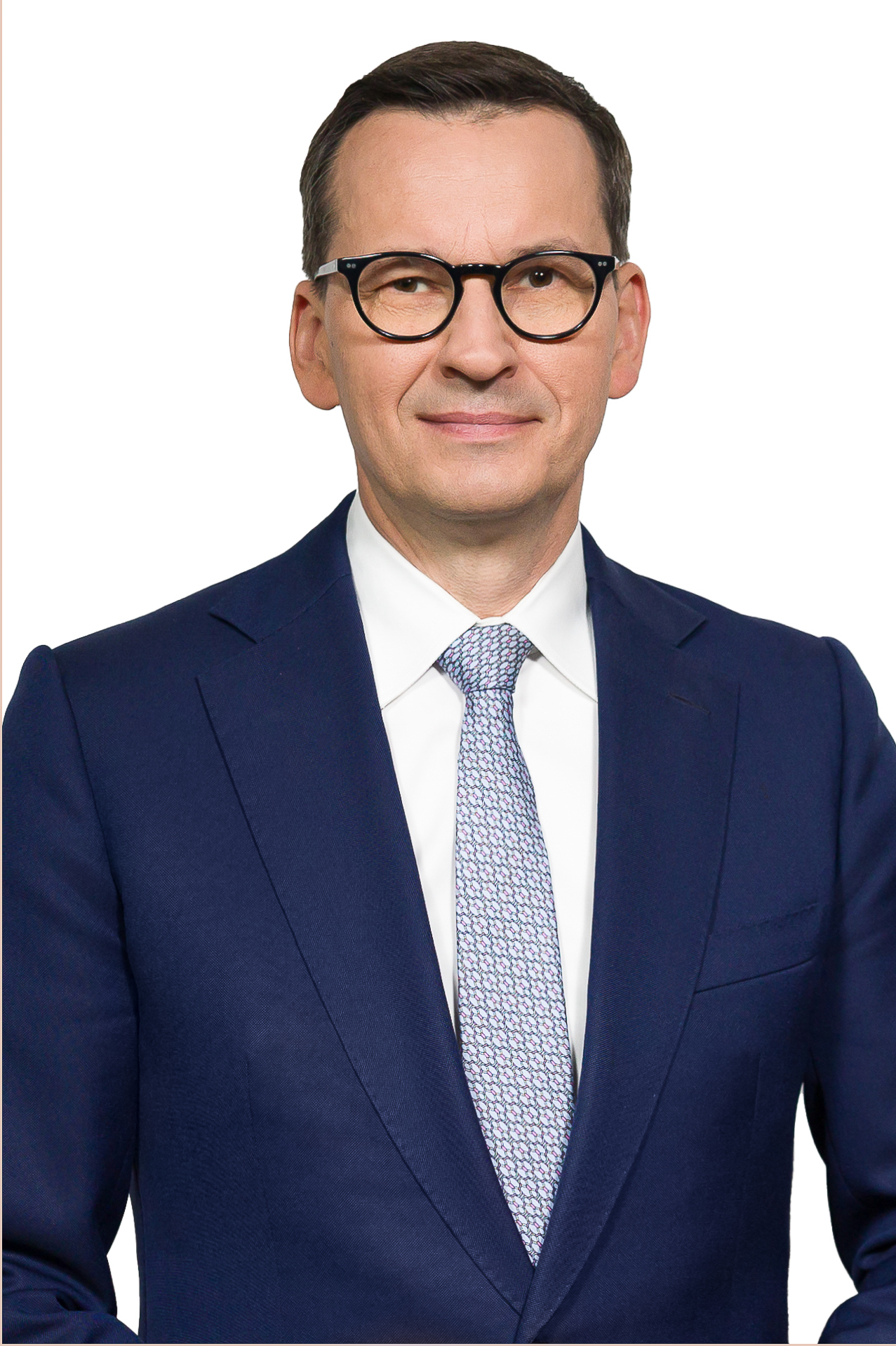

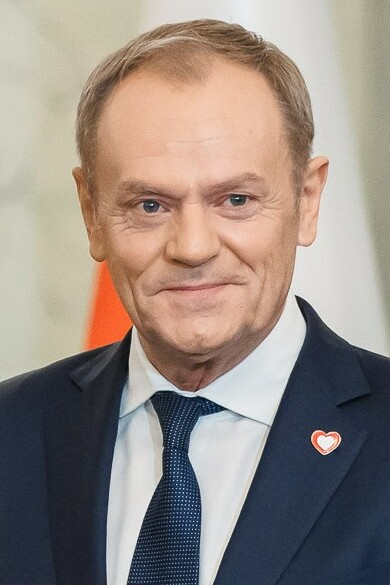

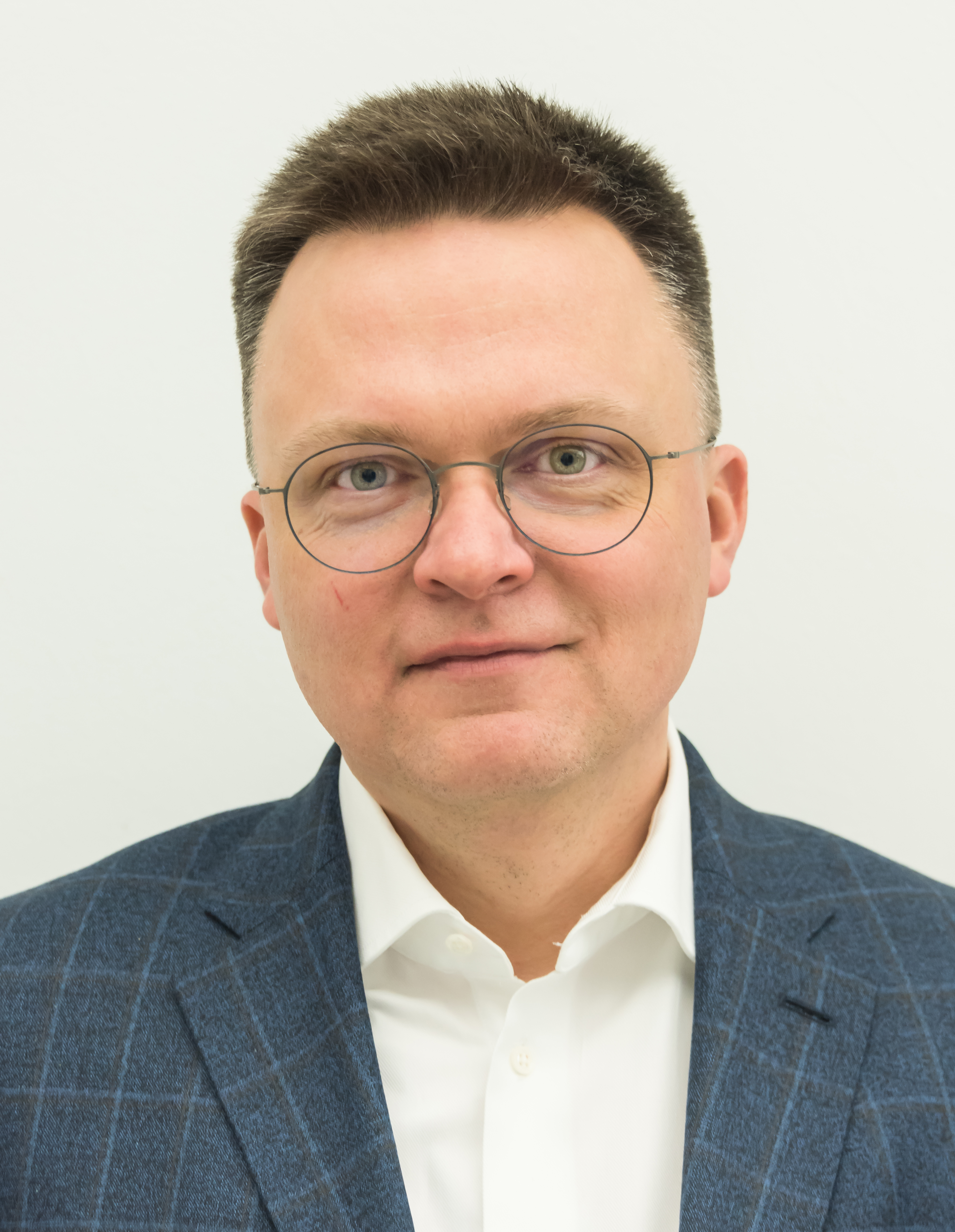

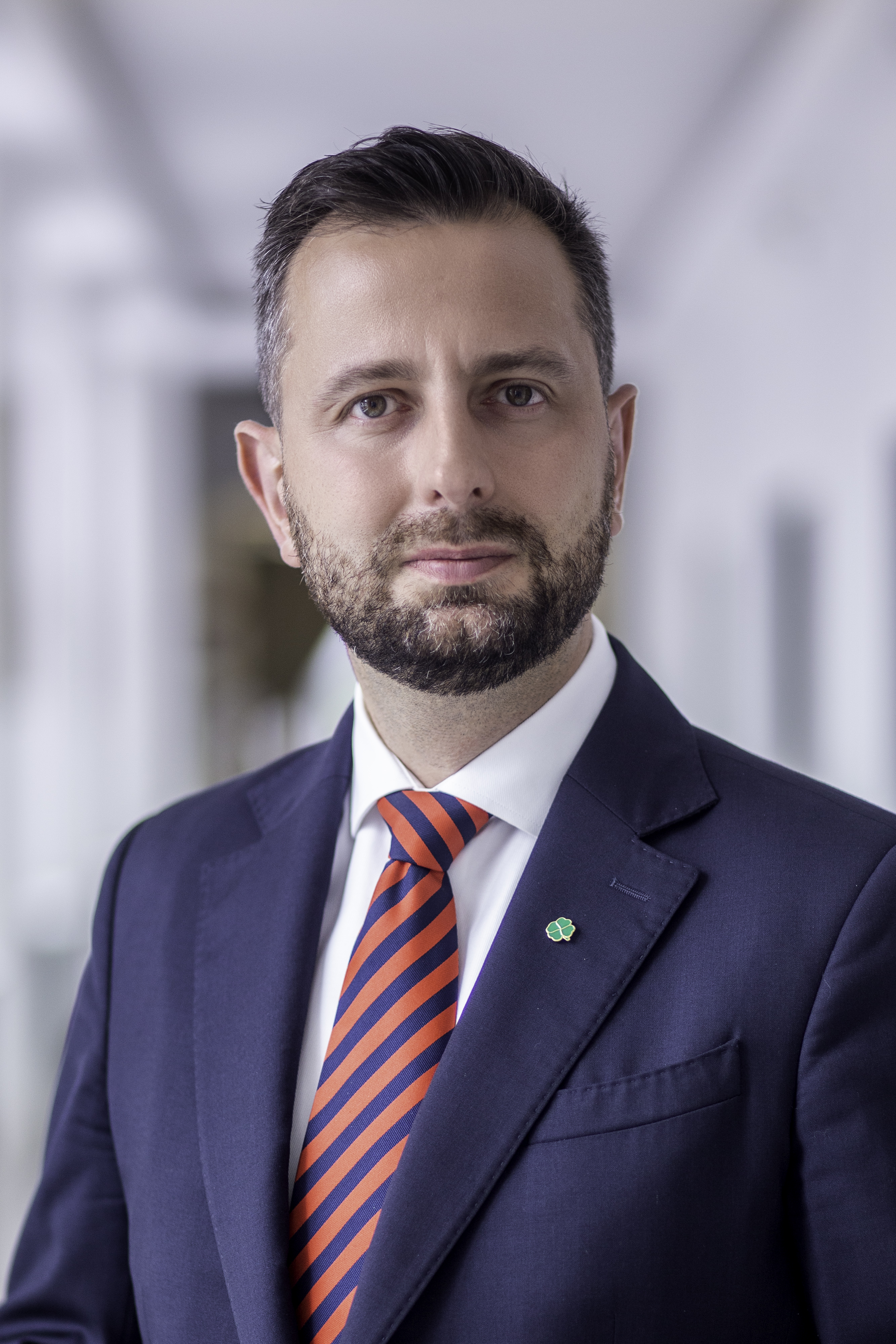

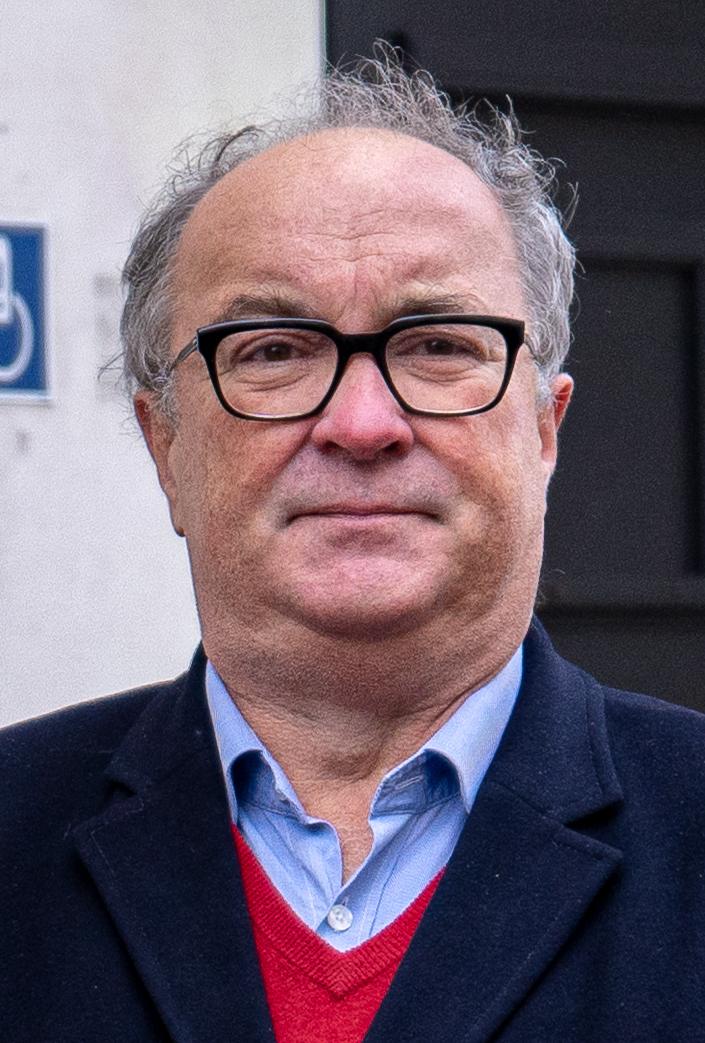

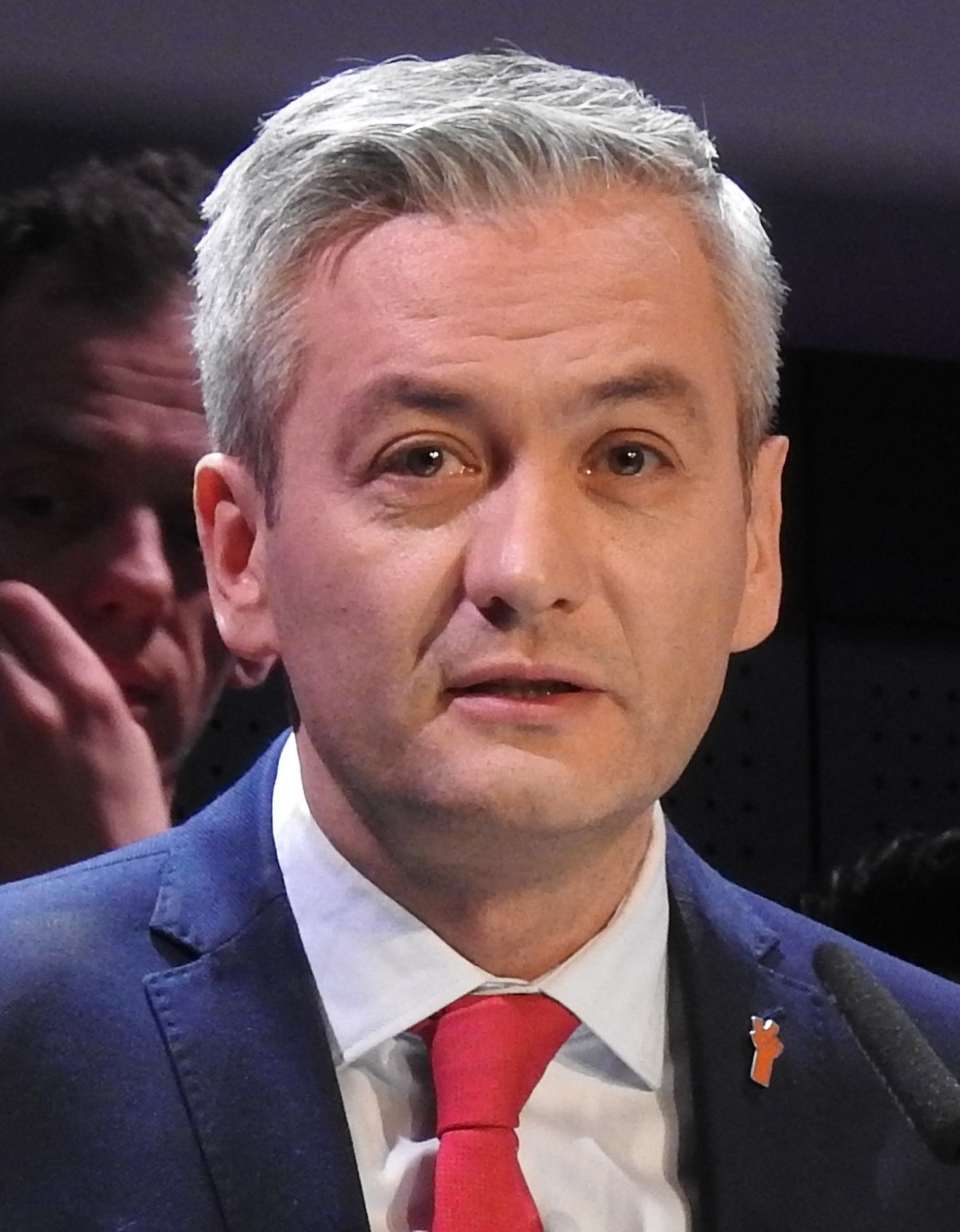

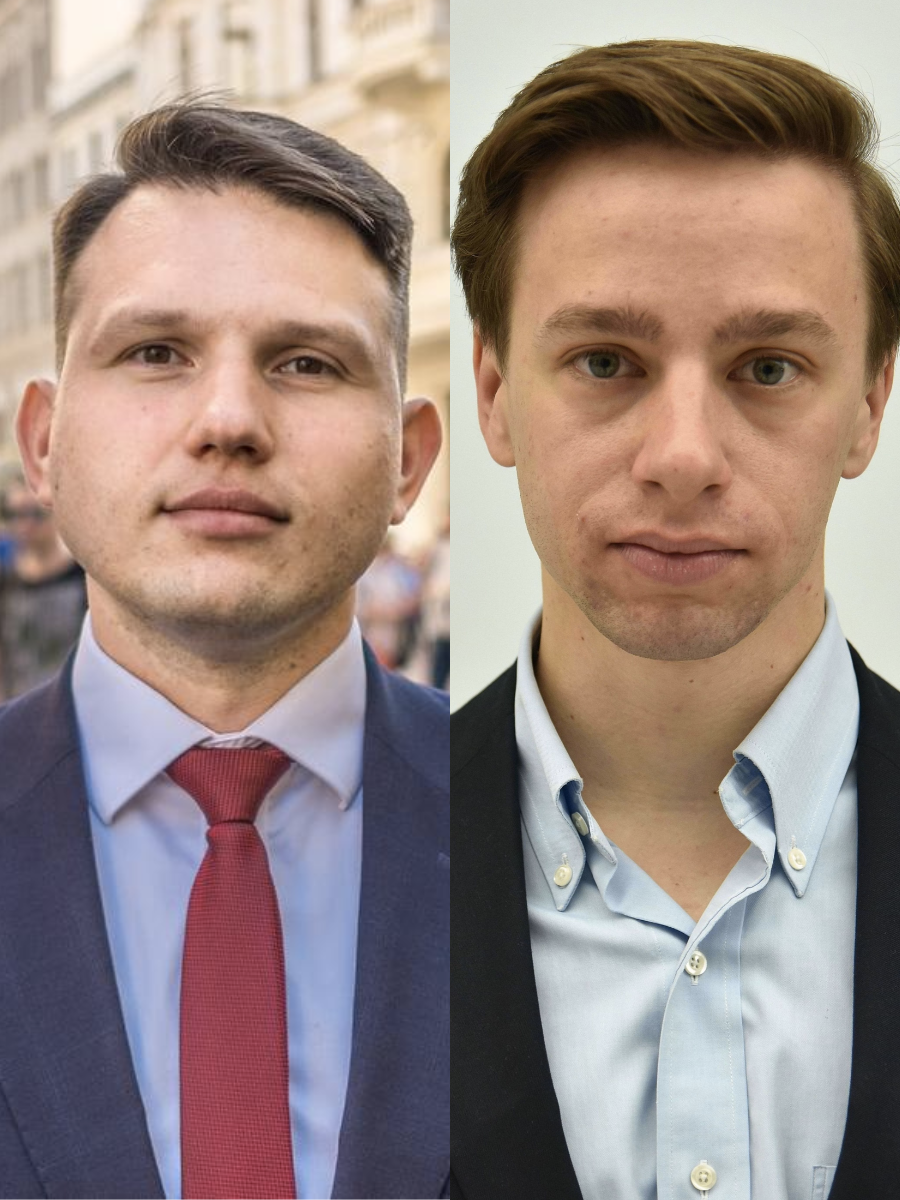
	Majority party	Minority party	Third party
Leader	Mateusz Morawiecki (Note: Jarosław Kaczyński, the leader of the Law and Justice party, named Mateusz Morawiecki as prime ministerial candidate)	Donald Tusk	Szymon Hołownia; Władysław Kosiniak-Kamysz
Party	PiS	PO	PL2050; PSL
Alliance	United Right	Civic Coalition	Third Way
Leader since	11 December 2017	3 July 2021	27 March 2022; 7 November 2015
Last election	43.6%, 235 seats	27.4%, 134 seats	8.6%, 30 seats
Seats won	194	157	65
Seat change	▼41	▲23	▲35
Popular vote	7,640,854	6,629,402	3,110,670
Percentage	35.4%	30.7%	14.4%
Swing	▼8.2 pp	▲3.3 pp	▲5.8 pp
	Fourth party	Fifth party
Leader	Włodzimierz Czarzasty; Robert Biedroń	Sławomir Mentzen; Krzysztof Bosak
Party	NL	NN; RN
Alliance	The Left	Confederation
Leader since	9 October 2021 (Note: Włodzimierz Czarzasty previously also served as chairman of the Democratic Left Alliance between 23 January 2016–9 October 2021 and Robert Biedroń as chairman of Spring between 3 February 2019–9 October 2021 before the consolidation of the two parties into the New Left.)	15 October 2022; 12 May 2023
Last election	12.6%, 49 seats	6.8%, 11 seats
Seats won	26	18
Seat change	▼23	▲7
Popular vote	1,859,018	1,547,364
Percentage	8.6%	7.2%
Swing	▼4.0 pp	▲0.4 pp
- Senate
- All 100 seats in the Senate; 51 seats needed for a majority
- Turnout: 21,944,884 (74.31%) ▲12.6pp
Party	Vote %	Seats	+/–
Senate Pact 2023 (65 seats)
KO	28.91	41	−2
TD	11.50	11	+8
Lewica	5.29	9	+7
Independent	2.68	4	New
Other (35 seats)
ZP	34.81	34	−14
Independent	2.53	1	−3
This lists parties that won seats. See the complete results below.

Government before	Government after election
Second Morawiecki cabinet PiS (ZP)	Third Tusk cabinet (Note: Following the election, Mateusz Morawiecki was first designated as Prime Minister by the President Andrzej Duda with a United Right minority government. He took the oath of office for his third term on 27 November 2023. On 11 December 2023, Morawiecki's government was defeated in a motion of confidence vote, 190 against 266, prompting the fall of his government. The same day, Donald Tusk was elected as prime minister appointee by 248 against 201, being confirmed to the post on 13 December.); KO—PSL—PL2050—NL

Parliamentary elections were held in Poland on 15 October 2023 to elect members of the Sejm and Senate. A referendum containing four questions concerning economic and immigration policy of the government was held simultaneously.

In the previous 2019 Polish parliamentary election, the ruling right-wing Law and Justice Party (PiS) had held onto its majority in the Sejm with Prime Minister Mateusz Morawiecki forming a second government. The PiS sought to win a third term which would be unprecedented in Polish history. The opposition, including the Civic Platform Party and others, secured a Senate majority. In the lead-up to the 2023 elections, opposition leader and former prime minister, Donald Tusk, led the Civic Coalition political alliance in opposition to the PiS.

The United Right alliance placed first for the third straight election and won a plurality of seats but fell short of a Sejm majority. The opposition, consisting of the Civic Coalition, Third Way, and The Left, achieved a combined total vote of 54%, managing to form a majority coalition government. In the Senate, the opposition electoral alliance Senate Pact 2023 won a plurality of the vote and a majority of seats. Voter turnout was 74.4%, the highest in contested elections and the highest since the fall of the communist Polish People's Republic, beating previous records set in 1989 and 2019.

== Background ==
=== 2019 Polish parliamentary election ===
The 2019 parliamentary election saw a record high turnout, with over 60% of registered electors participating. It also saw the centre-left, in the form of Lewica, entering the Sejm after four years on the outside looking in. Conversely, the far right united under the Konfederacja (Kon) banner to enter one of the two chambers of parliament for the first time since the 2005 elections.

Right-wing parties, coalesced around the ruling national-conservative Law and Justice (PiS) within the United Right (ZP) alliance, won the highest percentage of votes ever received since the complete return to democracy in 1991, maintaining their majority in the Sejm, but losing it in the Senate. The PiS party president, Jarosław Kaczyński, thus saw his position as the country's strongman strengthened, despite occupying no governmental position. This result saw the second reelection of a majority government since the fall of the Eastern Bloc. Despite not defeating PiS, the main opposition party, the liberal Civic Platform (PO), itself within the Civic Coalition (KO) alliance, progressed in the senate, though without winning a majority of seats on its own. The opposition altogether did win a majority of seats in the senate, thanks to Lewica, the Polish Coalition (PSL) and independent candidates' gains.

One month after the vote, the incumbent Prime Minister, Mateusz Morawiecki, formed his second government. Its composition showed the so-called "moderate" right strengthened, which Morawiecki was part of, alongside a weakening of the "radical" right, led by the Justice minister Zbigniew Ziobro. This strategy was mainly to appeal to the more moderate electorate for the 2020 Polish presidential election. Morawiecki's government received the Sejm's confidence on 19 November with 237 votes for, 214 against and three abstentions.

=== 2020 presidential election ===
The 2020 presidential election saw the reelection of incumbent president Andrzej Duda, a former member of Law and Justice. Originally planned in May, the elections were very affected by the then ongoing COVID-19 pandemic. The government's proposal to maintain the election in May but only through postal votes launched a strong polemic, with the opposition denouncing the unequal campaigning capacities of the incumbent president compared to other candidates within the context of the lockdown and quarantine measures. The election was then postponed to late June following a compromise within the ruling coalition and the opposition's approval, partly thanks to the latter's control of the Senate.

Despite the pandemic, both rounds of voting saw higher turnouts, with Duda facing the Mayor of Warsaw, Rafał Trzaskowski, a member of Civic Platform. Duda beat Trzaskowski, gathering 51% of the votes against the latter's 49%. These results were the most closely fought presidential elections since the return of democracy.

Duda's victory allows PiS take advantage from his presidential veto in case of an opposition victory in the legislative elections, with the opposition needing a three-fifths majority, which currently amounts to 276 seats, to override one.

=== 2023 Polish protests ===
In May 2023, a law previously passed by the Sejm with the votes of the governing parties came into force, which provides for the establishment of a commission that can, without a court order, exclude politicians from public office for a period of ten years if, in their opinion, the politician was influenced by Russian interests. According to the law, the commission must examine whether this applies to Polish government politicians from 2007 (after PiS' defeat in the 2007 election). According to critics, the law could have been used as an instrument to prohibit selected opposition politicians from taking part in the parliamentary elections. Polish media therefore spoke of a "Lex Tusk" – a law aimed at the opposition leader and former prime minister Donald Tusk (2007–2014), who could have been excluded from the parliamentary elections in October 2023 as the potentially most promising opposition candidate. PiS party circles repeatedly accused Tusk of making Poland dependent on energy imports from Russia during his term as head of government. The law drew strong criticism from the United States and the European Union, which expressed concern that the law jeopardized freedom and fairness in elections in Poland. President Duda then softened the law by introducing an amendment to the Sejm on 2 June 2023, which deprived the proposed commission of the previously planned right to impose a ban on political activity.

On 4 June 2023 (the anniversary of the first partially free elections in Poland in 1989) according to organizers, citing the city administration, half a million people took part in a "Great March for Democracy" organized by Tusk's Civic Platform in Warsaw to protest against the law. There were also protests with tens of thousands of participants in other cities, including Krakow, Szczecin and Częstochowa. The demonstration in Warsaw was joined by numerous civil rights movements, the Civic Platform spoke of the largest demonstration in Poland's history since the fall of communism in 1989. The protest march through the center of Warsaw was also led by the former Polish President Lech Wałęsa.

== Electoral system ==
The President of Poland set the election day to be Sunday, 15 October 2023. This date was consistent with requirements posed in Article 98 Section 2 of the Polish Constitution, whereby the election is to take place within the final 30 days of the current term of Parliament (ending 11 November 2023). The vote ought to be held on a non-working day – a Sunday or a public holiday. Other possible dates included 22 October, 29 October, 1 November, 5 November and 11 November.

The process of election for the Sejm is through party-list proportional representation via the D'Hondt method in multi-seat constituencies, with a 5% threshold for single party (KW) and citizen committees (KWW) and an 8% threshold for coalitions (KKW). National minority committees, such as the German minority, can apply to be exempt from the nationwide threshold, and in such case participate in the d'Hondt seat distribution within their constituency, in this specific case Opole, regardless of the national share of votes. Contrary to popular belief, minority committees are not guaranteed seats in the parliament.

The 100 Senate constituencies

Senators are elected by first-past-the-post method in 100 constituencies. Most of the opposition (Civic Coalition, New Left and Third Way) signed a so-called senate pact, under which the parties agreed to enter one commonly accepted candidate in each district. This strategy has previously granted them 51 seats despite losing the Sejm.

== Lists ==
=== Electoral committees registered in all constituencies ===
List			Ideology	Political position	Leader(s)	Parliamentary leader(s)	2019 result		Seats before the election		Candidates	
List			Ideology	Political position	Leader(s)	Parliamentary leader(s)	Votes (%)	Seats in Sejm	Sejm (list)	Senate (list)	Sejm	Senate
1	BS	Nonpartisan Local Government Activists; Bezpartyjni Samorządowcy	Regionalism; Localism	Centre-left	Robert Raczyński	N/A	0.8%	0 / 460	0 / 460	0 / 100	902	40
2	TD	Third Way; Trzecia Droga List: Polish People's Party (PSL); Poland 2050 (PL2050); Union of European Democrats (UED); Agreement for Democracy (PdD); Centre for Poland (CdP)	Centrism; Christian democracy Liberalism	Centre to centre-right	Władysław Kosiniak-Kamysz; Szymon Hołownia	Władysław Kosiniak-Kamysz; Paulina Hennig-Kloska	8.6%	30 / 460	33 / 460	5 / 100	918	28
3	NL	New Left; Nowa Lewica List: New Left (NL); Left Together (LR); Polish Socialist Party (PPS); Labour Union (UP); Social Democracy of Poland (SDPL); Freedom and Equality (WiR)	Social democracy Progressivism	Centre-left to left-wing	Włodzimierz Czarzasty; Robert Biedroń	Krzysztof Gawkowski; Marcelina Zawisza	12.6%	49 / 460	45 / 460	1 / 100	912	14
4	PiS	Law and Justice; Prawo i Sprawiedliwość List: Law and Justice (PiS); Sovereign Poland (SP); Republicans (R); Kukiz'15 (K'15); Renew PR (OdN); Polish Affairs (PS)	National conservatism	Right-wing	Jarosław Kaczyński; Mateusz Morawiecki (PM candidate)	Ryszard Terlecki	43.6%	235 / 460	235 / 460	46 / 100	918	96
5	KON	Confederation Liberty and Independence; Konfederacja Wolność i Niepodległość List: National Movement (RN); New Hope (NN); Confederation of the Polish Crown (KKP); Real Europe Movement – Europa Christi (RPE); Real Politics Union (UPR); Right Wing of the Republic (PR)	Right-wing populism Polish nationalism	Right-wing to far-right	Sławomir Mentzen; Krzysztof Bosak	Krzysztof Bosak	6.8%	11 / 460	11 / 460	0 / 100	913	65
6	KO	Civic Coalition; Koalicja Obywatelska List: Civic Platform (PO); Modern (.N); Polish Initiative (iPL); The Greens (Z); Good Movement (DR); AGROunia (AU); Yes! For Poland (T!DP)	Liberalism	Big tent	Donald Tusk	Borys Budka	27.4%	134 / 460	129 / 460	41 / 100	919	49

=== Electoral committees registered in more than one constituency ===
List			Ideology	Political position	Leader	# of constituencies	Candidates	
List			Ideology	Political position	Leader	# of constituencies	Sejm	Senate
7	PJJ	There is One Poland; Polska Jest Jedna	Right-wing populism Vaccine hesitancy	Far-right	Rafał Piech	39	579	4
9	RDiP	Prosperity and Peace Movement; Ruch Dobrobytu i Pokoju	Welfare nationalism Russophilia	Centre-left	Maciej Maciak	11	155	3
10	NK	Normal Country; Normalny Kraj	Anti-establishment; Right-wing populism	Right-wing	Wiesław Lewicki	4	61	1

=== Electoral committees registered in a single constituency ===
List		Ideology	Political position	Leader	Parliamentary leader	2019 result		Current number of seats		Constituency	Candidates	
List		Ideology	Political position	Leader	Parliamentary leader	Votes (%)	Seats in Sejm	Sejm (list)	Senate (list)	Constituency	Sejm	Senate
AP	Anti-party; Antypartia	Anti-establishment; Direct democracy	Centre	Marek Ciesielczyk	N/A	N/A	0 / 460	0 / 460	0 / 100	8 – Zielona Góra	16	0
MN	German Minority; Mniejszość Niemiecka	Minority interests Social market economy	Centre-left	Ryszard Galla	Ryszard Galla	0.2% (Note: National minority committees are not subject to the 5% threshold.)	1 / 460	1 / 460	0 / 100	21 – Opole	24	1
RNP	Repair Poland Movement; Ruch Naprawy Polski	National conservatism Right-wing populism	Right-wing	Romuald Starosielec	N/A	N/A	0 / 460	0 / 460	0 / 100	18 – Siedlce	16	3

=== Electoral committees with candidates only for the Senate ===
List		Ideology	Political position	Leader	Candidates
MP	Mirosław Piasecki Candidate for Senator RP; Mirosław Piasecki Kandydat na Senatora RP	Populism; Single-winner voting	Centre-right	Mirosław Piasecki	2
ND-T	New Democracy - Yes; Nowa Demokracja – Tak	Economic progressivism Regionalism	Centre-left to left-wing	Marek Materek	5
PS'23	Senate Pact Independents; Pakt Senacki 2023	Pro-Europeanism; Localism	Big tent	N/A	6
PL 2050	Polska 2050 (Note: Not related to Poland 2050 of Szymon Hołownia.)	Social liberalism Pro-industry self-regulation	Centre-left	Włodzimierz Zydorczak	3
Piraci	Polish Pirate Party; Polska Partia Piratów	Pirate politics Freedom of information	Centre	Janusz Wdzięczak	1
PO	Civic Agreement; Porozumienie Obywatelskie	Civic engagement	Centre	Andrzej Dyszewski; Rafał Skiba	2
ŚR	Silesians Together; Ślonzoki Razem	Localism; Silesian autonomism	Centre-left	Leon Swaczyna	2
WiS	Free and Solidary; Wolni i Solidarni	Solidarism; Conservatism	Right-wing	Jan Miller	3
W	Wolnościowcy (Note: Individual candidates running on Third Way and Confederation lists.)	Libertarianism; Minarchism	Right-wing	Artur Dziambor	1
Z	United; Zjednoczeni	Solidarism; Economic nationalism	Left-wing	Wojciech Kornowski	2
ZChR	Union of Christian Families; Zjednoczenie Chrześcijańskich Rodzin	National conservatism Political Catholicism	Far-right	Bogusław Rogalski	5
ZS	Slavic Union; Związek Słowiański	Agrarianism; Economic nationalism	Left-wing	Włodzimierz Rynkowski	2
Other electoral committees with a single candidate					21

=== Electoral committees withdrawn before the election ===
Liberal Poland – Entrepreneurs' Strike has registered electoral lists in 17 constituencies, however on 13 October 2023 the committee has announced its intention to withdraw from the race. The committee's candidates appeared on the ballot, although votes for them were counted as invalid.

List			Ideology	Political position	Leader	# of constituencies	Candidates	
List			Ideology	Political position	Leader	# of constituencies	Sejm	Senate
8	PL!SP	Liberal Poland – Entrepreneurs' Strike; Polska Liberalna Strajk Przedsiębiorców	Libertarianism; Populism	Centre-right	Paweł Tanajno	17	321	0

== Electoral committees ==
Within the stipulated deadline for submitting electoral committees, 94 committees were applied for registration, of which 85 were registered: two coalitions, 40 political parties and 43 voters. 46 committees declared running for both the Sejm and the Senate, three only for the Sejm and 36 only for the Senate.

Electoral committees
	Type	Committee	Status	Sejm lists	Senate lists
1	Party	Confederation Liberty and Independence	Fielded lists	Yes	Yes
2	Party	New Left (Note: The Left registered its committee under the New Left party to circumvent the 8% electoral threshold for electoral coalitions.)	Fielded lists	Yes	Yes
3	Party	Nonpartisan Local Government Activists	Fielded lists	Yes	Yes
4	Party	Liberal Poland Entrepreneurs' Strike	Fielded lists	Yes	No
5	Party	Patriots Poland	Registered	Declared	No
6	Party	There is One Poland	Fielded lists	Yes	Yes
7	Coalition	Civic Coalition PO .N iPL Zieloni	Fielded lists	Yes	Yes
8	Party	Slavic Union	Fielded lists	Declared	Yes
9	Party	Freedom Party	Registered	Declared	Declared
10	Coalition	Third Way PSL-PL2050 of Szymon Hołownia	Fielded lists	Yes	Yes
11	Party	Law and Justice	Fielded lists	Yes	Yes
12	Party	Social Movement AGROunia Yes	Self-dissolved (Note: New Democracy - Yes left the coalition after AGROunia announced it will run on Civic Coalition lists.)	Declared	Declared
13	Party	Non-partisans	Registered	Declared	Declared
14	Party	Anti-party	Fielded lists	Yes	Declared
15	Party	Union of Christian Families	Fielded lists	Declared	Yes
16	Party	United	Fielded lists	Declared	Yes
17	Party	Responsibility	Registered	Declared	Declared
18	Party	Normal Country	Fielded lists	Yes	Yes
19	Voters	Prosperity and Peace Movement	Fielded lists	Yes	Yes
20	Party	Free Europe	Registered	Declared	Declared
21	Party	Poland 2050	Fielded lists	Declared	Yes
22	Party	Repair of Poland Movement	Fielded lists	Yes	Yes
23	Party	Piast – Unity of Thought of European Nations and the World	Registered	Declared	Declared
24	Voters	German Minority	Fielded lists	Yes	Yes
25	Party	Silesians Together	Fielded lists	Declared	Yes
26	Party	Self-Defence of the Republic of Poland	Registered	Declared	Declared
27	Voters	Andrzej Dziuba – Senate Pact	Fielded lists	No	Yes
28	Party	Polish Pirate Party	Fielded lists	No	Yes
29	Voters	Pact Senate for Citizens	Fielded lists	No	Yes
30	Voters	Marcin Nowak	Fielded lists	No	Yes
31	Party	New Hope	Registered	Declared	Declared
32	Voters	Krzysztof Kwiatkowski – Senate Pact	Fielded lists	No	Yes
33	Voters	Krzysztof Lechowski	Fielded lists	No	Yes
34	Voters	Civic Pact Lasecki	Fielded lists	No	Yes
35	Voters	Lidia Staroń – Always on the Side of People	Fielded lists	No	Yes
36	Voters	Robert Roguski	Fielded lists	No	Yes
37	Voters	"Future of Poland"	Rejected	No	Declared
38	Party	Free and Solidary	Fielded lists	Declared	Yes
39	Voters	Independent Candidate Dawid Borowiak	Fielded lists	No	Yes
40	Voters	Polish Anti-war Movement	Rejected	No	Declared
41	Voters	Mirosław Augustyniak Candidate For Senator of the Republic of Poland	Fielded lists	No	Yes
42	Voters	Dariusz Męczykowski	Fielded lists	No	Yes
43	Voters	Jan Maria Jackowski	Fielded lists	No	Yes
44	Party	People's Party "Ojcowizna" RP	Registered	Declared	Declared
45	Party	Congress of the New Right	Registered	Declared	Declared
46	Voters	Prof. Joanna Senyszyn	Registered	No	Declared
47	Voters	Professor Krzysztof Gutkowski	Fielded lists	No	Yes
48	Party	New Democracy - Yes	Fielded lists	No	Yes
49	Voters	Wadim Tyszkiewicz – Senate Pact	Fielded lists	No	Yes
50	Voters	Civic Agreement	Fielded lists	No	Yes
51	Party	Social Alternative	Registered	Declared	Declared
52	Voters	Our Left	Fielded lists	Declared	Yes
53	Party	The Right	Registered	No	Declared
54	Voters	Zygmunt Frankiewicz – Senate Pact	Fielded lists	No	Yes
55	Voters	Beata Mnich	Fielded lists	No	Yes
56	Party	Self-Defence	Registered	Declared	Declared
57	Voters	Józef Zając	Fielded lists	No	Yes
58	Party	Wolnościowcy	Fielded lists	Declared	Yes
59	Voters	Jerzy Markowski	Registered	No	Declared
60	Voters	Liberal Democracy	Registered	Declared	Declared
61	Party	Republican Party	Registered	Declared	Declared
62	Party	Silesian Regional Party	Registered	Declared	Declared
63	Party	Unity of Poles Movement	Registered	Declared	Declared
64	Voters	Lucyna Kulińska in the Service of the Republic	Registered	No	Declared
65	Voters	Non-partisan Anti-system	Fielded lists	Declared	Yes
66	Voters	Yes for Senate RP Jan Kuriata	Fielded lists	No	Yes
67	Voters	Mirosław Piasecki Candidate For Senator of the Republic of Poland	Fielded lists	No	Yes
68	Voters	of Zamojszczyzna	Fielded lists	No	Yes
69	Voters	Nonpartisan Local Government Activists of Galicia	Registered	Declared	Declared
70	Party	Fourth Republic of Poland	Registered	Declared	Declared
71	Voters	Social Poland	Registered	Declared	No
72	Party	Public Interest	Registered	Declared	Declared
73	Voters	Believe in Poland	Registered	Declared	Declared
74	Voters	E-parliament-New Civilization	Registered	No	Declared
75	Voters	Independent is Alive	Registered	Declared	Declared
76	Voters	Kajetan Gornig	Registered	No	Declared
77	Voters	Mariusz Kazimierz Wójtowicz	Fielded lists	No	Yes
78	Voters	Mateusz Pazdan "Cooperation and Honesty"	Rejected	No	Declared
79	Party	Conservative Party	Registered	Declared	Declared
80	Voters	Candidate of the Mountain Land	Fielded lists	No	Yes
81	Voters	From Greater Poland to the Senate	Registered	No	Declared
82	Party	National Movement	Registered	Declared	Declared
83	Voters	Krzysztof Wawrzyniec Borkowski Senate Pact	Fielded lists	No	Yes
84	Voters	Greater Poland Senate Initiative	Fielded lists	No	Yes
85	Voters	Together for Częstochowa	Registered	Declared	Declared
86	Voters	Royal Cities	Rejected	No	Declared
87	Voters	European Left	Fielded lists	No	Yes
88	Voters	"Royal Senate"	Rejected	No	Declared
89	Party	"Piast" Faction	Registered	Declared	Declared
90	Voters	Local Government Initiative Together	Registered	Declared	Declared
91	Voters	Fair Elections	Rejected	Declared	Declared
92	Voters	ROP	Rejected	Declared	Declared
93	Voters	Dr Rafał Stachura – Senate Pact	Rejected	No	Declared
94	Party	Compatriots	Registered	Declared	Declared

== Campaign spending ==
Candidate	Amount	
Candidate	Spent	Cost
PiS	38,772,567	5.07
KO	35,411,078	5.35
TD	28,463,419	9.15
Lewica	16,892,443	9.09
KWiN	11,558,301	7.47
Source: TVN

== Timeline ==
With the President setting the election date to be 15 October 2023, the following schedule was approved by the National Electoral Commission (PKW):

Timeline of the 2023 Polish parliamentary election

Date	Event description
until 28 August	Parties, coalitions and citizen groups can register electoral committees with PKW; Regional voting commissions are to be formed and registered
until 6 September at 16:00	Electoral committees are to deliver lists of candidates
until 11 September	Voting commissions in medical and care facilities, prisons, jails, and student dormitories are to be formed and registered
until 15 September	Voting districts, the location of polling stations, including accessibility information are to be announced; Ship captains are to register maritime voting districts; Electoral committees are to recommend members for polling stations
until 25 September	Local voting commissions are to be constituted; Foreign voting districts and polling stations abroad are to be announced
until 2 October	Disabled and senior voters (60 years of age and above) can: apply to vote by mail, also to receive Braille-ready ballots; apply to receive free-of-charge transport to and from the polling station in their place of residence – in municipalities with no public transport available
until 5 October	Regional voting commissions are to announce candidate lists in their districts; Public transport arrangements in rural and semi-rural districts are to be announced

Date	Event description
until 6 October	Disabled and senior voters can authorize proxy voters
until 10 October	Citizen electoral committees of national minorities can apply to waive the 5% vote threshold
between 1 September and 12 October	Voters can: apply to vote outside their registered address in their country or abroad; or; receive a certificate to vote at any polling station in the country; Soldiers, border guards and other service members can apply to vote in their place of service
between 30 September and 13 October	Polish public radio and TV stations are to broadcast electoral committees' announcements free of charge
On 13 October at 24:00	The electoral campaign is to formally conclude; Election silence commences: no political broadcasts, social media posts or issuing of new physical advertising materials is allowed.
On 15 October	The vote takes place between 7:00 and 21:00; Projected results of the exit poll are announced

== Opinion polls ==
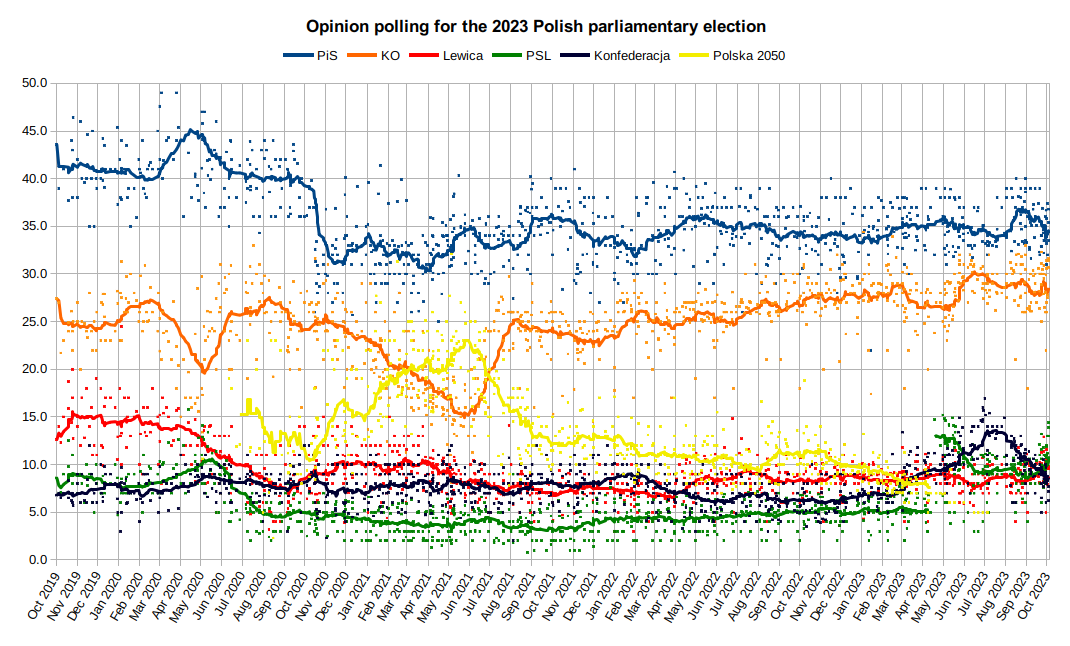

== Results ==
=== Sejm ===
PiS remained the largest party in the Sejm, but with about 35% of the vote, lost its majority and was unable to form a government. The three main opposition groups, Civic Coalition, Third Way and New Left, took 54% of the votes, winning enough seats to allow them to take power. According to the final vote count by the National Electoral Commission, Law and Justice won 194 seats, the Civic Coalition 157, the Third Way 65, The Left 26, and the Confederation Liberty and Independence 18.

Although the German Minority Electoral Committee did win 5.37% of the vote in the Opole region in this election, they came 6th instead of the expected 5th place, falling 5,372 votes short. The Opole Voivodeship represents a total of 12 Sejm seats, and as the 5th place was taken by the far-right Confederation Liberty and Independence, the last 12th seat, which had previously been won by German Minority, went to them instead. As a result, the German Minority Electoral Committee failed to win any parliamentary seat for the first time in 32 years.

Results of the 2023 Polish parliamentary election by powiats

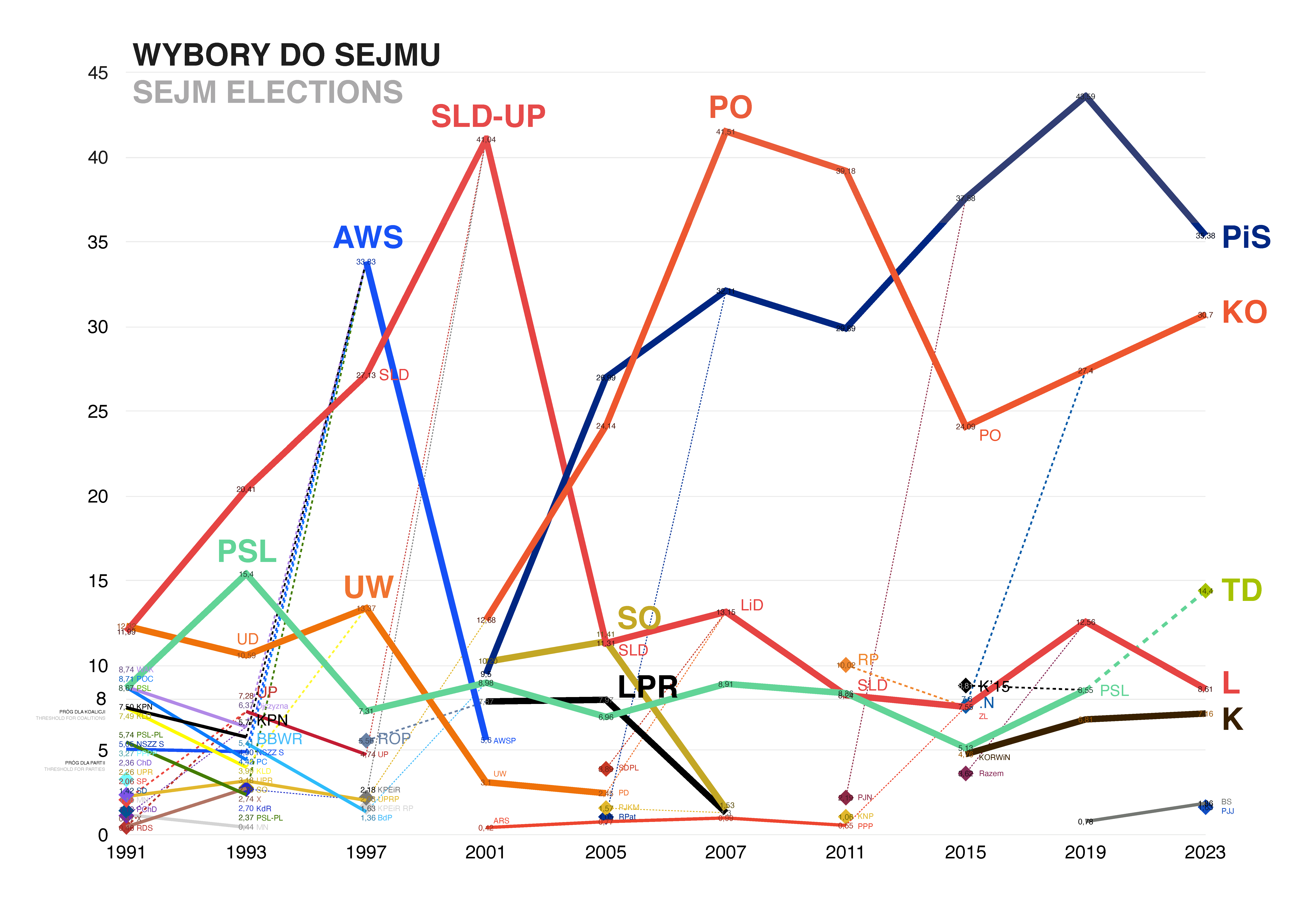
Results of Sejm elections 1991–2023

Party	Votes	%	Seats	+/–
United Right	7,640,854	35.38	194	−41
Civic Coalition	6,629,402	30.70	157	+23
Third Way	3,110,670	14.40	65	+35
The Left	1,859,018	8.61	26	−23
Confederation Liberty and Independence	1,547,364	7.16	18	+7
Nonpartisan Local Government Activists	401,054	1.86	0	0
There is One Poland	351,099	1.63	0	New
German Minority	25,778	0.12	0	−1
Prosperity and Peace Movement	24,850	0.12	0	New
Normal Country	4,606	0.02	0	New
Anti-party	1,156	0.01	0	New
Repair Poland Movement	823	0.00	0	New
Total	21,596,674	100.00	460	0
Valid votes	21,596,674	98.31		
Invalid/blank votes	370,217	1.69		
Total votes	21,966,891	100.00		
Registered voters/turnout	29,532,595	74.38		
Source: National Electoral Commission,

Vote share
PiS	35.38%
KO	30.70%
TD	14.40%
Lewica	8.61%
KWiN	7.17%
BS	1.86%
PJJ	1.63%
Others	0.25%

Seat share
PiS 194	42.17%
KO 157	34.13%
TD 65	14.13%
Lewica 26	5.65%
KWiN 18	3.91%

==== By bloc ====
Graph of the party split among 460 seats.
Party	Votes	%	Seats	+/–
15 October Coalition (KO+TD+Lewica)	11,599,090	53.71	248	+34
Right-wing parties (PiS+KWiN)	9,188,218	42.54	212	−34
Others	809,366	3.75	0	−1
Total	21,596,674	100.00	460	–

==== Party breakdown ====
Party or alliance		Votes	%	Seats	+/–
United Right	Law and Justice	6,286,250	29.11	157	−30
United Right	Sovereign Poland	465,024	2.15	18	+8
United Right	The Republicans	99,373	0.46	4	+3
United Right	Kukiz'15 (Note: Kukiz'15 previously ran under Polish Coalition as independents. The result does not include Paweł Kukiz who is not a party member, but got elected with 43,292 votes.)	74,959	0.35	2	New
United Right	Independents	715,248	3.31	13	−8
United Right	Total	7,640,854	35.38	194	−41
Civic Coalition	Civic Platform	4,992,932	23.12	122	+20
Civic Coalition	Modern	375,776	1.74	6	−2
Civic Coalition	Polish Initiative	252,021	1.17	3	+1
Civic Coalition	The Greens	67,203	0.31	3	0
Civic Coalition	AGROunia	53,571	0.25	1	New
Civic Coalition	Good Movement	8,254	0.04	0	New
Civic Coalition	Independents (Note: Two of the elected independents are also members of Yes! For Poland.)	879,645	4.07	22	+3
Civic Coalition	Total	6,629,402	30.70	157	+23
Third Way	Poland 2050 (Note: Includes 233,917 votes and 2 seats for supported independents.)	1,561,542	7.23	33	New
Third Way	Polish People's Party (Note: Includes 23,051 votes and 1 seat for supported independents.)	1,189,629	5.51	28	+9
Third Way	Centre for Poland	70,117	0.32	3	+3
Third Way	Union of European Democrats	21,056	0.10	0	−1
Third Way	Independents and others	268,326	1.24	1	−9
Third Way	Total	3,110,670	14.40	65	+35
The Left	New Left	1,199,503	5.55	19	−19
The Left	Left Together	453,730	2.10	7	+1
The Left	Independents and others	205,785	0.95	0	−5
The Left	Total	1,859,018	8.61	26	−23
Confederation	New Hope	551,901	2.56	6	+1
Confederation	Confederation (Note: Confederation was registered as a party to circumvent the 8% electoral threshold for electoral coalitions. Five of its elected members are part of National Movement, one of New Hope and one of Confederation of the Polish Crown.)	341,188	1.58	7	+7
Confederation	National Movement	199,149	0.92	0	−5
Confederation	Confederation of the Polish Crown	182,573	0.85	2	+1
Confederation	Independents and others	272,553	1.26	3	+3
Confederation	Total	1,547,364	7.16	18	+7
Nonpartisan Local Government Activists		401,054	1.86	0	0
There is One Poland		351,099	1.63	0	New
German Minority		25,778	0.12	0	−1
Prosperity and Peace Movement		24,850	0.12	0	New
Normal Country		4,606	0.02	0	New
Anti-party		1,156	0.01	0	New
Repair Poland Movement		823	0.00	0	New
Total		21,596,674	100.00	460	0
Valid votes		21,596,674	98.31		
Invalid/blank votes		370,217	1.69		
Total votes		21,966,891	100.00		
Registered voters/turnout		29,532,595	74.38		
Source: National Electoral Commission,

==== By constituency ====
Constituency	Law and Justice		Civic Coalition		Third Way		The Left		Confederation		Nonpartisan Local Government Activists		There is One Poland		Others	
Constituency	%	Seats	%	Seats	%	Seats	%	Seats	%	Seats	%	Seats	%	Seats	%	Seats
1 – Legnica	34.80	5	33.78	5	10.75	1	9.51	1	6.33	0	3.34	0	1.49	0	–	–
2 – Wałbrzych	33.34	3	37.17	4	12.13	1	7.98	0	6.02	0	1.80	0	1.57	0	–	–
3 – Wrocław	26.66	4	36.94	6	13.74	2	11.35	1	6.98	1	2.89	0	1.44	0	–	–
4 – Bydgoszcz	30.45	4	35.01	5	15.06	2	9.92	1	6.42	0	1.67	0	1.47	0	–	–
5 – Toruń	34.06	5	29.52	4	15.68	2	11.25	1	6.37	1	1.44	0	1.25	0	0.42 (Note: Prosperity and Peace Movement)	0
6 – Lublin	45.48	8	20.32	3	15.87	2	5.72	1	8.38	1	1.60	0	2.30	0	0.35	0
7 – Chełm	50.75	7	17.40	2	13.04	2	5.62	0	7.79	1	2.08	0	2.83	0	0.48	0
8 – Zielona Góra	27.76	4	37.73	5	15.07	2	9.27	1	6.51	0	2.31	0	1.12	0	0.22 (Note: Anti-party)	0
9 – Łódź	26.82	3	41.07	5	11.89	1	12.22	1	5.57	0	1.23	0	1.20	0	–	–
10 – Piotrków Trybunalski	46.60	6	21.69	2	13.73	1	6.39	0	7.62	0	2.17	0	1.38	0	0.43	0
11 – Sieradz	41.46	6	25.89	3	14.50	2	7.73	1	6.82	0	1.62	0	1.45	0	0.52	0
12 – Kraków I	42.86	5	24.24	2	14.97	1	6.04	0	7.88	0	1.78	0	2.22	0	–	–
13 – Kraków II	30.68	5	30.73	5	16.86	2	11.04	1	7.71	1	1.51	0	1.47	0	–	–
14 – Nowy Sącz	53.73	6	16.10	2	11.58	1	3.18	0	8.73	1	2.49	0	4.18	0	–	–
15 – Tarnów	48.67	5	17.02	2	18.64	2	4.00	0	7.99	0	1.38	0	2.30	0	–	–
16 – Płock	44.11	5	22.40	3	17.07	2	6.52	0	6.52	0	2.03	0	1.35	0	–	–
17 – Radom	48.68	6	20.96	2	13.98	1	5.34	0	7.31	0	1.71	0	1.53	0	0.50	0
18 – Siedlce	48.62	7	18.71	2	15.51	2	4.85	0	8.21	1	1.86	0	1.90	0	0.35 (Note: Normal Country – 0.19, Repair Poland Movement – 0.15)	0
19 – Warsaw I	20.14	4	43.23	9	13.25	3	13.45	3	6.24	1	1.37	0	1.32	0	–	–
20 – Warsaw II	31.74	4	35.23	4	15.06	2	7.06	1	7.06	1	2.27	0	1.59	0	–	–
21 – Opole	31.26	4	33.59	5	12.74	1	7.24	1	6.49	1	1.57	0	1.74	0	5.37 (Note: German Minority)	0
22 – Krosno	54.70	7	15.85	2	13.79	1	4.47	0	8.62	1	2.07	0	–	–	0.50	0
23 – Rzeszów	51.60	9	17.70	3	12.42	2	4.87	0	9.48	1	1.53	0	2.40	0	–	–
24 – Białystok	42.39	7	20.84	3	18.86	3	4.84	0	9.79	1	1.16	0	1.64	0	0.47	0
25 – Gdańsk	25.20	3	41.70	6	14.70	2	9.41	1	6.23	0	1.44	0	1.32	0	–	–
26 – Słupsk	29.24	4	37.91	6	13.59	2	8.33	1	7.21	1	1.62	0	2.10	0	–	–
27 – Bielsko-Biała I	36.71	4	28.67	3	14.55	1	7.77	0	7.84	1	1.73	0	2.46	0	0.28 (Note: Normal Country)	0
28 – Częstochowa	36.35	3	29.11	3	14.72	1	9.41	0	6.56	0	2.09	0	1.74	0	–	–
29 – Katowice I	30.16	3	36.06	4	13.34	1	9.21	1	6.95	0	1.90	0	2.38	0	–	–
30 – Bielsko-Biała II	38.06	4	29.98	3	12.45	1	6.84	0	8.00	1	2.27	0	2.40	0	–	–
31 – Katowice II	30.88	4	36.79	5	13.27	1	8.46	1	6.70	1	1.80	0	2.10	0	–	–
32 – Katowice III	29.74	3	30.30	3	9.85	1	21.60	2	5.69	0	1.45	0	1.37	0	–	–
33 – Kielce	47.07	8	20.93	4	13.80	2	6.83	1	6.55	1	2.88	0	1.38	0	0.55 (Note: Prosperity and Peace Movement – 0.35, Normal Country – 0.20)	0
34 – Elbląg	35.20	4	31.87	3	15.40	1	8.11	0	6.54	0	1.44	0	1.12	0	0.33	0
35 – Olsztyn	32.33	4	33.07	4	16.11	1	8.09	1	6.93	0	1.98	0	1.48	0	–	–
36 – Kalisz	35.85	5	28.85	4	16.16	2	8.52	1	6.98	0	2.39	0	1.52	0	–	–
37 – Konin	38.69	4	23.99	2	16.63	2	9.48	1	6.97	0	2.35	0	1.38	0	0.51	0
38 – Piła	29.11	3	34.87	4	17.66	2	7.84	0	6.87	0	1.91	0	1.74	0	–	–
39 – Poznań	19.57	2	44.09	5	16.54	2	12.31	1	5.90	0	1.59	0	–	–	–	–
40 – Koszalin	31.36	3	38.69	4	12.35	1	8.72	0	6.02	0	1.63	0	1.24	0	–	–
41 – Szczecin	28.79	4	40.13	6	12.62	1	9.39	1	5.94	0	1.62	0	1.12	0	0.39	0
Poland	35.4	194	30.7	157	14.4	65	8.6	26	7.2	18	1.9	0	1.6	0	0.3	0

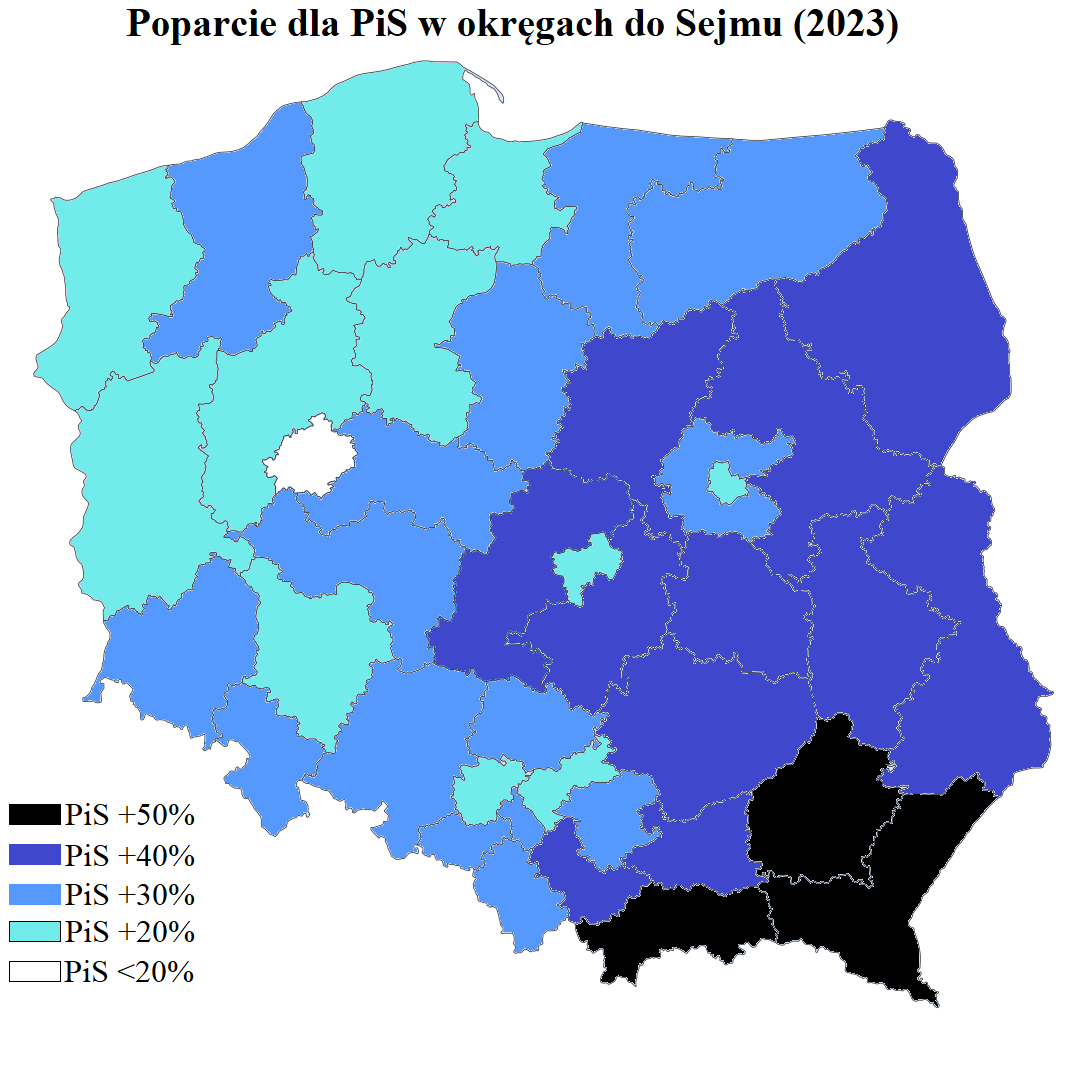
Support for Law and Justice

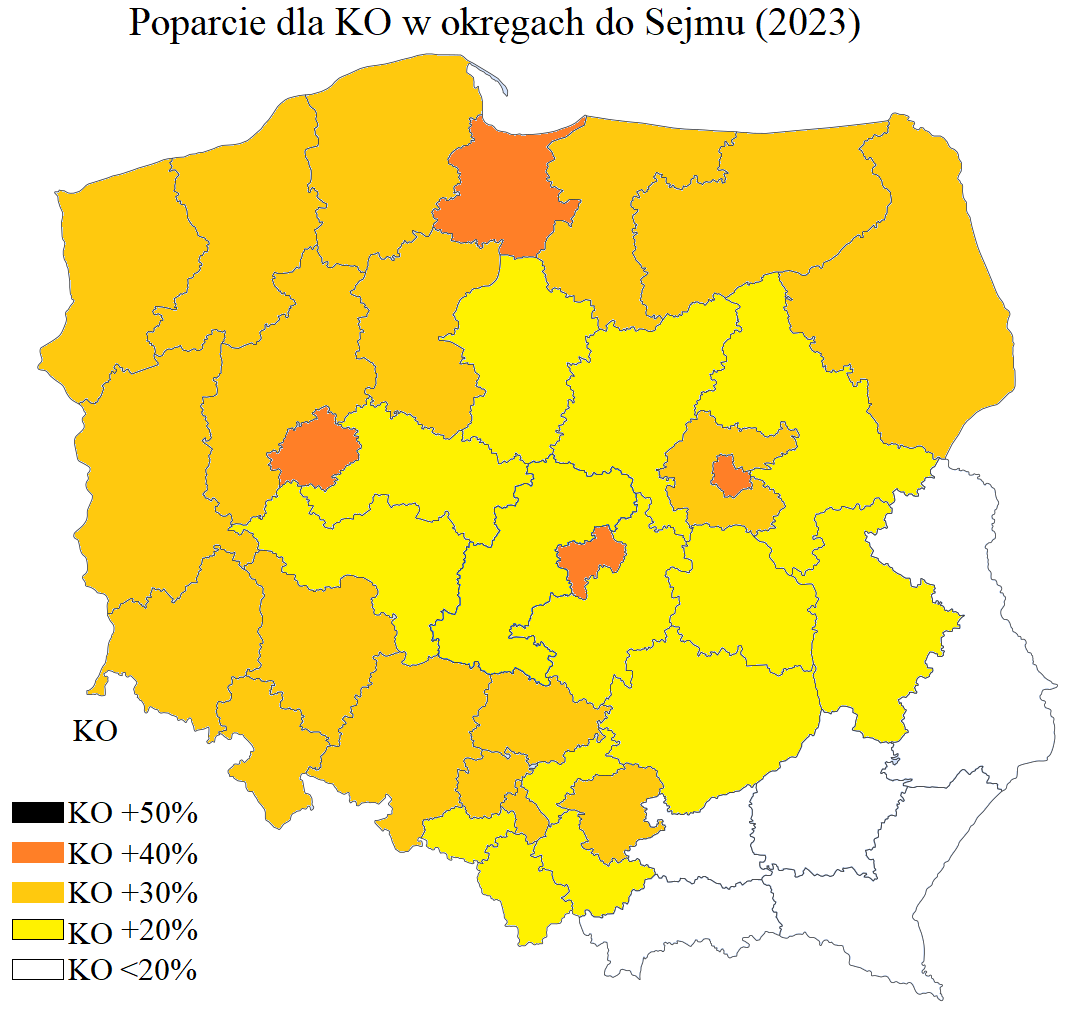
Support of the Civic Coalition

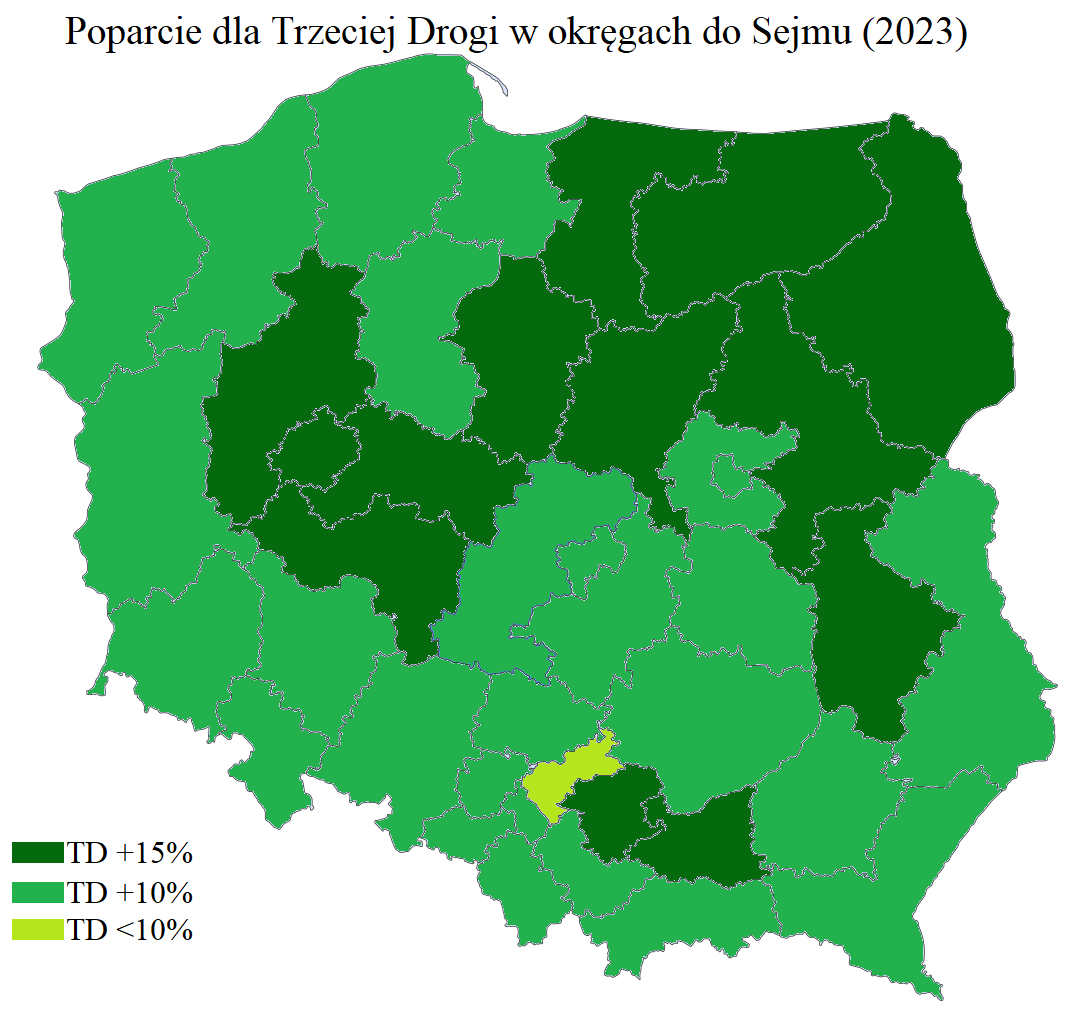
Support for the Third Way

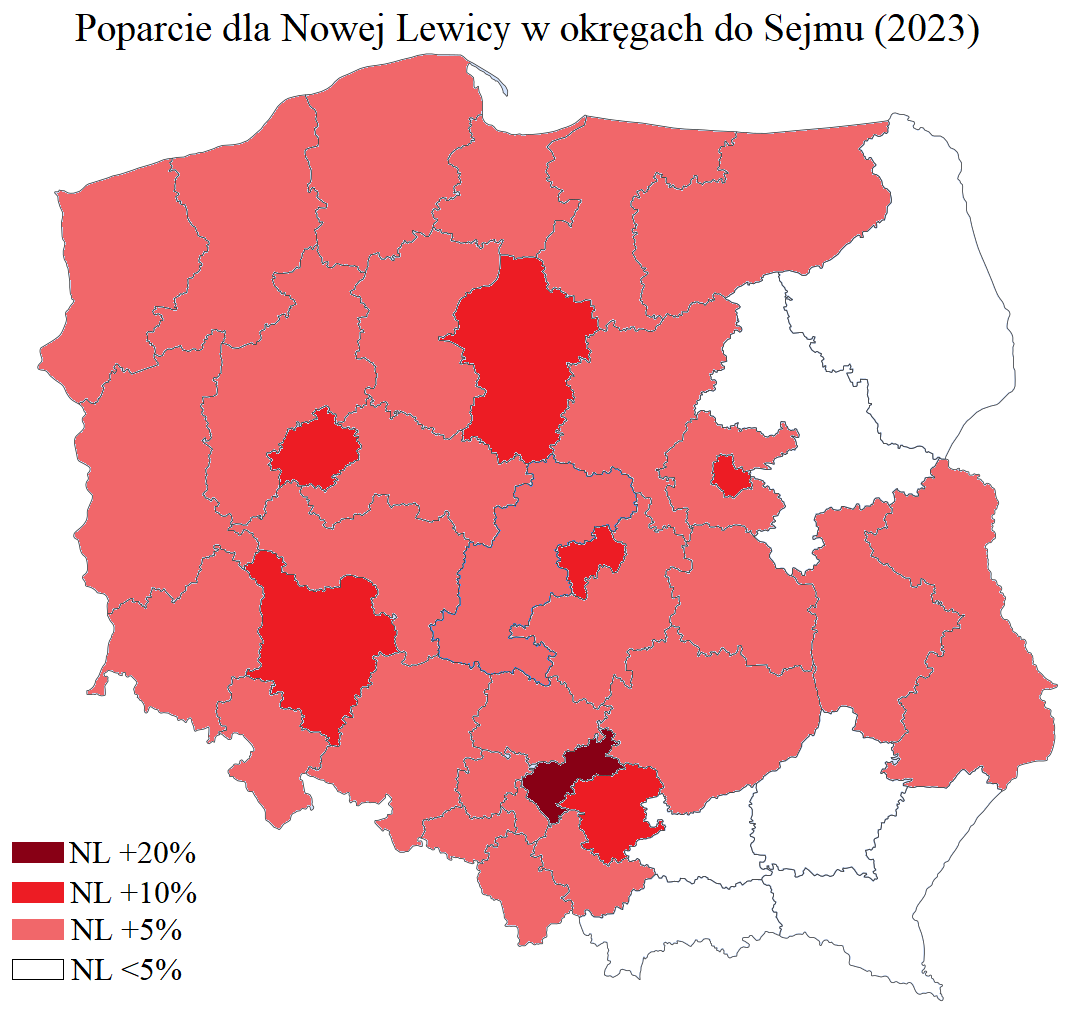
Support of the New Left

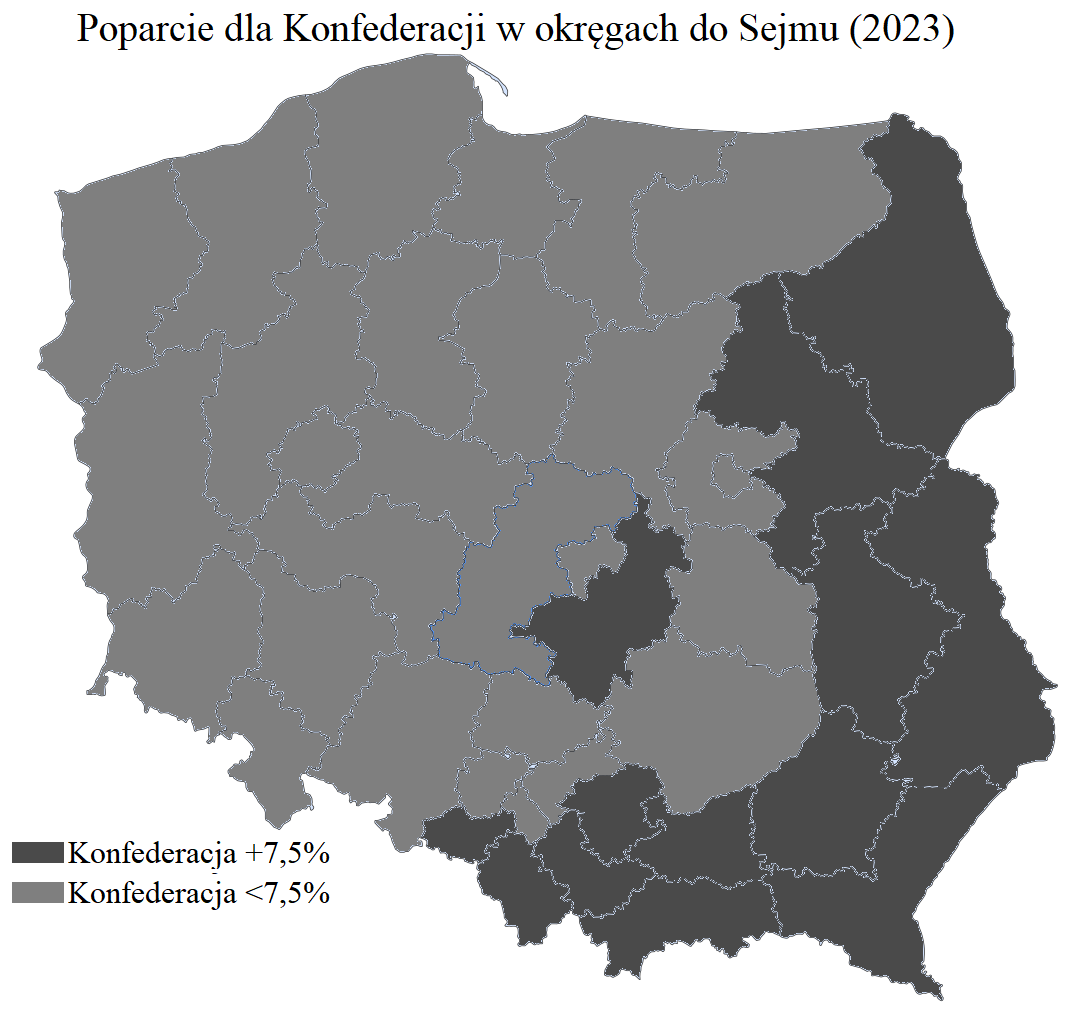
Support for the Confederation of Freedom and Independence

=== Senate ===
Largest electoral alliance in each Senate constituency

Winning party in each Senate constituency

Party or alliance		Votes	%	Seats	+/–
Senate Pact 2023	Civic Coalition	6,187,295	28.91	41	−2
Senate Pact 2023	Third Way	2,462,360	11.50	11	+8
Senate Pact 2023	The Left	1,131,639	5.29	9	+7
Senate Pact 2023	Independents (Note: Wadim Tyszkiewicz, Krzysztof Kwiatkowski, Bogusław Waksmundzki, Krzystof Borkowski, Zygmunt Frankiewicz and Andrzej Dziuba ran as independents officially supported by the Senate Pact. Additionally Wadim Tyszkiewicz is a member of Yes! For Poland.)	573,060	2.68	4	New
Law and Justice		7,449,875	34.81	34	−14
Confederation Liberty and Independence		1,443,836	6.75	0	0
Nonpartisan Local Government Activists		1,049,919	4.91	0	0
New Democracy - Yes		95,691	0.45	0	New
Mirosław Piasecki Candidate for Senator RP		58,102	0.27	0	0
There is One Poland		55,418	0.26	0	New
Union of Christian Families		51,206	0.24	0	New
Silesians Together		50,274	0.23	0	0
Free and Solidary		42,956	0.20	0	New
Civic Agreement		41,592	0.19	0	New
Polska 2050		30,763	0.14	0	New
German Minority Electoral Committee		29,390	0.14	0	0
Polish Pirate Party		27,286	0.13	0	New
Slavic Union		25,802	0.12	0	0
Prosperity and Peace Movement		20,672	0.10	0	New
Repair Poland Movement		15,236	0.07	0	New
United		13,422	0.06	0	New
Wolnościowcy		4,053	0.02	0	New
Normal Country		2,177	0.01	0	0
Independents and other committees with a single candidate		540,974	2.53	1	−3
Total		21,402,998	100.00	100	0
Valid votes		21,402,998	97.53		
Invalid/blank votes		541,886	2.47		
Total votes		21,944,884	100.00		
Registered voters/turnout		29,532,595	74.31		
Source: National Electoral Commission

Vote share
PiS	34.81%
KO (PS)	28.91%
TD (PS)	11.50%
KWiN	6.75%
Lewica (PS)	5.29%
BS	4.91%
Ind. (PS)	2.68%
Ind.	2.53%
Others	2.62%

Seat share
KO (PS) 41	41%
PiS 34	34%
TD (PS) 11	11%
Lewica (PS) 9	9%
Ind. (PS) 4	4%
Ind. 1	1%

==== By bloc ====
Graph of the party split among 100 seats.
Party	Votes	%	Seats	+/–
Senate Pact 2023	10,354,354	48.38	65	+13
Law and Justice	7,449,875	34.81	34	−14
Independent	540,974	2.53	1	−3
Others	3,057,795	14.29	0	–
Total	21,402,998	100.00	100	–

==== Party breakdown ====
size
Party or alliance		Votes	%	Seats	+/–
Civic Coalition	Civic Platform	5,107,360	23.86	36	+2
Civic Coalition	Independents	1,079,935	5.05	5	−4
Civic Coalition	Total	6,187,295	28.91	41	−2
Third Way	Polish People's Party	1,282,952	5.99	4	+2
Third Way	Poland 2050 (Note: Includes 104,047 votes and 1 seat for supported independents.)	726,740	3.40	5	New
Third Way	Union of European Democrats	198,074	0.93	1	0
Third Way	Centre for Poland	177,158	0.83	1	New
Third Way	Independents	77,436	0.36	0	New
Third Way	Total	2,462,360	11.50	11	+8
The Left	New Left	659,650	3.08	5	+4
The Left	Left Together	294,150	1.37	2	New
The Left	Polish Socialist Party	59,980	0.28	1	0
The Left	Labour Union	55,372	0.26	1	+1
The Left	Independents	62,487	0.29	0	New
The Left	Total	1,131,639	5.29	9	+7
Senate Pact independents (Note: Wadim Tyszkiewicz, Krzysztof Kwiatkowski, Bogusław Waksmundzki, Krzystof Borkowski, Zygmunt Frankiewicz and Andrzej Dziuba ran as independents officially supported by the Senate Pact. Additionally Wadim Tyszkiewicz is a member of Yes! For Poland.)		573,060	2.68	4	New
Senate Pact 2023 total		10,354,354	48.38	65	+17
United Right	Law and Justice	6,352,852	29.68	29	−9
United Right	Sovereign Poland	131,649	0.62	1	−1
United Right	The Republicans	64,020	0.30	0	New
United Right	Independents	901,354	4.21	4	−2
United Right	Total	7,449,875	34.81	34	−14
Confederation Liberty and Independence		1,443,836	6.75	0	0
Nonpartisan Local Government Activists		1,049,919	4.91	0	0
New Democracy - Yes		95,691	0.45	0	New
Mirosław Piasecki Candidate for Senator RP		58,102	0.27	0	0
There is One Poland		55,418	0.26	0	New
Union of Christian Families		51,206	0.24	0	New
Silesians Together		50,274	0.23	0	0
Free and Solidary		42,956	0.20	0	New
Civic Agreement		41,592	0.19	0	New
Polska 2050		30,763	0.14	0	New
German Minority Electoral Committee		29,390	0.14	0	0
Polish Pirate Party		27,286	0.13	0	New
Slavic Union		25,802	0.12	0	0
Prosperity and Peace Movement		20,672	0.10	0	New
Repair Poland Movement		15,236	0.07	0	New
United		13,422	0.06	0	New
Wolnościowcy		4,053	0.02	0	New
Normal Country		2,177	0.01	0	0
Independents and other committees with a single candidate		540,974	2.53	1	−3
Total		21,402,998	100.00	100	0
Valid votes		21,402,998	97.53		
Invalid/blank votes		541,886	2.47		
Total votes		21,944,884	100.00		
Registered voters/turnout		29,532,595	74.31		
Source: National Electoral Commission

==== By constituency ====
#	Voivodeship	Commission	#	Result	Elected Member
1	Lower Silesian	Legnica	I	The Left gain from Law and Justice	Waldemar Witkowski
2	Lower Silesian	Legnica	II	Civic Coalition gain from Law and Justice	Marcin Zawiła
3	Lower Silesian	Legnica	III	The Left gain from Law and Justice	Małgorzata Sekuła-Szmajdzińska
4	Lower Silesian	Wałbrzych	I	Civic Coalition hold	Agnieszka Kołacz-Leszczyńska
5	Lower Silesian	Wałbrzych	II	Law and Justice hold	Aleksander Szwed
6	Lower Silesian	Wrocław	I	Third Way gain from Civic Coalition	Kazimierz Michał Ujazdowski
7	Lower Silesian	Wrocław	II	Civic Coalition hold	Grzegorz Schetyna
8	Lower Silesian	Wrocław	III	Civic Coalition hold	Barbara Zdrojewska
9	Kuyavian-Pomeranian	Bydgoszcz	I	Civic Coalition hold	Andrzej Kobiak
10	Kuyavian-Pomeranian	Bydgoszcz	II	Civic Coalition hold	Ryszard Brejza
11	Kuyavian-Pomeranian	Toruń	I	Civic Coalition hold	Tomasz Lenz
12	Kuyavian-Pomeranian	Toruń	II	Third Way hold	Ryszard Bober
13	Kuyavian-Pomeranian	Toruń	III	The Left gain from Law and Justice	Krzysztof Kukucki
14	Lublin	Lublin	I	Law and Justice hold	Stanisław Gogacz
15	Lublin	Lublin	II	Law and Justice hold	Grzegorz Czelej
16	Lublin	Lublin	III	Third Way gain from Civic Coalition	Jacek Trela
17	Lublin	Chełm	I	Law and Justice hold	Grzegorz Bierecki
18	Lublin	Chełm	II	Independent gain from Law and Justice	Józef Zając
19	Lublin	Chełm	III	Law and Justice hold	Jerzy Chróścikowski
20	Lubusz	Zielona Góra	I	Third Way gain from Civic Coalition	Mirosław Różański
21	Lubusz	Zielona Góra	II	Civic Coalition hold	Władysław Komarnicki
22	Lubusz	Zielona Góra	III	Senate Pact independent hold	Wadim Tyszkiewicz
23	Łódź	Łódź	I	Civic Coalition hold	Artur Dunin
24	Łódź	Łódź	II	Senate Pact independent hold	Krzysztof Kwiatkowski
25	Łódź	Sieradz	I	Law and Justice hold	Przemysław Błaszczyk
26	Łódź	Sieradz	II	The Left gain from Law and Justice	Marcin Karpiński
27	Łódź	Sieradz	III	Law and Justice hold	Michał Seweryński
28	Łódź	Piotrków Trybunalski	I	Law and Justice hold	Wiesław Dobkowski
29	Łódź	Piotrków Trybunalski	II	Law and Justice hold	Rafał Ambrozik
30	Lesser Poland	Kraków	I	Law and Justice hold	Andrzej Pająk
31	Lesser Poland	Kraków	II	Law and Justice hold	Marek Pęk
32	Lesser Poland	Kraków	III	Civic Coalition hold	Jerzy Fedorowicz
33	Lesser Poland	Kraków	IV	Civic Coalition hold	Bogdan Klich
34	Lesser Poland	Tarnów	I	Law and Justice hold	Włodzimierz Bernacki
35	Lesser Poland	Tarnów	II	Law and Justice hold	Kazimierz Wiatr
36	Lesser Poland	Nowy Sącz	I	Law and Justice hold	Jan Hamerski
37	Lesser Poland	Nowy Sącz	II	Law and Justice hold	Wiktor Durlak
38	Masovian	Płock	I	Third Way gain from Law and Justice	Waldemar Pawlak
39	Masovian	Płock	II	Law and Justice hold	Krzysztof Bieńkowski
40	Masovian	Warszawa	I	Civic Coalition hold	Jolanta Hibner
41	Masovian	Warszawa	II	Third Way hold	Michał Kamiński
42	Masovian	Warszawa	III	Civic Coalition hold	Marek Borowski
43	Masovian	Warszawa	IV	Civic Coalition hold	Małgorzata Kidawa-Błońska
44	Masovian	Warszawa	V	Civic Coalition hold	Adam Bodnar
45	Masovian	Warszawa	VI	The Left gain from Civic Coalition	Magdalena Biejat
46	Masovian	Siedlce	I	Law and Justice hold	Robert Mamątow
47	Masovian	Siedlce	II	Law and Justice hold	Maciej Górski
48	Masovian	Siedlce	III	Law and Justice hold	Waldemar Kraska
49	Masovian	Radom	I	Law and Justice hold	Stanisław Karczewski
50	Masovian	Radom	II	Law and Justice hold	Wojciech Skurkiewicz
51	Opole	Opole	I	Civic Coalition gain from Law and Justice	Tadeusz Jarmuziewicz
52	Opole	Opole	II	The Left gain from Civic Coalition	Piotr Woźniak
53	Opole	Opole	III	Civic Coalition hold	Beniamin Godyla
54	Subcarpathian	Rzeszów	I	Law and Justice hold	Janina Sagatowska
55	Subcarpathian	Rzeszów	II	Law and Justice hold	Zdzisław Pupa
56	Subcarpathian	Rzeszów	III	Law and Justice hold	Józef Jodłowski
57	Subcarpathian	Krosno	I	Law and Justice hold	Alicja Zając
58	Subcarpathian	Krosno	II	Law and Justice hold	Mieczysław Golba
59	Podlaskie	Białystok	I	Law and Justice hold	Marek Komorowski
60	Podlaskie	Białystok	II	Third Way gain from Law and Justice	Maciej Żywno
61	Podlaskie	Białystok	III	Law and Justice hold	Anna Bogucka-Skowrońska
62	Pomeranian	Słupsk	I	Civic Coalition hold	Kazimierz Kleina
63	Pomeranian	Słupsk	II	The Left gain from Civic Coalition	Anna Górska
64	Pomeranian	Słupsk	III	Civic Coalition hold	Sławomir Rybicki
65	Pomeranian	Gdańsk	I	Civic Coalition hold	Bogdan Borusewicz
66	Pomeranian	Gdańsk	II	Civic Coalition hold	Ryszard Świlski
67	Pomeranian	Gdańsk	III	Civic Coalition hold	Leszek Czarnobaj
68	Silesian	Częstochowa	I	Law and Justice hold	Ryszard Majer
69	Silesian	Częstochowa	II	The Left hold	Wojciech Konieczny
70	Silesian	Katowice	I	Senate Pact independent gain from Civic Coalition	Zygmunt Frankiewicz
71	Silesian	Katowice	II	Civic Coalition hold	Halina Bieda
72	Silesian	Bielsko-Biała	I	Civic Coalition gain from Law and Justice	Henryk Siedlaczek
73	Silesian	Bielsko-Biała	II	Third Way gain from Law and Justice	Piotr Masłowski
74	Silesian	Katowice	III	Civic Coalition gain from Law and Justice	Gabriela Morawska-Stanecka
75	Silesian	Katowice	IV	Senate Pact independent gain from Civic Coalition	Andrzej Dziuba
76	Silesian	Katowice	V	Civic Coalition hold	Beata Małecka-Libera
77	Silesian	Katowice	VI	Civic Coalition hold	Joanna Sekuła
78	Silesian	Bielsko-Biała	III	Civic Coalition hold	Agnieszka Gorgoń-Komor
79	Silesian	Bielsko-Biała	IV	Law and Justice hold	Andrzej Kalata
80	Silesian	Katowice	VII	The Left gain from Civic Coalition	Maciej Kopiec
81	Świętokrzyskie	Kielce	I	Law and Justice hold	Jacek Włosowicz
82	Świętokrzyskie	Kielce	II	Law and Justice hold	Jarosław Rusiecki
83	Świętokrzyskie	Kielce	III	Law and Justice hold	Krzysztof Słoń
84	Warmian-Masurian	Elbląg	I	Civic Coalition hold	Jerzy Wcisła
85	Warmian-Masurian	Elbląg	II	Third Way gain from Law and Justice	Gustaw Marek Brzezin
86	Warmian-Masurian	Olsztyn	I	Civic Coalition gain from Independent	Ewa Kaliszuk
87	Warmian-Masurian	Olsztyn	II	Civic Coalition gain from Law and Justice	Jolanta Piotrowska
88	Greater Poland	Piła	I	Civic Coalition hold	Adam Szejnfeld
89	Greater Poland	Piła	II	Third Way hold	Jan Filip Libicki
90	Greater Poland	Poznań	I	Civic Coalition hold	Waldy Dzikowski
91	Greater Poland	Poznań	II	Civic Coalition hold	Rafał Grupiński
92	Greater Poland	Konin	I	Third Way gain from Civic Coalition	Grzegorz Fedorowicz
93	Greater Poland	Konin	II	Law and Justice hold	Leszek Galemba
94	Greater Poland	Kalisz	I	Civic Coalition hold	Wojciech Ziemniak
95	Greater Poland	Kalisz	II	Civic Coalition hold	Ewa Matecka
96	Greater Poland	Kalisz	III	Civic Coalition hold	Janusz Pęcherz
97	West Pomeranian	Szczecin	I	Civic Coalition hold	Tomasz Grodzki
98	West Pomeranian	Szczecin	II	Civic Coalition hold	Magdalena Kochan
99	West Pomeranian	Koszalin	I	Civic Coalition hold	Janusz Gromek
100	West Pomeranian	Koszalin	II	Civic Coalition gain from Independent	Stanisław Gawłowski
Source: National Electoral Commission

== Electorate demographics ==
Demographic	Turnout	Law and Justice	Civic Coalition	Third Way	The Left	Confederation	Nonpartisan Local Government Activists	There is One Poland	Others
Total vote	73.9%	36.1%	31.0%	14.0%	8.6%	6.8%	2.0%	1.3%	0.2%
Sex
Men	73.1%	36.3%	29.4%	13.9%	6.8%	10.2%	2.0%	1.2%	0.2%
Women	74.7%	35.9%	32.5%	14.1%	10.1%	3.7%	2.1%	1.4%	0.2%
Age
18–29 years old	70.9%	14.4%	27.6%	17.9%	17.4%	17.8%	3.5%	1.2%	0.2%
30–39 years old	73.9%	25.7%	28.8%	18.3%	10.4%	11.8%	3.0%	1.7%	0.3%
40–49 years old	80.5%	31.6%	34.5%	16.5%	8.1%	5.2%	2.2%	1.7%	0.2%
50–59 years old	84.4%	43.7%	32.3%	12.9%	5.1%	3.2%	1.5%	1.2%	0.1%
60 or older	66.5%	52.8%	31.0%	8.2%	5.2%	1.1%	0.8%	0.8%	0.1%
Occupation
Company owner	n/a	20.3%	42.2%	15.9%	7.4%	10.9%	1.6%	1.5%	0.2%
Manager/expert	n/a	18.4%	40.4%	19.2%	11.3%	7.3%	2.0%	1.2%	0.2%
Admin/services	n/a	29.2%	31.6%	17.2%	10.7%	7.1%	2.5%	1.5%	0.2%
Farmer	n/a	66.6%	9.5%	11.5%	3.0%	5.3%	2.2%	1.5%	0.4%
Worker	n/a	49.6%	19.8%	11.1%	5.1%	9.6%	3.1%	1.5%	0.2%
Student	n/a	11.0%	31.0%	18.6%	21.6%	13.4%	3.1%	1.1%	0.2%
Unemployed	n/a	45.2%	21.4%	11.8%	7.7%	9.0%	3.1%	1.5%	0.3%
Retired	n/a	53.4%	30.6%	7.8%	5.5%	1.1%	0.8%	0.7%	0.1%
Others	n/a	34.7%	27.4%	15.8%	8.9%	8.5%	2.9%	1.6%	0.2%
Agglomeration
Rural	70.3%	47.6%	21.2%	13.4%	5.9%	7.8%	2.4%	1.4%	0.3%
<50,000 pop.	74.1%	33.7%	33.4%	14.7%	8.3%	6.5%	2.1%	1.2%	0.1%
51,000 - 200,000 pop.	73.9%	29.7%	36.7%	13.8%	9.9%	6.4%	1.8%	1.5%	0.2%
201,000 – 500,000 pop.	82.6%	23.9%	41.4%	15.8%	10.7%	5.4%	1.8%	0.8%	0.2%
>500,000 pop.	81.2%	21.1%	42.9%	14.0%	14.5%	5.5%	1.3%	0.7%	0.0%
Education
Elementary	n/a	62.6%	15.4%	7.7%	4.7%	6.1%	2.5%	0.8%	0.2%
Vocational	n/a	61.5%	18.1%	8.3%	4.2%	4.6%	2.1%	1.0%	0.2%
Secondary	n/a	37.7%	29.9%	13.0%	8.1%	7.7%	2.2%	1.2%	0.2%
Higher	n/a	22.2%	38.6%	17.8%	11.1%	6.8%	1.8%	1.5%	0.2%
Sejm vote in 2019
Law and Justice	n/a	87.7%	2.0%	3.5%	1.1%	2.8%	1.4%	1.4%	0.1%
Civic Coalition	n/a	1.0%	73.6%	16.1%	7.2%	1.1%	0.7%	0.2%	0.1%
The Left	n/a	2.3%	23.1%	14.1%	57.3%	1.0%	1.7%	0.4%	0.1%
Polish Coalition	n/a	14.1%	14.1%	57.8%	7.0%	2.7%	3.3%	1.0%	0.0%
Confederation	n/a	6.8%	8.9%	11.1%	3.0%	63.3%	3.4%	3.1%	0.4%
Others	n/a	6.7%	19.0%	36.2%	17.8%	6.6%	7.7%	4.5%	1.5%
Didn't vote	n/a	14.7%	27.1%	18.7%	13.3%	19.8%	4.0%	1.8%	0.6%
Don't remember	n/a	20.9%	26.1%	24.6%	12.4%	8.8%	4.3%	2.3%	0.6%
Second-round president vote in 2020
Andrzej Duda	n/a	81.4%	2.7%	4.7%	1.5%	6.0%	1.8%	1.8%	0.1%
Rafał Trzaskowski	n/a	1.4%	60.7%	19.8%	13.7%	2.8%	1.1%	0.3%	0.2%
Didn't vote	n/a	14.7%	27.1%	18.7%	13.3%	19.8%	4.0%	1.8%	0.6%
Don't remember	n/a	20.9%	26.1%	24.6%	12.4%	8.8%	4.3%	2.3%	0.6%
Source: Ipsos

== Analysis ==
Turnout was 74.7% among women and 73.1% among men, with both giving similar levels of support for the government and two leading opposition parties, Civic Coalition and Third Way. Analysts identified a "youthquake" in which voting by Poland's young voters had a disproportionate impact on the election outcome. Turnout for ages 18–29 reached 68.8%, compared to 46.4% in the previous elections of 2019; among these voters, support for the ruling party fell to 14.9% from 26.3% four years earlier.

== Aftermath ==
2023 Polish government formation
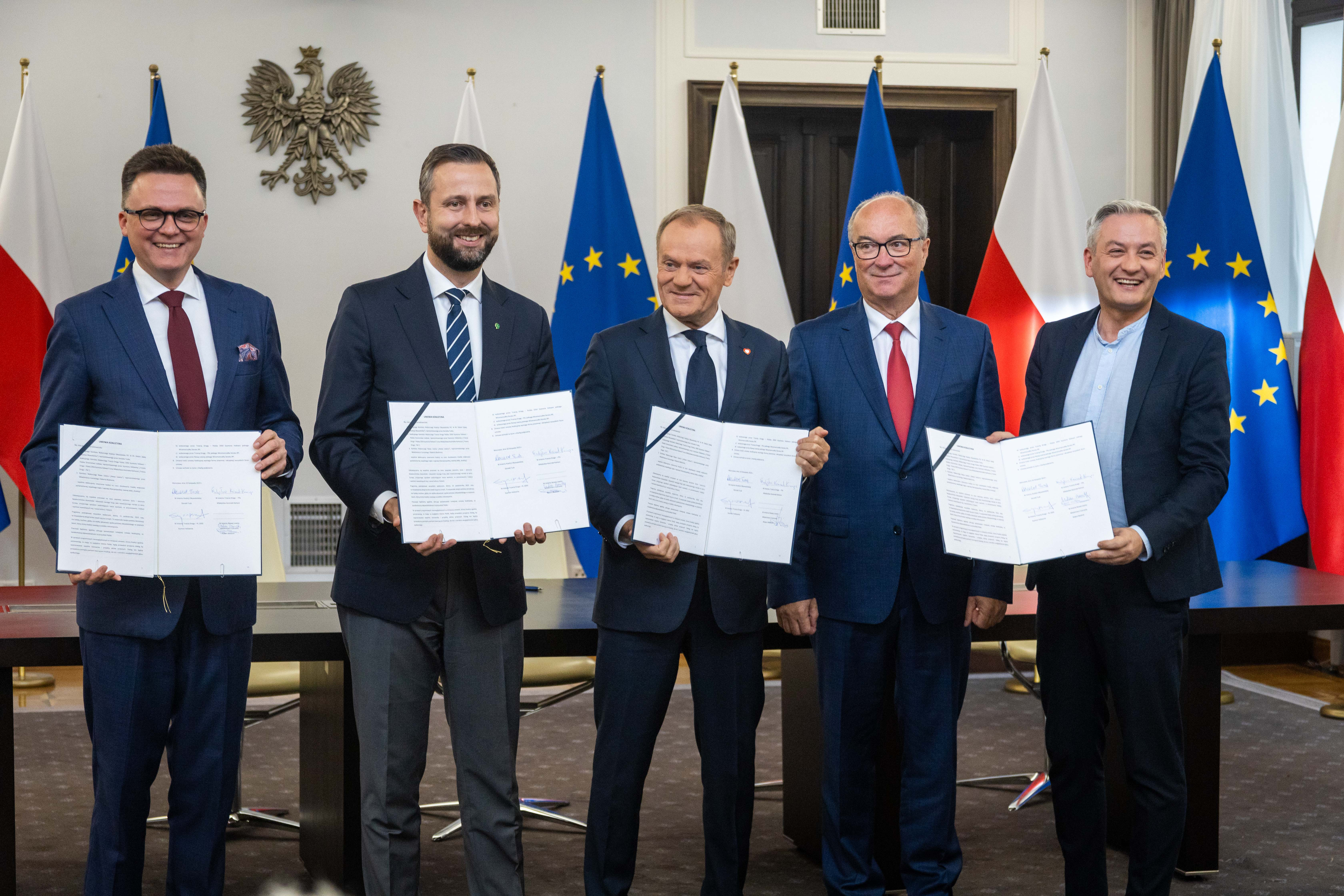
- Leaders of the three opposition parties after signing the coalition agreement.
- Date: 24 October 2023 – 13 December 2023
- Location: Poland
- Type: Parliamentary government formation
- Cause: 2023 Polish parliamentary election
- Participants: PiS, KO, TD (PSL, PL2050), Lewica
- Outcome: President Andrzej Duda designates Mateusz Morawiecki as Prime Minister and appoints the Third Morawiecki Cabinet; The Morawiecki cabinet fails a vote of confidence in the Sejm; The Sejm nominates Donald Tusk as its candidate for Prime Minister and passes a vote of confidence in his proposed cabinet; Formation of the Third Tusk Cabinet, which President Duda swears in

President Andrzej Duda later announced that he would hold consultations separately with every parliamentary party leader on 24 and 25 October. On 24 October, leaders of the Civic Coalition, the Polish People's Party, Poland 2050, and The Left stated they are ready to form a government with Donald Tusk as their candidate for prime minister. However, Duda had a maximum of 30 days to call parliament into session, especially if he wanted the ruling Law and Justice party to try to build a government. Opposition parties had called on Duda to allow them to form a government as soon as possible and respect the will of the voters. Representatives of Duda stated that he would do so within the timeframe that the Constitution demands and allows.

On 6 November, Duda named Law and Justice's incumbent prime minister Mateusz Morawiecki as his prime ministerial nominee. This move was criticized by the opposition, as the United Right was 40 seats short of a majority and no other bloc had agreed to join them for coalition talks.

On 10 November, Civic Coalition, Poland 2050, Polish People's Party and New Left signed a coalition agreement with Tusk as their candidate for prime minister. The opposition parties wanted to sign the agreement before the Sejm's first sitting in order to show that they stood ready to govern. Morawiecki was required to secure the Sejm's confidence within two weeks of being sworn in. Under the Constitution, if Morawiecki failed to do so, the Sejm would then designate its own candidate for prime minister, and Duda would be required to appoint that candidate before 11 December. Most commentators expected Morawiecki to come up short of the support needed to govern, as no other party willing to go into coalition with PiS would give it enough support to command the confidence of the Sejm.

On 13 November, the newly elected Sejm held its first session. Szymon Hołownia, leader of Poland 2050, was elected Marshal of the Sejm, winning over the incumbent Elżbieta Witek of PiS. Later that day, on the first meeting of the Senate, former Marshal of the Sejm Małgorzata Kidawa-Błońska of Civic Coalition was elected Marshal of the Senate.

On 27 November, Mateusz Morawiecki was sworn in by President Duda for an unprecedented third term as Prime Minister. His cabinet had been mockingly dubbed the "Two Weeks Government" by Polish media due to its low likelihood of passing the confidence vote. Though the far-right Confederation Liberty and Independence had been suggested by commentators as a potential coalition partner, Krzysztof Bosak, leader of the Confederation component National Movement, told Politico Europe that "there is no chance" of Confederation supporting a PiS government. Even had Confederation supported PiS, the United Right would have still been well short of a majority in the Sejm. Former prime minister Leszek Miller joked that the Morawiecki government would not survive even as long as a house fly, saying on Twitter that "Morawiecki's government will not even have time to pupate, let alone lay eggs."

On 11 December, Morawiecki's caretaker cabinet lost a vote of confidence in the Sejm by 190 votes to 266. Later that day, the Sejm nominated Tusk for prime minister, who was subsequently confirmed by 248 votes in favour and 201 against. Tusk's cabinet was sworn in on 13 December.
