= Kaliszuk =

Kaliszuk (Polish: [kaˈli.ʂuk]) is a Polish surname. Notable people with the surname include:

- Ewa Kaliszuk (born 1975), Polish politician
- Tamara Kaliszuk (born 1990), Polish volleyball player
