= Senate Constituency no. 42 =

Parliamentary constituency in Poland

- Okręg wyborczy nr 42
- Constituency for the Senate of Poland
- Location within Poland.
- Districts of Warsaw: Praga-Południe, Praga-Północ, Rembertów, Targówek, Wesoła
- Voivodeship: Masovian
- Population: 421,472 (June 2023)
- Electorate: 317,867 (2023)
- Area: 100.26 km^{2} (38.71 sq mi)

Current constituency
- Created: 2011
- Party: Civic Platform
- Senator: Marek Borowski
- Sejm constituency: 19 (Warsaw I)
- EP constituency: Warsaw

Senate Constituency no. 42 (Polish: Okręg wyborczy nr 42 do Senatu) is a single-member constituency for the Senate of Poland comprising five districts of the city of Warsaw: Praga-Południe, Praga-Północ, Rembertów, Targówek, Wesoła. The incumbent senator is Marek Borowski (Civic Platform) elected in 2023 parliamentary election. He has held the seat for four terms in a row since the constituency was established in 2011.

== List of senators ==
Election	Senator	Party
2011	Marek Borowski	Independent
2015	Marek Borowski	Independent
2019	Marek Borowski	Civic Platform
2023	Marek Borowski	Civic Platform

== Election results ==
=== 2011 ===
Candidate	Party	Votes	%
Marek Borowski	Independent (Note: Marek Borowski's Voters' Electoral Committee)	104,238	50.26
Zbigniew Romaszewski	Law and Justice	59,153	28.52
Krzysztof Rybiński	Independent (Note: Union of Mayors – Citizines to the Senate Voters' Electoral Committee)	33,665	16.23
Radosław Paweł Piesiewicz	Independent (Note: Independent Candidate for the Senator Radosław Piesiewicz's Voters' Electoral Committee)	10,361	5.00
Total		207,417	100.00
Valid votes		207,417	96.14
Invalid/blank votes		8,333	3.86
Total votes		215,750	100.00
Registered voters/turnout		335,504	64.31
Source: National Electoral Commission

=== 2015 ===
Candidate	Party	Votes	%	+/–
Marek Borowski	Independent	124,064	60.69	+10.43
Piotr Łukasz Andrzejewski	Law and Justice	80,356	39.31	New
Total		204,420	100.00	–
Valid votes		204,420	95.47	
Invalid/blank votes		9,709	4.53	
Total votes		214,129	100.00	
Registered voters/turnout		328,804	65.12	+0.81
Source: National Electoral Commission

=== 2019 ===
Candidate	Party	Votes	%	+/–
Marek Borowski	Civic Platform	153,994	64.55	+3.86
Cezary Andrzej Jurkiewicz	Law and Justice	84,557	35.45	New
Total		238,551	100.00	–
Valid votes		238,551	97.21	
Invalid/blank votes		6,838	2.79	
Total votes		245,389	100.00	
Registered voters/turnout		329,530	74.47	+9.35
Source: National Electoral Commission

=== 2023 ===
Candidate	Party	Votes	%	+/–
Marek Borowski	Civic Platform	178,104	69.72	+5.17
Wojciech Jakub Zabłocki	Law and Justice	77,370	30.28	New
Total		255,474	100.00	–
Valid votes		255,474	97.23	
Invalid/blank votes		7,267	2.77	
Total votes		262,741	100.00	
Registered voters/turnout		317,867	82.66	+8.19
Source: National Electoral Commission
