= Pensioners' Party =

Pensioners' Party or Party of Pensioners is a name commonly adopted by political organizations composed primarily of people who have a pension (generally elderly retirees) and who are interested in issues affecting their demographic group. However, while some political parties appeal predominantly or significantly to elderly voters in terms of their demographic appeal, they may not be formally designated as a 'pensioners party'. Several populist, social conservative and nationalist parties within Western Europe, as well as New Zealand First, possess such attributes.

Political parties that are known by this title include:

- Croatian Party of Pensioners
- Democratic Party of Pensioners of Slovenia
- Dor (political party), a political party in Israel
- Party of Pensioners (Croatia), a political party in Croatia
- Party of Pensioners (North Macedonia)
- Party of Pensioners of Ukraine
- Pensioner Party of Australia
- Pensioners Party (England)
- Pensioners Party (Norway)
- Pensioners Party (Scotland)
- Pensioners' Party (Hungary)
- Pensioners' Party (Italy)
- Pensioners' Party of Bosnia and Herzegovina
- Pensioners' Party of the Republika Srpska
- Russian Party of Pensioners for Social Justice
