= Tadeusz Jarmuziewicz =

Polish politician (born 1957)

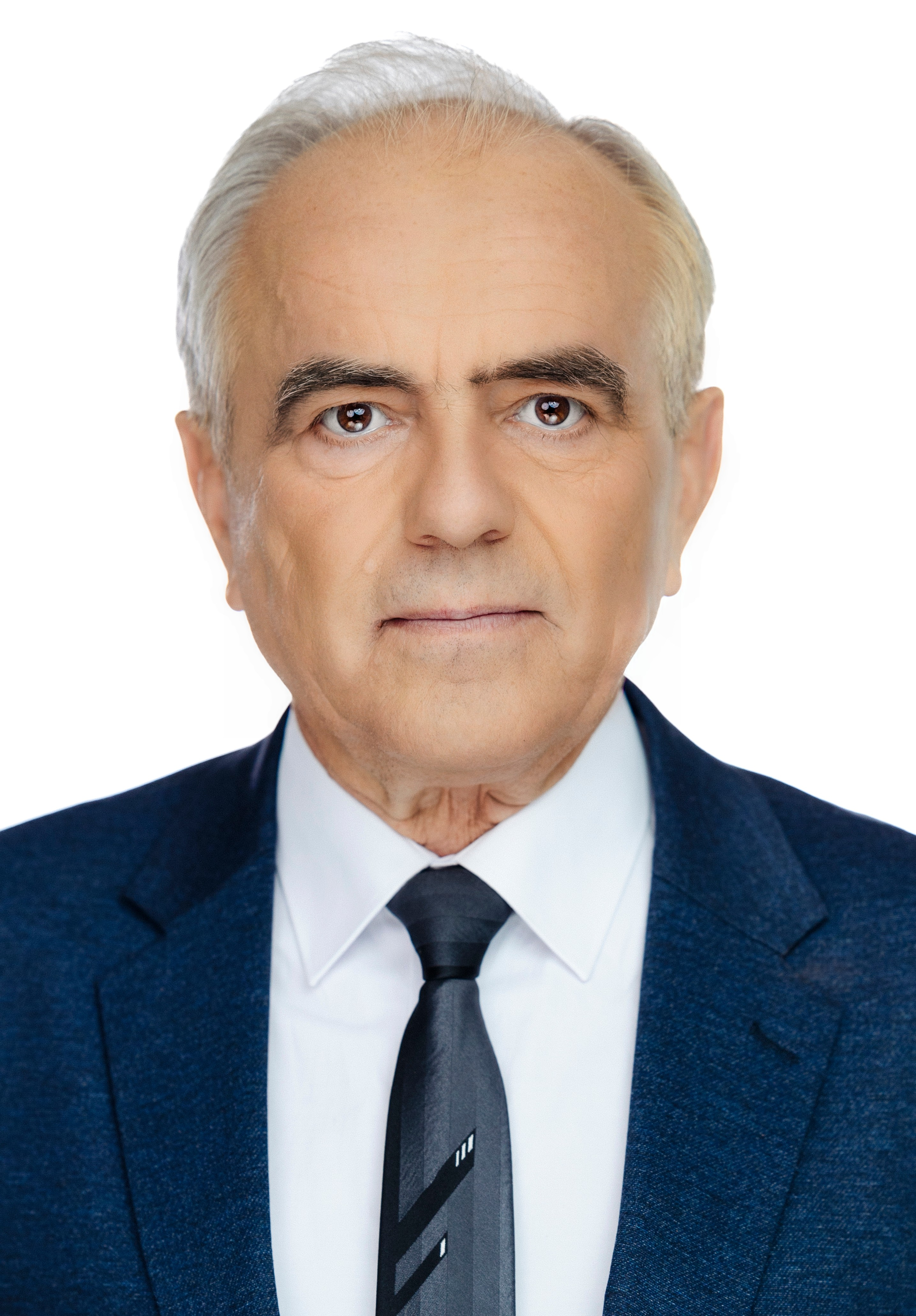

Member of the Senate
- Incumbent
- Assumed office 13 November 2023
- Constituency: 51st

Deputy of the Sejm
- In office 20 October 1997 – 11 November 2015
- Constituency: 21 Opole (2001-2015); 30 Opole (1997-2001)

Personal details
- Born: 21 September 1951 (age 74) Piława Górna, Poland
- Party: Civic Platform
- Other political affiliations: Freedom Union (1997-2001)

Tadeusz Jarmuziewicz (born 21 September 1957 in Piława Górna) is a Polish politician. He was elected to the Sejm on 25 September 2005, getting 9635 votes in 21 Opole district as a candidate from the Civic Platform list.

He was a deputy of the third through seventh terms of the Sejm. In 2023 he was elected to the Senate.

== See also ==
- Members of Polish Sejm 2005-2007
