= Wadim Tyszkiewicz =

Polish politician (born 1958)

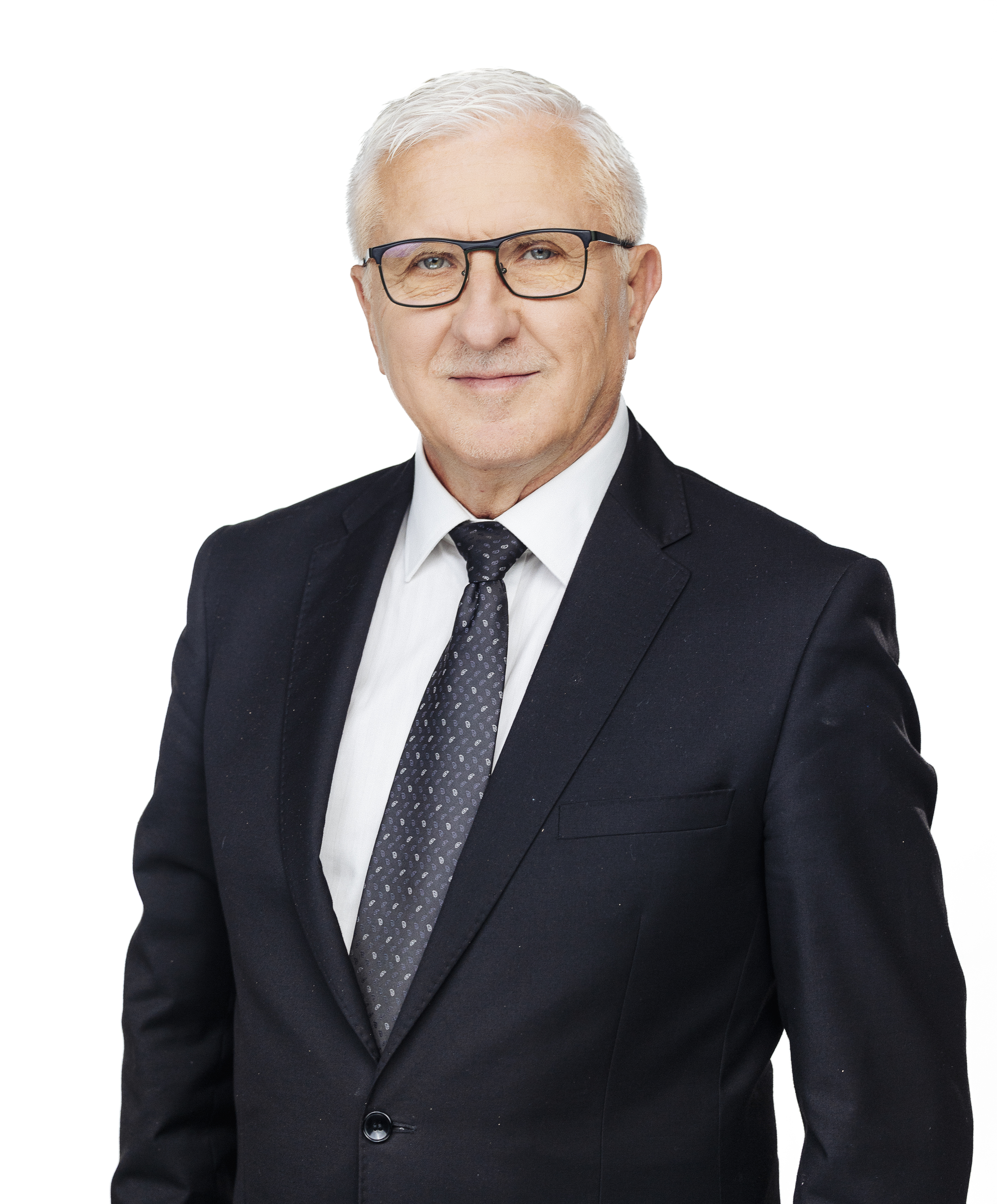
Wadim Tyszkiewicz

Wadim Tyszkiewicz (born 15 November 1958) is a Polish politician. He was elected to the Senate of Poland (10th term) representing the constituency of Zielona Góra. Despite announcing a retirement from politics in early June 2025, he instead created the New Poland political party a few weeks later.
