= Ewa Kaliszuk =

Polish politician and schoolteacher (born 1975)

- Kaliszuk in 2023.

Member of the Senate of Poland
- Incumbent
- Assumed office 13 November 2023
- Constituency: No. 86

Deputy mayor of Olsztyn
- In office 23 February 2019 – 31 October 2023 Serving with Ryszard Kuć (until 2022), Halina Zaborowska-Boruch (until 2022), Justyna Sarna-Pezowicz (since 2022) and Grzegorz Wieczorek (since 2022)
- Tertiary deputy mayor (2019–2022); Prime deputy mayor (2022–2023)
- Preceded by: Ryszard Kuć; Jarosław Słoma
- Succeeded by: Sylwia Rembiszewska-Piątek

Personal details
- Born: 3 July 1975 (age 51) Olsztyn, Poland
- Party: Civic Coalition (since 2025)
- Other political affiliations: Civic Platform (until 2025)
- Children: 1
- Education: University of Warmia and Masuria; Varsovia University of Business and Applied Sciences
- Occupation: Politician, schoolteacher

Ewa Monika Kaliszuk (Polish: [ˈɛ.va mɔˈɲi.ka kaˈli.ʂuk]; born 3 July 1975) is a Polish politician and schoolteacher. Since 2023, she is a member of the Senate of Poland, representing the constituency no. 86, centered on the city of Olsztyn in the Warmian–Masurian Voivodeship. From 2019 to 2023, she was a deputy mayor of Olsztyn. Prior to her political career, she worked as a school teacher and was a headteacher of a vocational school in Olsztyn.

== Biography ==
Ewa Kaliszuk was born on 3 July 1975 in the city of Olsztyn, located in Warmian–Masurian Voivodeship, Poland, as daughter of Monika and Romuald Kaliszuk. She is a sister of actor Marek Kaliszuk.

Kaliszuk graduated from the University of Warmia and Masuria in Olsztyn with a degree in German studies. In 2011, she received a post-graduate degree in organisation and management of education, and in 2022, Kaliszuk received a master of business administration degree from the Varsovia University of Business and Applied Sciences in Warsaw. She worked as a teacher in a primary, secondary and vocation schools in Olsztyn. In 2009, Kaliszuk was promoted to a chartered teacher, the highest level of professional advancement in the Polish education system. From 2014 to 2019, she was a headteacher of the Tadeusz Kościuszko Mechanical and Energy Engineering School Complex in Olsztyn. Kaliszuk was a member of the All-Poland Council of the Vocational School Headteachers under the Minister of National Education from 4 January 2018 to 11 February 2019, and a member of the Voivodeship Council of Vocational School Headteachers under the superintendent of the Warmian–Masurian Voivodeship from 24 September 2018 to 22 February 2019. Kaliszuk also created over 100 educational programmes and materials, and works as a Theory of constraints critical thinking coach.

Kaliszuk was a member of the Civic Platform party. In the 2014 election, she unsuccessfully run to a seat in the Olsztyn City Council, from the constituency no. 1, receiving 108 votes (0.81%). On 23 February 2019, Kaliszuk was appointed as a tertiary deputy mayor of Olsztyn, replacing Jarosław Słoma, responsible for culture, education, and sports, serving under mayor Piotr Grzymowicz. She was promoted to a prime deputy mayor on 12 May 2022. Kaliszuk served until 31 October 2023.

In the 2023 election, Kaliszuk was elected to the Senate of Poland, from the constituency no. 86, centered on Olsztyn. She run on an electoral list of the Civic Coalition electoral alliance, and as a part of the informal alliance of the Senate Pact 2023, receiving 93,766 votes (43.78%). In October 2025, the Civic Platform merged with other parties, forming the Civic Coalition.

== Personal life ==
Kaliszuk has a daughter, Anna. She resides in the city of Olsztyn in Warmian–Masurian Voivodeship, Poland. Kaliszuk is a soloist in the Warmia Song and Dance Ensemble, a folk music and dance group based in Olsztyn.

== Awards and decorations ==
- Honorary Badge to Meritorious to Culture of Poland (2014)

== Electoral results ==
Year	Office		Party	Constituency	Votes			Result	Ref.
Year	Office		Party	Constituency	Total	%	P.	Result	Ref.
2014	Olsztyn City Council	7th	Civic Platform	No. 1	108	0.81	30th	Lost	
2023	Senate of Poland	11th	Civic Coalition	No. 86	93,766	43.78	1st	Won	
