= 2020 Polish presidential election =

- 28 June 2020 (first round); 12 July 2020 (second round)
- Turnout: 64.51% (first round) ▲15.55pp 68.18% (second round) ▲12.84pp
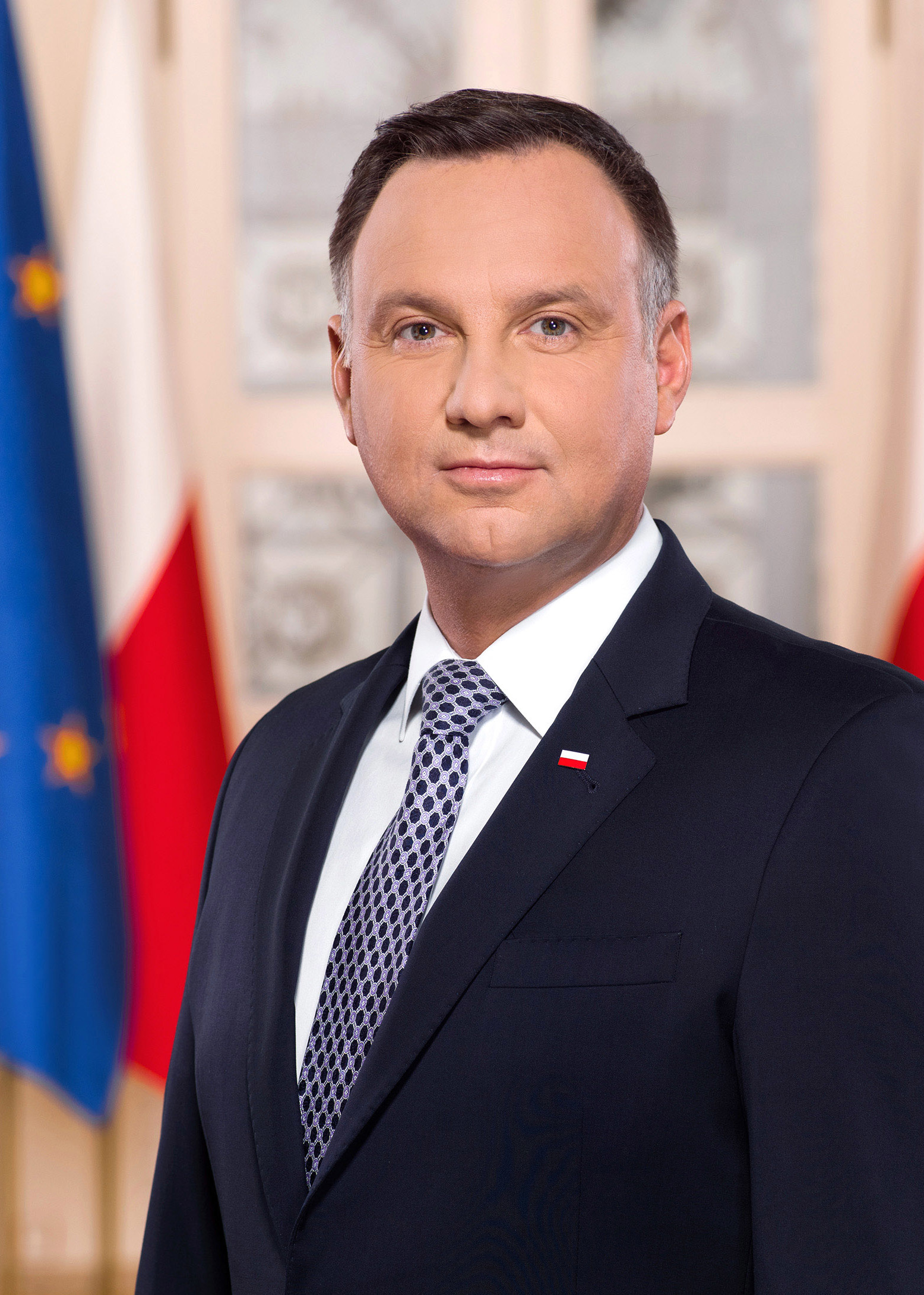

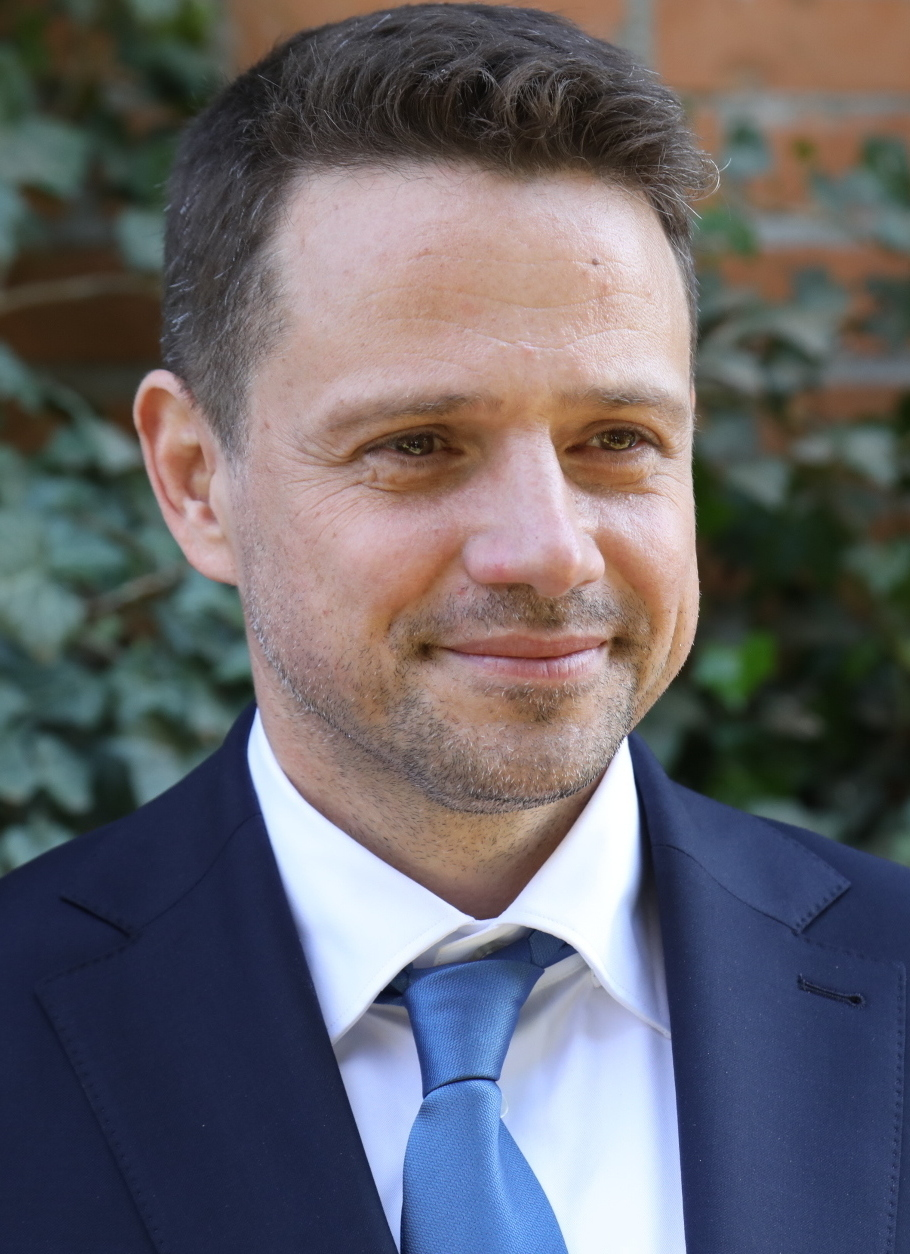
Nominee	Andrzej Duda	Rafał Trzaskowski (replacing Małgorzata Kidawa-Błońska) (Note: Małgorzata Kidawa-Błońska was initially registered as the Civic Platform candidate for the first election on May 10th. Following challenges regarding the election and its subsequent delay, Kidawa resigned from her candidacy 5 days later on May 15th, allowing her party to nominate Rafał Trzaskowski instead.)
Party	Independent (Note: The President of Poland traditionally resigns from party membership after taking office. Although Duda was officially an independent, his campaign was endorsed and funded by Law and Justice.)	PO
Popular vote	10,440,648	10,018,263
Percentage	51.03%	48.97%
President before election
Andrzej Duda
Independent
Elected President
Andrzej Duda
Independent

Presidential elections were held in Poland on 28 June 2020. As no candidate received a majority of the vote, a second round was held on 12 July, in which incumbent president Andrzej Duda, running with the support of the incumbent government of the Law and Justice (PiS) party, faced off against Civic Platform vice-chairman and Mayor of Warsaw Rafał Trzaskowski. In the second round Duda was re-elected for a second term with 51% of the vote, becoming the first incumbent to win re-election since Aleksander Kwaśniewski in 2000.

The first round of voting was due to be held on 10 May 2020, but was postponed due to the COVID-19 pandemic in Poland. On 6 May 2020 the Agreement party, which was in a governing alliance with their senior alliance partner Law and Justice (PiS) party and was opposed to pursuing the original election date, reached an arrangement to set new dates for the election. The following day, the PKW declared that the election would not take place on 10 May 2020. On 3 June 2020, the Marshal of the Sejm, Elżbieta Witek, ordered the first round of the election to be held on 28 June 2020 and scheduled the second round on 12 July 2020.

Duda's victory marked the sixth national election in a row where the right-wing PiS party defeated the opposition centrist and center-left forces.

== Electoral system ==
The President of Poland is directly elected using a two-round system for a five-year term, with a two-term limit. Andrzej Duda's first term expired on 6 August 2020 when he reaffirmed his oath of office before the National Assembly, a joint session of the Sejm and Senate and began his second term.

Pursuant to the provisions of the Constitution, the president must be elected by an absolute majority of valid votes. If no candidate succeeds in passing this threshold in the first round, a second round of voting is contested between with the two candidates who received the largest shares of the vote.

In order to be registered to contest the election, a candidate must be a Polish citizen, be at least 35 years old on the day of the first round of the election, and have collected at least 100,000 voters' signatures by 10 June 2020 at midnight.

Polls opened on election day at 07:00 CEST and closed at 21:00 CEST (UTC+2).

== COVID-19, election timing and controversy ==
The election was originally scheduled for 10 May 2020, which caused extreme political controversy related to the COVID-19 pandemic. Many candidates, constitutionalists and even politicians from the ruling coalition criticized the government's plan of holding the election as originally scheduled during the pandemic. As a compromise, the Agreement political party proposed lengthening the president's term by two years, which was supported by the Minister of Health, Łukasz Szumowski. This was rejected by the opposition. The main opposition party, Civic Platform, wanted the election to be held in May 2021. The ruling conservative party Law and Justice also wished to change the electoral rules and to organize the election by postal voting only. Changing election rules less than six months prior to voting was ruled to be unconstitutional by the Constitutional Tribunal in 2011. Voting only by post is considered unconstitutional by some including Polish Supreme Court in a non-binding opinion.

=== Email requests by Poczta Polska for private data ===
At 02:26 early in the morning on 23 April, every Polish mayor and city council president received an anonymous, unsigned e-mail from Poczta Polska (Polish Post) saying that they were required to deliver the private data of 30 million Polish citizens including their PESEL (national identification number), date of birth, address, and other private data in a .txt file format lacking any passwords or security. Many Polish mayors and city council presidents, lawyers, and other citizens criticized the order to provide such private data, stating that the order violated the GDPR and Polish Law, since the legal act referred to in the email had no legal validity; it concerned a bill that was still undergoing legislative procedures. Citizens and other officials stated their intention to file a lawsuit to the prosecutor's office about the possibility of crimes being committed by the government-run Poczta Polska and by the politicians responsible for the regulation.

=== Electoral cards leakage ===
On 29 April 2020, 11 days before the planned election date, election candidate Stanisław Żółtek presented a copy of an electoral ballot at a press conference. The copies contained the names of all the candidates and other forms to be filled by voters. Żółtek said that he received the ballots from workers of one of the companies that was printing and preparing electoral documents. Poczta Polska notified the Internal Security Agency about the leak. As of 2 May 2020, Polish law did not authorise Poczta Polska to organise postal voting except in a small number of special cases.

=== Presidential election boycott ===
On 30 April 2020, three former Polish presidents and six prime ministers called for a boycott of 2020 presidential election, on the grounds that the election would be unconstitutional and could not guarantee the confidentiality of voters.

=== Election day change ===
On 6 May, Jarosław Gowin, the leader of Agreement, and Jarosław Kaczyński, the leader of Law and Justice struck an agreement to move the election. The two parties had earlier been engaged in a political struggle over whether the election should proceed in May.

On 7 May, the Sejm approved legislation for the election to be held via postal ballot. The same day, PKW announced that "The current legal regulation deprived the National Electoral Commission of the instruments necessary to perform its duties. In connection with the above, the National Electoral Commission informs voters, election committees, candidates, election administration and local government units that voting on 10 May 2020 cannot take place."

The movement of the election day was met with support and opposition from both the "anti" and "pro" Law and Justice spheres of Polish politics. An opinion poll for Rzeczpospolita gauged public support for the Gowin-Kaczyński agreement at 43.5%, with 36.3% being against, and the rest undecided.

=== Judgment of WSA court ===
On 15 September 2020, the Voivodship Administrative Court in Warsaw judged that the decision of Prime Minister Mateusz Morawiecki to hold the May elections exclusively through mail-in voting was "[a] gross violation of the law and was issued without [legal] grounds" and violated article 7 of the Polish Constitution, article 157, paragraph 1 and article 187, paragraph 1 and 2 of the Electoral Code. The opposition demanded Morawiecki's resignation.

== Candidate selection ==
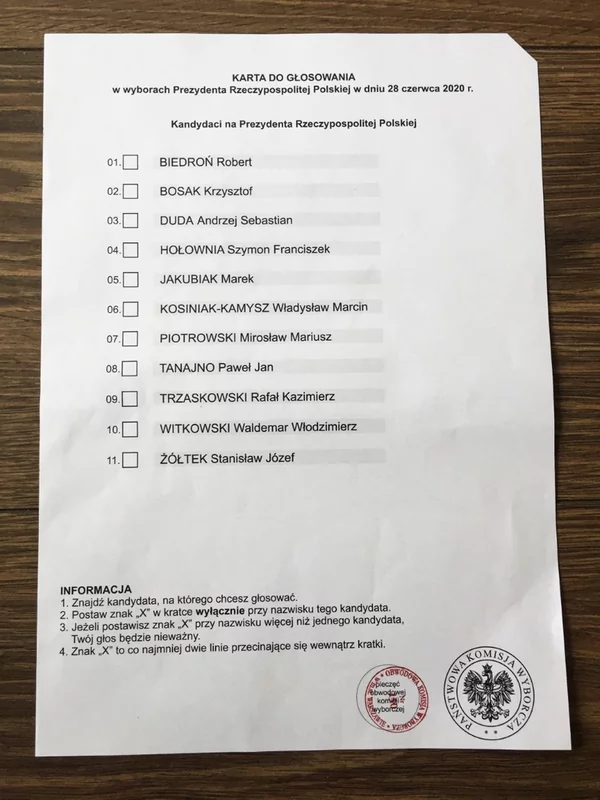
Ballot paper (first round)

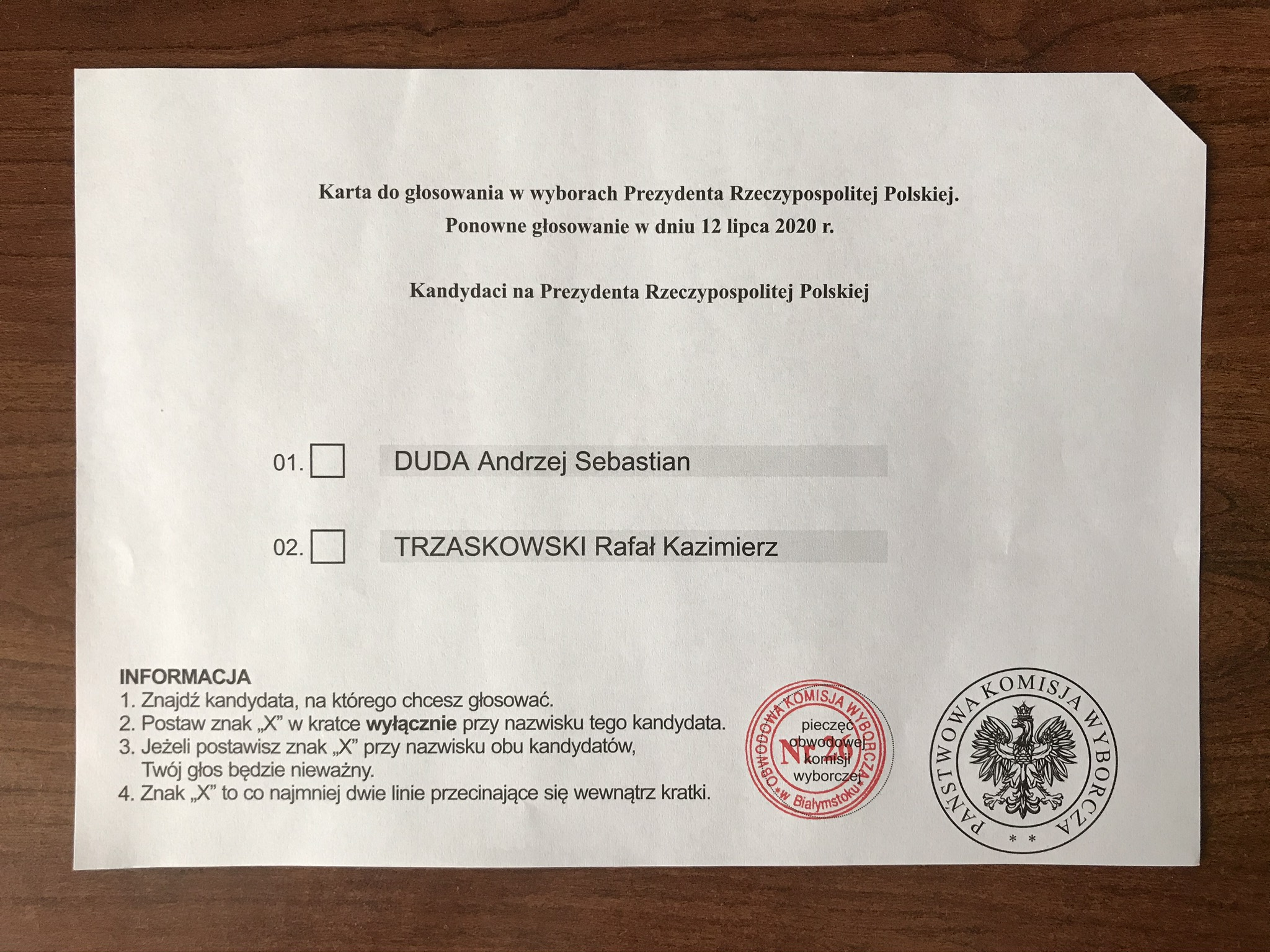
Ballot paper (second round)

=== Law and Justice / United Right ===
Incumbent President Andrzej Duda was eligible to run for a second term. On 24 October 2019, in an open letter to the elected members of the Sejm and Senate, PiS chairman Jarosław Kaczyński announced that the party will strongly support Andrzej Duda in next year's presidential election.

=== Civic Platform / Civic Coalition ===
Donald Tusk was widely expected to make a comeback in Polish politics and to run for President, all the more so given that his European office expired at the end of 2019. However, in November 2019, he announced he would not run for the Polish presidency, citing that he has "a bag of difficult, unpopular decisions since prime minister" that would burden his candidacy. He is said to have been advised against a run by private opinion polls. He decided to run instead for the leadership of the European People's Party. As a result, party leader Grzegorz Schetyna decided to hold a convention in order to nominate a candidate for president. The primary was won by Małgorzata Kidawa-Błońska.

Małgorzata Kidawa-Błońska resigned her candidacy on 15 May 2020 under pressure of falling poll numbers and her own party. After this, Rafał Trzaskowski became the new candidate of the Civic Coalition. He managed to receive over 1.6 million signatures, securing his eligibility to run in the election. After receiving 30.46% of the vote in the first round he was defeated by the incumbent Andrzej Duda in the second round, winning 48.97% of the vote.

==== Ran, but withdrew before the election ====
- Małgorzata Kidawa-Błońska – Deputy Marshal of the Sejm

Declared, but lost at the primary convention:

- Jacek Jaśkowiak – Mayor of Poznań.

Declined:

- Donald Tusk – President of the European Council, former Prime Minister of Poland, and a candidate in 2005.
- Radosław Sikorski – Former Marshal of the Sejm, former Minister of Foreign Affairs, and a candidate in primary in 2010. Later expressed interest to run after Kidawa-Błońska resigned, but was not considered by party leadership, which claimed to have chosen Trzaskowski 'unanimously'.
- Bartosz Arłukowicz – Former Minister of Health.
- Tomasz Grodzki – Marshal of the Senate of Poland.

=== Polish Coalition ===
In December 2019, PSL chairman Władysław Kosiniak-Kamysz announced that he would be launching a campaign for president.

Declined

- Paweł Kukiz – Leader of Kukiz'15, MP, and candidate in 2015.

=== The Left ===
At the beginning of January 2020, Włodzimierz Czarzasty said that The Left would nominate Robert Biedroń.

Declined

- Adrian Zandberg – MP, co-leader of Lewica Razem, and co-chairman of The Left.

=== Confederation Liberty and Independence ===
The party held an open primary, a first in Polish politics. The 2019–20 Confederation presidential primary was modeled after the primary voting model common in the United States. Krzysztof Bosak was nominated during the final round of voting held at the convention in Warsaw on 18 January.

Declared, but lost in the primary election:

- Konrad Berkowicz – MP, and vice-chairman of KORWiN.
- Grzegorz Braun – MP, and chairman of KKP.
- Artur Dziambor – MP, and vice-chairman of KORWiN.
- Janusz Korwin-Mikke – MP, and chairman of KORWiN.
- Paweł Skutecki – Former MP from Kukiz'15.
- Krzysztof Tołwiński – Former MP from Law and Justice.
- Jacek Wilk – Former MP from KORWiN.
- Magdalena Ziętek-Wielomska – Lawyer, philosopher, publicist and author, wife of Adam Wielomski.

=== Rejected candidates ===
These following candidates made electoral comitties but failed to submit 100,000 signatures supporting their run by the 26 March deadline:

- Piotr Bakun – Economist
- Marcin Bugajski – Political scientist
- Roland Dubowski – President of the Association of Heirs of Polish War Veterans of the Second World War
- Artur Głowacki – Businessman
- Sławomir Grzywa – Leader of "Sami Swoi" ("All Good Friends")
- Wiesław Lewicki – Chairman of Normal Country
- Andrzej Dariusz Placzyński – Businessman
- Leszek Samborski – Former Member of the Sejm
- Grzegorz Sowa – Businessman associated with 1Polska.pl
- Romuald Starosielec – Journalist supported by "Unity of the Nation"
- Paweł Świtoń – Businessman
- Krzysztof Urbanowicz – Political activist
- Andrzej Voigt – Businessman
- Jerzy Walkowiak – Political activist

== Candidates ==
Name	Born	Campaign	Last position/job	Party
Robert Biedroń	13 April 1976 (44); Rymanów, Subcarpathia		Leader of Spring (2019–2021); Member of the European Parliament (2019–present)	The Left
Krzysztof Bosak	13 June 1982 (38); Zielona Góra, Lubusz		Member of the Sejm (2005–2007, 2019–present)	Confederation
Andrzej Duda	24 May 1972 (48); Kraków, Lesser Poland		President of Poland (2015–2025)	Independent
Szymon Hołownia	3 September 1976 (43); Białystok, Podlaskie		Television personality	Independent
Marek Jakubiak	30 April 1959 (61); Warsaw, Masovian		Leader of Federation for the Republic (2018–present); Member of the Sejm (2015–2019) (2023–present)	Federation for the Republic
Władysław Kosiniak-Kamysz	10 August 1981 (38); Kraków, Lesser Poland		Leader of Polish People's Party (2015–present); Parliamentary Leader of Polish Coalition (2018–present); Member of the Sejm (2015–present)	Polish People's Party
Mirosław Piotrowski	9 January 1966 (54); Zielona Góra, Lubusz		Leader of Real Europe Movement (2018–present); Member of the European Parliament (2004–2019)	Real Europe Movement
Paweł Tanajno	19 December 1975 (44); Warsaw, Masovian		Entrepreneur	Independent
Rafał Trzaskowski	17 January 1972 (48); Warsaw, Masovian		Mayor of Warsaw (2018–present)	Civic Coalition
Waldemar Witkowski	29 October 1953 (66); Poznań, Greater Poland		Senator of Poland (2023–present); Leader of Labour Union (2006–present); Member of the Greater Poland Sejmik (2006–2018)	Labour Union
Stanisław Żółtek	7 May 1956 (64); Kraków, Lesser Poland		Leader of Congress of the New Right (2017–present); Leader of PolExit (2019–present); Member of the European Parliament (2014–2019)	Congress of the New Right
Stanisław Żółtek	7 May 1956 (64); Kraków, Lesser Poland		Leader of Congress of the New Right (2017–present); Leader of PolExit (2019–present); Member of the European Parliament (2014–2019)	PolExit

== Campaign ==
=== May election campaign ===
Andrzej Duda during his time as President visited all counties, as he promised in his 2015 campaign, which some described as pre-election campaign. Małgorzata Kidawa-Błońska, Prime Ministerial candidate in 2019 election was chosen as candidate in primary against Mayor of Poznań Jacek Jaśkowiak who was supported by people of leader of KO, Grzegorz Schetyna.

Kidawa-Błońska withdrew after new elections were scheduled. She was replaced by Rafał Trzaskowski.

=== Second round candidate endorsements ===
Candidate	First round	Endorsement
Szymon Hołownia	13.87%	Rafał Trzaskowski
Krzysztof Bosak	6.78%	No endorsement
Władysław Kosiniak-Kamysz	2.36%	Rafał Trzaskowski
Robert Biedroń	2.22%	Rafał Trzaskowski
Stanisław Żółtek	0.23%	Against Duda
Marek Jakubiak	0.17%	Andrzej Duda
Waldemar Witkowski	0.14%	No endorsement

== Debates ==
=== First round political debates ===
- Newsweek – 15 June 2020 (cancelled)
- TVP Info – 17 June 2020, 21:00; moderated by Michał Adamczyk.
- TVN24 – 19 June 2020 (cancelled)
- Polsat News – 22 June 2020 (cancelled)
- Onet – 24 June 2020 (cancelled)

=== Second round political debates ===
Duda and Trzaskowski both refused to take part in debates at each other's preferred media outlet and a proposal from Duda and supported by Trzaskowski to hold a joint debate hosted by TVP, Polsat and TVN was rejected by TVP Director Jacek Kurski.

- TVN, TVN24, Onet and WP joint debate – 19:25 (UTC+2), 2 July 2020 (cancelled by Duda's withdrawal)
- TVP Townhall debate - 21:00 (UTC+2), 6 July 2020 (only Duda appeared)
- Joint debate with more than 15 newsrooms, organized by Trzaskowski staff, announced the day before – 20:30 (UTC+2), 6 July 2020 (only Trzaskowski appeared)

== Opinion polls ==
=== First round ===
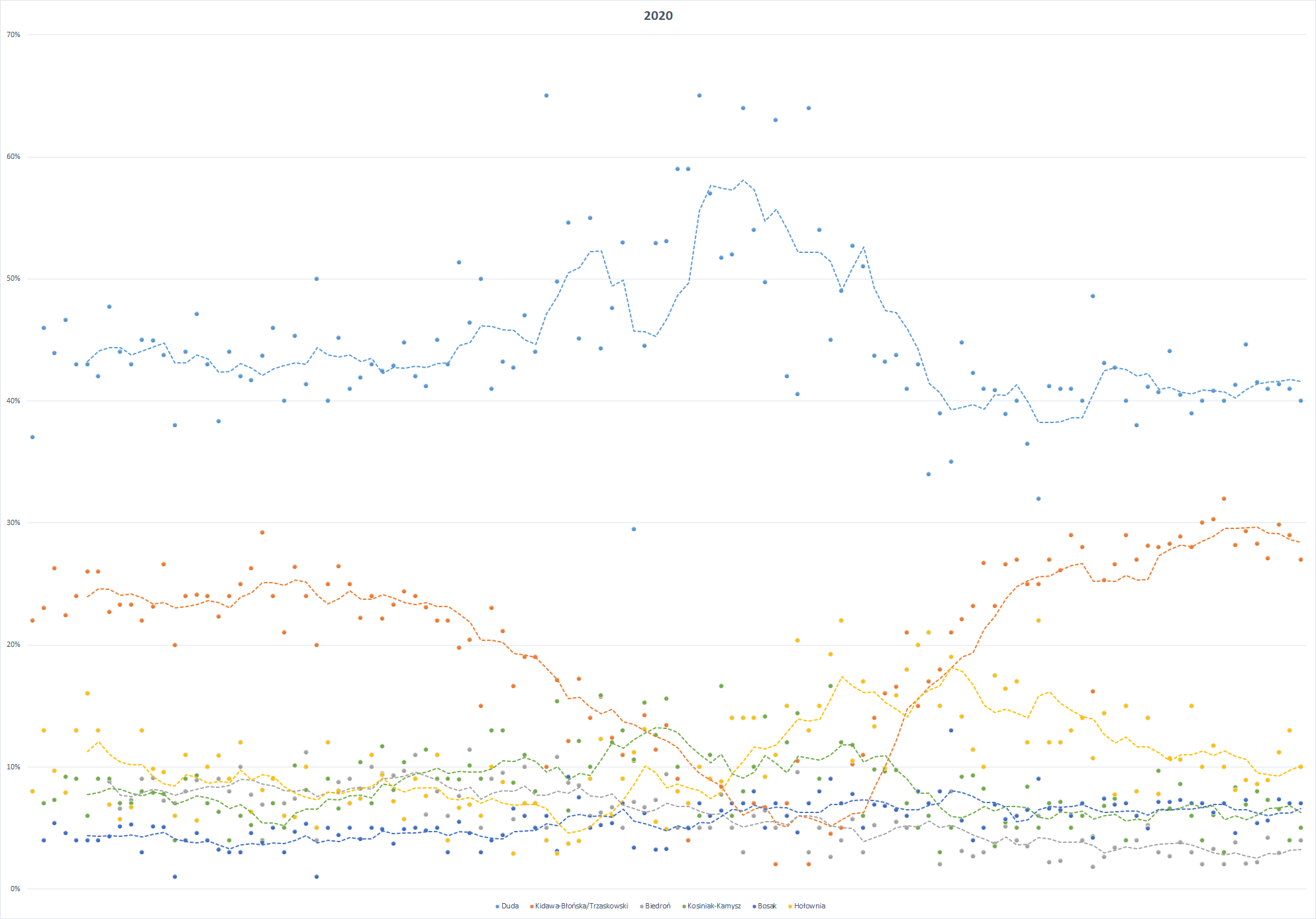
2020 Polish presidential election polls for the first round.

=== Second round ===
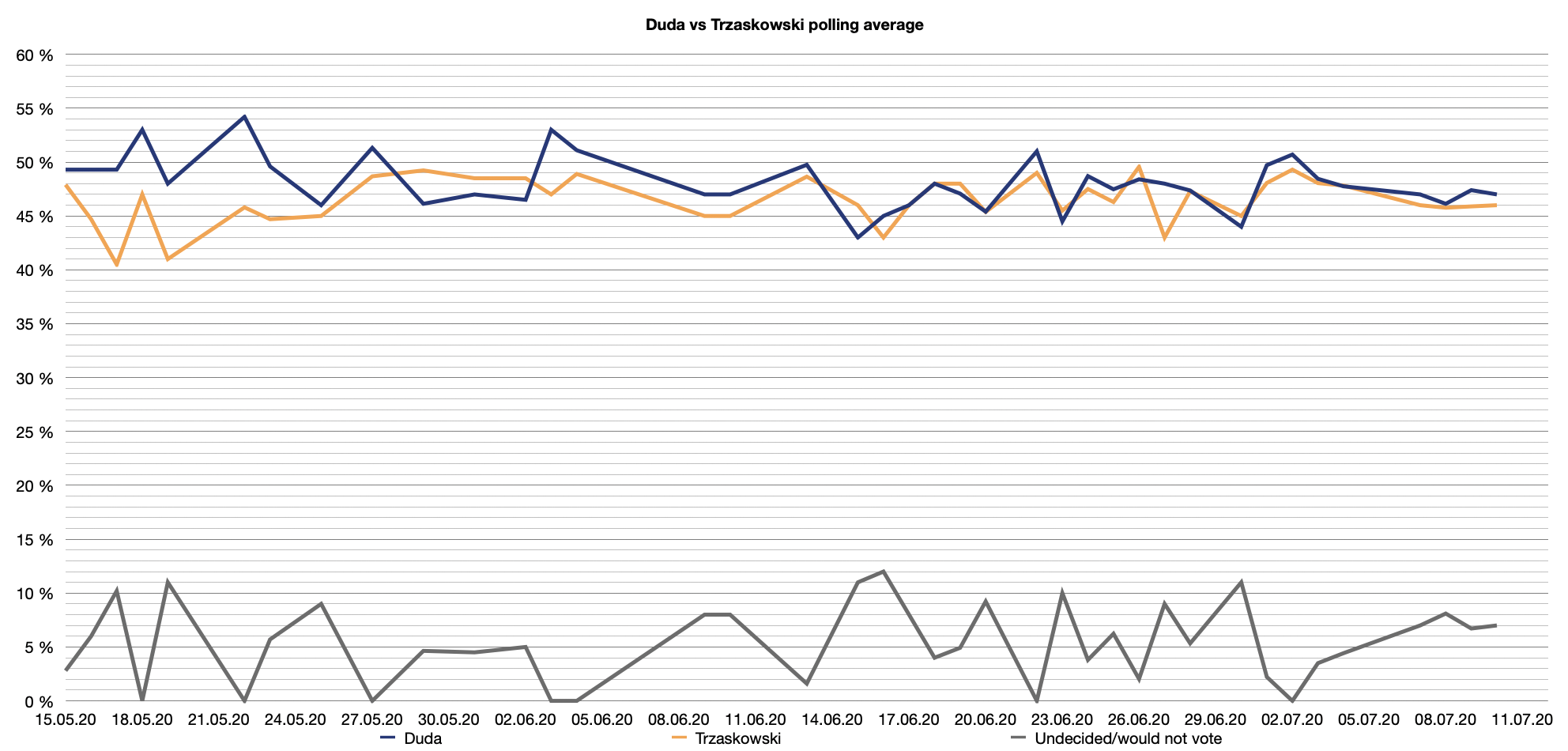
2020 Polish presidential election polls for the second round.

== Results ==
Results of the first round.

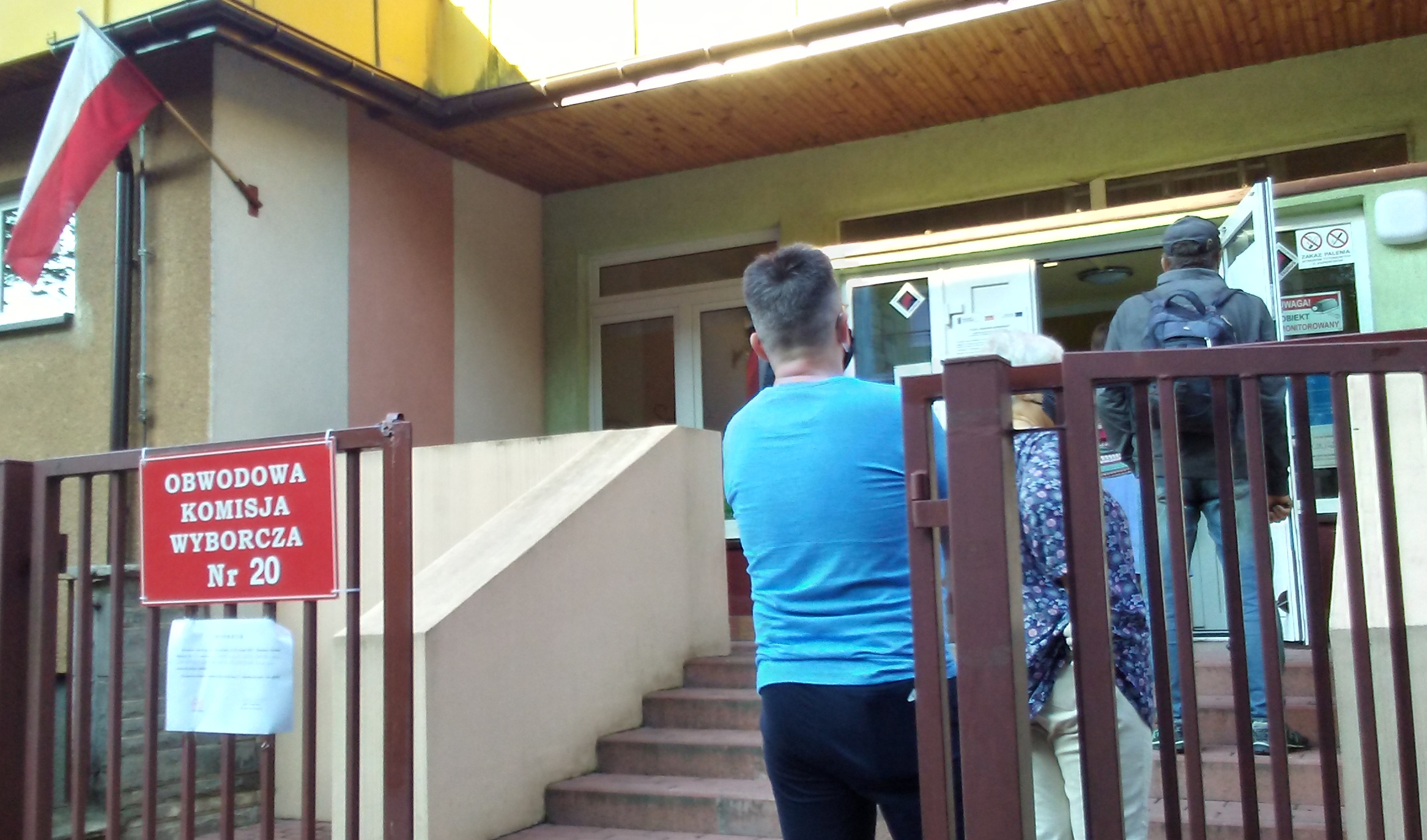
Queue to vote just after the opening of the premises

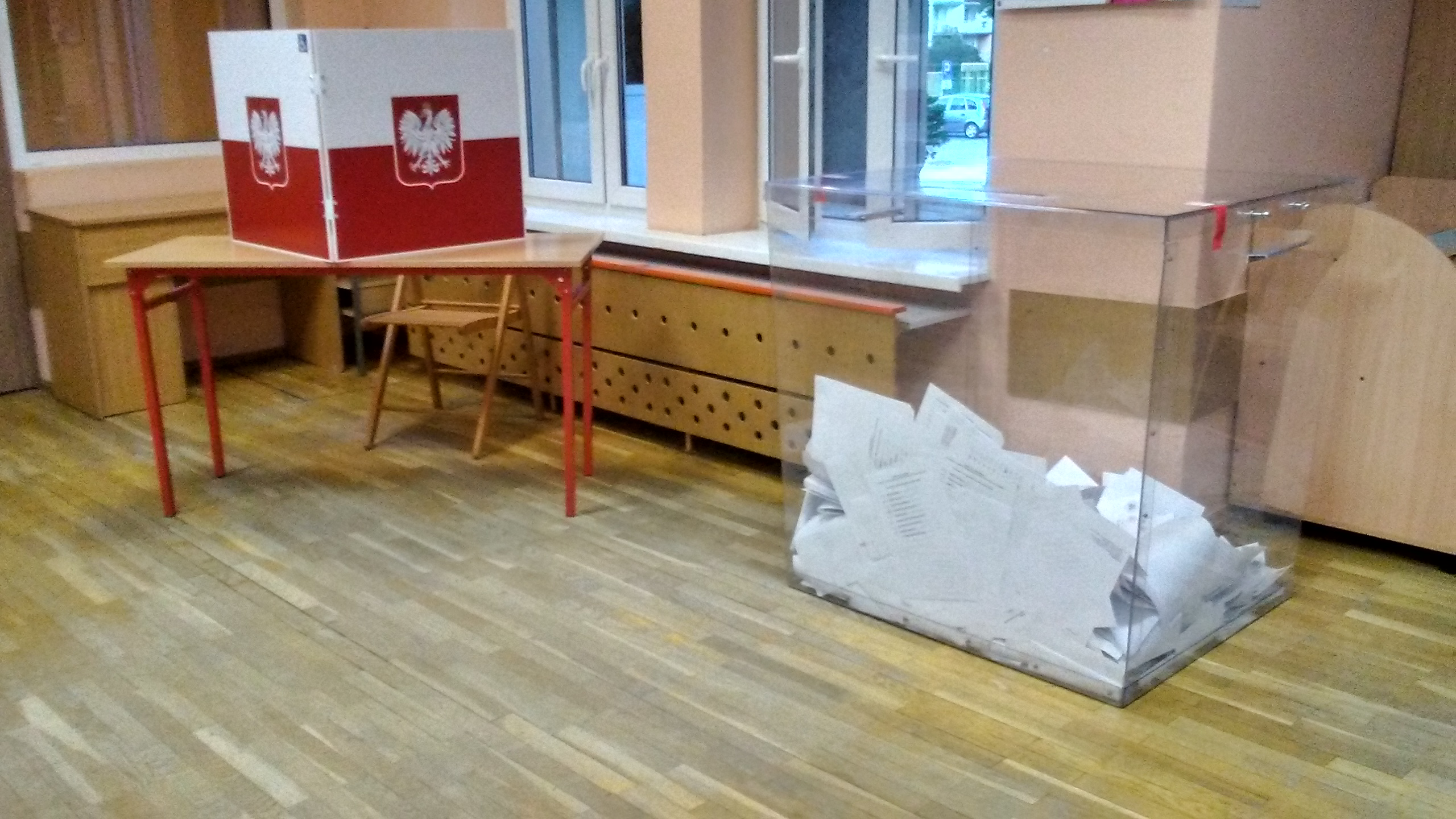
Ballot box

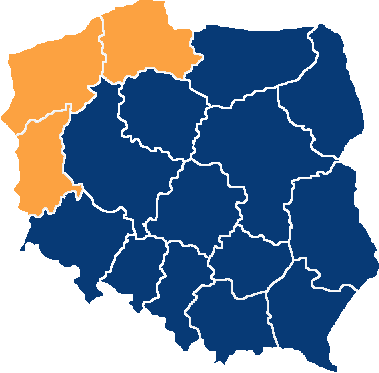
First place candidate of the first round, by Voivodeship.

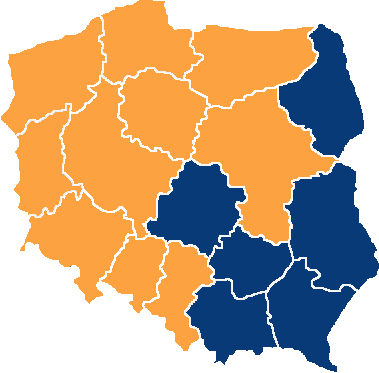
First place candidate of the second round, by Voivodeship.

As there was no outright winner in the first round, the top two candidates - Andrzej Duda and Rafał Trzaskowski - advanced to the second round. Szymon Hołownia and Krzysztof Bosak placed third and fourth respectively. Władysław Kosiniak-Kamysz and Robert Biedroń both underperformed expectations taking the fifth and sixth place.

In the second round, there was a close race between Duda and Trzaskowski. Duda had a slight lead in 9:00 pm exit polls which gave him 50.4% of the vote to Trzaskowski's 49.6%. This was within the 2% margin of error leading to the pollster Ipsos announcing the race to be too close to call. Duda's vote share eventually amounted to 51.03%, securing his reelection.

Candidate	Party	First round		Second round	
Candidate	Party	Votes	%	Votes	%
Andrzej Duda	Independent (PiS)	8,450,513	43.50	10,440,648	51.03
Rafał Trzaskowski	Civic Coalition (PO)	5,917,340	30.46	10,018,263	48.97
Szymon Hołownia	Independent	2,693,397	13.87		
Krzysztof Bosak	Confederation (RN)	1,317,380	6.78		
Władysław Kosiniak-Kamysz	Polish People's Party	459,365	2.36		
Robert Biedroń	The Left (W)	432,129	2.22		
Stanisław Żółtek	Congress of the New Right	45,419	0.23		
Marek Jakubiak	Federation for the Republic	33,652	0.17		
Paweł Tanajno	Independent	27,909	0.14		
Waldemar Witkowski	Labour Union	27,290	0.14		
Mirosław Piotrowski	Real Europe Movement	21,065	0.11		
Total		19,425,459	100.00	20,458,911	100.00
Valid votes		19,425,459	99.70	20,458,911	99.14
Invalid/blank votes		58,301	0.30	177,724	0.86
Total votes		19,483,760	100.00	20,636,635	100.00
Registered voters/turnout		30,204,792	64.51	30,268,460	68.18
Source: PKW, PKW, PKW, PKW

Vote share
Second round
Duda	51.03%
Trzaskowski	48.97%
First round
Duda	43.50%
Trzaskowski	30.46%
Hołownia	13.87%
Bosak	6.78%
Kosiniak-Kamysz	2.36%
Biedroń	2.22%
Others	0.79%

=== By voivodeship ===
==== First round ====
Voivodeship	Andrzej Duda PiS		Rafał Trzaskowski KO		Szymon Hołownia Independent		Krzysztof Bosak Confederation		Władysław Kosiniak-Kamysz PSL		Robert Biedroń The Left		Stanisław Żółtek KNP		Marek Jakubiak FdR		Paweł Tanajno Independent		Waldemar Witkowski UP		Mirosław Piotrowski RPE	
Voivodeship	Votes	%	Votes	%	Votes	%	Votes	%	Votes	%	Votes	%	Votes	%	Votes	%	Votes	%	Votes	%	Votes	%
Lower Silesian	545,001	38.21	512,357	35.92	201,050	14.09	91,793	6.44	27,210	1.91	37,245	2.61	3,542	0.25	2,323	0.16	2,356	0.17	2,163	0.15	1,353	0.09
Kuyavian-Pomeranian	380,190	39.54	322,961	33.59	148,597	15.46	56,532	5.88	24,234	2.52	22,250	2.31	2,083	0.22	1,310	0.14	1,309	0.14	1,082	0.11	912	0.09
Lublin	591,234	56.67	201,571	19.32	108,987	10.45	83,403	7.99	31,756	3.04	17,010	1.63	2,561	0.25	2,095	0.20	1,430	0.14	1,027	0.10	2,268	0.22
Lubusz	161,894	34.19	174,894	36.94	84,590	17.87	28,743	6.07	9,583	2.02	10,413	2.20	913	0.19	686	0.14	756	0.16	572	0.12	405	0.09
Łódź	589,185	46.63	363,209	28.74	163,294	12.92	77,759	6.15	31,245	2.47	29,022	2.30	2,901	0.23	2,143	0.17	1,824	0.14	1,703	0.13	1,322	0.10
Lesser Poland	912,452	51.11	426,950	23.92	206,034	11.54	138,603	7.76	52,483	2.94	34,230	1.92	5,015	0.28	3,217	0.18	2,116	0.12	2,371	0.13	1,763	0.10
Masovian	1,305,649	40.71	1,099,956	34.30	408,502	12.74	209,037	6.52	72,663	2.27	81,797	2.55	7,706	0.24	7,104	0.22	4,850	0.15	6,128	0.19	3,513	0.11
Opole	176,552	40.46	139,125	31.88	72,609	16.64	26,661	6.11	10,146	2.33	8,039	1.84	919	0.21	702	0.16	622	0.14	536	0.12	440	0.10
Subcarpathian	646,103	60.69	172,789	16.23	100,742	9.46	95,350	8.96	27,287	2.56	14,802	1.39	2,341	0.22	1,947	0.18	1,122	0.11	875	0.08	1,201	0.11
Podlaskie	280,113	50.59	114,076	20.60	92,088	16.63	42,823	7.73	11,681	2.11	8,746	1.58	1,299	0.23	1,024	0.18	747	0.13	518	0.09	602	0.11
Pomeranian	397,169	33.82	453,006	38.58	189,390	16.13	72,978	6.22	22,400	1.91	30,155	2.57	2,716	0.23	1,702	0.14	1,795	0.15	1,671	0.14	1,210	0.10
Silesian	913,421	41.22	693,193	31.28	341,169	15.39	157,010	7.08	42,625	1.92	50,805	2.29	5,399	0.24	3,565	0.16	3,535	0.16	3,047	0.14	2,429	0.11
Świętokrzyskie	343,752	56.02	130,670	21.29	62,383	10.17	42,544	6.93	19,494	3.18	10,728	1.75	1,214	0.20	1,018	0.17	668	0.11	555	0.09	614	0.10
Warmian-Masurian	253,931	40.10	208,922	33.00	93,598	14.78	42,365	6.69	15,689	2.48	14,025	2.21	1,261	0.20	1,062	0.17	959	0.15	755	0.12	625	0.10
Greater Poland	666,539	37.85	595,803	33.83	293,107	16.64	106,367	6.04	44,134	2.51	41,200	2.34	3,932	0.22	2,543	0.14	2,498	0.14	3,246	0.18	1,698	0.10
West Pomeranian	287,328	35.38	307,858	37.91	127,257	15.67	45,412	5.59	16,735	2.06	21,662	2.67	1,617	0.20	1,211	0.15	1,322	0.16	1,041	0.13	710	0.09
Poland	8,450,513	43.50	5,917,340	30.46	2,693,397	13.87	1,317,380	6.78	459,365	2.36	432,129	2.22	45,419	0.23	33,652	0.17	27,909	0.14	27,290	0.14	21,065	0.11
Source: National Electoral Commission

==== Second round ====
Voivodeship	Andrzej Duda PiS		Rafał Trzaskowski KO	
Voivodeship	Votes	%	Votes	%
Lower Silesian	663,831	44.61	824,109	55.39
Kuyavian-Pomeranian	476,728	46.77	542,472	53.23
Lublin	725,453	66.31	368,630	33.69
Lubusz	199,589	40.20	296,849	59.80
Łódź	718,404	54.46	600,673	45.54
Lesser Poland	1,107,590	59.65	749,165	40.35
Masovian	1,630,346	47.74	1,784,947	52.26
Opole	215,648	47.36	239,682	52.64
Subcarpathian	785,645	70.92	322,133	29.08
Podlaskie	352,489	60.14	233,621	39.86
Pomeranian	512,916	40.16	764,363	59.84
Silesian	1,110,233	48.99	1,155,894	51.01
Świętokrzyskie	419,367	64.41	231,748	35.59
Warmian-Masurian	325,723	46.84	369,736	53.16
Greater Poland	829,590	45.07	1,011,128	54.93
West Pomeranian	367,096	41.24	523,113	58.76
Poland	10,440,648	51.03	10,018,263	48.97
Source: National Electoral Commission

=== Electorate demographics ===
Demographic	Andrzej Duda	Rafał Trzaskowski
Total vote	51.0%	49.0%
Sex
Men	51.9%	48.1%
Women	50.3%	49.7%
Age
18–29 years old	36.3%	63.7%
30–39 years old	45.3%	54.7%
40–49 years old	45.6%	54.4%
50–59 years old	59.7%	40.3%
60 or older	62.5%	37.5%
Occupation
Company owner	34.1%	65.9%
Manager/expert	32.6%	67.4%
Admin/services	44.7%	55.3%
Farmer	81.4%	18.6%
Worker	66.4%	33.6%
Student	30.1%	69.9%
Unemployed	65.4%	34.6%
Retired	64.1%	35.9%
Others	50.6%	49.4%
Agglomeration
Rural	63.8%	36.2%
<50,000 pop.	46.9%	53.1%
51,000 - 200,000 pop.	49.6%	50.4%
201,000 – 500,000 pop.	38.7%	61.3%
>500,000 pop.	34.2%	65.8%
Education
Elementary	77.3%	22.7%
Vocational	75.0%	25.0%
Secondary	50.9%	49.1%
Higher	34.9%	65.1%
Sejm vote in 2019
Law and Justice	96.9%	3.1%
Civic Coalition	1.8%	98.2%
The Left	8.3%	91.7%
Polish Coalition	29.4%	70.6%
Confederation	40.0%	60.0%
Others	16.8%	83.2%
Didn't vote	38.3%	61.7%
Don't remember	40.1%	59.9%
First-round president vote in 2020
Robert Biedroń	16.0%	84.0%
Krzysztof Bosak	52.3%	47.7%
Andrzej Duda	99.1%	0.9%
Szymon Hołownia	15.0%	85.0%
Marek Jakubiak	65.9%	34.1%
Władysław Kosiniak-Kamysz	24.3%	75.7%
Mirosław Piotrowski	76.1%	23.9%
Paweł Tanajno	13.0%	87.0%
Rafał Trzaskowski	0.7%	99.3%
Waldemar Witkowski	10.8%	89.2%
Stanisław Żółtek	34.7%	65.3%
Didn't vote	49.8%	50.2%
Don't remember	39.2%	60.8%
Second-round president vote in 2015
Andrzej Duda	91.1%	8.9%
Bronisław Komorowski	4.4%	95.6%
Didn't vote	30.1%	69.9%
Don't remember	39.2%	60.8%
Source: Ipsos

== Reactions ==
After voting had ended, Andrzej Duda invited Rafał Trzaskowski to the Presidential Palace to "shake hands" and "end the campaign". Trzaskowski rejected and said that they could meet after announcing the official election results. The next day, Trzaskowski congratulated Duda on his victory.

US President Donald Trump, President of the European Commission Ursula von der Leyen, NATO Secretary General Jens Stoltenberg, Lega Nord leader and former Italian Minister of the Interior Matteo Salvini, Lithuanian President Gitanas Nausėda, UK Prime Minister Boris Johnson, Hungarian Prime Minister Viktor Orbán, Czech President Miloš Zeman, Slovak President Zuzana Čaputová, and Ukrainian president Volodymyr Zelenskyy congratulated Duda on his victory.

Observers viewed the election results as illustrating a divided Polish society. They also predicted that PiS would continue pursuing its policies in a number of areas and clashing with the EU. Duda performed strongest among older, rural, low educated and eastern voters.

In February 2025, Mateusz Morawiecki was charged with abuse of power over his decision to hold the election solely by postal ballot when he was prime minister.

=== Results challenged ===
The Civic Platform party challenged results of the elections to the Polish Supreme Court, alleging irregularities and biased coverage by the state television. The appeal includes complaints from 2,000 people, containing accusations of problems with voter registry, ballot papers not being sent in time as well as issues with voting abroad. The TVP public broadcaster did not broadcast a single meeting of Trzaskowski with voters. Press.pl, a media-monitoring service, found that, between 3 and 16 June, nearly 97% of Wiadomości news stories devoted to Duda were positive while almost 87% of those on Trzaskowski were negative.

The Supreme Court ruled the election valid, stating that doubts about the television's honesty notwithstanding, TVP was not the only media source available for voters, and that voters were free to choose what media to watch.

=== Office for Democratic Institutions and Human Rights report ===
The OSCE's Office for Democratic Institutions and Human Rights investigated the election and found that it was "administered professionally despite the lack of legal clarity." The ODIHR also reported that the presidential campaign "was characterized by negative and intolerant rhetoric further polarizing an already adversarial political environment. [...] the TVP [public broadcaster] failed in its legal duty to provide balanced and impartial coverage. Instead, it acted as a campaign vehicle for the incumbent and frequently portrayed his main challenger as a threat to Polish values and national interests. Some of the reporting was charged with xenophobic and anti-Semitic undertones."
