= New Hope (Polish political party) =

Far-right political party in Poland

New Hope Nowa Nadzieja
- Abbreviation: NN
- President: Sławomir Mentzen
- Vice-presidents: Konrad Berkowicz; Marcin Sypniewski; Bartłomiej Pejo
- Founder: Janusz Korwin-Mikke
- Founded: 22 January 2015; 11 years ago
- Split from: Congress of the New Right
- Headquarters: Piękna Street 3/8, Warsaw, Poland
- Youth wing: Youth for Liberty
- Ideology: Conservatism; Right-libertarianism; Right-wing populism; Euroscepticism
- Political position: Far-right
- National affiliation: Confederation Liberty and Independence
- European affiliation: Europe of Sovereign Nations Party
- European Parliament group: Europe of Sovereign Nations Group
- International affiliation: International Alliance of Libertarian Parties
- Colors: Gold; Blue
- Sejm: 8 / 460
- Senate: 0 / 100
- European Parliament: 2 / 53
- City mayors: 1 / 107
- Regional assemblies: 2 / 552

Website
- wolnosc.pl

The New Hope (Polish: Nowa Nadzieja [ˈnova naˈd͡ʑɛ.ja], NN) is a far-right political party in Poland and member of Confederation. As of 2024, it is led by Sławomir Mentzen.

Founded in 2015 by Janusz Korwin-Mikke as a result of his removal from the Congress of the New Right, his former party, it was initially called Coalition for the Renewal of the Republic of Liberty and Hope (Koalicja Odnowy Rzeczypospolitej Wolność i Nadzieja) and then subsequently Confederation for the Renewal of the Republic of Liberty and Hope (Konfederacja Odnowy Rzeczypospolitej Wolność i Nadzieja), both backronym to KORWiN or sometimes shortened to Liberty (Wolność).

The party's Polish name was originally a backronym of the founder's name Korwin-Mikke, who took part in the 2015 presidential election.

== History ==
The party was formed shortly after Janusz Korwin-Mikke was removed from the chairmanship of the Congress of the New Right (KNP). The pro-Korwin faction of the KNP ended up forming the KORWiN party ahead of the 2015 Polish presidential election. Janusz Korwin-Mikke finished fourth in that election, earning 3.26% of the vote (486,084 votes). In the 2015 Polish parliamentary election, the party earned 4.76% of the vote (722,999 votes) but failed to reach the 5% electoral threshold needed to get any seats.

The party gained two seats during the VIII Sejm after Jacek Wilk and later Jakub Kulesza left Kukiz'15 to join KORWiN.

Ahead of the 2019 European Parliament election in Poland, KORWiN formed an alliance with the National Movement (RN) and other right-wing parties called the Confederation. Even though the coalition failed to get any seats, the main parties stayed together to contest the 2019 Polish parliamentary election. The Confederation ended up receiving 6.81% of the vote (1,256,953 votes) and 11 seats, five of which were taken by the KORWiN members.

For the 2020 Polish presidential election, KORWiN endorsed vice-chairman of the RN Krzysztof Bosak following his victory in the 2019–20 Confederation presidential primary. Bosak received 6.8% of the vote (1,317,380) which was by far the best result of any candidate (or party) endorsed by Janusz Korwin-Mikke.

In March 2022, claiming that the party had abandoned its libertarian roots and become Russophilic, three MPs left the party, creating a splinter group called Wolnościowcy.

On 15 October 2022, Korwin-Mikke stepped down as the party president and was replaced by Sławomir Mentzen, the party's then vice president. Mentzen has worked to transform the image of the party away from a personality cult of Korwin-Mikke culminating in changing the party's name to "New Hope." The founder of the party, Janusz Korwin-Mikke, was expelled from the party on 28 October 2023, which its new chairman, Sławomir Mentzen, justified with his controversial statements that harmed the party and contributed to it achieving a lower result than expected in the parliamentary elections this year."

In the 2023 Polish parliamentary election, the Confederation ended up winning 7.16% of the popular vote and won 18 seats in the Sejm, eight of which were taken by the NN members.

On 21 April 2024, in the second round of the presidential elections in Bełchatów, Patryk Marjan, a party member, was elected, becoming the party's and Confederation's first city president.

On 25 March 2026, NN MEP Ewa Zajączkowska-Hernik moved from the ESN group to the Patriots for Europe group (which includes representatives of the RN) in the European Parliament. NN distanced itself from this decision and removed her from the party's membership list.

== Ideology and position ==
The New Hope is a far-right party. Regarding social issues, the party is conservative, and regarding economic issues, it is right-libertarian. It has been also described as right-wing populist. It has expressed hard Eurosceptic views towards the European Union.

After Mentzen replaced Korwin-Mikke as party leader, the party became more critical of Russia, with Mentzen describing Russia as the main threat to Poland, calling Russian President Vladimir Putin a "murderer and a barbarian" and expressing support for Ukraine in the Russo-Ukrainian War, while being sceptical of increased military aid due to equipment shortages in Poland.

Mentzen has said that the Polish state should take no position on the Gaza war.

Mentzen opposes LGBTQ rights and is against abortion, even in cases of rape.

=== Programme ===
The party's programme preamble calls for:

- rebuilding the basic values of the Polish culture and "Latin civilization" and the Christian moral foundations of society,
- construction of rule of law, fair and efficient governance based on the subsidiarity principle,
- implementation of the "eternal human aspirations for Freedom",
- respect for the private property of citizens and the fruits of their labor,
- striving for the implementation of the Polish national interest in the international arena and optimal conditions for the development of the Republic of Poland,
- strengthening the role of the family and creating favorable conditions for its development.

Other issues mentioned in the program are:

- the adoption of a new Polish constitution which takes into account the "principle of no harm to the willing" and the introduction of a presidential system; strengthening the tripartite division of powers by prohibiting the combination of positions in the legislative, executive and judiciary (especially the functions of a deputy and minister);
- the reduction of the role of the Sejm to the body deciding on the amount of taxes and controlling the executive power, and the reduction of the number of ministries;
- the creation of an eleven-person Council of State elected by the Senate and appointed by the President. According to the group's leader, it would take over the legislative initiative from the government
- elimination of PIT and CIT income taxes as well as inheritance and donation tax, as well as the abolition of compulsory pension and health insurance while respecting acquired rights;
- introducing in the constitution a ban on adopting a budget with a deficit in peacetime; regaining sovereignty which, according to the party, requires abandoning the Treaty of Lisbon and rebuilding the treaty base of the European Union;
- doubling defense spending;
- reintroduction of the death penalty.

== Election results ==
=== Presidential ===
| Election year | Candidate | 1st round | | 2nd round | | Result |
| Election year | Candidate | # of overall votes | % of overall vote | # of overall votes | % of overall vote | Result |
|---|---|---|---|---|---|---|
| 2015 | Janusz Korwin-Mikke | 486,084 | 3.26 (#4) | —N/a | | Lost |
| 2020 | Supported Krzysztof Bosak | 1,317,380 | 6.78 (#4) | —N/a | | Lost |
| 2025 | Sławomir Mentzen | 2,890,530 | 14.82 (#3) | —N/a | | Lost |

=== Sejm ===
| Election | Leader | Votes | % | Seats | +/– | Government |
|---|---|---|---|---|---|---|
| 2015 | Janusz Korwin-Mikke | 722,999 | 4.8 (#7) | 0 / 460 | New | Extra-parliamentary |
| 2019 | Janusz Korwin-Mikke | 448,946 | 2.4 (#5) | 5 / 460 | ▲5 | PiS |
| 2019 | As part of the Confederation coalition, that won 11 seats in total. | | | | | |
| 2023 | Sławomir Mentzen | 551,901 | 2.6 (#5) | 8 / 460 | ▲3 | KO–PL2050–KP–NL |
| 2023 | As part of the Confederation coalition, that won 18 seats in total. | | | | | |

=== European Parliament ===
| Election | Leader | Votes | % | Seats | +/– | EP Group |
|---|---|---|---|---|---|---|
| 2019 | Janusz Korwin-Mikke | 621,188 | 4.55 (#4) | 0 / 52 | New | – |
| 2019 | As part of the Confederation coalition, that didn't win any seat. | | | | | |
| 2024 | Sławomir Mentzen | 1,420,287 | 12.08 (#3) | 3 / 53 | ▲3 | ESN |
| 2024 | As part of the Confederation coalition, that won 6 seats in total. | | | | | |
