= Wolnościowcy =

- Abbreviation: W
- Chairman: Artur Dziambor
- Vice-Chairmen: Jakub Kulesza; Marek Kułakowski
- Founded: 17 March 2022
- Dissolved: 3 March 2024
- Split from: KORWiN
- Headquarters: ul. Szulborska 8/40, 01-104 Warsaw
- Ideology: Right-libertarianism; Paleolibertarianism
- Political position: Right-wing
- National affiliation: Konfederacja (2022); Third Way (2023)
- Colors: Purple; Gold

Website
- wolnosciowcy.pl

Wolnościowcy (Polish pronunciation: [vɔl.nɔɕˈt͡ɕɔ.vtsɨ], W), variously translated as Freedomites, Liberalists, Liberals, Libertarians or the Freedom Party, was a Polish political party created by the former KORWiN members who at first remained within the Confederation Liberty and Independence coalition and parliamentary group, then left on 13 February 2023, following Artur Dziambor being kicked out of the Confederation by the party court. Artur Dziambor was selected as a president of the party, while Jakub Kulesza, Dobromir Sośnierz, Tomasz Grabarczyk and Marek Kułakowski became vice-presidents.

== History ==
Initially, the party's name was Confederation – Pro-Polish Coalition (Polish: Konfederacja – Koalicja Propolska), and it was founded on 5 July 2019 by three MPs of the Confederation - Michał Wawer from the National Movement, as well as Marek Kułakowski and Tomasz Grabarczyk from KORWiN. On 8 March 2022, three MPs of the KORWiN party — Artur Dziambor, Jakub Kulesza and Dobromir Sośnierz, left KORWiN. The three had a dispute with the party's leadership; the reason for the conflict were the pro-Russian declarations of Janusz Korwin-Mikke. Dziambor, the leader of Wolnościowcy, declaring pro-Ukrainian views and stated: “We didn’t like the fact that we constantly had to deal mainly with commenting on the chairman’s comments.”

On 17 March 2022, the party was renamed from Confederation – Pro-Polish Coalition party to Wolnościowcy, and on 10 May, the party officially announced this change. Two weeks later, the party's program and logo were presented, and Artur Dziambor was announced as its president. Jakub Kulesza and Dobromir Sośnierz became vice-presidents of the group. Wolnościowcy initially remained in Confederation, becoming a member party of it and declaring itself to be "fourth leg" of the coalition. On 14 December 2022, Jakub Kulesza was dismissed from his position as chairman of the Confederation's parliamentary group. On 10 February 2023, Artur Dziambor was removed from Confederation. In reaction, Wolnościowcy left the Confederation, becoming an independent party. A day before, Tomasz Grabarczyk, the founder of Confederation - Pro-Polish Coalition from 2019, left Wolnościowcy to remain in KORWiN.

Wolnościowcy accused the New Hope of rigging the Confederation primaries, alleging that they had an arrangement with other parties of the Confederation such as National Movement to have a guaranteed first place on the electoral lists of Confederation. They also argued that the format of the primaries, which required candidates to pay 2,500 PLN and voters 20 PLN to the party was "a form of selling places on the list", and that in effect, "all places have now been filled by Korwin-Mikke's cronies". After leaving, the party wanted to run independently in the election. Wolnościowcy stated their intention to "challenge the far-right", but also complained about their disadvantage, noting that while the Agreement and AGROunia appear in the polls, Wolnościowcy are not listed at all. They declared their willingness to join the list of Civic Coalition or Poland 2050, citing the economically liberal views of these parties.

In May 2023, the party admitted that it was expelled from Confederation rather than having voluntarily left it. It stated that the reason for its expulsion was the party's long conflict with Sławomir Mentzen. It was also revealed that the motion to expel Wolnościowcy was submitted by Bartłomiej Pejo, the son-in-law of Korwin-Mikke. Wolnościowcy also attacked the National Movement for allowing the party to be excluded from the coalition. Wolnościowcy declared their willingness to return to Confederation as soon as Mentzen promised a "deep reset and a setting back time at least 6 months".

In July 2023, Dobromir Sośnierz left the party and returned to Confederation Liberty and Independence. After leaving, Sośnierz relevaled that Poland 2050 and Polish People's Party are considering inviting the leader of Wolnościowcy, Dziambor, to their electoral Third Way electoral list. In September 2023, Dziambor stated that the party would not run in the 2023 Polish parliamentary election given the lack of resources. The same month, Dziambor then joined the Polish Coalition, and declared a change in his views, describing himself as centre-right and taking a middle position between the "devout socialists and devout free-marketers".

In the 2023 Polish parliamentary election, Dziambor ran on the list of Third Way, but failed to secure his seat. However, the Polish People's Party considered his performance impressive, as he won 9,168 votes in the Gdynia constituency he ran in - this was the 3rd highest result on the Third Way's electoral list, despite Dziambor being given the last, bottom place on the list.

In March 2024, the party announced that it had been dissolved. Right after the party's dissolution, Dziambor became a member of the Polish People's Party. As its member, he ran on the lists of the Third Way in the 2024 Polish local elections for the Pomeranian Voivodeship Sejmik, and the 2024 European Parliament election in Poland, both times unsuccessfully. Nevertheless, his defeat in the 2024 local elections was very narrow, which led other Polish People's Party politicians to state that he is considered for the list on the next parliamentary election. In June 2024, Dziambor was appointed a plenipotentiary at the Ministry of Economic Development and Technology, led by Krzysztof Paszyk of the Polish People's Party at the time.

== Election results ==
=== Sejm ===
Election	Votes	%	Seats	+/–
2023	9,168	1.34 (Note: Percentage of votes in the Sejm Constituency no. 26.)	0 / 460	▼2
2023	On the list of the Third Way, which won 65 seats in total.			

== Ideology ==
The party was considered right-wing, free-market fundamentalist, and libertarian in the style of Janusz Korwin-Mikke. Prior to the party's creation, Dziambor was the vice president of KORWiN. After Wolnościowcy were created, it initially remained in Confederation - there, the party argued that Confederation was too soft on Russia, wanted to make it drop the far-right label and move towards the political centre, and represented the libertarian wing of the Confederation. After leaving Confederation, Wolnościowcy declared themselves to be "a true Confederation, not one ruled by the duumvirate of Robert Winnicki and Sławomir Mentzen."

The party declared itself libertarian, and sought to dedicate itself to "truly libertarian economics". Wolnościowcy were classically liberal in the sphere of economy, proposing economic deregulation, privatisation of public services, social spending cuts, radical tax cuts and simplification of taxes. The party wanted to abolish the 500+ Family baby bonus program and replace it with "appropriate tax relief measures". It also opposed a phase-out of fossil fuel vehicles. The party strongly distanced itself from Law and Justice and the United Right, criticizing them for economically left-wing positions. On this account, the party accused Confederation of closely cooperating with Law and Justice and All-Polish Youth, which Wolnościowcy saw as a betrayal of libertarian principles.

Socially, the party advocated for freedom that "goes beyond economic aspects, including freedom of speech and civil liberties". Wolnościowcy focused on direct democracy and personal liberties, proposing drug liberalization, unrestricted freedom of speech, right to keep and bear arms, and electronic voting. The party opposed civil partnerships and same-sex marriage, arguing that the state should not provide an institution of civil marriage or partnerships at all, relegating it to non-state institutions such as the Catholic Church. The party's MP and co-leader Dobromir Sośnierz was described as a "staunch opponent of abortion, regardless of the reasons for it". The party also criticized Grzegorz Braun for his "fight with Christmas trees", when Braun destroyed a christmas tree in public building for having an LGBT-themed tree bauble on it.

It spoke for a pragmatic foreign policy that "takes into account Poland's membership of the Latin civilisation". Wolnościowcy supported Ukraine and condemned Confederation for pro-Russian views, and denounced the coalition for going "fully pro-Putin". They argued that the statements of Grzegorz Braun and Korwin-Mikke, prominent figures in Confederation at the time, were openly anti-Ukrainian and pro-Russian. The leader of Wolnościowcy stated his support for Donald Trump and argued that Russia would not have invaded Ukraine if Trump were re-elected in the 2020 United States presidential election. The party's MPs were critical of the European Union - Sośnierz argued that Poland had become a "scapegoat" of the EU, and stated: "The EU has radically violated the sovereignty of Member States on many issues, including in relation to Poland and Hungary. It is clear that the benefits of EU membership are diminishing, while the obligations are increasing, and in addition, countries are being disciplined and threatened with sanctions." Dziambor also denounced the EU, calling its regulations absurd.
