= 2019–20 Confederation presidential primary =

Polish political primary

2020 Confederation presidential primary
- 18 January 2020
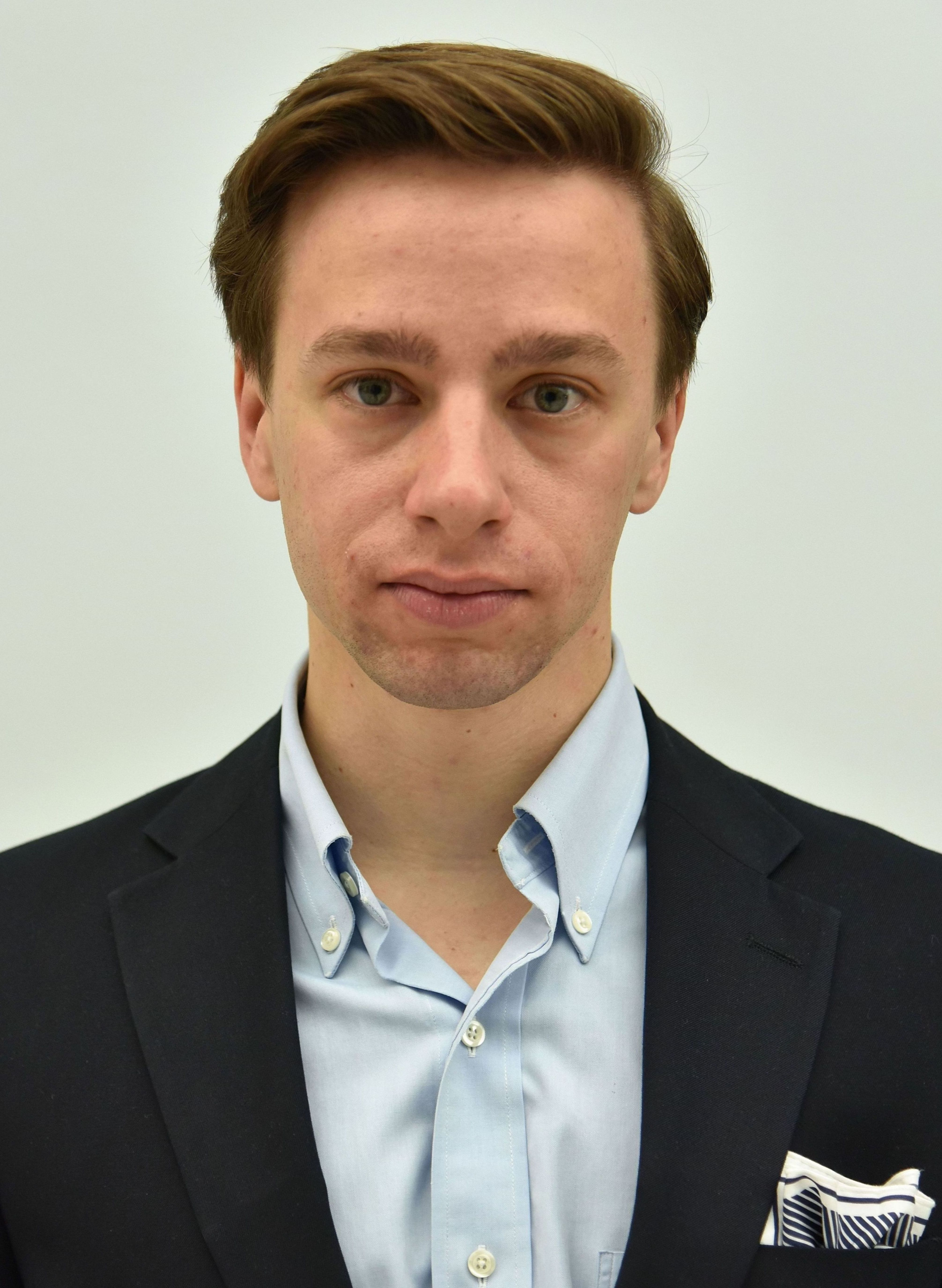

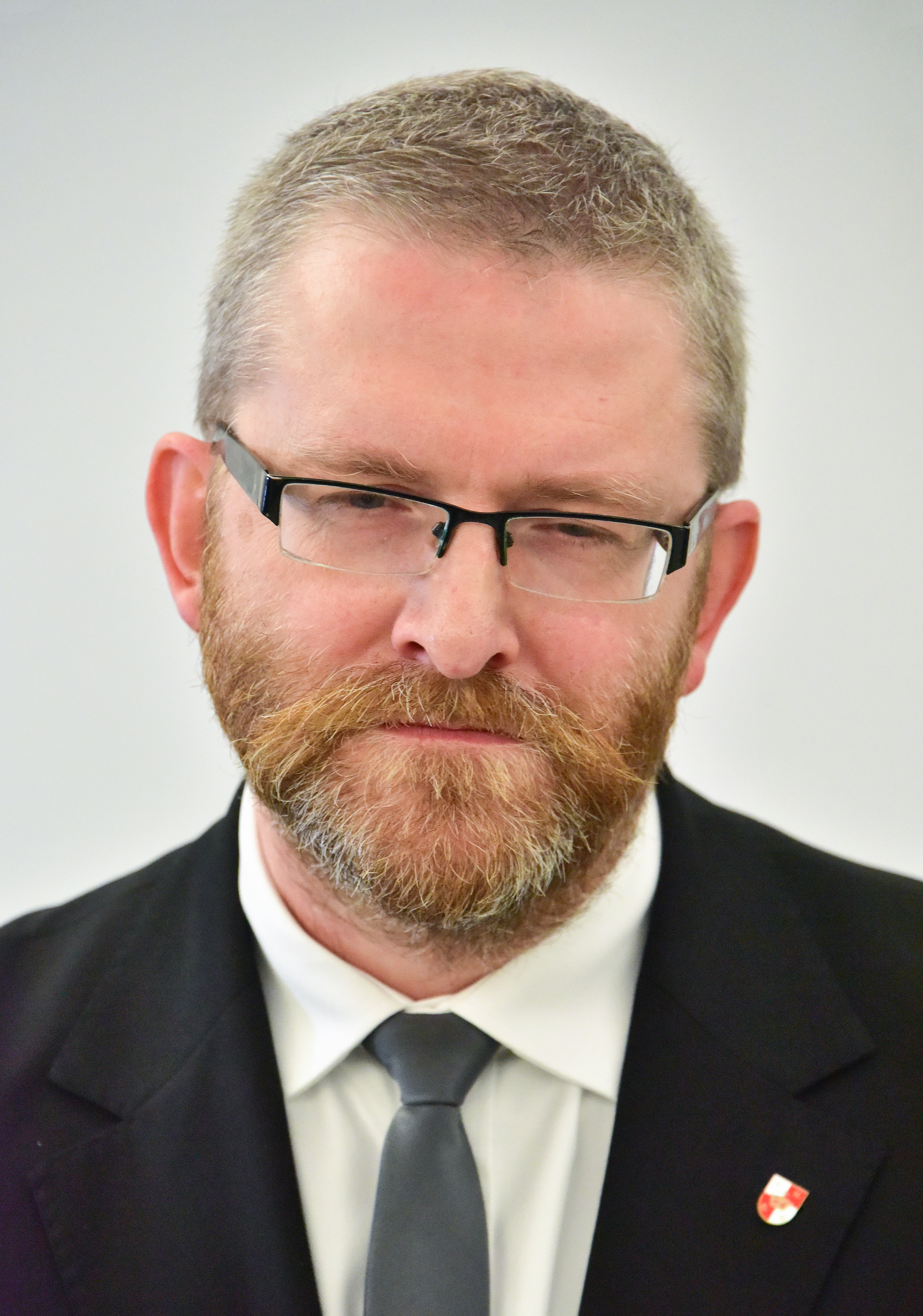

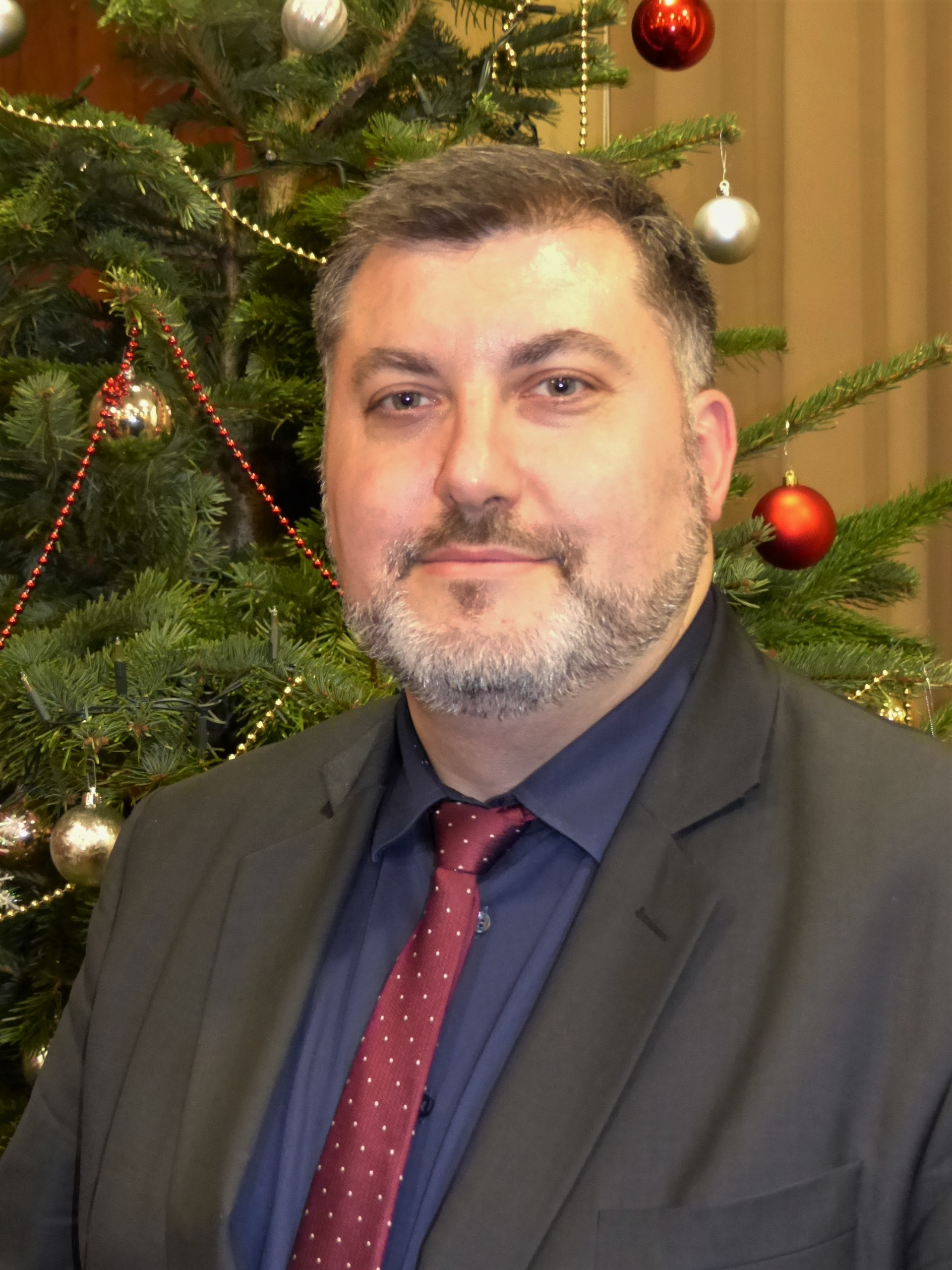

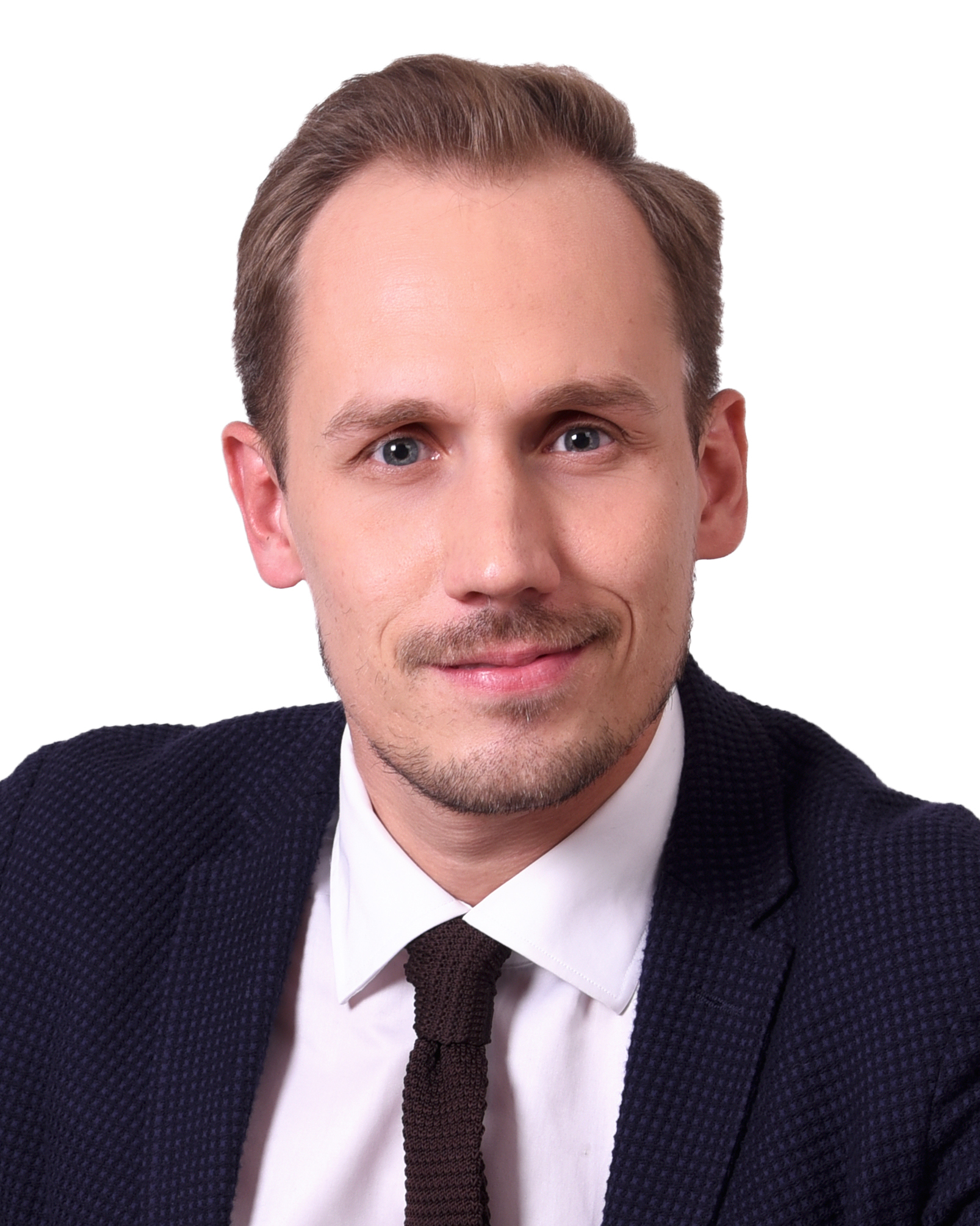

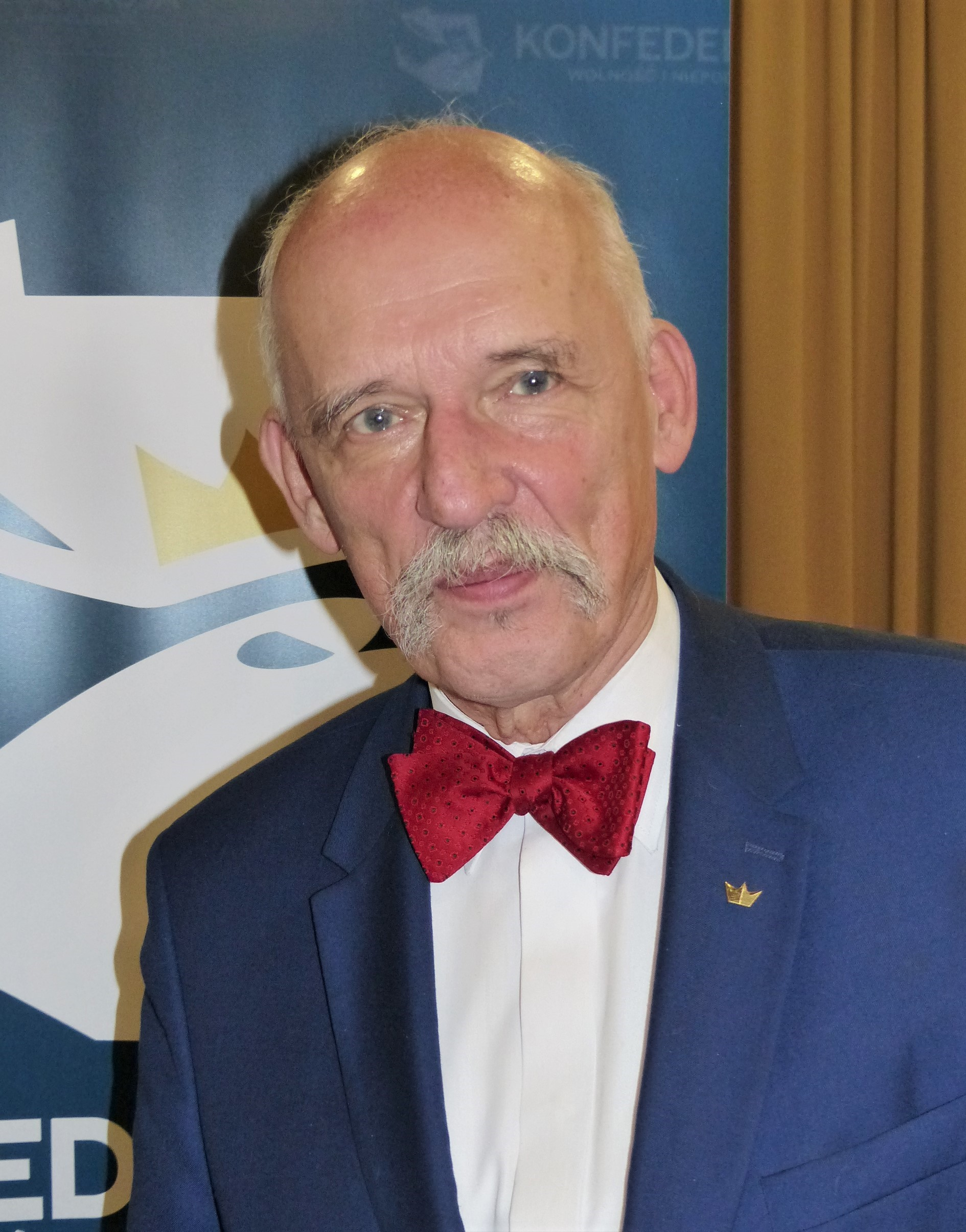

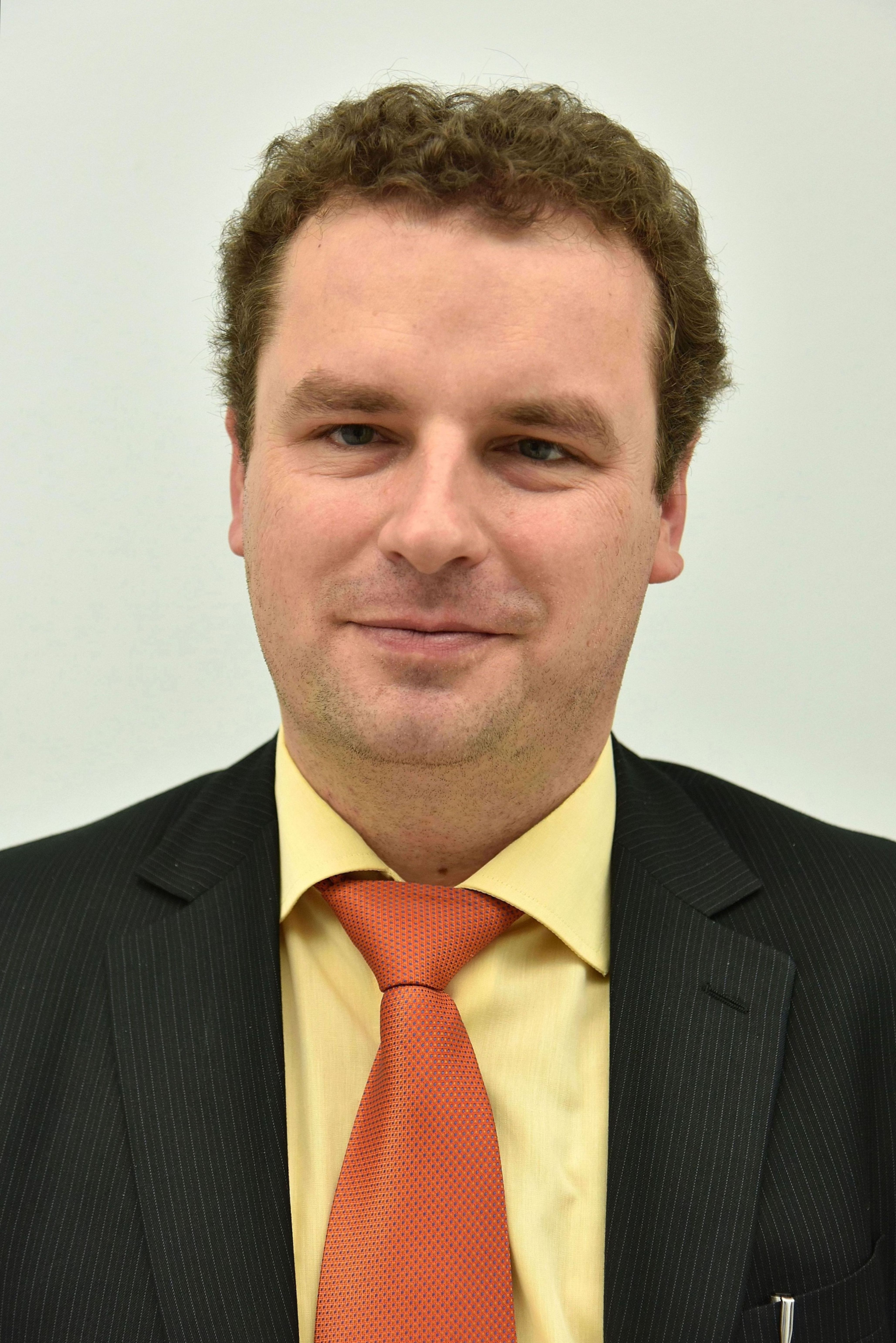
Nominee	Krzysztof Bosak	Grzegorz Braun	Artur Dziambor
Party	RN	KKP	KORWiN
Delegate count	115	77	51
Contests won	14	2	0
Popular vote	2,552	1,690	1,153
Percentage	36.8%	24.3%	16.6%
Nominee	Konrad Berkowicz	Janusz Korwin-Mikke	Jacek Wilk
Party	KORWiN	KORWiN	KORWiN
Delegate count	35	21	9
Contests won	0	0	0
Popular vote	755	423	215
Percentage	10.9%	6.1%	3.1%
- Winner by voivodeship

The 2019–20 Confederation presidential primary was held from November 2019 to January 2020 to decide the coalition's nominee for the 2020 presidential election. It was the first organized presidential primary in Poland since the 2010 Civic Platform presidential primary and the first with an advanced format featuring an American-style delegate system.

== Candidates ==
Candidate	Party	Ideology	Most recent position
Konrad Berkowicz	KORWiN	Libertarian conservatism Paleolibertarianism	Member of the Sejm from Kraków (2019–present)
Krzysztof Bosak	National Movement	Polish nationalism National conservatism	Member of the Sejm from Kielce (2019–present)
Grzegorz Braun	Confederation of the Polish Crown	Monarchism; Reactionism	Member of the Sejm from Rzeszów (2019–present)
Artur Dziambor	KORWiN	Classical liberalism Minarchism	Member of the Sejm from Gdynia (2019–2023)
Janusz Korwin-Mikke	KORWiN	Right-libertarianism; Monarchism	Member of the Sejm from Warsaw (2019–2023)
Paweł Skutecki	Independent	Vaccination choice National liberalism	Member of the Sejm from Bydgoszcz (2015–2019)
Krzysztof Tołwiński	Independent	Agrarianism; National conservatism	Member of the Sejm from Białystok (2010–2011)
Jacek Wilk	KORWiN	Libertarian conservatism Republicanism	Member of the Sejm from Warsaw (2015–2019)
Magdalena Ziętek-Wielomska	Independent	Traditionalist conservatism Integralism	None

== First round ==
=== 7 December 2019: Podlaskie Voivodeship ===
Candidate	Popular vote	Delegates won
Bosak	64 (45.4%)	4
Braun	28 (19.9%)	2
Dziambor	20 (14.2%)	1
Berkowicz	10 (7.1%)	1
Korwin-Mikke	8 (5.7%)	1
Tołwiński	7 (5.0%)	-
Wilk	4 (2.8%)	-
Skutecki	0 (0.0%)	-
Ziętek-Wielomska	0 (0.0%)	-

=== 7 December 2019: Warmian-Masurian Voivodeship ===
Candidate	Popular vote	Delegates won
Bosak	77 (57.9%)	5
Braun	20 (15.0%)	1
Dziambor	12 (9.0%)	1
Berkowicz	10 (7.5%)	1
Wilk	6 (4.5%)	1
Korwin-Mikke	5 (3.8%)	-
Skutecki	2 (1.5%)	-
Tołwiński	1 (0.8%)	-
Ziętek-Wielomska	0 (0.0%)	-

=== 8 December 2019: Pomeranian Voivodeship ===
Candidate	Popular vote	Delegates won
Bosak	112 (33.7%)	7
Dziambor	81 (24.4%)	5
Braun	58 (17.5%)	4
Berkowicz	37 (11.1%)	2
Wilk	21 (6.3%)	1
Korwin-Mikke	17 (5.1%)	1
Ziętek-Wielomska	4 (1.2%)	-
Skutecki	2 (0.6%)	-
Tołwiński	0 (0.0%)	-

=== 8 December 2019: Kuyavian-Pomeranian Voivodeship ===
Candidate	Popular vote	Delegates won
Bosak	78 (32.9%)	5
Braun	47 (19.8%)	3
Dziambor	42 (17.7%)	3
Berkowicz	34 (14.3%)	2
Wilk	12 (5.1%)	1
Korwin-Mikke	10 (4.2%)	1
Skutecki	10 (4.2%)	-
Tołwiński	4 (1.7%)	-
Ziętek-Wielomska	0 (0.0%)	-

=== 14 December 2019: Masovian Voivodeship ===
Candidate	Popular vote	Delegates won
Bosak	454 (40.6%)	18
Braun	225 (20.1%)	9
Dziambor	184 (16.5%)	7
Berkowicz	103 (9.2%)	4
Korwin-Mikke	77 (6.9%)	3
Wilk	38 (3.4%)	1
Skutecki	16 (1.4%)	1
Ziętek-Wielomska	15 (1.3%)	1
Tołwiński	5 (0.4%)	-

=== 14 December 2019: Świętokrzyskie Voivodeship ===
Candidate	Popular vote	Delegates won
Bosak	75 (39.5%)	3
Braun	38 (20.0%)	2
Berkowicz	33 (17.4%)	1
Dziambor	19 (10.0%)	1
Korwin-Mikke	13 (6.8%)	1
Skutecki	7 (3.7%)	-
Wilk	3 (1.6%)	-
Tołwiński	1 (0.5%)	-
Ziętek-Wielomska	1 (0.5%)	-

=== 15 December 2019: Podkarpackie Voivodeship ===
Candidate	Popular vote	Delegates won
Bosak	133 (39.3%)	7
Braun	106 (31.4%)	6
Dziambor	46 (13.6%)	3
Berkowicz	35 (10.4%)	2
Korwin-Mikke	9 (2.7%)	1
Wilk	7 (2.1%)	-
Skutecki	1 (0.3%)	-
Ziętek-Wielomska	1 (0.3%)	-
Tołwiński	0 (0.0%)	-

=== 15 December 2019: Lublin Voivodeship ===
Candidate	Popular vote	Delegates won
Bosak	113 (32.2%)	5
Braun	83 (23.6%)	4
Dziambor	57 (16.2%)	3
Korwin-Mikke	57 (16.2%)	3
Berkowicz	25 (7.1%)	1
Wilk	13 (3.7%)	-
Skutecki	2 (0.6%)	-
Tołwiński	1 (0.3%)	-
Ziętek-Wielomska	0 (0.0%)	-

=== 4 January 2020: Lesser Poland Voivodeship ===
Candidate	Popular vote	Delegates won
Bosak	264 (30.6%)	10
Braun	198 (23.0%)	7
Berkowicz	196 (22.7%)	7
Dziambor	118 (13.7%)	4
Wilk	32 (3.7%)	1
Korwin-Mikke	31 (3.6%)	1
Ziętek-Wielomska	12 (1.4%)	1
Skutecki	11 (1.3%)	-
Tołwiński	0 (0.0%)	-

=== 4 January 2020: Silesian Voivodeship ===
Candidate	Popular vote	Delegates won
Bosak	260 (40.0%)	15
Braun	181 (27.8%)	11
Dziambor	91 (14.0%)	5
Berkowicz	63 (9.7%)	4
Korwin-Mikke	35 (5.4%)	2
Wilk	15 (2.3%)	1
Ziętek-Wielomska	2 (0.3%)	-
Skutecki	2 (0.3%)	-
Tołwiński	1 (0.2%)	-

=== 5 January 2020: Opole Voivodeship ===
Candidate	Popular vote	Delegates won
Braun	39 (27.5%)	2
Bosak	38 (26.8%)	2
Dziambor	31 (21.8%)	1
Berkowicz	19 (13.4%)	1
Wilk	8 (5.6%)	-
Skutecki	4 (2.8%)	-
Korwin-Mikke	2 (1.4%)	-
Ziętek-Wielomska	1 (0.7%)	-
Tołwiński	0 (0.0%)	-

=== 5 January 2020: Lower Silesian Voivodeship ===
Candidate	Popular vote	Delegates won
Bosak	248 (35.9%)	8
Braun	176 (25.5%)	6
Dziambor	127 (18.4%)	4
Berkowicz	68 (9.8%)	2
Korwin-Mikke	47 (6.8%)	1
Wilk	16 (2.3%)	1
Skutecki	6 (0.9%)	-
Ziętek-Wielomska	2 (0.3%)	-
Tołwiński	1 (0.1%)	-

=== 11 January 2020: Łódź Voivodeship ===
Candidate	Popular vote	Delegates won
Bosak	210 (36.0%)	7
Braun	161 (27.6%)	6
Dziambor	110 (18.8%)	4
Berkowicz	44 (7.5%)	2
Korwin-Mikke	31 (5.3%)	1
Wilk	13 (2.2%)	-
Ziętek-Wielomska	9 (1.5%)	-
Skutecki	5 (0.9%)	-
Tołwiński	1 (0.2%)	-

=== 11 January 2020: Greater Poland Voivodeship ===
Candidate	Popular vote	Delegates won
Bosak	243 (36.5%)	10
Braun	172 (25.8%)	7
Dziambor	122 (18.3%)	5
Korwin-Mikke	58 (8.7%)	3
Berkowicz	44 (6.6%)	2
Wilk	19 (2.9%)	1
Ziętek-Wielomska	4 (0.6%)	-
Skutecki	4 (0.6%)	-
Tołwiński	0 (0.0%)	-

=== 12 January 2020: Lubusz Voivodeship ===
Candidate	Popular vote	Delegates won
Bosak	81 (42.4%)	4
Braun	55 (28.8%)	2
Dziambor	29 (15.2%)	1
Berkowicz	14 (7.3%)	1
Korwin-Mikke	5 (2.6%)	-
Wilk	5 (2.6%)	-
Skutecki	2 (1.0%)	-
Ziętek-Wielomska	0 (0.0%)	-
Tołwiński	0 (0.0%)	-

=== 12 January 2020: West Pomeranian Voivodeship ===
Candidate	Popular vote	Delegates won
Braun	103 (32.6%)	4
Bosak	102 (32.3%)	4
Dziambor	64 (20.3%)	2
Berkowicz	20 (6.3%)	1
Korwin-Mikke	18 (5.7%)	1
Ziętek-Wielomska	5 (1.6%)	-
Wilk	3 (0.9%)	-
Tołwiński	1 (0.3%)	-
Skutecki	0 (0.0%)	-

== Primary election results ==
=== Candidates ===
Candidate	Popular vote	Delegates won
Bosak	2552 (36.8%)	115
Braun	1690 (24.3%)	77
Dziambor	1153 (16.6%)	51
Berkowicz	755 (10.9%)	35
Korwin-Mikke	423 (6.1%)	21
Wilk	215 (3.1%)	9
Ziętek-Wielomska	56 (0.9%)	3
Skutecki	74 (1.1%)	2
Tołwiński	23 (0.3%)	1

=== Parties ===
Party	Popular vote	Delegates won
KORWiN	2546 (36.7%)	116
National Movement	2552 (36.8%)	115
Confederation of the Polish Crown	1690 (24.3%)	77
Independents	153 (2.2%)	6

== Convention ==
Results were announced during a convention which took place on 18 January in Warsaw. The winner was Krzysztof Bosak.

Candidate	Round 1		Round 2		Round 3		Round 4		Round 5		Round 6		Round 7	
Candidate	Votes	%	Votes	%	Votes	%	Votes	%	Votes	%	Votes	%	Votes	%
Bosak	115	36.6	114	36.4	117	37.3	110	35.3	110	35.0	118	37.6	163	52.8
Braun	75	23.9	76	24.3	78	24.8	79	25.3	94	29.9	135	43.0	146	47.2
Dziambor	53	16.9	54	17.3	52	16.6	66	21.2	68	21.7	61	19.4		
Berkowicz	33	10.5	35	11.2	35	11.1	35	11.2	42	13.4				
Korwin-Mikke	21	6.7	21	6.7	23	7.3	22	7.0						
Wilk	7	2.2	7	2.2	9	2.9								
Ziętek-Wielomska	4	1.3	6	1.9										
Skutecki	3	1.0												
Tołwiński	3	1.0												

== See also ==
- 2020 Polish presidential election
