= Artur Dziambor =

Polish politician and teacher

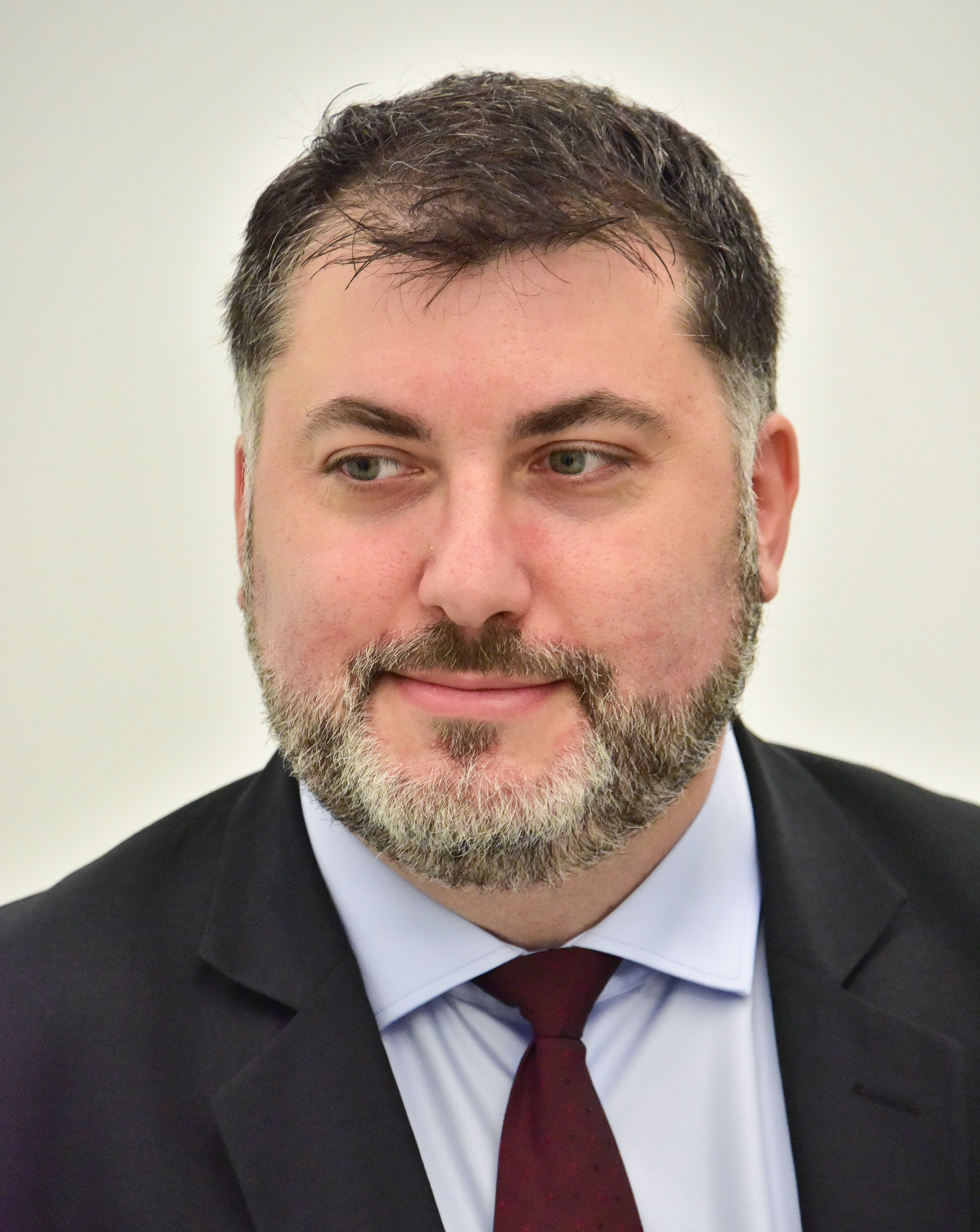
Artur Dziambor

Artur Erwin Dziambor (born 27 January 1982 in Gdynia) is a Polish politician and teacher. He has been a vice-chairman of KORWiN and a deputy in the Sejm since 2019.

In 2019, he was elected to Sejm, starting from the Confederation Freedom and Independence list in the Słupsk constituency. He was a candidate in the 2019–20 Confederation presidential primary. He is 1.96 m tall (6 ft 5 in).

In 2022, he was one of the 3 deputies of the Confederation Liberty and Independence who left the KORWiN coalition due to Korwin-Mikke's stance on Russia. Their new party is called Wolnościowcy (Libertarians).

In 2023 Dziambor joined PSL and was a candidate of the Third Way coalition for the Sejm in the 2023 Polish parliamentary election, representing the Gdynia district, he did not get elected.

In 2024 he again was a Candidate of the Third Way coalition in the 2024 European Parliament election in Poland. He again failed to be elected.
