= Jacek Wilk =

Polish barrister, economist and politician

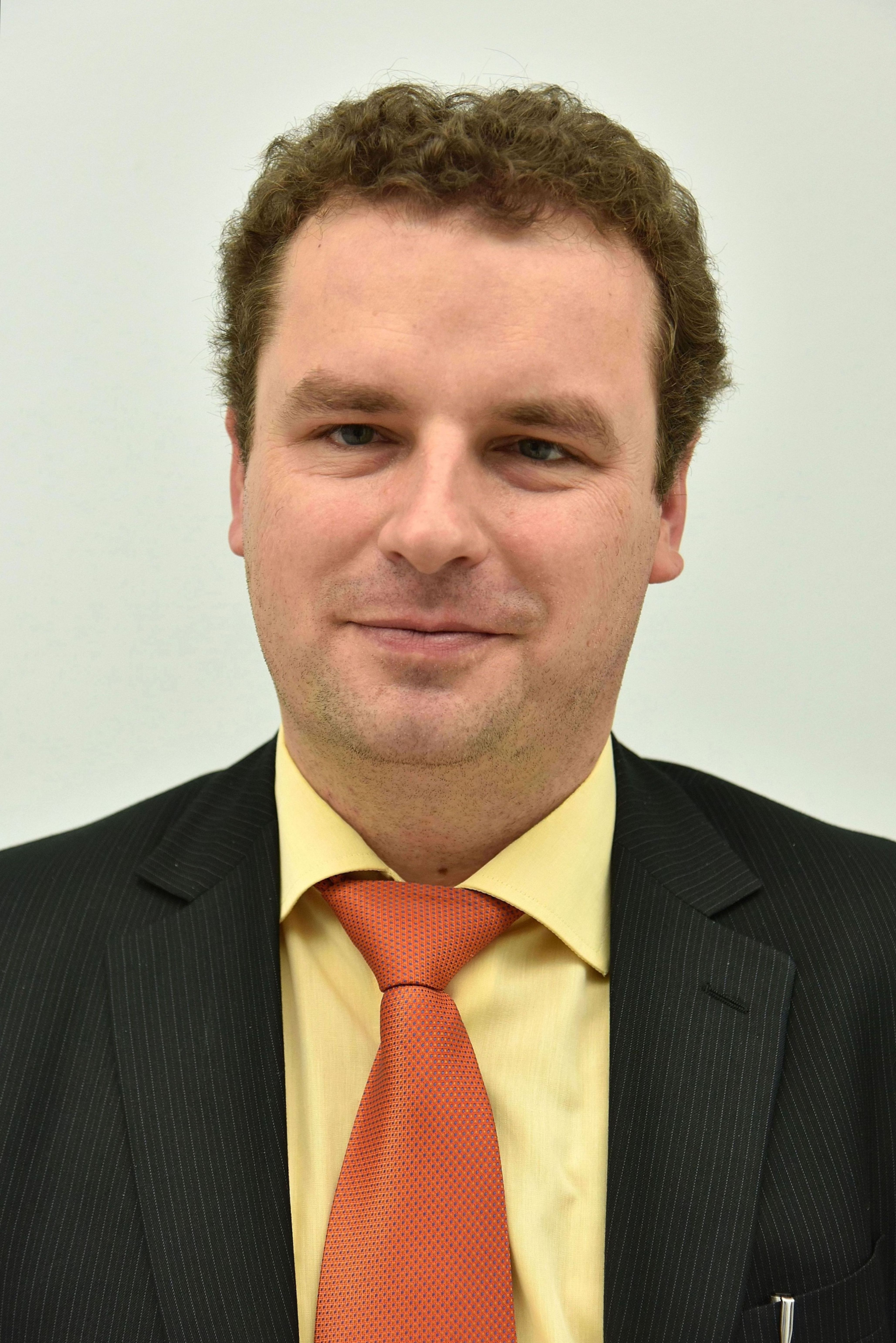
Jacek Wilk

Jacek Wilk (born 17 August 1974 in Kocina, Świętokrzyskie Voivodeship) is a Polish barrister, economist and politician. He was the official candidate of the Congress of the New Right party for the office of President of Poland in the 2015 presidential elections after resigning from supporting its quitting member Janusz Korwin-Mikke. In the first round he received 0.46% of votes, which gave him the tenth place among the candidates.

In 2015, he was elected to Sejm, starting from the Kukiz'15 lists in the Warsaw I constituency. Later he joined Konfederacja. He was not re-elected in 2019. He was a candidate in the 2019–20 Confederation presidential primary but was eliminated after the third round of voting. He then endorsed Krzysztof Bosak, but in the second round he stated his support for Rafał Trzaskowski. In the runoff of the 2025 Polish presidential election, he supported Karol Nawrocki, calling voting for him a duty. On 11 June 2025, Wilk joined Grzegorz Braun's party Confederation of the Polish Crown.
