= Paweł Skutecki =

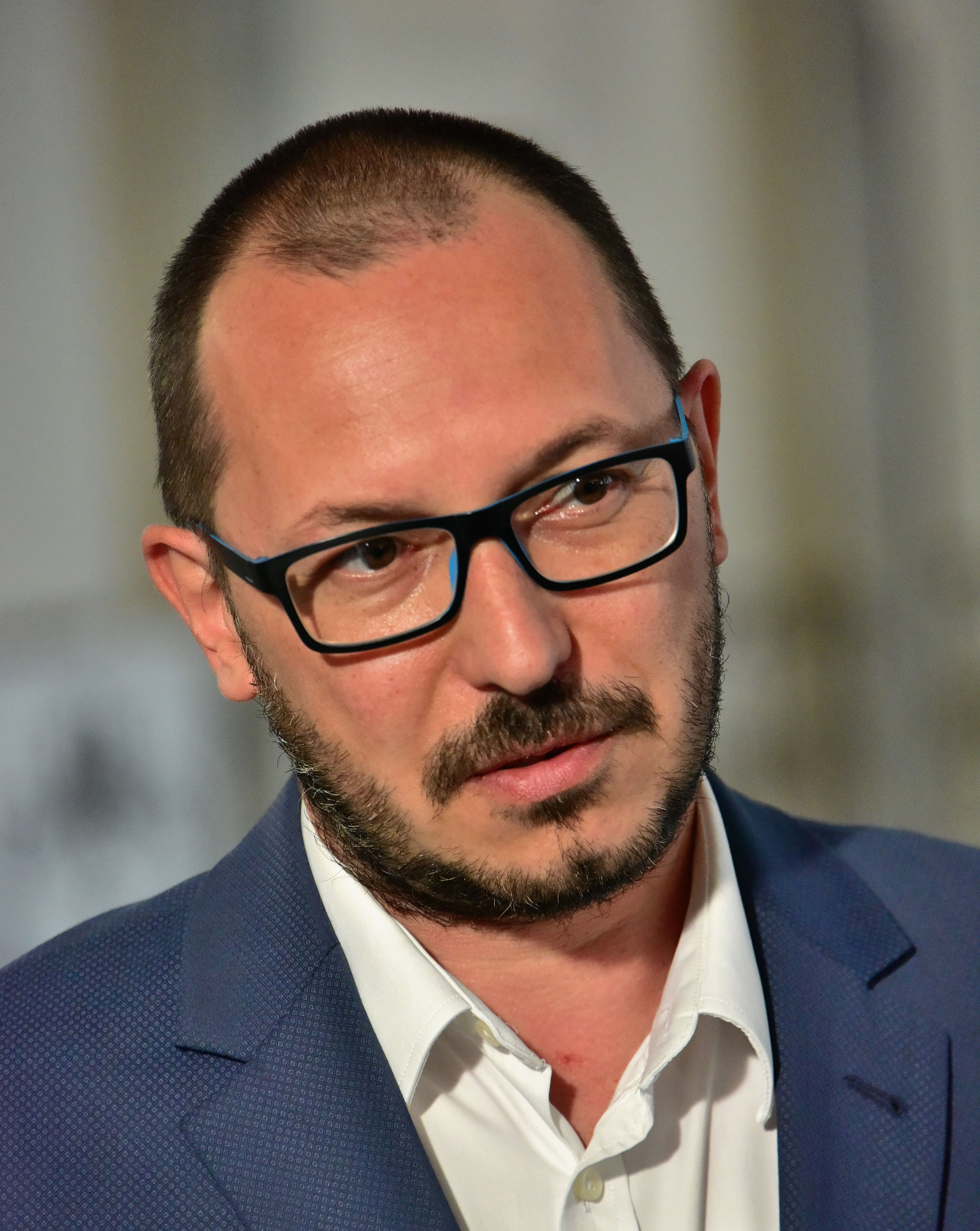
Paweł Skutecki

Paweł Juliusz Skutecki (born 26 February 1975 in Bydgoszcz) is a Polish politician, journalist, anti-vax activist, and former deputy in the Sejm from 2015 to 2019.

In 2015, he was elected to Sejm, starting from the Kukiz'15 list in the Bydgoszcz constituency. He ran for re-election in 2019 starting from the Confederation list but was not elected. He was a candidate in the 2019–20 Confederation presidential primary.
