= Konrad Berkowicz =

Polish politician and computer scientist

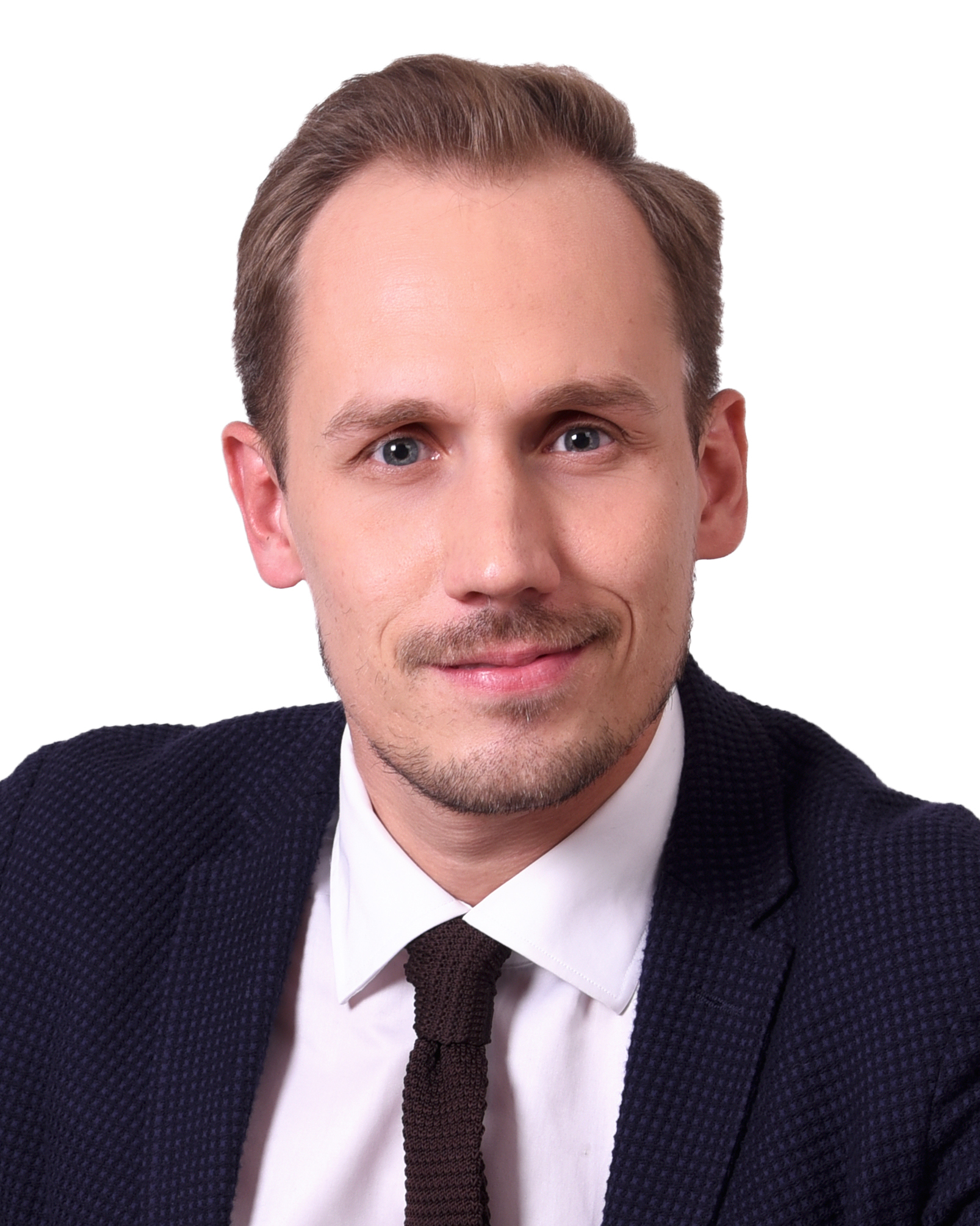
- Konrad Berkowicz (2018)

Member of the Sejm
- Incumbent
- Assumed office 12 November 2019
- Constituency: 13 – Kraków

Personal details
- Born: 27 May 1984 (age 42) Kraków, Poland
- Party: New Hope
- Other political affiliations: Confederation Liberty and Independence

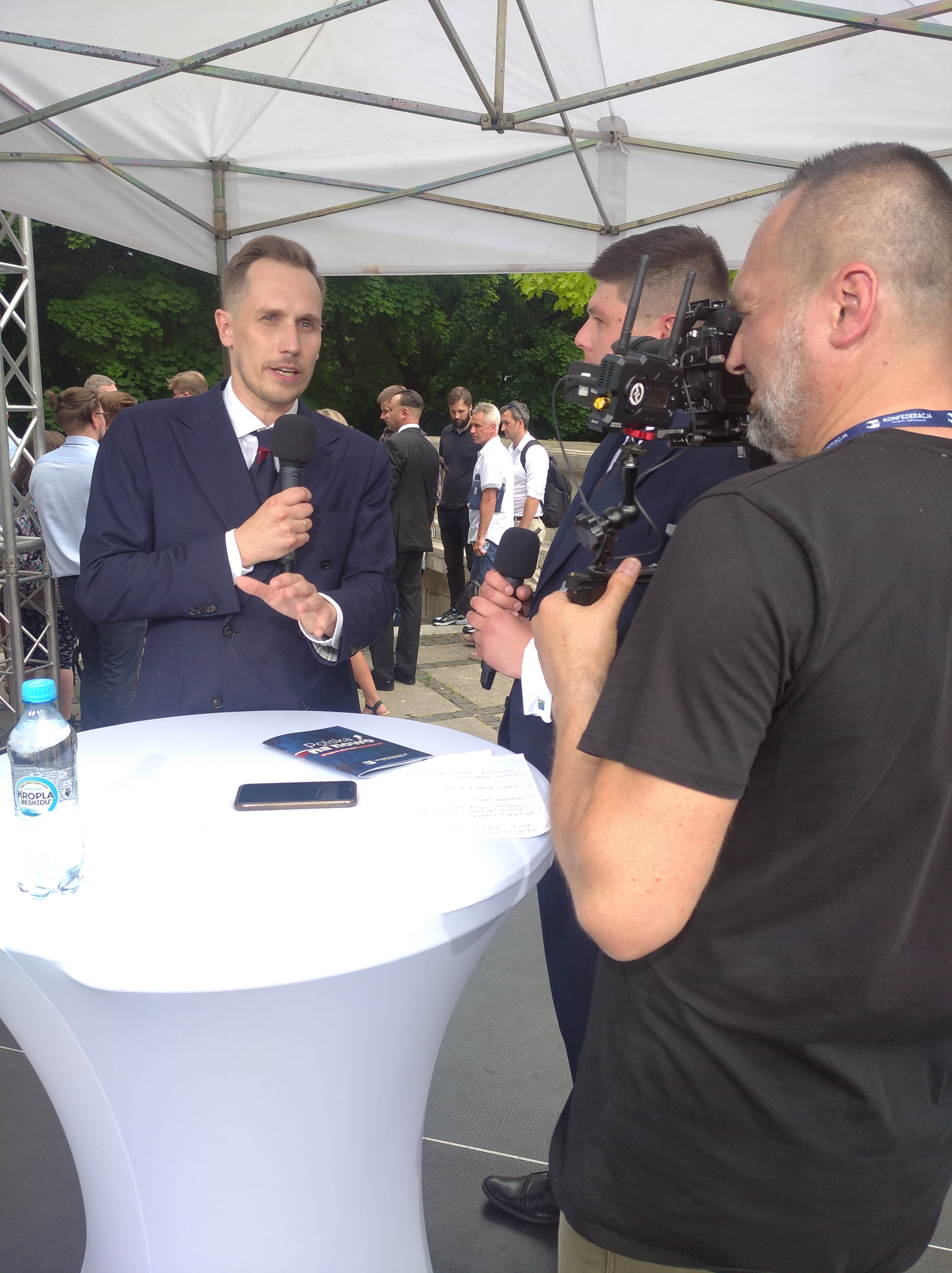
Konrad Berkowicz.

Konrad Szczepan Berkowicz (born 27 May 1984) is a Polish politician. In 2015 he became the vice-chairman of KORWiN, aka 'The New Hope', a far-right political party in Poland in 2015, and the deputy of the Sejm in 2019.

== Early life ==
Berkowicz was born in Krakow and raised in Trzcinica near Jasło. He is the son of Adam and Bożena Berkowicz, both of whom were dance teachers. In his youth, Berkowicz also worked as a dance teacher and practiced ballroom dancing. He has four siblings.

Berkowicz holds bachelor and master's degrees in philosophy from the University of Warsaw.

== Political career ==
In 2018, Berkowicz ran for mayor of Kraków but was unsuccessful.

In 2019, he was elected to the Sejm, starting from the Confederation Freedom and Independence list in the Kraków II constituency. He was a candidate in the 2019–20 Confederation presidential primary.

In the 2023 parliamentary elections, Berkowicz was re-elected to the Sejm with 36,918 votes. During the 10th term, he served, among other roles, as vice-chairman of the Senior Policy Commission. In 2024, he again ran unsuccessfully for mayor of Kraków, and later that year he also made an unsuccessful bid in the European Parliament elections.

== Controversies ==
In October 2025, he was fined by the Polish Police for attempting to steal products with a total value of PLN 394.95 from an IKEA furniture store in Krakow. Berkowicz accepted the fine and did not use his parliamentary immunity. He later explained his actions as carelessness when scanning the products.

On 14 April 2026, during a debate in the Sejm, Berkowicz sparked controversy by displaying an Israeli flag in which the Star of David was replaced with a swastika. During his speech, he referred to Israel as a new Third Reich, accused it of committing genocide in Gaza, and war crimes "with particular cruelty", including the use of white phosphorus in Gaza and Lebanon. Berkowicz also said that the number of children who have died [in Gaza] is dozens of times higher than during the entire war in Ukraine. Israel as well as the European Jewish Congress strongly condemned Berkowicz's actions, calling them "antisemitic horror", "Holocaust inversion" and "antisemitic provocation". Włodzimierz Czarzasty, Deputy Speaker of the Polish parliament, said that Berkowicz's actions were "in no way justified".

== Personal life ==
Berkowicz is married and became a father in 2024.
