= Krzysztof Bosak =

Polish politician (born 1982)

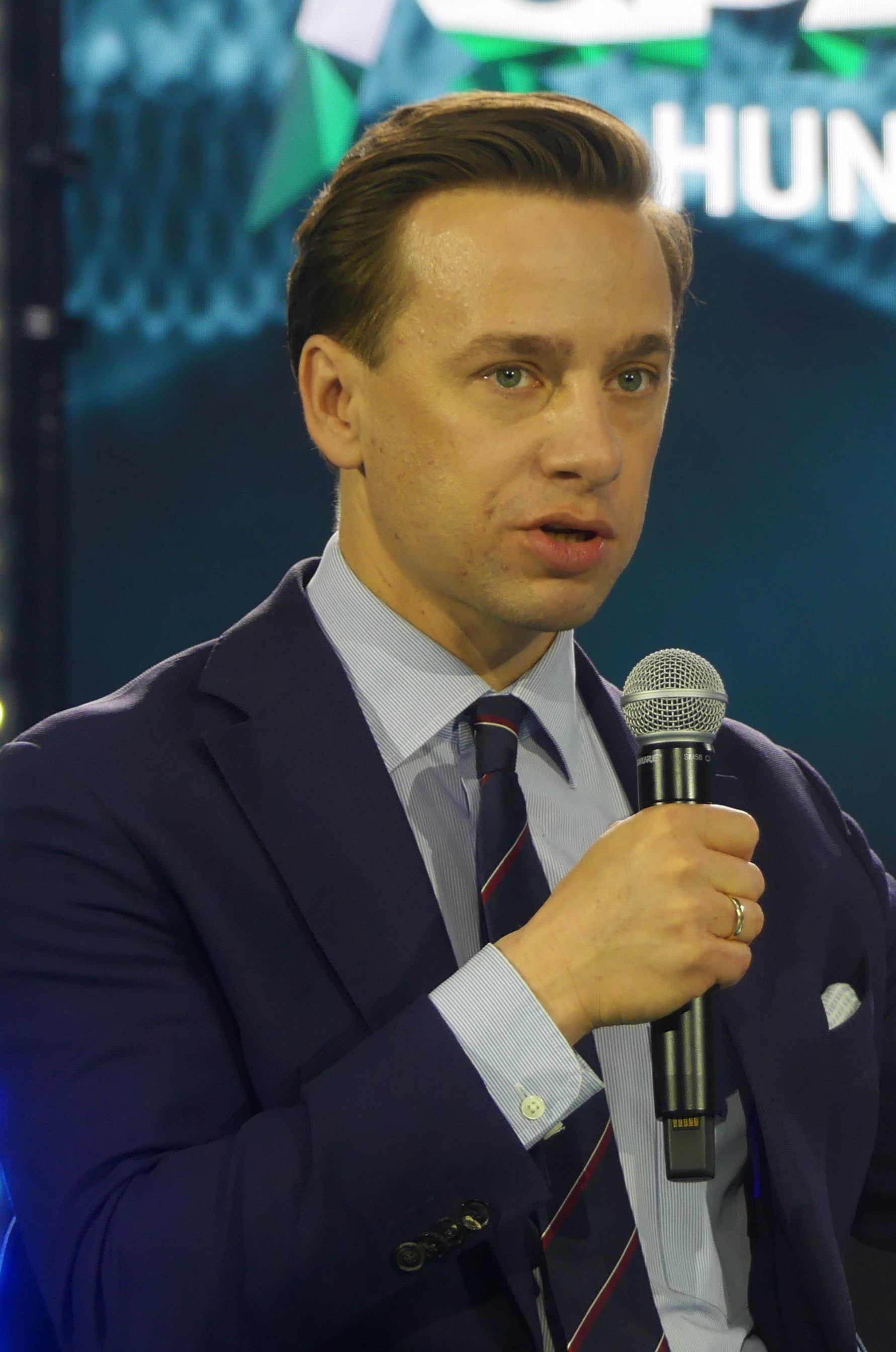
- Bosak in 2025

Deputy Marshal of the Sejm
- Incumbent
- Assumed office 13 November 2023
- Marshal: Szymon Hołownia; Włodzimierz Czarzasty

Chairman of the National Movement
- Incumbent
- Assumed office 12 May 2023
- Preceded by: Robert Winnicki

Member of the Sejm
- Incumbent
- Assumed office 12 November 2019
- Constituency: 33 – Kielce (2019–2023); 24 – Białystok (2023–)
- In office 25 September 2005 – 4 November 2007
- Constituency: 8 – Zielona Góra

Personal details
- Born: 13 June 1982 (age 44) Zielona Góra, Lubusz Voivodeship, Polish People’s Republic
- Party: National Movement (since 2012)
- Other political affiliations: Confederation (since 2019); League of Polish Families (2001–2008)
- Spouse: Karina Bosak (m. 2020)
- Children: 4
- Education: Wrocław University of Science and Technology (didn't graduate)
- Website: Campaign website

Krzysztof Bosak ([ˈkʂɨʂtɔf ˈbɔsak], born 13 June 1982) is a Polish far-right politician. He serves as the Deputy Marshal of the Sejm of the Republic of Poland. He was a member of the Sejm for the League of Polish Families from 2005 to 2007 and has been a member of the Sejm again since 2019 for the Confederation. Bosak was the chairman of the All-Polish Youth from 2005 to 2006 and was one of the founders and the current chairman of the National Movement. He was a candidate for president in 2020.

== Early life and education ==
Bosak was born in Zielona Góra. He trained acrobatics in his youth, as well as windsurfing, and was a sailing instructor. He joined the Polish Scouting and Guiding Association (ZHP).

From 2001 to 2004, he studied architecture at Wrocław University of Science and Technology. He also studied philosophy as well, but did not complete any of his studies. From 2004 to 2008, he studied economics at the SGH Warsaw School of Economics. He later studied at Collegium Humanum, but quit when he became aware of the issues concerning C.H. studies.

== Political career ==
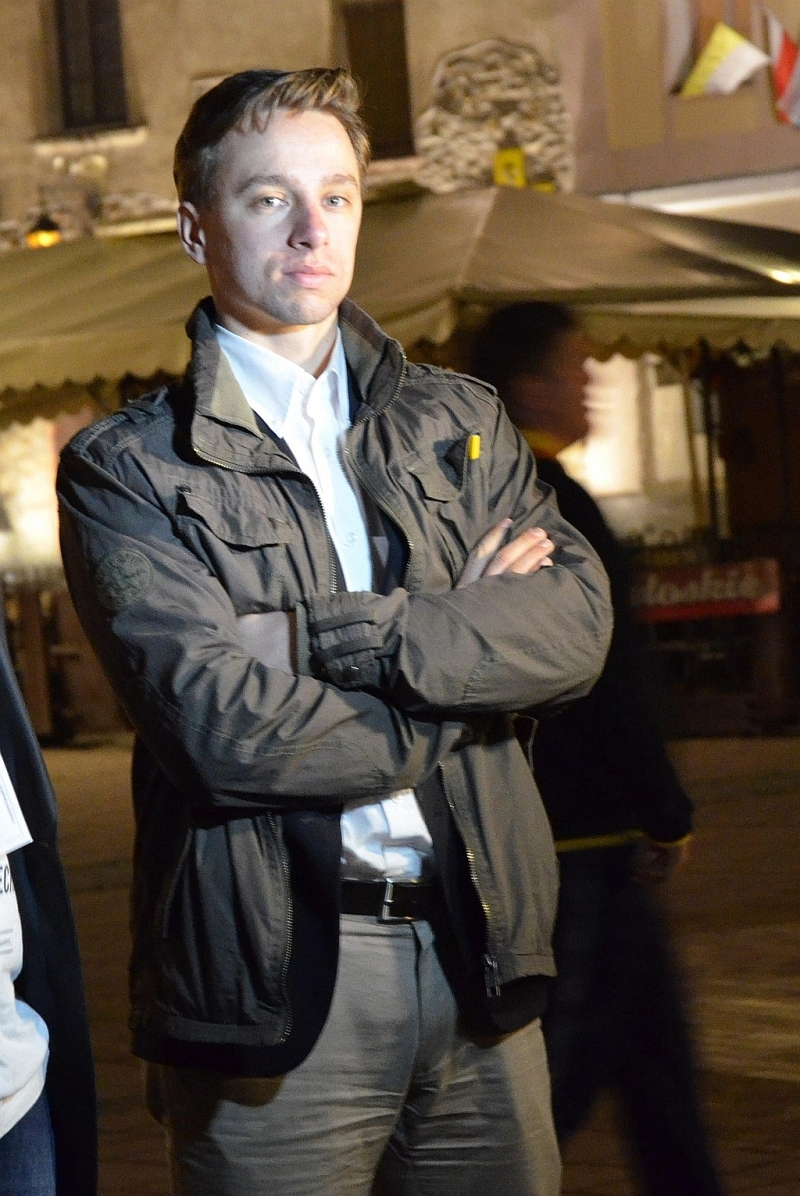
Bosak at a rally in honor of Witold Pilecki in 2014

He was elected to the Sejm on 25 September 2005, getting 3764 votes in 8 – Zielona Góra as a candidate from the League of Polish Families list. Thus, he was the second-youngest person ever elected to the Polish Sejm. He took part in the sixth Polish edition of Dancing with the Stars.

On 13 June 2008, he resigned his membership of the League of Polish Families and backed out from political life. In 2011, he took part in Congress of the New Right but never joined the party. Later he became one of the founders of the National Movement.

He contested the 2019 European Parliament election, but was not elected as the coalition did not pass the electoral threshold of 5%.

In the 2019 Polish parliamentary election, he was elected member of the Sejm. He received 22,158 votes in the 33- Kielce. He was named the vice-chairman and spokesperson for Confederation in the Sejm.

He was a candidate in the 2020 Confederation presidential primary. He has a strong support among the many factions in his political group as well as the general public. He won the nomination held at the party convention in Warsaw on 18 January. In the election he finished in fourth place receiving 6.8% and over 1.3 million votes.

In the 2023 Polish parliamentary election he headed the election list of the Confederation Freedom and Independence in the Białystok parliamentary constituency.

On 13 December 2023, a motion was submitted to the Sejm to dismiss Bosak from the position of Deputy Marshal of the Sejm. It was indicated in the motion that Bosak enabled Grzegorz Braun to deliver an anti-Semitic speech in which, among other things, he referred to the ceremony of lighting Hanukkah candles as "racist." However, Bosak did condemn Braun's actions against the Hanukkah ceremony, describing them as "tarnishing our good name".

In April 2025, the Never Again Association published a report about praising the racist killer Janusz Walus by far-right in Poland. According to this report Bosak spoke positively about Walus, stated, among others, that he ‘has been respected by right-wing circles for decades’.

== Political stances ==
Bosak is a hard eurosceptic who is pursuing a Polish withdrawal from the EU. He identifies as a national conservative and a traditional Catholic. In his view, the major right-wing parties of Western Europe have capitulated to the liberal revolution and no longer promote conservative values. He is also critical of the Law and Justice party, which, according to him, will most likely follow the same path as right-wing parties in the West.

== Electoral history ==
=== Presidential ===
| Election | Endorsed by | First round | | | Second round | | | Ref |
| Election | Endorsed by | Votes | % | Position | Votes | % | Position | Ref |
|---|---|---|---|---|---|---|---|---|
| 2020 | Confederation | 1,317,380 | 6.78 | #4 | Did not advance | | | |

== Personal life ==
In February 2020, Bosak married Karina Walinowicz, who took his surname upon marriage. At the time, she was a lawyer and political activist working with Ordo Iuris, a conservative Catholic legal organisation. She was elected to the Sejm in 2023, making them one of only two married couples simultaneously serving in the Sejm. As of 2026, Bosak and his wife have three sons and a daughter.

== See also ==
- Karina Bosak
