= National Movement (Poland) =

Far-right political party in Poland

National Movement Ruch Narodowy
- President: Krzysztof Bosak
- Vice Presidents: Anna Bryłka; Krzysztof Tuduj; Michał Wawer; Witold Tumanowicz; Paweł Usiądek
- Founded: 11 November 2012 (as an organization); 10 December 2014 (as a political party)
- Registered: 11 February 2015; 28 February 2018 (again)
- Dissolved: 16 January 2017
- Headquarters: ul. Stanisława Noakowskiego 10/12, 00-666 Warsaw
- Ideology: Ultranationalism; National conservatism; Neo-fascism; Social conservatism; Euroscepticism
- Political position: Far-right
- Religion: Roman Catholicism
- National affiliation: Confederation Liberty and Independence
- European affiliation: Patriots.eu
- European Parliament group: Patriots for Europe
- Colours: Red
- Sejm: 7 / 460
- Senate: 0 / 100
- European Parliament: 2 / 53
- Regional assemblies: 0 / 552

Website
- ruch-narodowy.pl

The National Movement (Polish: Ruch Narodowy [rux na.rɔˈdɔ.vɨ], RN) is a far-right political party in Poland. It is led by Krzysztof Bosak. It claims spiritual descendance from the prewar movement of Roman Dmowski, the National Democracy, which was also commonly called the National Movement.

It was founded in 2012 as an organization, and in 2014 it was registered as a political party. It is a part of the Confederation Liberty and Independence, and it currently has seven members in the Sejm. It is a far-right political party and it is orientated towards socially conservative and militarist stances.

== National congress meetings ==
The First Congress of the National Movement took place on 8 June 2013 in Warsaw. Guest of honor at the congress was Rafał Ziemkiewicz. Representatives of the groups co-create the movement and signed the declaration of ideological National Movement.

The Second Congress of the National Movement took place on 3 May 2014 in Warsaw. Honorary guests of the congress were Leszek Zebrowski, Stanisław Michalkiewicz and Márton Gyöngyösi of the Hungarian Jobbik. Also the guest list included the party's other international allies: Roberto Fiore of Forza Nuova (Italian: New Force), and the leaders of the Spanish Democracia Nacional. The congress passed the following demands of the program:

- merging of income tax and social insurance contributions into one
- elimination of pay-for-all social security system
- "Citizen Retirement Programme" (providing a flat-rate pension, independent of earlier earnings and hours of work)
- tax-free sum granted for each child in the family
- reduction of income tax levied on micro, small and medium-sized businesses
- restoration of turnover tax in lieu of corporate income tax
- the establishment of a constitutional debt which limits public finances
- full transparency of public finances (including contracts and salaries in the public sector)
- modernization of the Polish Armed Forces
- the introduction of a universal territorial defence unit and a shooting range in every county
- expand access to firearms
- ensure the constitution guarantees national ownership of Polish land
- denunciation of the Treaty of Lisbon and replace it with a "Sovereignty Treaty"
- termination of the energy-climate agreements and the European Fiscal Compact
- promotion of Polish history in the world (including the fight against the term "Polish concentration camps")
- public combat of the so-called "ideology of gender"
- striving for energy independence (support for the extraction of shale gas and nuclear power plants)

== Ideology ==
The National Movement is positioned on the far-right on the political spectrum. It is an ultranationalist, Polish nationalist, national-conservative and neo-fascist party. It is explicitly socially conservative, it has militarist tendencies, and has also expressed hard Eurosceptic sentiment.

=== Program ===
As adopted in the January 2013 declaration of ideology, the decision-making council of the National Movement has indicated its three main components: identity (nation, family, people), sovereignty (the state, culture, economy) and freedom (of speech, management, people); identified the awareness and commitment of the young generation of Poles as the strength of the National Movement and pledged to work on the transformation of the homeland, emphasized the idea of the nation, understood as a cultural community formed by generations. National Movement advocates fight for the sovereignty of the country, to repair the political and economic state and defending the freedom of its citizens, as well as the realisation in the sphere of culture and politics of traditional values. The purpose of the Movement is a fundamental social change – the so-called "Overthrow of the republic of the Round Table". It declares itself as a social movement which is a network of community initiatives for state sovereignty and national identity.

The progress of civilisation, which was to take place in Poland thanks to EU funds, is treated as a partial compensation for the losses that Poland suffered in connection with the unilateral opening of the market in the pre-accession period, while Polish banking sector depends on foreign capital.

=== Economy ===
The outline of the economic program was presented by Krzysztof Bosak during the second congress of the Movement. According to the RN, it is possible to combine a wide range of economic freedoms with constructive approach to the state, furnished on the basis of the principles of thrift and subsidiarity. The establishment of the Institute for National Strategy, will bring together experts and work out a modern program for the National Movement.

The movement is opposed to the introduction of the euro in Poland.

=== Foreign policy ===
The National Movement is a eurosceptic grouping.

In a joint statement with the Hungarian Jobbik on the situation in Ukraine, they have indicated a desire to deepen cooperation between the two groups. They announced the Polish-Hungarian exchange of lists of candidates for election to the European Parliament in 2014 (which ultimately did not happen). Hungarian and Polish nationalists believe that national governments devote national interests in favour of eurofederalism. In this particular case, both national movements called together the national authorities of their countries for political and diplomatic efforts to protect the endangered rights of national minorities in Ukraine due to the revolutionary mood in the east, including promoting the symbolism and characters associated with the Ukrainian ethnic chauvinism that in the context of historical experience violently celebrated national minorities in these lands.

In 2015, the National Movement invited members of Jobbik and the Italian neo-fascist party Forza Nuova, together with its youth wing Lotta Studentesca, to visit the Sejm in Poland.

The National Movement initially wanted to improve relations with Russia, considering it as a superpower and claiming that it was not a threat to Poland on any level, as well as supporting the reconstruction of commercial relations with Russia. It also believed that the presence of allied NATO and American troops is "the reverse of allied support, which strengthens Poland's dependence and dependability in its defense capabilities". It instead proposed to work with Russia and China as an antidote to the influence of the United States and Germany, calling it a "multi-vector policy".

However, following critical Russian remarks regarding Polish conduct during the Second World War, the National Movement's stance has become more negative towards Russia. The party has disavowed the pro-Russian stance of its political ally Janusz Korwin-Mikke and condemned the Russian annexation of Crimea. The party has suggested Russia was coordinating with Israel, which has expressed similar criticisms of Polish conduct during the Second World War. Following the 2022 Russian invasion of Ukraine, Bosak called for banning Russia from SWIFT and stopping visas for Russian nationals. Winnicki has described Russia as an "existential threat to Polish interests". The party's vice-president, Anna Bryłka, has described Russia and Belarus as engaged in a "hybrid war" against Poland, and has stated the party is opposed to Nord Stream 2 and restoration of diplomatic relations with Russia.

=== LGBT rights ===
The party opposes same sex rights and pro-LGBT marches, and its leaders have described homosexuality as "a disease", frequently arranging counter demonstrations.

== Participation in elections ==
=== Elections to the European Parliament in 2014 ===
The National Movement announced their desire to take part in the elections to the European Parliament on 7 January 2014 which were to be held in the same year. The movement's policies for these elections were: Building a "Europe of Homelands" through annulling the Lisbon Treaty, furthering the anti-gender campaign, promoting Polish historical policy at the EU level, striving for the rights of Poles abroad (especially in Lithuania), withdrawal from the climate package, and promoting Polish mining and coal-based energy. The National Movement fielded candidates in all constituencies. In the elections 98,626 people voted for the National Movement, which gave it 1.4% of the vote (ninth place overall).

=== Senate by-elections in 2014 ===
In the by-election to district No. 47 of the Senate on 7 September 2014, the candidate of the National Movement, Krzysztof Bosak, received 6.42% of votes, which placed him in third place out of six candidates.

=== Presidential elections in 2015 ===
In the Polish presidential election in 2015, the party fielded a candidate, Marian Kowalski, a columnist and bodybuilder. He was eliminated in the first-round with only 77,630 votes, a 0.52% share.

=== Parliamentary elections 2015 ===
In the 2015 parliamentary election, the RN cooperated with Kukiz'15, whose five of 42 seats were held by National Movement members. In April 2016 National Movement management decided to leave Kukiz's movement, but only one MP followed party instruction. Those who stayed in Kukiz'15 formed association "National Democracy" (Endecja) along with a few other Kukiz'15 MPs.

=== Elections to the European Parliament in 2019 ===
In 2019, the National Movement has created an anti-European Union coalition called Konfederacja Korwin Liroy Braun Narodowcy. The coalition got 621,188 votes (4.55%).

=== Parliamentary elections 2019 ===
For the 2019 elections, the National Movement continued to be part of the Confederation and the coalition was one of only five electoral committees with candidates in all electoral districts. This time they made it into the Sejm with 6.81% of the vote. The coalition got 11 MPs, of which five belong to the National Movement.

=== Presidential elections in 2020 ===
For the Polish presidential election in 2020, the Confederation had a primary. Vice-chairman Krzysztof Bosak ran in the primary as the candidate for the National Movement. He won the primary and was nominated by the Confederation on 18 January.

== Election results ==
=== Presidential ===
Election	Candidate	1st round		2nd round	
Election	Candidate	# of overall votes	% of overall vote	# of overall votes	% of overall vote
2015	Marian Kowalski	77,630	0.52 (#9)		
2020	Krzysztof Bosak	1,317,380	6.78 (#4)		
2025	Sławomir Mentzen	2,890,530	14.82 (#3)		

=== Sejm ===
Election	Leader	Votes	%	Seats	Change	Government
2015	Robert Winnicki	1,339,094	8.8(#3)	3 / 460	New	PiS
2015	As part of Kukiz'15, that won 42 seats in total.					
2019	Robert Winnicki	1,256,953	6.8 (#5)	5 / 460	▲2	PiS
2019	As part of the Confederation coalition, that won 11 seats in total.					
2023	Krzysztof Bosak	1,547,364	7.2 (#5)	7 / 460	▲2	KO–PL2050–KP–NL
2023	As part of the Confederation coalition, that won 18 seats in total.					

=== European Parliament ===
Election	Leader	Votes	%	Seats	+/–	EP Group
2014	Robert Winnicki	98,626	1.47 (#9)	0 / 52	New	–
2019	Robert Winnicki	621,188	4.55 (#4)	0 / 52	New	–
2019	As part of the Confederation coalition, that didn't win any seat.					
2024	Krzysztof Bosak	1,420,287	12.08 (#3)	2 / 53	▲2	PfE
2024	As part of the Confederation coalition, that won 6 seats in total.					

== Sources ==
- Tokarz, Grzegorz (2002). Ruch narodowy w Polsce w latach 1989–1997. Wydawnictwo Uniwersytetu Wrocławskiego
