= Results breakdown of the 2019 Polish parliamentary election (Sejm) =

Breakdown of election results

This is the results breakdown of the Sejm election held in Poland on 13 October 2019. The following tables show detailed results by each party in electoral coalitions, as well as constituency results.

== Nationwide ==
Seats won by Sejm district.

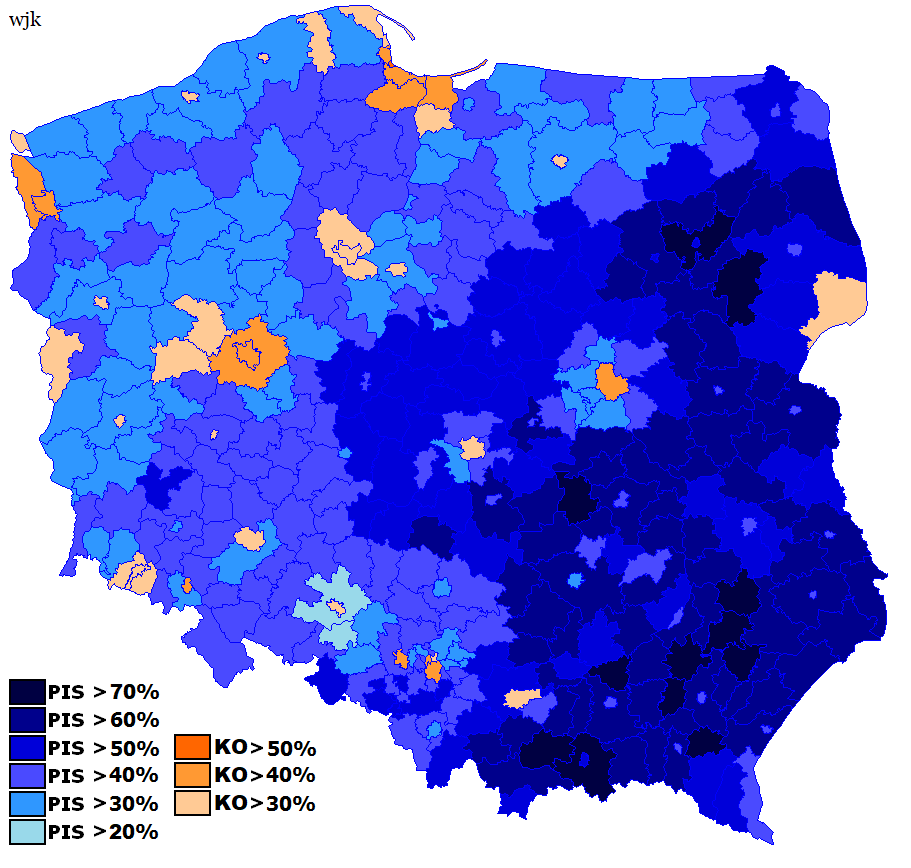
Results of the Sejm election by powiats.

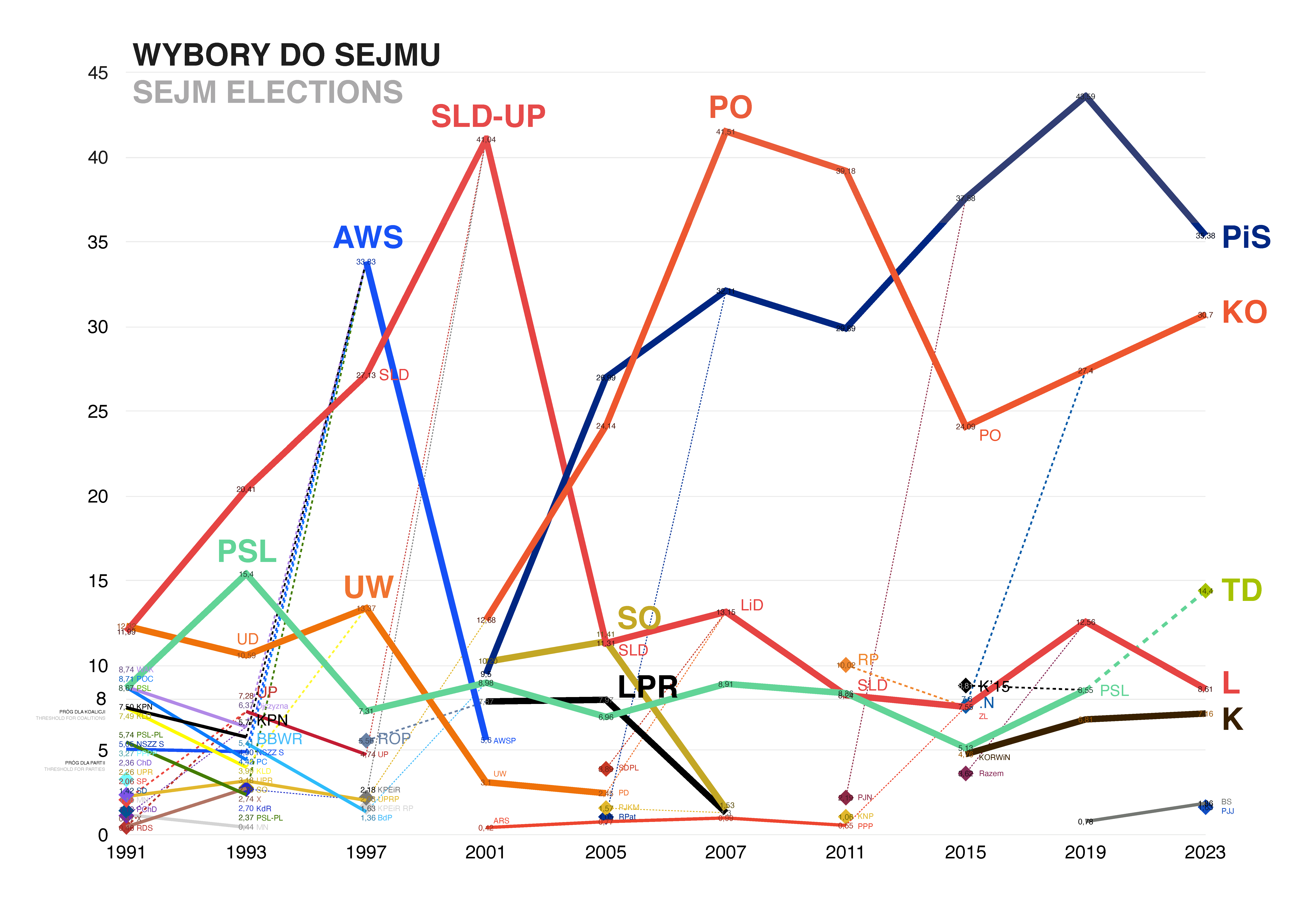
Polish Election Results (historical)

Party or alliance		Votes	%	Seats	+/–
United Right	Law and Justice	6,516,252	35.15	187	−6
United Right	Solidary Poland	331,467	1.79	10	+1
United Right	Agreement	291,506	1.57	16	+10
United Right	Republican Party	9,972	0.05	1	New
United Right	Piast Faction	1,375	0.01	0	0
United Right	Crossed out (Note: Candidate Jan Szyszko died four days before the election.)	3,300	0.02	–	–
United Right	Independents	898,063	4.84	21	–5
United Right	Total	8,051,935	43.44	235	0
Civic Coalition	Civic Platform	3,589,053	19.36	102	−24
Civic Coalition	.Modern	946,095	5.10	8	+3
Civic Coalition	Polish Initiative	113,278	0.61	2	New
Civic Coalition	The Greens	96,720	0.52	3	+3
Civic Coalition	Polish People's Party*	3,887	0.02	0	–
Civic Coalition	Silesian Regional Party	2,452	0.01	0	–
Civic Coalition	Democratic Left Alliance*	1,156	0.01	0	–
Civic Coalition	Social Democracy of Poland	896	0.00	0	–
Civic Coalition	Your Movement	443	0.00	0	–
Civic Coalition	Freedom and Equality	372	0.00	0	–
Civic Coalition	Labour Union	231	0.00	0	–
Civic Coalition	Independents	315,209	1.70	19	−16
Civic Coalition	Total	5,060,355	27.30	134	−32
The Left	Democratic Left Alliance	873,450	4.71	23	+23
The Left	Left Together	509,318	2.75	6	+6
The Left	Spring	483,113	2.61	15	New
The Left	Your Movement	4,910	0.03	0	–
The Left	Polish Socialist Party	2,798	0.02	0	–
The Left	Social Justice Movement	995	0.01	0	–
The Left	Polish Communist Party	819	0.00	0	–
The Left	.Modern*	688	0.00	0	–
The Left	Polish Internet Party	524	0.00	0	–
The Left	Independents	454,065	2.45	5	+5
The Left	Total	2,319,946	12.52	49	+49
Polish Coalition	Polish People's Party	972,339	5.25	19	+3
Polish Coalition	Union of European Democrats	29,832	0.16	1	New
Polish Coalition	Silesians Together	17,836	0.10	0	–
Polish Coalition	Poland Needs Us	4,053	0.02	0	–
Polish Coalition	Alliance of Democrats	2,497	0.01	0	–
Polish Coalition	One-PL	977	0.01	0	–
Polish Coalition	Civic Platform*	294	0.00	0	–
Polish Coalition	League of Polish Families	144	0.00	0	–
Polish Coalition	Independents (Note: Six elected independents are part of Kukiz'15 which was not a registered party at the time of the election and therefore its members ran without party affiliation)	576,352	3.11	10	−27
Polish Coalition	Total	1,578,523	8.52	30	−28
Confederation	National Movement	342,033	1.85	5	+2
Confederation	KORWiN	286,873	1.55	3	+3
Confederation	Confederation (Note: Confederation was registered as a party to circumvent the 8% electoral threshold for electoral coalitions. Two of its elected members are part of KORWiN and one of Confederation of the Polish Crown)	214,731	1.16	3	New
Confederation	Union of Christian Families	15,191	0.08	0	–
Confederation	League of Polish Families	1,731	0.01	0	–
Confederation	Free and Solidary	1,017	0.01	0	–
Confederation	National League	658	0.00	0	–
Confederation	Congress of the New Right	629	0.00	0	–
Confederation	Independents	413,316	2.23	0	0
Confederation	Total	1,256,953	6.78	11	+8
Nonpartisan; Local; Government; Activists	Law and Justice*	504	0.00	0	–
Nonpartisan; Local; Government; Activists	Agreement*	255	0.00	0	–
Nonpartisan; Local; Government; Activists	Polish People's Party*	102	0.00	0	–
Nonpartisan; Local; Government; Activists	Crossed out (Note: Candidate Dariusz Duchniak withdrew permission to be a candidate two days before the election.)	51	0.00	–	–
Nonpartisan; Local; Government; Activists	Independents	143,861	0.78	0	–
Nonpartisan; Local; Government; Activists	Total	144,773	0.78	0	New
German Minority	Regional. Minority with Majority	17,423	0.09	1	–
German Minority	Independents	14,671	0.08	0	–
German Minority	Total	32,094	0.17	1	0
Effective	Effective	8,582	0.05	0	–
Effective	Free and Solidary	1,251	0.01	0	–
Effective	Polish People's Party*	1,150	0.01	0	–
Effective	KORWiN*	249	0.00	0	–
Effective	Unity of the Nation	41	0.00	0	–
Effective	Independents	7,645	0.04	0	–
Effective	Total	18,918	0.10	0	New
Action of Disappointed; Retirees and Pensioners	Action of Disappointed; Retirees and Pensioners	519	0.00	0	–
Action of Disappointed; Retirees and Pensioners	Organization of the Polish; Nation – Polish League	398	0.00	0	–
Action of Disappointed; Retirees and Pensioners	PIAST – Unity of European; Nations' Thought	236	0.00	0	–
Action of Disappointed; Retirees and Pensioners	Self-Defence	217	0.00	0	–
Action of Disappointed; Retirees and Pensioners	Labour Faction	54	0.00	0	–
Action of Disappointed; Retirees and Pensioners	Free and Solidary	52	0.00	0	–
Action of Disappointed; Retirees and Pensioners	Independents	3,972	0.02	0	–
Action of Disappointed; Retirees and Pensioners	Total	5,448	0.03	0	New
Right Wing of the Republic	Congress of the New Right	775	0.00	0	–
Right Wing of the Republic	Right Wing of the Republic	369	0.00	0	–
Right Wing of the Republic	Independents	621	0.00	0	–
Right Wing of the Republic	Total	1,765	0.01	0	−1
Total		18,535,908	100.00	460	0
Valid votes		18,470,710	98.89		
Invalid/blank votes		207,747	1.11		
Total votes		18,678,457	100.00		
Registered voters/turnout		30,253,556	61.74		
Source: National Electoral Commission Spreadsheet data

* – individual members running on lists different from their own parties

== Constituencies ==
Civic Coalition results compared to combined Civic Platform and Modern 2015 results.

Polish Coalition results compared to combined Polish People's Party and Kukiz'15 2015 results.

The Left results compared to combined United Left and Together 2015 results.

Confederation results compared to combined KORWiN and Committee of Grzegorz Braun "God Bless You!" 2015 results.

=== 1st constituency (Legnica) ===
Party	Votes	%	+/–	Seats	+/–
Law and Justice	183,364	42.40	+6.70	6	0
Civic Coalition	108,191	25.02	−7.37	3	−2
The Left	71,061	16.43	+2.34	2	+2
Polish Coalition	31,006	7.17	−6.31	1	0
Confederation	25,319	5.85	+1.53	0	0
Nonpartisan Local Government Activists	13,495	3.12	New	0	New
Total	432,436	100.00	–	12	0

=== 2nd constituency (Wałbrzych) ===
Party	Votes	%	+/–	Seats	+/–
Law and Justice	114,728	40.54	+9.39	4	+1
Civic Coalition	90,812	32.09	−5.70	3	−1
The Left	34,957	12.35	+0.18	1	+1
Polish Coalition	20,528	7.25	−4.74	0	−1
Confederation	15,346	5.42	+1.12	0	0
Nonpartisan Local Government Activists	6,631	2.34	New	0	New
Total	283,002	100.00	–	8	0

=== 3rd constituency (Wrocław) ===
Party	Votes	%	+/–	Seats	+/–
Law and Justice	226,915	34.67	+3.46	5	−1
Civic Coalition	214,629	32.80	−8.34	5	−2
The Left	100,843	15.41	+5.10	2	+2
Confederation	48,775	7.45	+1.99	1	+1
Polish Coalition	42,269	6.46	−4.88	1	0
Nonpartisan Local Government Activists	21,024	3.21	New	0	New
Total	654,455	100.00	–	14	0

=== 4th constituency (Bydgoszcz) ===
Party	Votes	%	+/–	Seats	+/–
Law and Justice	167,550	36.43	+6.23	5	0
Civic Coalition	142,844	31.05	−5.89	4	−1
The Left	69,763	15.17	+1.37	2	+2
Polish Coalition	41,497	9.02	−4.82	1	−1
Confederation	32,406	7.05	+2.51	0	0
Nonpartisan Local Government Activists	5,922	1.29	New	0	New
Total	459,982	100.00	–	12	0

=== 5th constituency (Toruń) ===
Party	Votes	%	+/–	Seats	+/–
Law and Justice	182,648	40.38	+6.81	6	0
Civic Coalition	119,526	26.42	−5.85	4	−1
The Left	67,076	14.83	+0.42	2	+2
Polish Coalition	49,225	10.88	−4.19	1	−1
Confederation	28,625	6.33	+2.43	0	0
Nonpartisan Local Government Activists	5,230	1.16	New	0	New
Total	452,330	100.00	–	13	0

=== 6th constituency (Lublin) ===
Party	Votes	%	+/–	Seats	+/–
Law and Justice	313,284	55.39	+7.82	9	−1
Civic Coalition	109,185	19.30	−1.83	3	0
Polish Coalition	51,474	9.10	−7.96	1	−1
The Left	44,152	7.81	−0.92	1	+1
Confederation	40,012	7.07	+1.79	1	+1
Nonpartisan Local Government Activists	7,490	1.32	New	0	New
Total	565,597	100.00	–	15	0

=== 7th constituency (Chełm) ===
Party	Votes	%	+/–	Seats	+/–
Law and Justice	238,802	59.50	+11.48	8	0
Civic Coalition	59,401	14.80	−1.26	2	0
Polish Coalition	47,604	11.86	−10.00	1	−1
The Left	27,404	6.83	−2.67	1	+1
Confederation	23,439	5.84	+1.47	0	0
Nonpartisan Local Government Activists	4,668	1.16	New	0	New
Total	401,318	100.00	–	12	0

=== 8th constituency (Zielona Góra) ===
Party	Votes	%	+/–	Seats	+/–
Law and Justice	150,188	34.30	+6.03	4	−1
Civic Coalition	136,955	31.27	−6.93	4	−2
The Left	68,341	15.61	+1.60	2	+2
Polish Coalition	50,943	11.63	−2.24	1	0
Confederation	31,490	7.19	+2.20	1	+1
Total	437,917	100.00	–	12	0

=== 9th constituency (Łódź) ===
Party	Votes	%	+/–	Seats	+/–
Civic Coalition	148,830	35.82	−4.47	4	−1
Law and Justice	136,731	32.90	+3.00	4	0
The Left	83,524	20.10	+4.99	2	+2
Confederation	27,627	6.65	+1.87	0	0
Polish Coalition	18,828	4.53	−5.41	0	−1
Total	415,540	100.00	–	10	0

=== 10th constituency (Piotrków Trybunalski) ===
Party	Votes	%	+/–	Seats	+/–
Law and Justice	194,658	56.21	+9.26	6	0
Civic Coalition	54,160	15.64	−5.41	1	−1
The Left	37,930	10.95	+0.42	1	+1
Polish Coalition	36,151	10.44	−7.12	1	0
Confederation	23,427	6.76	+2.85	0	0
Total	346,326	100.00	–	9	0

=== 11th constituency (Sieradz) ===
Party	Votes	%	+/–	Seats	+/–
Law and Justice	229,245	49.81	+9.88	7	0
Civic Coalition	94,268	20.48	−6.02	3	0
The Left	55,116	11.98	+0.26	1	+1
Polish Coalition	47,373	10.29	−6.49	1	−1
Confederation	27,054	5.88	+1.51	0	0
Nonpartisan Local Government Activists	7,183	1.56	New	0	New
Total	460,239	100.00	–	12	0

=== 12th constituency (Kraków I) ===
Party	Votes	%	+/–	Seats	+/–
Law and Justice	169,106	53.48	+4.43	6	+1
Civic Coalition	72,869	23.04	−3.17	2	0
The Left	26,909	8.51	−0.08	0	0
Polish Coalition	24,996	7.90	−3.80	0	−1
Confederation	22,334	7.06	+2.61	0	0
Total	316,214	100.00	–	8	0

=== 13th constituency (Kraków II) ===
Party	Votes	%	+/–	Seats	+/–
Law and Justice	256,847	39.56	+0.94	6	−1
Civic Coalition	197,930	30.48	−3.86	4	−2
The Left	84,457	13.01	+2.75	2	+2
Confederation	51,855	7.99	+1.39	1	+1
Polish Coalition	47,219	7.27	−2.69	1	0
Nonpartisan Local Government Activists	9,214	1.42	New	0	New
Right Wing of the Republic	1,765	0.27	New	0	New
Total	649,287	100.00	–	14	0

=== 14th constituency (Nowy Sącz) ===
Party	Votes	%	+/–	Seats	+/–
Law and Justice	243,583	65.80	+5.24	8	0
Civic Coalition	51,183	13.83	−3.81	1	0
Polish Coalition	27,203	7.35	−4.64	1	0
Confederation	25,747	6.95	+2.64	0	0
The Left	22,483	6.07	+1.39	0	0
Total	370,199	100.00	–	10	0

=== 15th constituency (Tarnów) ===
Party	Votes	%	+/–	Seats	+/–
Law and Justice	206,845	59.59	+7.6	7	+1
Civic Coalition	48,597	14.00	−5.25	1	0
Polish Coalition	46,333	13.35	−4.33	1	−1
Confederation	24,695	7.11	+2.08	0	0
The Left	20,618	5.94	+0.10	0	0
Total	347,088	100.00	–	9	0

=== 16th constituency (Płock) ===
Party	Votes	%	+/–	Seats	+/–
Law and Justice	194,371	52.45	+8.67	6	0
Civic Coalition	62,429	16.85	−4.74	2	0
Polish Coalition	56,227	15.17	−3.90	1	−1
The Left	32,448	8.76	−2.73	1	+1
Confederation	19,405	5.24	+1.17	0	0
Nonpartisan Local Government Activists	5,681	1.53	New	0	New
Total	370,561	100.00	–	10	0

=== 17th constituency (Radom) ===
Party	Votes	%	+/–	Seats	+/–
Law and Justice	193,709	57.82	+10.33	6	+1
Civic Coalition	57,449	17.15	−5.21	2	0
Polish Coalition	34,185	10.20	−7.63	1	−1
The Left	24,884	7.43	−0.01	0	0
Confederation	19,724	5.89	+1.98	0	0
Nonpartisan Local Government Activists	2,555	0.76	New	0	New
Effective	2,503	0.75	New	0	New
Total	335,009	100.00	–	9	0

=== 18th constituency (Siedlce) ===
Party	Votes	%	+/–	Seats	+/–
Law and Justice	270,641	59.76	+8.66	9	+1
Civic Coalition	63,124	13.94	−4.24	2	0
Polish Coalition	54,085	11.94	−6.65	1	−1
Confederation	29,390	6.49	+1.81	0	0
The Left	29,235	6.45	−0.56	0	0
Nonpartisan Local Government Activists	5,019	1.11	New	0	New
Action of Disappointed Retirees and Pensioners	1,412	0.31	New	0	New
Total	452,906	100.00	–	12	0

=== 19th constituency (Warszawa I) ===
Party	Votes	%	+/–	Seats	+/–
Civic Coalition	581,077	42.05	+1.12	9	−1
Law and Justice	379,880	27.49	−2.40	6	−2
The Left	251,434	18.19	+4.10	3	+3
Confederation	103,843	7.51	+1.33	1	+1
Polish Coalition	65,683	4.75	−3.73	1	−1
Total	1,381,917	100.00	–	20	0

==== Voters abroad and on ships ====
Party	Votes	%	+/–
Civic Coalition	122,466	38.95	+11.17
Law and Justice	78,256	24.89	−8.72
The Left	64,981	20.67	+10.63
Confederation	35,802	11.39	−1.15
Polish Coalition	12,929	4.11	−11.66
Total	314,434	100.00	–

=== 20th constituency (Warszawa II) ===
Party	Votes	%	+/–	Seats	+/–
Law and Justice	244,823	40.89	+2.09	6	0
Civic Coalition	171,286	28.61	−6.52	4	−1
The Left	78,348	13.09	+3.58	1	+1
Polish Coalition	51,484	8.60	−2.42	1	0
Confederation	39,675	6.63	+1.82	0	0
Nonpartisan Local Government Activists	13,111	2.19	New	0	New
Total	598,727	100.00	–	12	0

=== 21st constituency (Opole) ===
Party	Votes	%	+/–	Seats	+/–
Law and Justice	152,999	37.64	+9.87	5	+1
Civic Coalition	108,570	26.71	−6.66	4	−1
The Left	47,699	11.74	+1.97	1	+1
Polish Coalition	41,901	10.31	−5.94	1	−1
German Minority	32,094	7.90	−0.24	1	0
Confederation	23,176	5.70	+1.53	0	0
Total	406,439	100.00	–	12	0

=== 22nd constituency (Krosno) ===
Party	Votes	%	+/–	Seats	+/–
Law and Justice	247,488	63.36	+9.85	8	+1
Civic Coalition	62,246	15.94	−1.79	2	0
Polish Coalition	30,655	7.85	−8.58	1	−1
Confederation	26,615	6.81	+2.53	0	0
The Left	23,577	6.04	−0.84	0	0
Total	390,581	100.00	–	11	0

=== 23rd constituency (Rzeszów) ===
Party	Votes	%	+/–	Seats	+/–
Law and Justice	367,268	62.38	+6.27	10	−2
Civic Coalition	84,703	14.39	−2.88	2	0
Confederation	48,600	8.25	+3.02	1	+1
Polish Coalition	45,868	7.79	−6.16	1	0
The Left	38,817	6.59	−0.12	1	+1
Effective	3,530	0.60	New	0	New
Total	588,786	100.00	–	15	0

=== 24th constituency (Białystok) ===
Party	Votes	%	+/–	Seats	+/–
Law and Justice	270,888	52.04	+6.66	8	0
Civic Coalition	109,527	21.04	−1.07	3	−1
Polish Coalition	48,566	9.33	−7.81	1	−1
The Left	47,342	9.09	−0.85	1	+1
Confederation	36,207	6.96	+2.30	1	+1
Nonpartisan Local Government Activists	4,001	0.77	New	0	New
Effective	2,272	0.44	New	0	New
Action of Disappointed Retirees and Pensioners	1,775	0.34	New	0	New
Total	520,578	100.00	–	14	0

=== 25th constituency (Gdańsk) ===
Party	Votes	%	+/–	Seats	+/–
Civic Coalition	218,484	41.31	−2.58	6	0
Law and Justice	169,753	32.10	+2.49	4	−1
The Left	71,236	13.47	+2.90	1	+1
Confederation	38,153	7.21	+2.21	1	+1
Polish Coalition	31,203	5.90	−4.27	0	−1
Total	528,829	100.00	–	12	0

=== 26th constituency (Słupsk) ===
Party	Votes	%	+/–	Seats	+/–
Law and Justice	211,582	36.43	+5.21	5	−1
Civic Coalition	208,208	35.85	−5.83	5	−2
The Left	72,436	12.47	+1.78	2	+2
Polish Coalition	46,132	7.94	−3.31	1	0
Confederation	42,364	7.30	+2.87	1	+1
Total	580,722	100.00	–	14	0

=== 27th constituency (Bielsko-Biała I) ===
Party	Votes	%	+/–	Seats	+/–
Law and Justice	182,027	46.76	+6.34	5	0
Civic Coalition	105,876	27.20	−4.64	3	0
The Left	44,701	11.48	+1.20	1	+1
Confederation	28,900	7.42	+2.74	0	0
Polish Coalition	27,752	7.13	−5.65	0	−1
Total	389,256	100.00	–	9	0

=== 28th constituency (Częstochowa) ===
Party	Votes	%	+/–	Seats	+/–
Law and Justice	125,990	44.28	+8.46	4	0
Civic Coalition	64,374	22.63	−5.06	2	0
The Left	44,354	15.59	+0.83	1	+1
Polish Coalition	24,704	8.68	−7.94	0	−1
Confederation	17,278	6.07	+1.55	0	0
Nonpartisan Local Government Activists	7,817	2.75	New	0	New
Total	284,517	100.00	–	7	0

=== 29th constituency (Katowice I) ===
Party	Votes	%	+/–	Seats	+/–
Law and Justice	128,579	37.75	+7.24	4	0
Civic Coalition	111,078	32.61	−5.28	4	0
The Left	45,583	13.38	+2.02	1	+1
Confederation	26,114	7.67	+2.10	0	0
Polish Coalition	20,408	5.99	−8.70	0	−1
Nonpartisan Local Government Activists	8,885	2.61	New	0	New
Total	340,647	100.00	–	9	0

=== 30th constituency (Bielsko-Biała II) ===
Party	Votes	%	+/–	Seats	+/–
Law and Justice	161,160	48.28	+8.69	5	0
Civic Coalition	92,493	27.71	−2.83	3	0
The Left	32,300	9.68	+0.42	1	+1
Confederation	23,939	7.17	+2.40	0	0
Polish Coalition	18,816	5.64	−7.46	0	−1
Nonpartisan Local Government Activists	5,128	1.54	New	0	New
Total	333,836	100.00	–	9	0

=== 31st constituency (Katowice II) ===
Party	Votes	%	+/–	Seats	+/–
Law and Justice	184,030	39.19	+6.27	5	0
Civic Coalition	174,683	37.20	+0.17	5	−1
The Left	55,992	11.92	+1.07	1	+1
Confederation	34,416	7.33	+1.78	1	+1
Polish Coalition	20,512	4.37	−6.67	0	−1
Total	469,633	100.00	–	12	0

=== 32nd constituency (Katowice III) ===
Party	Votes	%	+/–	Seats	+/–
Law and Justice	124,553	37.13	+7.48	4	0
Civic Coalition	99,499	29.66	−4.87	3	−1
The Left	73,466	21.90	+3.49	2	+2
Confederation	21,650	6.45	+1.64	0	0
Polish Coalition	16,263	4.85	−7.74	0	−1
Total	335,431	100.00	–	9	0

=== 33rd constituency (Kielce) ===
Party	Votes	%	+/–	Seats	+/–
Law and Justice	314,455	55.18	+12.37	10	+1
Civic Coalition	94,880	16.65	−5.58	3	−1
The Left	56,699	9.95	−0.72	1	+1
Polish Coalition	56,289	9.88	−9.04	1	−2
Confederation	33,895	5.95	+1.56	1	+1
Effective	8,273	1.45	New	0	New
Nonpartisan Local Government Activists	5,400	0.95	New	0	New
Total	569,891	100.00	–	16	0

=== 34th constituency (Elbląg) ===
Party	Votes	%	+/–	Seats	+/–
Law and Justice	102,478	40.86	+9.30	4	0
Civic Coalition	71,320	28.43	−7.51	2	−1
The Left	29,196	11.64	+0.15	1	+1
Polish Coalition	27,319	10.89	−4.04	1	0
Confederation	14,187	5.66	+0.93	0	0
Nonpartisan Local Government Activists	6,319	2.52	New	0	New
Total	250,819	100.00	–	8	0

=== 35th constituency (Olsztyn) ===
Party	Votes	%	+/–	Seats	+/–
Law and Justice	128,760	38.82	+8.40	5	+1
Civic Coalition	87,780	26.46	−7.43	3	−1
The Left	45,912	13.84	+1.34	1	+1
Polish Coalition	43,758	13.19	−4.22	1	−1
Confederation	23,134	6.97	+1.87	0	0
Effective	2,340	0.71	New	0	New
Total	331,684	100.00	–	10	0

=== 36th constituency (Kalisz) ===
Party	Votes	%	+/–	Seats	+/–
Law and Justice	195,053	42.48	+10.63	6	+1
Civic Coalition	113,489	24.72	−7.01	3	−2
The Left	61,674	13.43	+1.44	2	+2
Polish Coalition	58,759	12.80	−6.16	1	−1
Confederation	30,177	6.57	+2.32	0	0
Total	459,152	100.00	–	12	0

=== 37th constituency (Konin) ===
Party	Votes	%	+/–	Seats	+/–
Law and Justice	166,965	47.29	+9.88	5	0
Civic Coalition	72,295	20.48	−6.69	2	−1
The Left	53,090	15.04	−0.71	1	+1
Polish Coalition	34,620	9.81	−5.88	1	0
Confederation	23,810	6.74	+2.75	0	0
Action of Disappointed Retirees and Pensioners	2,261	0.64	New	0	New
Total	353,041	100.00	–	9	0

=== 38th constituency (Piła) ===
Party	Votes	%	+/–	Seats	+/–
Law and Justice	124,392	35.64	+8.38	4	+1
Civic Coalition	106,810	30.60	−7.40	3	−1
Polish Coalition	48,371	13.86	−2.81	1	−1
The Left	46,355	13.28	+0.21	1	+1
Confederation	23,123	6.62	+2.55	0	0
Total	349,051	100.00	–	9	0

=== 39th constituency (Poznań) ===
Party	Votes	%	+/–	Seats	+/–
Civic Coalition	233,474	45.38	−4.76	5	−2
Law and Justice	130,319	25.33	+1.43	3	0
The Left	84,835	16.49	+3.82	2	+2
Confederation	34,024	6.61	+1.84	0	0
Polish Coalition	31,875	6.20	−1.77	0	0
Total	514,527	100.00	–	10	0

=== 40th constituency (Koszalin) ===
Party	Votes	%	+/–	Seats	+/–
Law and Justice	100,078	36.83	+8.25	3	0
Civic Coalition	87,799	32.31	−5.82	3	−1
The Left	41,943	15.44	+0.12	1	+1
Polish Coalition	25,632	9.43	−4.11	1	0
Confederation	16,259	5.98	+1.52	0	0
Total	271,711	100.00	–	8	0

=== 41st constituency (Szczecin) ===
Party	Votes	%	+/–	Seats	+/–
Civic Coalition	168,022	35.71	−4.88	5	−1
Law and Justice	165,200	35.11	+6.02	4	−1
The Left	71,756	15.25	+2.57	2	+2
Polish Coalition	34,807	7.40	−4.90	1	0
Confederation	30,744	6.53	+1.20	0	0
Total	470,529	100.00	–	12	0
