= Results breakdown of the 2019 Polish parliamentary election (Senate) =

2019 Polish election results

This is the results breakdown of the Senate election held in Poland on 13 October 2019. The following tables show detailed results in each constituency.

== Nationwide ==
Results of the Senate election by single-mandate districts. Law and Justice (PiS) Civic Coalition (KO) Polish People's Party (PSL) The Left (Lewica) Independent

Cartogram showing the popular vote in each electoral district.

Party or alliance		Votes	%	Seats	+/–
United Right	Law and Justice	5,799,409	31.86	38	−1
United Right	Agreement	356,123	1.96	2	−1
United Right	Solidary Poland	271,915	1.49	2	0
United Right	Independents	1,682,746	9.25	6	−10
United Right	Total	8,110,193	44.56	48	−13
Civic Coalition	Civic Platform	4,481,803	24.62	34	+7
Civic Coalition	Silesian Regional Party	52,117	0.29	0	New
Civic Coalition	Social Democracy of Poland	48,231	0.26	0	New
Civic Coalition	Independents	1,908,155	10.48	9	+3
Civic Coalition	Total	6,490,306	35.66	43	+9
Polish Coalition	Polish People's Party	865,413	4.75	2	+2
Polish Coalition	Union of European Democrats	176,496	0.97	1	New
Polish Coalition	Total	1,041,909	5.72	3	+2
The Left	Democratic Left Alliance	302,312	1.66	0	0
The Left	Spring	64,172	0.35	1	New
The Left	Polish Socialist Party	49,261	0.27	1	+1
The Left	Total	415,745	2.28	2	+2
Bezpartyjni Samorządowcy	Independents	331,385	1.82	0	New
Confederation	National Movement	69,120	0.38	0	0
Confederation	Independents	75,004	0.41	0	0
Confederation	Total	144,124	0.79	0	0
Polish Left	Democratic Left Alliance (Note: Kazimierz Klimek ran as an individual Democratic Left Alliance member on Polish Left list.)	27,158	0.15	0	New
Polish Left	Polish Left	9,884	0.05	0	New
Polish Left	Independents	57,946	0.32	0	New
Polish Left	Total	94,988	0.52	0	New
Restore the Law	Independents	92,006	0.51	0	New
Movement "Citizens RP"	Independents	85,720	0.47	0	0
Silesians Together	Silesians Together	26,264	0.14	0	New
Silesians Together	Independents	23,807	0.13	0	New
Silesians Together	Total	50,071	0.28	0	New
German Minority; Electoral Committee	Regional. Minority with Majority	49,138	0.27	0	0
Kukiz'15 to the Senate	Independents	46,210	0.25	0	0
Mirosław Piotrowski to the Senate	Independents	33,967	0.19	0	New
Together Podhale Spisz Orawa	Independents	26,273	0.14	0	0
Right Wing of the Republic	Independents	21,943	0.12	0	New
Unity of the Nation	PIAST – Unity of European; Nations' Thought	6,794	0.04	0	0
Unity of the Nation	Independents	11,533	0.06	0	New
Unity of the Nation	Total	18,327	0.10	0	New
National Rebirth of Poland	National Rebirth of Poland	13,859	0.08	0	0
Normal Country	Patriotic Poland	13,687	0.08	0	New
Self-Defence	Self-Defence	13,510	0.07	0	0
Labour Party	Independents	11,532	0.06	0	New
Slavic Union	Independents	8,469	0.05	0	0
Independents and other committees with a single candidate	Civic Platform	72,841	0.40	1	New
Independents and other committees with a single candidate	Polish People's Party	72,692	0.40	0	0
Independents and other committees with a single candidate	Law and Justice	20,375	0.11	0	New
Independents and other committees with a single candidate	National Party	5,771	0.03	0	New
Independents and other committees with a single candidate	Independents	916,307	5.03	3	−1
Independents and other committees with a single candidate	Total	1,087,986	5.98	4	0
Total		18,201,348	100.00	100	0
Valid votes		18,201,348	97.45		
Invalid/blank votes		476,582	2.55		
Total votes		18,677,930	100.00		
Registered voters/turnout		30,253,556	61.74		
Source: National Electoral Commission Spreadsheet data

== Constituencies ==
Civic Coalition results compared to combined Civic Platform and Modern 2015 results.

Polish Coalition results compared to combined Polish People's Party and Kukiz'15 2015 results.

The Left results compared to combined United Left and Together 2015 results.

Confederation results compared to combined KORWiN and Committee of Grzegorz Braun "God Bless You!" 2015 results.

=== 1st constituency (Legnica I) ===
Candidate	Party	Votes	%	+/–
Rafał Ślusarz	Law and Justice	45,420	38.53	+1.60
Władysław Kozakiewicz	Civic Coalition	43,529	36.92	+3.82
Piotr Roman	Nonpartisan Local Government Activists	28,938	24.55	New
Total		117,887	100.00	–
Law and Justice hold				

=== 2nd constituency (Legnica II) ===
Candidate	Party	Votes	%	+/–
Krzysztof Mróz	Law and Justice	49,938	39.68	+8.60
Jerzy Pokój (Note: Jerzy Pokój previously ran as an independent receiving 16.45% of the vote)	Civic Coalition	48,770	38.75	+13.32
Kazimierz Klimek (Note: Kazimierz Klimek previously ran under Citizens to Parliament receiving 5.93% of the vote)	Polish Left	27,158	21.58	New
Total		125,866	100.00	–
Law and Justice hold				

=== 3rd constituency (Legnica III) ===
Candidate	Party	Votes	%	+/–
Dorota Czudowska	Law and Justice	86,312	46.67	+3.20
Elżbieta Stępień	Civic Coalition	63,682	34.43	−0.27
Tymoteusz Myrda	Nonpartisan Local Government Activists	34,948	18.90	New
Total		184,942	100.00	–
Law and Justice hold				

=== 4th constituency (Wałbrzych I) ===
Candidate	Party	Votes	%	+/–
Agnieszka Kołacz-Leszczyńska	Civic Coalition	70,209	49.85	+4.10
Kamil Zieliński	Law and Justice	51,722	36.73	+8.78
Mirosław Lubiński	Independent	18,899	13.42	New
Total		140,830	100.00	–
Civic Coalition hold				

=== 5th constituency (Wałbrzych II) ===
Candidate	Party	Votes	%	+/–
Aleksander Szwed	Law and Justice	61,035	43.45	+9.01
Stanisław Jurcewicz	Civic Coalition	57,183	40.71	+7.55
Patryk Hałaczkiewicz	Nonpartisan Local Government Activists	22,260	15.85	New
Total		140,478	100.00	–
Law and Justice hold				

=== 6th constituency (Wrocław I) ===
Candidate	Party	Votes	%	+/–
Bogdan Zdrojewski	Civic Coalition	133,374	45.45	+8.15
Jarosław Obremski	Law and Justice	122,636	41.79	+6.39
Dariusz Stasiak (Note: Dariusz Stasiak previously ran under JOW Independents receiving 15.41% of the vote)	Nonpartisan Local Government Activists	37,461	12.76	New
Total		293,471	100.00	–
Civic Coalition hold				

=== 7th constituency (Wrocław II) ===
Candidate	Party	Votes	%	+/–
Alicja Chybicka	Civic Coalition	113,877	69.21	+24.52
Marcin Krzyżanowski	Law and Justice	50,670	30.79	−0.94
Total		164,547	100.00	–
Civic Coalition hold				

=== 8th constituency (Wrocław III) ===
Candidate	Party	Votes	%	+/–
Barbara Zdrojewska	Civic Coalition	122,071	65.64	+26.19
Sergiusz Kmiecik	Law and Justice	63,891	34.36	New
Total		185,962	100.00	–
Civic Coalition gain from Independent				

=== 9th constituency (Bydgoszcz I) ===
Candidate	Party	Votes	%	+/–
Andrzej Kobiak	Civic Coalition	150,472	52.66	+9.46
Helena Czakowska	Law and Justice	97,813	34.23	+1.08
Leszek Posłuszny	Confederation	37,432	13.10	+2.67
Total		285,717	100.00	–
Civic Coalition hold				

=== 10th constituency (Bydgoszcz II) ===
Candidate	Party	Votes	%	+/–
Krzysztof Brejza	Civic Coalition	79,054	45.76	+9.43
Mikołaj Bogdanowicz	Law and Justice	70,836	41.00	+9.05
Jarosław Latawiec	Confederation	13,377	7.74	−0.68
Mieczysław Piwowar (Note: Mieczysław Piwowar previously ran as an independent receiving 5.22% of the vote)	Nonpartisan Local Government Activists	9,492	5.49	New
Total		172,759	100.00	–
Civic Coalition hold				

=== 11th constituency (Toruń I) ===
Candidate	Party	Votes	%	+/–
Antoni Mężydło	Civic Coalition	98,699	60.90	+13.96
Zbigniew Rasielewski	Law and Justice	63,361	39.10	+13.11
Total		162,060	100.00	–
Civic Coalition hold				

=== 12th constituency (Toruń II) ===
Candidate	Party	Votes	%	+/–
Ryszard Bober	Polish Coalition	52,619	39.26	+16.79
Andrzej Mioduszewski	Law and Justice	50,168	37.43	+2.00
Marek Nowak	Independent	15,013	11.20	New
Zbigniew Adamczyk	Slavic Union	8,469	6.32	−2.64
Robert Zadura	Mirosław Piotrowski to the Senate	7,770	5.80	New
Total		134,039	100.00	–
Polish Coalition gain from Law and Justice				

=== 13th constituency (Toruń III) ===
Candidate	Party	Votes	%	+/–
Józef Łyczak	Law and Justice	60,432	40.16	+6.29
Jerzy Wenderlich	The Left	55,274	36.74	+23.17
Łukasz Zbonikowski	Independent	13,343	8.87	New
Henryk Kierzkowski	Labour Party	11,532	7.66	New
Józef Lewandowski	Polish Left	9,884	6.57	New
Total		150,465	100.00	–
Law and Justice hold				

=== 14th constituency (Lublin I) ===
Candidate	Party	Votes	%	+/–
Stanisław Gogacz	Law and Justice	121,240	62.27	+2.79
Arkadiusz Kasznia	Civic Coalition	48,231	24.77	+1.34
Wojciech Mateńka	Normal Country	13,687	7.03	New
Marcin Walasek	Unity of the Nation	11,533	5.92	New
Total		194,691	100.00	–
Law and Justice hold				

=== 15th constituency (Lublin II) ===
Candidate	Party	Votes	%	+/–
Grzegorz Czelej	Law and Justice	116,605	60.27	+1.04
Krzysztof Kamiński	Civic Coalition	57,354	29.64	New
Paweł Górnik	Independent	19,527	10.09	New
Total		193,486	100.00	–
Law and Justice hold				

=== 16th constituency (Lublin III) ===
Candidate	Party	Votes	%	+/–
Jacek Bury	Civic Coalition	84,889	49.63	New
Krzysztof Michałkiewicz	Law and Justice	72,903	42.63	−1.80
Wojciech Górski	Restore the Law	13,237	7.74	New
Total		171,029	100.00	–
Civic Coalition gain from Law and Justice				

=== 17th constituency (Chełm I) ===
Candidate	Party	Votes	%	+/–
Grzegorz Bierecki (Note: Grzegorz Bierecki previously ran and won the seat as an independent receiving 44.12% of the vote)	Law and Justice	68,666	59.06	New
Sławomir Sosnowski	Polish Coalition	47,596	40.94	+16.13
Total		116,262	100.00	–
Law and Justice gain from Independent				

=== 18th constituency (Chełm II) ===
Candidate	Party	Votes	%	+/–
Józef Zając (Note: Józef Zając previously ran and won the seat under Polish People's Party receiving 49.11% of the vote)	Law and Justice	61,416	60.72	+23.36
Rafał Stachura (Note: Rafał Stachura previously ran as an independent receiving 13.53% of the vote)	Civic Coalition	31,778	31.42	New
Konrad Rękas	Restore the Law	7,958	7.87	New
Total		101,152	100.00	–
Law and Justice gain from Polish Coalition				

=== 19th constituency (Chełm III) ===
Candidate	Party	Votes	%	+/–
Jerzy Chróścikowski	Law and Justice	112,993	63.01	+9.88
Józef Kuropatwa	Polish Coalition	46,951	26.18	+13.34
Marcin Dybowski	Mirosław Piotrowski to the Senate	19,388	10.81	New
Total		179,332	100.00	–
Law and Justice hold				

=== 20th constituency (Zielona Góra I) ===
Candidate	Party	Votes	%	+/–
Robert Dowhan	Civic Coalition	97,398	66.43	+14.38
Zbigniew Kościk	Law and Justice	49,219	33.57	+2.16
Total		146,617	100.00	–
Civic Coalition hold				

=== 21st constituency (Zielona Góra II) ===
Candidate	Party	Votes	%	+/–
Władysław Komarnicki	Civic Coalition	69,298	42.22	+7.66
Marek Surmacz	Law and Justice	48,062	29.28	+2.87
Anna Synowiec	Independent	38,422	23.41	New
Janusz Maksymowicz	Independent	8,354	5.09	New
Total		164,136	100.00	–
Civic Coalition hold				

=== 22nd constituency (Zielona Góra III) ===
Candidate	Party	Votes	%	+/–
Wadim Tyszkiewicz	Independent	63,675	51.90	New
Klaudiusz Balcerzak	Law and Justice	38,646	31.50	−2.34
Robert Paluch (Note: Robert Paluch previously ran under Law and Justice receiving 33.84% of the vote)	Independent	20,375	16.61	New
Total		122,696	100.00	–
Independent gain from Civic Coalition				

=== 23rd constituency (Łódź I) ===
Candidate	Party	Votes	%	+/–
Artur Dunin	Civic Coalition	134,414	67.17	+7.71
Dominik Sankowski	Law and Justice	65,710	32.83	+3.08
Total		200,124	100.00	–
Civic Coalition hold				

=== 24th constituency (Łódź II) ===
Candidate	Party	Votes	%	+/–
Krzysztof Kwiatkowski	Independent	79,348	38.09	New
Marek Markiewicz	Law and Justice	73,900	35.48	+3.04
Małgorzata Niewiadomska-Cudak	The Left	55,046	26.43	New
Total		208,294	100.00	–
Independent gain from Civic Coalition				

=== 25th constituency (Sieradz I) ===
Candidate	Party	Votes	%	+/–
Przemysław Błaszczyk	Law and Justice	69,998	57.69	+12.76
Krzysztof Debich	Civic Coalition	39,382	32.45	+7.52
Dariusz Pigłowski (Note: Dariusz Pigłowski previously ran under Kukiz'15 receiving 16.54% of the vote)	Restore the Law	11,965	9.86	New
Total		121,345	100.00	–
Law and Justice hold				

=== 26th constituency (Sieradz II) ===
Candidate	Party	Votes	%	+/–
Maciej Łuczak	Law and Justice	70,561	41.82	−1.16
Krzysztof Habura	Civic Coalition	68,670	40.69	+0.37
Jakub Filipowicz	Nonpartisan Local Government Activists	29,513	17.49	New
Total		168,744	100.00	–
Law and Justice hold				

=== 27th constituency (Sieradz III) ===
Candidate	Party	Votes	%	+/–
Michał Seweryński	Law and Justice	86,706	52.20	+6.57
Jacek Walczak	Civic Coalition	52,341	31.51	+2.15
Radosław Sałata	Confederation	18,602	11.20	New
Andrzej Urbaniak	Self-Defence of the Republic of Poland	8,462	5.09	−1.50
Total		166,111	100.00	–
Law and Justice hold				

=== 28th constituency (Piotrków Trybunalski I) ===
Candidate	Party	Votes	%	+/–
Wiesław Dobkowski	Law and Justice	102,812	55.63	+9.34
Arkadiusz Ciach	The Left	44,408	24.03	+11.97
Stanisław Witaszczyk	Polish Coalition	37,607	20.35	+7.37
Total		184,827	100.00	–
Law and Justice hold				

=== 29th constituency (Piotrków Trybunalski II) ===
Candidate	Party	Votes	%	+/–
Rafał Ambrozik	Law and Justice	83,024	53.32	+11.14
Artur Bagieński	Independent	72,692	46.68	New
Total		155,716	100.00	–
Law and Justice hold				

=== 30th constituency (Kraków I) ===
Candidate	Party	Votes	%	+/–
Andrzej Pająk	Law and Justice	179,338	57.90	+5.24
Maciej Koźbiał	Civic Coalition	130,397	42.10	+9.79
Total		309,735	100.00	–
Law and Justice hold				

=== 31st constituency (Kraków II) ===
Candidate	Party	Votes	%	+/–
Marek Pęk	Law and Justice	122,468	57.35	+7.45
Janusz Bargieł	The Left	91,089	42.65	New
Total		213,557	100.00	–
Law and Justice hold				

=== 32nd constituency (Kraków III) ===
Candidate	Party	Votes	%	+/–
Jerzy Fedorowicz	Civic Coalition	117,177	59.55	+17.04
Jan Duda	Law and Justice	79,608	40.45	+0.84
Total		196,785	100.00	–
Civic Coalition hold				

=== 33rd constituency (Kraków IV) ===
Candidate	Party	Votes	%	+/–
Bogdan Klich	Civic Coalition	123,080	54.66	+16.62
Krzysztof Mazur	Law and Justice	74,177	32.94	−0.96
Rafał Komarewicz	Independent	27,904	12.39	New
Total		225,161	100.00	–
Civic Coalition hold				

=== 34th constituency (Tarnów I) ===
Candidate	Party	Votes	%	+/–
Włodzimierz Bernacki	Law and Justice	97,648	55.61	+1.28
Artur Kozioł	Civic Coalition	39,255	22.36	New
Wojciech Kozak	Polish Coalition	26,570	15.13	−14.41
Mirosław Chodur	Independent	12,110	6.90	New
Total		175,583	100.00	–
Law and Justice hold				

=== 35th constituency (Tarnów II) ===
Candidate	Party	Votes	%	+/–
Kazimierz Wiatr	Law and Justice	98,317	58.32	−5.79
Zbigniew Karciński	Polish Coalition	49,121	29.14	−6.75
Dariusz Klich	Confederation	21,147	12.54	New
Total		168,585	100.00	–
Law and Justice hold				

=== 36th constituency (Nowy Sącz I) ===
Candidate	Party	Votes	%	+/–
Jan Hamerski	Law and Justice	113,454	65.35	+4.97
Bronisław Dutka	Polish Coalition	33,879	19.51	New
Bogusław Waksmundzki	Together Podhale Spisz Orawa	26,273	15.13	−0.42
Total		173,606	100.00	–
Law and Justice hold				

=== 37th constituency (Nowy Sącz II) ===
Candidate	Party	Votes	%	+/–
Wiktor Durlak	Law and Justice	107,119	60.33	−6.37
Stanisław Kogut (Note: Stanisław Kogut previously ran and won the seat under Law and Justice receiving 66.70% of the vote)	Independent	70,424	39.67	New
Total		177,543	100.00	–
Law and Justice hold				

=== 38th constituency (Płock I) ===
Candidate	Party	Votes	%	+/–
Marek Martynowski	Law and Justice	115,800	52.41	+9.13
Waldemar Pawlak	Polish Coalition	105,141	47.59	+13.40
Total		220,941	100.00	–
Law and Justice hold				

=== 39th constituency (Płock II) ===
Candidate	Party	Votes	%	+/–
Jan Maria Jackowski	Law and Justice	83,808	58.02	+8.35
Andrzej Kamasa	Civic Coalition	42,653	29.53	+7.90
Piotr Mierzwa	Nonpartisan Local Government Activists	17,997	12.46	New
Total		144,458	100.00	–
Law and Justice hold				

=== 40th constituency (Warszawa I) ===
Candidate	Party	Votes	%	+/–
Jolanta Hibner	Civic Coalition	146,318	51.52	+4.30
Jan Żaryn	Law and Justice	137,674	48.48	−4.30
Total		283,992	100.00	–
Civic Coalition gain from Law and Justice				

=== 41st constituency (Warszawa II) ===
Candidate	Party	Votes	%	+/–
Michał Kamiński	Polish Coalition	176,496	58.56	New
Konstanty Radziwiłł	Law and Justice	124,885	41.44	+1.94
Total		301,381	100.00	–
Polish Coalition gain from Law and Justice				

=== 42nd constituency (Warszawa III) ===
Candidate	Party	Votes	%	+/–
Marek Borowski (Note: Marek Borowski previously ran and won the seat as an independent receiving 60.69% of the vote)	Civic Coalition	153,994	64.55	New
Cezary Jurkiewicz	Law and Justice	84,557	35.45	−4.46
Total		238,551	100.00	–
Civic Coalition gain from Independent				

=== 43rd constituency (Warszawa IV) ===
Candidate	Party	Votes	%	+/–
Barbara Borys-Damięcka	Civic Coalition	157,359	53.08	+10.52
Lech Jaworski	Law and Justice	81,168	27.38	−4.66
Monika Jaruzelska	Polish Left	57,946	19.55	New
Total		296,473	100.00	–
Civic Coalition hold				

=== 44th constituency (Warszawa V) ===
Candidate	Party	Votes	%	+/–
Kazimierz Ujazdowski	Civic Coalition	308,627	55.25	+11.84
Marek Rudnicki	Law and Justice	164,242	29.40	−11.36
Cezary Kasprzak	Movement "Citizens RP"	85,720	15.35	New
Total		558,589	100.00	–
Civic Coalition hold				

==== Voters abroad and on ships ====
Candidate	Party	Votes	%	+/–
Kazimierz Ujazdowski	Civic Coalition	173,535	56.13	+21.78
Marek Rudnicki	Law and Justice	88,958	28.77	−17.45
Cezary Kasprzak	Movement "Citizens RP"	46,683	15.10	New
Total		309,176	100.00	–
Source: Abroad On ships

=== 45th constituency (Warszawa VI) ===
Candidate	Party	Votes	%	+/–
Aleksander Pociej	Civic Coalition	175,660	67.06	+21.97
Piotr Radziszewski	Law and Justice	86,289	32.94	−3.20
Total		261,949	100.00	–
Civic Coalition hold				

=== 46th constituency (Siedlce I) ===
Candidate	Party	Votes	%	+/–
Robert Mamątow	Law and Justice	104,694	61.53	+6.95
Tadeusz Nalewajk	Polish Coalition	65,445	38.47	+12.82
Total		170,139	100.00	–
Law and Justice hold				

=== 47th constituency (Siedlce II) ===
Candidate	Party	Votes	%	+/–
Maria Koc	Law and Justice	99,549	62.00	+8.81
Mirosław Krusiewicz	Civic Coalition	47,414	29.53	+12.71
Leszek Szymański	Mirosław Piotrowski to the Senate	6,809	4.24	New
Krzysztof Prokopczyk	Unity of the Nation	6,794	4.23	New
Total		160,566	100.00	–
Law and Justice hold				

=== 48th constituency (Siedlce III) ===
Candidate	Party	Votes	%	+/–
Waldemar Kraska	Law and Justice	72,101	61.49	+5.15
Janina Orzełowska	Polish Coalition	45,148	38.51	+9.96
Total		117,249	100.00	–
Law and Justice hold				

=== 49th constituency (Radom I) ===
Candidate	Party	Votes	%	+/–
Stanisław Karczewski	Law and Justice	70,878	63.10	+1.49
Leszek Przybytniak	Polish Coalition	41,441	36.90	−1.49
Total		112,319	100.00	–
Law and Justice hold				

=== 50th constituency (Radom II) ===
Candidate	Party	Votes	%	+/–
Wojciech Skurkiewicz	Law and Justice	126,296	57.45	+13.93
Marta Michalska-Wilk	Civic Coalition	69,353	31.55	+6.68
Elżbieta Komosa	Confederation	24,195	11.01	New
Total		219,844	100.00	–
Law and Justice hold				

=== 51st constituency (Opole I) ===
Candidate	Party	Votes	%	+/–
Jerzy Czerwiński	Law and Justice	73,426	45.54	+14.86
Jan Woźniak	The Left	56,495	35.04	New
Janusz Sanocki	Restore the Law	18,027	11.18	New
Adam Mazguła	Independent	13,297	8.25	New
Total		161,245	100.00	–
Law and Justice hold				

=== 52nd constituency (Opole II) ===
Candidate	Party	Votes	%	+/–
Danuta Jazłowiecka	Civic Coalition	60,597	54.54	+11.09
Marek Kawa	Law and Justice	31,598	28.44	+1.84
Rafał Bartek	German Minority	18,917	17.03	+2.15
Total		111,112	100.00	–
Civic Coalition hold				

=== 53rd constituency (Opole III) ===
Candidate	Party	Votes	%	+/–
Beniamin Godyla	Civic Coalition	53,012	40.63	+9.38
Bogdan Tomaszek	Law and Justice	47,230	36.20	+13.13
Roman Kolek	German Minority	30,221	23.16	+3.95
Total		130,463	100.00	–
Civic Coalition gain from Law and Justice				

=== 54th constituency (Rzeszów I) ===
Candidate	Party	Votes	%	+/–
Janina Sagatowska	Law and Justice	94,603	63.15	+9.19
Lidia Błądek (Note: Lidia Błądek previously ran as an independent receiving 22.39% of the vote)	Civic Coalition	40,556	27.07	New
Marzena Kardasińska (Note: Marzena Kardasińska previously ran under Kukiz'15 receiving 23.65% of the vote)	Restore the Law	14,650	9.78	New
Total		149,809	100.00	–
Law and Justice hold				

=== 55th constituency (Rzeszów II) ===
Candidate	Party	Votes	%	+/–
Zdzisław Pupa	Law and Justice	155,404	73.12	+8.89
Tadeusz Urban	Civic Coalition	57,127	26.88	+5.72
Total		212,531	100.00	–
Law and Justice hold				

=== 56th constituency (Rzeszów III) ===
Candidate	Party	Votes	%	+/–
Stanisław Ożóg	Law and Justice	123,900	56.85	+14.11
Maciej Masłowski	Independent	94,028	43.15	New
Total		217,928	100.00	–
Law and Justice hold				

=== 57th constituency (Krosno I) ===
Candidate	Party	Votes	%	+/–
Alicja Zając	Law and Justice	100,300	65.49	+6.78
Daria Balon	Civic Coalition	36,233	23.66	+9.13
Ryszard Skotniczny	Independent	16,612	10.85	New
Total		153,145	100.00	–
Law and Justice hold				

=== 58th constituency (Krosno II) ===
Candidate	Party	Votes	%	+/–
Mieczysław Golba	Law and Justice	150,594	64.75	+7.56
Bartosz Romowicz	Polish Coalition	81,983	35.25	+10.51
Total		232,577	100.00	–
Law and Justice hold				

=== 59th constituency (Białystok I) ===
Compared to 2016 by-election.

Candidate	Party	Votes	%	+/–
Marek Komorowski	Law and Justice	111,737	58.17	+10.91
Zenon Białobrzeski	Polish Coalition	58,887	30.66	−10.37
Janusz Wasilewski	Kukiz'15	21,465	11.17	New
Total		192,089	100.00	–
Law and Justice hold				

=== 60th constituency (Białystok II) ===
Candidate	Party	Votes	%	+/–
Mariusz Gromko	Law and Justice	104,694	43.90	−1.99
Zbigniew Nikitorowicz	Civic Coalition	86,582	36.31	+0.86
Wanda Jankowska	Kukiz'15	24,745	10.38	New
Jan Dobrzyński (Note: Jan Dobrzyński previously ran and won the seat under Law and Justice receiving 45.89% of the vote)	Independent	22,435	9.41	New
Total		238,456	100.00	–
Law and Justice hold				

=== 61st constituency (Białystok III) ===
Candidate	Party	Votes	%	+/–
Jacek Bogucki	Law and Justice	48,257	56.53	+1.90
Igor Łukaszuk	Civic Coalition	32,059	37.56	New
Aldona Skirgiełło	Self-Defence of the Republic of Poland	5,048	5.91	New
Total		85,364	100.00	–
Law and Justice hold				

=== 62nd constituency (Słupsk I) ===
Candidate	Party	Votes	%	+/–
Kazimierz Kleina	Civic Coalition	123,191	60.02	+1.90
Dorota Arciszewska-Mielewczyk	Law and Justice	82,076	39.98	−1.90
Total		205,267	100.00	–
Civic Coalition hold				

=== 63rd constituency (Słupsk II) ===
Candidate	Party	Votes	%	+/–
Stanisław Lamczyk	Civic Coalition	90,404	46.81	+8.74
Dariusz Drelich	Law and Justice	79,556	41.19	+0.94
Waldemar Bonkowski (Note: Waldemar Bonkowski previously ran and won the seat under Law and Justice receiving 40.25% of the vote)	Independent	23,181	12.00	New
Total		193,141	100.00	–
Civic Coalition gain from Law and Justice				

=== 64th constituency (Słupsk III) ===
Candidate	Party	Votes	%	+/–
Sławomir Rybicki	Civic Coalition	106,970	60.95	+7.42
Marcin Bełbot	Law and Justice	50,293	28.66	−5.05
Józef Franciszek Wójcik	Independent	18,233	10.39	−2.38
Total		175,496	100.00	–
Civic Coalition hold				

=== 65th constituency (Gdańsk I) ===
Candidate	Party	Votes	%	+/–
Bogdan Borusewicz	Civic Coalition	195,056	70.45	+17.42
Anna Gwiazda	Law and Justice	81,811	29.55	−3.62
Total		276,867	100.00	–
Civic Coalition hold				

=== 66th constituency (Gdańsk II) ===
Candidate	Party	Votes	%	+/–
Ryszard Świlski	Civic Coalition	87,639	57.30	+21.44
Antoni Szymański	Law and Justice	65,318	42.70	+6.49
Total		152,957	100.00	–
Civic Coalition gain from Law and Justice				

=== 67th constituency (Gdańsk III) ===
Candidate	Party	Votes	%	+/–
Leszek Czarnobaj	Civic Coalition	53,771	60.92	+20.88
Kazimierz Janiak	Law and Justice	34,488	39.08	+7.46
Total		88,259	100.00	–
Civic Coalition hold				

=== 68th constituency (Częstochowa I) ===
Candidate	Party	Votes	%	+/–
Ryszard Majer	Law and Justice	82,080	48.26	+10.27
Łukasz Banaś	Civic Coalition	55,739	32.77	–5.03
Tomasz Kajkowski	Nonpartisan Local Government Activists	22,658	13.32	New
Krzysztof Kubat	Restore the Law	9,619	5.66	New
Total		170,096	100.00	–
Law and Justice hold				

=== 69th constituency (Częstochowa II) ===
Candidate	Party	Votes	%	+/–
Wojciech Konieczny	The Left	49,261	43.75	+30.26
Artur Warzocha	Law and Justice	43,893	38.99	+3.81
Krzysztof Świerczyński	Nonpartisan Local Government Activists	19,433	17.26	New
Total		112,587	100.00	–
The Left gain from Law and Justice				

=== 70th constituency (Katowice I) ===
Candidate	Party	Votes	%	+/–
Zygmunt Frankiewicz	Civic Coalition	124,255	61.09	+9.37
Krystian Probierz	Law and Justice	79,131	38.91	+3.64
Total		203,386	100.00	–
Civic Coalition gain from Law and Justice				

=== 71st constituency (Katowice II) ===
Candidate	Party	Votes	%	+/–
Halina Bieda	Civic Coalition	74,605	57.19	+23.19
Andrzej Misiołek	Law and Justice	55,840	42.81	+11.54
Total		130,445	100.00	–
Civic Coalition hold				

=== 72nd constituency (Bielsko-Biała I) ===
Candidate	Party	Votes	%	+/–
Ewa Gawęda	Law and Justice	97,412	54.05	+10.69
Marek Migalski	Civic Coalition	82,830	45.95	+19.80
Total		180,242	100.00	–
Law and Justice hold				

=== 73rd constituency (Bielsko-Biała II) ===
Candidate	Party	Votes	%	+/–
Wojciech Piecha	Law and Justice	68,619	46.18	+1.42
Grzegorz Wolnik	Civic Coalition	56,179	37.80	+3.22
Paweł Helis (Note: Paweł Helis previously ran under KORWiN receiving 13.56% of the vote)	Silesians Together	23,807	16.02	New
Total		148,605	100.00	–
Law and Justice hold				

=== 74th constituency (Katowice III) ===
Candidate	Party	Votes	%	+/–
Dorota Tobiszowska	Law and Justice	71,752	38.35	+5.76
Henryk Mercik	Civic Coalition	52,117	27.86	−6.25
Dawid Kostempski	Independent	36,952	19.75	New
Leon Swaczyna	Silesians Together	26,264	14.04	−12.18
Total		187,085	100.00	–
Law and Justice gain from Civic Coalition				

=== 75th constituency (Katowice IV) ===
Candidate	Party	Votes	%	+/–
Gabriela Morawska-Stanecka	The Left	64,172	50.93	New
Czesław Ryszka	Law and Justice	61,823	49.07	−1.41
Total		125,995	100.00	–
The Left gain from Law and Justice				

=== 76th constituency (Katowice V) ===
Candidate	Party	Votes	%	+/–
Beata Małecka-Libera	Civic Coalition	82,090	43.14	+8.26
Arkadiusz Grabowski	Law and Justice	72,823	38.27	+1.87
Marcin Lazar	Nonpartisan Local Government Activists	23,479	12.34	New
Katarzyna Zagajska	Independent	11,916	6.26	New
Total		190,308	100.00	–
Civic Coalition gain from Law and Justice				

=== 77th constituency (Katowice VI) ===
Candidate	Party	Votes	%	+/–
Joanna Sekuła	Civic Coalition	83,771	59.60	+14.79
Jacek Dudek	Law and Justice	56,789	40.40	+10.95
Total		140,560	100.00	–
Civic Coalition gain from Law and Justice				

=== 78th constituency (Bielsko-Biała III) ===
Candidate	Party	Votes	%	+/–
Agnieszka Gorgoń-Komor	Civic Coalition	114,113	51.09	+10.67
Andrzej Kamiński	Law and Justice	109,241	48.91	+1.27
Total		223,354	100.00	–
Civic Coalition gain from Law and Justice				

=== 79th constituency (Bielsko-Biała IV) ===
Candidate	Party	Votes	%	+/–
Tadeusz Kopeć	Law and Justice	78,655	49.16	+5.93
Hubert Maślanka	Civic Coalition	64,787	40.49	+8.13
Jerzy Jachnik	Restore the Law	16,550	10.34	New
Total		159,992	100.00	–
Law and Justice hold				

=== 80th constituency (Katowice VII) ===
Candidate	Party	Votes	%	+/–
Marek Plura	Civic Coalition	92,332	62.15	+11.63
Bronisław Korfanty	Law and Justice	56,228	37.85	+8.44
Total		148,560	100.00	–
Civic Coalition hold				

=== 81st constituency (Kielce I) ===
Candidate	Party	Votes	%	+/–
Jacek Włosowicz	Law and Justice	121,321	64.09	+18.35
Andrzej Lasak	Polish Coalition	67,983	35.91	+20.82
Total		189,304	100.00	–
Law and Justice hold				

=== 82nd constituency (Kielce II) ===
Candidate	Party	Votes	%	+/–
Jarosław Rusiecki	Law and Justice	87,428	49.30	+12.44
Marzena Dębniak	Independent	55,729	31.43	New
Dariusz Loranty	Nonpartisan Local Government Activists	34,175	19.27	New
Total		177,332	100.00	–
Law and Justice hold				

=== 83rd constituency (Kielce III) ===
Candidate	Party	Votes	%	+/–
Krzysztof Słoń	Law and Justice	97,471	49.33	+3.27
Edward Rzepka	Civic Coalition	51,354	25.99	New
Przemysław Gierada	Independent	19,883	10.06	New
Marcin Bugajski	Independent	14,457	7.32	New
Kazimierz Kik	Nonpartisan Local Government Activists	14,409	7.29	New
Total		197,574	100.00	–
Law and Justice hold				

=== 84th constituency (Elbląg I) ===
Candidate	Party	Votes	%	+/–
Jerzy Wcisła	Civic Coalition	57,022	44.62	+3.25
Sławomir Sadowski	Law and Justice	51,049	39.95	+3.72
Artur Piegdoń	Nonpartisan Local Government Activists	19,710	15.42	New
Total		127,781	100.00	–
Civic Coalition hold				

=== 85th constituency (Elbląg II) ===
Candidate	Party	Votes	%	+/–
Bogusława Orzechowska	Law and Justice	51,378	41.98	+6.30
Stanisław Gorczyca	Civic Coalition	43,947	35.90	+2.84
Janusz Bielecki	Nonpartisan Local Government Activists	16,912	13.82	New
Łukasz Tulwiński	Confederation	10,162	8.30	New
Total		122,399	100.00	–
Law and Justice hold				

=== 86th constituency (Olsztyn I) ===
Candidate	Party	Votes	%	+/–
Lidia Staroń	Independent	106,035	59.46	+15.67
Jarosław Słoma	Civic Coalition	44,589	25.00	−8.32
Andrzej Maciejewski	Right Wing of the Republic	21,943	12.30	New
Leszek Bubel	Independent	5,771	3.24	New
Total		178,338	100.00	–
Independent hold				

=== 87th constituency (Olsztyn II) ===
Candidate	Party	Votes	%	+/–
Małgorzata Kopiczko	Law and Justice	63,910	42.05	+5.61
Jolanta Piotrowska	Civic Coalition	59,595	39.21	+3.47
Stanisław Tołwiński	Independent	28,465	18.73	−9.09
Total		151,970	100.00	–
Law and Justice hold				

=== 88th constituency (Piła I) ===
Candidate	Party	Votes	%	+/–
Adam Szejnfeld	Civic Coalition	77,873	43.64	+11.20
Jolanta Turczynowicz-Kieryłło	Law and Justice	69,292	38.83	+10.08
Jan Augustyn	Independent	31,285	17.53	+10.93
Total		178,450	100.00	–
Civic Coalition hold				

=== 89th constituency (Piła II) ===
Candidate	Party	Votes	%	+/–
Jan Filip Libicki (Note: Jan Filip Libicki previously ran and won the seat under Civic Platform receiving 42.30% of the vote)	Polish Coalition	105,042	63.04	New
Jerzy Wierzchowiecki	Law and Justice	61,598	36.96	+5.50
Total		166,640	100.00	–
Polish Coalition gain from Civic Coalition				

=== 90th constituency (Poznań I) ===
Candidate	Party	Votes	%	+/–
Jadwiga Rotnicka	Civic Coalition	142,987	69.41	−3.15
Jarosław Pucek	Law and Justice	63,031	30.59	+3.15
Total		206,018	100.00	–
Civic Coalition hold				

=== 91st constituency (Poznań II) ===
Candidate	Party	Votes	%	+/–
Marcin Bosacki	Civic Coalition	213,492	72.02	+4.85
Przemysław Alexandrowicz	Law and Justice	82,940	27.98	−4.85
Total		296,432	100.00	–
Civic Coalition hold				

=== 92nd constituency (Konin I) ===
Candidate	Party	Votes	%	+/–
Paweł Arndt	Civic Coalition	76,897	41.71	−6.63
Robert Gaweł	Law and Justice	75,413	40.90	+4.65
Michał Jurga	Confederation	19,209	10.42	New
Mirosław Piasecki	Independent	12,847	6.97	New
Total		184,366	100.00	–
Civic Coalition gain from Law and Justice				

=== 93rd constituency (Konin II) ===
Candidate	Party	Votes	%	+/–
Margareta Budner	Law and Justice	98,117	59.34	+19.36
Maciej Sytek	Civic Coalition	67,219	40.66	+7.46
Total		165,336	100.00	–
Law and Justice hold				

=== 94th constituency (Kalisz I) ===
Candidate	Party	Votes	%	+/–
Wojciech Ziemniak	Civic Coalition	77,057	51.35	+22.59
Adam Kośmider	Law and Justice	59,144	39.41	+10.89
Mariusz Trawka	National Rebirth of Poland	13,859	9.24	+4.44
Total		150,060	100.00	–
Civic Coalition hold				

=== 95th constituency (Kalisz II) ===
Candidate	Party	Votes	%	+/–
Ewa Matecka	Civic Coalition	80,084	50.73	+16.59
Łukasz Mikołajczyk	Law and Justice	77,780	49.27	+12.59
Total		157,864	100.00	–
Civic Coalition gain from Law and Justice				

=== 96th constituency (Kalisz III) ===
Candidate	Party	Votes	%	+/–
Janusz Pęcherz	Civic Coalition	72,579	50.55	+12.77
Andrzej Wojtyła	Law and Justice	70,993	49.45	+12.61
Total		143,572	100.00	–
Civic Coalition gain from Law and Justice				

=== 97th constituency (Szczecin I) ===
Candidate	Party	Votes	%	+/–
Tomasz Grodzki	Civic Coalition	149,245	65.57	+12.66
Małgorzata Jacyna-Witt	Law and Justice	78,378	34.43	+2.64
Total		227,623	100.00	–
Civic Coalition hold				

=== 98th constituency (Szczecin II) ===
Candidate	Party	Votes	%	+/–
Magdalena Kochan	Civic Coalition	135,041	58.29	+15.50
Edward Kosmal	Law and Justice	96,628	41.71	+11.77
Total		231,669	100.00	–
Civic Coalition hold				

=== 99th constituency (Koszalin I) ===
Candidate	Party	Votes	%	+/–
Janusz Gromek	Civic Coalition	59,348	43.45	+7.31
Henryk Carewicz	Law and Justice	49,350	36.13	+6.22
Grażyna Sztark (Note: Grażyna Sztark previously ran and won the seat under Civic Platform receiving 36.14% of the vote)	Independent	27,885	20.42	New
Total		136,583	100.00	–
Civic Coalition hold				

=== 100th constituency (Koszalin II) ===
Candidate	Party	Votes	%	+/–
Stanisław Gawłowski	Independent	44,956	33.67	New
Krzysztof Nieckarz	Law and Justice	44,636	33.43	+4.77
Krzysztof Berezowski	Independent	43,933	32.90	New
Total		133,525	100.00	–
Independent gain from Civic Coalition				
