= Results breakdown of the 2019 European Parliament election in Poland =

Breakdown of election results

This is the results breakdown of the election held in Poland as part of the 2019 European Parliament election on 26 May 2019. The following tables show detailed results by each party in electoral coalitions, as well as constituency results.

== Nationwide ==
Results by parliamentary grouping

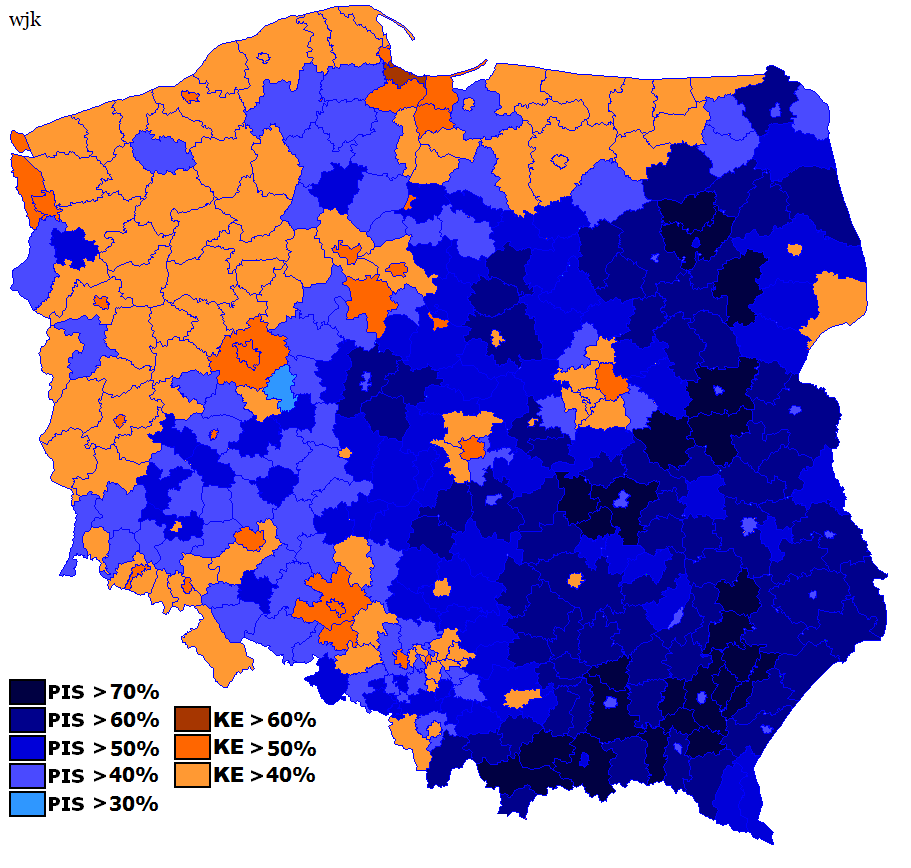
Result by Powiat

Party or alliance		Votes	%	Seats	+/–
United Right	Law and Justice	4,775,790	34.99	21	+6
United Right	Solidary Poland	289,536	2.12	1	+1
United Right	Agreement	287,671	2.11	1	+1
United Right	Independents	839,783	6.15	4	+1
United Right	Total	6,192,780	45.38	27	+8
European Coalition	Civic Platform (Note: Includes 199,591 votes and 1 seat for a supported independent.)	2,904,440	21.28	12	−7
European Coalition	Democratic Left Alliance (Note: Includes 423,559 votes and 2 seats for supported independents.)	812,584	5.95	5	+1
European Coalition	Polish People's Party (Note: Includes 35,075 votes and 0 seats for a supported independent.)	617,772	4.53	3	−1
European Coalition	The Greens (Note: Includes 2,384 votes and 0 seats for a supported independent.)	55,756	0.41	0	0
European Coalition	Modern	52,951	0.39	0	New
European Coalition	Union of European Democrats	6,540	0.05	0	New
European Coalition	Feminist Initiative	2,257	0.02	0	0
European Coalition	Social Democracy of Poland	1,346	0.01	0	New
European Coalition	Independents	796,289	5.83	2	New
European Coalition	Total	5,249,935	38.47	22	−6
Spring	Spring	493,433	3.62	3	New
Spring	Liberal-Socials	29,570	0.22	0	New
Spring	Edward Gierek's Economic; Revival Movement	926	0.01	0	New
Spring	Independents	303,046	2.22	0	New
Spring	Total	826,975	6.06	3	New
Confederation	National Movement	142,076	1.04	0	0
Confederation	Party of Drivers	11,895	0.09	0	New
Confederation	Independents (Note: Members of KORWiN and Effective ran as independents.)	467,217	3.42	0	0
Confederation	Total	621,188	4.55	0	0
Kukiz'15	Right Wing of the Republic	46,472	0.34	0	−1
Kukiz'15	Real Politics Union	7,628	0.06	0	0
Kukiz'15	Silesians Together	5,454	0.04	0	New
Kukiz'15	Direct Democracy	2,540	0.02	0	0
Kukiz'15	Independents	441,470	3.23	0	New
Kukiz'15	Total	503,564	3.69	0	New
Left Together	Together	128,075	0.94	0	New
Left Together	Social Justice Movement	21,145	0.15	0	New
Left Together	Labour Union	16,303	0.12	0	−1
Left Together	Independents	3,222	0.02	0	New
Left Together	Total	168,745	1.24	0	New
Poland Fair Play	Silesians Together	978	0.01	0	New
Poland Fair Play	Independents	73,035	0.54	0	New
Poland Fair Play	Total	74,013	0.54	0	New
PolEXIT - Coalition	Congress of the New Right	3,720	0.03	0	–4
PolEXIT - Coalition	Independents	4,180	0.03	0	0
PolEXIT - Coalition	Total	7,900	0.06	0	–4
Unity of the Nation	Unity of the Nation	585	0.00	0	New
Unity of the Nation	Independents	1,626	0.01	0	New
Unity of the Nation	Total	2,211	0.02	0	New
Total		13,647,311	100.00	52	+1
Valid votes		13,647,311	99.17		
Invalid/blank votes		113,663	0.83		
Total votes		13,760,974	100.00		
Registered voters/turnout		30,118,852	45.69		
Source: PKW

== Constituencies ==
=== 1st constituency (Pomeranian) ===
Electoral committee	Votes	%	Seats
European Coalition	419,182	50.66	2
Law and Justice	285,740	34.53	1
Spring	50,862	6.15	–
Confederation	33,188	4.01	–
Kukiz'15	22,114	2.67	–
Poland Fair Play	8,425	1.02	–
Left Together	7,946	0.96	–
Total	827,457	100.00	3
Valid votes	827,457	99.24	
Invalid/blank votes	6,327	0.76	
Total votes	833,784	100.00	
Registered voters/turnout	1,765,086	47.24	
Source: National Electoral Commission

=== 2nd constituency (Kuyavian-Pomeranian) ===
Electoral committee	Votes	%	Seats
European Coalition	305,362	46.01	1
Law and Justice	260,408	39.24	1
Spring	39,412	5.94	–
Kukiz'15	25,694	3.87	–
Confederation	25,223	3.80	–
Left Together	7,533	1.14	–
Total	663,632	100.00	2
Valid votes	663,632	99.13	
Invalid/blank votes	5,837	0.87	
Total votes	669,469	100.00	
Registered voters/turnout	1,603,561	41.75	
Source: National Electoral Commission

=== 3rd constituency (Podlaskie and Warmian–Masurian) ===
Electoral committee	Votes	%	Seats
Law and Justice	375,001	47.29	2
European Coalition	293,677	37.03	1
Spring	45,424	5.73	–
Confederation	38,866	4.90	–
Kukiz'15	28,512	3.60	–
Left Together	11,517	1.45	–
Total	792,997	100.00	3
Valid votes	792,997	99.14	
Invalid/blank votes	6,849	0.86	
Total votes	799,846	100.00	
Registered voters/turnout	2,054,446	38.93	
Source: National Electoral Commission

=== 4th constituency (Warsaw) ===
Electoral committee	Votes	%	Seats
European Coalition	625,719	45.17	3
Law and Justice	447,770	32.32	2
Spring	142,443	10.28	1
Confederation	71,784	5.18	–
Kukiz'15	49,824	3.60	–
Left Together	24,778	1.79	–
Poland Fair Play	22,988	1.66	–
Total	1,385,306	100.00	6
Valid votes	1,385,306	99.48	
Invalid/blank votes	7,292	0.52	
Total votes	1,392,598	100.00	
Registered voters/turnout	2,306,657	60.37	
Source: National Electoral Commission

=== 5th constituency (Masovian) ===
Electoral committee	Votes	%	Seats
Law and Justice	512,158	60.20	2
European Coalition	227,106	26.69	1
Confederation	34,923	4.10	–
Spring	33,302	3.91	–
Kukiz'15	27,829	3.27	–
Poland Fair Play	6,784	0.80	–
Left Together	6,434	0.76	–
Unity of the Nation	2,211	0.26	–
Total	850,747	100.00	3
Valid votes	850,747	99.06	
Invalid/blank votes	8,053	0.94	
Total votes	858,800	100.00	
Registered voters/turnout	1,982,688	43.31	
Source: National Electoral Commission

=== 6th constituency (Łódź) ===
Electoral committee	Votes	%	Seats
Law and Justice	426,046	46.69	2
European Coalition	347,620	38.09	1
Spring	50,696	5.56	–
Confederation	37,899	4.15	–
Kukiz'15	32,476	3.56	–
Left Together	17,849	1.96	–
Total	912,586	100.00	3
Valid votes	912,586	99.22	
Invalid/blank votes	7,207	0.78	
Total votes	919,793	100.00	
Registered voters/turnout	1,960,252	46.92	
Source: National Electoral Commission

=== 7th constituency (Greater Poland) ===
Electoral committee	Votes	%	Seats
European Coalition	518,706	43.25	2
Law and Justice	460,432	38.39	2
Spring	93,504	7.80	1
Confederation	55,970	4.67	–
Kukiz'15	51,500	4.29	–
Left Together	19,226	1.60	–
Total	1,199,338	100.00	5
Valid votes	1,199,338	99.06	
Invalid/blank votes	11,439	0.94	
Total votes	1,210,777	100.00	
Registered voters/turnout	2,699,054	44.86	
Source: National Electoral Commission

=== 8th constituency (Lublin) ===
Electoral committee	Votes	%	Seats
Law and Justice	436,139	58.95	2
European Coalition	208,392	28.17	1
Confederation	32,706	4.42	–
Kukiz'15	29,567	4.00	–
Spring	22,692	3.07	–
Left Together	5,302	0.72	–
Poland Fair Play	5,071	0.69	–
Total	739,869	100.00	3
Valid votes	739,869	98.91	
Invalid/blank votes	8,153	1.09	
Total votes	748,022	100.00	
Registered voters/turnout	1,706,080	43.84	
Source: National Electoral Commission

=== 9th constituency (Subcarpathian) ===
Electoral committee	Votes	%	Seats
Law and Justice	485,779	65.07	2
European Coalition	160,988	21.56	1
Confederation	43,976	5.89	–
Kukiz'15	25,216	3.38	–
Spring	22,881	3.06	–
Left Together	5,308	0.71	–
PolEXIT-Coalition	2,388	0.32	–
Total	746,536	100.00	3
Valid votes	746,536	99.15	
Invalid/blank votes	6,396	0.85	
Total votes	752,932	100.00	
Registered voters/turnout	1,702,111	44.24	
Source: National Electoral Commission

=== 10th constituency (Lesser Poland and Świętokrzyskie) ===
Electoral committee	Votes	%	Seats
Law and Justice	980,816	56.33	4
European Coalition	505,400	29.03	2
Spring	78,568	4.51	–
Confederation	73,613	4.23	–
Kukiz'15	67,272	3.86	–
Left Together	16,813	0.97	–
Poland Fair Play	13,128	0.75	–
PolEXIT-Coalition	5,512	0.32	–
Total	1,741,122	100.00	6
Valid votes	1,741,122	99.15	
Invalid/blank votes	15,006	0.85	
Total votes	1,756,128	100.00	
Registered voters/turnout	3,667,333	47.89	
Source: National Electoral Commission

=== 11th constituency (Silesian) ===
Electoral committee	Votes	%	Seats
Law and Justice	691,641	43.25	3
European Coalition	643,567	40.24	3
Spring	93,120	5.82	1
Confederation	73,761	4.61	–
Kukiz'15	60,812	3.80	–
Left Together	18,813	1.18	–
Poland Fair Play	17,617	1.10	–
Total	1,599,331	100.00	7
Valid votes	1,599,331	99.23	
Invalid/blank votes	12,389	0.77	
Total votes	1,611,720	100.00	
Registered voters/turnout	3,514,574	45.86	
Source: National Electoral Commission

=== 12th constituency (Lower Silesian and Opole) ===
Electoral committee	Votes	%	Seats
European Coalition	574,397	43.87	2
Law and Justice	506,921	38.72	2
Spring	88,515	6.76	–
Confederation	65,208	4.98	–
Kukiz'15	56,807	4.34	–
Left Together	17,437	1.33	–
Total	1,309,285	100.00	4
Valid votes	1,309,285	99.22	
Invalid/blank votes	10,265	0.78	
Total votes	1,319,550	100.00	
Registered voters/turnout	3,051,668	43.24	
Source: National Electoral Commission

=== 13th constituency (Lubusz and West Pomeranian) ===
Electoral committee	Votes	%	Seats
European Coalition	419,819	47.76	2
Law and Justice	323,929	36.85	2
Spring	65,556	7.46	–
Confederation	34,071	3.88	–
Kukiz'15	25,941	2.95	–
Left Together	9,789	1.11	–
Total	879,105	100.00	4
Valid votes	879,105	99.19	
Invalid/blank votes	7,177	0.81	
Total votes	886,282	100.00	
Registered voters/turnout	2,105,342	42.10	
Source: National Electoral Commission
