= Radziszewski =

Radziszewski is a Polish surname. Notable people with the surname include:

- Piotr Radziszewski (born 1970), Polish urologist
- Ray Radziszewski (born 1935), American basketball player
