= Party of Drivers =

Party of Drivers Partia Kierowców
- Leader: Lech Kędzierski
- Spokesperson: Halszka Bielecka
- Founded: 2 April 2019
- Dissolved: 19 December 2022
- Headquarters: Broniewskiego 5D; 98-200 Sieradz
- Ideology: Right-wing populism Right-libertarianism; Anti-environmentalism; Euroscepticism
- Political position: Right-wing to far-right
- National affiliation: Confederation Liberty and Independence
- Slogan: Sami kierujemy swoim życiem ("We steer our own lives")
- Sejm: 0 / 460
- Senate: 0 / 100
- European Parliament: 0 / 51
- Regional assemblies: 0 / 552

Website
- http://www.partiakierowcow.pl

Party of Drivers (Polish: Partia Kierowców) was a minor political party in Poland with the aim of "fighting for the rights of drivers and hauliers". The party was founded in April 2019 and wanted to participate in the 2019 European Parliament election in Poland on the idea of representing the interests of Polish drivers. The party founders had ties with right-wing parties such as the Congress of the New Right, and formed a coalition with the Piotr Liroy-Marzec's Effective party in August 2019. In September 2019, the party joined the right-wing coalition of Confederation Liberty and Independence and ran in the 2019 Polish parliamentary election.

The main goal of the party was to fight for road quality, simpler road regulations, reduction of bike lanes as well as the cheapest possible fuel prices. The party also believed that Polish drivers were affected by "double taxation" and wanted to severely cut taxes connected to car ownership and fuel prices. The Party of Drivers believed that drivers belonged to "one of the most discriminated groups" in Poland and wishes to represent their interests. The party stated that it wished to abolish "road absurdities" and argued that the regulations of the European Union were unfair and harmful to drivers. The party also wanted to restore the death penalty in Poland.

== History ==
The first attempt to form the Party of Drivers took place in August 2006, when Krzysztof Chmiel announced his plans to form a party under the name Partia Kierowców. The main goals of the party were to defend the interests of Polish drivers, reducing fuel and road taxes, and increasing the number of roads and highways in Poland. However, the party failed to gain the 1000 signatures necessary to register the party.

The party was successfully registered on 2 April 2019; Lech Kędzierski was elected as the leader of the party, Paweł Kubalski became the vice-president, and Halszka Bielecka was chosen as the spokesperson. Kubalski declared that the board of the party would be entirely made up of people working in driving professions. The party announced that it will participate in the 2019 European Parliament election in Poland as well as the 2019 Polish parliamentary election.

The leadership of the party had ties to right-wing political parties. The spokesperson of the party, Halszka Bielecka, was previously a member of the Congress of the New Right, and was known for collecting signatures for the party's "Stop Islamisation of Europe" petition. In October 2018, Bielecka stood for election to the city council of Wrocław from the list of a right-wing populist party Kukiz'15.

On the press conference announcing its creation and participation in the 2019 elections, the Party of Drivers promised to be a "substantive party" that would protect the rights of drivers as well as transport operators, and stated that it wanted to fight "road absurdities" and the "fiscalisation" of traffic, arguing that the Polish taxation system was predatory and collected an unfair amount of money from drivers. The party also attacked the European Union, arguing that it provided an "unequal playing field" for drivers.

In August 2019, the Party of Drivers announced that it would be joining the right-wing Piotr Liroy-Marzec's Effective party and run together in the 2019 Polish parliamentary election, which revealed the right-wing orientation of the Party of Drivers. In the official announcement by the party, the Party of Drivers argued: "We think that Mr Liroy-Marzec will help drivers, which he has already done in his term, and we will cooperate and act for the good of Polish transport, for the good of Polish drivers in the next term." However, eventually both parties decided to run together with the Confederation Liberty and Independence instead.

In September 2019, Confederation Liberty and Independence announced that the Party of Drivers had joined its coalition, and the party's candidate would be on top of the Confederation's electoral list in Legnica. Janusz Korwin-Mikke told the media that he was "very pleased at the fact that the Drivers' Party has decided to support the Confederation". Mikke called drivers the "most oppressed" group in Poland, stating: "Drivers are being exterminated in every way, punished, restricted and, worst of all, huge taxes on petrol are being transferred, against all laws, to the competition - to the railways".

== Ideology ==
The founders of the Party of Drivers were formerly members of the Congress of the New Right, and the party formed coalitions with right-wing parties such as the Confederation Liberty and Independence and the Piotr Liroy-Marzec's Effective party. The party espoused anti-EU rhetoric, arguing that "the European Parliament, breaking all standards, practically eliminated Polish transport companies and our professional drivers from the European market".

The party believed that laws implemented to improve safety were an attack on the freedom of Polish drivers. The party's main program proposal was "the fulfilment of the just and natural demands of Polish drivers - probably the most exploited and oppressed Polish minority", which included a reduction in fuel excise duty and a ban on excise duty subsidies for "competing modes of transport", such as railways, trolleybuses and aircraft. The party wanted to reduce the number of bike lanes, arguing that they were mostly unused and "prevent the widening of the carriageway". The party wanted to abolish speed limits, arguing that most of them were absurd and have most drivers exceeded them anyway. Lastly, the party wanted to restore the death penalty in Poland.

According to the leaders of the party, the Party of Drivers was to be a "substantive party" that wanted to protect the rights of drivers, but also transport operators. It also wanted to fight "road absurdities" and the "fiscalisation" of traffic, which it defined as a system of fines whose purpose was not to improve road safety but to collect money from drivers. The party believed that traffic laws should be simplified and loosened, and that the drivers were disadvantaged and overtaxed.

The party argued that the driver training system in Poland "produces cripples and fatal accidents", and accuses the Polish governments of creating a system of ""fiscalisation, on failing at exams, just to buy more exams". The party also wished to be "defending citizens against the mandate lawlessness tolerated by `justice', against mass extortion of unlawful charges and fighting against hidden public tributes".

The Party of Drivers also accused the government of anti-car rhetoric, believing that what most Poles "have heard about road safety, about the work of drivers, for the last 25 years is a mass of nonsense and stereotypes". The party planned to introduce modern roads where it would be possible to travel at speeds of up to 200 km/h.

On its website, the party listed the following four points as its main goals:

- Cheap fuel - reducing the price of fuel by removing the excise duty imposed on it;
- Rapid transport - removal of speed limits on motorways and wherever they are not necessary, extension of the motorway network;
- Motor insurance reform - comprehensive motor insurance reform that will cut costs;
- Vignettes instead of toll gates - replacing tolls at motorway gates with vignettes to prevent traffic jams and inconvenient payments.
