= National League (Poland, 2007) =

National League Liga Narodowa
- Abbreviation: LN
- President: Zbigniew Lipiński (LN, 2013–2023)
- Chairperson: Bogusław Kowalski (RLN, 2007–2011)
- Founded: January 11, 2007; as Ruch Ludowo-Narodowy (National People's Movement)
- Dissolved: February 6, 2023; 2 years ago
- Headquarters: Jerusalem Ave. 83, 02-001 Warsaw, Poland
- Ideology: National Democracy (Poland), Euroscepticism, Economic solidarism

The National League (Polish: Liga Narodowa, LN), formerly the National People's Movement (Polish: Ruch Ludowo-Narodowy, RLN) until 2013, was a minor Polish political party founded on 11 January 2007.

Starting in 2019, the party was a part of Konfederacja Wolność i Niepodległość, a nationalist, conservative and monarchist coalition of parties.

The party was deregistered in 2023 for failing to submit financial statements for 2021.

== Election results ==
=== Sejm ===
Election year	Votes	%	Rank	Seats
2019	1,256,953	6.81	4th	0 / 460
2019	Confederation coalition, won 11 seats in total			

=== Presidential ===
Election year	Candidate	1st round		2nd round	
Election year	Candidate	# of overall votes	% of overall vote	# of overall votes	% of overall vote
2020	Supporting Krzysztof Bosak	1,317,380	6.78 (#4)		
