= Minimum wage in Poland =

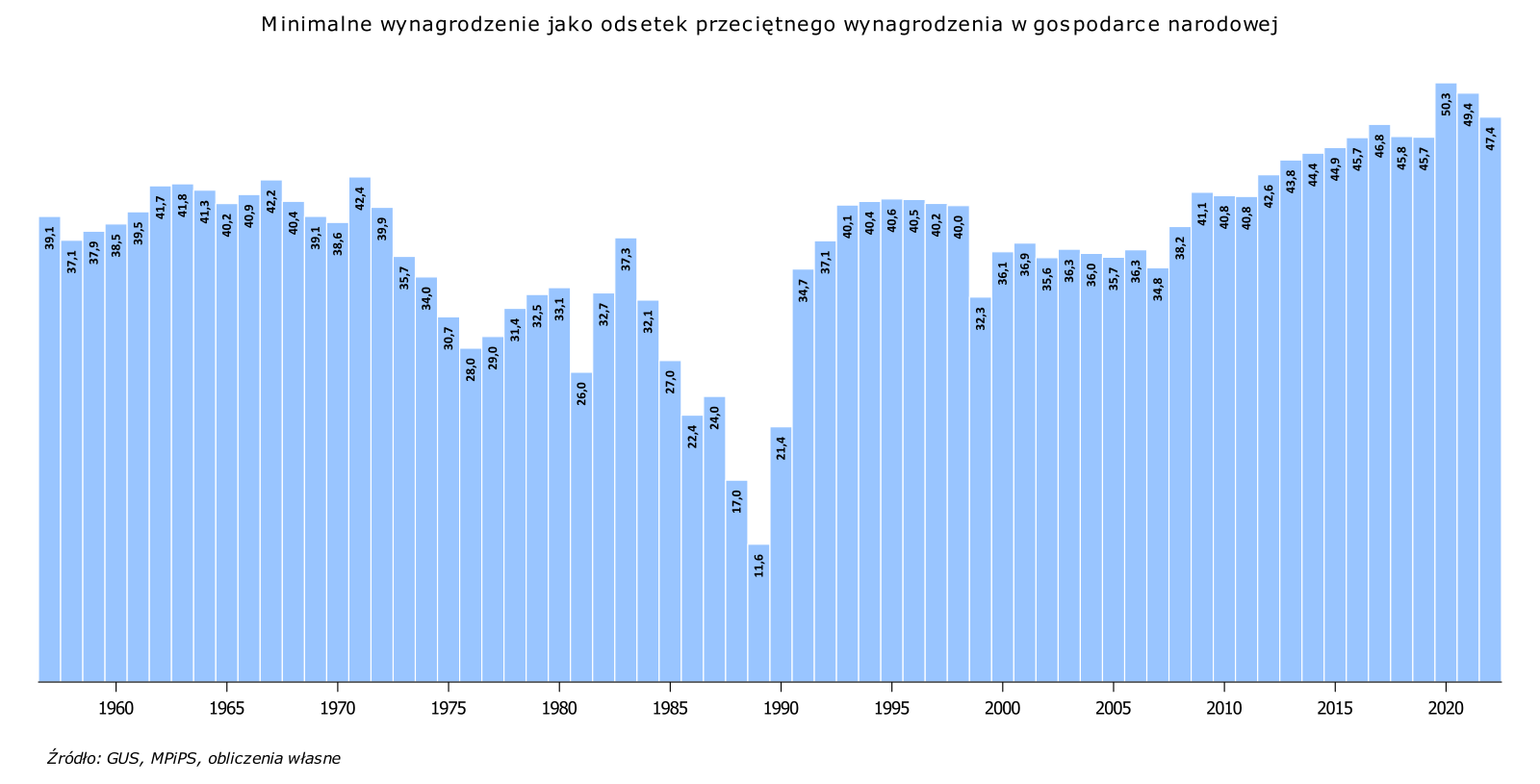
(In Polish) Minimum wage as a percentage of the average wage in the national economy of Poland.

The minimum wage in Poland is the lowest monthly or hourly remuneration that employers are legally allowed to pay their workers in Poland. The sum is decided by the Polish government.

Before January 1, 2017 minimum wage did not apply to free-for-task agreements which were used to circumvent minimum wage laws resulting in wages far below the national minimum. In 2013, almost 1.5 milion workers were employed on such contracts.

In Poland, the statutory minimum wage consists of a monthly minimum remuneration for employees under employment contracts and a separate minimum hourly rate applicable to certain civil-law contracts, including contracts of mandate and service contracts. The minimum monthly remuneration for part-time employees is calculated proportionally to their working time, while the minimum hourly rate is determined separately and does not represent an hourly conversion of the monthly minimum. When determining whether an employee receives at least the statutory minimum, certain remuneration components are excluded, including overtime pay, night-work allowances and seniority allowances.

Minimum gross monthly wage in Poland, 1994–2027
From	Minimum wage in PLN	Change	Adjusted for inflation 2021 / (2021)	Value in euro in year of introduction
1 January 2027	4,950	+3.00%		
1 January 2026	4,806	+3.00%	(3439)	€1137.06
1 January 2025	4,666	+8.51% (YoY +10.00%)	(3359)	€1093.56
1 July 2024	4,300	+1.37% (YoY +19.44%)	(3210)	
1 January 2024	4,242	+17.83% (YoY +21.55%)	(3167)	€976.65
1 July 2023	3,600	+3.10% (YoY +19.60%)	(2994)	
1 January 2023	3,490	+15.94%	(2903)	€745.98
1 January 2022	3,010	+7.50%	(2864)	€655.93
1 January 2021	2,800	+7.69%	(2800); 2800	€613.34
1 January 2020	2,600	+15.56%	2731	€585.19
1 January 2019	2,250	+7.14%	2444	€523.55
1 January 2018	2,100	+5.00%	2331	€492.78
1 January 2017	2,000	+8.10%	2261	€469.81
1 January 2016	1,850	+5.71%	2134	€424
1 January 2015	1,750	+4.17%	2006	€418.25
1 January 2014	1,680	+5.00%	1909	€401.5
1 January 2013	1,600	+6.67%	1819	€381.18
1 January 2012	1,500	+8.23%	1722	€358.45
1 January 2011	1,386	+5.24%	1648	€336.36
1 January 2010	1,317	+3.21%	1632	€329.69
1 January 2009	1,276	+13.32%	1622	€294.85
1 January 2008	1,126	+20.30%	1486	€320.61
1 January 2007	936	+4.10%	1286	€247.38
1 January 2006	899.10	+5.90%	1266	€230.76
1 January 2005	849	+3.03%	1211	€211.04
1 January 2004	824	+3.00%	1201	€182.03
1 January 2003	800	+5.26%	1205	€181.83
2002	-	-	1153	€197.02
1 January 2001	760	+8.57%	1175	€206.97
1 March 2000	700	+4.48%	1141	€174.64
1 November 1999	670	+26.89%	1200	€158.49
1 January 1999	528	+5.60%	946	€124.9
1 February 1998	500	+11.11%	959	€127.67
1 July 1997	450	+10.84%	964	€121.11
1 February 1997	406	+3.84%	869	€109.27
1 January 1997	391	+5.68%	837	€105.23
1 July 1996	370	+5.71%	910	€108.11
1 April 1996	350	+7.69%	861	€102.27
1 January 1996	325	+6.56%	800	€94.97
1 October 1995	305	+3.39%	899	€96.2
1 July 1995	295	+5.36%	870	€93.05
1 April 1995	280	+7.69%	825	€88.31
1 January 1995	260	+8.33%	766	€82.01
1 October 1994	240	+9.09%	905	€88.84
1 July 1994	220	+7.32%	830	€81.44

On 7 July 1994 Polish złoty (PLZ) was denominated at a rate 10000:1 to new Polish złoty (PLN). The new currency was introduced on 1 January 1995, and was used concurrently with the old one until the end of 1996.

Minimum gross monthly wage in Poland, before denomination, 1970-1996
From	Minimum wage in PLZ
1 VII 1996	3 700 000
1 IV 1996	3 500 000
1 I 1996	3 250 000
1 X 1995	3 050 000
1 VII 1995	2 950 000
1 IV 1995	2 800 000
1 I 1995	2 600 000
1 X 1994	2 400 000
1 VII 1994	2 200 000
1 IV 1994	2 050 000
1 I 1994	1 950 000
1 X 1993	1 750 000
1 VII 1993	1 650 000
1 I 1993	1 500 000
1 X 1992	1 350 000
1 IX 1992	1 300 000
1 VIII 1992	1 200 000
1 V 1992	1 000 000
1 I 1992	875 000
1 XII 1991	700 000
1 X 1991	652 000
1 VII 1991	632 000
1 IV 1991	605 000
1 I 1991	550 000
1 X 1990	440 000
1 IX 1990	368 000
1 I 1990	120 000
1 X 1989	38 000
1 VII 1989	22 100
1 I 1989	17 800
1 I 1988	9000
1 I 1987	7000
1 I 1986	5400
1 IX 1982	5400
1 I 1982	3000
1 I 1980	2000
1 V 1979	1800
1 V 1978	1600
1 V 1977	1400
1 VIII 1974	1200
1 XII 1970	1000

== See also ==
- List of European countries by minimum wage
