= Confederation Liberty and Independence =

Political party and coalition in Poland

Confederation Liberty and Independence Konfederacja Wolność i Niepodległość
- Abbreviation: KWiN
- Co-chairman: Sławomir Mentzen; Krzysztof Bosak
- Party Leaders: Konrad Berkowicz; Krzysztof Bosak; Robert Iwaszkiewicz; Sławomir Mentzen; Bartłomiej Pejo; Krzysztof Tuduj; Witold Tumanowicz
- Founders: Janusz Korwin-Mikke, Grzegorz Braun, Piotr Liroy-Marzec, Robert Winnicki, Kaja Godek
- Founded: 6 December 2018
- Headquarters: ul. Wiejska 12a, 00-490 Warsaw
- Membership (2025): ~11,500
- Ideology: Right-wing populism; Economic liberalism; National conservatism; Euroscepticism
- Political position: Right-wing to far-right
- European affiliation: Europe of Sovereign Nations (NN); Patriots.eu (RN)
- European Parliament group: Europe of Sovereign Nations (NN); Patriots for Europe (RN)
- Members: National Movement; New Hope
- Sejm: 16 / 460 (3%)
- Senate: 0 / 100 (0%)
- European Parliament: 5 / 53 (9%)
- Regional assemblies: 2 / 552 (0.4%)
- City Mayors: 1 / 107 (0.9%)
- Powiat Councils: 5 / 6,170 (0.08%)
- Gmina Councils: 17 / 39,416 (0.04%)

Website
- konfederacja.pl

The Confederation Liberty and Independence (Polish: Konfederacja Wolność i Niepodległość, KWiN), frequently shortened to just Confederation (Konfederacja), is a far-right political alliance in Poland. It was initially founded in 2018 as a political coalition for the 2019 European Parliament election, although it was later expanded into a political party in order to circumvent the 8% vote threshold for coalitions to enter the national parliament. It won 11 seats in the Sejm after the 2019 parliamentary election. Its candidate for the 2020 presidential election was Krzysztof Bosak, who placed fourth among eleven candidates.

A coalition made up of New Hope and the National Movement, it is right-wing oriented and is considered to be a part of the radical right. It has expressed right-wing populist rhetoric and a more hardline opposition stance towards the European Union and immigration. It is economically liberal and has called for lowering taxes, and has also expressed socially conservative and Polish nationalist stances.

== History ==
Two political parties, KORWiN and National Movement, announced in late 2018 that they had decided to run together in the 2019 European Parliament election in Poland. In early 2019, Grzegorz Braun's organization and Piotr Krzysztof Liroy-Marzec's party joined the coalition. Kaja Godek, an ultraconservative activist, announced that she would join the list. The coalition was initially dubbed the Pro-Polish Coalition. By late February 2019, it was changed to Konfederacja Korwin Braun Liroy Narodowcy. In March 2019, an application was submitted to register the party under that name, and the Federation for the Republic of Poland soon joined the alliance, including some representatives. Its name was changed again, this time to Confederation. In April the Party of Drivers joined the coalition, which soon afterward elected Marek Jakubiak as its chairman. The Confederation placed fourth in the 2019 European Parliament election, winning 4.55% of the popular vote, although it did not reach the electoral threshold. After the election, Braun applied for the registration of the Confederation of the Polish Crown.

The coalition was registered on 25 July 2019 under the name Confederation Liberty and Independence. Godek left the coalition soon after. Shortly before the 2019 Polish parliamentary election, a schism occurred in the coalition, with many representatives joining the coalition while some of them also left. The coalition ended up winning 6.81% of the popular vote and won 11 seats in the Sejm. Most of the support the party received was in southeast and northern parts of Poland. Around 20% of all young voters aged under-30 supported the grouping, about two-thirds of its voters were male, and more than three-fifths lived in smaller towns and rural areas. This has been highlighted as a significant change from previous right-wing alliances involving Korwin-Mikke where the base of support was almost exclusively young males. In November 2019, they presented nine candidates that took part in the 2019–20 Confederation presidential primary. The winner of the presidential primary was Krzysztof Bosak, who became the coalition candidate for the 2020 Polish presidential election. During the first round of the election, Bosak received 1,317,380 votes or 6.78%, coming fourth among eleven candidates.

In 2022, serious internal splits emerged as a result of Janusz Korwin-Mikke's pro-Russian and Ukrainophobic stances in light of the Russian invasion of Ukraine, causing several members to renounce their KORWiN memberships, albeit remaining within the coalition. Ahead of the 2023 Polish parliamentary election, they were considered possible kingmakers. Bosak, one of Confederation's leaders, said: "Confederation has no intention of prolonging PiS's power or facilitating Tusk's return to power. The majority of our voters do not want this." Korwin-Mikke, a former member of the European Parliament who ran for the party from the Warsaw region in 2023, has a history of sexist statements about women. He said: "I am against voting rights for women. This is biology. A woman at the age of 55, when estrogen stops working, reaches the age when she can finally vote." Ryszard Zajączkowski, a university professor and one of the coalition's candidates, said that Poles were subjected to what he described as genocide "at the hands of Jews working together with communists" after World War II, and said that communism is worse than fascism. He said: "Compared to which the Auschwitz camp could be called a holiday camp." In October 2023, Korwin-Mikke was suspended from the party.

In the 2023 Polish parliamentary election, the Confederation ended up winning 7.16% of the popular vote and won 18 seats in the Sejm.

On April 21, 2024, in the second round of the presidential elections in Bełchatów, Patryk Marjan, a member of New Hope, was elected, becoming the party's first city president.

In August 2024, the Council of Leaders declared Sławomir Mentzen as the formation's candidate in the upcoming 2025 presidential election, who became the first major politician to start his presidential campaign. Despite this decision, on 15 January 2025, Grzegorz Braun, leader of the affiliate party, announced his intent to also run in the election, confirming previous speculations. As a result, Braun was expelled from the KWiN on 17 January. Janusz Korwin-Mikke, founder and former member of the KWiN, has expressed support for Braun's candidacy.

On 8 March 2025, party congress, which convenes once every five years, elected new Council of Leaders excluding foregoing representatives from Braun's party Włodzimierz Skalik and Robert Iwaszkiewicz, which were also expelled from the KWiN earlier that week. On 10 March, Braun's party MPs Skalik and Roman Fritz decided to leave the Confederation parliamentary group, which now counts 16 members.

== Ideology and position ==
Confederation Liberty and Independence is positioned on the far right on the political spectrum. It is also considered to be a part of the radical right.

Its ideology includes support for numerous right-wing populist ideas. It has presented a hardline opposition stance to the European Union, and has criticized its and Law and Justice's policies towards immigration, calling for harder stances against legal immigration instead. It is also socially conservative, and anti-feminist, it also supports total ban on abortion, and supports the traditional family model. It has also expressed xenophobic views, and has openly provided support for antisemitism. When it first ran in the 2019 European Parliament election, Sławomir Mentzen said: "We don't want Jews, homosexuals, abortion, taxes and the European Union." He has since tried to distance himself from this. During the COVID-19 pandemic, it has also spread misinformation about COVID-19 and opposed laws that were implemented by the government.

Unlike the Law and Justice, its economic position is orientated towards economic liberalism, and it is considered strongly pro-free market. It is Polish nationalist, and has also been described as national-liberal. In its program, they have stated their goal "to turn Poland into a ethnocracy and culturally homogenous nation built around traditionalist-Catholic principles". It has also expressed nativist sentiment.

The party has supported weapons, financial aid and diplomatic support for Ukraine following the 2022 Russian invasion of Ukraine, but argued that these should be conditioned on contracts for postwar rebuilding being guaranteed to Polish companies. It is strongly critical of the European Union, arguing that Poland “has been harassed by EU bureaucrats" and that the EU forces an agenda detrimental to Poland in climate, agriculture, and migration policies. The party calls for national independence and self-sufficiency in foreign matters, criticizing Polish dependency on NATO. Confederation stated that Ukraine is a source of “unfair competition” for Poland, and advocates stricter border security, opposing immigration from Ukraine as well as other countries outside of the European Union.

=== Platform ===
Confederation's platform includes the following promises, as well as others:

- Taxation
  - Eliminate income tax
  - Make social insurance contributions optional
  - Reduce gasoline taxes
  - Reduce government spending
- Judicial
  - Hire more judges' assistants
  - Restore capital punishment
- Education
  - Create a school voucher program
  - Allow parents to opt-out their children from sex-education classes
  - Create a cultural voucher that can be used on arts or museums
- National security
  - Allow licensed civilians to own firearms
  - Allow the use of nuclear energy
  - Oppose the European Union's refugee resettlement program
  - Oppose increases in immigration
  - Require immigrants to integrate into Polish culture
- Health
  - Ban importation of garbage
  - Oppose the European Union's climate change rules
  - Restrict access to abortion
- Business
  - Abolish penalties for street trade and raise the limits on unlicensed trade.
  - Raise the VAT exemption to 400,000zł
  - Index the tax exempt threshold to approximately twelve times the minimum wage
  - Allow businesses to refuse services on moral grounds

== Composition ==
=== Current political parties ===
Name	Ideology	Position	Leader	MPs	Senators	MEPs	Sejmiks	Entry
New Hope	Right-libertarianism; Conservatism	Far-right	Sławomir Mentzen	8 / 460	0 / 100	3 / 53	0 / 552	6 December 2018
National Movement	Ultranationalism; National conservatism	Far-right	Krzysztof Bosak	7 / 460	0 / 100	2 / 53	0 / 552	6 December 2018

=== Current organisations and movements ===
Name	Ideology	Position	Leader	Type	Entry
Agrarian-Consumer Confederation	Agrarianism		Krzysztof Tołwiński	Informal organisation	29 November 2019
Conservative-Monarchist Club	Catholic fundamentalism	Far-right	Adam Wielomski	Philosophical and journalistic organisation	7 January 2019
White-Red Movement	Economic nationalism	Right-wing	Ewa Zajączkowska-Hernik	Political association	3 June 2026

=== Former political parties ===
Name	Ideology	Position	Leader	Entry	Exit
Federation for the Republic	Conservatism; Direct democracy	Right-wing	Marek Jakubiak	6 March 2019	28 June 2019
Effective	Direct-democracy; Hard Euroscepticism	Right-wing	Piotr "Liroy" Marzec	1 September 2018	28 June 2019
Wolnościowcy	Right-libertarianism	Right-wing	Artur Dziambor	17 March 2022	13 February 2023
Party of Drivers	Right-wing populism Anti-environmentalism	Right-wing to far-right	Lech Kędzierski	10 April 2019	19 December 2022
Union of Christian Families	Christian democracy Catholic nationalism	Right-wing	Bogusław Rogalski	13 August 2019	2024
National League	National democracy Polish nationalism	Right-wing	Lech Kędzierski	2019	2023
Confederation of the Polish Crown	Enthronement; Political Catholicism; Ultranationalism	Far-right	Grzegorz Braun	7 September 2019	17 January 2025

=== Political parties who had members with individual agreements ===
Name	Ideology	Position	Leader*	Election	Notes
Free and Solidary	Conservatism	Right-wing to far-right	Kornel Morawiecki	2019 Polish parliamentary election	4 party members were candidates for Piotr Liroy-Marzec's Efficient political party electoral committee in Constituency № 35 (Olsztyn) whilst the rest of the party, including its entire parliamentary club, were on Law and Justice's electoral lists.
Congress of the New Right	Right-libertarianism; Economic liberalism Hard Euroscepticism	Right-wing	Stanisław Żółtek	2019 Polish parliamentary election	Used Federation for the Republic of Poland's electoral lists, which in turn were in agreement with the Right Wing of the Republic, and fielded candidates in the Kraków constituencies.
League of Polish Families	Political Catholicism	Right-wing to far-right	Witold Bałażak	2019 Polish parliamentary election	Despite being loosely affiliated with the Polish Coalition, they fielded only 1 candidate in Kraków from their electoral lists, whereas 2 other candidates used Confederation's electoral lists.
National Unity (pl)	Political Catholicism; Paleoconservatism	Far-right	Gabriel Janowski	2019 Polish parliamentary election	Vice-chair of the party Paweł Połanecki was a candidate for Piotr Liroy-Marzec's Efficient political party electoral committee in the Kielce constituency, as no.2 on the list behind Piotr Liroy-Marzec himself.
*At the time in question

=== Former organisations and movements ===
Name	Ideology	Position	Leader	Type	Entry	Exit
Life and Family Foundation	Anti-abortion movement Anti-LGBT	Far-right	Kaja Godek	Lobbyist foundation, social activist group	28 January 2019	9 August 2019

== Election results ==
=== Presidential ===
Election year	Candidate	1st round		2nd round	
Election year	Candidate	No. of overall votes	% of overall vote	No. of overall votes	% of overall vote
2020	Krzysztof Bosak	1,317,380	6.78 (#4)		
2025	Sławomir Mentzen	2,890,530	14.82 (#3)		

=== Sejm ===
Election	Votes	%	Seats	+/–	Government
2019	1,256,953	6.81 (#5)	11 / 460	▲11	PiS
2023	1,547,364	7.16 (#5)	18 / 460	▲7	KO–PL2050–KP–NL

=== Senate ===
Election	Votes	%	Seats	+/–	Government
2019	144,124	0.79 (#6)	0 / 100	0	KO–KP–SLD
2023	1,443,836	6.75 (#6)	0 / 100	0	KO–PL2050–KP–NL–LR

=== European Parliament ===
Election	Votes	%	Seats	+/–	EP Group
2019	621,188	4.55 (#4)	0 / 52	New	–
2024	1,420,287	12.08 (#3)	6 / 53	▲6	ESN / PfE / NI

=== Regional assemblies ===
Election year	Votes	%	Seats	Change
2024	1,042,328	7.23 (#4)	2 / 552	▲2
2024	In coalition with Agreement and Bezpartyjni Samorządowcy which won 6 seats in total.			

=== Internal ===
Year	Election type	Affiliation	Final Candidate	Number of initial candidates	Number of rounds	Final round	
Year	Election type	Affiliation	Final Candidate	Number of initial candidates	Number of rounds	Electoral vote	Percentage
2019–20	American-style presidential primary	RN	Bosak	9	1x 16 regional preliminaries 7x convention elimination	163	51.9%
2019–20	American-style presidential primary	KKP	Braun	9	1x 16 regional preliminaries 7x convention elimination	146	46.5%

== See also ==
- Broad fire extinguisher front
- Kukiz'15
- United Right
