= Liroy =

Polish rapper and politician (born 1971)

Piotr Liroy
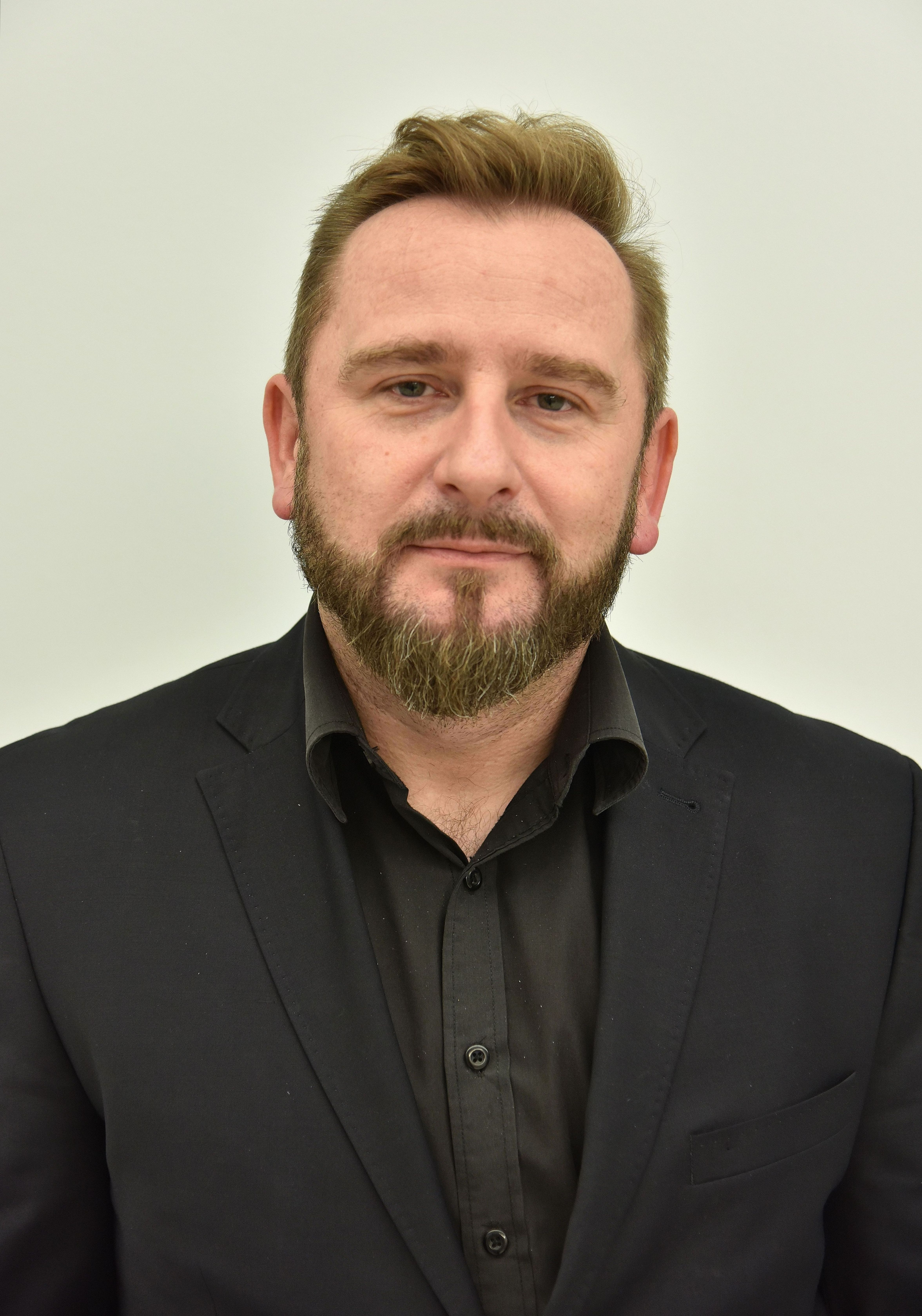

Member of Sejm
- In office 12 November 2015 – 11 November 2019

Personal details
- Born: Piotr Krzysztof Marzec; July 12, 1971 (age 55) Busko Zdrój, Poland
- Party: Skuteczni (2017–)
- Other political affiliations: Kukiz'15 (2015–2017), Confederation (2019)
- Occupation: Rapper, actor, music producer, member of the Sejm
- Website: www.liroy.com.pl
- Musical career
- Also known as: Liroy, L, Grand Papa Rapa, Szakal, Scyzoryk, PM Cool Lee
- Genre: Rap
- Years active: 1982–present
- Labels: BMG Poland, Def Entertainment

Piotr Krzysztof Liroy-Marzec (born July 12, 1971, in Busko Zdrój, Poland as Piotr Krzysztof Marzec), better known as Liroy (Leeroy), is a Polish rapper and politician.

He is one of the pioneers of rap and hip-hop culture in Poland. His CDs include East On Da Mic (as PM Cool Lee), Albóóm, Bafangoo Part 1, L, Bafangoo Part 2 (Dzień Szaka-La), Bestseller and L-Nińo vol. 1.

In 2015, he retired from his music career and was elected as a member of the Sejm. He was a part of Kukiz'15, representing Kielce. He was then an independent lawmaker. In 2017 he founded a political association, Skuteczni. At the end of 2018 he joined the Propolish Coalition later renamed to Confederation KORWiN Braun Liroy Narodowcy.

He was the chairman of the parliamentary group on medical marijuana.

== Career ==
=== 1982–1994 ===
- 1982 – first experiences with rap music, first mixtape
- 1983 – first experiences as DJ and MC, first attempts as musician with rock bands
- 1984–1991 – first rap performances (streets and clubs), breakdancing
- 1991 – trip to France, with Polish-American group Leeroy & the Western Posse performances in European clubs
- August–September 1992 – recording of his first material released later as PM Cool Lee
- January 1993 – recording of his first TV appearance for Polish TVP2
- October 18, 1994 – signed a deal with BMG Poland

=== 1995 ===
- May 22, 1995 – release of mini album SCYZORYK with tracks "Scyzoryk", "Korrba" and "Coraz Daley od Rayoo"
- June 7, 1995 – release of video "Scyzoryk", track reaches most of top 10 of country playlists
- July 4, 1995 – Liroy gets standing ovation at Sopot during Marlboro Rock in Festival where he supports Ice-T and Body Count
- July 5, 1995 – Ice T calls Liroy OG of Poland at the press conference in Sopot. "He is cool. I like him" says Ice-T
- July 10, 1995 – Liroy's debut album titled ALBOOM containing hits "Scoobiedo Ya" and "Scyzoryk" is released;
- August 1995 – ALBOOM becomes gold – 100,000 copies sold in one month, and then another 100,000 copies sold by the end of the month
- September 1995 – Liroy is front-page news in serious weeklies and tabloids – Wroclaw is the first stop of Liroy's first tour around Poland – a sold-out tour of 40 gigs that lasts till October 15
- September 2, 1995 – 250,000 copies sold – ALBOOM becomes platinum
- September 15, 1995 – 300,000 copies sold in two months – ALBOOM is the fastest selling debut album in the history of the Polish music business
- September 16, 1995 – over 10,000 spectators applaud Liroy in his home town of Kielce
- November 27, 1995 – Liroy co-headlines a gig in Gdansk with Lordz of Brooklyn – next day Liroy and Lordz record a track in Liroy's studio in Gdynia
- December 1995 – ALBOOM sold over 400,000 copies

=== 1996–1999 ===
- February 5–6, 1996 – in London Liroy performs as rapper with his own Polish lyric on one track for the new recordings of Malcolm McLaren
- March 1996 – Liroy is awarded with a Fryderyk (Polish equivalent of a Grammy Award) for Alboom as best rap/hip-hop album in 1995
- April–June 1996 – finishing the second album in his own studio Def Noizz in Gdynia
- May 1996 – an article in the Detroit Free Press
- November 1996 – Liroy's mini-album titled BAFANGOO Part 1 (9 tracks, 40 minutes) is released
- January–May 1997 – working on the next album in his own studio Def Noizz in Gdynia
- February 1997 – BAFANGOO Part 1 becomes gold
- February 1997 – Liroy adapts an original music to Bertold Brecht's The Career of Arturo Ui for Polish TV (Liroy acts as well)
- June 1997 – Liroy's second full album tilled L is released (album contains the track "Mano a Mano" written especially for boxing champion Przemysław Saleta as his fight's introduction and the hit single "Skaczcie do góry" (Jump up))
- September 1997 – L becomes gold
- December 1997 – New Talent page for Liroy in Vibe
- April 1998 – Liroy is awarded a Fryderyk for L as best rap/hip-hop album in 1997
- January 1999 – Liroy is noticed in the Virgin Encyclopedia of Dance Music
- August 1999 – Liroy's third full album Dzien Szaka-L'a (The day of jacka-l) is released
- October 1999 – Dzien Szaka-L'a becomes gold

=== 2000–2007 ===
- January 2000 – Dzien Szaka-L'a is announced to be the second best sales result among all the local releases in Poland in 1999
- February 2000 – new thriller-comedy movie Chłopaki nie płaczą (Boys Don't Cry) with Liroy's score enters screens in Poland
- March 2000 – Dzien Szaka-L'a becomes platinum; Liroy is awarded with a Fryderyk for Dzien Szaka-L'a as best rap/hip-nop album in 1999 – Liroy's 4th Fryderyk award
- September 25, 2000 – Liroy's best of ... album titled 10 is released
- February 19. 2001 – re-edition of 10 is released. Includes remix of hit track "Scyzoryk" made by Jason Nevins.
- March 2001 – working on the next album in his own studio Def Noizz.
- September/October – recording sessions for the new LP to be called Bestseller – album includes artists: Ice-T, Lionel Richie, Prodigal Sunn, DJ Tomekk, and Da G.K.K.M.
- October 17, 2001 – Liroy's 1st Bestseller's SP called Hello – a ty czujesz to? is released. Track is featured by Lionel Richie.
- November 12, 2001 – Liroy's album Bestseller is released; Album becomes top 10 best selling album for few months. SP called Hello – czy ty czujesz to!' becomes one of the best playing songs in 2001/2002
- April 2002 – Liroy is nominated with Fryderyk (Polish equivalent of Grammy Award) for Bestseller as best Rap/Hip-hop album & Video of the Year in 2001.
- September 2002 – 1st studio session in New York. Start working on 3 parts CD called L Nino;
- July 2003 – Liroy is opening his own night club in Philadelphia (USA) called LIROYS
- September 2003 – Liroy managing and producing Eastern European Tour (or hip-hop icons PMD, DJ HONDA and K-SOLO;
- March 2004 – Liroy Bank Foundation is officially open. Foundation is a help for talented kids from the streets of Kielce city, Liroy's hometown;
- September 2004 – release of video Kiedys Przyjdzie Taki Dzien 1st single from forthcoming album;
- December 2004 – Liroy's new single track titled Kiedys Przyjdzie Taki Dzien is released;
- March 2005 – release of video (Kielce) My robimy To Tak ! 2nd single from forthcoming album;
- April 2005 – new single track titled (Kielce) My robimy To Tak ! is released;
- July–December 2005 – finishing the seventh album called L Nino cz.l / wstep in his own studio Def Noizz in Warsaw & touring
- Jan.-August 2006 – Liroy on tour all around Poland;
- Sept/November 2006 – finishing new LP called L Nino vol 1
- November 26, 2006 – Interview & live on stage at TVN program called Kuba Wojewódzki Show
- November 27, 2006 – Liroy's album L Nine vol 1 is released exclusively at Allegro.
- November 27, 2006 – madness starts – over 1000 CDs of L Nino vol 1 sold in 10 hours at Allegro, This is fastest selling CD in the history of Allegro.
- December 4, 2006 – officially release of L Nino vol.1
- December 5, 2006 – L Nino vol 1 becomes Gold.
- December 31, 2006 – video shoot of „ Ta Noc Jest za Krótka na Sen" at 6 different New Year's parties.
- January 4, 2007 – L Nino vol J release party at Warsaw club ZOO.
- February 2007 – release of video " Ta Noc Jest za Krotka na Sen"
- February 2007 – L Nino vol 1 becomes Platinum
- March 2007 – Liroy opening new street wear company called DEF Life.
- June 2007 – DEF Life's first collection in stores.
- June 2007 – project called DOM WARIATA (MAD HOUSE) is born.
- July/August 2007 – Ta Noc Jest za Krótka na Sen remix contest.
- September 2007 – interview at TVN program called Szymon Majewski Show
- September 2007 – recording 13 parts of SHIBUYA TV show for VIVA TV.
- Oct./November 2007 – working on the next album called Grandpaparapa (Powrót Króla)
- November 2007 – L Nino vol.l sold over 50,000 copies
- December 2007 – 25 year anniversary of Liroy's rap adventure
- December 9, 2007 – Liroy as a star of famous TVP2 show called Szansa na Sukces
- December 21, 2007 – Liroy's double album Grandpaparapa (Powrót Króla) is released exclusively and only at internet as a limited edition of 3000 copies.

== Discography ==
=== Studio albums ===
Title	Album details	Peak chart positions	Sales	Certifications
Title	Album details	POL	Sales	Certifications
East On Da Mic (as P.M. Cool Lee)	Released: 1992; Label: Starling	—		
Alboom	Released: July 10, 1995; Label: BMG Ariola Poland	—	POL: 500,000+	POL: 4× Platinum
L	Released: June 7, 1997; Label: BMG Ariola Poland	—	POL: 100,000+	POL: Gold
Dzień Szakala (Bafangoo Cz.2)	Released: August 5, 1999; Label: BMG Ariola Poland	—	POL: 100,000+	POL: Platinum
Bestseller	Released: November 19, 2001; Label: BMG Ariola Poland	6	POL: 50,000+	POL: Gold
L Niño vol. 1	Released: November 27, 2006; Label: DEF Entertainment	46		
"—" denotes a recording that did not chart or was not released in that territory.

=== Compilation albums ===
Title	Album details	Peak chart positions
Title	Album details	POL
10	Released: September 18, 2000; Label: BMG Ariola Poland	44
Grandpaparapa (Powrót króla)	Released: December 21, 2007; Label: DEF Entertainment	—
"—" denotes a recording that did not chart or was not released in that territory.

=== EPs ===
Title	EP details	Sales	Certifications
Bafangoo Cz.1	Data: March 11, 1996; Wydawca: BMG Ariola Poland	POL: 100,000+	POL: Gold
