= Piotr Radziszewski =

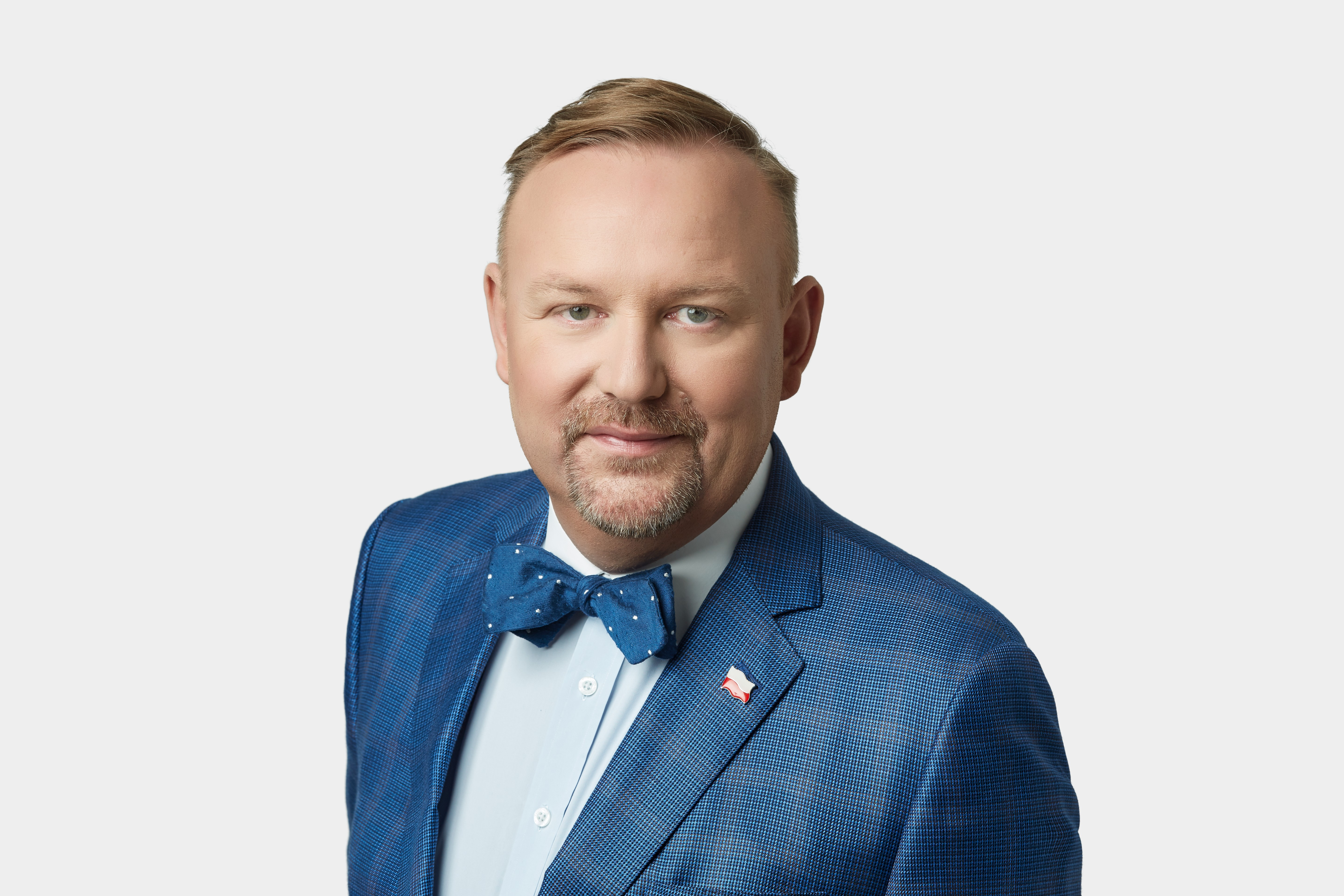
Prof. Piotr Radziszewski (urolog), 2019

Piotr Radziszewski (born January 1, 1970, in Pszczyna) is a Polish urologist, a professor of health sciences specializing in reconstructive urology, functional urology, urologic oncology, uro-gynecology and diseases of old age in men.

== Scientific career ==
In 1994 graduated First Faculty of Medicine in Medical University of Silesia in Katowice. In 1995 doctorate in anatomy urology based on the work “Innervation external urethral sphincter”. In 2007 received his PhD in medical sciences (urology). In 2011 he was awarded the title of professor of medical sciences.

Since 2004, a board member of the Section of Urology and Women’s Functional European Association of Urology (EAU). In 2007 became a member of the Guidelines Committee of Urology (EAU) and Scientific Committee of Polish Association of Urology Polskiego Towarzystwa Urologicznego (PTU). Since 2008 board member of Urodynamic School of International Continence Committee Międzynarodowego Towarzystwa Kontynencji (ICS) and member of theirs two institutions: educational and neuro-urology. Since 2009 member of Scientific Committee of EAU. In the same year he co-founded the Incontinence Society for Research Towarzystwo Badawcze n/t Inkontynencji (ICI-RS), which is an active member.

Since 2010 he became deputy director, and since 2012 head of the Department of Urology in Medical University of Warsaw Hospital Warszawskiego Uniwersytetu Medycznego. Reviewer in numerous of national and international journals (European Urology, Urogynecology, Urology Internationals, Videochirurgia) (European Urology, Urogynecology, Urologia Internationalis, Videochirurgia i in.). Member of editorial boards in many journals (Neurology Urodynamics, Central European Journal of Urology, Archives of Medicalsciences etc.).
