= Free and Solidary =

Political party in Poland

Free and Solidary Wolni i Solidarni
- Leader: Jan Miller
- Founder: Kornel Morawiecki
- Founded: November 2016
- Split from: Kukiz'15
- Ideology: Conservatism
- Political position: Right-wing
- National affiliation: United Right (2018-2019)

Free and Solidary (Polish: Wolni i Solidarni, WiS) was a small political party in Poland. Founder Kornel Morawiecki, the Senior Marshal of the Sejm, led the party until his death in 2019. The party was plagued with poor electoral performances, lack of agreements with other parties, and later legal troubles which led to a court-appointed curator disbanding the party in 2020. The party has been reactivated in late 2021.

== History ==
MPs of the party were initially elected from the lists of Kukiz'15, until an acrimonious split as WiS decided to align themselves with the United Right.

The party formally declared support for the economic and social policy of the Law and Justice (PiS) governments led by Prime Minister Beata Szydło and later her successor Mateusz Morawiecki. In December 2018, then-WiS Sejm Deputy Ireneusz Zyska crossed the floor to join the Law and Justice parliamentary club, followed by Adam Andruszkiewicz when he became Deputy Minister of Digital Affairs in Cabinet of Mateusz Morawiecki. On April 3, 2019, Sylwester Chruszcz also left WiS to join PiS.

During the 2019 Polish parliamentary election, it was announced that all three incumbent WiS deputies are seeking election on the PiS lists, with then-WiS leader Kornel Morawiecki standing as a candidate for the Senate in Constituency No. 59 (Białystok), while Jarosław Porwich (#15 on the PiS list in Constituency No. 8 (Zielona Góra)) and Małgorzata Zwiercan (#5 on the PiS list in Constituency No. 26 (Słupsk)) were seeking re-election to the Sejm; however, all three remained as members of the WiS parliamentary club and did not join the PiS group in the Sejm, due to the breakdown of negotiations between the two parties. Allegedly, the party's pro-Russian stance was a major source of contention.

With the passing of Morawiecki, he was replaced as the candidate for the Senate in Constituency No. 59 by a member of Law and Justice, and the party no longer has any registered party members standing for election on the PiS electoral committee lists. While the party's entire parliamentary club sought election on PiS list, four party members were candidates for Piotr Liroy-Marzec's "Effective" political party electoral committee (Polish: Skuteczni Piotra Liroya-Marca) in Constituency No. 35 (Olsztyn). The party performed very poorly in elections, worsened by a scandal that the party presented signatures of support from the deceased.

In February 2020, after long-standing legal problems, further exacerbated by the death of the leader in November 2019, a curator was finally appointed and the party was disbanded.

== Program ==
The party sets itself the goal of "rebuilding the Polish political system in the spirit of solidarity". It refers to freedom as "the freedom of multiple, responsible actions in the public space". It advocates for easing disputes in politics and increasing civic activity. Their policies include: education as a new form of paid work, a tax on large capital, economic self-government, term limits for local government authorities, remuneration for mothers raising children and building of railways for high-speed vacuum trains. The party also supports reform of the justice system, an efficient system of basic health care, increased spending on science and culture, cheap housing construction, as well as the development of employee ownership and domestic cooperatives and trade.
