= Janusz Sanocki =

Polish politician (1954–2020)

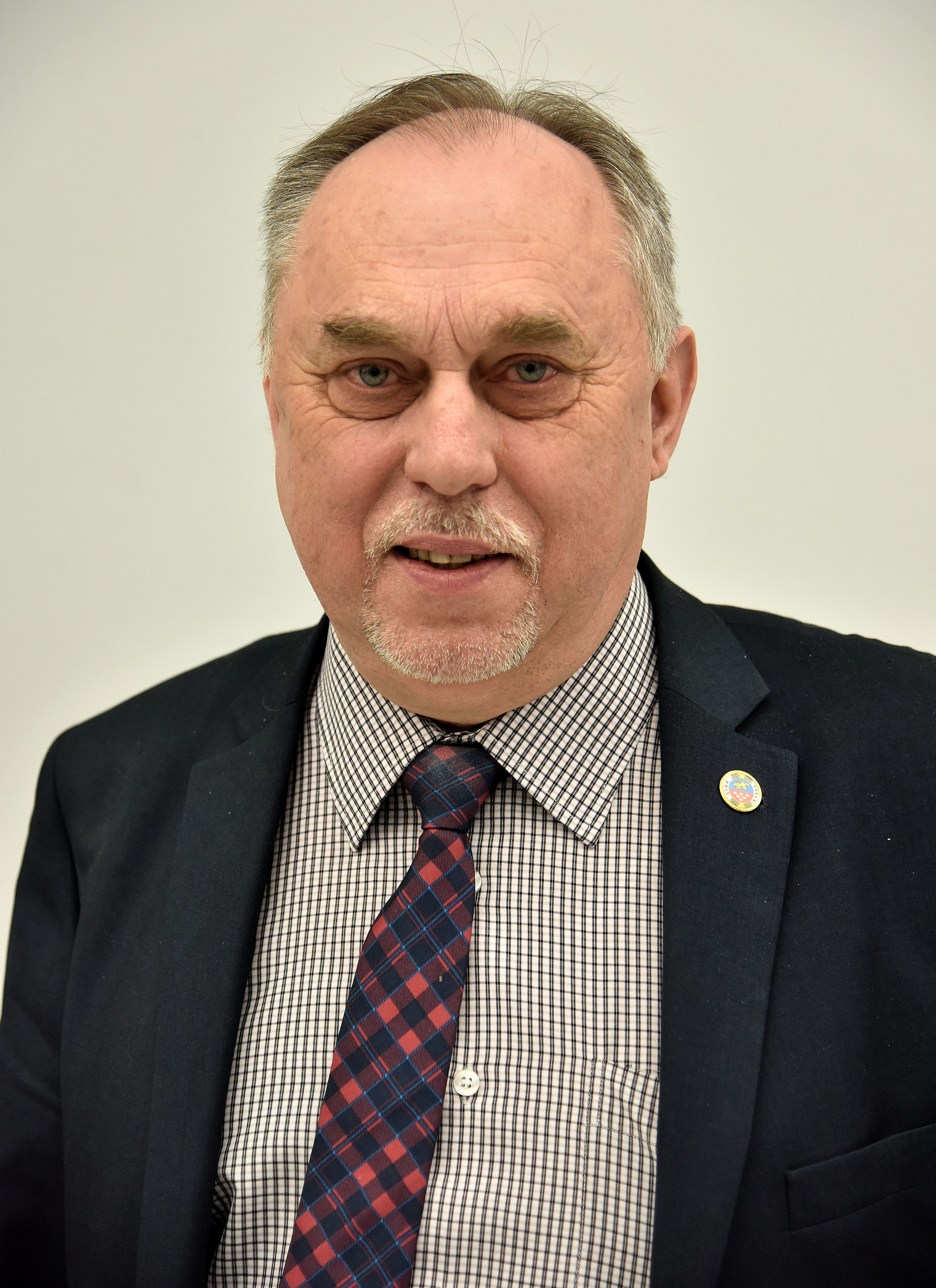
- Janusz Sanocki (2016)
- Born: 5 March 1954; Nysa, Poland
- Died: 7 December 2020 (aged 66); Kędzierzyn-Koźle, Poland
- Occupation: Polish politician

Janusz Sanocki (5 March 1954 – 7 December 2020) was a Polish politician.

Sanocki served as a member of the Sejm from 2015 to 2019 for Law and Justice. He died from COVID-19 during the COVID-19 pandemic in Poland.
