= Piotr Liroy-Marzec's Effective =

Piotr Liroy-Marzec's Effective Skuteczni Piotra Liroya-Marca
- Abbreviation: Skuteczni
- Leader: Piotr Liroy-Marzec
- Founder: Piotr Liroy-Marzec
- Founded: 28 February 2017
- Registered: 15 April 2019
- Split from: Kukiz'15
- Headquarters: ul. Domaniewska 47, 02-672 Warszawa
- Ideology: Classical liberalism Direct democracy E-democracy; Euroscepticism
- Political position: Right-wing
- National affiliation: Confederation (2019)
- Colours: White; Red
- Sejm: 0 / 460
- Senate: 0 / 100

Website
- skuteczni.org

The Piotr Liroy-Marzec's Effective (Polish: Skuteczni Piotra Liroya-Marca), shortened to Effective (Polish: Skuteczni) is a Polish political group founded by Piotr Liroy-Marzec in 2017. Until 2019, Skuteczni only functioned as an association, registered in 2019 as a political party.

== History ==
The Effective Association was founded in February 2017 by Piotr Liroy-Marzec, then MP of the Kukiz'15 club (after he left the association associated with the movement). In June of the same year, the MP was expelled from the club. During the 2018 local elections, Skuteczni co-founded with the KORWiN party "KWW Wolność w Samorządzie", on behalf of which Piotr Liroy-Marzec ran for the president of Kielce, obtaining a result of 16% of votes and taking 3rd place in the elections. The vice-president of Skuteczni, Grzegorz Gajewski (Association Świętokrzyski Region, starting from KW) was elected the mayor of Opatów. On 22 November 2018 Piotr Liroy-Marzec, together with MPs Jacek Wilk and Jakub Kulesza (elected from the Kukiz '15 lists, representing KORWiN), co-founded the parliamentary group Wolność i Skuteczni (of which he became the chairman). In January, Skuteczni joined the election agreement for the 2019 European Parliament election, created by KORWiN, the National Movement and smaller circles. In February, it was named Confederation KORWiN Braun Liroy Narodowcy. In March 2019, the parliamentary group Wolność i Skuteczni (Liberty & Effective) was transformed into the Confederation parliamentary group (whose chairman was Jacek Wilk). In the elections to the European Parliament, Piotr Liroy-Marzec opened the Confederation's electoral list in the Greater Poland region, but the committee did not win seats.

On 15 April 2019 the party Skuteczni was registered. In June, together with the Federation for the Republic of Poland led by MP Marek Jakubiak, Skuteczni announced that they would leave the Confederation and establish a joint party, Federation Jakubiak-Liroy, which ultimately did not take place. On 9 August Piotr Liroy-Marzec, together with Jerzy Jachnik and Janusz Sanocki, co-founded the parliamentary group Restore Law. Skuteczni took part in the 2019 parliamentary election on their own. The start of their lists was announced, among others, by hitherto activists of Kukiz'15, KORWiN and Congress of the New Right, as well as the Party of Drivers (which eventually re-associated with the Confederation). The successful ones registered letters to the Sejm in five constituencies: Radom, Rzeszów, Białystok, Kielce and Olsztyn. Among the candidates there were, among others party leader Piotr Liroy-Marzec (leader of the Kielce list), Paweł Abramski (leader of the Olsztyn list, former KLD MP and AWS senator), Andrzej Szlęzak (leader of the Rzeszów list, voivodeship councilor of the Civic Coalition belonging to PSL, former president of Stalowa Wola), Paweł Połanecki (in the Kielce district, one of the leaders of the Unity of the Nation), or several Free and Solidary activists. KW Skuteczni won about 19 thousand in the elections to the Sejm. votes, which translated into 0.1% of the votes nationwide.

== Programme ==
The Effective Party adopted the following program recommendations for the 2019 parliamentary elections:

- introducing the possibility of individual standing in elections to the Sejm
- introducing mandatory national and local referendums without a turnout threshold
- increasing the income tax threshold to twelve times the minimum monthly salary
- introducing the possibility of electronic voting in elections
- introducing the institution of a justice of the peace
- introducing general elections to the National Council of the Judiciary
- maintaining the zloty as the Polish złoty
- maintaining the primacy of the Constitution of the Republic of Poland over EU law
- opposition to the establishment of a European army
