= Results breakdown of the 2023 Polish parliamentary election (Senate) =

Breakdown of election results

This is the results breakdown of the Senate election held in Poland on 15 October 2023. The following tables show detailed results in each constituency.

== Nationwide ==
Largest electoral alliance in each Senate constituency

Winning party in each Senate constituency

size
Party or alliance		Votes	%	Seats	+/–
Civic Coalition	Civic Platform	5,107,360	23.86	36	+2
Civic Coalition	Independents	1,079,935	5.05	5	−4
Civic Coalition	Total	6,187,295	28.91	41	−2
Third Way	Polish People's Party	1,282,952	5.99	4	+2
Third Way	Poland 2050 (Note: Includes 104,047 votes and 1 seat for supported independents.)	726,740	3.40	5	New
Third Way	Union of European Democrats	198,074	0.93	1	0
Third Way	Centre for Poland	177,158	0.83	1	New
Third Way	Independents	77,436	0.36	0	New
Third Way	Total	2,462,360	11.50	11	+8
The Left	New Left	659,650	3.08	5	+4
The Left	Left Together	294,150	1.37	2	New
The Left	Polish Socialist Party	59,980	0.28	1	0
The Left	Labour Union	55,372	0.26	1	+1
The Left	Independents	62,487	0.29	0	New
The Left	Total	1,131,639	5.29	9	+7
Senate Pact independents (Note: Wadim Tyszkiewicz, Krzysztof Kwiatkowski, Bogusław Waksmundzki, Krzystof Borkowski, Zygmunt Frankiewicz and Andrzej Dziuba ran as independents officially supported by the Senate Pact. Additionally Wadim Tyszkiewicz is a member of Yes! For Poland.)	Polish People's Party	40,002	0.19	0	New
Senate Pact independents	Independents	533,058	2.49	4	New
Senate Pact independents	Total	573,060	2.68	4	New
Senate Pact 2023 total		10,354,354	48.38	65	+17
United Right	Law and Justice	6,352,852	29.68	29	−9
United Right	Sovereign Poland	131,649	0.62	1	−1
United Right	The Republicans	64,020	0.30	0	New
United Right	Independents	901,354	4.21	4	−2
United Right	Total	7,449,875	34.81	34	−14
Confederation Liberty and Independence	National Movement	486,343	2.27	0	0
Confederation Liberty and Independence	New Hope	423,318	1.98	0	New
Confederation Liberty and Independence	Confederation of the Polish Crown	154,104	0.72	0	New
Confederation Liberty and Independence	Self-Defence	23,030	0.11	0	New
Confederation Liberty and Independence	Real Europe Movement – Europa Christi	19,594	0.09	0	New
Confederation Liberty and Independence	Right Wing of the Republic	13,396	0.06	0	New
Confederation Liberty and Independence	Confederation	12,429	0.06	0	New
Confederation Liberty and Independence	Independents	311,622	1.46	0	0
Confederation Liberty and Independence	Total	1,443,836	6.75	0	0
Bezpartyjni Samorządowcy	Bezpartyjni Samorządowcy	104,156	0.49	0	New
Bezpartyjni Samorządowcy	Law and Justice	77,594	0.36	0	New
Bezpartyjni Samorządowcy	In Common for Health	42,343	0.20	0	New
Bezpartyjni Samorządowcy	Agreement	17,620	0.08	0	New
Bezpartyjni Samorządowcy	Independents	808,206	3.78	0	0
Bezpartyjni Samorządowcy	Total	1,049,919	4.91	0	0
New Democracy - Yes	New Democracy - Yes	87,788	0.41	0	New
New Democracy - Yes	Independents	7,903	0.04	0	New
New Democracy - Yes	Total	95,691	0.45	0	New
Mirosław Piasecki; Candidate for Senator RP	Independents	58,102	0.27	0	0
There is One Poland	The Republicans	16,001	0.07	0	New
There is One Poland	Independents	39,417	0.18	0	New
There is One Poland	Total	55,418	0.26	0	New
Union of Christian Families	Union of Christian Families	16,419	0.08	0	New
Union of Christian Families	Independents	34,787	0.16	0	New
Union of Christian Families	Total	51,206	0.24	0	New
Silesians Together	Silesians Together	50,274	0.23	0	0
Free and Solidary	Free and Solidary	42,956	0.20	0	New
Civic Agreement	Independents	41,592	0.19	0	New
Polska 2050 (Note: Not related to Poland 2050 of Szymon Hołownia.)	Independents	30,763	0.14	0	New
German Minority; Electoral Committee	Regional. Minority with Majority	29,390	0.14	0	0
Polish Pirate Party	Independents	27,286	0.13	0	New
Slavic Union	Slavic Union	18,052	0.08	0	New
Slavic Union	Independents	7,750	0.04	0	0
Slavic Union	Total	25,802	0.12	0	0
Prosperity and Peace; Movement	Independents	20,672	0.10	0	New
Repair Poland Movement	Independents	15,236	0.07	0	New
United	Confederation	9,309	0.04	0	New
United	Confederation of the Polish Crown	4,113	0.02	0	New
United	Total	13,422	0.06	0	New
Wolnościowcy	Wolnościowcy	4,053	0.02	0	New
Normal Country	Self-Defence RP	2,177	0.01	0	0
Independents and other committees with a single candidate	Polish People's Party	53,627	0.25	0	0
Independents and other committees with a single candidate	Agreement	50,763	0.24	1	0
Independents and other committees with a single candidate	New Democracy - Yes	7,580	0.04	0	New
Independents and other committees with a single candidate	Independents	429,004	2.00	0	−3
Independents and other committees with a single candidate	Total	540,974	2.53	1	−3
Total		21,402,998	100.00	100	0
Valid votes		21,402,998	97.53		
Invalid/blank votes		541,886	2.47		
Total votes		21,944,884	100.00		
Registered voters/turnout		29,532,595	74.31		
Source: National Electoral Commission

== Constituencies ==
Third Way results compared to Polish Coalition 2019 results.

=== 1st constituency (Legnica I) ===
Candidate	Party	Votes	%	+/–
Waldemar Witkowski	The Left	55,372	39.36	New
Rafał Ślusarz	Law and Justice	45,644	32.45	–6.08
Kamil Barczyk	Nonpartisan Local Government Activists	39,654	28.19	+3.64
Total		140,670	100.00	–
The Left gain from Law and Justice				

=== 2nd constituency (Legnica II) ===
Candidate	Party	Votes	%	+/–
Marcin Zawiła	Civic Coalition	61,199	42.03	+3.28
Krzysztof Mróz	Law and Justice	44,522	30.57	−9.11
Damian Misztela	Independent	12,193	8.37	New
Marek Obrębalski	Nonpartisan Local Government Activists	11,464	7.87	New
Robert Pawelczyk	Polska 2050	9,170	6.30	New
Patryk Straus	New Democracy - Yes	7,071	4.86	New
Total		145,619	100.00	–
Civic Coalition gain from Law and Justice				

=== 3rd constituency (Legnica III) ===
Candidate	Party	Votes	%	+/–
Małgorzata Sekuła-Szmajdzińska	The Left	82,511	38.37	New
Dorota Czudowska	Law and Justice	78,066	36.30	−10.37
Tymoteusz Myrda	Nonpartisan Local Government Activists	33,068	15.38	−3.52
Krzysztof Jasiński	Confederation	21,402	9.95	New
Total		215,047	100.00	–
The Left gain from Law and Justice				

=== 4th constituency (Wałbrzych I) ===
Candidate	Party	Votes	%	+/–
Agnieszka Kołacz-Leszczyńska	Civic Coalition	94,659	58.68	+8.83
Renata Wierzbicka	Law and Justice	51,003	31.62	−5.11
Piotr Ludkowski	Confederation	15,652	9.70	New
Total		161,314	100.00	–
Civic Coalition hold				

=== 5th constituency (Wałbrzych II) ===
Candidate	Party	Votes	%	+/–
Aleksander Szwed	Law and Justice	56,101	35.77	−7.68
Paweł Gancarz	Third Way	55,593	35.45	New
Andrzej Dyszewski	Civic Agreement	27,568	17.58	New
Jan Pokrywka	Confederation	12,429	7.93	New
Sebastian Grzyb	Polska 2050	5,130	3.27	New
~~Marzanna Leszczyńska~~ (crossed out)	Nonpartisan Local Government Activists	4,712		
Total		156,821	100.00	–
Law and Justice hold				

=== 6th constituency (Wrocław I) ===
Candidate	Party	Votes	%	+/–
Kazimierz Ujazdowski	Third Way	177,158	48.64	New
Jarosław Obremski	Law and Justice	123,328	33.86	−7.93
Michał Rado	Nonpartisan Local Government Activists	63,766	17.51	+4.75
Total		364,252	100.00	–
Third Way gain from Civic Coalition				

=== 7th constituency (Wrocław II) ===
Candidate	Party	Votes	%	+/–
Grzegorz Schetyna	Civic Coalition	113,815	61.21	−8.00
Marcin Krzyżanowski	Law and Justice	41,614	22.38	−8.41
Gaja Tyralska	Nonpartisan Local Government Activists	30,503	16.41	New
Total		185,932	100.00	–
Civic Coalition hold				

=== 8th constituency (Wrocław III) ===
Candidate	Party	Votes	%	+/–
Barbara Zdrojewska	Civic Coalition	136,168	62.09	−3.55
Małgorzata Calińska-Mayer	Law and Justice	52,224	23.81	−10.55
Jerzy Michalak	Nonpartisan Local Government Activists	30,912	14.10	New
Total		219,304	100.00	–
Civic Coalition hold				

=== 9th constituency (Bydgoszcz I) ===
Candidate	Party	Votes	%	+/–
Andrzej Kobiak	Civic Coalition	191,824	58.31	+5.65
Radosław Kempinski	Law and Justice	94,445	28.71	−5.52
Krystyna Jarocka	Confederation	42,710	12.98	−0.12
Total		328,979	100.00	–
Civic Coalition hold				

=== 10th constituency (Bydgoszcz II) ===
Candidate	Party	Votes	%	+/–
Ryszard Brejza	Civic Coalition	90,083	44.06	−1.70
Mikołaj Bogdanowicz	Law and Justice	71,671	35.06	−5.94
Jarosław Latawiec	Confederation	14,848	7.26	−0.48
Łukasz Wegner	Independent	13,931	6.81	New
Sławomir Szeliga	Nonpartisan Local Government Activists	13,908	6.80	+1.31
Total		204,441	100.00	–
Civic Coalition hold				

=== 11th constituency (Toruń I) ===
Candidate	Party	Votes	%	+/–
Tomasz Lenz	Civic Coalition	128,755	66.98	+6.08
Maria Mazurkiewicz	Law and Justice	63,479	33.02	−6.08
Total		192,234	100.00	–
Civic Coalition hold				

=== 12th constituency (Toruń II) ===
Candidate	Party	Votes	%	+/–
Ryszard Bober	Third Way	82,726	51.00	+11.74
Józef Ramlau	Law and Justice	55,406	34.16	−3.27
Adam Rybiński	Confederation	16,333	10.07	New
Zbigniew Adamczyk	Slavic Union	7,750	4.78	−1.54
Total		162,215	100.00	–
Third Way hold				

=== 13th constituency (Toruń III) ===
Candidate	Party	Votes	%	+/–
Krzysztof Kukucki	The Left	82,899	46.05	+9.31
Józef Łyczak	Law and Justice	65,916	36.62	−3.54
Jakub Lisiecki	Confederation	17,480	9.71	New
Sławomir Skrodzki	Nonpartisan Local Government Activists	13,719	7.62	New
Total		180,014	100.00	–
The Left gain from Law and Justice				

=== 14th constituency (Lublin I) ===
Candidate	Party	Votes	%	+/–
Stanisław Gogacz	Law and Justice	118,844	52.82	−9.45
Jan Rajchel	Civic Coalition	72,008	32.01	+7.24
Artur Pietras	Confederation	34,133	15.17	New
Total		224,985	100.00	–
Law and Justice hold				

=== 15th constituency (Lublin II) ===
Candidate	Party	Votes	%	+/–
Grzegorz Czelej	Law and Justice	119,498	52.50	−7.77
Stanisław Mazur	The Left	71,994	31.63	New
Michał Wypych	Confederation	36,130	15.87	New
Total		227,622	100.00	–
Law and Justice hold				

=== 16th constituency (Lublin III) ===
Candidate	Party	Votes	%	+/–
Jacek Trela	Third Way	93,316	48.48	New
Lech Sprawka	Law and Justice	65,282	33.92	−8.71
Mirosław Piotrowski	Confederation	19,594	10.18	New
Marcin Nowak	Independent	7,580	3.94	New
Mieczysław Konarski	Repair Poland Movement	6,695	3.48	New
Total		192,467	100.00	–
Third Way gain from Civic Coalition				

=== 17th constituency (Chełm I) ===
Candidate	Party	Votes	%	+/–
Grzegorz Bierecki	Law and Justice	71,167	53.74	−5.32
Marek Sulima	Third Way	61,250	46.26	+5.32
Total		132,417	100.00	–
Law and Justice hold				

=== 18th constituency (Chełm II) ===
Candidate	Party	Votes	%	+/–
Józef Zając (Note: Józef Zając previously ran and won the seat under Law and Justice receiving 60.72% of the vote)	Independent	50,763	44.09	New
Kamila Grzywaczewska	Law and Justice	46,754	40.61	−20.11
Jolanta Duda	Confederation	17,623	15.31	New
Total		115,140	100.00	–
Independent gain from Law and Justice				

=== 19th constituency (Chełm III) ===
Candidate	Party	Votes	%	+/–
Jerzy Chróścikowski	Law and Justice	97,647	47.61	−15.40
Marek Lipiec	Civic Coalition	42,042	20.50	New
Arkadiusz Bratkowski	Independent	23,238	11.33	New
Dariusz Zagdański	Confederation	18,622	9.08	New
Rafał Kowalik	Nonpartisan Local Government Activists	15,654	7.63	New
Marek Poznański	New Democracy - Yes	7,903	3.85	New
Total		205,106	100.00	–
Law and Justice hold				

=== 20th constituency (Zielona Góra I) ===
Candidate	Party	Votes	%	+/–
Mirosław Różański	Third Way	104,047	59.15	New
Grzegorz Maćkowiak	Law and Justice	43,607	24.79	−8.78
Rafał Adamczak	Nonpartisan Local Government Activists	28,256	16.06	New
Total		175,910	100.00	–
Third Way gain from Civic Coalition				

=== 21st constituency (Zielona Góra II) ===
Candidate	Party	Votes	%	+/–
Władysław Komarnicki	Civic Coalition	108,863	58.14	+15.92
Tomasz Jaskuła	Nonpartisan Local Government Activists	78,379	41.86	New
Total		187,242	100.00	–
Civic Coalition hold				

=== 22nd constituency (Zielona Góra III) ===
Candidate	Party	Votes	%	+/–
Wadim Tyszkiewicz	Senate Pact independent	97,636	67.95	+16.05
Tomasz Kłosowski	Law and Justice	46,060	32.05	+0.55
Total		143,696	100.00	–
Senate Pact independent hold				

=== 23th constituency (Łódź I) ===
Candidate	Party	Votes	%	+/–
Artur Dunin	Civic Coalition	155,496	71.81	+4.64
Jan Tomaszewski	Law and Justice	61,049	28.19	−4.64
Total		216,545	100.00	–
Civic Coalition hold				

=== 24th constituency (Łódź II) ===
Candidate	Party	Votes	%	+/–
Krzysztof Kwiatkowski	Senate Pact independent	139,689	59.90	+21.81
Piotr Adamczyk	Law and Justice	68,741	29.48	−6.00
Bogusław Ciupka	Confederation	24,780	10.63	New
Total		233,210	100.00	–
Senate Pact independent hold				

=== 25th constituency (Sieradz I) ===
Candidate	Party	Votes	%	+/–
Przemysław Błaszczyk	Law and Justice	67,405	46.84	−10.85
Tadeusz Gajda	Third Way	49,191	34.18	New
Kamil Sobol	Confederation	14,230	9.89	New
Radosław Gajda	Nonpartisan Local Government Activists	9,814	6.82	New
Dariusz Pigłowski (Note: Dariusz Pigłowski previously ran under Restore the Law receiving 9.86% of the vote)	Repair Poland Movement	3,260	2.27	New
Total		143,900	100.00	–
Law and Justice hold				

=== 26th constituency (Sieradz II) ===
Candidate	Party	Votes	%	+/–
Marcin Karpiński	The Left	98,107	50.14	New
Maciej Łuczak	Law and Justice	67,775	34.64	−7.18
Klaudia Domagała	Confederation	29,777	15.22	New
Total		195,659	100.00	–
The Left gain from Law and Justice				

=== 27th constituency (Sieradz III) ===
Candidate	Party	Votes	%	+/–
Michał Seweryński	Law and Justice	87,381	45.47	−6.73
Dorota Ryl	Civic Coalition	77,209	40.18	+8.67
Robert Szymczak	Confederation	27,574	14.35	+3.15
Total		192,164	100.00	–
Law and Justice hold				

=== 28th constituency (Piotrków Trybunalski I) ===
Candidate	Party	Votes	%	+/–
Wiesław Dobkowski	Law and Justice	87,843	41.04	−14.59
Marek Mazur	Third Way	74,636	34.87	+14.52
Marek Chrzanowski	Nonpartisan Local Government Activists	18,439	8.62	New
Marek Kwapisiewicz	Confederation	17,104	7.99	New
Małgorzata Janowska	There is One Poland	16,001	7.48	New
Total		214,023	100.00	–
Law and Justice hold				

=== 29th constituency (Piotrków Trybunalski II) ===
Candidate	Party	Votes	%	+/–
Rafał Ambrozik	Law and Justice	84,981	46.28	−6.50
Józef Matysiak	Third Way	55,557	30.26	New
Andrzej Fąk	Confederation	15,375	8.37	New
Rafał Skiba	Civic Agreement	14,024	7.64	New
Sylwester Kucharski	Nonpartisan Local Government Activists	13,689	7.45	New
Total		183,626	100.00	–
Law and Justice hold				

=== 30th constituency (Kraków I) ===
Candidate	Party	Votes	%	+/–
Andrzej Pająk	Law and Justice	152,526	41.94	−15.96
Krzysztof Klęczar	Third Way	146,423	40.26	New
Dawid Łukajczyk	Confederation	36,911	10.15	New
Zbigniew Burzyński	Free and Solidary	18,625	5.12	New
Piotr Graczyk	Prosperity and Peace Movement	9,166	2.52	New
Total		363,651	100.00	–
Law and Justice hold				

=== 31st constituency (Kraków II) ===
Candidate	Party	Votes	%	+/–
Marek Pęk	Law and Justice	112,571	43.93	−13.42
Grzegorz Małodobry	Civic Coalition	107,235	41.85	New
Wiesław Bator	Free and Solidary	20,063	7.83	New
Wojciech Ozdoba	New Democracy - Yes	16,357	6.38	New
Total		256,226	100.00	–
Law and Justice hold				

=== 32nd constituency (Kraków III) ===
Candidate	Party	Votes	%	+/–
Jerzy Fedorowicz	Civic Coalition	151,792	67.06	+7.51
Zbigniew Cichoń	Law and Justice	74,553	32.94	−7.51
Total		226,345	100.00	–
Civic Coalition hold				

=== 33rd constituency (Kraków IV) ===
Candidate	Party	Votes	%	+/–
Bogdan Klich	Civic Coalition	184,334	70.90	+16.24
Mateusz Małodziński	Law and Justice	75,642	29.10	−3.84
Total		259,976	100.00	–
Civic Coalition hold				

=== 34th constituency (Tarnów I) ===
Candidate	Party	Votes	%	+/–
Włodzimierz Bernacki	Law and Justice	98,347	46.42	−9.19
Adam Korta	Civic Coalition	74,493	35.16	+12.80
Radosław Macoń	Confederation	22,378	10.56	New
Bartłomiej Krzych	There is One Poland	16,654	7.86	New
Total		211,872	100.00	–
Law and Justice hold				

=== 35th constituency (Tarnów II) ===
Candidate	Party	Votes	%	+/–
Kazimierz Wiatr	Law and Justice	89,582	47.12	−11.20
Stanisław Sorys	Third Way	56,849	29.90	+0.76
Józef Sztorc	Nonpartisan Local Government Activists	17,027	8.96	New
Mirosław Poświatowski	Confederation	15,694	8.25	−4.29
Dariusz Klich (Note: Grażyna Sztark previously ran under Confederation receiving 12.54% of the vote)	There is One Poland	10,979	5.77	New
Total		190,131	100.00	–
Law and Justice hold				

=== 36th constituency (Nowy Sącz I) ===
Candidate	Party	Votes	%	+/–
Jan Hamerski	Law and Justice	109,899	54.14	−11.21
Bogusław Waksmundzki	Candidate of the Mountain Land	57,297	28.22	+13.09
Krzysztof Chmura	Confederation	35,811	17.64	New
Total		203,007	100.00	–
Law and Justice hold				

=== 37th constituency (Nowy Sącz II) ===
Candidate	Party	Votes	%	+/–
Wiktor Durlak	Law and Justice	116,069	52.71	−7.62
Stanisław Pasoń	Third Way	60,700	27.57	New
Jarosław Jakubowski	Confederation	24,285	11.03	New
Beata Kalisz	Nonpartisan Local Government Activists	19,134	8.69	New
Total		220,188	100.00	–
Law and Justice hold				

=== 38th constituency (Płock I) ===
Candidate	Party	Votes	%	+/–
Waldemar Pawlak	Third Way	113,143	42.37	−5.22
Marek Martynowski	Law and Justice	107,267	40.17	−12.24
Adam Matyszewski	Confederation	23,828	8.92	New
Sylwester Osiński	Nonpartisan Local Government Activists	22,786	8.53	New
Total		267,024	100.00	–
Third Way gain from Law and Justice				

=== 39th constituency (Płock II) ===
Candidate	Party	Votes	%	+/–
Krzysztof Bieńkowski	Law and Justice	80,567	47.25	−10.77
Jan Maria Jackowski (Note: Jan Maria Jackowski previously ran and won the seat under Law and Justice receiving 58.02% of the vote)	Independent	71,404	41.88	New
Gabriel Janowski	Union of Christian Families	18,539	10.87	New
Total		170,510	100.00	–
Law and Justice hold				

=== 40th constituency (Warszawa I) ===
Candidate	Party	Votes	%	+/–
Jolanta Hibner	Civic Coalition	171,541	48.23	−3.29
Adam Lubiak	Law and Justice	119,929	33.72	−14.76
Urszula Krawczyk	Nonpartisan Local Government Activists	42,140	11.85	New
Robert Roguski	Independent	22,055	6.20	New
Total		355,665	100.00	–
Civic Coalition hold				

=== 41st constituency (Warszawa II) ===
Candidate	Party	Votes	%	+/–
Michał Kamiński	Third Way	198,074	53.44	−5.12
Barbara Socha	Law and Justice	108,830	29.36	−12.08
Paweł Walo	Confederation	34,945	9.43	New
Łukasz Malczyk	Nonpartisan Local Government Activists	28,821	7.78	New
Total		370,670	100.00	–
Third Way hold				

=== 42nd constituency (Warszawa III) ===
Candidate	Party	Votes	%	+/–
Marek Borowski	Civic Coalition	178,104	69.72	+5.17
Wojciech Zabłocki	Law and Justice	77,370	30.28	−5.17
Total		255,474	100.00	–
Civic Coalition hold				

=== 43rd constituency (Warszawa IV) ===
Candidate	Party	Votes	%	+/–
Małgorzata Kidawa-Błońska	Civic Coalition	231,122	74.70	+21.62
Alvin Gajadhur	Law and Justice	78,293	25.30	−2.08
Total		309,415	100.00	–
Civic Coalition hold				

=== 44th constituency (Warszawa V) ===
Candidate	Party	Votes	%	+/–
Adam Bodnar	Civic Coalition	628,442	76.47	+21.22
Alicja Żebrowska	Law and Justice	193,356	23.53	−5.87
Total		821,798	100.00	–
Civic Coalition hold				

==== Voters abroad and on ships ====
Candidate	Party	Votes	%	+/–
Adam Bodnar	Civic Coalition	432,505	78.01	+21.88
Alicja Żebrowska	Law and Justice	121,897	21.99	−6.78
Total		554,402	100.00	–
Source: Abroad On ships

=== 45th constituency (Warszawa VI) ===
Candidate	Party	Votes	%	+/–
Magdalena Biejat	The Left	204,934	72.40	New
Michał Grodzki	Law and Justice	78,128	27.60	−5.34
Total		283,062	100.00	–
The Left gain from Civic Coalition				

=== 46th constituency (Siedlce I) ===
Candidate	Party	Votes	%	+/–
Robert Mamątow	Law and Justice	89,104	43.09	−18.44
Grzegorz Nowosielski	Third Way	59,033	28.55	−9.92
Mirosław Augustyniak	Independent	30,389	14.70	New
Adam Kasjaniuk	Confederation	18,117	8.76	New
Bogusław Rogalski	Union of Christian Families	6,007	2.91	New
Zbigniew Dąbrowski	United	4,113	1.99	New
Total		206,763	100.00	–
Law and Justice hold				

=== 47th constituency (Siedlce II) ===
Candidate	Party	Votes	%	+/–
Maciej Górski	Law and Justice	96,148	51.11	−10.89
Zbigniew Widelski	Nonpartisan Local Government Activists	91,985	48.89	New
Total		188,133	100.00	–
Law and Justice hold				

=== 48th constituency (Siedlce III) ===
Candidate	Party	Votes	%	+/–
Waldemar Kraska	Law and Justice	69,725	51.57	−9.92
Krzysztof Borkowski	Senate Pact independent	40,002	29.59	New
Paweł Więckowski	Confederation	16,171	11.96	New
Paweł Wyrzykowski	United	9,309	6.88	New
Total		135,207	100.00	–
Law and Justice hold				

=== 49th constituency (Radom I) ===
Candidate	Party	Votes	%	+/–
Stanisław Karczewski	Law and Justice	71,115	51.78	−11.32
Leszek Przybytniak	Third Way	55,194	40.19	+3.29
Krzysztof Lechowski	Independent	11,039	8.04	New
Total		137,348	100.00	–
Law and Justice hold				

=== 50th constituency (Radom II) ===
Candidate	Party	Votes	%	+/–
Wojciech Skurkiewicz	Law and Justice	121,080	47.96	−9.49
Cezary Brymora	Third Way	89,569	35.48	New
Jarosław Dąbrowski	Confederation	22,429	8.88	−2.13
Jacek Nowak	Nonpartisan Local Government Activists	13,061	5.17	New
Beata Mnich	Independent	6,337	2.51	New
Total		252,476	100.00	–
Law and Justice hold				

=== 51st constituency (Opole I) ===
Candidate	Party	Votes	%	+/–
Tadeusz Jarmuziewicz	Civic Coalition	88,689	46.76	New
Jerzy Czerwiński	Law and Justice	75,193	39.65	−5.89
Zbigniew Fabijaniak	Confederation	25,774	13.59	New
Total		189,656	100.00	–
Civic Coalition gain from Law and Justice				

=== 52nd constituency (Opole II) ===
Candidate	Party	Votes	%	+/–
Piotr Woźniak	The Left	68,452	52.29	New
Marcin Lorenc	Law and Justice	33,061	25.26	−3.18
Henryk Lakwa	German Minority	29,390	22.45	+5.42
Total		130,903	100.00	–
The Left gain from Civic Coalition				

=== 53rd constituency (Opole III) ===
Candidate	Party	Votes	%	+/–
Beniamin Godyla	Civic Coalition	78,843	50.40	+9.77
Grzegorz Peczkis	Law and Justice	48,132	30.77	−5.43
Herbert Czaja	Nonpartisan Local Government Activists	29,458	18.83	New
Total		156,433	100.00	–
Civic Coalition hold				

=== 54th constituency (Rzeszów I) ===
Candidate	Party	Votes	%	+/–
Janina Sagatowska	Law and Justice	89,961	53.49	−9.66
Paweł Bartoszek	Third Way	56,812	33.78	New
Artur Burak	Confederation	21,419	12.73	New
Total		168,192	100.00	–
Law and Justice hold				

=== 55th constituency (Rzeszów II) ===
Candidate	Party	Votes	%	+/–
Zdzisław Pupa	Law and Justice	139,782	57.66	−15.46
Marek Paprocki	The Left	62,487	25.77	New
Jacek Ćwięka	Confederation	40,174	16.57	New
Total		242,443	100.00	–
Law and Justice hold				

=== 56th constituency (Rzeszów III) ===
Candidate	Party	Votes	%	+/–
Józef Jodłowski	Law and Justice	109,935	42.53	−14.32
Jolanta Kaźmierczak	Civic Coalition	83,043	32.13	New
Krzysztof Gutowski	Independent	33,414	12.93	New
Krzysztof Mazur	Confederation	32,074	12.41	New
Total		258,466	100.00	–
Law and Justice hold				

=== 57th constituency (Krosno I) ===
Candidate	Party	Votes	%	+/–
Alicja Zając	Law and Justice	98,783	56.72	−8.77
Stanisław Szałajko	The Left	37,590	21.58	New
Janusz Serwiński	Confederation	20,172	11.58	New
Tomasz Legeny	Nonpartisan Local Government Activists	17,620	10.12	New
Total		174,165	100.00	–
Law and Justice hold				

=== 58th constituency (Krosno II) ===
Candidate	Party	Votes	%	+/–
Mieczysław Golba	Law and Justice	131,649	49.20	−15.55
Adam Woś	Civic Coalition	65,034	24.30	New
Włodzimierz Bodnar	Nonpartisan Local Government Activists	42,343	15.82	New
Dariusz Lasek	Confederation	23,475	8.77	New
Maria Drapak	Prosperity and Peace Movement	5,088	1.90	New
Total		267,589	100.00	–
Law and Justice hold				

=== 59th constituency (Białystok I) ===
Candidate	Party	Votes	%	+/–
Marek Komorowski	Law and Justice	108,827	48.25	−9.92
Cezary Cieślukowski	Third Way	86,699	38.44	+7.78
Adam Kiełczewski	Confederation	30,000	13.30	New
Total		225,526	100.00	–
Law and Justice hold				

=== 60th constituency (Białystok II) ===
Candidate	Party	Votes	%	+/–
Maciej Żywno	Third Way	139,531	49.58	New
Mariusz Gromko	Law and Justice	106,138	37.72	−6.18
Zbigniew Kasperczuk	Confederation	35,742	12.70	New
Total		281,411	100.00	–
Third Way gain from Law and Justice				

=== 61st constituency (Białystok III) ===
Candidate	Party	Votes	%	+/–
Anna Bogucka	Law and Justice	46,935	46.94	−9.59
Sławomir Snarski	Civic Coalition	38,980	38.98	+1.42
Bartosz Malewski	Confederation	14,084	14.08	New
Total		99,999	100.00	–
Law and Justice hold				

=== 62nd constituency (Słupsk I) ===
Candidate	Party	Votes	%	+/–
Kazimierz Kleina	Civic Coalition	143,653	57.84	−2.18
Samanta Nowińska	Law and Justice	72,598	29.23	−10.75
Krzystof Kropidłowski	Confederation	32,097	12.92	New
Total		248,348	100.00	–
Civic Coalition hold				

=== 63rd constituency (Słupsk II) ===
Candidate	Party	Votes	%	+/–
Anna Górska	The Left	89,216	38.17	New
Dariusz Drelich	Law and Justice	79,958	34.21	−6.98
Sławomir Butza	Confederation	32,448	13.88	New
Dariusz Męczykowski	Independent	32,092	13.73	New
Total		233,714	100.00	–
The Left gain from Civic Coalition				

=== 64th constituency (Słupsk III) ===
Candidate	Party	Votes	%	+/–
Sławomir Rybicki	Civic Coalition	142,131	73.16	+12.21
Danuta Białooka-Kostenecka	Law and Justice	52,156	26.84	−1.82
Total		194,287	100.00	–
Civic Coalition hold				

=== 65th constituency (Gdańsk I) ===
Candidate	Party	Votes	%	+/–
Bogdan Borusewicz	Civic Coalition	223,227	70.12	−0.33
Hubert Grzegorczyk	Law and Justice	67,823	21.31	−8.24
Artur Szostak	Polish Pirate Party	27,286	8.57	New
Total		318,336	100.00	–
Civic Coalition hold				

=== 66th constituency (Gdańsk II) ===
Candidate	Party	Votes	%	+/–
Ryszard Świlski	Civic Coalition	104,759	56.91	−0.39
Andrzej Kobylarz	Mirosław Piasecki Candidate for Senator RP	48,795	26.51	New
Dominik Mazur	Confederation	30,518	16.58	New
Total		184,072	100.00	–
Civic Coalition hold				

=== 67th constituency (Gdańsk III) ===
Candidate	Party	Votes	%	+/–
Leszek Czarnobaj	Civic Coalition	56,152	52.56	−8.36
Natalia Nitek-Płażyńska	Law and Justice	32,524	30.44	−8.64
Paweł Szajda	Nonpartisan Local Government Activists	9,093	8.51	New
Łukasz Kulecki	Confederation	9,071	8.49	New
Total		106,840	100.00	–
Civic Coalition hold				

=== 68th constituency (Częstochowa I) ===
Candidate	Party	Votes	%	+/–
Ryszard Majer	Law and Justice	73,331	36.07	−12.19
Krzysztof Smela	Civic Coalition	59,305	29.17	−3.60
Jarosław Lasecki	Independent	38,551	18.96	New
Monika Fajer	Confederation	20,529	10.10	New
Mariusz Spiechowicz	Nonpartisan Local Government Activists	11,608	5.71	−7.61
Total		203,324	100.00	–
Law and Justice hold				

=== 69th constituency (Częstochowa II) ===
Candidate	Party	Votes	%	+/–
Wojciech Konieczny	The Left	59,980	49.44	+5.69
Monika Pohorecka	Law and Justice	36,866	30.39	−8.60
Marcin Maranda	Nonpartisan Local Government Activists	13,055	10.76	−6.50
Małgorzata Bieńkowska	Confederation	11,406	9.40	New
Total		121,307	100.00	–
The Left hold				

=== 70th constituency (Katowice I) ===
Candidate	Party	Votes	%	+/–
Zygmunt Frankiewicz (Note: Zygmunt Frankiewicz previously ran and won the seat under Civic Coalition receiving 61.09% of the vote)	Senate Pact independent	157,302	67.78	New
Łukasz Chmielewski	Law and Justice	74,768	32.22	−6.69
Total		232,070	100.00	–
Senate Pact independent gain from Civic Coalition				

=== 71st constituency (Katowice II) ===
Candidate	Party	Votes	%	+/–
Halina Bieda	Civic Coalition	81,986	57.70	+0.51
Mariusz Wójtowicz	Independent	42,047	29.59	New
Stanisław Tymiński	Slavic Union	18,052	12.71	New
Total		142,085	100.00	–
Civic Coalition hold				

=== 72nd constituency (Bielsko-Biała I) ===
Candidate	Party	Votes	%	+/–
Henryk Siedlaczek	Civic Coalition	80,430	39.30	−6.65
Ewa Gawęda (Note: Ewa Gawęda previously ran and won the seat under Law and Justice receiving 54.05% of the vote)	Nonpartisan Local Government Activists	77,594	37.92	New
Konrad Makarewicz	Confederation	24,640	12.04	New
Adam Pustelnik	Silesians Together	21,981	10.74	New
Total		204,645	100.00	–
Civic Coalition gain from Law and Justice				

=== 73rd constituency (Bielsko-Biała II) ===
Candidate	Party	Votes	%	+/–
Piotr Masłowski	Third Way	69,713	40.86	New
Wojciech Piecha	Law and Justice	62,189	36.45	−9.73
Andrzej Fojcik	Confederation	22,264	13.05	New
Mirosław Małek	Polska 2050	16,463	9.65	New
Total		170,629	100.00	–
Third Way gain from Law and Justice				

=== 74th constituency (Katowice III) ===
Candidate	Party	Votes	%	+/–
Gabriela Morawska-Stanecka	Civic Coalition	100,480	47.75	+19.89
Danuta Sobczyk	Law and Justice	63,102	29.99	−8.36
Leon Swaczyna	Silesians Together	28,293	13.44	−0.60
Piotr Beck	Confederation	18,561	8.82	New
Total		210,436	100.00	–
Civic Coalition gain from Law and Justice				

=== 75th constituency (Katowice IV) ===
Candidate	Party	Votes	%	+/–
Andrzej Dziuba	Senate Pact independent	81,134	56.65	New
Piotr Czarnynoga	Law and Justice	45,886	32.04	−17.03
Mateusz Ożóg	Confederation	16,193	11.31	New
Total		143,213	100.00	–
Senate Pact independent gain from Civic Coalition				

=== 76th constituency (Katowice V) ===
Candidate	Party	Votes	%	+/–
Beata Małecka-Libera	Civic Coalition	113,692	52.37	+9.23
Arkadiusz Grabowski	Law and Justice	67,886	31.27	−7.00
Tomasz Szotowski	Nonpartisan Local Government Activists	18,054	8.32	−4.02
Krystian Żelazny	Confederation	17,454	8.04	New
Total		217,086	100.00	–
Civic Coalition hold				

=== 77th constituency (Katowice VI) ===
Candidate	Party	Votes	%	+/–
Joanna Sekuła	Civic Coalition	87,687	55.16	−4.44
Jacek Dudek	Law and Justice	47,651	29.98	−10.42
Piotr Hałasik	Nonpartisan Local Government Activists	23,631	14.87	New
Total		158,969	100.00	–
Civic Coalition hold				

=== 78th constituency (Bielsko-Biała III) ===
Candidate	Party	Votes	%	+/–
Agnieszka Gorgoń-Komor	Civic Coalition	127,604	49.45	−1.64
Jan Chrząszcz	Law and Justice	91,091	35.30	−13.61
Cezary Czapiga	Nonpartisan Local Government Activists	28,960	11.22	New
Monika Socha-Czyż	Union of Christian Families	10,412	4.03	New
Total		258,067	100.00	–
Civic Coalition hold				

=== 79th constituency (Bielsko-Biała IV) ===
Candidate	Party	Votes	%	+/–
Andrzej Kalata	Law and Justice	73,276	39.59	−9.57
Konrad Gołota	The Left	63,449	34.28	New
Beata Macura	Nonpartisan Local Government Activists	24,620	13.30	New
Daniel Flaka	Confederation	23,754	12.83	New
Total		185,099	100.00	–
Law and Justice hold				

=== 80th constituency (Katowice VII) ===
Candidate	Party	Votes	%	+/–
Maciej Kopiec	The Left	86,070	51.50	New
Leszek Piechota	Law and Justice	45,420	27.18	−10.67
Jerzy Markowski	Independent	35,643	21.33	New
Total		167,133	100.00	–
The Left gain from Civic Coalition				

=== 81st constituency (Kielce I) ===
Candidate	Party	Votes	%	+/–
Jacek Włosowicz	Law and Justice	110,365	49.01	−15.08
Edmund Kaczmarek	Third Way	76,293	33.88	−2.03
Sławomir Szarek	Confederation	18,929	8.41	New
Jakub Kosiń	Nonpartisan Local Government Activists	15,701	6.97	New
Jerzy Kułaga	Union of Christian Families	3,916	1.74	New
Total		225,204	100.00	–
Law and Justice hold				

=== 82nd constituency (Kielce II) ===
Candidate	Party	Votes	%	+/–
Jarosław Rusiecki	Law and Justice	80,763	39.47	−9.83
Piotr Dasios	Third Way	60,403	29.52	New
Marek Materek	New Democracy - Yes	44,543	21.77	New
Michał Sokolnicki	Confederation	13,611	6.65	New
Elżbieta Komosa	Repair Poland Movement	5,281	2.58	New
Total		204,601	100.00	–
Law and Justice hold				

=== 83rd constituency (Kielce III) ===
Candidate	Party	Votes	%	+/–
Krzysztof Słoń	Law and Justice	91,662	40.04	−9.29
Henryk Milcarz	The Left	68,578	29.96	New
Katarzyna Suchańska	Nonpartisan Local Government Activists	35,484	15.50	+8.21
Andrzej Rak	Confederation	15,365	6.71	New
Robert Biernacki	There is One Poland	11,784	5.15	New
Marcin Bugajski	Independent	6,047	2.64	−4.68
Total		228,920	100.00	–
Law and Justice hold				

=== 84th constituency (Elbląg I) ===
Candidate	Party	Votes	%	+/–
Jerzy Wcisła	Civic Coalition	86,158	57.04	+12.42
Łukasz Kochan	Law and Justice	52,550	34.79	−5.16
Justyna Masiewicz-Grodź	Union of Christian Families	12,332	8.16	New
Total		151,040	100.00	–
Civic Coalition hold				

=== 85th constituency (Elbląg II) ===
Candidate	Party	Votes	%	+/–
Gustaw Brzezin	Third Way	73,391	49.06	New
Bogusława Orzechowska	Law and Justice	52,770	35.28	−6.70
Michał Fiałkowski	Confederation	12,055	8.06	−0.24
Paweł Dulski	Nonpartisan Local Government Activists	7,322	4.89	−8.93
Tomasz Dąbrowski	Wolnościowcy	4,053	2.71	New
Total		149,591	100.00	–
Third Way gain from Law and Justice				

=== 86th constituency (Olsztyn I) ===
Candidate	Party	Votes	%	+/–
Ewa Kaliszuk	Civic Coalition	93,766	43.78	+18.78
Lidia Staroń	Independent	66,617	31.10	−28.36
Zbigniew Purpurowicz	Law and Justice	36,131	16.87	New
Janusz Prucnal	Confederation	13,396	6.25	New
Anna Orzechowska	Free and Solidary	4,268	1.99	New
Total		214,178	100.00	–
Civic Coalition gain from Independent				

=== 87th constituency (Olsztyn II) ===
Candidate	Party	Votes	%	+/–
Jolanta Piotrowska	Civic Coalition	78,072	43.25	+4.04
Małgorzata Kopiczko	Law and Justice	65,292	36.17	−5.88
Artur Zalewski	Confederation	20,153	11.16	New
Mariola Kobus	Nonpartisan Local Government Activists	16,992	9.41	New
Total		180,509	100.00	–
Civic Coalition gain from Law and Justice				

=== 88th constituency (Piła I) ===
Candidate	Party	Votes	%	+/–
Adam Szejnfeld	Civic Coalition	105,030	49.81	+6.17
Janusz Kubiak	Law and Justice	62,985	29.87	−8.96
Józef Kołos	Confederation	23,030	10.92	New
Justyna Przybył	New Democracy - Yes	19,817	9.40	New
Total		210,862	100.00	–
Civic Coalition hold				

=== 89th constituency (Piła II) ===
Candidate	Party	Votes	%	+/–
Jan Filip Libicki	Third Way	119,190	58.34	−4.70
Danuta Nijaka	Law and Justice	58,320	28.54	−8.42
Ryszard Oszmian	Confederation	26,809	13.12	New
Total		204,319	100.00	–
Third Way hold				

=== 90th constituency (Poznań I) ===
Candidate	Party	Votes	%	+/–
Waldy Dzikowski	Civic Coalition	190,681	75.07	+5.66
Dorota Barełkowska	Law and Justice	63,316	24.93	−5.66
Total		253,997	100.00	–
Civic Coalition hold				

=== 91th constituency (Poznań II) ===
Candidate	Party	Votes	%	+/–
Rafał Grupiński	Civic Coalition	255,036	77.64	+5.62
Ewa Jemielity	Law and Justice	73,467	22.36	−5.62
Total		328,503	100.00	–
Civic Coalition hold				

=== 92nd constituency (Konin I) ===
Candidate	Party	Votes	%	+/–
Grzegorz Fedorowicz	Third Way	111,128	49.93	New
Krzysztof Ostrowski	Law and Justice	72,468	32.56	−8.34
Michał Jurga	Confederation	23,259	10.45	+0.03
Mirosław Piasecki	Mirosław Piasecki Candidate for Senator RP	9,307	4.18	−2.79
Dawid Przybylski	Prosperity and Peace Movement	6,418	2.88	New
Total		222,580	100.00	–
Third Way gain from Civic Coalition				

=== 93rd constituency (Konin II) ===
Candidate	Party	Votes	%	+/–
Leszek Galemba	Law and Justice	87,454	44.06	−15.28
Anna Majda	Third Way	77,436	39.02	New
Barbara Bilska	Confederation	18,827	9.49	New
Krystian Krawczyk	Nonpartisan Local Government Activists	14,752	7.43	New
Total		198,469	100.00	–
Law and Justice hold				

=== 94th constituency (Kalisz I) ===
Candidate	Party	Votes	%	+/–
Wojciech Ziemniak	Civic Coalition	91,461	49.72	−1.63
Dorota Słowińska	Law and Justice	56,796	30.87	−8.54
Adam Gbiorczyk	Confederation	19,409	10.55	New
Sławomir Kryjom	Nonpartisan Local Government Activists	16,301	8.86	New
Total		183,967	100.00	–
Civic Coalition hold				

=== 95th constituency (Kalisz II) ===
Candidate	Party	Votes	%	+/–
Ewa Matecka	Civic Coalition	84,325	44.43	−6.30
Łukasz Mikołajczyk	Law and Justice	70,180	36.98	−12.29
Piotr Piechowiak	Confederation	19,201	10.12	New
Manuela Michalak	Nonpartisan Local Government Activists	16,068	8.47	New
Total		189,774	100.00	–
Civic Coalition hold				

=== 96th constituency (Kalisz III) ===
Candidate	Party	Votes	%	+/–
Janusz Pęcherz	Civic Coalition	69,512	40.64	−9.91
Andrzej Wojtyła	Law and Justice	64,020	37.43	−12.02
Arkadiusz Ratajczyk	Confederation	11,718	6.85	New
Urszula Janczar	Nonpartisan Local Government Activists	10,849	6.34	New
Dawid Borowiak	Independent	9,874	5.77	New
Grzegorz Sapiński	Independent	2,898	1.69	New
Zdzisław Jankowski	Normal Country	2,177	1.27	New
Total		171,048	100.00	–
Civic Coalition hold				

=== 97th constituency (Szczecin I) ===
Candidate	Party	Votes	%	+/–
Tomasz Grodzki	Civic Coalition	181,895	69.61	+4.04
Agnieszka Kurzawa	Law and Justice	79,425	30.39	−4.04
Total		261,320	100.00	–
Civic Coalition hold				

=== 98th constituency (Szczecin II) ===
Candidate	Party	Votes	%	+/–
Magdalena Kochan	Civic Coalition	176,969	62.90	+4.61
Halina Szymańska	Law and Justice	104,383	37.10	−4.61
Total		281,352	100.00	–
Civic Coalition hold				

=== 99th constituency (Koszalin I) ===
Candidate	Party	Votes	%	+/–
Janusz Gromek	Civic Coalition	91,840	55.58	+12.13
Barbara Aściukiewicz	Law and Justice	53,954	32.65	−3.48
Mariusz Nagórski	Confederation	19,432	11.76	New
Total		165,226	100.00	–
Civic Coalition hold				

=== 100th constituency (Koszalin II) ===
Candidate	Party	Votes	%	+/–
Stanisław Gawłowski (Note: Stanisław Gawłowski previously ran and won the seat as an independent receiving 33.67% of the vote)	Civic Coalition	66,976	42.50	New
Andrzej Jakubowski	Law and Justice	41,099	26.08	−7.35
Jan Kuriata	Independent	14,224	9.03	New
Iwona Maliszewska	Nonpartisan Local Government Activists	13,195	8.37	New
Marcin Sychowski	Confederation	11,468	7.28	New
Marek Łagocki	Independent	10,638	6.75	New
Total		157,600	100.00	–
Civic Coalition gain from Independent				
