= Politics of Poland =

- Coat of arms of Poland
- Polity type: Unitary parliamentary constitutional republic
- Constitution: Constitution of Poland (1997)
- Formation: 30 December 1989 (Third Polish Republic) 17 October 1997 (constitution went into force)

Legislative branch
- Name: Parliament
- Type: Bicameral
- Meeting place: Sejm and Senate Complex
- Upper house
- Name: Senate of Poland
- Presiding officer: Małgorzata Kidawa-Błońska
- Appointer: First-past-the-post
- Lower house
- Name: Sejm
- Presiding officer: Włodzimierz Czarzasty, Marshal of the Sejm
- Appointer: Open-list proportional representation in 41 constituencies (5% national election threshold)

Executive branch
- Head of state
- Title: President
- Currently: Karol Nawrocki
- Appointer: Direct popular vote, two-round system
- Head of government
- Title: Prime Minister
- Currently: Donald Tusk
- Appointer: Sejm
- Cabinet
- Name: Government of the Republic of Poland
- Current cabinet: Cabinet of Donald Tusk
- Leader: Prime Minister
- Deputy leader: Władysław Kosiniak-Kamysz, Deputy Prime Minister; Krzysztof Gawkowski, Deputy Prime Minister; Radosław Sikorski, Deputy Prime Minister
- Appointer: Sejm
- Headquarters: Sejm and Senate Complex
- Ministries: 21

Judicial branch
- Name: Judiciary of Poland
- Constitutional Tribunal
- Chief judge: Bogdan Święczkowski

The politics of Poland takes the form of a unitary parliamentary representative democratic republic, whereby the president is the head of state and the prime minister is the head of government.

Executive power is exercised, within the framework of a multi-party system, by the president and the Government, which consists of the Council of Ministers led by the prime minister. Its members are typically chosen from the majority party or coalition in the lower house of parliament (the Sejm), although exceptions to this rule are not uncommon. The government is formally announced by the president, and must pass a motion of confidence in the Sejm within two weeks.

Legislative power is vested in the two chambers of parliament, the Sejm and the Senate. Members of the Sejm are elected by proportional representation, with the provision that non-ethnic-minority parties must gain at least 5% of the national vote to enter the lower house. Currently five parties are represented. Parliamentary elections occur at least every four years.

The president, as the head of state, is the supreme commander of the Armed Forces, has the power to veto legislation passed by parliament, which may be overridden by a majority of three fifths, and can dissolve the parliament under certain conditions. Presidential elections occur every five years. When a majority of voters support the same candidate, that candidate is declared the winner, while when there is no majority, the top two candidates participate in a runoff election.

The political system is defined in the Polish Constitution, which also guarantees a wide range of individual freedoms. The judicial branch plays a minor role in politics, apart from the Constitutional Tribunal, which can annul laws that violate the freedoms guaranteed in the constitution.

== Executive branch ==
The prime minister proposes, the president appoints, and the Sejm approves the Council of Ministers (the cabinet). The president is elected by popular vote for a five-year term, while the prime minister and deputy prime ministers (if any) are appointed by the president and confirmed by the Sejm.

The Council of Ministers is responsible to the prime minister and the Sejm. The president, on behalf of the prime minister, appoints and dismisses ministers, and the Sejm can vote out ministers or the whole cabinet via a motion of no confidence. A motion to dismiss the whole cabinet must name a replacement candidate for prime minister.

Ministerial posts, except for the Minister of Justice and the Minister of National Defense, are not named in statutory law – the composition of the cabinet and competences of ministers are decided by the prime minister.

Main office holders
Office	Name	Party	Since
President	Karol Nawrocki	Independent (Law And Justice)	6 August 2025
Prime Minister	Donald Tusk	Civic Platform	13 December 2023

=== Head of state ===
The president is elected by terms; as head of state, supreme commander of the Armed Forces, and supreme representative of the Republic of Poland. The president has the right to veto legislation, although a veto may be overridden by the assembly with a three-fifths majority vote. The president, as representative of the state in foreign affairs, shall ratify and renounce international agreements, appoint and recall the plenipotentiary representatives of the Republic of Poland and shall cooperate with the prime minister and the appropriate minister in respect of foreign policy. As Supreme Commander of the Armed Forces, the president shall appoint the chief of the General Staff and commanders of branches of the Armed Forces.

The president may, regarding particular matters, convene the Cabinet Council, although it does not possess the competence of the Council of Ministers. Official acts of the president shall require, for their validity, the signature of the prime minister, nevertheless this does not apply to:

1. nominating and appointing the prime minister
2. shortening of the term of office of the Sejm in the instances specified in the Constitution
3. introducing legislation
4. requesting the Sejm to appoint the president of the National Bank of Poland
5. appointing judges
6. proclaiming the holding of a nationwide referendum (a consent of the Senate is required)
7. signing or refusing to sign a bill
8. appointing the first president of the Supreme Court, president of the Constitutional Tribunal, members of the Council for Monetary Policy, appointing and dismissing members of the National Security Council
9. exercising the power of pardon
10. convening the Cabinet Council

== Legislative branch ==
Main office-holders
Office	Name	Party	Since
Marshal of the Senate	Małgorzata Kidawa-Błońska	Civic Platform	13 November 2023
Marshal of the Sejm	Włodzimierz Czarzasty	New Left	18 November 2025

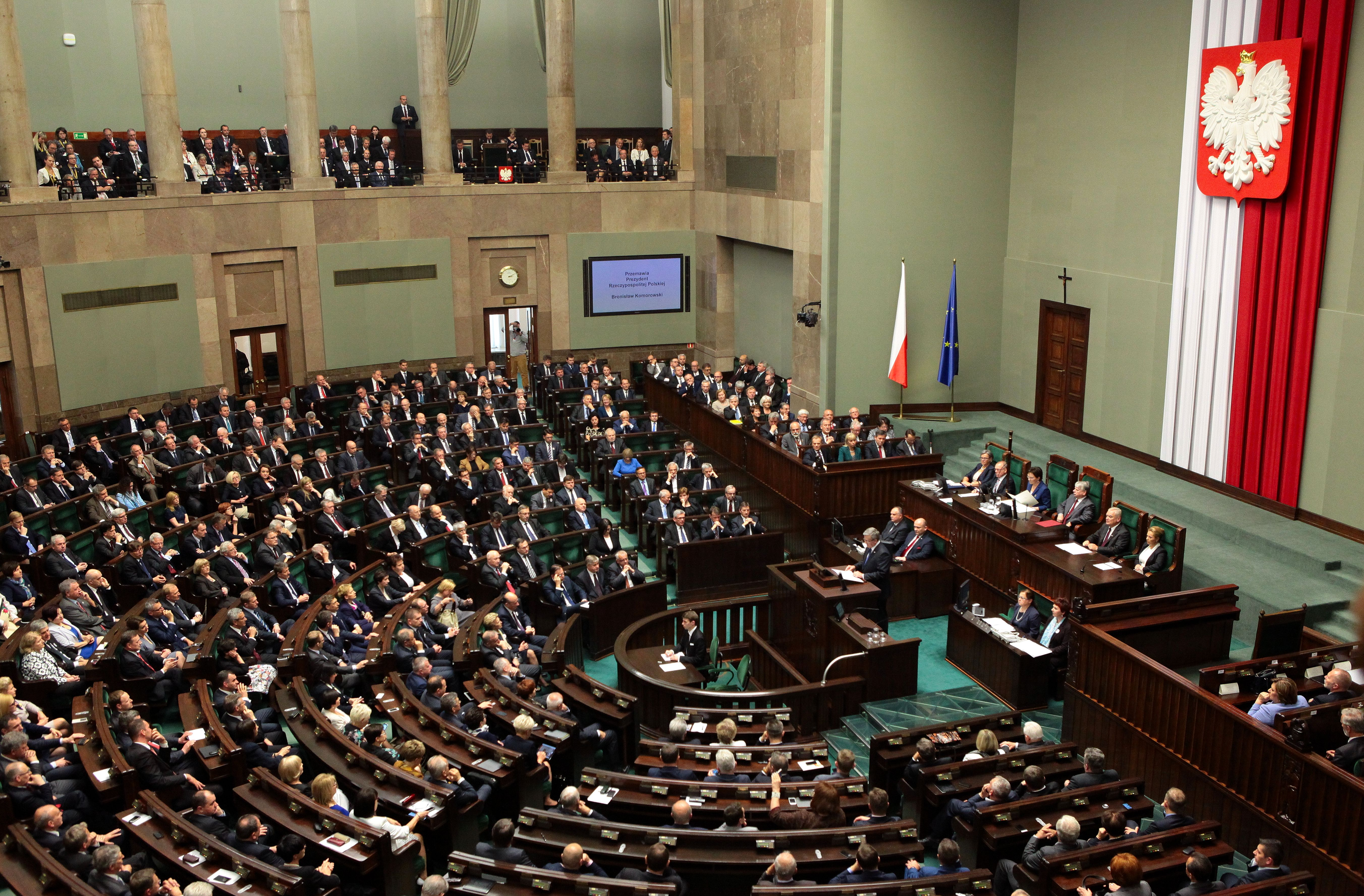
Sejm Plenary Hall

The Polish Parliament has two chambers. The lower chamber (Sejm) has 460 members, elected for a four-year term by proportional representation in multi-seat constituencies using the d'Hondt method similar to that used in many parliamentary political systems, with a 5% threshold (8% for coalitions, threshold waived for national minorities). The Senate (Senat) has 100 members elected for a four-year term under the single member, one-round first-past-the-post voting method. When sitting in joint session, members of the Sejm and Senate form the National Assembly, (Polish Zgromadzenie Narodowe).

The National Assembly is formed on three occasions: Taking the oath of office by a new president, bringing an indictment against the president of the republic to the Tribunal of State, and declaration of a President's permanent incapacity to exercise their duties due to the state of their health. Only the first kind has occurred to date. Since 1991 elections are supervised by the National Electoral Commission (Państwowa Komisja Wyborcza), whose administrative division is called the National Electoral Office (Krajowe Biuro Wyborcze).

== Judicial branch ==
=== Justice ===
Together with the tribunals, courts form part of the judiciary in Poland. Among the bodies that administer the justice system, the following are distinguished:

- Supreme Court;
- Common courts;
- Administrative courts;
- Military courts.

Moreover, in times of war, the Constitution allows for the establishment of extraordinary courts or the establishment of an ad hoc procedure. Court proceedings have at least two instances. The main laws regulating the operation of the judiciary are:

- The Act of 27 July 2001 - Law on the System of Common Courts;
- The Act of July 25, 2002 - Law on the System of Administrative Courts;
- The Act of August 21, 1997 - Law on the System of Military Courts;
- The Act of 23 November 2002 on the Supreme Court;
- The Act of 27 July 2001 on the National Council of the Judiciary.

=== Judges ===
Judges are appointed by the president, at the request of the National Council of the Judiciary, for an indefinite period. They cannot belong to political parties or trade unions, are independent, and are subject only to the Constitution and statutes. They are entitled to immunity and personal inviolability. Judges are also irremovable and their removal from office or suspension requires a court decision. The participation of other citizens in the administration of justice is defined by law and boils down to the application of the system of a lay judge in the first instance in common and military courts.

=== Supreme Court ===
The Supreme Court (Sąd Najwyższy) is a supervisory body over common and military courts. It is headed by the first president of the Supreme Court, appointed for a six-year term by the president of the Republic of Poland, from among candidates presented by the General Assembly of the Supreme Court of Justice. Until 2018, the court was divided into four chambers: Civil, Criminal, Military and Labour, Social Security and Public Affairs. Since 2018, there are chambers: Civil, Criminal, Labour and Social Security, Extraordinary Control and Public Affairs, and Disciplinary. Apart from the General Assembly, the second body of judicial self-government is the College of the Supreme Court.

=== Common judiciary ===
The common judiciary has three tiers. Its structure consists of district, regional and appellate courts. Common courts rule on criminal, civil, labor, economic and family law. Until 2001, there were also misdemeanor colleges, but the Constitution abolished their functioning.

=== Military judiciary ===
Military courts are criminal courts, ruling primarily on crimes committed by soldiers on active military service. The structure of the military judiciary is made up of garrison courts and military district courts. The Criminal Chamber (until 2018, including the Military Chamber) of the Supreme Court acts as the second instance or court of cassation.

=== Administrative judiciary ===
Administrative judiciary already existed in the Second Polish Republic, but it was abolished after World War II. Its gradual restoration began in 1980 with the creation of the Supreme Administrative Court (Naczelny Sąd Administracyjny). The current Constitution introduced the principle of two-instance procedures, which resulted in the establishment of voivodeship administrative courts adjudicating in the first instance. Administrative courts control the legality of administrative decisions, both against the governmental and self-governmental authorities. The president of the Supreme Administrative Court is appointed by the president for a six-year term, from among the candidates nominated by the General Assembly of Judges of the Supreme Administrative Court.

=== National Council of the Judiciary ===
The National Council of the Judiciary (KRS, Krajowa Rada Sądownictwa) is a body established to protect the independence of courts and judges. It submits applications to the president to appoint judges and has the right to apply to the Constitutional Tribunal in matters relating to the compliance of normative acts with the Constitution in the area relating to the judiciary. The National Council of the Judiciary consists of: the first president of the Supreme Court, the minister of justice, the president of the Supreme Administrative Court, a person appointed by the president, 15 judges of the Supreme Court, common, administrative and military courts, four deputies and two senators. The term of office of elected members is four years. The chairman and two of his deputies are elected from among the members of the Council.

=== Tribunals ===
Poland's legal system includes two major types of tribunals:

Constitutional Tribunals

Established in December 1985, the Constitutional Tribunal consists of 15 judges chosen individually by the Sejm for terms of 9 years. The Constitutional Tribunal (Polish: Trybunał Konstytucyjny [trɘˈbu.naw kɔn.stɘ.tuˈt͡sɘj.nɘ]) is the constitutional court of the Republic of Poland, a judicial body established to resolve disputes on the constitutionality of the activities of state institutions; its main task is to supervise the compliance of statutory law with the Constitution of the Republic of Poland.

State Tribunals

The State Tribunal (Polish: Trybunał Stanu [trɘˈbu.naw ˈsta.nu] ^{ⓘ}) of the Republic of Poland is a judicial body that rules on the constitutional liability of people holding the highest offices of state. It examines cases concerning the infringement of the Constitution and laws or crimes committed by the President, members of the government, the President of the Supreme Chamber of Control, the President of the National Bank of Poland, heads of central administrative offices and other senior state officials.

== Elections ==
Results of the Sejm election by powiats

2023 parliamentary elections

Party or alliance		Votes	%	Seats	+/–
United Right	Law and Justice	6,286,250	29.11	157	−30
United Right	Sovereign Poland	465,024	2.15	18	+8
United Right	The Republicans	99,373	0.46	4	+3
United Right	Kukiz'15 (Note: Kukiz'15 previously ran under Polish Coalition as independents. The result does not include Paweł Kukiz who is not a party member, but got elected with 43,292 votes.)	74,959	0.35	2	New
United Right	Independents	715,248	3.31	13	−8
United Right	Total	7,640,854	35.38	194	−41
Civic Coalition	Civic Platform	4,992,932	23.12	122	+20
Civic Coalition	Modern	375,776	1.74	6	−2
Civic Coalition	Polish Initiative	252,021	1.17	3	+1
Civic Coalition	The Greens	67,392	0.31	3	0
Civic Coalition	AGROunia	53,571	0.25	1	New
Civic Coalition	Good Movement	8,254	0.04	0	New
Civic Coalition	Independents	879,645	4.07	22	+3
Civic Coalition	Total	6,629,402	30.70	157	+23
Third Way	Poland 2050	1,561,542	7.23	33	New
Third Way	Polish People's Party	1,189,629	5.51	28	+9
Third Way	Centre for Poland	70,117	0.32	3	+3
Third Way	Union of European Democrats	21,056	0.10	0	−1
Third Way	Independents and others	268,326	1.24	1	−9
Third Way	Total	3,110,670	14.40	65	+35
The Left	New Left	1,199,503	5.55	19	−19
The Left	Left Together	453,730	2.10	7	+1
The Left	Independents and others	205,785	0.95	0	−5
The Left	Total	1,859,018	8.61	26	−23
Confederation	New Hope	551,901	2.56	6	+3
Confederation	Confederation (Note: Confederation was registered as a party to circumvent the 8% electoral threshold for electoral coalitions. Five of its elected members are part of National Movement, one of New Hope and one of Confederation of the Polish Crown.)	341,188	1.58	7	+4
Confederation	National Movement	199,149	0.92	0	−5
Confederation	Confederation of the Polish Crown	182,573	0.85	2	New
Confederation	Agreement (Note: Previously part of the United Right.)	3,568	0.02	0	−16
Confederation	Independents and others	268,985	1.25	3	+3
Confederation	Total	1,547,364	7.16	18	-9 (Note: Including the seats lost by Agreement.)
Nonpartisan Local Government Activists		401,054	1.86	0	0
There is One Poland		351,099	1.63	0	New
German Minority		25,778	0.12	0	−1
Peace and Prosperity Movement		24,850	0.12	0	New
Normal Country		4,606	0.02	0	New
Anti-party		1,156	0.01	0	New
Repair Poland Movement		823	0.00	0	New
Total		21,596,863	100.00	460	0
Valid votes		21,596,674	98.31		
Invalid/blank votes		370,217	1.69		
Total votes		21,966,891	100.00		
Registered voters/turnout		29,532,595	74.38		
Source: National Electoral Commission, National Electoral Commission

Results of the first round of the 2025 presidential election by powiats

Results of the second round of the 2025 presidential election by powiats

2025 presidential election

Candidate	Party	First round		Second round	
Candidate	Party	Votes	%	Votes	%
Rafał Trzaskowski	Civic Coalition (PO)	6,147,797	31.36	10,237,286	49.11
Karol Nawrocki	Independent (PiS)	5,790,804	29.54	10,606,877	50.89
Sławomir Mentzen	Confederation (New Hope)	2,902,448	14.81		
Grzegorz Braun	Polish Crown	1,242,917	6.34		
Szymon Hołownia	Third Way (Poland 2050)	978,901	4.99		
Adrian Zandberg	Partia Razem	952,832	4.86		
Magdalena Biejat	Independent (The Left)	829,361	4.23		
Krzysztof Stanowski	Independent	243,479	1.24		
Joanna Senyszyn	Independent (SLD)	214,198	1.09		
Marek Jakubiak	Free Republicans	150,698	0.77		
Artur Bartoszewicz	Independent	95,640	0.49		
Maciej Maciak	Independent (RDiP)	36,371	0.19		
Marek Woch	Bezpartyjni Samorządowcy	18,338	0.09		
Total		19,603,784	100.00	20,844,163	100.00
Valid votes		19,603,784	99.56	20,844,163	99.10
Invalid/blank votes		85,813	0.44	189,294	0.90
Total votes		19,689,597	100.00	21,033,457	100.00
Registered voters/turnout		29,252,340	67.31	29,363,722	71.63
Source: PKW Poland Elects

== Administrative divisions ==
Poland is divided in 16 provinces or Voivodeships (województwa, singular – województwo): Lower Silesia, Kuyavia-Pomerania, Łódzkie, Lubelskie, Lubuskie, Lesser Poland, Masovian, Opolskie, Subcarpathia, Podlaskie, Pomerania, Silesia, Świętokrzyskie, Warmia-Masuria, Greater Poland and West Pomerania.

== Policy ==
A 2025 opinion poll in Poland found the most common issues were health care access, security, political instability, and cost of living.

=== National security ===
Poland's top national security goal is to further integrate with NATO and other west European defense, economic, and political institutions via a modernization and reorganization of its military. Polish military doctrine reflects the same defense nature as its NATO partners.

The combined Polish army consists of ~164,000 active duty personnel and in addition 234,000 reserves. In 2009 the Armed Forces transformed into a fully professional organization and compulsory military service was abolished. Personnel levels and organization in the different branches are as follows (2004):

- Land Forces: 60,000 (4 divisions, independent units and territorial forces)
- Air Force: 26,000 (Air and Air Defense Corps)
- Navy: 14,300 (2 Fleets)
- Special Forces: 1,700 (4 Special Units – GROM, 1 PSK, "Formoza", special logistics Military Unit)

The Polish military continues to restructure and to modernize its equipment. The Polish Defense Ministry General Staff and the Land Forces staff have recently reorganized the latter into a NATO-compatible J/G-1 through J/G-6 structure. Budget constraints hamper such priority defense acquisitions as a multi-role fighter, improved communications systems, and an attack helicopter.

Poland continues to be a regional leader in support and participation in the NATO Partnership for Peace Program and has actively engaged most of its neighbors and other regional actors to build stable foundations for future European security arrangements. Poland continues its long record of strong support for United Nations peacekeeping operations; it maintaining a unit in Southern Lebanon (part of the United Nations Interim Force in Lebanon, a battalion in NATO's Kosovo Force (KFOR), and providing and actually deploying the KFOR strategic reserve to Kosovo. Poland is a strong ally of the US in Europe, and it led the Multinational Division Central-South in Iraq in the 2000s.

==== Government Protection Bureau ====
The State Protection Service (Polish: Służba Ochrony Państwa, SOP) is Poland's equivalent of the Secret Service in the United States, providing antiterrorism and VIP security detail services for the government.

=== Foreign relations ===
Poland wields considerable influence in Central and Eastern Europe and is a middle power in international affairs. The foreign policy of Poland is based on four basic commitments: to Atlantic co-operation, to European integration, to international development and to international law. Since the collapse of communism and its re-establishment as a democratic nation, Poland has extended its responsibilities and position in European and Western affairs, supporting and establishing friendly foreign relations with both the West and with numerous European countries.

Due to its historical experience with aggression of powerful neighbors (e.g., Partitions of Poland, Second World War), Polish foreign policy pursues close cooperation with a strong partner. At the same time, the equally burdened attitude towards Russia results in very tense diplomatic relations, which have been deteriorating since Vladimir Putin's rise to power. This is an important factor for the special attention Poland pays to the political emancipation of all its Eastern neighbors: Lithuania, Belarus, and Ukraine.

== See also ==
- Poland
- Politics of Europe
- Visegrád Group
- Hate speech laws in Poland
- Liberalism in Poland
- Polish government-in-exile
- Political parties in Poland
- Poland A and B
