= Results breakdown of the 2023 Polish parliamentary election (Sejm) =

Breakdown of election results

This is the results breakdown of the Sejm election held in Poland on 15 October 2023. The following tables show detailed results by each party in electoral coalitions, as well as constituency results.

== Nationwide ==
Results of the 2023 Polish parliamentary election by powiats

Results of the 2023 Polish parliamentary election by gminas

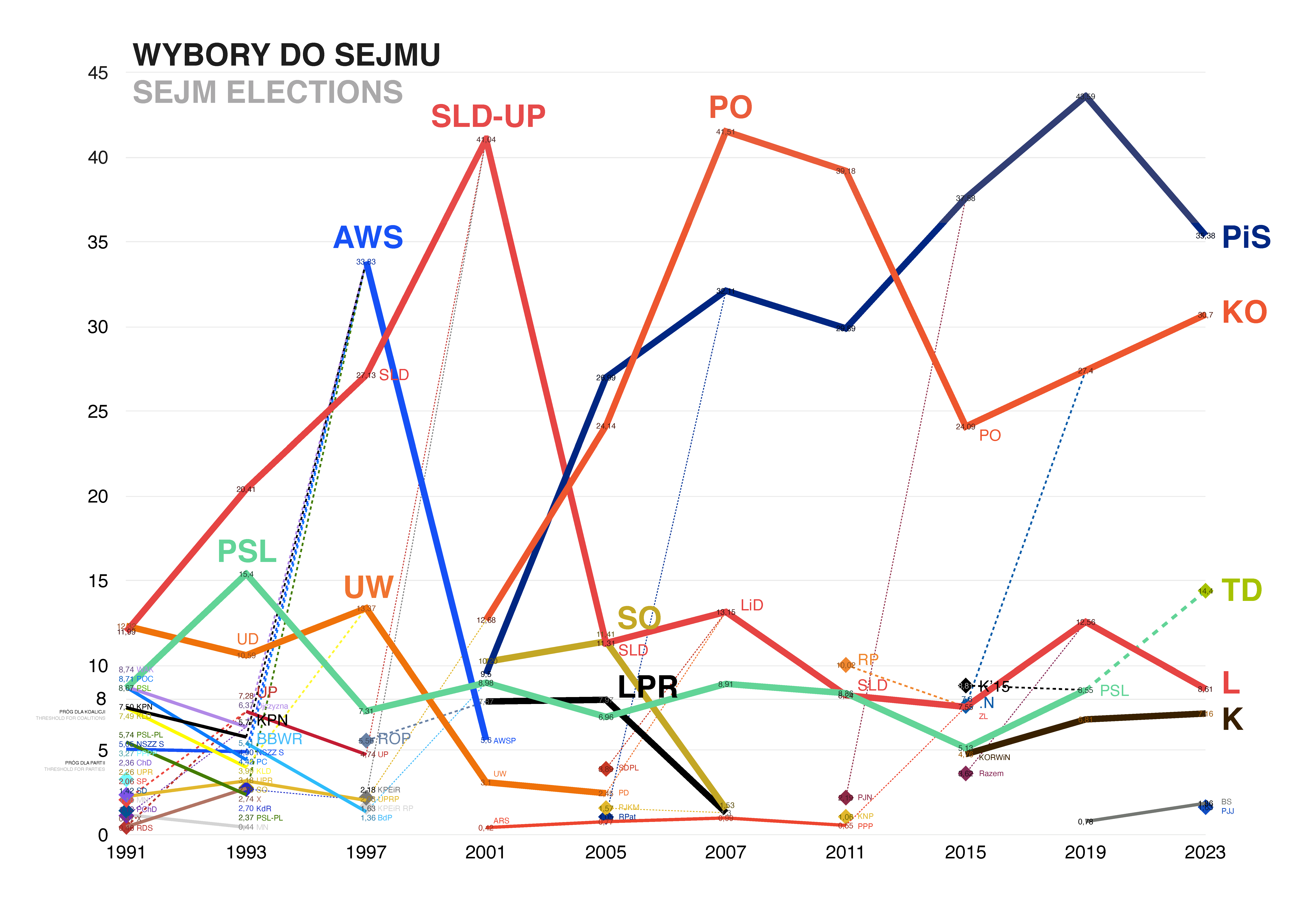
Results of Sejm elections 1991–2023

Party or alliance		Votes	%	Seats	+/–
United Right	Law and Justice	6,286,250	29.11	157	−30
United Right	Sovereign Poland	465,024	2.15	18	+8
United Right	The Republicans	99,373	0.46	4	+3
United Right	Kukiz'15 (Note: Kukiz'15 previously ran under Polish Coalition as independents. The result does not include Paweł Kukiz who is not a party member, but got elected with 43,292 votes.)	74,959	0.35	2	New
United Right	Independents	715,248	3.31	13	−8
United Right	Total	7,640,854	35.38	194	−41
Civic Coalition	Civic Platform	4,992,932	23.12	122	+20
Civic Coalition	Modern	375,776	1.74	6	−13
Civic Coalition	Polish Initiative	252,021	1.17	3	+1
Civic Coalition	The Greens	67,203	0.31	3	0
Civic Coalition	AGROunia	53,571	0.25	1	New
Civic Coalition	Good Movement	8,254	0.04	0	New
Civic Coalition	Independents	879,645	4.07	22	+14
Civic Coalition	Total	6,629,402	30.70	157	+23
Third Way	Poland 2050 (Note: Includes 233,917 votes and 2 seats for supported independents.)	1,561,542	7.23	33	New
Third Way	Polish People's Party (Note: Includes 23,051 votes and 1 seat for supported independents.)	1,189,629	5.51	28	+9
Third Way	Centre for Poland	70,117	0.32	3	New
Third Way	Union of European Democrats	21,056	0.10	0	−1
Third Way	Wolnościowcy	9,168	0.04	0	New
Third Way	Agreement*	1,039	0.00	0	New
Third Way	Independents	258,119	1.20	1	−9
Third Way	Total	3,110,670	14.40	65	+35
The Left	New Left	1,199,503	5.55	19	−19
The Left	Left Together	453,730	2.10	7	+1
The Left	Labour Union	11,495	0.05	0	0
The Left	Polish Socialist Party	5,273	0.02	0	0
The Left	Social Democracy of Poland	2,253	0.01	0	0
The Left	Freedom and Equality	475	0.00	0	0
The Left	Independents	186,289	0.86	0	−5
The Left	Total	1,859,018	8.61	26	−23
Confederation	New Hope	551,901	2.56	6	+3
Confederation	Confederation (Note: Confederation was registered as a party to circumvent the 8% electoral threshold for electoral coalitions. Five of its elected members are part of National Movement, one of New Hope and one of Confederation of the Polish Crown.)	341,188	1.58	7	+4
Confederation	National Movement	199,149	0.92	0	−5
Confederation	Confederation of the Polish Crown	182,573	0.85	2	New
Confederation	Wolnościowcy*	10,962	0.05	0	New
Confederation	Agreement	3,568	0.02	0	−16
Confederation	Real Europe Movement – Europa Christi	1,788	0.01	0	New
Confederation	Real Politics Union	527	0.00	0	New
Confederation	Crossed out	129	0.00	–	–
Confederation	Independents	255,579	1.18	3	+3
Confederation	Total	1,547,364	7.16	18	+7
Nonpartisan Local; Government Activists	Nonpartisan Local Government Activists	30,258	0.14	0	New
Nonpartisan Local; Government Activists	Responsibility	2,617	0.01	0	New
Nonpartisan Local; Government Activists	Law and Justice*	1,801	0.01	0	0
Nonpartisan Local; Government Activists	Fourth Polish Republic	488	0.00	0	New
Nonpartisan Local; Government Activists	Civic Platform*	377	0.00	0	New
Nonpartisan Local; Government Activists	Social Interest	292	0.00	0	New
Nonpartisan Local; Government Activists	Good Movement*	279	0.00	0	New
Nonpartisan Local; Government Activists	Federation for the Republic	229	0.00	0	New
Nonpartisan Local; Government Activists	Agreement*	219	0.00	0	0
Nonpartisan Local; Government Activists	Polish People's Party*	110	0.00	0	0
Nonpartisan Local; Government Activists	Crossed out	2,439	0.01	–	–
Nonpartisan Local; Government Activists	Independents	361,945	1.68	0	0
Nonpartisan Local; Government Activists	Total	401,054	1.86	0	0
There is One Poland	There is One Poland	195,599	0.91	0	New
There is One Poland	Polish People's Party*	153	0.00	0	New
There is One Poland	Independents	155,347	0.72	0	New
There is One Poland	Total	351,099	1.63	0	New
German Minority	Regional. Minority with Majority	17,282	0.08	0	−1
German Minority	Independents	8,496	0.04	0	0
German Minority	Total	25,778	0.12	0	−1
Prosperity and Peace; Movement	Independents	24,850	0.12	0	New
Prosperity and Peace; Movement	Total	24,850	0.12	0	New
Normal Country	Normal Country	684	0.00	0	New
Normal Country	Front	500	0.00	0	New
Normal Country	Independents	3,422	0.02	0	New
Normal Country	Total	4,606	0.02	0	New
Anti-party	Anti-party	1,156	0.01	0	New
Anti-party	Total	1,156	0.01	0	New
Repair Poland; Movement	Repair Poland Movement	57	0.00	0	New
Repair Poland; Movement	Independents	766	0.00	0	New
Repair Poland; Movement	Total	823	0.00	0	New
Total		21,596,674	100.00	460	0
Valid votes		21,596,674	98.31		
Invalid/blank votes		370,217	1.69		
Total votes		21,966,891	100.00		
Registered voters/turnout		29,532,595	74.38		
Source: National Electoral Commission, National Electoral Commission

* – individual members running on lists different from their own parties

== Constituencies ==
Third Way results compared to Polish Coalition 2019 results.

=== 1st constituency (Legnica) ===
Party	Votes	%	+/–	Seats	+/–
Law and Justice	174,643	34.80	−7.60	5	−1
Civic Coalition	169,540	33.78	+8.76	5	+2
Third Way	53,958	10.75	+3.58	1	0
The Left	47,715	9.51	−6.93	1	−1
Confederation	31,770	6.33	+0.48	0	0
Nonpartisan Local Government Activists	16,748	3.34	+0.22	0	0
There is One Poland	7,496	1.49	New	0	New
Total	501,870	100.00	–	12	0

=== 2nd constituency (Wałbrzych) ===
Party	Votes	%	+/–	Seats	+/–
Civic Coalition	120,188	37.17	+5.08	4	+1
Law and Justice	107,797	33.34	−7.20	3	−1
Third Way	39,215	12.13	+4.87	1	+1
The Left	25,806	7.98	−4.37	0	−1
Confederation	19,478	6.02	+0.60	0	0
Nonpartisan Local Government Activists	5,808	1.80	−0.55	0	0
There is One Poland	5,068	1.57	New	0	New
Total	323,360	100.00	–	8	0

=== 3rd constituency (Wrocław) ===
Party	Votes	%	+/–	Seats	+/–
Civic Coalition	286,713	36.94	+4.15	6	+1
Law and Justice	206,899	26.66	−8.01	4	−1
Third Way	106,624	13.74	+7.28	2	+1
The Left	88,089	11.35	−4.06	1	−1
Confederation	54,132	6.98	−0.48	1	0
Nonpartisan Local Government Activists	22,412	2.89	−0.32	0	0
There is One Poland	11,185	1.44	New	0	New
Total	776,054	100.00	–	14	0

=== 4th constituency (Bydgoszcz) ===
Party	Votes	%	+/–	Seats	+/–
Civic Coalition	186,914	35.01	+3.95	5	+1
Law and Justice	162,603	30.45	−5.97	4	−1
Third Way	80,426	15.06	+6.04	2	+1
The Left	52,959	9.92	−5.25	1	−1
Confederation	34,266	6.42	−0.63	0	0
Nonpartisan Local Government Activists	8,905	1.67	+0.38	0	0
There is One Poland	7,846	1.47	New	0	New
Total	533,919	100.00	–	12	0

=== 5th constituency (Toruń) ===
Party	Votes	%	+/–	Seats	+/–
Law and Justice	183,131	34.06	−6.31	5	−1
Civic Coalition	158,719	29.52	+3.10	4	0
Third Way	84,308	15.68	+4.80	2	+1
The Left	60,473	11.25	−3.58	1	−1
Confederation	34,232	6.37	+0.04	1	+1
Nonpartisan Local Government Activists	7,758	1.44	+0.29	0	0
There is One Poland	6,710	1.25	New	0	New
Prosperity and Peace Movement	2,266	0.42	New	0	New
Total	537,597	100.00	–	13	0

=== 6th constituency (Lublin) ===
Party	Votes	%	+/–	Seats	+/–
Law and Justice	294,847	45.48	−9.91	8	−1
Civic Coalition	131,712	20.32	+1.01	3	0
Third Way	102,894	15.87	+6.77	2	+1
Confederation	54,325	8.38	+1.30	1	0
The Left	37,083	5.72	−2.09	1	0
There is One Poland	14,892	2.30	New	0	New
Nonpartisan Local Government Activists	10,344	1.60	+0.27	0	0
Prosperity and Peace Movement	2,250	0.35	New	0	New
Total	648,347	100.00	–	15	0

=== 7th constituency (Chełm) ===
Party	Votes	%	+/–	Seats	+/–
Law and Justice	231,882	50.75	−8.75	7	−1
Civic Coalition	79,501	17.40	+2.60	2	0
Third Way	59,577	13.04	+1.18	2	+1
Confederation	35,594	7.79	+1.95	1	+1
The Left	25,691	5.62	−1.21	0	−1
There is One Poland	12,930	2.83	New	0	New
Nonpartisan Local Government Activists	9,522	2.08	+0.92	0	0
Prosperity and Peace Movement	2,175	0.48	New	0	New
Total	456,872	100.00	–	12	0

=== 8th constituency (Zielona Góra) ===
Party	Votes	%	+/–	Seats	+/–
Civic Coalition	195,091	37.73	+6.46	5	+1
Law and Justice	143,530	27.76	−6.54	4	0
Third Way	77,933	15.07	+3.44	2	+1
The Left	47,911	9.27	−6.34	1	−1
Confederation	33,672	6.51	−0.68	0	−1
Nonpartisan Local Government Activists	11,954	2.31	New	0	New
There is One Poland	5,794	1.12	New	0	New
Anti-party	1,156	0.22	New	0	New
Total	517,041	100.00	–	12	0

=== 9th constituency (Łódź) ===
Party	Votes	%	+/–	Seats	+/–
Civic Coalition	187,527	41.07	+5.26	5	+1
Law and Justice	122,433	26.82	−6.09	3	−1
The Left	55,770	12.22	−7.88	1	−1
Third Way	54,283	11.89	+7.36	1	+1
Confederation	25,428	5.57	−1.08	0	0
Nonpartisan Local Government Activists	5,624	1.23	New	0	New
There is One Poland	5,487	1.20	New	0	New
Total	456,552	100.00	–	10	0

=== 10th constituency (Piotrków Trybunalski) ===
Party	Votes	%	+/–	Seats	+/–
Law and Justice	184,929	46.60	−9.60	6	0
Civic Coalition	86,083	21.69	+6.05	2	+1
Third Way	54,479	13.73	+3.29	1	0
Confederation	30,247	7.62	+0.86	0	0
The Left	25,340	6.39	−4.57	0	−1
Nonpartisan Local Government Activists	8,597	2.17	New	0	New
There is One Poland	5,457	1.38	New	0	New
Prosperity and Peace Movement	1,687	0.43	New	0	New
Total	396,819	100.00	–	9	0

=== 11th constituency (Sieradz) ===
Party	Votes	%	+/–	Seats	+/–
Law and Justice	221,031	41.46	−8.35	6	−1
Civic Coalition	138,038	25.89	+5.41	3	0
Third Way	77,313	14.50	+4.21	2	+1
The Left	41,188	7.73	−4.25	1	0
Confederation	36,383	6.82	+0.95	0	0
Nonpartisan Local Government Activists	8,653	1.62	+0.06	0	0
There is One Poland	7,747	1.45	New	0	New
Prosperity and Peace Movement	2,775	0.52	New	0	New
Total	533,128	100.00	–	12	0

=== 12th constituency (Kraków I) ===
Party	Votes	%	+/–	Seats	+/–
Law and Justice	156,308	42.86	−10.62	5	−1
Civic Coalition	88,408	24.24	+1.20	2	0
Third Way	54,585	14.97	+7.06	1	+1
Confederation	28,754	7.88	+0.82	0	0
The Left	22,036	6.04	−2.47	0	0
There is One Poland	8,093	2.22	New	0	New
Nonpartisan Local Government Activists	6,487	1.78	New	0	New
Total	364,671	100.00	–	8	0

=== 13th constituency (Kraków II) ===
Party	Votes	%	+/–	Seats	+/–
Civic Coalition	232,799	30.73	+0.25	5	+1
Law and Justice	232,430	30.68	−8.88	5	−1
Third Way	127,693	16.86	+9.58	2	+1
The Left	83,633	11.04	−1.97	1	−1
Confederation	58,435	7.71	−0.27	1	0
Nonpartisan Local Government Activists	11,416	1.51	+0.09	0	0
There is One Poland	11,116	1.47	New	0	New
Total	757,522	100.00	–	14	0

=== 14th constituency (Nowy Sącz) ===
Party	Votes	%	+/–	Seats	+/–
Law and Justice	229,587	53.73	−12.07	6	−2
Civic Coalition	68,804	16.10	+2.28	2	+1
Third Way	49,487	11.58	+4.23	1	0
Confederation	37,301	8.73	+1.77	1	+1
There is One Poland	17,876	4.18	New	0	New
The Left	13,594	3.18	−2.89	0	0
Nonpartisan Local Government Activists	10,643	2.49	New	0	New
Total	427,292	100.00	–	10	0

=== 15th constituency (Tarnów) ===
Party	Votes	%	+/–	Seats	+/–
Law and Justice	196,433	48.67	−10.92	5	−2
Third Way	75,229	18.64	+5.29	2	+1
Civic Coalition	68,690	17.02	+3.02	2	+1
Confederation	32,241	7.99	+0.87	0	0
The Left	16,152	4.00	−1.94	0	0
There is One Poland	9,280	2.30	New	0	New
Nonpartisan Local Government Activists	5,566	1.38	New	0	New
Total	403,591	100.00	–	9	0

=== 16th constituency (Płock) ===
Party	Votes	%	+/–	Seats	+/–
Law and Justice	195,218	44.11	−8.34	5	−1
Civic Coalition	99,146	22.40	+5.56	3	+1
Third Way	75,526	17.07	+1.89	2	+1
Confederation	28,877	6.52	+1.29	0	0
The Left	28,848	6.52	−2.24	0	−1
Nonpartisan Local Government Activists	8,984	2.03	+0.50	0	0
There is One Poland	5,968	1.35	New	0	New
Total	442,567	100.00	–	10	0

=== 17th constituency (Radom) ===
Party	Votes	%	+/–	Seats	+/–
Law and Justice	190,418	48.68	−9.15	6	0
Civic Coalition	82,003	20.96	+3.81	2	0
Third Way	54,690	13.98	+3.78	1	0
Confederation	28,593	7.31	+1.42	0	0
The Left	20,874	5.34	−2.09	0	0
Nonpartisan Local Government Activists	6,673	1.71	+0.94	0	0
There is One Poland	5,983	1.53	New	0	New
Prosperity and Peace Movement	1,968	0.50	New	0	New
Total	391,202	100.00	–	9	0

=== 18th constituency (Siedlce) ===
Party	Votes	%	+/–	Seats	+/–
Law and Justice	262,236	48.62	−11.14	7	−2
Civic Coalition	100,902	18.71	+4.77	2	0
Third Way	83,681	15.51	+3.57	2	+1
Confederation	44,299	8.21	+1.72	1	+1
The Left	26,149	4.85	−1.61	0	0
There is One Poland	10,229	1.90	New	0	New
Nonpartisan Local Government Activists	10,045	1.86	+0.75	0	0
Normal Country	1,044	0.19	New	0	New
Repair Poland Movement	823	0.15	New	0	New
Total	539,408	100.00	–	12	0

=== 19th constituency (Warszawa I) ===
Party	Votes	%	+/–	Seats	+/–
Civic Coalition	741,286	43.23	+1.18	9	0
Law and Justice	345,380	20.14	−7.35	4	−2
The Left	230,648	13.45	−4.74	3	0
Third Way	227,127	13.25	+8.49	3	+2
Confederation	124,220	7.24	−0.27	1	0
Nonpartisan Local Government Activists	23,450	1.37	New	0	New
There is One Poland	22,608	1.32	New	0	New
Total	1,714,719	100.00	–	20	0

==== Voters abroad and on ships ====
Party	Votes	%	+/–
Civic Coalition	257,454	45.19	+6.24
Law and Justice	92,634	16.26	−8.63
The Left	82,532	14.49	−6.18
Third Way	69,382	12.18	+8.07
Confederation	51,137	8.97	−2.42
There is One Poland	10,279	1.80	New
Nonpartisan Local Government Activists	6,357	1.12	New
Total	569,775	100.00	–

=== 20th constituency (Warszawa II) ===
Party	Votes	%	+/–	Seats	+/–
Civic Coalition	257,470	35.23	+6.63	4	0
Law and Justice	231,905	31.74	−9.16	4	−2
Third Way	110,086	15.06	+6.47	2	+1
Confederation	51,573	7.06	+0.43	1	+1
The Left	51,556	7.06	−6.03	1	0
Nonpartisan Local Government Activists	16,571	2.27	+0.08	0	0
There is One Poland	11,583	1.59	New	0	New
Total	730,744	100.00	–	12	0

=== 21st constituency (Opole) ===
Party	Votes	%	+/–	Seats	+/–
Civic Coalition	161,241	33.59	+6.88	5	+1
Law and Justice	150,022	31.26	−6.39	4	−1
Third Way	61,155	12.74	+2.43	1	0
The Left	34,763	7.24	−4.49	1	0
Confederation	31,150	6.49	+0.79	1	+1
German Minority	25,778	5.37	−2.53	0	−1
There is One Poland	8,338	1.74	New	0	New
Nonpartisan Local Government Activists	7,521	1.57	New	0	New
Total	479,968	100.00	–	12	0

=== 22nd constituency (Krosno) ===
Party	Votes	%	+/–	Seats	+/–
Law and Justice	241,790	54.70	−8.66	7	−1
Civic Coalition	70,054	15.85	−0.09	2	0
Third Way	60,938	13.79	+5.94	1	0
Confederation	38,080	8.62	+1.80	1	+1
The Left	19,750	4.47	−1.57	0	0
Nonpartisan Local Government Activists	9,165	2.07	New	0	New
Prosperity and Peace Movement	2,219	0.50	New	0	New
Total	441,996	100.00	–	11	0

=== 23rd constituency (Rzeszów) ===
Party	Votes	%	+/–	Seats	+/–
Law and Justice	347,688	51.60	−10.77	9	−1
Civic Coalition	119,259	17.70	+3.31	3	+1
Third Way	83,676	12.42	+4.63	2	+1
Confederation	63,854	9.48	+1.22	1	0
The Left	32,828	4.87	−1.72	0	−1
There is One Poland	16,169	2.40	New	0	New
Nonpartisan Local Government Activists	10,302	1.53	New	0	New
Total	673,776	100.00	–	15	0

=== 24th constituency (Białystok) ===
Party	Votes	%	+/–	Seats	+/–
Law and Justice	258,277	42.39	−9.64	7	−1
Civic Coalition	126,971	20.84	−0.20	3	0
Third Way	114,898	18.86	+9.53	3	+2
Confederation	59,648	9.79	+2.84	1	0
The Left	29,478	4.84	−4.26	0	−1
There is One Poland	9,998	1.64	New	0	New
Nonpartisan Local Government Activists	7,081	1.16	+0.39	0	0
Prosperity and Peace Movement	2,893	0.47	New	0	New
Total	609,244	100.00	–	14	0

=== 25th constituency (Gdańsk) ===
Party	Votes	%	+/–	Seats	+/–
Civic Coalition	257,009	41.70	+0.39	6	0
Law and Justice	155,318	25.20	−6.90	3	−1
Third Way	90,599	14.70	+8.80	2	+2
The Left	57,967	9.41	−4.06	1	0
Confederation	38,406	6.23	−0.98	0	−1
Nonpartisan Local Government Activists	8,871	1.44	New	0	New
There is One Poland	8,117	1.32	New	0	New
Total	616,287	100.00	–	12	0

=== 26th constituency (Słupsk) ===
Party	Votes	%	+/–	Seats	+/–
Civic Coalition	258,909	37.91	+2.06	6	+1
Law and Justice	199,709	29.24	−7.19	4	−1
Third Way	92,793	13.59	+5.64	2	+1
The Left	56,887	8.33	−4.14	1	−1
Confederation	49,203	7.21	−0.09	1	0
There is One Poland	14,314	2.10	New	0	New
Nonpartisan Local Government Activists	11,084	1.62	New	0	New
Total	682,899	100.00	–	14	0

=== 27th constituency (Bielsko-Biała I) ===
Party	Votes	%	+/–	Seats	+/–
Law and Justice	163,506	36.71	−10.05	4	−1
Civic Coalition	127,677	28.67	+1.47	3	0
Third Way	64,778	14.55	+7.42	1	+1
Confederation	34,909	7.84	+0.41	1	+1
The Left	34,601	7.77	−3.71	0	−1
There is One Poland	10,950	2.46	New	0	New
Nonpartisan Local Government Activists	7,683	1.73	New	0	New
Normal Country	1,242	0.28	New	0	New
Total	445,346	100.00	–	9	0

=== 28th constituency (Częstochowa) ===
Party	Votes	%	+/–	Seats	+/–
Law and Justice	117,756	36.35	−7.93	3	−1
Civic Coalition	94,313	29.11	+6.49	3	+1
Third Way	47,698	14.72	+6.04	1	+1
The Left	30,497	9.41	−6.17	0	−1
Confederation	21,256	6.56	+0.49	0	0
Nonpartisan Local Government Activists	6,775	2.09	−0.66	0	0
There is One Poland	5,646	1.74	New	0	New
Total	323,941	100.00	–	7	0

=== 29th constituency (Katowice I) ===
Party	Votes	%	+/–	Seats	+/–
Civic Coalition	139,711	36.06	+3.46	4	0
Law and Justice	116,827	30.16	−7.59	3	−1
Third Way	51,681	13.34	+7.35	1	+1
The Left	35,673	9.21	−4.17	1	0
Confederation	26,934	6.95	−0.71	0	0
There is One Poland	9,204	2.38	New	0	New
Nonpartisan Local Government Activists	7,378	1.90	−0.70	0	0
Total	387,408	100.00	–	9	0

=== 30th constituency (Bielsko-Biała II) ===
Party	Votes	%	+/–	Seats	+/–
Law and Justice	145,230	38.06	−10.22	4	−1
Civic Coalition	114,404	29.98	+2.27	3	0
Third Way	47,525	12.45	+6.82	1	+1
Confederation	30,527	8.00	+0.83	1	+1
The Left	26,117	6.84	−2.83	0	−1
There is One Poland	9,148	2.40	New	0	New
Nonpartisan Local Government Activists	8,647	2.27	+0.73	0	0
Total	381,598	100.00	–	9	0

=== 31st constituency (Katowice II) ===
Party	Votes	%	+/–	Seats	+/–
Civic Coalition	193,596	36.79	−0.40	5	0
Law and Justice	162,458	30.88	−8.31	4	−1
Third Way	69,825	13.27	+8.90	1	+1
The Left	44,509	8.46	−3.46	1	0
Confederation	35,240	6.70	−0.63	1	0
There is One Poland	11,051	2.10	New	0	New
Nonpartisan Local Government Activists	9,488	1.80	New	0	New
Total	526,167	100.00	–	12	0

=== 32nd constituency (Katowice III) ===
Party	Votes	%	+/–	Seats	+/–
Civic Coalition	114,519	30.30	+0.64	3	0
Law and Justice	112,389	29.74	−7.40	3	−1
The Left	81,646	21.60	−0.30	2	0
Third Way	37,221	9.85	+5.00	1	+1
Confederation	21,512	5.69	−0.76	0	0
Nonpartisan Local Government Activists	5,499	1.45	New	0	New
There is One Poland	5,173	1.37	New	0	New
Total	377,959	100.00	–	9	0

=== 33rd constituency (Kielce) ===
Party	Votes	%	+/–	Seats	+/–
Law and Justice	310,266	47.07	−8.11	8	−2
Civic Coalition	137,941	20.93	+4.28	4	+1
Third Way	90,975	13.80	+3.93	2	+1
The Left	45,048	6.83	−3.11	1	0
Confederation	43,197	6.55	+0.61	1	0
Nonpartisan Local Government Activists	18,961	2.88	+1.93	0	0
There is One Poland	9,090	1.38	New	0	New
Prosperity and Peace Movement	2,310	0.35	New	0	New
Normal Country	1,344	0.20	New	0	New
Total	659,132	100.00	–	16	0

=== 34th constituency (Elbląg) ===
Party	Votes	%	+/–	Seats	+/–
Law and Justice	105,373	35.20	−5.66	4	0
Civic Coalition	95,410	31.87	+3.43	3	+1
Third Way	46,101	15.40	+4.51	1	0
The Left	24,269	8.11	−3.53	0	−1
Confederation	19,590	6.54	+0.89	0	0
Nonpartisan Local Government Activists	4,322	1.44	−1.08	0	0
There is One Poland	3,339	1.12	New	0	New
Normal Country	976	0.33	New	0	New
Total	299,380	100.00	–	8	0

=== 35th constituency (Olsztyn) ===
Party	Votes	%	+/–	Seats	+/–
Civic Coalition	129,339	33.07	+6.61	4	+1
Law and Justice	126,432	32.33	−6.49	4	−1
Third Way	63,007	16.11	+2.92	1	0
The Left	31,631	8.09	−5.75	1	0
Confederation	27,119	6.93	−0.04	0	0
Nonpartisan Local Government Activists	7,728	1.98	New	0	New
There is One Poland	5,802	1.48	New	0	New
Total	391,058	100.00	–	10	0

=== 36th constituency (Kalisz) ===
Party	Votes	%	+/–	Seats	+/–
Law and Justice	194,416	35.85	−6.63	5	−1
Civic Coalition	154,990	28.58	+3.86	4	+1
Third Way	87,628	16.16	+3.36	2	+1
The Left	46,222	8.52	−4.91	1	−1
Confederation	37,838	6.98	+0.41	0	0
Nonpartisan Local Government Activists	12,934	2.39	New	0	New
There is One Poland	8,239	1.52	New	0	New
Total	542,267	100.00	–	12	0

=== 37th constituency (Konin) ===
Party	Votes	%	+/–	Seats	+/–
Law and Justice	162,192	38.69	−8.61	4	−1
Civic Coalition	100,580	23.99	+3.51	2	0
Third Way	69,740	16.63	+6.83	2	+1
The Left	39,761	9.48	−5.55	1	0
Confederation	29,208	6.97	+0.22	0	0
Nonpartisan Local Government Activists	9,851	2.35	New	0	New
There is One Poland	5,776	1.38	New	0	New
Prosperity and Peace Movement	2,135	0.51	New	0	New
Total	419,243	100.00	–	9	0

=== 38th constituency (Piła) ===
Party	Votes	%	+/–	Seats	+/–
Civic Coalition	144,114	34.87	+4.27	4	+1
Law and Justice	120,301	29.11	−6.53	3	−1
Third Way	72,996	17.66	+3.81	2	+1
The Left	32,378	7.84	−5.45	0	−1
Confederation	28,370	6.87	+0.24	0	0
Nonpartisan Local Government Activists	7,878	1.91	New	0	New
There is One Poland	7,198	1.74	New	0	New
Total	413,235	100.00	–	9	0

=== 39th constituency (Poznań) ===
Party	Votes	%	+/–	Seats	+/–
Civic Coalition	262,779	44.09	−1.29	5	0
Law and Justice	116,666	19.57	−5.75	2	−1
Third Way	98,589	16.54	+10.35	2	+2
The Left	73,345	12.31	−4.18	1	−1
Confederation	35,182	5.90	−0.71	0	0
Nonpartisan Local Government Activists	9,477	1.59	New	0	New
Total	596,038	100.00	–	10	0

=== 40th constituency (Koszalin) ===
Party	Votes	%	+/–	Seats	+/–
Civic Coalition	124,625	38.69	+6.37	4	+1
Law and Justice	101,023	31.36	−5.47	3	0
Third Way	39,776	12.35	+2.91	1	0
The Left	28,101	8.72	−6.71	0	−1
Confederation	19,379	6.02	+0.03	0	0
Nonpartisan Local Government Activists	5,264	1.63	New	0	New
There is One Poland	3,981	1.24	New	0	New
Total	322,149	100.00	–	8	0

=== 41st constituency (Szczecin) ===
Party	Votes	%	+/–	Seats	+/–
Civic Coalition	222,427	40.13	+4.42	6	+1
Law and Justice	159,575	28.79	−6.32	4	0
Third Way	69,957	12.62	+5.22	1	0
The Left	52,032	9.39	−5.86	1	−1
Confederation	32,942	5.94	−0.59	0	0
Nonpartisan Local Government Activists	8,985	1.62	New	0	New
There is One Poland	6,218	1.12	New	0	New
Prosperity and Peace Movement	2,172	0.39	New	0	New
Total	554,308	100.00	–	12	0
