= Jacek Tomczak =

Polish politician and lawyer (born 1973)

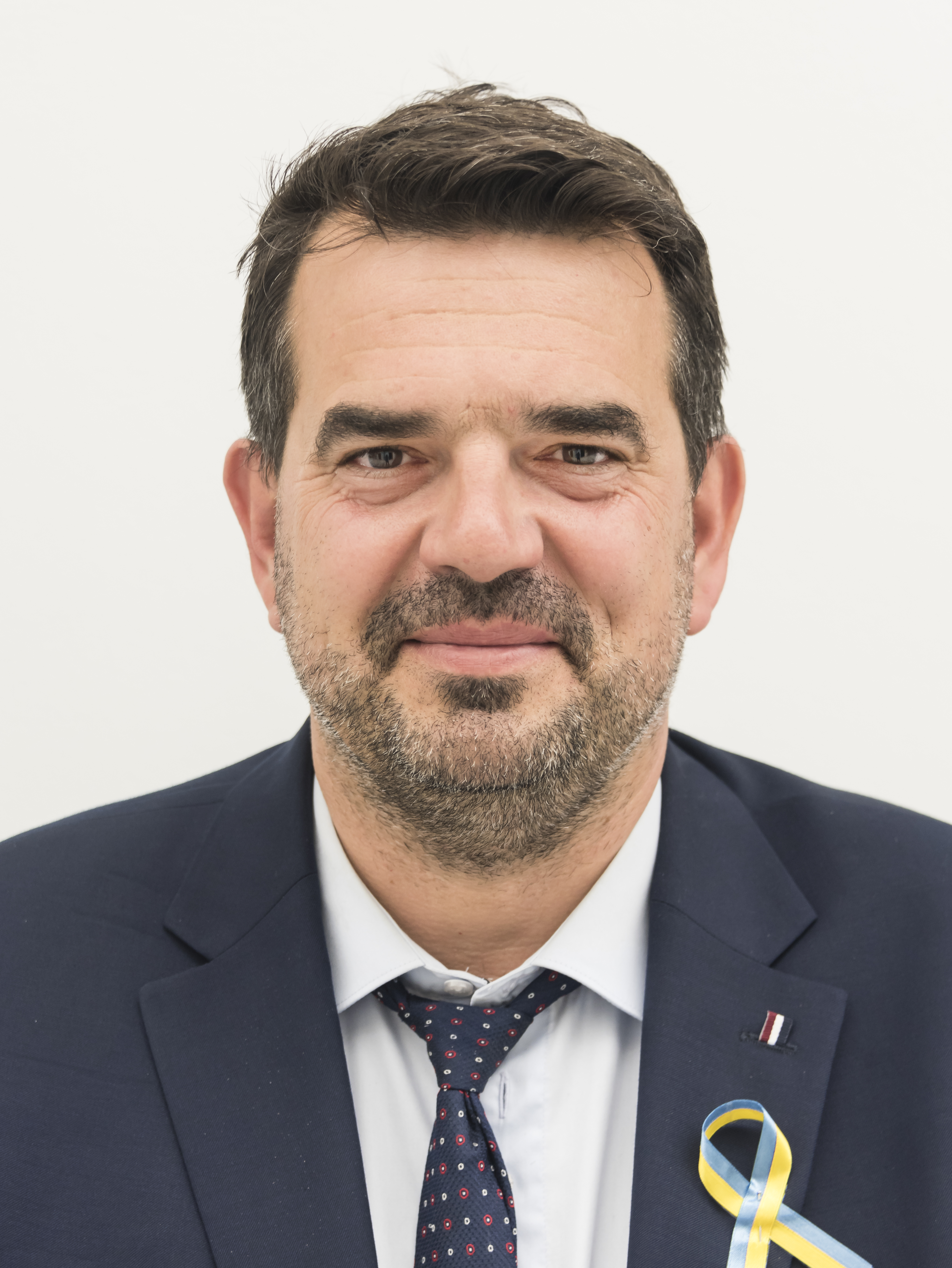

Member of the Sejm
- Incumbent
- Assumed office 25 September 2005
- Constituency: 39 – Poznań

Personal details
- Born: 27 July 1973 (age 52) Poznań
- Party: Independent
- Other political affiliations: Law and Justice (2005–10); Poland Comes First (2010-2011)
- Profession: Lawyer

Jacek Jerzy Tomczak (born July 27, 1973, in Poznań) is a Polish politician and lawyer. He is a member of the Sejm for Poland Comes First, having been a member for Law and Justice from 2005 to 2010.

He was elected to Sejm on 25 September 2005 getting 17991 votes in Poznań, standing for Law and Justice (PiS). He joined Poland Comes First when that party split from PiS in 2010.

On 13 October 2022, Tomczak joined the newly-launched Centre for Poland, which will be part of the Polish Coalition.

== See also ==
- Members of Polish Sejm 2005-2007
