= Ireneusz Raś =

Polish politician

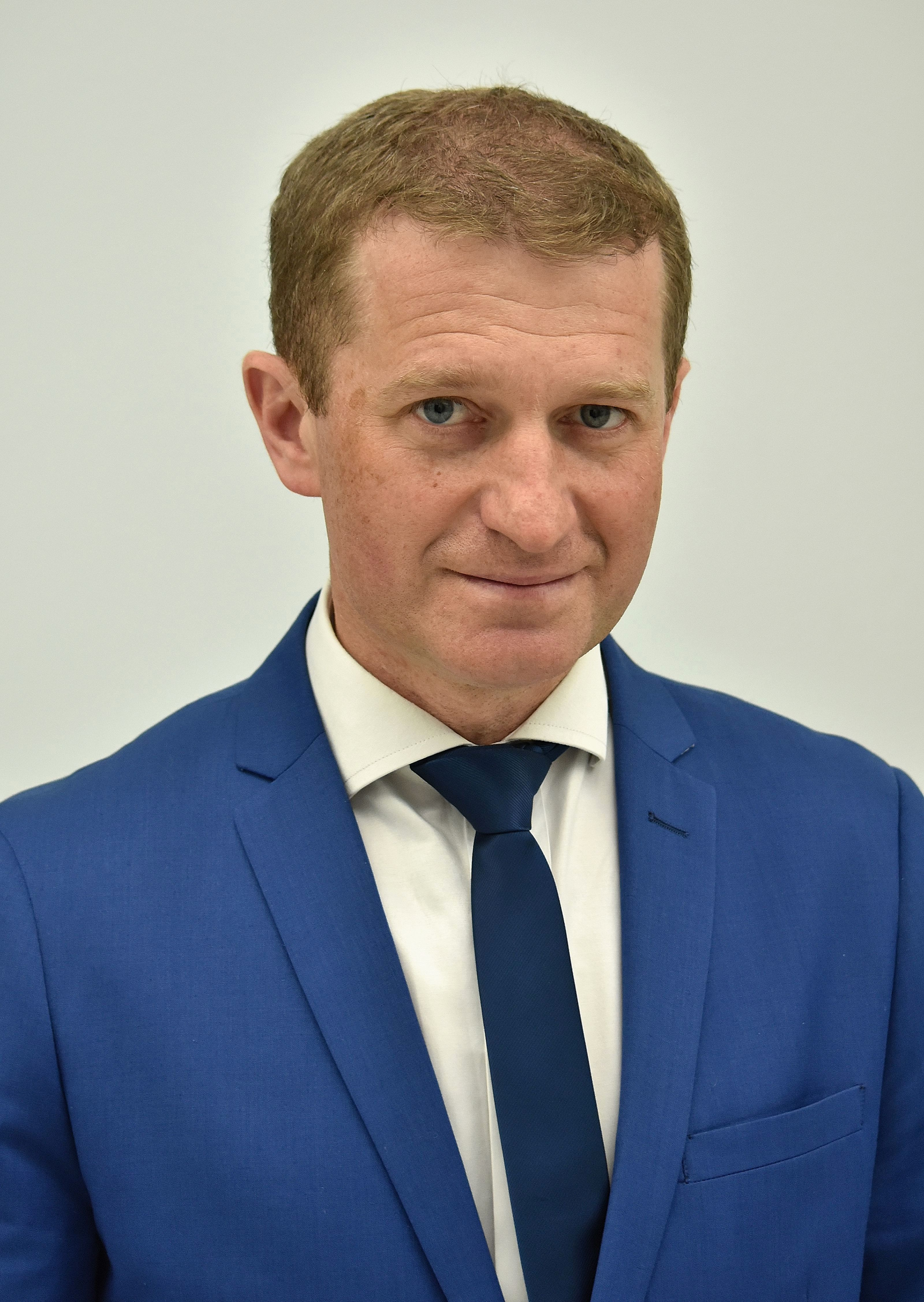

Member of the Sejm
- Incumbent
- Assumed office 25 September 2005
- Constituency: 13 – Kraków

Personal details
- Born: 30 September 1972 (age 54)
- Party: Civic Platform (2005-2021)

Ireneusz Jacek Raś (born 30 September 1972 in Proszowice) is a Polish politician. He was elected to the Sejm on 25 September 2005, getting 6,690 votes in 13 Kraków district as a candidate from the Civic Platform list. In the 2019 Polish parliamentary election, he was elected to Sejm as a member of Civic Platform. He was expelled from the party in 2021. In June 2021 he joined Polish Coalition as an independent. On 13 October 2022, Rás launched the Centre for Poland as a political party, which will be a member of the Polish Coalition.

== See also ==
- Members of Polish Sejm 2005-2007
