= Jurassic-Silesian Association European Home =

Jurassic-Silesian Association European Home Polish: Jurajsko-Śląskie Stowarzyszenie Dom Europejski
- Abbreviation: JŚSDE
- Leader: Janusz Żakowski
- Chairman: Zbigniew Meres
- Secretary: Marek Miśta
- Registered: 28 April 2006
- Headquarters: al. Wolności 46, 42-217 Częstochowa
- Ideology: Silesian regionalism Environmentalism; Pro-Europeanism
- Political position: Centre-left
- National affiliation: Polish Coalition
- Colours: Red
- Sejm: 0 / 460
- Senate: 0 / 100
- European Parliament: 0 / 52
- Regional assemblies: 0 / 552

Jurassic-Silesian Association European Home (Polish: Jurajsko-Śląskie Stowarzyszenie Dom Europejski, JŚSDE) is a minor Silesian regionalist political association in Poland.

== Overview ==
It was registered on 28 April 2006, and participated in the 2014 Polish local elections under the name National Electoral Committee Siewierz Gmina - Our Home (Polish: KWW Gmina Siewierz - Nasz Dom), where it won three seats in the municipal council of Siewierz. In 2015, the party worked together with Jerzy Buzek in organizing and promoting conferences and lectures centered on Silesian self-government. On 30 December 2015, the association became a state-supported association, and the authorities Gmina Irządze passed a legislation to become a 'supporting member' of it. On 5 August 2019, together with Silesians Together the JŚSDE became a part of the Polish Coalition led by the Polish People's Party. It participated in the 2019 Polish parliamentary election as part of the coalition. Its main goal is "building a self-governing, open and tolerant European civil society" in Silesia.

Along with Silesians Together, it is a left-leaning Silesian political association. The main focus of the JŚSDE is environmentalism, and green initiatives taken on local level. It also stresses the importance of preserving the Silesian language; together with Silesians Together, the organization declared: "We are going to the Polish Parliament so that the Silesian language does not die, but even more so that it develops, so that people can manage to speak Silesian." As part of the Polish Coalition, some of the coalition's policies JŚSDE supports are tax-free pensions, free vaccinations for children, lower social insurance payments for entrepreneurs, safe green energy, and recognition of the Silesian language as a regional language in Poland, and introduction of it in Silesian schools.

The Jurassic-Silesian Association European Home is also strongly regionalist and held conferences such as ‘Modern local government - a guarantee for regional development’. It postulates modernization and empowerment of local governments in Poland, and proposes giving them power to launch public-private partnerships, in which local governments could legally oblige local businesses to carry out public tasks, such as infrastructure expansion and maintenance. It supports the European Union and European integration and postulates development of local cultures and education within the EU, campaigning with slogans such as ‘All roads lead to Silesia’.

== See also ==
- Silesians Together
- Union of Upper Silesians
- Silesian People's Party
- Silesian Regional Party
- German Minority (political party)
- Silesian Autonomy Movement
- Polish Coalition
