= Union of Christian Families =

Union of Christian Families Zjednoczenie Chrześcijańskich Rodzin
- Logo
- Abbreviation: ZChR
- Chairman: Bogusław Rogalski
- Founders: Bogusław Rogalski; Piotr Szymanowicz; Paweł Kot
- Founded: 2 July 2015; 11 years ago
- Split from: League of Polish Families
- Preceded by: Christian National Union; Forward Poland
- Headquarters: Woryty 79G, 11-036 Gietrzwałd
- Ideology: Christian democracy Euroscepticism
- Political position: Right-wing
- Religion: Roman Catholicism
- Colors: Blue; Red; White
- Sejm: 0 / 460
- Senators: 0 / 100
- MEPs: 0 / 53
- Sejmiks: 0 / 552

Website
- zchr.pl

Union of Christian Families (Polish: Zjednoczenie Chrześcijańskich Rodzin; ZChR) is a minor Polish Christian democratic political party. Founded in 2015, it is led by former MEP Bogusław Rogalski. The party's politicians ran in the parliamentary elections in 2019 from the Confederation Liberty and Independence lists (but did not join the party federation itself).

In the 2025 presidential election, the party endorsed the Law and Justice candidate for the second round Karol Nawrocki.
