= Robert Gwiazdowski =

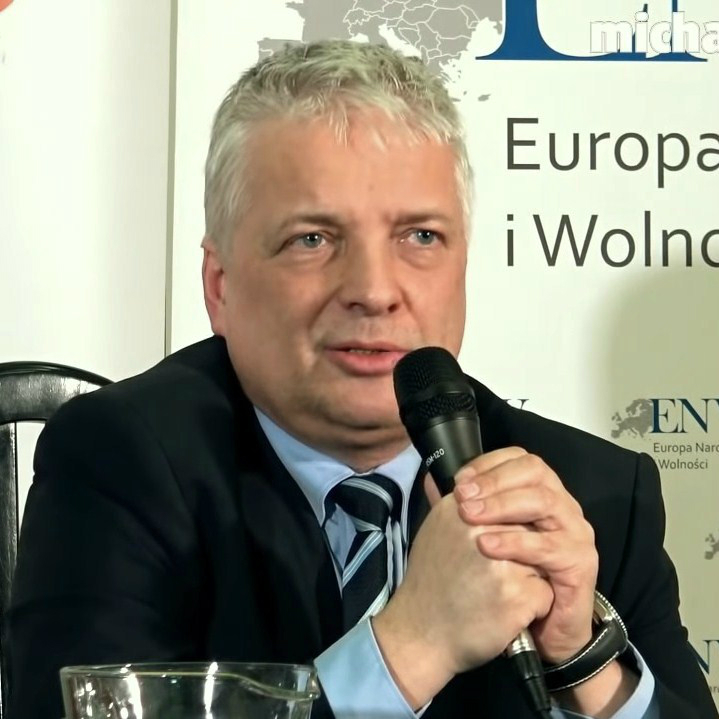
Robert Gwiazdowski in 2017

Robert Gwiazdowski (born 23 March 1960) is a Polish habilitated doctor of jurisprudence and economist. He studied law on the University of Warsaw. In 2004, he was appointed president of the Adam Smith Centre. From 2006 to 2007 he was the head of supervisory board of Social Insurance Institution, a Polish state organization responsible for social insurance matters. He authored books on economics and taxes. He is a supporter of the free market, criticizes socialism on the ground that it is an ineffective and unjust economical system and advocates lowering taxes as a way of incentivizing the entrepreneurs to set up new businesses. He is a specialist in the history of political thought and from time to time appears in various television programmes.
