= Poland Fair Play =

Poland Fair Play Polska Fair Play
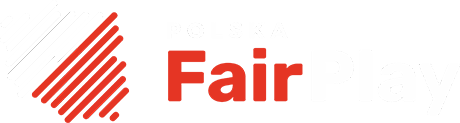
- Leader: Robert Gwiazdowski
- President: Piotr Roman
- Founded: 2 March 2019
- Dissolved: 4 June 2019
- Headquarters: ul. Artura Oppmana 5, 51-142, Wrocław
- Ideology: Conservative liberalism Economic liberalism Classical liberalism Pro-Europeanism; Anti-socialism
- Political position: Centre-right

Website
- https://polskafairplay.org/

Poland Fair Play (Polish: Polska Fair Play) was a Polish centre-right non-partisan local government movement founded on 2 March 2019 by Robert Gwiazdowski for the 2019 European Parliament election. Subsequently, the party was dissolved on 4 June 2019.

== Fair Play State ==
On 13 December 2019, a few former politicians of Poland Fair Play led by Jolanta Milas founded the Fair Play Country Association (Państwo Fair Play), as part of the Polish Coalition. Fair Play Country Association is an official member of the council of Polish Coalition and it is unofficially supported by Robert Gwiazdowski.
