= Union of European Democrats =

Political party in Poland

Union of European Democrats Unia Europejskich Demokratów
- Abbreviation: UED
- Leader: Elżbieta Bińczycka
- Founded: 12 November 2016
- Dissolved: 12 July 2026
- Preceded by: Democratic Party – demokraci.pl
- Merged into: Centre Union
- Youth wing: Europe of the Youth
- Membership (2026): 500
- Ideology: Conservative liberalism; Social liberalism; European federalism
- Political position: Centre to centre-right
- National affiliation: Third Way; Polish Coalition
- European affiliation: European People's Party (in the Council of Europe)
- Colours: Blue; Red; Gold

Website
- uniaeuropejskichdemokratow.pl

The Union of European Democrats (Polish: Unia Europejskich Demokratów, Polish pronunciation: [ˈuɲ.ja ɛw.rɔˈpɛj.skix dɛ.mɔˈkra.tuf]; UED) was a liberal-conservative political party in Poland. It was led by Elżbieta Bińczycka.

It was founded as a merger of the Democratic Party – demokraci.pl and "European Democrats" in November 2016. It joined the parliamentary group of the Polish People's Party in 2018, and later participated in the upcoming elections under the European Coalition and the Polish Coalition. Ideologically, it supported the principles of liberal conservatism and social liberalism, and also advocated for a more federal European Union.

UED was a legal successor of the Democratic Union and the Freedom Union until its dissolution after merging with Centre Poland to establish the Centre Union.

== History ==
=== Early history and formation ===
During the extraordinary congress of the Democratic Party – demokraci.pl, its structures were merged with the "European Democrats" association, gathered around a four-member parliamentary group, and formally changed the name of the party to the "Union of European Democrats". Its first president became Elżbieta Bińczycka and Jacek Protasiewicz was elected as the vice-president. Former president of Poland Lech Wałęsa and the chairman of the Committee for the Defence of Democracy Mateusz Kijowski spoke at the party's founding conference, and letters were read from former presidents Bronisław Komorowski and Aleksander Kwaśniewski.

=== Elections period (2016–2019) ===
In January 2018, Michał Kamiński, a prominent member of UED, joined the parliamentary club led by the Polish People's Party. Soon after, they established a joint parliamentary club with Jacek Protasiewicz as the vice-president, while Kamiński was chosen to be a part of the presidium. Protasiewicz later left to join Modern. During the 2018 local elections, UED participated with various parties.

Shortly before the 2019 European Parliament election, it joined the European Coalition which was established by the Civic Platform, Democratic Left Alliance, and Polish People's Party. UED's candidate was Elżbieta Bińczycka and she obtained 6,540 votes but no seats.

During June and July 2019, UED held discussions about joining the Polish Coalition, after which it joined. During the 2019 parliamentary election, UED obtained 29,832 votes and Jacek Protasiewicz was elected as its MP.

=== Modern period (2020–present) ===
During the 2020 presidential election, it supported Władysław Kosiniak-Kamysz as the candidate for the Polish Coalition. In the second round, UED voiced its support for Rafał Trzaskowski.

=== Merger ===
On 12 July 2026, the party merged with the political association Centre Poland to create Centre Union, with Paulina Hennig-Kloska as the leader. The party's stated ideology is combining economic growth with environmental protection. The merger is to be based on the structures of the Union of European Democrats given it slong history; as such, EUD formally changed its name to Centre Union while incorporating the environment of Centre Poland into its ranks. The party had 800 members at the time of its creation (500 original EUD members and 300 Centre Poland activists) and became a member o the Alliance of Liberals and Democrats for Europe Party.

== European affiliation ==
The UED was not officially affiliated with any European party. Its predecessor, the Democratic Party, was affiliated with the Alliance of Liberals and Democrats for Europe Party with MEPs in the liberal group. However, UED MP Jacek Protasiewicz was a member of the European People's Party group in the Parliamentary Assembly of the Council of Europe, which corresponds to the European membership of the Polish People's Party and Protasiewicz's previous party (Civic Platform).

== Ideology and program ==
The Union of European Democrats was largely a liberal conservative and social-liberal party that was described as centrist, or centre-right.

The party was formed by conservative defectors from the Civic Platform as well as former members of the Poland Fair Play party. It was a member of the Polish Coalition, a centre-right political coalition.

It advocated for the federalisation of the European Union.

=== Program ===
The party program declaration was concerned with the defense of Polish democracy, support for Poland's membership of the European Union and NATO, and the putative threats to Poland posed by Russia. The UED supported the creation of a federal Europe. The party also advocated civil service reform, the separation of church and state, and the introduction of civil partnerships.

== Election results ==
=== Sejm ===
Election	Leader	Votes	%	Seats	+/–	Government
2019	Elżbieta Bińczycka	1,578,523	8.6 (#3)	1 / 460	New	Opposition
2019	As part of the Polish Coalition, that won 30 seats in total.					
2023	Elżbieta Bińczycka	3,110,670	14.4 (#3)	0 / 460	▼1	Extra-parliamentary
2023	As part of the Third Way coalition, that won 65 seats in total.					

=== Senate ===
Election	Leader	Votes	%	Seats	+/–	Majority
2019	Elżbieta Bińczycka	1,041,909	5.7	1 / 100	New	KO-PSL-SLD
2019	As part of the Polish Coalition, that won 3 seats in total.					
2023	Elżbieta Bińczycka	2,462,360	11.5	1 / 100	0	KO-TD-NL
2023	As part of the Third Way coalition, that won 11 seats in total.					

=== European Parliament ===
Election	Leader	Votes	%	Seats	+/–	EP Group
2019	Elżbieta Bińczycka	5,249,935	38.47 (#2)	0 / 52	New	–
2019	As part of the European Coalition, that won 22 seats in total					
2024	Elżbieta Bińczycka	813,238	6.91 (#4)	0 / 53	0	–
2024	As part of the Third Way coalition, that won 3 seats in total					
