= Third Way (Poland) =

Third Way Trzecia Droga
- Founded: 27 April 2023; 3 years ago
- Dissolved: 17 June 2025
- Membership: Poland 2050; Polish Coalition
- Ideology: Christian democracy Pro-Europeanism; Conservatism
- Political position: Centre-right
- Colors: Yellow (Poland 2050); Green (Polish Coalition)

Website
- web.archive.org/web/20250831081002/https://trzeciadroga.org/

The Third Way (Polish: Trzecia Droga, TD) was a political alliance in Poland that was formed on 27 April 2023, before the 2023 parliamentary election. The coalition's aim was to provide an alternative to both Law and Justice and Civic Platform, the dominant political parties in Poland since the 2000s. The coalition was created by centre-right Poland 2050 of Szymon Hołownia and the conservative Polish People's Party, which leads the centre-right Polish Coalition. It was disbanded on 17 June 2025.

== History ==
Unofficial cooperation between Poland 2050 and Polish People's Party was announced by Szymon Hołownia and Władysław Kosiniak-Kamysz on 7 February 2023 as a "common list of things to do". The two parties expressed willingness to cooperate in areas such as the judicial system, education and local government.

On 27 April, the parties announced they'd be running together in the 2023 parliamentary elections, officially revealing the name of the coalition on 15 May. Despite heavy cooperation during the campaign, both parties opted to create two separate political groups in the next Sejm.

Both leaders expressed openness to talks with other political parties and organizations, most notably Wolnościowcy, the Young Poland Association and the conservative wing of Civic Platform.

On 17 June 2025, the Executive Council of the Polish People's Party announced that it had decided to leave Third Way and run separately in the next parliamentary election. Poland 2050 stated that it accepts the decision of its partner and confirmed that it marks the end of the alliance. Political commentators noted that the decision was likely caused by poor performance in the polls - In June 2025, the Third Way was polling around 4%, way short of the 8% electoral threshold for coalitions running for the Sejm.

== Platform ==
The Third Way bloc was described as conservative, neoliberal-conservative, and Christian democratic. The coalition's goal was to convince former Law and Justice voters to switch to the opposition by creating a centrist or moderate conservative platform on the opposition. Per the manifesto of the Third Way, the coalition wanted to increase budget revenue, reform the school system, implement a climate policy based on renewable energy, and simplify the tax system. The alliance called for a referendum on the legality of abortion and allowed its members to take individual positions on social issues, although most leaned conservative. Its social ideology was described as moderate social conservatism. Economically, the party was liberal, and postulated a free-market approach. The party's program "focused primarily on right-wing economic propositions."

On foreign policy, Third Way was pro-NATO and pro-EU. It declared to stand for “full support for Ukraine, which Putin’s Russia has attacked”, and pledged to maintain Polish military support for Ukraine. At the same time, it also expressed concerns about the presence of Ukrainian products in Polish markets, and called for restricting food imports from Ukraine. The coalition also supported the European Sky Shield Initiative.

The Polish Coalition, led by the Polish People's Party, maintained a conservative and Christian democratic platform, influenced primarily by the Polish People's Party and Centre for Poland (a conservative split from the Civic Platform), whereas the Union of European Democrats represents social-liberal positions as the successor of the Freedom Union. Poland 2050 represented mainly centrist views with visible green politics influence; both Christian democratic and liberal influences were present, mainly due to former Civic Coalition politicians joining the party. However, since 2023, Poland 2050 started being seen as a centre-right, conservative party. Third Way became a socially conservative side of the 15 October Coalition.

The party's stance towards issues regarding LGBTQ issues was not made explicit. During a radio interview, Szymon Hołownia stated he was opposed to same-sex marriage, while noting that "his movement would follow a rule of voting according to one's conscience" if such question was brought up in parliament. Hołownia described the legalization of civil unions as a more rational alternative.

== Name ==
The name Third Way was primarily a reference to the party being an alternative to both the United Right, which is national conservative, and the Civic Coalition, which is a centre-right broad alliance. Despite some overlap, it did not associate itself with the Third Way political position.

== Composition ==
Name	Ideology	Position	Leader	MPs	Senators	MEPs	Sejmiks	Entry
Poland 2050	Christian democracy Environmentalism; Liberalism	Centre-right	Szymon Hołownia	32 / 460	5 / 100	1 / 53	3 / 552	27 April 2023
Polish Coalition (Note: The Polish Coalition also cooperates with non-parliamentary parties and organisations, e.g. Silesians Together, or Fair Play State, and moreover with non-partisan and local politicians.) •Polish People's Party •Union of European Democrats •Centre for Poland	Christian democracy Liberal conservatism	Right-wing	Władysław Kosiniak-Kamysz	32 / 460	7 / 100	2 / 53	69 / 552	27 April 2023

== Election results ==
=== Sejm ===
Election	Leader	Votes	%	Seats	+/–	Government	Ref.
2023	Szymon Hołownia; Władysław Kosiniak-Kamysz	3,110,670	14.4 (#3)	65 / 460	New	PiS Minority (2023)	
2023	Szymon Hołownia; Władysław Kosiniak-Kamysz	3,110,670	14.4 (#3)	65 / 460	New	KO-PL2050-KP-NL (2023-present)	

=== Presidential ===
Election	Candidate	First round		Second round	
Election	Candidate	Votes	%	Votes	%
2025	Szymon Hołownia	978,901	4.99 (#5)		

=== European Parliament ===
Election	Leader	Votes	%	Seats	+/–	EP Group
2024	Szymon Hołownia; Władysław Kosiniak-Kamysz	813,238	6.91 (#4)	3 / 53	New	EPP / RE

=== Regional Assemblies ===
Election	Leader	Votes	%	Seats	+/–
2024	Szymon Hołownia; Władysław Kosiniak-Kamysz	2,054,152	14.3 (#3)	80 / 552	New
