= Polish Coalition =

Polish political alliance

Polish Coalition Koalicja Polska
- Parliamentary leader: Władysław Kosiniak-Kamysz
- Chair: Vacant
- Deputy chairs: Władysław Kosiniak-Kamysz; Elżbieta Bińczycka; Marek Biernacki
- Founded: 4 July 2019
- Ideology: Christian democracy; Conservatism
- Political position: Centre to centre-right
- National affiliation: Third Way (2023–2025)
- Members: PSL; CdP; UED (until 2026)
- Sejm: 31 / 460 (7%)
- Senate: 7 / 100 (7%)
- European Parliament: 2 / 53 (4%)
- Regional assemblies: 54 / 552 (10%)
- City presidents: 1 / 107 (0.9%)

Website
- koalicjapolska.com.pl

The Polish Coalition (Polish: Koalicja Polska, KP) is a political alliance in Poland. It is led by the Polish People's Party.

It was formed in 2019. In the 2019 parliamentary election, the Polish Coalition placed fourth, winning 30 seats in total. Its 2020 presidential candidate was Władysław Kosiniak-Kamysz, who placed fifth in the first round. The coalition adheres to principles of Christian democracy, and conservatism. The coalition also adhered to agrarianism, but the Polish People's Party has since then shifted away from this ideology. It has been described as centrist and centre-right.

== History ==
=== Formation and parliamentary election ===
The coalition was first mentioned on 4 February 2019, at a press conference as a union of the Polish People's Party (PSL), the Union of European Democrats (UED) and Modern (N). The idea was supported by former mayor of Wrocław, Rafał Dutkiewicz. In the May 2019 European Parliament election, the PSL, Modern and UED participated in the European Coalition, which included centre-right, centrist and centre-left parties.

The PSL general council decided to build the Polish Coalition, a centre-right coalition, on 1 June of that year. The desire for a coalition was first declared by the League of Polish Families (LPR) and the UED. The PSL also held talks with Kukiz'15, the Right Wing of the Republic and the Nonpartisan Local Government Activists movement, and invited Civic Platform (PO).

The PSL-UED parliamentary coalition changed its name to PSL-Polish Coalition on 4 July 2019, and was joined by former members of PO (Marek Biernacki and Jacek Tomczak) and Modern (Radosław Lubczyk). Two days later, the PSL general council announced that an alliance with PO is a coalition priority. Władysław Kosiniak-Kamysz confirmed UED cooperation.

On 23 July, the PSL's Piotr Zgorzelski confirmed that the Alliance of Democrats and Labour Party were part of the coalition and talks with Kukiz'15 and Nonpartisan Local Governments Association were cordial and would end soon. A week later, Marek Sawicki confirmed that the Association of Catholic Families had joined the coalition.

The Silesians Together party and the Jura-Silesian Association European Home joined the coalition on 5 August 2019. Three days later (after losing several MPs), Kukiz'15 joined the coalition. One member each from Civic Platform and the League of Polish Families (LPR) were also on the PSL list, despite those parties not belonging to the coalition.

In the 2019 parliamentary election, the PSL received 8.6 percent of the vote; an improvement compared to the 2015 parliamentary election. The coalition gained 30 seats in the Sejm: 20 from the PSL, six from Kukiz'15, one from the UED, and three independents. It also gained three senators: two from the PSL and one from the UED.

=== Coalition since the end of 2019 ===
Władysław Kosiniak-Kamysz of the PSL became coalition's candidate for the 2020 presidential election. He received 459,365 votes which was 2.4%, coming fifth among eleven candidates

On 26 November 2020, the General Council of PSL ended coalition with Kukiz'15, after 5 of 6 MPs of K'15 voted in favour of government's veto on European budget. Parliamentary club has its changed its title to Polish Coalition - PSL, UED, Conservatives.

5 politicians of Kukiz'15 with Paweł Kukiz has formed their own group in parliament, Agnieszka Ścigaj (who voted as PSL in case of veto) became independent MP. She joined PSL parliamentary group, but later she resigned from this political group and became unaffiliated MP.

In 2021 Polish Coalition started unofficial cooperation with Polish Affairs and Agreement, and decided to talk with Poland 2050 and more conservative local activists of Civic Platform about possibilities of creating centre to centre-right political faction in Poland.

On 2 May 2022 Ireneusz Raś (a conservative dissident from Civic Platform) and independent MPs of Polish Coalition (former Civic Platform and Modern members) created conservative, Christian democratic Centre for Poland. On 28 February Polish Coalition signed Senate Pact agreement with other opposition parties.

On 27 April 2023 Polish Coalition became a member of wider centrist Third Way alliance with Poland 2050 of Szymon Hołownia. The coalition existed until June 2025. The coalition still cooperates as a unified club in the Senate.

On 12 July 2026 Union of European Democrats, a founding member of Polish Coalition, declared intention to join forces with the Centre Parliamentary Club (a liberal split from Poland 2050) to form Centre Union. For this reason, also considering PSL's declaration to run independently in the elections and the practical non-use of the name 'Polish Coalition', it is difficult to clearly determine the actual status of the block. The position of the Union of European Democrats senator, Michał Kamiński, who is closely associated with PSL, is also unclear. He is still a member of Third Way Senate club.

== Composition ==
=== 2019 election ===
Name	Ideology	Position	Leader	MPs	Senators	MEPs	Sejmiks	Entry
Polish People's Party	Christian democracy Conservatism	Right-wing	Władysław Kosiniak-Kamysz	20 / 460	2 / 100	3 / 51	70 / 552	4 July 2019
Union of European Democrats	Liberal conservatism Social liberalism	Centre to centre-right	Elżbieta Bińczycka	1 / 460	1 / 100	0 / 51	1 / 552	4 July 2019
Alliance of Democrats	Social democracy Christian democracy	Centre-left to left-wing	Paweł Piskorski	0 / 460	0 / 100	0 / 51	0 / 552	23 July 2019
Silesians Together	Silesian regionalism	Centre-left	Leon Swaczyna	0 / 460	0 / 100	0 / 51	0 / 552	5 August 2019
Poland Needs Us	National liberalism	Centre-right	Dariusz Grabowski	0 / 460	0 / 100	0 / 51	0 / 552	27 June 2019
One-PL	Social liberalism	Centre-right	Włodzimierz Zydorczak	0 / 460	0 / 100	0 / 51	0 / 552	10 September 2019
Kukiz'15	Right-wing populism	Centre-right to right-wing	Paweł Kukiz	6 / 460	0 / 100	0 / 51	0 / 552	8 August 2019
Polish Federation of the Associations of Catholic Families	Political Catholicism	Right-wing	Kazimierz Kapera					30 July 2019
Jurassic-Silesian Association European Home	Localism	Centre-left	Janusz Żakowski					5 August 2019
Independents: Marek Biernacki (elected from Civic Platform); Jacek Tomczak (elected from Civic Platform); Radosław Lubczyk (elected from Modern)				3 / 460	0 / 100	0 / 51	0 / 552	4 July 2019

=== 9th Sejm and 10th Senate ===
Name	Ideology	Position	Leader	MPs	Senators	MEPs	Sejmiks
Polish People's Party	Christian democracy Conservatism	Right-wing	Władysław Kosiniak-Kamysz	19 / 460	2 / 100	3 / 51	66 / 552
Union of European Democrats	Liberal conservatism Social liberalism	Centre to centre-right	Elżbieta Bińczycka	1 / 460	1 / 100	0 / 51	1 / 552
Silesians Together	Silesian regionalism	Centre-left	Leon Swaczyna	0 / 460	0 / 100	0 / 51	0 / 552
Centre for Poland	Liberal conservatism	Centre-right	Ireneusz Raś	3 / 460	1 / 100	0 / 51	0 / 552
Agreement	Liberal conservatism	Centre-right	Magdalena Sroka	3 / 460	1 / 100	0 / 51	6 / 552
Fair Play Country	Conservative liberalism	Centre-right	Jolanta Milas	0 / 460	0 / 100	0 / 51	0 / 552
Independents: Marek Biernacki; Jolanta Tyjas; Zygmunt Dziewguć				1 / 460	0 / 100	0 / 51	2 / 552
Former members
Kukiz'15	Right-wing populism	Centre-right to right-wing	Paweł Kukiz	4 / 460	0 / 100	0 / 51	0 / 552

=== 10th Sejm and 11th Senate (as part of Third Way coalition) ===
Name	Ideology	Position	Leader	MPs	Senators	MEPs	Sejmiks
Polish People's Party	Christian democracy Conservatism	Right-wing	Władysław Kosiniak-Kamysz	27 / 460	4 / 100	2 / 53	54 / 552
Centre for Poland	Liberal conservatism	Centre-right	Ireneusz Raś	3 / 460	1 / 100	0 / 53	0 / 552
Union of European Democrats	Liberal conservatism Social liberalism	Centre to centre-right	Elżbieta Bińczycka	0 / 460	1 / 100	0 / 53	0 / 552
Young Poland Association	Liberal conservatism	Centre-right	Jan Strzeżek	0 / 460	0 / 100	0 / 51	0 / 552
Independents: Marek Biernacki; Józef Zając				1 / 460	1 / 100	0 / 53	0 / 552
