= Centre for Poland =

Political party in Poland

Centre for Poland Centrum dla Polski
- Abbreviation: CdPL
- Leader: Ireneusz Raś
- Founded: 2 May 2022
- Registered: 437
- Split from: Civic Platform
- Headquarters: ul. Wiejska 4; 00-902 Warsaw
- Ideology: Conservatism; Christian democracy; Pro-Europeanism
- Political position: Centre-right
- National affiliation: Polish Coalition
- Colours: Blue
- Sejm: 3 / 460
- Senate: 0 / 100
- European Parliament: 0 / 53
- Regional assemblies: 0 / 552

Website
- centrumdlapolski.pl

The Centre for Poland (Polish: Centrum dla Polski) is a Polish conservative political party. It was formed on 2 May 2022 by the former Civic Platform MPs and the local government activists affiliated with the Polish Coalition. The goal of the group is to unify the conservative wing of the Coalition and to attract young conservative voters. In the summer of 2024, Hubert Cichocki, senator Kazimierz Michał Ujazdowski, and Marek Tokarczyk and Jacek Wojnicki, among others, left the party. They resumed (in cooperation with Aleksander and Katarzyna Hall) the activities of the think tank "Centrum Dobrego Państwa".

== Deputies ==
Deputies were elected on the Polish Coalition and Civic Platform lists.

- Ireneusz Raś: leader of the party.
- Jacek Tomczak
- Radosław Lubczyk
- Kazimierz Michał Ujazdowski

== Ideology ==
The party has yet to provide a full ideological manifesto; however, it has been described by journalists as a party created by the Polish Coalition to attract young, conservative and patriotic voters who are dissatisfied with the then-current government's policies. The inaugural congress has been attended by Polish politicians including Aleksander Hall and former president Bronisław Komorowski.

== Structure ==
Leader:

- Ireneusz Raś

Vice-Leaders:

- Hubert Cichocki
- Radosław Lubczyk

Secretary:

- Michał Kwiecien

Treasurer:

- Piotr Kulerski

Chairman of the National Council:

- Kazimierz Michał Ujazdowski

Spokesman:

- Jan Popławski

== Election results ==
=== Sejm ===
| Election | Leader | Votes | % | Seats | +/– | Government |
|---|---|---|---|---|---|---|
| 2023 | Ireneusz Raś | 3,110,670 | 14.4 (#3) | 3 / 460 | New | PiS Minority (2023) |
| 2023 | Ireneusz Raś | 3,110,670 | 14.4 (#3) | 3 / 460 | New | KO–PL2050–KP–NL (2023–2026) |
| 2023 | Ireneusz Raś | 3,110,670 | 14.4 (#3) | 3 / 460 | New | KO–KP–NL–PL2050–C(2026–present) |
| 2023 | As part of the Third Way coalition, that won 65 seats in total. | | | | | |

=== Senate ===
| Election | Leader | Votes | % | Seats | +/– | Majority |
|---|---|---|---|---|---|---|
| 2023 | Ireneusz Raś | 2,462,360 | 11.5 | 1 / 100 | New | KO-PL2050-KP-NL |
| 2023 | As part of Third Way, which won 11 seats in total. | | | | | |

=== European Parliament ===
| Election | Leader | Votes | % | Seats | +/– | EP Group |
|---|---|---|---|---|---|---|
| 2024 | Ireneusz Raś | 813,238 | 6.91 (#4) | 0 / 53 | New | – |
| 2024 | As part of the Third Way coalition, that won 3 seats in total. | | | | | |
