= There is One Poland =

There is One Poland Polska Jest Jedna
- Abbreviation: PJJ
- Leader: Rafał Piech
- Founder: Rafał Piech
- Founded: 25 September 2021
- Registered: 9 February 2023
- Dissolved: 18 November 2024
- Ideology: Vaccine hesitancy Climate change denial Traditional Catholicism; Anti-abortion; Hard Euroscepticism
- Political position: Right-wing to far-right
- Religion: Roman Catholicism
- Colours: Blue; Red
- Slogan: "God, Family, Fatherland" (Polish: Bóg, Rodzina, Ojczyzna)
- Sejm: 0 / 460
- Senate: 0 / 100
- Regional assemblies: 1 / 552
- City presidents: 1 / 107

Website
- pjj.org.pl

There is One Poland (Polish: Polska Jest Jedna, PJJ) was a political party in Poland registered on 9 February 2023. It was based on an anti-COVID-19 restriction movement started in 2021 by the mayor of Siemianowice Śląskie, Rafał Piech. The party calls itself "the true right" and promotes climate change denial, the New World Order conspiracy theory, and opposes COVID-19 vaccines, calling the COVID-19 pandemic a "medical experiment".

Main proposals of the party include protecting traditional money and currency as one of the provisions of the Constitution of Poland, withdrawal from the European Union if it is not "prepared to cooperate for mutual benefit", making social security and vaccinations optional only, and construction of new coal mines and a gradual increase in coal mining. It was one of the seven nationwide committees for the 2023 Polish parliamentary election.

== History ==
The PJJ social movement has its origins in protests against the restrictions during COVID-19 pandemic. Among the founders, in addition to Rafał Piech, were Anna Siarkowska (MP of the PiS club), former MP Jan Łopuszański (President of Porozumienie Polskie), Zbigniew Hałat (former Deputy Minister of Health and Chief Sanitary Inspector), journalist Jan Pospieszalski and social activists Karolina Elbanowska and Tomasz Elbanowski. In early 2022, the PJJ association and foundation was established, but later put into liquidation. Later, in December 2022, a narrower group applied for registration of the political party, with Rafał Piech as chairman, Piotr Klein as 1st vice-chairman, Krzysztof Olszewski as 2nd vice-chairman and Jarosław Mirończuk as secretary. The court entered the party in the register of political parties on 9 February 2023. In June of the same year, a programme congress was held in Warsaw.

=== 2023 parliamentary elections ===
In the 2023 Polish parliamentary election, PJJ became one of seven nationwide committees. It registered lists in 39 out of 41 districts in the elections to the Sejm of the Republic of Poland, which included PJJ members and independent candidates, plus one member of the Polish People's Party. Party leader Rafał Piech opened the list in the Nowy Sącz district. Other candidates included a councillor from the Law and Justice party's club in the Kuyavian-Pomeranian Voivodeship Sejmik. Marek Hildebrandt (former Agreement activist) and Stanisław Gudzowski (former LPR MP). The grouping also fielded four candidates for the Senate of the Republic of Poland (including PiS MP Malgorzata Janowska, who belongs to the Republican Party).

In 2023, the party ran a radically right-wing campaign - its program included a demand that family gardens be sold with a 99 percent discount for Polish nationals; the year 1989 was described as "the time when the fourth partition of Poland began", and Poland was described as a colony of the "Western capital". PJJ heavily emphasized its slogan "God, family, homeland" and strongly attacked environmental proposals, arguing that Poland should continue to bet heavily on coal. The party denounced Confederation Liberty and Independence, a fellow far-right party, as too moderate and condemned its right-libertarianism. In the end, the party won 351.099 votes, or 1.63% of the popular vote. The party failed to gain any seats, and political commentators state that PJJ was one of the factors behind the electoral underperformance of Law and Justice and Confederation, as the party took votes exclusively from these parties.

== Election results ==
=== Sejm ===
Election	Votes	%	Seats	+/–	Government
2023	351.099	1.63 (#7)	0 / 460	New	Extra-parliamentary

=== Senate ===
Election	Votes	%	Seats	+/–	Government
2023	55.418	0.26 (#16)	0 / 100	New	Extra-parliamentary

=== European Parliament ===
Election	Leader	Votes	%	Seats	+/–	EP Group
2024	Rafał Piech	1,420,287	12.08% (#3)	0 / 53	New	–
2024	As part of the Confederation coalition, that won 6 seats in total.					

== Program ==
There is One Poland used the slogan "God, Family, Homeland". The party's ideological tenets were based on the defence of national and social conservative values. The party focused on four areas: policies for entrepreneurs, agriculture, energy and the rights of disabled people. Among other things, it proposed a voluntary Social Security program for entrepreneurs for a period of three years and making health contributions dependent on income. In agriculture, the party supported deregulation and the extension of free market principles for local food producers, as well as the promotion of Polish food and appropriate labelling. In energy, it advocated the preservation of coal-based and geothermal energy. The party also wanted to see an increase in the nursing allowance and benefit, and for carers of disabled people to be able to work. It stressed that Polish membership in the European Union must be conditional, and maintained only if it brings beneficial cooperation.

Calling itself "the true right", the party bringed together conservative voters and "orphans of PiS", former PiS voters then disillusioned with the party. There is One Poland closely identified with Traditional Catholicism and was even called 'ultra-Catholic'. The party also opposed LGBT rights, declaring that "any relationship is only between a man and a woman". It also rejected climate change, and considered the World Health Organization a hoax. There is One Poland also believed in the New World Order conspiracy theory, stating that it has to be stopped and replaced with what the party calls "Divine World Order" (Polish: Boży Porządek Świata).

== Leadership ==
President:

- Rafał Piech

First Vice-President:

- Piotr Klein

Second Vice-President:

- Krzysztof Olszewski

Party board members

- Izabela Pałgan
- Jarosław Mirończuk
- Monika Więcek

== See also ==
- Kukiz'15
- Confederation Liberty and Independence
- National Movement (Poland)
- Confederation of the Polish Crown
- United Right
