= Adam Wielomski =

Polish historian of political thought (born 1972)

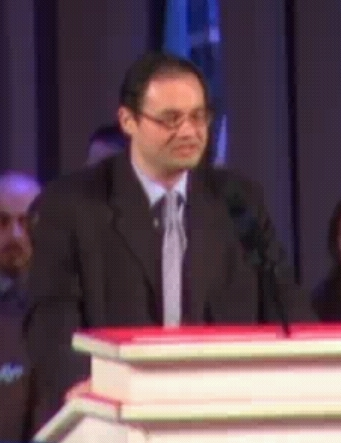
- Wielomski in 2011
- Born: December 25, 1972 (age 53)
- Spouse: Magdalena Ziętek-Wielomska

Academic background
- Education: University of Warsaw
- Influences: Suárez; Maistre; Bonald; Donoso Cortés; Koneczny; Dmowski; Maurras; Schmitt

Academic work
- Discipline: Political science
- Sub-discipline: Political history
- School or tradition: Traditional Catholicism; Traditionalist conservatism
- Institutions: Cardinal Stefan Wyszyński University in Warsaw
- Main interests: History of political thought, criticisms of globalization
- Website: www.provitabona.pl

Adam Wielomski (born December 25, 1972) is a Polish political scientist and author, since 2016 professor of the history of political thought at Stefan Wyszyński University Warsaw. He is an expert on both Romance and German intellectual tradition being associated with right-wing political interest. Wielomski is a scholar of modern nationalisms as well as pre-modern ideas, known for the thematic breadth and volume of his work. Besides that, he is involved in metapolitics, podcasting and has been a political advisor.

== Background in academia and journalism ==
Until 2016, he lectured at the University of Natural Sciences and Humanities in Siedlce, where he taught in the Institute of Social Sciences and Security of the Faculty of Humanities. He hails from Warsaw. Throughout his career, Wielomski has been based at departments of law or political science rather than history, being a historian of ideas more than an empiricist, according to his own view. From the 1990s to the mid-2010s, he lectured at various private colleges as well. Later, he professed that back then, he perceived the post-communist transformation as something emphatically positive, being able to earn more money in a privatising education field, while his lawyer parents were prospering as legal counsel. Only due to his wife he got to know the economic malaise of post-industrial Poland, i.e. lower Silesia, and changed his orthodox free market views.

He gained a master's degree in 1995, PhD in 1998 (on Joseph de Maistre), habilitation in 2009 (on French nationalism) and the title professor in 2015.

Wielomski is the author and co-author of several books on Spanish and French counter-revolutionary political thought. Besides Romance intellectual history, one of his main topics is modern German political thought. For years, he has been working in Berlin State Library. He is an expert on Carl Schmitt. While he is ensconced in the former tradition, identifying himself as a Latinised occidental thinker, he is most critical towards German currents, and authored some polemics castigating Heidegger's and Nietzsche's anti-civilisational influence on German politics, both on the far left (postmodernism, 1968 movement) and violent far right, i.e. National Socialism.

Wielomski serves as editor-in-chief of the quarterly Pro Fide Rege et Lege, the magazine Nowoczesna Myśl Narodowa and is a columnist for Najwyższy Czas!. He is on the consultant board of a Polish journal on Thomism. He interviewed controversial figures such as Wojciech Jaruzelski and Marine Le Pen. Himself, he is a habitual interview partner as well as contributor of weekly Do Rzeczy.

== Societal activities ==
Under the AWS government, Wielomski served as an advisor and speechwriter to prime minister Jerzy Buzek from 1999 to 2001. Since 2004, he is the chairman of Klub Zachowawczo-Monarchistyczny (KZM, Conservative Monarchist Club), a right wing lobby group. He contributes most pieces for its portal Konserwatyzm.pl. As chairman of KZM, he participated in the foundation of the joint right radical party Confederation Liberty and Independence in late 2018 and after its split in early 2025, he retained close ties to the Confederation of the Polish Crown (KKP), yet declined in 2026 to run as a Sejm candidate of KKP in the 2027 election. Before, he had been a member of and at times counsellor to right-wing parties ZChN, Przyjmerze Prawicy and Janusz Korwin-Mikke's Unia Polityki Realnej, being short-time general secretary in the latter case. He then supported the Congress of the New Right.

Together with his philosopher wife, Magdalena Ziętek-Wielomska, he founded "Pro Vita Bona" in 2015, a think tank and publisher. Most of his popularizing books are published by this foundation. He uses X and has a YouTube channel called "Scholarly on politics", providing political comments, often polemics, as well as insights into his book projects and introductions into political thought and modern history. As of May 2026, the channel gathered about 50.000 followers. Together with journalist and lawyer K. Klimczak, in 2024 and 2025 he did a series with numerous episodes on Nazi occupation of Europe and Hitler's foreign allies, both Axis and collaboration. With France expert Kacper Kita, he did a cycle on French history and political thought. When Francisco Franco's 50th death anniversary came in 2025, he was a frequent speaker on the topic of Franquism. In his 2006 study on Franco's Spain, he had also pondered into the traditionalist antecedents of the regime. In 2026, he joined the chorus of various symphatizers of Narodowa Demokracja who rejected the political premises and consequences of the 1926 May Coup.

== Key positions and opponents ==
Wielomski identifies as a traditionalist Catholic and conservative and objects to the rising affiliation of traditionalism in Poland with racialist currents, i.e. neopaganism and Evolian thought. Also, he spoke out against ethno-nationalism as a Catholic. In 2026, Wielomski went as far as stating that nationalism without ethical (i.e. Catholic Christian) underpinnings is mere evil. Furthermore, he took a firm stance against the generic "traditionalist school" (Guenon among others) and expressed scepticism over Russian continuator Alexander Dugin, whom he singled out as an eclectic with a dubious biography consistent only in his anti-Western views. For several years, Wielomski has been the main opponent of misogynistic tendencies within the Polish radical right.

=== State and church ===
He is a proponent of the nation state, in opposition to prof. Jacek Bartyzel, who advocates for more ancient, supranational polities and doesn't share Wielomski objections to Germany. Although they share many research interests and at times collaborated, Bartyzel is considered his main rival among Polish conservative thinkers. Bartyzel accused him of an instrumental approach to religion. Wielomski's both frequent and nonchalant use of the term katechon has triggered irritatation. Although he first welcomed the election of Pope Francis, he later criticized him severely for his liberal stance on ethno-religious elements overseas, hinting, on the other hand, at the pope's displeasure with the tridentine mass. He dissented, among various aspects, the ecumenical processes in John Paul's (II.) pontificate and had it that the now Pope Leo had been a theologian who carefully concealed his views for years, perceiving him as continuator of a liberal trajectory. Already in the 2000s, he maintained that "ultramontanism is dead". At the same time, Wielomski has frequently spoken out against sedevacantism, ostracizing it as "crazy", "Occamish" and individualistic.

Following the excommunication of the Society of Saint Pius X after the 2026 Écône consecrations, he expressed a moderate position, sketching a future way to reconciliation.

=== Economy and politics ===
Economically, Wielomski proposes a model broadly on ordoliberal lines, adding some limited protectionism. He has been critical towards both Polish libertarianism and recent statism. He is inimical to Prawo i Sprawiedliwość and Mateusz Morawiecki, whom he perceives to be an agent of international powers. He castigates party and cadre for their alleged Piłsudskiite or Sanacja characteristics, i.e. cult of leader (Jarosław Kaczyński), feigned religiosity, etatism and a mislead, one-directional foreign policy, nowadays being servile to the US. By some media, the less than solemn circumstances of his inauguration as professor during Andrzej Dudas first presidential term were perceived as retribution for his stance. Wielomski's critical stance on ethno-nationalism has led him to oppose the engagement of PiS politicians like Ryszard Legutko with Israeli political figures such as Yoram Hazony. Among 145 lecturers, in 2018 he signed an open letter protesting the university sector reforms under Jarosław Gowin. As regards the ongoing Polish Constitutional Tribunal crisis, after the clashes in fall 2026 he stated that both parties had acted unconstitutional, reproaching president Nawrocki for not swearing in the Tusk government's judge candidates, and them for taking part in alternative ceremonies at Sejm speaker Czarzasty's request. He had hinted at systemic consequences already in 2016.

Wielomski is aligned to the tradition of Narodowa Demokracja and cooperates with its current adherents, such as Ruch Narodowy. When Konfederacja was founded in 2018/19, he called for full endorsement of this synthetical ideology, stating that the new heterogeneous party should adopt national liberal as an overarching moniker. Left-wing media have portrayed Wielomski as part of a network being friendly to Russia, centered on Grzegorz Braun. As far as it concerns foreign policy, he eulogized Viktor Orban, whom he called a master of multipolarity.

He advocates deeper ties of Poland to China and had been invited to a New Silk Road conference in Zhengzhou in August 2026. To him, the 2017 decision of the PiS government (i.e. Macierewicz) to object to projecting the main trajectory of China's strategic enterprise trough Poland (instead of Hungary) was a missed opportunity. He maintains that it would have totally changed Poland's international position to the better.

=== Axiology ===
From the 2010s onwards, Wielomski advocated a "conservatism of the 21th century", perceiving monarchism as an intellectual undercurrent more than a political aim, again contradicting the more fundamentalist Bartyzel who runs a separate association, Organizacja Monarchistów Polskich. Under his guidance, the conservative monarchist club replicated such a reformed view, striving for cultural influence in more broader circles. During this phase, Wielomski has turned from an embracement of elitism towards national populism on French lines, discerning leftish roots of the Front Nationals programme. Due to his willingness to discourse with heterodox left-wingers and apology of the national state, he is criticized by Polish adherents of paleoconservatism, paleolibertarianism and Austrian economics, sometimes being labeled an exponent of a national left. He is notorious for having made some positive remarks on Wojciech Jaruzelski and is a fierce critic of Solidarność and aligned political movements in Poland's Third Republic, arguing that a purge of this old-fashioned political class would be vital for a more independent and balanced public policy. For the Polish elites, he coined the label "elitka infantylno-agenturalna", pointing at their purported parochialism, naïveté and servility.

Himself being a staunch anti-liberal, he feuded for more than a decade with the Poznań liberal historian Piotr Napierała, a former collaborator at his portal Konserwatyzm.pl, who failed habilitation and now is a popular Polish internet personality in edutainment. Since the advent of the Corona pandemic in 2020, Wielomski has come forth with various rebuttals of "globalism", aiming chiefly at Klaus Schwab and Yuval Noah Harari, sometimes in co-authorship with his wife. Ziętek-Wielomska, who is also a lawyer, has run for Confederacy in the 2019 parliamentary elections. Although she now shares her husband's criticism towards globalization and Germany, she did parts of her Master studies and obtained a PhD degree there and took several grants of German institutions.

== Bibliography ==
=== English ===
- The Europe of Nations and Its Future: Nationalism, Euroscepticism, Natiocratism (co-authored with Magdalena Ziętek-Wielomska), Towarzystwo Naukowe Myśli Politycznej i Prawnej, Warszawa 2017, ISBN 8392716663

=== Polish ===
- Od grzechu do apokatastasis. Historiozofia Josepha de Maistre, Instytut Liberalno-Konserwatywny, Lublin 1999, ISBN 9788390228280
- Filozofia polityczna francuskiego tradycjonalizmu 1796-1830, Wydawnictwo Arcana, Kraków 2003, ISBN 83-89243-70-9
- Hiszpania Franco: źródła i istota doktryny politycznej, Wydawnictwo ARTE, Biała Podlaska 2006, ISBN 9788360673089
- Dekalog konserwatysty, Wydawnictwo Megas, Warszawa 2006, ISBN 9788390141350
- Encyklopedia polityczna, tom 1 (co-authored with Jacek Bartyzel i Bogdan Szlachta), Polskie Wydawnictwo Encyklopedyczne, Radom 2007, ISBN 8389862956
- Kontrrewolucja, której nie było, Wydawnictwo Megas, Warszawa 2007, ISBN 9788390141398
- Konserwatyzm: główne idee, nurty i postacie, Fijorr Publishing, Warszawa 2007, ISBN 9788389812438
- Nacjonalizm francuski 1886-1940: geneza, przemiany i istota filozofii politycznej, Von Borowiecky, Warszawa 2007, ISBN 9788387689933
- Lech Kaczyński w Tbilisi (co-authored with Jan Engelgard), Wydawnictwo Prasy Lokalnej, Warszawa 2008, ISBN 9788392528418
- Prawa człowieka i ich krytyka: przyczynek do studiów o ideologii czasów ponowożytnych (co-authored with Paweł Bała), Fijorr Publishing, Warszawa 2008, ISBN 9788389812131
- Carl Schmitt a Konstytucja Rzeczypospolitej Polskiej: studium przypadku ratyfikacji Traktatu lizbońskiego - rola Prezydenta RP (co-authored with Paweł Bała), Klub Zachowawczo-Monarchistyczny, Warszawa 2008, ISBN 9788360745113
- Kościół w cieniu gilotyny: Katolicyzm francuski wobec rewolucji, Von Borowiecky, Warszawa 2009
- Krytyce demokracji (co-authored with Cezary Kalita), Wydawnictwo ARTE, Warszawa 2009, ISBN 9788361938125
- Konserwatyzm – między Atenami a Jerozolimą. Szkice post-awerroistyczne, Fijorr Publishing, Warszawa 2009, ISBN 978-83-89812-57-5
- Wstęp do nauki o państwie, prawie i polityce (co-authored with Paweł Bała), Wydawnictwo ARTE, Warszawa 2010, ISBN 978-83-619-3840-8
- Faszyzmy łacińskie. Sen o rewolucji innej niż w Rosji i w Niemczech, Wydawnictwo ARTE, Warszawa 2011, ISBN 978-83-61938-37-8
- Teokracja papieska 1073-1378. Myśl polityczna papieży, papalistów i ich przeciwników, Von Borowiecky, Warszawa 2011, ISBN 978-83-60748-23-7
- Antologia Zbrodni Smoleńskiej (co-authored with Jan Engelgard i Maciej Motas), Wydawnictwo ARTE, Warszawa 2011, ISBN 9788361938323
- Prawica w XX wieku, tom I, Von Borowiecky, Warszawa 2013, ISBN 9788360748411
- System Polityczny, prawo i konstytucja Królestwa Polskiego 1815-1830 (co-authored with Lech Mażewski i Jacek Bartyzel), Von Borowiecky, Warszawa 2013, ISBN 9788360748428
- Stepan Bandera w Kijowie. Kulisy rewolucji na Ukrainie (co-authored with Jan Engelgard i Arkadiusz Meller), Oficyna Wydawnicza Capital, Warszawa 2014, ISBN 9788364037856
- Od Christianitas do Unii Europejskiej. Historia idei zjednoczenia Europy (co-authored with Łukasz Święcicki), Towarzystwo Naukowe Myśli Politycznej i Prawnej, Warszawa 2015, ISBN 9788392716693
- Niemiecka myśl polityczna wobec narodowego socjalizmu (co-authored with Łukasz Święcicki i Jaromir Ćwikła), Klub Zachowawczo-Monarchistyczny, Warszawa 2016, ISBN 9788392716686
- W poszukiwaniu Katechona. Teologia polityczna Carla Schmitta, Von Borowiecky, Warszawa 2016
- Prawica w XX wieku, tom 2, Von Borowiecky, Radzymin 2017, ISBN 9788365806130
- Nowoczesność, nacjonalizm, naród europejski: dylematy samoidentyfikacji Europejczyków (co-authored with Magdalena Ziętek-Wielomska), Towarzystwo Naukowe Myśli Politycznej i Prawnej, Warszawa 2017, ISBN 9788394937119
- Chrześcijaństwo i Europa wobec sekularyzacji. Religia w niemieckiej myśli politycznej XX wieku (co-authored with Łukasz Święcicki), Towarzystwo Naukowe Myśli Politycznej i Prawnej, Warszawa 2018, ISBN 9788394937126
- Nacjonalizm wobec problemu Europy, Klub Zachowawczo-Monarchistyczny, Warszawa 2018, ISBN 978-83-949371-3-3
- Katolik – Prusak – nazista. Sekularyzacja w biografii politycznej Carla Schmitta, Von Borowiecky, Warszawa 2019, ISBN 978-83-658-0644-4
- Państwo narodowe i jego wrogowie (co-authored with Magdalena Ziętek-Wielomska), Fundacja Pro Vita Bona, Warszawa 2020.
- Sojusz ekstremów w epoce globalizacji. Jak neoliberałowie i neomarksiści budują nam nowy świat, Fundacja Pro Vita Bona, Warszawa 2021.
- Zabójcy Zachodu. Prawica i lewica nietzscheańsko-heideggerystyczna, Fundacja Pro Vita Bona, Warszawa 2022.
- Demokracja nieliberalna, Szkoła Wyższa Wymiaru Sprawiedliwości, Warszawa 2022.
- Praworządność, Szkoła Wyższa Wymiaru Sprawiedliwości, Warszawa 2022 (with A. Barut).
- Yuval Noah Harari. Grabarz człowieczeństwa, Fundacja Pro Vita Bona, Warszawa 2022.
- Konserwatyzm Ezoteryczny, Fundacja Pro Vita Bona, Warszawa 2023, ISBN 9788396662453.
- Imperialna Europa. Niemieckie plany podboju i reorganizacji Europy 1871-1945, Fundacja Pro Vita Bona, Warszawa 2024.
- Imperium rationis. Państwo suwerenne w zachodniej myśli politycznej XVI i XVII stulecia, Fundacja Pro Vita Bona, Warszawa 2024.
- Myśl polityczna reformacji i kontrreformacji. Tom II – Sobór Trydencki i reforma katolicka, Fundacja Pro Vita Bona, Wydawnictwo von Borowiecky, 2025, ISBN 978-83-68105-30-8.
- Papieże, cesarze i królowie. Średniowieczna geneza naszej polityki, Fundacja Pro Vita Bona, 2025, ISBN 978-83-971460-6-8.
- Dlaczego nie jestem liberałem? (Interview, with Kamil Klimczak), Fundacja Pro Vita Bona, Warszawa 2026, ISBN 978-83-971460-9-9.
- Kres hegemonii Zachodu. Narodziny świata wielobiegunowego 2022-2026, Fundacja Pro Vita Bona, 2026.
