= Ancestral Home =

Political party in Poland (2004–2005)

Ancestral Home Dom Ojczysty
- Abbreviation: DO
- Leader: Jerzy Robert Nowak; Piotr Krutul
- Registered: 3 April 2004
- Dissolved: 14 November 2005
- Split from: League of Polish Families
- Headquarters: ul. Janka Bytnara "Rudego" 23/18, 02-645 Warsaw
- Membership (2005): 335
- Ideology: National Catholicism; Sovereigntism; Protectionism; Hard Euroscepticism; Economic nationalism
- Political position: Right-wing
- Religion: Roman Catholic
- Colours: Red; White
- Sejm: 0 / 460
- Senate: 0 / 100
- European Parliament: 0 / 51
- Regional assemblies: 0 / 552
- City presidents: 0 / 117

The Ancestral Home (Polish: Dom Ojczysty, DO) was a nationalist political association and then a political party in Poland, founded on 3 April 2004 and disbanded on 14 November 2005. Initially founded by Jerzy Robert Nowak as a political association Nationwide Movement for the Defence of Polishness "Dom Ojczysty", it was soon reorganized into a political party, as a splinter of the far-right League of Polish Families (LPR). It was then led by Piotr Krutul, who left LPR together with a few other members of the Sejm. The party was founded to protest the decision of LPR leadership to participate in the 2004 European Parliament election in Poland, which it saw as betrayal of the party's nationalist and anti-EU principles. For the 2005 Polish parliamentary election, the party co-founded the Patriotic Movement (Polish: Ruch Patriotyczny) as an effort to unite National Catholic groupings, but ultimately decided to run independently. In the 2005 election, it registered electoral lists in half of the electoral districts and won 0.28% of the popular vote and no seats. It dissolved in November 2005.

The party was mainly oriented around opposition to the European Union, which Dom Ojczysty saw as devastating to Polish agriculture, as well as Polish economic sovereignty. Its main goal was to build a strong, sovereign Poland based on Christian values and empower the Catholic Church, goals which the party saw as mutually exclusive with entering the European Union. It presented the European Union as an organization dominated by large corporations that would then exploit Poland once it entered the European common market. The party proposed to organize a second referendum on joining the European Union in Poland. Apart from its vehement opposition to the European Union, the party promoted protectionism as well as sovereigntism, stressing the need to protect Polish industries and to maintain the ownership of the Polish economy in Polish hands.

== History ==
The party was registered as the Nationwide Movement for the Defence of Polishness "Dom Ojczysty" (Polish: Ogólnopolskie Ruch Obrony Polskości „Dom Ojczysty”), and its founding convention took place on 3 April 2004 in Stalowa Wola, its chairman being a publicist associated with Radio Maryja, Professor Jerzy Robert Nowak. Although it was originally intended to be a social movement modelled, according to the intentions of the founders, on the Solidarity Citizens' Committee, Fatherland House was registered as a political party on 23 November 2004.

The new formation was joined by a group of League of Polish Families (LPR) activists, including initially four MPs, who on 20 April 2004 formed a parliamentary circle (Polish: koło poselskie) in the Sejm. It consisted of Ewa Kantor, Piotr Krutul, Gertruda Szumska and Halina Szustak (as chairwoman). The split occurred against the background of a dispute over the 2004 European Parliament election in Poland, in which the League of Polish Families ran. Dom Ojczysty called for the elections to be boycotted.

In an interview with Gazeta Wyborcza, Piotr Krutul said that Dom Ojczysty was an initiative of Jerzy Robert Nowak, who is the founder of the 'Nationwide Movement for the Defence of Polishness "Dom Ojczysty". Krutul then applied for cooperation together with three others MPs of League of Polish Families. The new party stated that it looked forward to working with "everyone who cares about the future of Poland, but not in the EU. A strong, sovereign Poland".

Naming their reasons for leaving League of Polish Families and founding a competing party, Krutul and other defectors cited the "apodictic way of exercising power" by the League of Polish Families leadership, along with the decision of the party to participate in the elections to the European Parliament, which the Ancestral Home saw as a betrayal of the LPR's program and anti-EU stance. The leader of LPR, Roman Giertych defended his decision to participate in the Europarliament election, arguing that abstaining would mean giving up seats to pro-European parties. He called the new party an attempt to weaken LPR shortly before the election.

At the end of the term, the Dom Ojczysty parliamentary circle numbered ten MPs. In addition to the founders, its members included elected from the League of Polish Families MPs Grzegorz Górniak, Zofia Krasicka-Domka, Józef Skowyra and Stanisław Szyszkowski, as well as those elected on behalf of the far-left populist Self-Defence of the Republic of Poland Józef Laskowski and Piotr Smolana.

In May 2005, the party organized a demonstration in front of the Pomeranian Voivodeship Office in Gdańsk together with local fishermen, demanding that the Polish government abolish the 4.5-month 'closed period' for cod, threatening that if the government did not enter negotiations with the fishermen, the party would then blockade the Maritime Office in Gdynia. The party criticized the closed period regulation especially in the context of Poland joining the European Union, where most countries had shorter closed periods, thus further disempowering Polish fishermen. The demonstration was also joined by League of Polish Families. Ultimately, the Polish Fisheries Crisis Board signed an agreement in which it implemented monetary compensation for the closed cod period.

Prior to the 2005 Polish parliamentary election, Dom Ojczysty co-founded Patriotic Movement (Polish: Ruch Patriotyczny), which was an effort to unite all National Catholic parties and movements. Dom Ojczysty initially planned to run on the electoral lists of the Patriotic Movement, but ultimately decided to run independently. It registered its lists in 18 out of 41 electoral districts, failing to cross the 5% electoral threshold in the vote, winning 32 863 votes, i.e. 0.28% of valid votes. Dom Ojczysty also fielded 12 candidates for the Senate none of whom won a seat (the best result was achieved by Jerzy Robert Nowak - 44 984 votes in the Sejm Constituency no. 23.

Dom Ojczysty on 14 November 2005 was deleted from the register of political parties.

At the same time, an association called Dom Ojczysty (headed by Halina Szustak) was registered in 2002, which continues its activities.

== Electoral results ==
=== Sejm ===
Election year	# of votes	% of vote	# of overall seats won	+/–
2005	32,863	0.28 (#14)	0 / 460	New

=== Senate ===
Election year	# of votes	% of vote	# of overall seats won	+/–
2005	181,337	0.75 (#12)	0 / 100	New

== Ideology ==
Dom Ojczysty was a right-wing party, much like the party its members split from, League of Polish Families. The party stated that its goal was "to organise the Polish Nation: in defence of an independent and sovereign Poland, in defence of Christian values and in defence of the supremacy of the Polish Constitution over the EU Constitution". It was sovereigntist and strongly emphasized the need to maintain Polish sovereignty, especially in context of economic independence. It was also considered National Catholic, and was described as "extremely nationalistic". Dom Ojczysty members stated that they seek to ensure that the Polish Catholic Church is powerful and influential.

In regards to the Church, the party released a declaration in July 2004 which stated: "We will not allow the destruction of our Radio and Television by the enemies of God, the Church and Poland. We will take all legally permitted actions in defence of Father Tadeusz [Rydzyk] and the works created by him with God's help. We are sure that truth will always win!" Dom Ojczysty was also a co-founder of the Patriotic Movement, which described itself as a National Catholic movement and sought to unite all National Catholic parties under a single, electoral front. The party was often hosted on the broadcasts of Catholic Radio Maryja.

The main issue was the European Union. Dom Ojczysty was completely opposite to the membership of Poland in the European Union, arguing that unless the conditions of entry were to be radically revised, entering the European Union would mean great harm to Poland. The party was founded in protest of the LPR's decision to participate in the 2004 European Parliament election, with members of Dom Ojczysty considering a betrayal of the party's nationalist and anti-EU values. One of the aims of the party was to call a second referendum on Polish entrance to the European Union.

The party was also protectionist, especially in regards to agrarian issue, as it considered Polish agriculture to be particularly threatened by the policies of the European Union. Dom Ojczysty argued that the EU subsidies to Polish farmers are only a partial compensation to the real cost of entering the European Union, and that they fail to compensate the long-term decline of Polish farming that the EU causes.

Dom Ojczysty argued that Poland will be treated as an inferior client state in trade relations of the European Union, stating that Poles would "become mere subcontractors for the big giants", with potential profits being exported away from Poland and to foreign large corporations. The party also warned against unfair competition and inequality within the European Union, pointing to the Irish membership in the EU despite Ireland being considered a tax haven, with which other EU members had to compete. It also stated that entering the EU means that Poland would lose its monetary independence, and that foreigners would be easily able to buy and own Polish land, dislocating Polish owners.
