= Jerzy Robert Nowak =

Polish historian and columnist

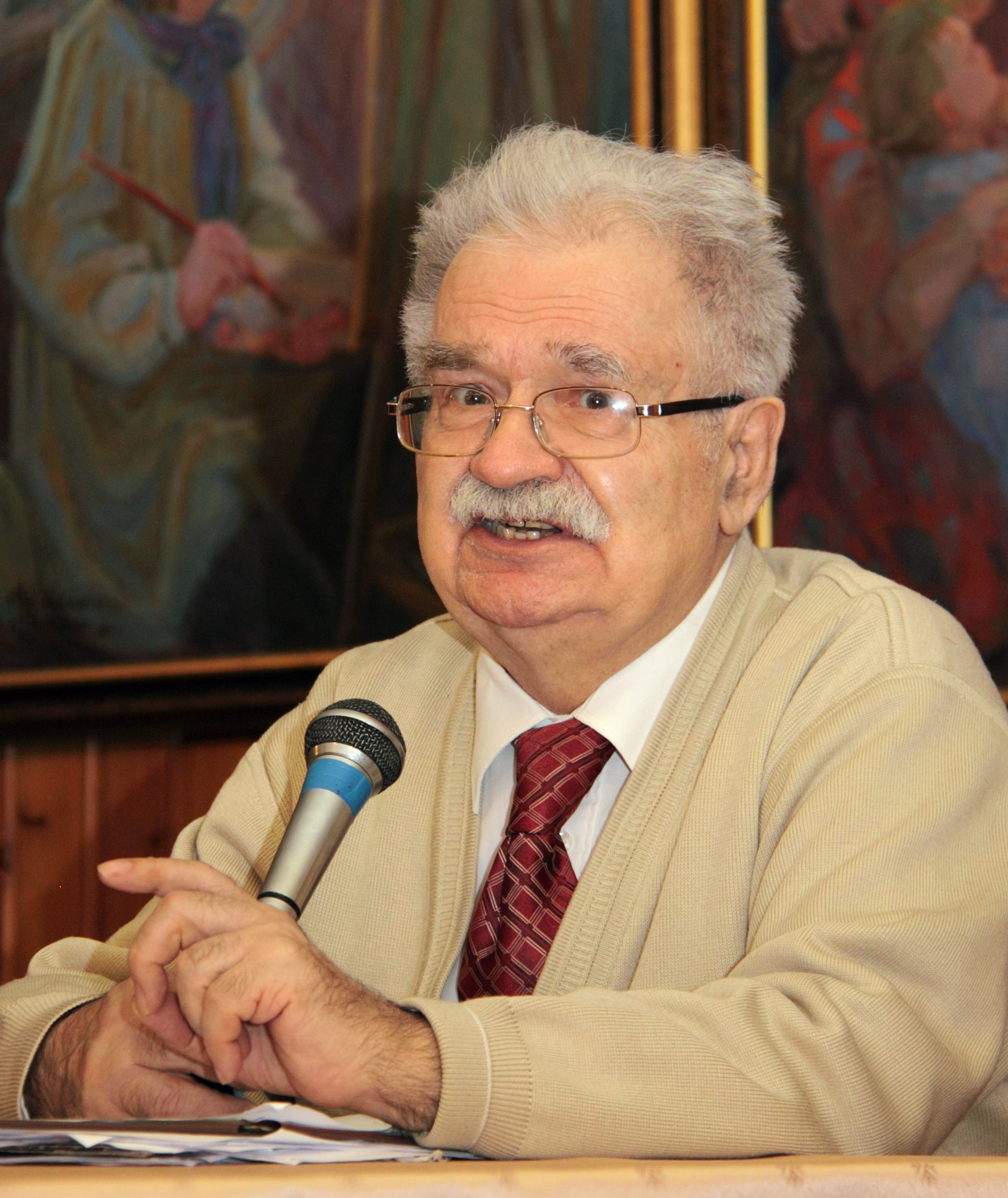
Jerzy Robert Nowak, lecture in the auditorium of the parish of St. Brother Albert, Kraków, 2013

Jerzy Robert Nowak (born 8 September 1940) is a Polish historian, and former columnist in right-wing Catholic media outlets including Nasz Dziennik, Telewizja Trwam, Radio Maryja.

== Biography ==
Nowak was born on 8 September 1940 in Terespol. He worked in Polish Institute of International Affairs, he was an expert in Hungarian matters, has published a number of books about Hungary. He worked in embassy of Poland in Budapest. He was an activist of Alliance of Democrats (Poland). He criticized The X-s, a historical novel by György Spiró.

He has been accused of antisemitism by various intellectuals as well as by the Polish Club of Catholic Intelligentsia and some Catholic clerics (including Archbishop Józef Życiński). In lectures to Catholic parishes throughout Poland, Nowak as spoken on the "threat of the Jews and masons". In his writings, Nowak has promoted the Judeopolonia conspiracy theory.

During the debate in Poland on the Polish role in the Jedwabne pogrom, Nowak, writing in Nasz Dziennik, dismissed Jan T. Gross as "the usual propaganda to get out of the Polish government money for the crimes committed in Poland by Germans, Soviets and criminals". Nowak argued against any acceptance of guilt by Poles, and expressed his (extreme) view that Jews should ask Poles for forgiveness over their "anti-Polish lies" and other "misdeeds". He wrote a book in Polish "100 kłamstw J.T. Grossa o żydowskich sąsiadach i Jedwabnem" ("100 lies of J.T. Gross about Jewish neighbors and Jedwabne.")

Following the publication of Gross's Fear: Anti-Semitism in Poland after Auschwitz, Nowak went on a lecture tour to focusing on what he referred to as Gross's "lies" and wrote aggressive newspaper columns.
