= Jakub Kulesza =

Polish politician

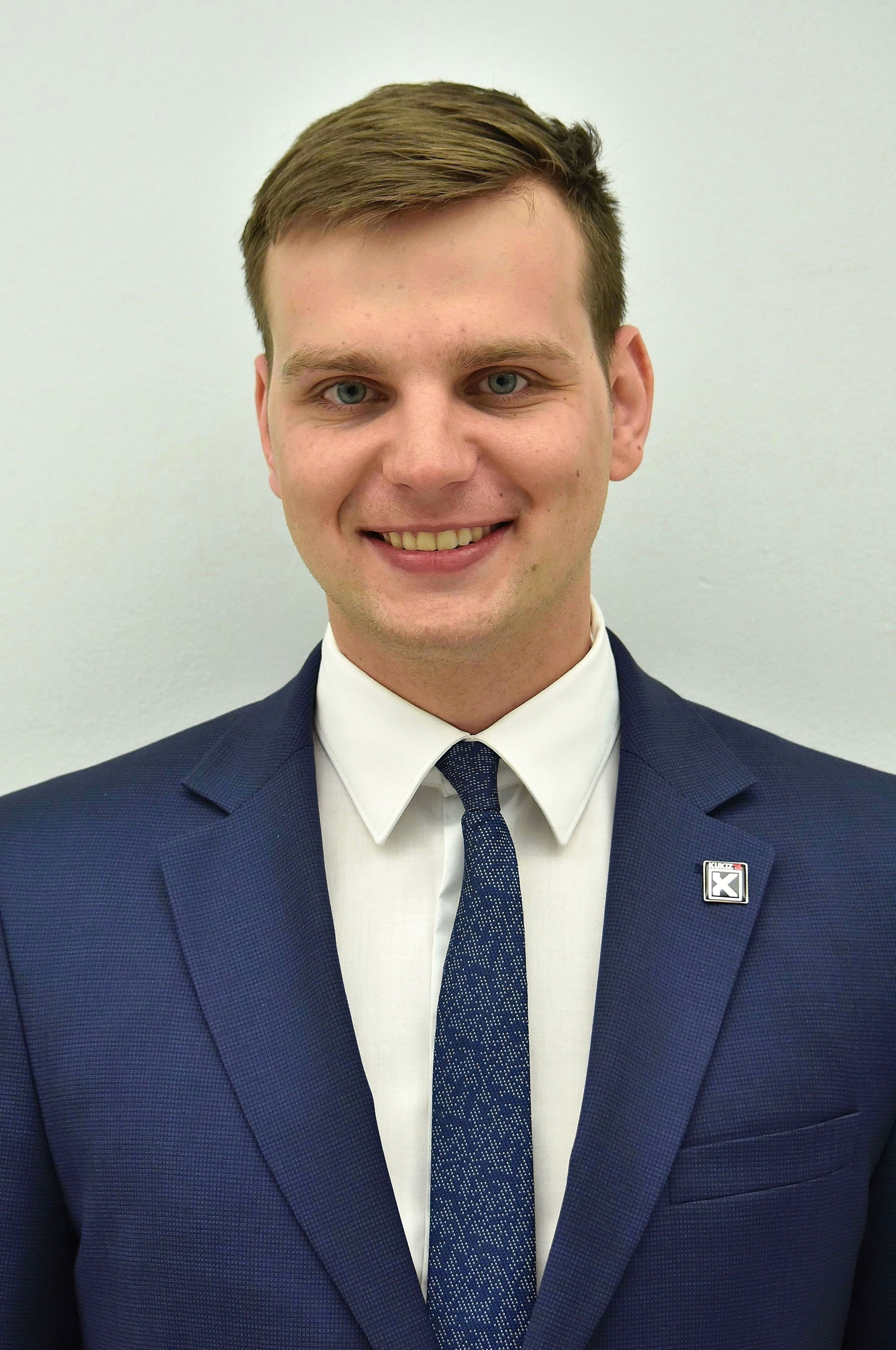

Member of the Sejm
- In office 25 October 2015 – 12 November 2023

Personal details
- Born: 12 November 1990 (age 35) Lublin, Poland
- Party: Wolnościowcy
- Education: Warsaw University of Technology
- Profession: Politician
- Website: kulesza.pl

Jakub Kulesza (born 12 November 1990) is a Polish politician and a former Member of Parliament.

Kulesza studied electronics, computer science and telecommunications at the Warsaw University of Technology. He was employed in enterprise computing. Kulesza organized the youth wing of the Real Politics Union, which operated until 2009. Since 2010, he is associated with KoLiber, serving as president from 2012 to 2013. He was also president of the Progressive Foundation.

In the parliamentary elections in 2015, Kulesza ran for the Sejm in the Lublin district as leader of the Kukiz'15 list. He was elected with 15,058 votes. Kulesza was the spokesman for the Kukiz'15 parliamentary caucus. In October 2018, he resigned from the position and became a member of Janusz Korwin-Mikke's political party, Liberty. This allowed him to get reelected in 2019.

In 2022, he was one of the 3 Confederation MPs to leave the KORWiN coalition due to its stance on Russia. Their new party is called Wolnościowcy.

== Personal life ==
Kulesza is married with Katarzyna; they have two sons: Leszek and Janusz.
