= Bolesław Witczak =

President of the Real Politics Union
- In office 2008–2010
- Preceded by: Stanisław Żółtek (acting chairman)
- Succeeded by: Bartosz Józwiak

Personal details
- Born: 1966 (age 59–60) Szamotuły, Poland
- Party: Real Politics Union

Bolesław Witczak (born 8 March 1966 in Szamotuły) is a Polish politician, engineer of logistics and entrepreneur.

== Career ==
In 1981, he graduated from trade school and then in 1988 became alumnus of Wood Technology School in Poznań. In the years 2001–2005 he studied at the logistics faculty of the High School of Communication and Management in Poznań. In the years 2001–2005, he studied at the logistics faculty of the School of Communication and Management in Poznań.

In 1992, he established the section of the Polish political party Real Politics Union (Unia Polityki Realnej, in short UPR) in his hometown Szamotuły. He took part in the 2007 Polish parliamentary election as part of the Janusz Korwin-Mikke Platform, a short-lived satellite party of the UPR. In the 2007 Polish parliamentary election, he was a candidate for the League of Polish Families list in Piła district. On 5 November 2007, he became the president of the UPR section in Greater Poland Voivodeship.

On 7 June 2008, he was appointed as president of Real Politics Union. On 9 January 2010, Magdalena Kocik was elected as the new president of the party, but in September the same year the National Court decided the election to be invalid, leaving Witczak on the record as president of the UPR. On 19 February 2011, Bartosz Józwiak was elected as his successor.

Witczak is married since 1996 and has two sons, Antoni and Jan.
