= Tadeusz Pieronek =

Polish Catholic bishop and theology professor (1934–2018)

His Excellency Tadeusz Pieronek
- Auxiliary Bishop Emeritus of Sosnowiec
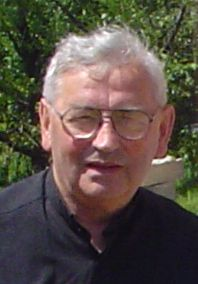
- Diocese: Sosnowiec
- Appointed: 25 Mar 1992
- Retired: 31 Aug 1998
- Successor: Piotr Skucha
- Other post: Titular Bishop of Cufruta (1992–2018)

Orders
- Ordination: 26 October 1957 by Archbishop Eugeniusz Baziak
- Consecration: 26 Apr 1992 by Pope John Paul II, Cardinal Franciszek Macharski, Cardinal Angelo Sodano

Personal details
- Born: 24 October 1934 Radziechowy, Second Polish Republic
- Died: 27 December 2018 (aged 84) Kraków, Poland
- Buried: Saints Peter and Paul Church, Kraków
- Denomination: Roman Catholic
- Occupation: Academic
- Education: Pontifical Lateran University

Tadeusz Pieronek (pronounced [taˈdɛ.uʂ pjɛˈrɔnɛk]; 24 October 1934 – 27 December 2018) was a Polish Roman Catholic auxiliary bishop-emeritus, Catholic academic and professor of theology and civil law. Pieronek was a leading member of the Stefan Batory Foundation (a George Soros Foundation branch in Poland).

== Biography ==
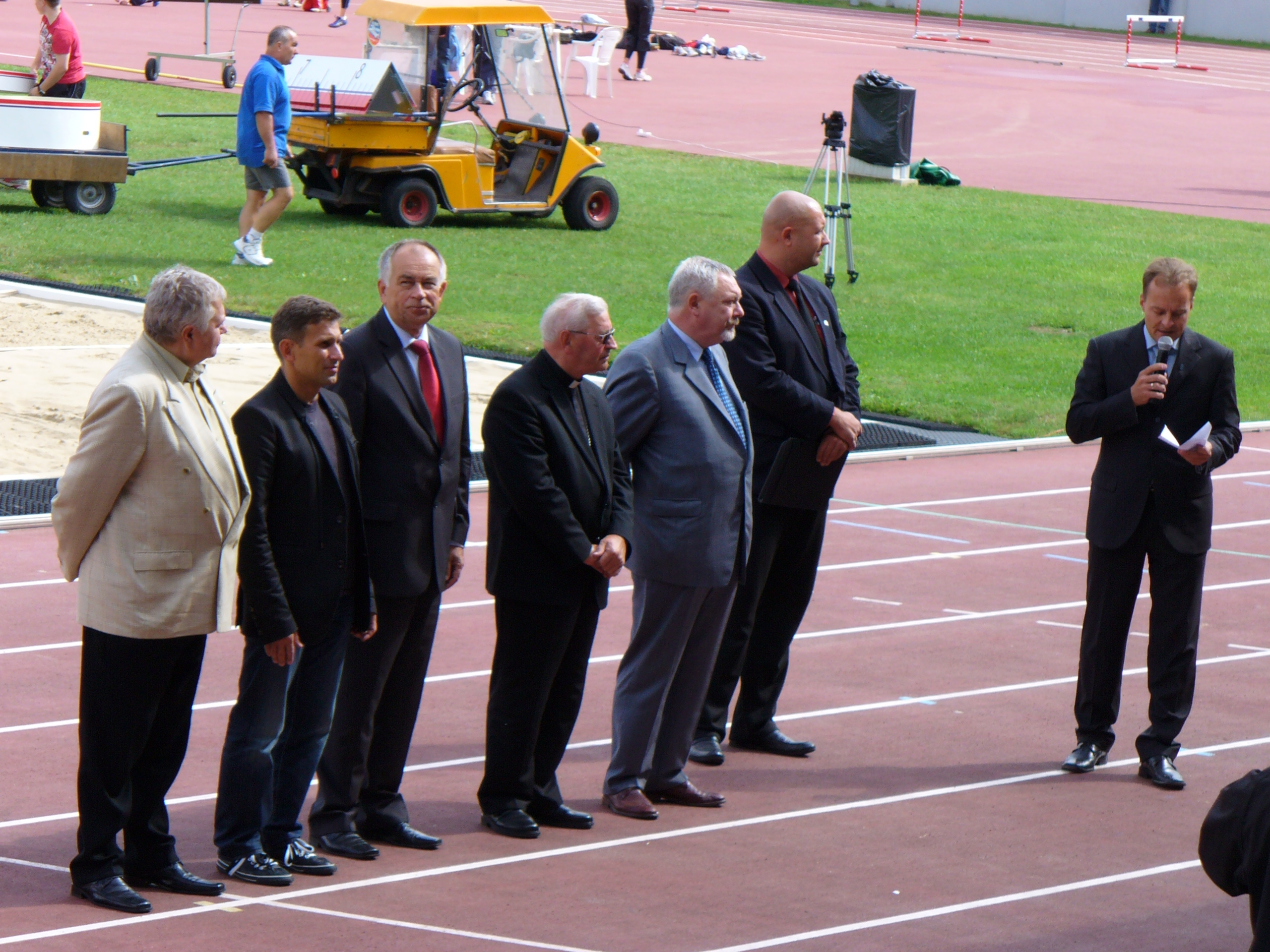
Bishop Pieronek (centre in Roman collar) as a member of the Athletics Honorary Committee in Poland.

Pieronek was born to Polish parents in the Żywiec Beskids village of Radziechowy in interbellum Poland. Ordained a priest in 1957 under the communist regime, from 1951 to 1954 he studied at the Theological Faculty of the Jagiellonian University in Kraków, then after its dissolution by the Communist government at the major seminary of the archdiocese of Kraków, from 1956 until 1960 at the Faculty of Canon Law at the Catholic University of Lublin. From 1961 until 1965 he studied in Rome at the Pontifical Lateran University, specializing in civil law as well as canon law. He received his doctorate in 1975, and was appointed theology professor in 1987.

He was auxiliary bishop of the Diocese of Sosnowiec from 1992 to 1998. From 1993 until 1998 he was secretary-general of the Polish bishops' conference. In 1998 he resigned his post after Piotr Libera was elected bishop and Pieronek was appointed titular bishop of Cufruta. From 1998 to 2004 he was rector of the Pontifical Academy of Theology. In 2007 he celebrated his 50th priestly anniversary with Cardinal Stanislaw Dziwisz in his residence in Kraków. In 2008, Pieronek received the Jan Karski Eagle Award to honour Pieronek's combat for tolerance and his efforts to fight against the "extremism" and alleged "antisemitic tendencies" of Radio Maryja, led by Redemptorist Father Tadeusz Rydzyk C.Ss.R. In his later years, Pieronek supported the social project of the Children's Hospice "Father Józef Tischner" in the city of Kraków. Bishop Pieronek supported the work of the Open Society Institute of George Soros.

In an interview in 2010, Pieronek claimed that Jews and the state of Israel "exploit" the Holocaust, which he labelled as such a "Jewish invention", but a crime he did not statistically or historically deny. Furthermore, Pieronek stated that the suffering of people at the hands of Nazis and in concentration camps was "not exclusively Jewish", pointing to Polish prisoners and treatment of Catholic priests by Nazi authorities. In the interview he said that recent Israeli and Jewish claims that Poland is antisemitic and might consider reparation payments to Jewish Holocaust survivors, were calumnious, ridiculous and a falsification of the complex history of Polish society; simultaneously Pieronek stated, that western and U.S. media and politics are dominated by Jews. The Anti-Defamation League (ADL) criticized Pieronek's statement. On January 26, bishop Pieronek stated, that his statements had been taken out of context and totally misunderstood.

Pieronek died on 27 December 2018 in Kraków.
