= Stanisław Michalkiewicz =

Polish politician (born 1947)

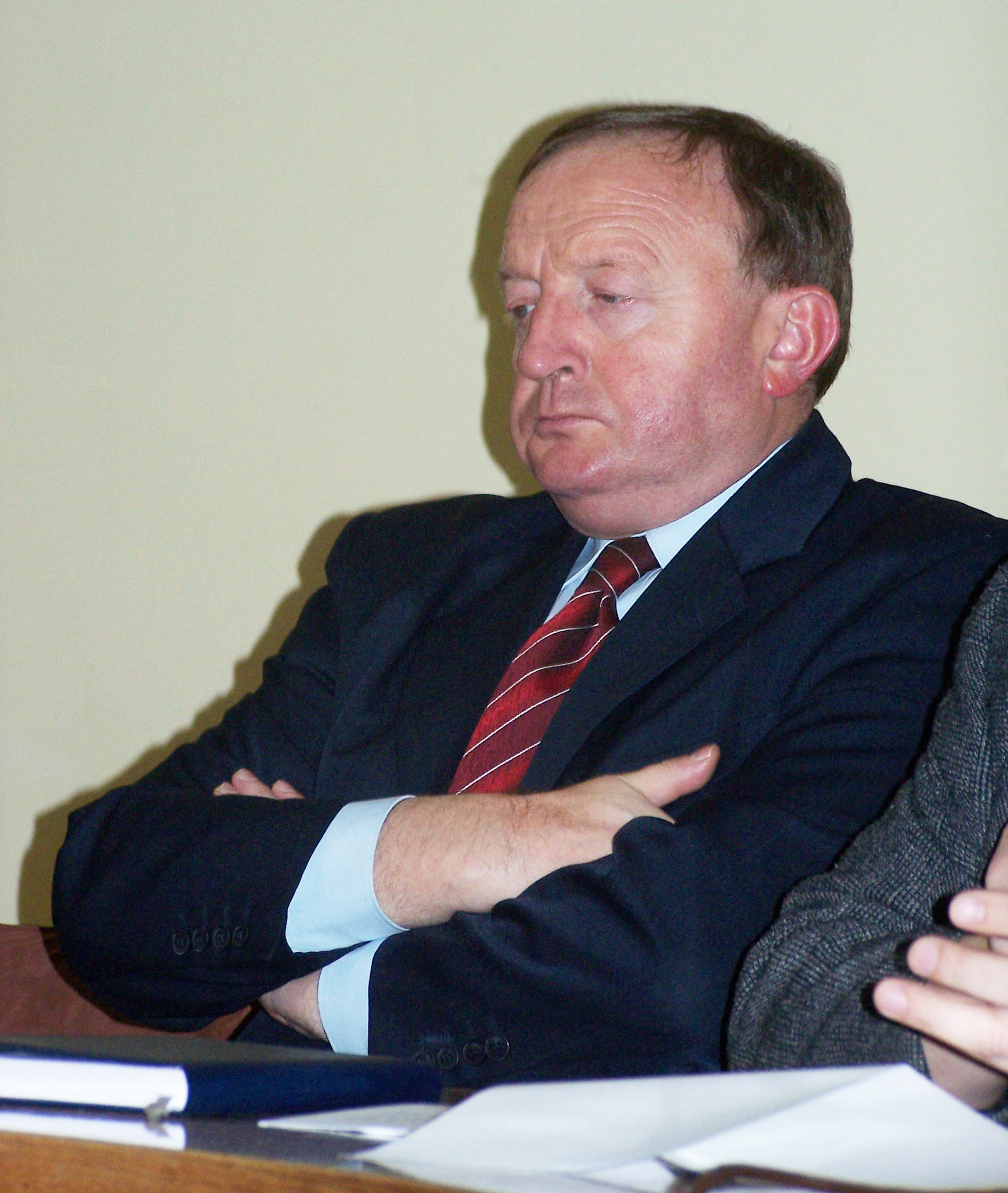
- Michalkiewicz, 2007

Personal details
- Born: November 8, 1947 (age 78) Lublin, Poland
- Party: Independent
- Other political affiliations: Real Politics Union (until 2009)
- Occupation: Publicist
- Religion: Roman Catholic
- Website: michalkiewicz.pl

Stanisław Andrzej Michalkiewicz (born 8 November 1947 in Lublin) is a Polish right-wing political commentator, lawyer, former politician, opposition activist in the communist Polish People's Republic, and book author.

== Career ==
Michalkiewicz graduated in 1969 from Maria Curie-Skłodowska University with a law degree. In 1972 he completed postgraduate studies at the University of Warsaw. In 1987 he co-founded Ruch Polityki Realnej which subsequently transformed into the Real Politics Union. Following the collapse of Communism, between 1991 and 1993, he served as a judge at the State Tribunal of the Republic of Poland. He served as the Chairman (1997–1999) and Vice-Chairman (2004 to 18 April 2005) of Real Politics Union.

== Publicist ==
Michalkiewicz is the author of political columns and articles published in far-right and right-wing newspapers and magazines such as Najwyższy Czas!, Powściągliwość i Praca, Nasza Polska, Nasz Dziennik, Gazeta Polska, Dziennik Polski, Niezależna Gazeta Polska, Goniec and others. He has published several sociopolitical books. His feature articles were transmitted in 2006-2013 by Polskie Radio Program I (Polish Radio One). He also began to work then for Radio Maryja and TV channel Telewizja Trwam.

On 27 March 2006 speaking on Radio Maryja, he made antisemitic remarks when he said that "Jews are trying to force a ransom from our government which they covertly call restitution". Michalkiewicz also said the country was being "humiliated" by Jews "at the site of the former death camp Auschwitz" and in April, 2006, was reported in Gazeta Wyborcza as stating that "men from Judea ... are trying to surprise us from behind", and referring to the World Jewish Congress as "a main firm in the Holocaust Industry". Michalkiewicz responded by calling Gazeta Wyborcza "an unusual example of the Jewish fifth column in Poland" and "a Jewish newspaper for Poles". He was investigated by prosecutors for "publicly insulting members of the population due to their nationality". However, in September 2006 prosecutors dropped the charges as while Michalkiewicz belittled the facts of the Holocaust he was not criminally culpable for denying Nazi crimes. Following the Michalkiewicz affair, the Vatican expressed its deep concern and urged Polish bishops to take action to keep the station under control.

In 2011, Michalkiewicz, known for supporting the Catholic Radio Maryja, condemned the MP Jan Filip Libicki for his "ultra-Catholicism" on the pages of the radical right-wing website "Nowy Ekran", followed by offensive statements about the religion. The anti-Catholic message was distinguished by the editors of Idź pod prąd (Go against the Current), a journal combining ultra-right views with aversion to Catholicism. Such and similar offensive remarks towards Catholics, and also Jews are characteristic of Michalkiewicz's statements. Michalkiewicz publicly promotes antisemitic conspiracy myths, including presenting Jews as enemies of Poland who seek to seize power ('Jewish occupation'), accusing them of reaping financial and political benefits from the Holocaust (the author even undermines this concept), as well as the desire to destroy the foundations of Latin civilization.

In 2018, Michalkiewicz caused outrage when he equated a rape survivor with a whore. The woman, who had been raped when she was 13 years old, won a 1 million złoty verdict against the religious order of the perpetrator priest Roman Behrendt who was also sentenced to eight years in jail. The rape victim later sued Michalkiewicz for defamation, and won a 150,000 złoty verdict against him. After the verdict against Michalkiewicz, he said he learned about the trial only when his bank account was seized. Michalkiewicz also published the protected personal identifying information of the victim on his website. The rape victim responded by saying she sued Michalkiewicz since she was not a whore but a child when she was raped by the priest, and that Michalkiewicz publishing her personal data is an act of revenge.

In 2019, Polish Australians and Jewish Australian community leaders protested Michalkiewicz's invitation to Australia by the Nasza Polonia group, due to his antisemitic statements.

== Books by Stanisław Michalkiewicz ==
- Ulubiony ustrój Pana Boga (God's Favorite Political System)
- Na gorącym uczynku (Red-handed)
- Choroba czerwonych oczu (Red Eyes Disease)
- W przededniu końca świata (The Day Before the End of the World)
- Polska ormowcem Europy (Poland as Europe's militiaman)
- Studia nad żydofilią (Studies About Philosemitism)
- Szczypta herezji (A Bit of Heresy)
- Spod listka figowego (From Under the Fig Leaf)
- Targowica urządza się przy Napoleonie (Targowica Settles Down with Napoleon)
- Na niemieckim pograniczu (On German Borderland)
- Dobry "zły" liberalizm (The Good "bad" Liberalism)
- Protector Traditorum
- Logika wystarczy (Logic Is Enough)
- Walka o fabrykę gwoździ (The Fight Over a Nail Factory)
- Nie bójcie się prawdy (Don't Be Afraid of the Truth)
- Wariant rozbiorowy (The Variant of Partition)
- Herrenvolk po żydowsku (Herrenvolk in Yiddish)
- Najnowszy testament (The Newest Testament)
- Teoria spiskowa (The Conspiracy Theory)
- Niemcy, Żydzi i folksdojcze (Germans, Jews and volksdeutsche)
- Naziści i Szabesgoje (Nazis and Shabbos goys)
