= Polish Institute of International Affairs =

Polish-based think tank

Polish Institute of International Affairs Polski Instytut Spraw Międzynarodowych
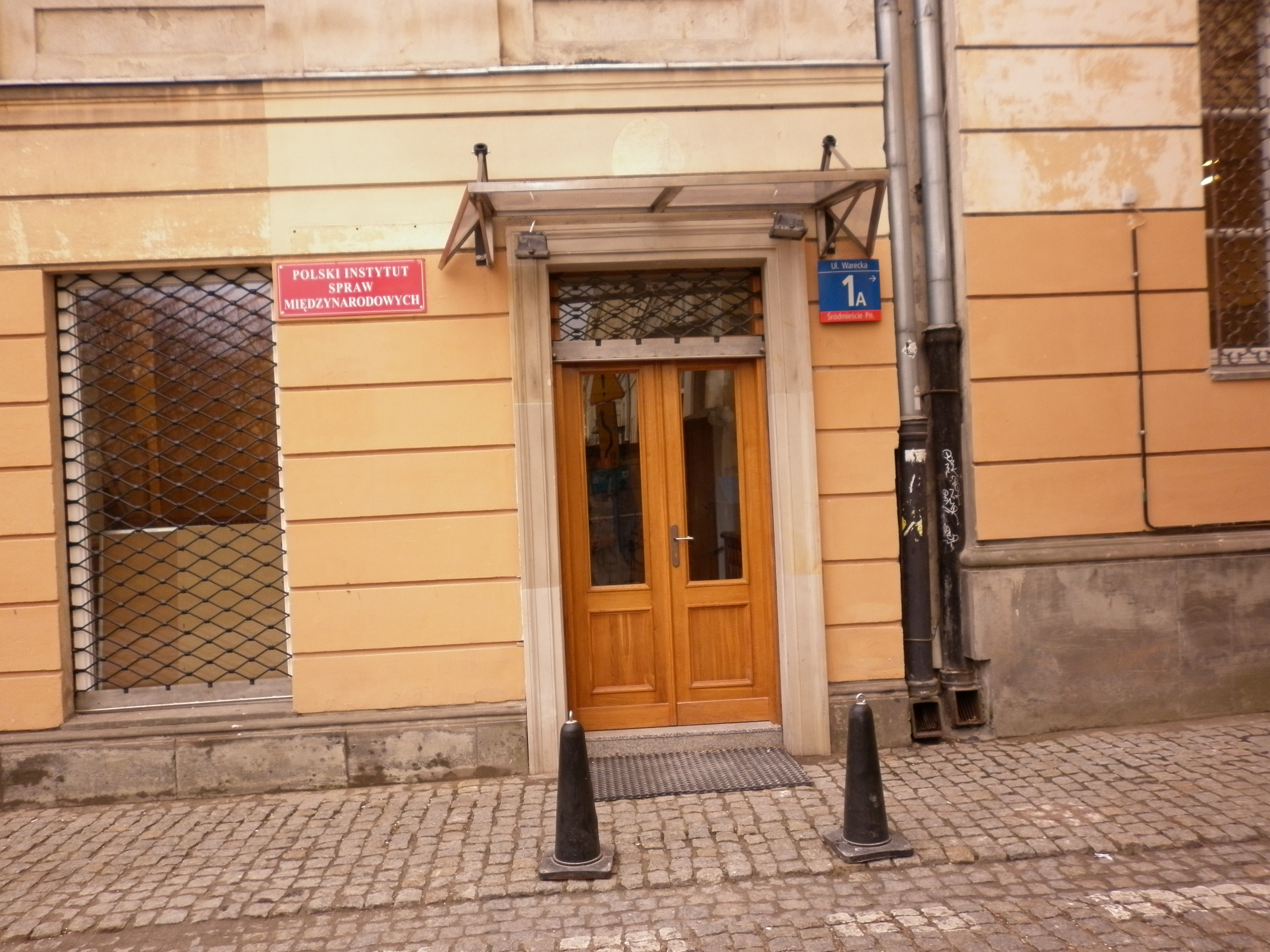
- Established: 3 June 1947
- Head: Jarosław Ćwiek-Karpowicz
- Address: ul. Warecka 1a, 00-950 Warszawa
- Website: https://www.pism.pl

The Polish Institute of International Affairs (PISM, Polish: Polski Instytut Spraw Międzynarodowych) is a Polish think tank based in Warsaw which carries out research and training in international relations. In this field, it ranks as one of the most influential think tanks not just in Central and Eastern Europe but in the European Union as a whole.

== History of PISM ==
PISM was established by the Parliament of the Republic of Poland in 1947. In 1972, the institute gained the right to confer doctoral degrees, of which the first recipient was Jerzy Robert Nowak. In 1993, the institute was closed and an “Office of International Studies – Institute of International Affairs” was created under the Ministry of Foreign Affairs. In 1996 the institute was reactivated, this time under the name Polish Institute of International Affairs. PISM is funded principally from the Polish state budget and it works closely with the Polish foreign and defense ministries.

== Activities of PISM ==
With a permanent research staff of thirty-five, PISM is prolific in the fields of European and European Union affairs, European Neighbourhood Policy with a particular emphasis on Ukraine, EU security policy, arms control and energy. The institute has produced notable reports not least on the question of missile defense, British efforts to renegotiate the EU treaties and the future of the EU, as well as being part of the international drafting committee for projects on a Euro-Atlantic/Eurasian Security Community and a European Global Strategy. PISM is one of the twenty-six members of the global Council of Councils, the think-tank counterpart to the G-20 major economies. Besides its core tasks of research and analysis, PISM organizes regular discussions with international dignitaries and has played host to personalities such as Henry Kissinger as well as then US presidential candidate Mitt Romney.

== Directors ==
- 1947 – Marion Mushkat
- 1947–1948 – Aleksander Weryka
- 1949–1951 – Marian Muszkat
- 1951–1957 – Julian Katz-Suchy
- 1957–1960 – Julian Hochfeld
- 1960–1964 – Ostap Dłuski
- 1964–1968 – Adam Kruczkowski
- 1968–1971 – Ryszard Frelek
- 1971–1980 – Marian Dobrosielski
- 1980–1987 – Janusz Symonides
- 1987–1991 – Maciej Perczyński
- 1991–1993 – Antoni Kamiński
- 1994–1996 – PISM as MFA unit
- 1999–2004 – Ryszard Stemplowski
- 2004–2005 – Jacek Foks (acting director)
- 2005–2007 – Roman Kuźniar
- 2007–2010 – Sławomir Dębski
- 2010–2015 – Marcin Zaborowski
- 2015–2016 – Anna Zielińska-Rakowicz (acting director)
- 2016–2024 – Sławomir Dębski
- 2024–present – Jarosław Ćwiek-Karpowicz
