= Tadeusz Rydzyk =

Polish Catholic priest and activist

Tadeusz Rydzyk CSsR
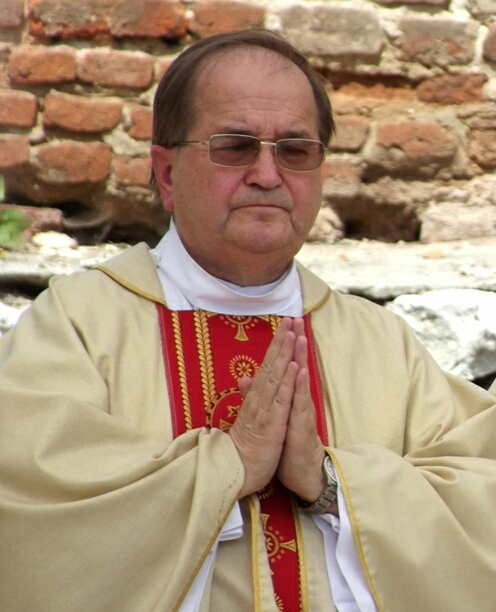
- Rydzyk in 2013

Personal life
- Born: 3 May 1945 (age 81) Olkusz, District of Opolian Silesia, Republic of Poland
- Education: Christian Theological Academy, Warsaw
- Known for: Conservative activism

Religious life
- Religion: Catholicism
- Ordination: 1971

Tadeusz Rydzyk (Polish pronunciation: [taˈdɛ.uʂ ˈrɨd͡zɨk]; born 3 May 1945) is a Polish Redemptorist Catholic priest and activist. He is the founder and director of the conservative Radio Maryja station, and founder of the University of Social and Media Culture in Toruń.

== Life and career ==
Tadeusz Rydzyk was born out of wedlock to his mother, the widowed Mrs. Rydzyk (née Piątek), whose first husband was killed in the Buchenwald concentration camp, and her boyfriend Bronisław Kordaszewski, a laborer with alcohol problems, and spent his childhood in Olkusz. He studied at the Higher Spiritual Seminary of Redemptorists in Tuchów, and later at the Catholic Theology Academy in Warsaw. He was ordained a priest in 1971 and taught religion in Toruń, Szczecinek and Kraków. In 1986 Rydzyk left for West Germany where he was involved with a radio station Radio Maria International in Balderschwang (later closed by the Catholic Church authorities for moving away from Catholic doctrine).

Following his return to Poland in 1991, Rydzyk started Radio Maryja. He established the Catholic newspaper Nasz Dziennik ('Our Daily') and the television station TV Trwam ('I Persist').

On 8 October 2009, Rydzyk earned a PhD in theology from the Cardinal Stefan Wyszyński University in Warsaw.

Polish journalist Tomasz Piątek, who has the same surname as Rydzyk's mother, has claimed that he is the cousin of Tadeusz Rydzyk.

== Controversies ==
In July 2009 Rydzyk made a racist comment towards a black missionary, Michał, who holds Polish citizenship and speaks fluent Polish. Michał was introduced to the stage by Rydzyk with these words "Dear, there's a negro. My God, you didn't bathe. Come here brother. He did not bathe at all. Look everyone." Rydzyk later claimed it was a joke and Michał reportedly found the joke funny. He also praised Radio Maryja after Rydzyk's racist introduction.

In February 2011, Rydzyk was fined 3,500 zloty after the local district court in Toruń found that he broke the law by using Radio Maryja to call for donations to TV Trwam, the University of Social and Media Culture, and the geothermal drilling conducted by the Lux Veritatis Foundation.

In June 2011, while meeting members of the European Parliament, he called Poland "an uncivilized country" and "a totalitarian regime", and claimed that it was not ruled by Poles. The Polish Ministry of Foreign Affairs protested against these statements and sent a diplomatic note to the Holy See, to which Catholic religious orders, including the Redemptorists, are subject.

In 2006, the US-based Anti-Defamation League accused Rydzyk and his Radio Maryja station of antisemitism.

Tadeusz Rydzyk commented on the award-winning documentary Tell No One that covers child molestation by Catholic Church clergy in Poland as follows: "Is it fair; is it caring? It's a fight against the Church calculated for its destruction." He said that the drama of the victims was turned into a "pedophilia industry" and that "we already had a club of antisemitism, Nazism, nationalism, fascism and now a club of pedophilia was formed. Hatred stands behind all this."

== See also ==
- Redemptorists
