= KoLiber =

Polish political association

Stowarzyszenie KoLiber
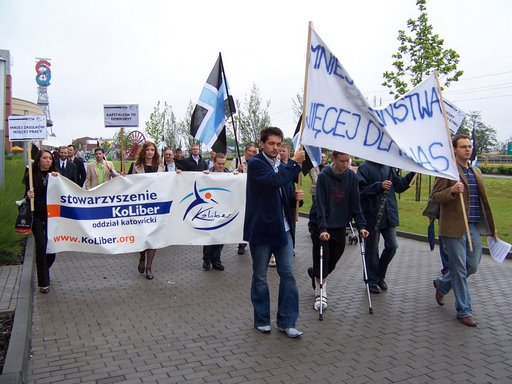
- Members of KoLiber durng a demonstration in Katowice, 2007
- Formation: 26 January 1999
- Purpose: Promoting conservatism and economical liberalism
- Location: Poland
- Region served: Poland
- Official language: Polish
- Leader: Karol Handzel
- Volunteers: Around 320 (December 2019)
- Website: koliber.org

KoLiber is a Polish political association. It has a parliamentary representation in the Sejm and Senate. KoLiber's ideology is conservative liberalism, capitalism, conservatism, and minarchism.

== Leaders ==
- Stanisław Wojtera (1999 – 2000)
- Jacek Szafader (2000 – 2001)
- Przemysław Wipler (2001)
- Stanisław Wojtera (2001 – 2002)
- Adam Wojtasiewicz (2002 – 2003)
- Marcin Kościukiewicz (2003 – 2004)
- Paweł Podsiedlik (2004 – 2005)
- Magdalena Murawska (2005 – 2006)
- Jacek Spendel (2006 – 2007)
- Karol Wyszyński (2007 – 2008)
- Marek Morawiak (2008 – 2009)
- Marcin Kamiński (2009 – 2011)
- Seweryn Szwarocki (2011 – 2012)
- Jakub Kulesza (2012 – 2013)
- Marcin Bagiński (2013 – 2014)
- Adam Kondrakiewicz (2014 – 2014)
- Tomasz Pułról (2014 – 2015)
- Kamil Rybikowski (2015 – 2016)
- Mikołaj Pisarski (2016 – 2017)
- Robert Iwanicki (2017 – 2018)
- Miłosz Jabłoński (2018 – 2019)
- Justyna Poświatowska (2019 – 2019)
- Karol Handzel (2019 – )

== Honorary members ==
- Roman Kluska
- Jeremi Mordasewicz
- Jan Pospieszalski
- Bronisław Wildstein
- Jan Winiecki
- Mart Laar
- Rafał Ziemkiewicz
- Robert Gwiazdowski
- Maciej Rybiński
- Stanisław Michalkiewicz
- Jaroslav Romanchuk
