= Tomasz Piątek =

Tomasz Piątek (born 1974) is a Polish journalist and writer. He is the author of several books, both fiction and non-fiction. For his reporting on the Polish Ministry of Defense he received the 2017 Press Freedom Award in 2017 from Reporters Without Borders. In 2018 he received a similar award from Medienstiftung der Sparkasse Leipzig.

Tomasz Piątek claims that he is the cousin of well known priest Father Tadeusz Rydzyk and shares his last name with Rydzyk's mother.
