= Bartosz Józwiak =

Polish politician and deputy

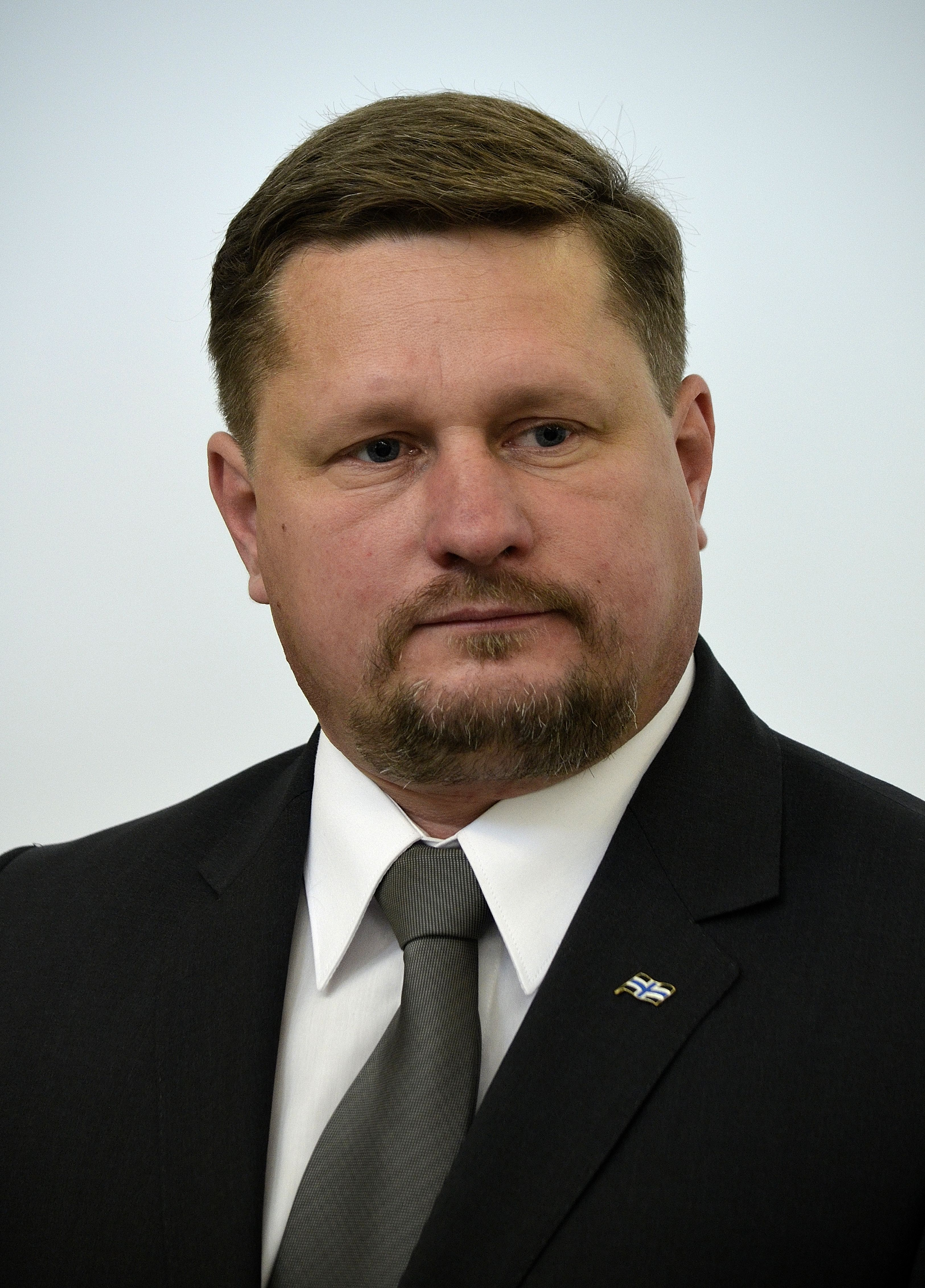
- Jóźwiak in 2015
- Born: 1 August 1973 (age 53); Września, Greater Poland, Poland
- Education: Adam Mickiewicz University in Poznań
- Occupations: Politician; archaeologist; university teacher
- Political party: Real Politics Union
- Board member of: 8. cadency Sejm (2015–2019)

Bartosz Józwiak [ˈbar.tɔʂ ˈju.zvjak] or Jóźwiak [ˈju.ʑvjak]; BARR-tosh YO-zvyak (born 1 August 1973 in Września) is a Polish politician, archaeologist, university teacher, a doctor of humanities, member of the 8th term of the Sejm, and the chairman of the Real Politics Union since 2011.

== Education and professional activity ==
In 1992, he graduated from Liceum Ogólnokształcące im. Henryka Sienkiewicza in Września. In 1997, he completed his studies in archaeology at the Faculty of History of the Adam Mickiewicz University in Poznań. From 1998 to 2002, he did his doctoral studies at this university. In 2002, based on a paper entitled Sub-Neolithic Communities of the Polish Lowlands Between the Oder and Vistula Rivers (Polish: Społeczności subneolityczne niżu Polski w międzyrzeczu Odry i Wisły), he obtained a Doctor of Humanities degree in archaeology. In 2003, he began work at the University of Gdańsk, where he became an assistant professor at the Institute of Archaeology and Ethnology. He has held short-term research placements in Ukraine and Belarus. He is a member of, among others, Poznań Prehistoric Society and the Stowarzyszenie Naukowe Archeologów Polskich. In 2007, he started his own business. In 2022, he became director of the IDMN Education Centre in Warsaw.

== Political career ==
Since 1997, he has been a supporting member of the Conservative-Monarchist Club. In 2006, he joined the Real Politics Union (UPR) and was, among others, secretary and president of the Greater Poland district, president of the Mazovian district, nationwide coordinator of the UPR Youth Section, and treasurer of the party. He was elected Chairman of the Real Politics Union on 19 February 2011. He ran unsuccessfully for the UPR as a candidate for the Greater Poland Regional Assembly in 2006, in 2007 for the Senate, and in 2009 for the European Parliament. In 2010, he ran unsuccessfully for the Gmina Września council on behalf of a local committee. While remaining the leader of the UPR, he simultaneously became involved in the National Movement (RN) as a member of its decision-making council. In 2014, he was the RN's candidate in the European elections and for the local council. After the RN was transformed into a political party, he became vice-president of the party. He left the RN after a few months.

In the 2015 parliamentary elections, he ran for the Sejm in the Konin district from first place on the list of the Kukiz'15 electoral committee (as a candidate of the UPR and RN). He obtained a mandate as an MP of the 8th term, receiving 8,747 votes. In 2016, he was briefly active in the Endecja association, which he co-founded. In 2018, on behalf of Kukiz'15, he ran for the office of mayor of Września, coming in last, in 4th place. In August of the following year, he left the Kukiz'15 parliamentary club, co-founding the UPR parliamentary circle. In 2019, he did not seek re-election as an MP. In 2024, however, he ran unsuccessfully for the Września County.
