= Janusz Symonides =

Polish jurist, diplomat and university professor (1938–2020)

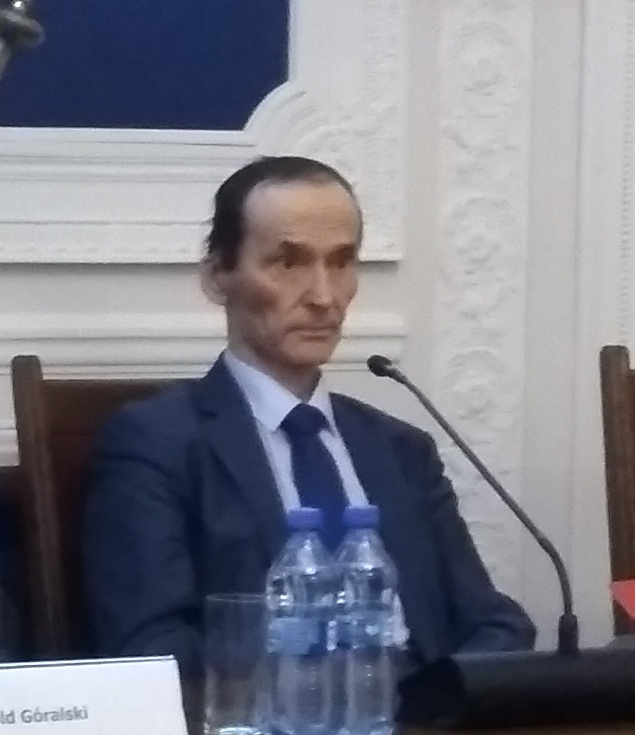
- Janusz Symonides (2019)
- Born: 5 March 1938; Brest, Second Polish Republic
- Died: 23 April 2020 (aged 82); Warsaw, Poland
- Resting place: Pyry Cemetery, Warsaw
- Education: Nicolaus Copernicus University in Toruń; Central School of Foreign Service
- Occupations: Jurist; Diplomat; University teacher
- Employer(s): Polish Institute of International Affairs, UNESCO, University of Warsaw, Nicolaus Copernicus University in Toruń
- Spouse: Magda Symonides
- Children: Bartosz, Marta, Michał, Karolina

Janusz Ignacy Symonides (5 March 1938 – 23 April 2020) was a Polish jurist, diplomat and university professor. A graduate of Central School of Foreign Service, he was a law professor at the University of Warsaw. His publications include focuses on human rights, the law of the sea, public international law and modern political areas of thought.

== Early life and education ==
Born on 5 March 1938 in Brest on the Bug in Poland, Janusz Symonides graduated from high school in Toruń with distinction in 1954. In 1963, his doctorate degree in 1963 in legal sciences from the Nicolaus Copernicus University paved the way for a remarkable academic career. At the age of 29, he was habilitated in international law at the Adam Mickiewicz University while from 1969 to 1973, he was one of the youngest Vice-Rectors at the Nicolaus Copernicus University of Torun and Director of the Institute of Legal and Constitutional Sciences.

== Academia ==
In 1973, Symonides became an associate professor and in 1980 a full professor. In 1973 – 1980, he was Vice President of the Polish Committee for European Security and Chairman of the Council of the Society of Friendship with Peoples at the National Committee of the Unity Front. He was one of the representatives of Poland during the work on the Convention on the Law of the Sea from Montego Bay. He was a member of the Legal Advisory Committee to the Minister of Foreign Affairs, an expert on the human dimension of the OSCE and a conciliator of the Montego Bay Convention. From 1980 to 1987 he was Director of the Polish Institute of International Affairs (PISM) and a lecturer at the Institute of International Relations at the Faculty of Political Sciences and International Studies at the University of Warsaw. In 1987 he stopped being the Director of PISM and left as a visiting professor at the EastWest Institute in New York.

== UNESCO ==
After an outstanding career as an academic and national expert, Symonides joined UNESCO in 1989 as the Director of the then Division of Human Rights, Democracy, Peace and Tolerance. He served with UNESCO until his retirement in 2000, leaving behind an impressive legacy. The change of the political landscape with the fall of the Berlin Wall led to the emergence of human rights as a common reference point for the international community. Indeed, the 90s witnessed a series of groundbreaking developments with the adoption of new standard-setting instruments and the creation of new mechanisms and greater space for the promotion of human dignity.

Symonides’s vision contributed greatly to UNESCO’s forefront position. He advocated for the elaboration of important new standard-setting instruments – such as the Declaration of Principles on Tolerance (1995) and Declaration on the Responsibilities of the Present Generations Towards Future Generations (1997). He was a driving force supporting UNESCO’s lead role together with the then newly created Office of the High Commissioner for Human Rights for the implementation of the UN Decade for Human Rights Education (1995–2004) and also the Organization’s contribution to a yearlong commemoration of the 50th anniversary of the Universal Declaration of Human Rights. Owing to his energy, the community of UNESCO Chairs dedicated to human rights, democracy, peace and tolerance – a new type of UNESCO-affiliated institution launched in 1992 – became among the most robust partners of the Organization.

Symonides supervised the publication of many papers, including the three-volume manual on human rights (Concepts and standards; New Dimensions and Challenges; and International Protection, Monitoring, Enforcement: International Protection, Monitoring, Enforcement) and the toolbook A Guide to Human Rights. He continued contributing to UNESCO’s work, with highlights his participation in the group of experts who elaborated the Venice Statement on the Right to Enjoy the Benefits of Scientific Progress and Its Application and his membership of the Jury of the UNESCO/Bilbao Prize for the promotion of a culture of human rights, last awarded in 2012.

== Lecturing ==
After leaving UNESCO, Symonides returned to Poland and became a lecturer at the Institute of International Relations at the University of Warsaw and head of the Department of International and Community Law of the Institute of International Relations at the Nicolaus Copernicus University until 2010. He has been a guest lecturer at many universities. Including a lecturer in international law and the law of the sea at the Romanian University of Vlad Ţepeşa. lecturer at the Faculty of Humanities at the Polish Social Academy of Sciences.

He continued to contribute to the work of international bodies on human rights and was also Expert for the Human Dimension Mechanism of the OSCE, 2003–2006; Arbitrator and Conciliator for the Convention of the Law of the Sea, 2004–2020; Polish Member of the Permanent Court of Arbitration, 2005–2017; Member of the Arbitral Tribunal for the Arctic Sunrise (Netherlands v. Russia), 2014–2017, judge ad hoc of the European Court of Human Rights, 2018–2020.

== Writing ==
Symonides wrote over 600 works, including 40 books and manuals, on human rights, law of the sea, international law and international relations. He was also member of many editorial boards and scientific councils, as well as participated in over 250 international conferences, seminars and symposia and delivered lectures in many countries and institutions such as The Hague Academy of International Law, 1988; Salzburg Seminar; Dubrovnik Seminar; International Institute of Human Rights, Strasbourg; Institute of International Public Law of Thessaloniki; Summer University of Human Rights, Geneva.

== Death ==
On 23 April 2020, Symonides died, survived by his wife Magda and their four children, Bartosz, Marta, Michał and Karolina.

== Honours and awards ==
- Medal of the 30th Anniversary of People's Poland
- Medal of the 40th Anniversary of People's Poland
- Polish Cross of Merit
- Commander's Cross of the Order of Polonia Restituta
- Officer's Cross of the Order of Polonia Restituta
- First Class Awards of Minister of Education
- Gold Medal for Long Service
- Gold Cross of Merit
- Bene Merito for recognition of merits in promoting and strengthening the position of Poland in the international arena

== Books ==
- Human Rights: Concept and Standards
- Prawo międzynarodowe publiczne (wspólnie z Remigiuszem Bierzankiem), Warszawa 1985–2009 (8 editions)
- Kontrola międzynarodowa, Toruń 1964
- Terytorium państwa w świetle zasady efektywności, Toruń 1961
- The New Law of the Sea, Warszawa 1988
- The Struggle against Discrimination, Paris 1996
- Human Rights: New Dimensions and Challenges, Aldershot-Burlinghton-Singapur-Sydney 2000
- Human Rights of Women; A Collection of International and Regional Normative Instruments (with Vladimir Volodin), Paris 1999
- Acces to Human Rights Documentation (with Vladimir Volodin), Paris 1994
- Human Rights : New Dimensions and Challenges (1998)
- UNESCO and Human Rights (with Vladimir Volodin), Paris 1999 (2 editions)
- A Guide to Human Rights: Institutions, Standarts, Procedures (with Vladimir Volodin), Paris 2001
