= Conservative-Monarchist Club =

Polish right-wing organization

- Klub Zachowawczo-Monarchistyczny
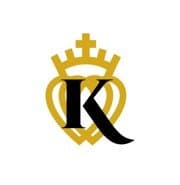
- Formation: 1988
- Type: Monarchist; Integral nationalist Traditionalist conservative Catholic nationalist Counter-revolutionary; Anti-democracy; Eurosceptic; Anti-socialist; Anti-communist
- Headquarters: Poland
- Chairman: Adam Wielomski
- Website: konserwatyzm.pl

The Conservative-Monarchist Club (Polish: Klub Zachowawczo-Monarchistyczny, abbr. KZ-M) is a Polish organization of traditionalist, counter-revolutionary, and Catholic character. It was founded on 7 March 1988 as a society. The doctrine of the club can be characterised as integral conservatism. It is a metapolitical organisation, keeping apart from daily politics, instead, it aims at advancing ideas of free market and Catholic traditionalism. It considers itself a successor to the Conservative-Monarchist Club founded in Kraków, 1926, which in turn succeeded the Conservative Party founded in 1922. The club publishes a quarterly entitled Pro Fide Rege et Lege and maintains the internet portal konserwatyzm.pl.

== Notable members ==
- Marek Jurek
- Jan Filip Libicki
- Marcin Libicki
- Adam Wielomski
- Janusz Korwin-Mikke

== See also ==
- Union of Real Politics
- Camp of Great Poland (association)
