= Right Alliance =

Right Alliance may refer to:

- Right Alliance (Poland), a former Polish centre-right conservative political party
- Right Alliance (Belarus), a youth non-governmental organization in Belarus
