= Real Politics Union =

Real Politics Union Unia Polityki Realnej
- President: Bartosz Józwiak
- Founder: Janusz Korwin-Mikke
- Founded: 14 November 1987 (as a society); 6 December 1990 (as a party)
- Headquarters: ul. Złota 7/18, 00–019 Warsaw
- Youth wing: KoLiber
- Ideology: Current: Conservative liberalism; Federalism; National conservatism; National Liberalism; Economic liberalism; Right-wing populism; Soft Euroscepticism; Historical: Libertarian conservatism; Classical liberalism; Right-libertarianism; Hard Euroscepticism
- Political position: Right-wing
- National affiliation: Civic Platform (2001); National Movement (2012–2015); Kukiz'15 (2015–2019)
- European affiliation: European Christian Political Party
- Colours: Black, Azure, White
- Sejm: 0 / 460
- Senate: 0 / 100
- European Parliament: 0 / 51
- Regional assemblies: 0 / 552

Party flag

Website
- www.uniapolitykirealnej.org.pl

The Real Politics Union (Polish: Unia Polityki Realnej, UPR) is a national conservative and economically liberal political party in Poland. In the past it was right-libertarian and classical liberal.

== Popular support and funding ==
UPR was founded in 1987 as the classic liberal Real Politics Movement by Janusz Korwin-Mikke, who later became its long-term leader.

In the 1990s and 2000s, UPR consistently had the support of 1–2% of voters in general elections, too low to receive public funding under Polish electoral law. As a consequence, it has faced prolonged financial difficulties since its inception. In the 1991 legislative election, the party won 3 seats.

In the parliamentary election in 2001, the UPR candidates started from lists of Civic Platform to Sejm. To the Senate both parties joined centre-right coalition Senate 2001 with other post-Solidarity parties.

UPRs candidates commenced their political campaign from its short-lived satellite party Janusz Korwin-Mikke's Platform ("Platforma Janusza Korwin-Mikke"). The PJKM also did not manage to cross the required 5% threshold in the 2005 parliamentary elections (it got only 1.57%).

In the parliamentary election in 2007, the UPR candidates campaigned in cooperation with the League of Polish Families but did not enter into a formal coalition. The list on which both the UPR and the League appeared saw the UPR get 1.5% votes. This was insufficient to get any of their candidates into the lower house ("Sejm") and therefore the UPR remains unable to obtain public funding.

In October 2009, Janusz Korwin-Mikke left the party and its another former chairman, Stanisław Michalkiewicz, resigned from his honorary membership. In the following years, party became more nationalist.

In the 2011 elections, Stanisław Żółtek (along with pro Korwin-Mikke faction) took part in the foundation of Congress of the New Right, which was led by the former chairman of the UPR Janusz Korwin-Mikke.

In the 2012, UPR (along with the All-Polish Youth and National Radical Camp) formed far-right political alliance National Movement, which merged into the political party in the 2014.

UPR cooperated with National Movement in the European Parliament election in 2014, Polish local elections in 2014 and the presidential election in 2015. In the Polish parliamentary election in 2015, the whole National Movement stand for the Sejm from the lists of Kukiz'15.

At the end of 2015, UPR leader Bartosz Józwiak left National Movement which ended the partnership between these parties.

In the 2019 election, UPR left Kukiz'15, because it did not want to join the coalition with Polish People's Party. It created its own parliamentary group which consisted of four members that existed till the end of the 8th Sejm. Some of UPR associated members were candidates of Law and Justice party in 2019 election.

On 21 February 2020, UPR joined European Christian Political Party. In March, UPR declared willingness to cooperate with Agreement party. In the second round of 2020 presidential election, UPR supported Andrzej Duda,;the party did not support any of the candidates before the first round.

== Leadership ==
- Janusz Korwin-Mikke (1990–1997)
- Stanisław Michalkiewicz (1997–1999)
- Janusz Korwin-Mikke (1999–2002)
- Stanisław Wojtera (2002–2005)
- Jacek Boroń (2005)
- Wojciech Popiela (2005–2008)
- Bolesław Witczak (2008–2011)
- Bartosz Józwiak (2011–)

== Support and Elections Results ==
=== Sejm and Senate ===
Elections	Vote %	+/-	Seats (Sejm)	+/-	Seats (Senate)	+/-
1991	2,26%	–	3 / 460	–	0 / 100	–
1993	3,18%	0,92	0 / 460	3	0 / 100	–
1997	2,03%	1,15	0 / 460	–	0 / 100	–
2001	–	–	0 / 460	–	0 / 100	–
2005	1,57%	–	0 / 460	–	0 / 100	–
2007	–	–	0 / 460	–	0 / 100	–
2011	–	–	0 / 460	–	0 / 100	–
2015	–	–	2 / 460	2	0 / 100	–
2019	–	–	0 / 460	2	0 / 100	–
2023	–	–	0 / 460	–	0 / 100	–

== See also ==
- Conservative-Monarchist Club
