= Nasz Dziennik =

Polish daily newspaper

- Type: Daily newspaper
- Format: Compact
- Publisher: Spes sp. z o.o.
- Editor-in-chief: Ewa Nowina-Konopka
- Founded: 1998; 28 years ago
- Political alignment: Traditionalist Catholicism; Polish nationalism Social conservatism
- Language: Polish
- Headquarters: Warsaw
- ISSN: 1429-4834
- OCLC number: 613125892
- Website: www.naszdziennik.pl

Nasz Dziennik (Polish pronunciation: [ˈnaʂ ˈd͡ʑɛn.ɲik], "Our Daily") is a Polish-language traditionalist Catholic daily newspaper published six times a week in Warsaw, Poland. It is connected to the Lux Veritatis Foundation. Its viewpoint has been described as right-wing to far-right (harking back to the prewar National Democracy political movement), and is supportive of the traditionalist Catholicism "closed church".

== History and profile ==
Nasz Dziennik was established in 1998. The paper is published by Spes Ltd.

Nasz Dziennik is a right-wing to far-right publication whose editorial policies combine radical traditionalist Catholicism with Polish nationalism. Similarly to the closely linked Radio Maryja, the newspaper adheres to the "Closed Church" movement, which rejects the determinations of the Second Vatican Council. The newspaper was an influential antisemitic information channel.

Articles in Nasz Dziennik have been supportive of conversion therapy (or "reparative therapy", Odwaga) for homosexuality which is viewed by Nasz Dziennik as a form of disease or corruption. Robert Biedroń, president of Campaign Against Homophobia, filed a lawsuit against a Nasz Dziennik columnist over references to homosexuality as a disease. Sociologist Adam Ostolski has compared Nasz Dziennik's homophobic discourse with the antisemitic discourse of the kindred Mały Dziennik of the 1930s. Nasz Dziennik is known for opposing what it calls a "civilisation of death", and opposed the 2004 march against homophobia in Kraków.

The language and ideology of Nasz Dziennik has been compared to the pre–World War II National Democracy (Endecja) movement, which advocated an exclusionary definition of "Polishness" as associated with Catholicism. Nasz Dziennik also frequently refers to the "Poles' Five Truths", a canon of national values first formulated in the late 1930s and cited by present-day Polish nationalists, which include the statement that "Our ancestors' faith is the faith of our children". During the public debate in Poland over the 1941 Jedwabne pogrom, Nasz Dziennik denied Polish involvement and published antisemitic letters as well as "scholarly" articles explaining the pogrom as revenge for treasonous actions by Jewish communists. Nasz Dziennik opposed a Polish national apology for Jedwabne as "unnecessary submission and compliance", which would invite further "demands, libel, accusations, and blackmail from the all-powerful Jewish lobby". During the debate over the Auschwitz cross, Nasz Dziennik defended the cross, publishing articles on the matter that ranged from informative to antisemitic.

Nasz Dziennik has opposed the enlargement of the European Union, in part due to concerns over prospective land sales to foreigners. Clergymen writing in Nasz Dziennik have painted a picture of a modern-day Europe in which "dangerous others": liberals, Jews, atheists, masons gather; these opponents are also seen as having an internal "fifth column" inside Poland which is heretical and cosmopolitan.

Nasz Dziennik initially refrained from reporting on the "sex affair" (pl:Seksafera w Samoobronie) involving Andrzej Lepper and Stanisław Łyżwiński; however, after it became an allegedly political matter, Nasz Dziennik articles on the subject referred to "conspiracy-related arguments" and alleged that Gazeta Wyborcza was involved in a "coup d'état". Following the 2010 Polish Air Force Tu-154 crash, Nasz Dziennik wrote about Soviet-era atrocities such as the murder of priests and the Katyn massacre, using the adjective "Russian" instead of "Soviet" in an attempt to blame the modern Russian regime for past Soviet crimes. Nasz Dziennik further compared the investigation of the crash, which it saw as faulty, with the Soviets' cover-up of the Katyn massacre.

Nasz Dziennik's editor-in-chief is Ewa Nowina Konopka, and one of its main sources of revenue is advertising at both local and national levels. Nasz Dziennik is part of an independent Catholic media conglomerate founded by Father Tadeusz Rydzyk, director of the Lux Veritatis Foundation, which owns the Trwam TV channel and the Radio Maryja radio station.

Nasz Dziennik's circulation was 129,500 in January–February 2001; about 150,000 in 2007. According to the newspaper Rzeczpospolita, alternate sources gave its 1999 circulation as 250,000 and its 1998 readership as 600,000.

== Bookshops ==
Nasz Dziennik operates bookshops in Warsaw and Kraków.

== TV Trwam presence ==
Nasz Dziennik journalists present their opinions every Friday night in "Warto zauważyć" ("Worth noting").
