= New Silk Road Initiative =

Defunct US initiative to invest in Central Asia

The New Silk Road Initiative was a United States initiative in the 2010s that aimed to integrate Afghanistan with Central Asia, boosting trade and economic development. Originally developed by the staff of General David Petraeus at the United States Central Command, it was formally announced by US Secretary of State Hillary Clinton in 2011 in a speech in Chennai. However, the initiative never got off the ground. General Jim Mattis cancelled all military funding after Petraeus retired, and the US State Department lacked the funds to implement the projects. The term "New Silk Road" is now commonly used by journalists to refer to China's Belt and Road Initiative.

Key projects that were previously linked to the US initiative were later funded by other sources. The CASA-1000 hydroelectricity project is being funded by a consortium led by the International Development Association. The United States contributed 1% of the cost of the project before it pulled out, making it the smallest of seven funding sources. The Turkmenistan-Afghanistan-Pakistan-India Pipeline (TAPI) is being funded by a consortium led by the Asian Development Bank. A 2021 rumor alleged that the United States provided funding to TAPI, but this is untrue.
