= Radio Maryja =

Polish radio station

- Type: Subsidiary
- Industry: Radio broadcasting
- Founded: December 8, 1991; 34 years ago
- Headquarters: Toruń, Poland
- Key people: Tadeusz Rydzyk – Founder and Director; Jan Król – Vice-director
- Parent: Lux Veritatis Foundation
- Website: radiomaryja.pl

Radio Maryja [ˈradjɔ maˈrɨja] is a religious and political socially conservative Polish non-profit radio station. It was founded in Toruń, Poland, on 9 December 1991, by the Redemptorist Tadeusz Rydzyk. The name "Maryja" is a traditional Polish form of the name "Mary", referring to the Virgin Mary.

== Programming and audience ==
Radio Maryja's programmes consist of broadcasts from the station's news agency; frequent recitals of the rosary, the breviary, and the Chaplet of the Divine Mercy; the unction to the Black Madonna of Częstochowa; discussions on the Catechism of the Catholic Church; a daily transmission of the Mass; coverage of papal trips; and sociological and political programmes. It takes positions against feminism, gay rights, the "Islamisation" of Europe, Middle Eastern refugees and the EU, and promotes social conservatism.

Radio Maryja's audience is reputed to consist mostly of rural and elderly listeners. The station says that it has "millions of listeners"; market research indicates approximately 1.2 million people daily. The station estimates that it is listened to by well over 10% of adults in Poland; the most comprehensive market research by Radio Track for the whole of Poland (June–July 2005) shows a 2.5% "share of listening time".

The Economist has summarized that, "The church in Poland is divided between Vatican loyalists, who often oppose close involvement in politics, and energetic dissidents linked to Radio Maryja, a hardline broadcaster. This once had huge clout, articulating the feelings of Poles alienated by the country's brisk, materialist business culture and the decay in moral norms. But Radio Maryja's audience has shrunk in the past decade to no more than 2% of all current listeners."

== Ownership and finances ==
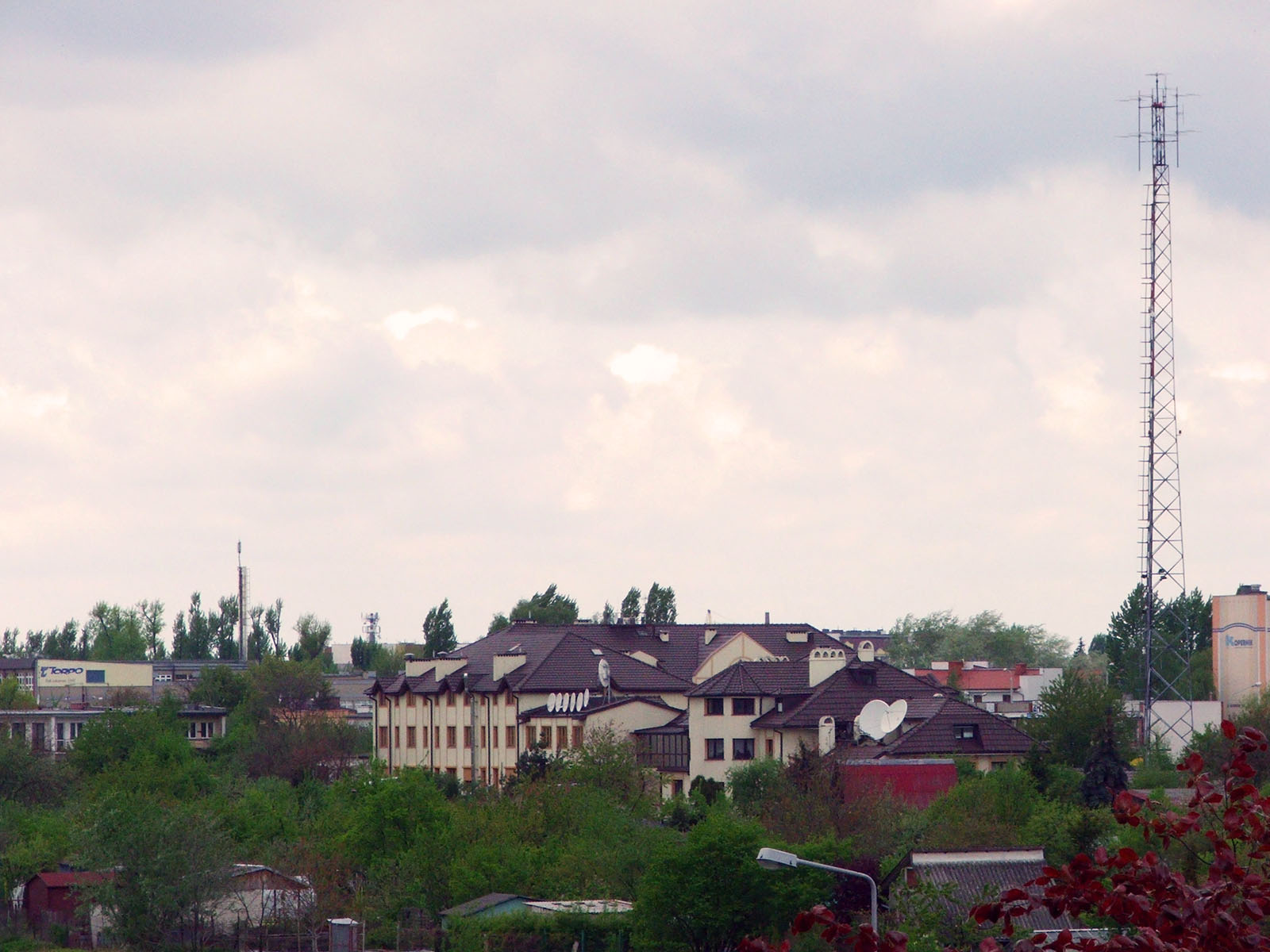
The Radio Maryja headquarters in Toruń.

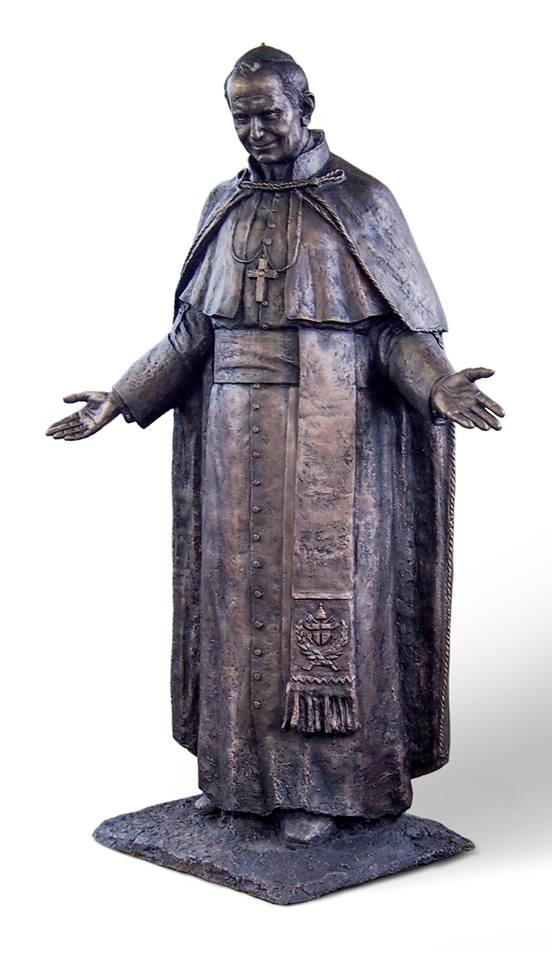
Statue of John Paul II in front of the Radio Maryja headquarters, by Giennadij Jerszow 2014.

The station is owned by the Warsaw Province of the Congregation of the Most Holy Redeemer, and is financed through donations from its audience. This is an unusual characteristic in Poland, where most radio stations are either publicly funded or dependent on advertising revenue. Due to a concordat with the Holy See that grants certain privileges to the Church, Radio Maryja is not bound by normal accounting rules as it is regarded as being Church-operated. Thus, Radio Maryja is not required to disclose the exact sources of its financing or enterprises, and does not pay taxes. Radio Maryja has disclosed that it is financed by Jan Kobylański, an Uruguay-based billionaire and by Edward Moskal, the chairman of the Polish American Congress.

In February 2011, the local district court of Toruń issued a fine of 3,500zł (1181.3 USD in 2011) to Fr Rydzyk, finding that he illegally used Radio Maryja broadcasts to raise funds for his television station, Telewizja Trwam; his University of Social and Media Culture; and a geothermal drilling project run by Fundacja Lux Veritatus. Fr Rydzyk denounced the verdict, calling it an "injustice" and saying that Polish law ran "contrary to natural law." To date, he has refused to pay the fine. In August 2012, a political controversy transpired when Anna Sobecka, a Law and Justice MP and close ally of Rydzyk's, applied to pay the fine from her own pocket despite not having the authorization to do so. The district court of Toruń requested that the police investigate her action. Later in 2012 Radio Maryja was fined by the National Broadcasting Council for "hidden advertising".

Enterprises related to Radio Maryja include the television station Trwam ("I Persist"); a daily newspaper Nasz Dziennik ("Our Daily"); the Nasza Przyszłość ("Our Future") Foundation; the Lux Veritatis Foundation ("The Light of Truth Foundation"); and the Wyższa Szkoła Kultury Społecznej i Medialnej ("The College of Social and Media Culture") in Toruń.

== Criticisms and controversies ==
Radio Maryja sparked many controversies and is frequently criticised both in Poland and abroad. Bishop Tadeusz Pieronek, the former secretary general of the Episcopate of Poland, said that Radio Maryja is "a real and growing problem", adding that the station "offers a reduced view on Christianity" that is "extremely compromising and shameful, sick and dangerous."

=== Reaction from religious institutions ===
The Holy See expressed concern over the station, with the Episcopate of Poland warning Radio Maryja about engaging in "political broadcasting". Cardinal Stanisław Dziwisz of Kraków and the country's then Primate, Cardinal Józef Glemp, have urged fellow bishops to take immediate action against the station. In 2002, the Primate ordered Radio Maryja to close its operations in his archdiocese. Press commentators suggested that a schism could occur, but a group of Polish bishops rejected those speculations, which they said "bore no relation to reality". In 2005, Cardinal Józef Glemp said that Radio Maryja was causing a rift in the Church.

In 2006, the papal nuncio to Poland, Archbishop Józef Kowalczyk, wrote to Polish bishops requesting their aid "to overcome difficulties caused by some transmissions and the views presented by Radio Maryja." He also warned of sanctions against activity "considered unlawful or damaging to the Church". According to the official Vatican web page, "Radio Maryja, a nation-wide radio system organised by the Redemptorist Fathers, became much more involved in spreading risky politics than in spreading the Gospel." Pope Benedict XVI warned Radio Maryja to quit engaging in politics.

The Polish bishops remain divided over Radio Maryja, given its considerable influence among its primary audience of the elderly rural poor. While some bishops have criticized Radio Maryja for spreading opinions incompatible with the official teaching of the Catholic Church, others voice support for the station. Critics say that the Polish bishops have been divided over Radio Maryja for a long time. As an alternative, there exist local radio stations broadcasting on FM in many dioceses of Poland ["Katolickie Radio ..."] with support of their bishops. About 20 stations connected themselves in 2013 to an independent network.

Lech Wałęsa, the Nobel Prize laureate and former president of Poland, has stated that Radio Maryja "is lying if it considers itself a Catholic station," According to a 2013 article in the liberal Catholic weekly magazine Tygodnik Powszechny, which belongs to ITI Group, the cause of the ills of the Church in Poland is Radio Maryja.

=== Allegations of antisemitism ===
According to the Anti-Defamation League and other critics, the radio has promoted nationalism and antisemitism since its inception. The charges of antisemitism against Radio Maryja have brought the station to worldwide attention.

In January 2000, Radio Maryja aired an interview between Ryszard Bender, a historian from the Catholic University of Lublin, and Dariusz Ratajczak, a convicted Holocaust denier who said that Auschwitz was a labor camp rather than an extermination camp.

In April 2006, well-known Polish essayist Stanisław Michalkiewicz – a major personality on Telewizja Trwam – was reported in Gazeta Wyborcza as stating that "men from Judea ... are trying to surprise us from behind," and referring to the World Jewish Congress as "a main firm in the Holocaust Industry".

In July 2007, over 700 Polish Catholic intellectuals, journalists, priests and activists signed a public letter of protest condemning Radio Maryja's antisemitic remarks. Poland's Media Ethics Council referred to the station's "weakly documented accusations" against Jews as "primitive anti-Semitism" and condemned Radio Maryja.

According to a U.S. State Department report from 2008, "Radio Maryja is one of Europe's most blatantly anti-Semitic media venues." A report of the Council of Europe stated that Radio Maryja has been "openly inciting to antisemitism for several years."

In 2011 the Polish Broadcasting Authority Commission examined two programs on Radio Maryja and reprimanded the station for its antisemitic statements and "nationalistic racism". The Simon Wiesenthal Center initiated a petition condemning Radio Maryja's alleged antisemitic statements.

In January 2017, a report published by the Anti-Defamation League in the U.S. accused Radio Maryja of "25 years of anti-Semitism".

In 2017, Rydzyk – with the help of the head of the From The Depths foundation Jonny Daniels – invited a group of Israeli politicians, including Knesset Deputy Speaker Yehiel Bar and Israeli Minister of Communications Ayoub Kara), to a Radio Maryja commemorative ceremony in the city of Torun devoted to the theme of "Remembrance and Hope". The event was held in the Chapel of Remembrance, situated in the Temple of Our Lady the Star of New Evangelization and St. John Paul II and was ostensibly held to honor Polish Righteous Among the Nations who had saved Jews from the German death camps during World War II.

The visit of the Israeli delegation came under strong attack by some commentators, notably in the Israeli media, who accused the members of the delegation of turning a blind eye to Radio Maryja's and its director's long history of antisemitism.

=== Involvement in politics ===
Jarosław Kaczyński, the former Prime Minister of Poland, was a regular guest on Radio Maryja, as were other rightist or far-right politicians such as Andrzej Lepper and Zbigniew Ziobro. When it became aware of the station's service to conservative parties, the Holy See demanded that it "drop the politics." Asked whether Fr Rydzyk would himself form a party, Bishop Pieronek replied that he could not imagine a priest starting a political organization. Pieronek drew an analogy saying that Hitler also took advantage of religion for his political purposes with the use of the motto "Gott mit uns".

Radio Maryja strongly opposed Poland joining the European Union in 2004. The station promoted the political program of the Law and Justice party, which together with Lech Kaczyński sought to introduce capital punishment in Poland and throughout Europe. Support for the death penalty contrasts strongly with the mainstream teachings of the Roman Catholic Church.

In February 2006, Law and Justice signed a key agreement with two other political parties. To the fury of the Polish press, only Rydzyk and journalists from Telewizja Trwam – who actively supported Law and Justice during the election – were allowed in the room during the signing. The President of the Polish National Broadcasting Council, Elżbieta Kruk, stated that she had no authority to act in regard to these complaints, as she had been appointed by the Polish President Lech Kaczyński, a member of Law and Justice. Critics asserted that the government feared alienating Radio Maryja's dedicated audience, which makes up a significant fraction of Law and Justice's political base.

In March 2006, Polish literary critic and television personality Kazimiera Szczuka satirized a girl who frequently recites prayers on Radio Maryja, not knowing that the girl used a wheelchair. Despite Szczuka's public apology, the Polish Broadcasting Council found her guilty of "insulting a disabled person and mocking her religion." The station on which she had appeared was fined the equivalent of $125,000; according to the Polish press, the highest fine the council had ever levied. The sole dissenting member of the council, Wojciech Dziomdziora, speculated that Radio Maryja's ties with Law and Justice was "the real reason" for Szczuka's punishment, noting that Szczuka was made to pay the stiff fine while Radio Maryja was allowed to disparage other religions with impunity.

Following international criticism in 2006, the Holy See's Warsaw Nuncio, Archbishop Józef Kowalczyk, with respect to the stations's involvement in politics, called on the Polish bishops to ensure that the station respected "the appropriate autonomy of the public sphere". Poland's bishops’ conference fashioned an agreement whereby it would assume partial control of a new programme council at Radio Maryja.

In September 2012, Radio Maryja and TV Trwam organized a "Poland awake!" demonstration with Law and Justice to protest the centrist government's purported attempt to silence both stations by not including them on the country's digital television multiplex. The demonstration led to renewed criticism of the station's politicized message from high-ranking Catholic clergymen. Bishop Piotr Jarecki, a vice president in the Commission of the Bishops' Conferences of the European Community, said in an interview that the stations' action was "not in accordance with the doctrine of the Church," and said that they were "entering a dangerous path of confusion and turmoil."

=== Remarks about President Lech Kaczyński and wife ===
In 2007, Polish first lady Maria Kaczyńska met with fifty female journalists for International Women's Day; the women signed a statement to protest a tightening of Poland's already strict abortion laws. Rydzyk caused controversy when he described the meeting as a "cesspool". Later, the newsmagazine Wprost published a recording from one of Rydzyk's lectures in which he allegedly called Kaczyńska "a witch who should perform euthanasia on herself." He also said that President Lech Kaczyński "cheated" him, and called him "a swindler who had bowed to pressure from the Jewish lobby." Rydzyk suggested the tapes were doctored and called the story "fictitious".

Archbishop Jozef Michalik said that no disciplinary action would be taken against the director of Radio Maryja: "You can't judge a person from just one statement, or on the basis of some lack of tact."

In 2012, Radio Maryja, which has long criticized Freemasonry, broadcast an interview saying that the plane crash which killed President Kaczyński two years earlier – among "many other acts" – was the result of a Masonic plot against the Law and Justice party.

== Supporters and their response to criticism ==
Enthusiasts of the station say that Radio Maryja is a target of the media which have waged a "smear campaign" and that bigoted statements transmitted by the station are very rare and originate from its listeners rather than employees. The former cabinet of Jarosław Kaczyński openly supported Radio Maryja. In December 2006, Kaczyński joined the 15th anniversary celebrations of Radio Maryja and praised the station as a source of "comfort and hope".

Support for Radio Maryja is often voiced in Nasz Dziennik, which is related to the station.

== See also ==
- Mohair berets
- Politics of Poland
- Media in Poland
- Far-right politics in Poland
- Religion in Poland
