= Lux Veritatis Foundation =

Polish religious organization

- Formation: April 27, 1998; 28 years ago
- Legal status: foundation
- Location: Warsaw, Poland
- Official language: pl
- Father Director: Tadeusz Rydzyk
- Website: luxveritatis.pl

The Lux Veritatis Foundation (Polish: Fundacja Lux Veritatis) is a Polish religious organization founded in Warsaw in 1996 by two Redemptorists: Fr. Tadeusz Rydzyk and Fr. Jan Król. It is the owner of the Trwam TV. In 2006, it got the concession to explore thermal water in Toruń.
