= Telewizja Trwam =

Polish Catholic TV channel

- Country: Poland
- Broadcast area: Europe; North America
- Headquarters: Toruń, Poland

Programming
- Language: Polish
- Picture format: 576i (SDTV)

Ownership
- Owner: Fundacja Lux Veritatis

History
- Launched: 12 June 2003; 22 years ago

Links
- Website: tv-trwam.pl

Availability

Terrestrial
- Polish Digital: MUX 1 (Channel 16)

TV Trwam is a Polish TV channel in Toruń, Poland, belonging to the Lux Veritatis Foundation. The station is associated with the Catholic media.

== Ownership and financing ==
The station is owned by the Warsaw Province of the Congregation of the Most Holy Redeemer and is financed through donations from its audience, the Radio Maryja Family. That is unlike most other Polish television stations, which are publicly funded or dependent on advertising revenue.

== Distribution ==
It is available in many countries around the world by cable or satellite, including the United States, Germany, Canada, France, Italy and Switzerland. It is also transmitted free to air from Astra 1L 19,2E satellite in Europe and Galaxy 19 satellite in North America.

== History ==
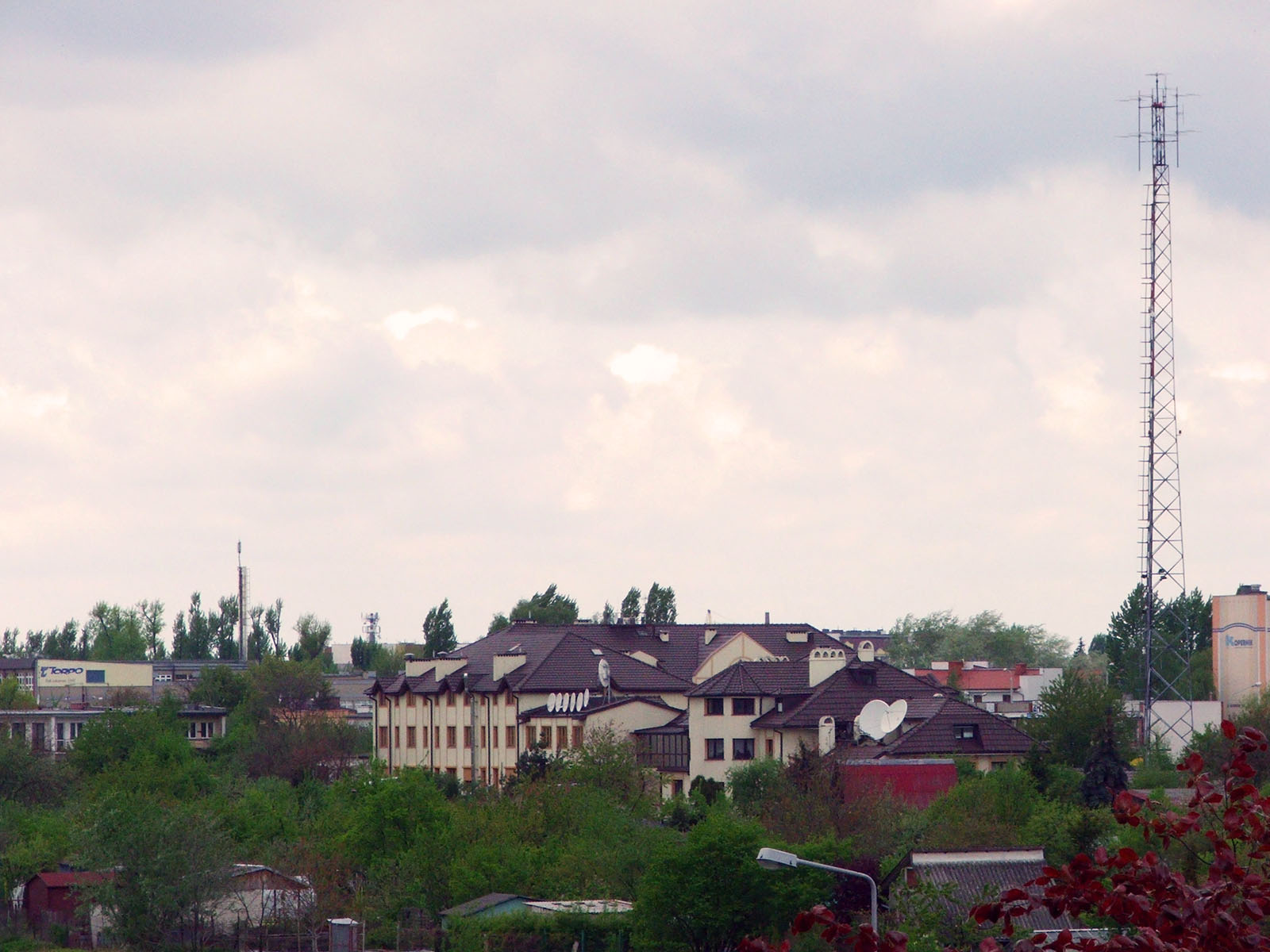
The Radio Maryja headquarters are housed in a modern building amid gardens in the north of Toruń.

The station has its television studios in Toruń and Warsaw. The television studio is the second largest in the country (over 700 sq m). TV Trwam received its license on 13 February 2003 and launched its terrestrial broadcast on 13 May 2003 as well as regular broadcasting via satellite.

The station's motto is "a means of social communication, not media manipulation". The station is funded by donations from viewers, listeners of Radio Maryja, readers of "Nasz Dziennik" (Our Journal) and sales of satellite television receivers. In contrast to Radio Maryja, TV Trwam does not have the status of "public broadcaster" and can place advertisements.

The station broadcasts news and social affairs as well as political, religious and musical programming.

== See also ==
- Catholic television
- Catholic television channels
- Catholic television networks
- Media in Poland
- Politics of Poland
- Radio Maryja
