= Częstochowa =

City in southern Poland

- City county
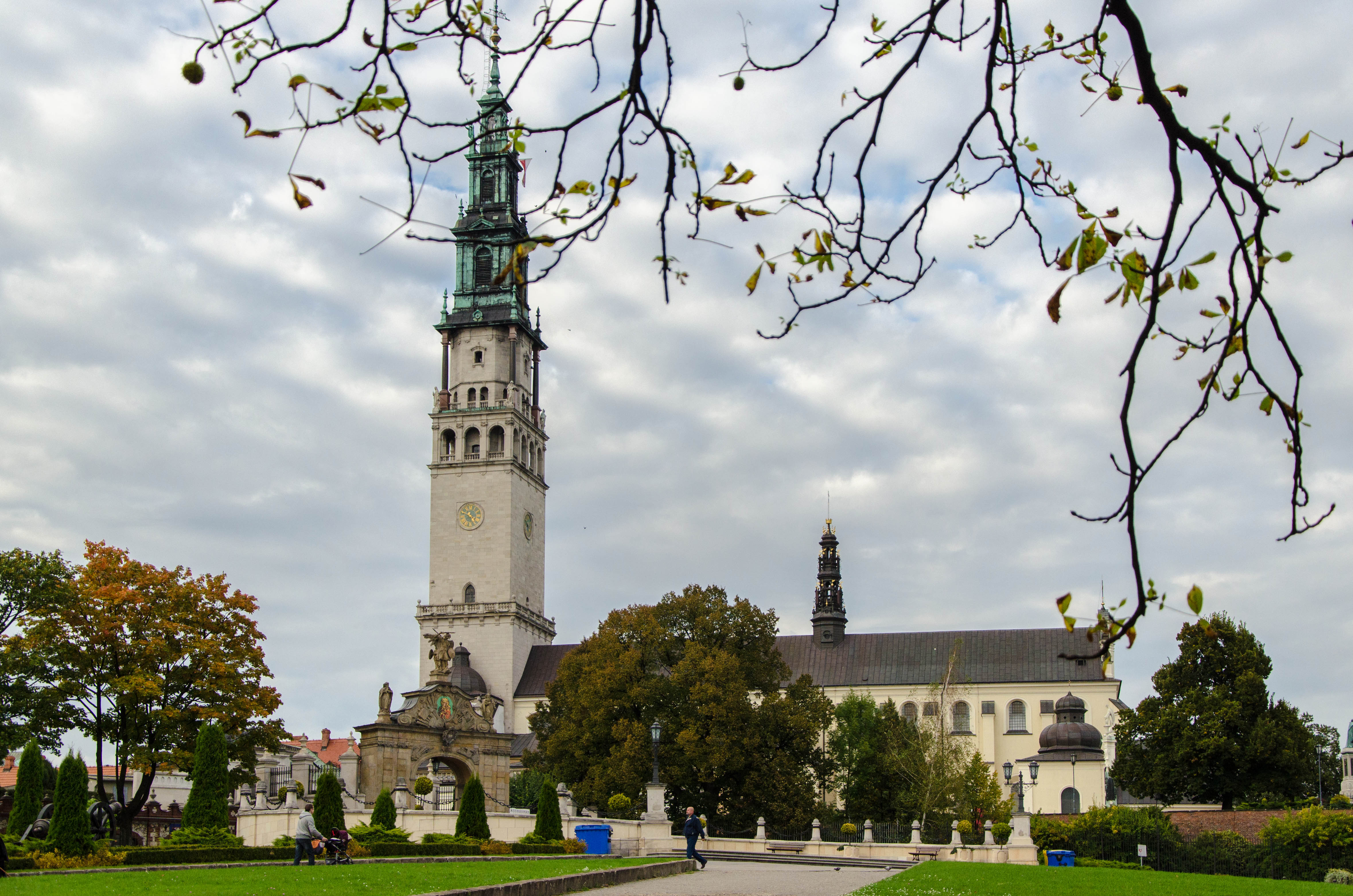
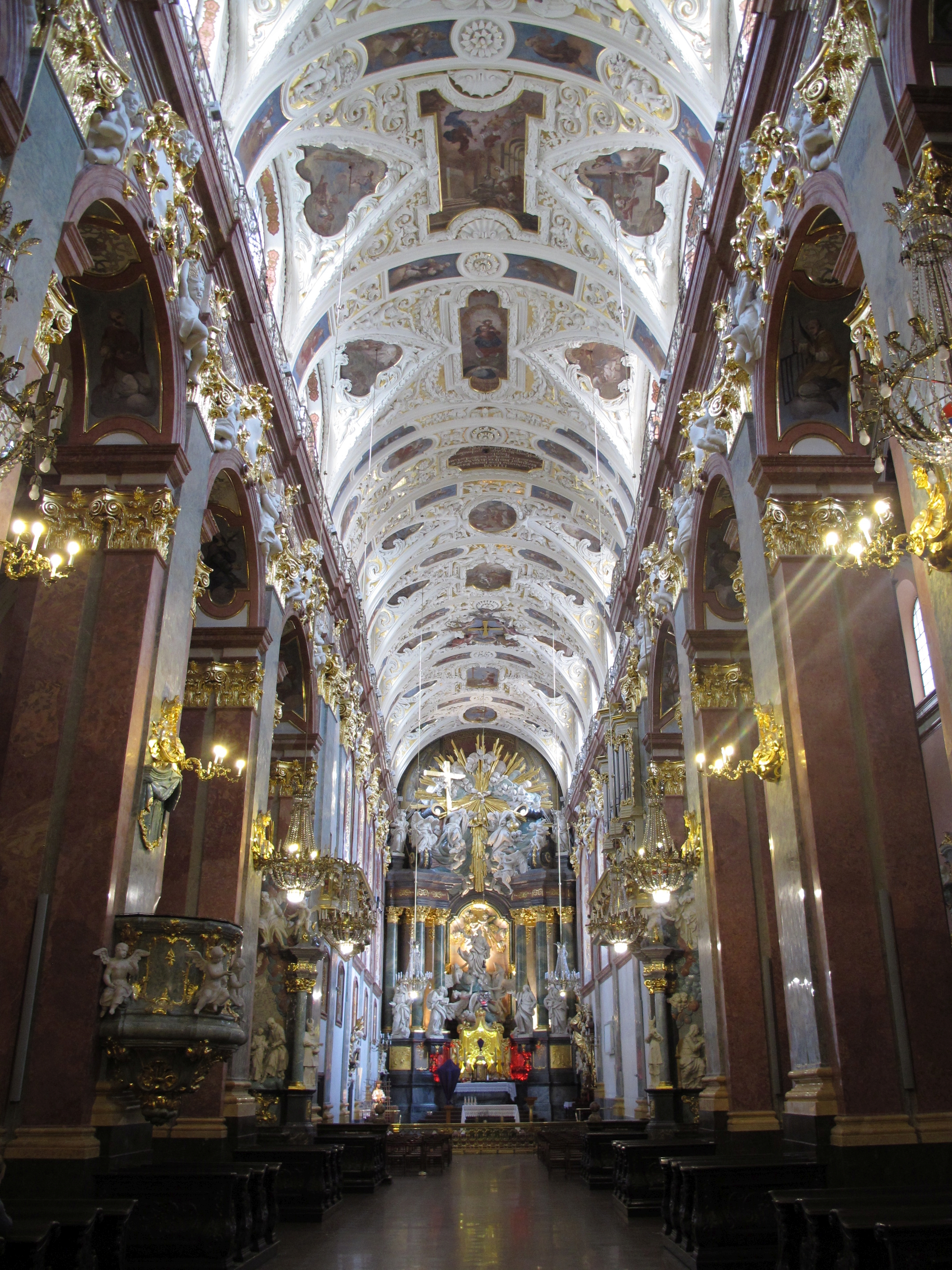
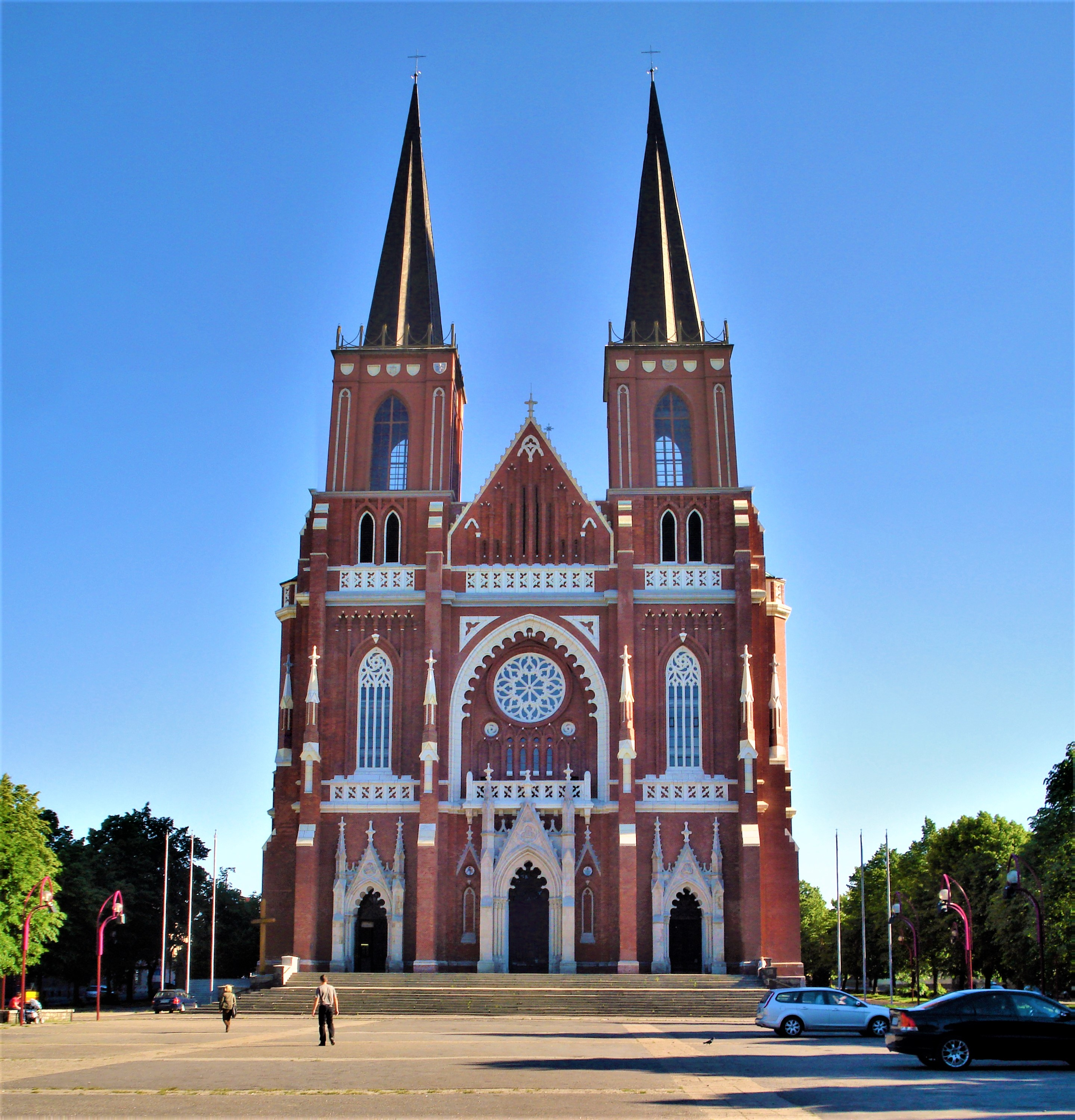
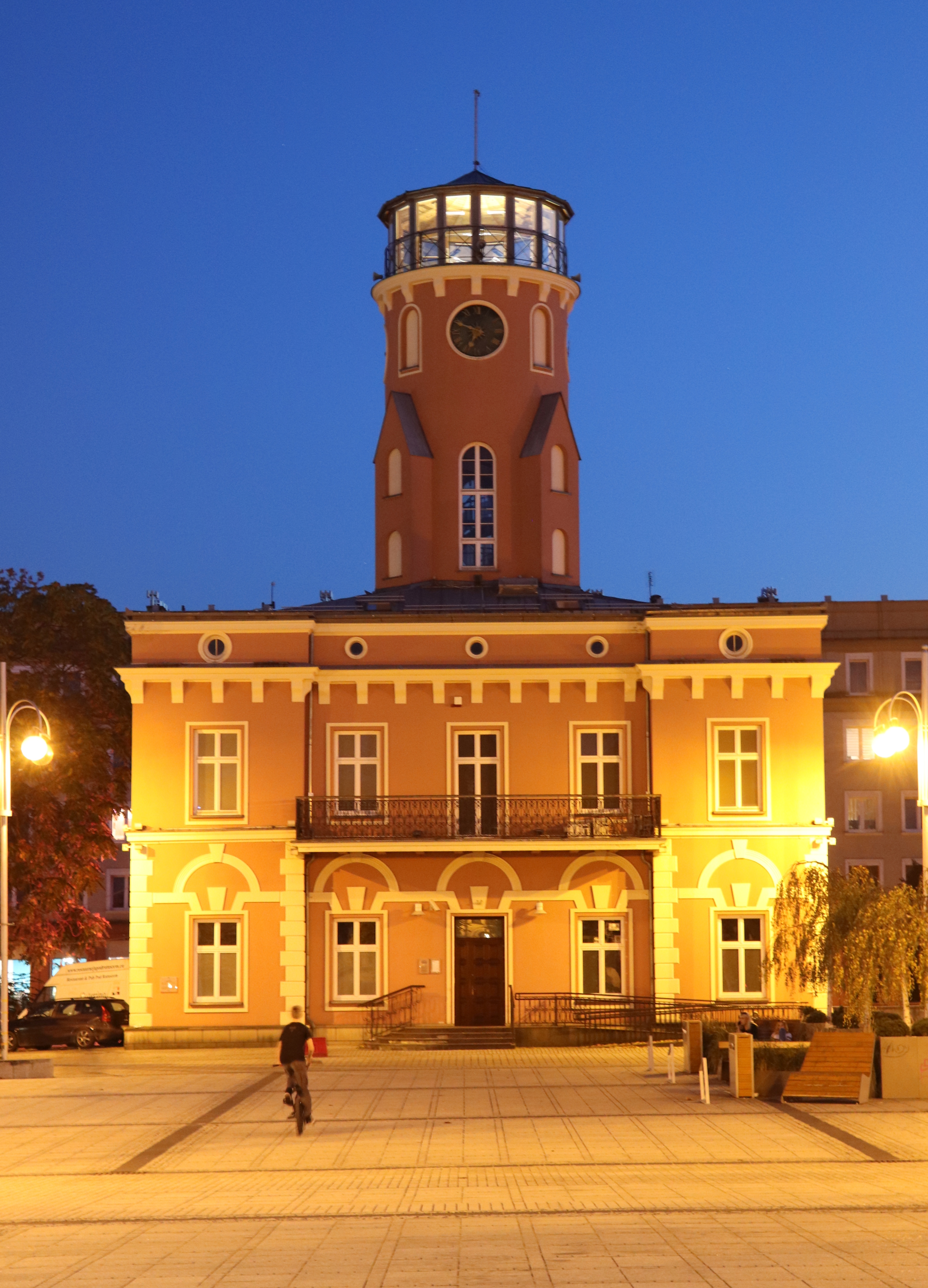
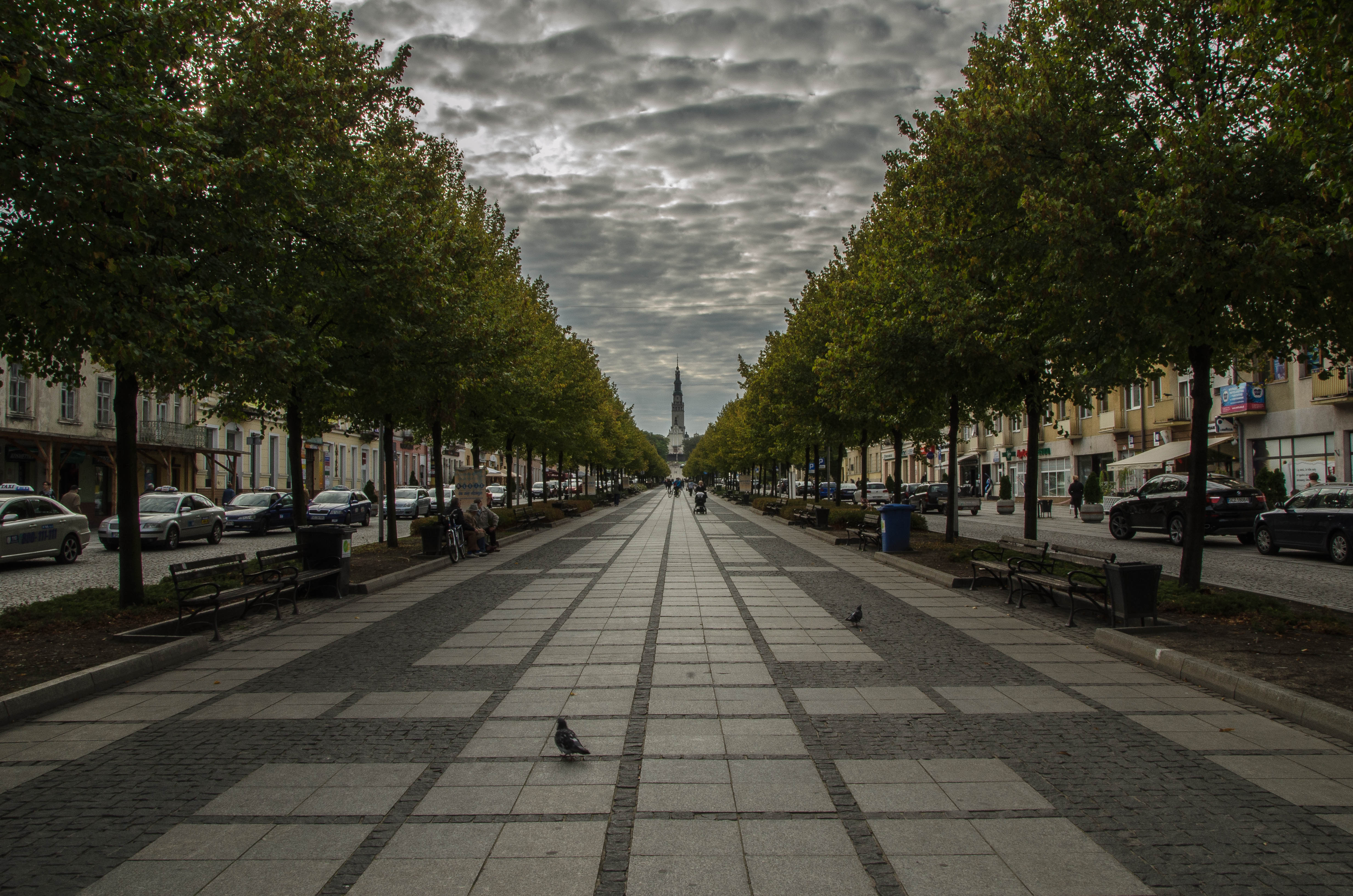
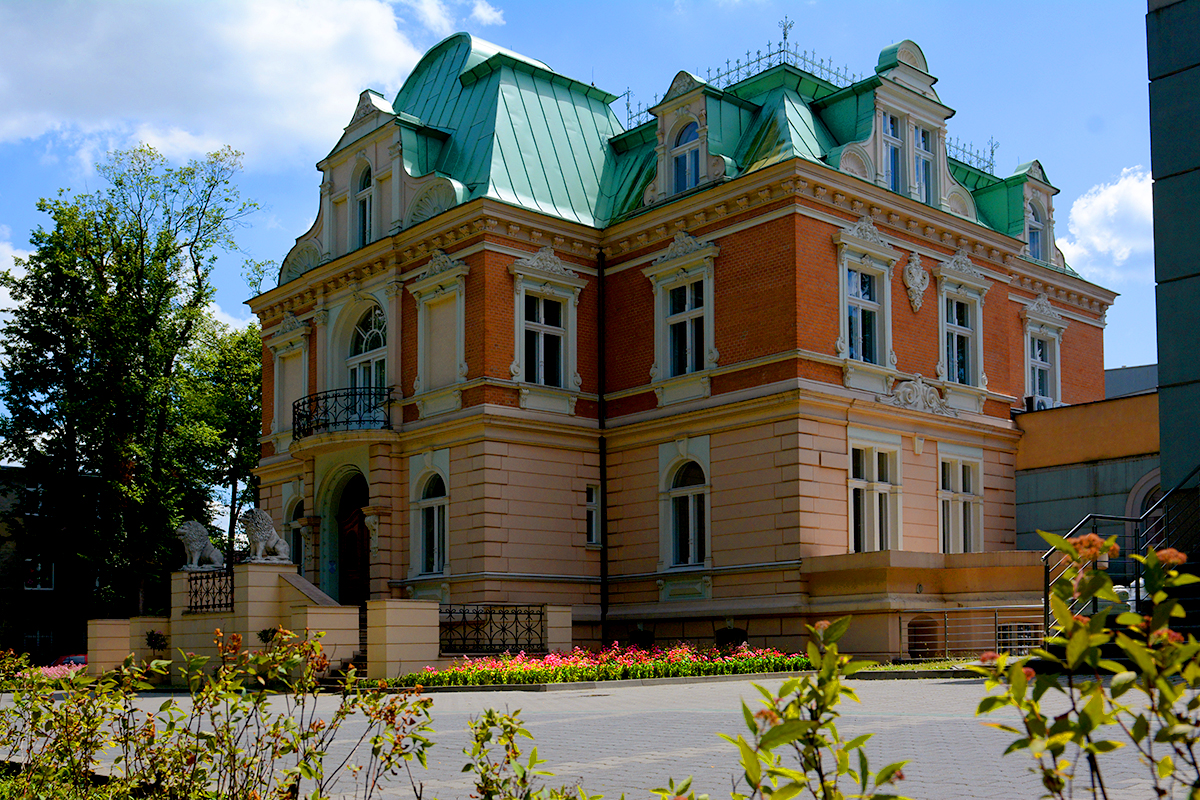
- Jasna Góra Monastery Monastery interior Cathedral City Hall Saint Mary Avenue Youth Culture Center

- Flag Coat of arms Wordmark
- Motto: Jasne, że Częstochowa (Of course Częstochowa) Częstochowa, it's clear (used as an English translation of the former motto)
- Location within Poland
- Coordinates: 50°48′N 19°7′E
- Country: Poland
- Voivodeship: Silesian
- County: city county
- Established: 11th century
- City rights: 1356

Government
  - Body: Częstochowa City Council
  - City mayor: Krzysztof Matyjaszczyk (L)

Area
  - Total: 160 km^{2} (62 sq mi)

Population (31 December 2021)
  - Total: 214,342 ▼ (13th)
  - Density: 1,380/km^{2} (3,600/sq mi)
- Demonym(s): częstochowianin (male) częstochowianka (female) (pl)
- Time zone: UTC+1 (CET)
  - Summer (DST): UTC+2 (CEST)
- Postal code: 42-200 to 42-229, 42-263, 42-271, 42-280, 42-294
- Area code: +48 34
- Car plates: SC
- Climate: Dfb
- Website: https://www.czestochowa.pl/

Częstochowa (/ˌtʃɛnstəˈkoʊvə/ CHEN-stə-KOH-və, Polish: [t͡ʂɛ̃stɔˈxɔva]) is a city in southern Poland on the Warta with 214,342 inhabitants, making it the thirteenth-largest city in Poland. It is situated in the Silesian Voivodeship. However, Częstochowa is historically part of Lesser Poland, not Silesia, and before the 1795 Partition of Poland, it belonged to the Kraków Voivodeship. Częstochowa is located in the Kraków-Częstochowa Upland. It is the largest economic, cultural and administrative hub in the northern part of the Silesian Voivodeship.

The city is known for the famous Jasna Góra Monastery of the Order of Saint Paul the First Hermit of the Catholic Church, which is the home of the Black Madonna of Częstochowa, a shrine to Mary, mother of Jesus. Every year, millions of pilgrims from all over the world come to Częstochowa to see it.

Częstochowa was also home to Frankism in the late 18th and 19th centuries, an antinomian Sabbatean movement of Rabbinic Judaism that led to a mass conversion to Catholicism.

The city excavated an ancient site of the Lusatian culture, with a museum devoted to it. The ruins of a medieval Royal Castle stand in Olsztyn, approximately 25 kilometres (16 miles) from the city centre (see also Trail of the Eagles' Nests).

== City name ==
The name of Częstochowa means 'Częstoch's place' and comes from a personal name of Częstoch, mentioned in the medieval documents also as Częstobor and Częstomir. Variations of the name include Czanstochowa used in 1220, and Częstochow used in 1382 and 1558. A part of today's city called Częstochówka was a separate municipality mentioned in the 14th century as the Old Częstochowa (Antiquo Czanstochowa, 1382) and Częstochówka in 1470–80. The city was also known in German as Tschenstochau, in Russian as Ченстохов (Chenstokhov), and in Yiddish as טשענסטאָכאָוו (Tshenstokhov).

== History ==
A Lusatian culture cemetery from around 750–550 BC is located in the present-day district of Raków and it is now an Archaeological Reserve, a branch of the Częstochowa Museum.

=== Middle Ages ===
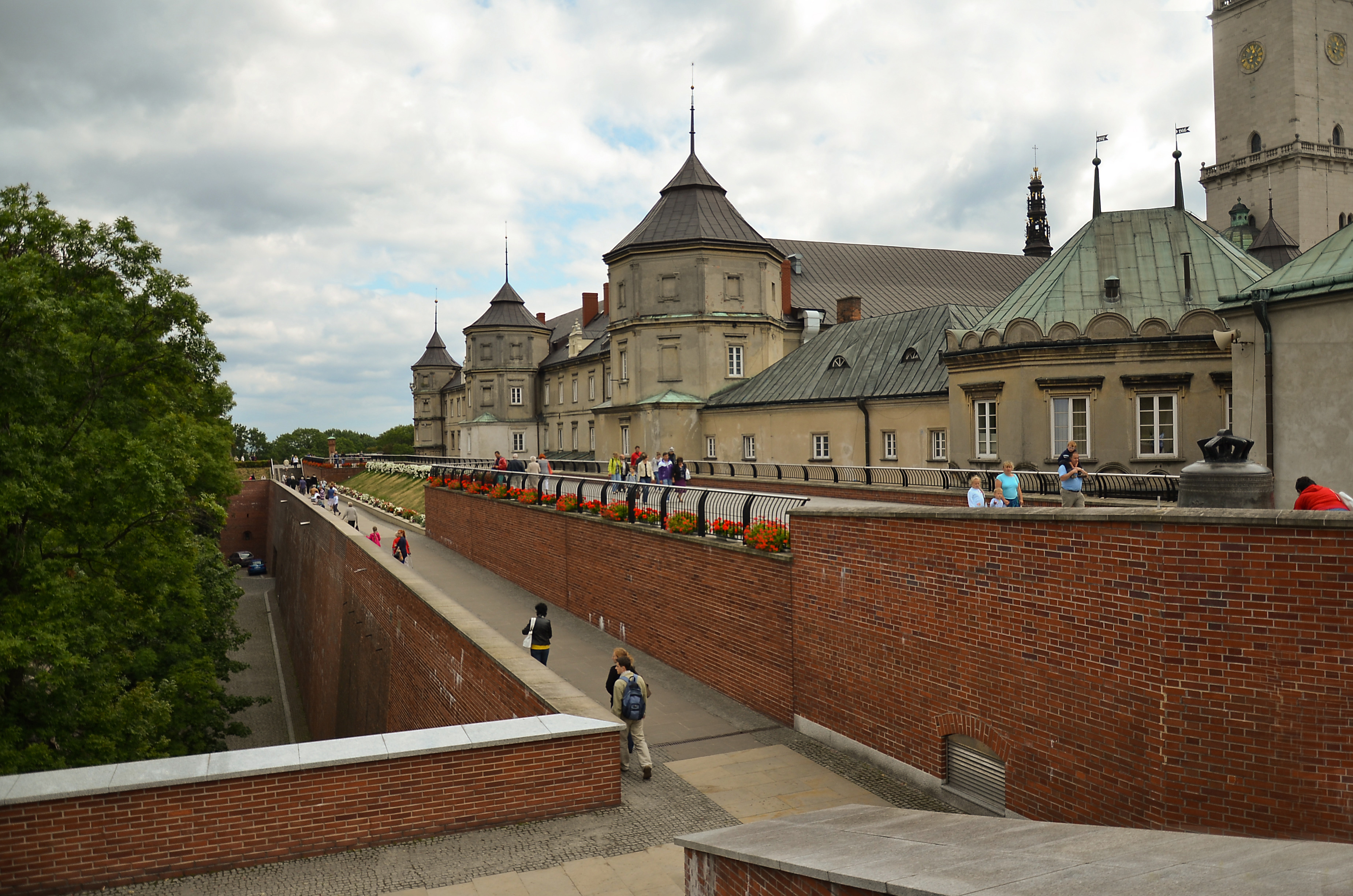
Fortifications of the Jasna Góra Monastery

According to archaeological findings, the first medieval settlement in the location of Częstochowa was established in the late 11th century within Piast-ruled Poland. It was first mentioned in historical documents from 1220, when Bishop of Kraków Iwo Odrowąż made a list of properties of the Mstów monastery. Two villages, Częstochowa and Częstochówka were mentioned in the document. Both of them belonged to the basic territorial unit of Slavic Polish tribes (opole), with its capital at Mstów. Częstochówka was located on a hill, where the Jasna Góra Monastery was later built.

In the late 13th century Częstochowa became the seat of a Roman Catholic parish church, which was under the Lelów deanery. The village was located in the northwestern corner of Kraków Land, Lesser Poland, near the Royal Castle at Olsztyn. Częstochowa developed along a busy merchant road from Lesser Poland to Greater Poland. The village was ruled by a starosta, who stayed at the Olsztyn Castle.

It is not known when Częstochowa was granted a town charter, as no documents have been preserved. It happened sometime between 1356 and 1377. In 1502, King Alexander Jagiellon granted a new charter, based on Magdeburg rights to Częstochowa. In 1382 the Paulist monastery of Jasna Góra was founded by Vladislaus II of Opole – the Polish Piast prince of Upper Silesia. Two years later the monastery received its now-famous Black Madonna icon of the Virgin Mary; in subsequent years became a centre of pilgrimage, contributing to the growth of the adjacent town.

Historical population
Year	Pop.	±%
1950	112,198	—
1960	164,906	+47.0%
1970	188,189	+14.1%
1980	234,681	+24.7%
1990	257,957	+9.9%
2000	253,133	−1.9%
2010	238,042	−6.0%
2020	217,530	−8.6%

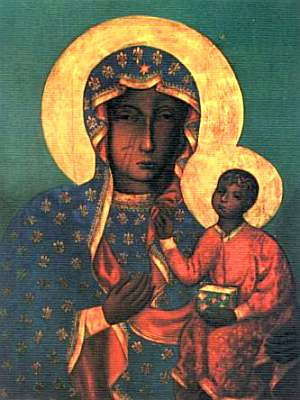
The Black Madonna of Częstochowa

=== Early modern period ===
Częstochowa prospered in the late 15th and early 16th centuries, due to efforts of Sigismund I the Old, the future king of Polish–Lithuanian Commonwealth. At that time, Sigismund ruled the Duchy of Głogów, and frequently visited Częstochowa on his way to the duchy (1498, 1502, 1502, 1503, 1505, 1505, 1506). In 1504, Częstochowa was granted the right to collect tolls on the Warta river bridge. In 1508, Częstochowa was allowed to organise one fair a year; in 1564, the number of fairs was increased to three annually, and in 1639 to six. In the year 1631, Częstochowa had 399 houses, but at the same time, several residents died in a plague, after which 78 houses were abandoned.

In the first half of the 17th century, kings of the House of Vasa turned the Jasna Góra Monastery into a modern Dutch-style fortress. During the Swedish invasion of Poland in 1655, the monastery was one of the pockets of Polish resistance against the Swedish armies (for more information, see Siege of Jasna Góra). The town of Częstochowa was almost completely destroyed by Swedish soldiers. It has been estimated that the town lost 50% of the population, and 60% of houses. But the town suffered less severe destruction than nearby towns like Przyrów, Olsztyn and Mstów. It took several years for Częstochowa to recover from these extensive losses. As late as in the 1680s there still were ruined houses in the town.

At the same time, the Jasna Góra Monastery prospered. On 27 February 1670 the wedding of King Michał Korybut Wiśniowiecki to Princess Eleonore of Austria took place here. In 1682 the celebration of the 300th anniversary of the Black Madonna of Częstochowa brought thousands of pilgrims from both Polish–Lithuanian Commonwealth and Silesia. The Jewish community in Częstochowa developed by about 1700.

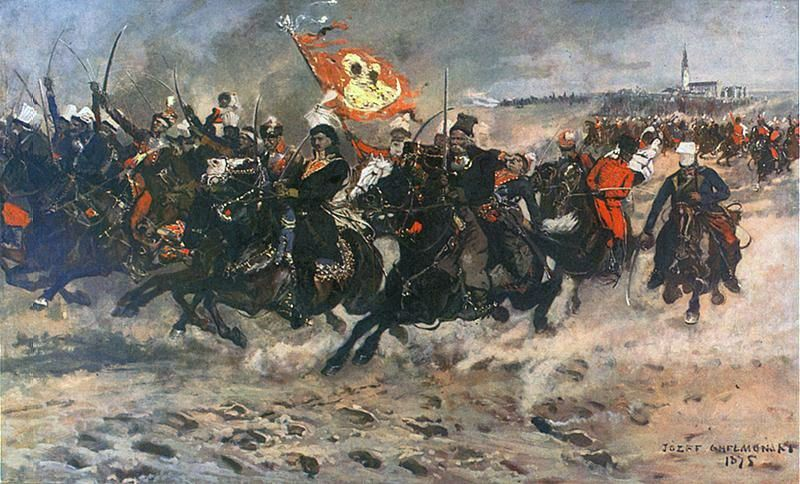
Kazimierz Pulaski and the Bar Confederation 1772 defence of Częstochowa. Painting by Chełmoński.

During the Great Northern War, Częstochowa was captured by the Swedish army on 11 August 1702. In February 1703 Swedes besieged the monastery, but failed to seize it. In April 1705 the Swedes returned, and appeared at the monastery again in September 1709. Unable to capture the fortified stronghold, they looted villages in the area, set Częstochowa on fire, and left towards Wieluń. At that time, a village of Częstochówka also existed next to Częstochowa. The village belonged to the monastery and quickly developed. In 1717 it was granted town charter, and its name was changed into Nowa Częstochowa (New Częstochowa). The town was completely destroyed during the Bar Confederation. On 8 February 1769 the monastery was seized by rebels of the Bar Confederation, commanded by Kazimierz Pułaski. Soon the stronghold was besieged by Russians under German-born General Johann von Drewitz. The Russians gave up on 15 January 1771.

In 1789, the population of Częstochowa (also called Stara Częstochowa, Old Częstochowa) was app. 1,600, which was less than in the 15th century. After the Great Sejm passed the Constitution of 3 May 1791, local Sejmiks were obliged to legitimize it. On 14–15 February 1792, a sejmik of the szlachta of northern part of Kraków Voivodeship (counties of Lelów and Książ Wielki) took place in Częstochowa. Traditionally, local sejmiks were organized in Żarnowiec; the fact that it was moved to Częstochowa confirms the growing importance of the town.

In 1760, Jacob Frank, the leader of a Jewish sect mixing Kabbalah, Catholicism and Islam, was imprisoned for heresy in the monastery by the church. His followers settled near him, later establishing a cult of his daughter Eve Frank. In August 1772, Frank was released by the Russian general Aleksandr Bibikov, who had occupied the city. Frank had promised the Russians that he would convince Jews to convert to Orthodox Christianity.

=== Partitions of Poland ===
During the Second Partition of Poland, Częstochowa was seized by the Kingdom of Prussia in 1793, and incorporated into the newly formed province of South Prussia, Department of Kalisz. The Old Częstochowa became the seat of a county (see Districts of Prussia). During the Napoleonic Wars, in 1807 Częstochowa became part of the Duchy of Warsaw. In 1815 it came under Russian-controlled Congress Poland, in which it remained until World War I. Old Częstochowa remained the seat of a county in 1807–1830. In 1809, the monastery was unsuccessfully besieged by Austrians (see Polish–Austrian War). On 2 April 1813 Jasna Góra was seized by the Russians (see War of the Sixth Coalition), after a two-week siege, and the fortifications were razed that year.

In 1821, the government of Congress Poland carried out a census, according to which the population of New Częstochowa was 1,036, while the population of Old Częstochowa was 2,758. Furthermore, almost four hundred people lived in several settlements in the area (Zawodzie, Stradom, Kucelin). The idea of a merger of both towns was first brought up in 1815. In 1819, military architect Jan Bernhard planned and started the construction of Aleja Najświętszej Panny Marii—the Holy Virgin Mary Avenue, which is the main arterial road of the modern city. It connected Old Częstochowa with New Częstochowa.

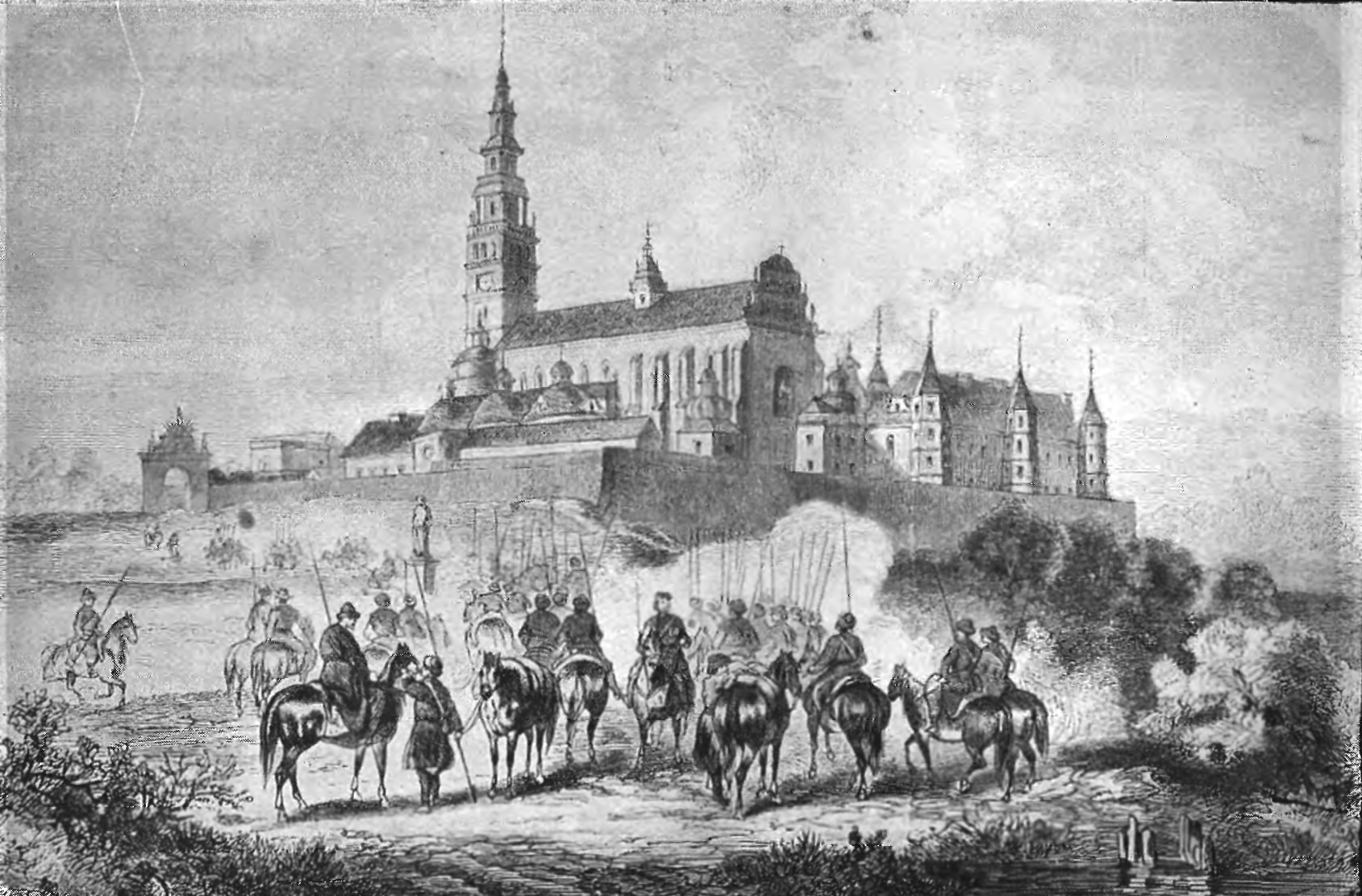
Polish insurgents in Częstochowa during the January Uprising

Finally, the two towns were officially merged on 19 August 1826. The new city quickly emerged as the fourth-largest urban centre of Congress Poland; surpassed only by the cities of Warsaw, Lublin, and Kalisz. On 8 September 1862 a patriotic rally took place in the city, in front of St. Sigismund church. As a reprisal, Russian military authorities destroyed app. 65% of Częstochowa's Old Town, and introduced martial law . During the January Uprising, several skirmishes took place in the area of Częstochowa, with the last one taking place on 4 July 1864 near Chorzenice.

In 1846 the Warsaw-Vienna Railway line was opened, linking the city with the rest of Europe. After 1870 iron ore started to be developed in the area, which gave a boost to the local industry. Among the most notable investments of the epoch was the Huta Częstochowa steel mill built by Bernard Hantke, as well as several textile mills and paper factories.

In 1900, the traveling cinema of brothers Władysław and Antoni Krzemiński came to the city for the first time, after it was founded in Łódź in 1899 as the oldest Polish cinema. In 1909, they settled in Częstochowa and founded Kino Odeon, the first permanent cinema in the city.

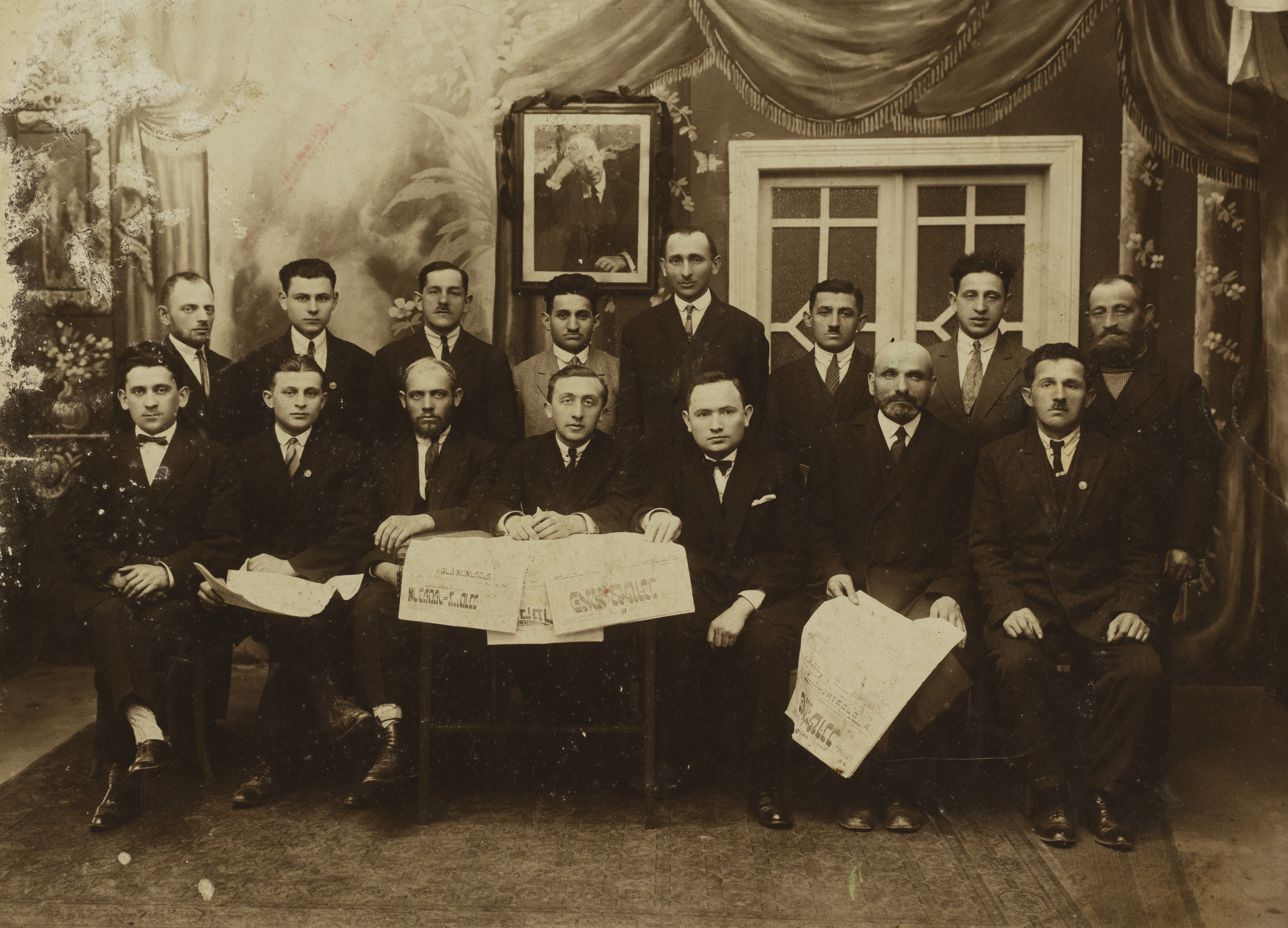
Executive Committee of the Polish Bakers' Union in Częstochowa, 1927

Up to the Second World War, like many other cities in Europe, Częstochowa had a significant Jewish population: according to Russian census of 1897, out of the total population of 45,130, Jews constituted 12,000 (so around 26% percent). An anti-Semitic pogrom occurred in 1902. A mob attacked the Jewish shops, killing fourteen Jews and one gendarme.

Częstochowa entered the 20th century as one of the leading industrial centres of Russian Poland (together with Warsaw, Łódź, and Zagłębie Dąbrowskie). The city was conveniently located on the Warta and other smaller rivers (Kucelinka, Stradomka, Konopka). Real estate and land prices were low, compared to Łódź. The monastery attracted numerous pilgrims, who also were customers of local businesses. In 1904, Częstochowa had 678 smaller workshops, which employed 2,000 workers. In 1902, rail connection to the Prussian border crossing at Herby Stare was opened, and in 1911, the line to Kielce was completed. The Revolution in the Kingdom of Poland (1905–1907) began in Częstochowa as early as May 1904, when first patriotic rallies took place. On 25 December 1904 a man named Wincenty Makowski tried to blow up a monument of Tsar Alexander II, which stood in front of the monastery. In February 1905, a general strike action was declared in the city, with workers demanding pay rises. In June 1905 street clashes took place in Częstochowa, in which 20 people were killed by Russian forces. Further protests took place in 1909 and 1912.

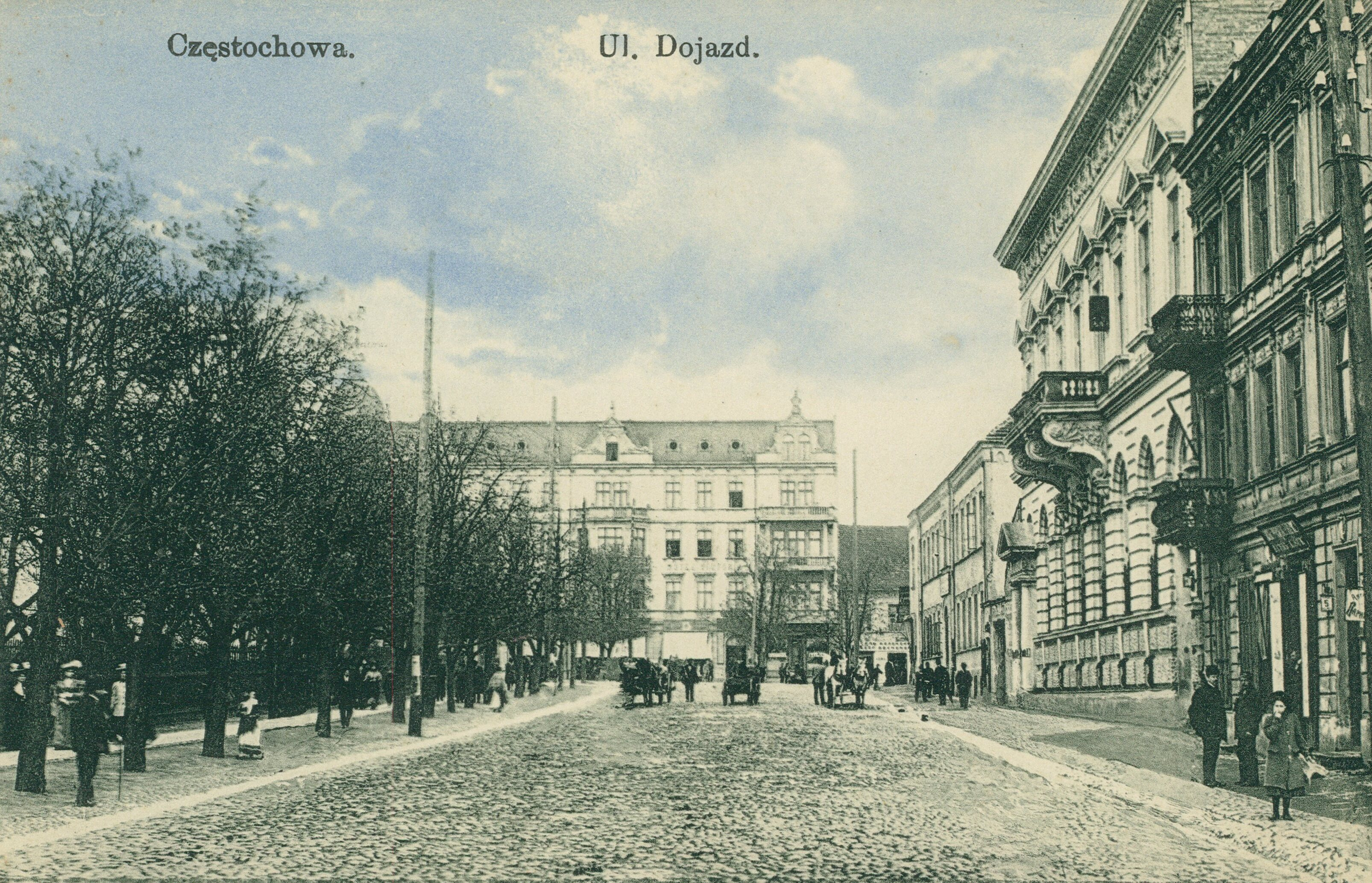
Częstochowa in the early 20th century

=== World War I ===
In early August 1914, Częstochowa was abandoned by the Imperial Russian Army, and the first units of the German Army entered the city on August 3. Four days later drunken German soldiers shot at each other; an unknown number died. Residents of the city were accused of killing Germans, and as a punishment, a number of civilians were executed. During the German occupation (1914–1918), Częstochowa was cut off from its prior Russian markets, which resulted in widespread poverty and unemployment. Furthermore, German authorities closed down several factories, urging unemployed workers to migrate to Upper Silesia, where they replaced men drafted into the army. Altogether, some 20,000 left for Upper Silesia and other provinces of the German Empire. On 2 February 1915 Częstochowa was visited by Charles I of Austria. Four days later Emperor Wilhelm II came to the city, and on 17 May 1915 Częstochowa hosted King of Saxony Frederick Augustus III.

Unlike the city of Częstochowa, since 26 April 1915 the Jasna Góra Monastery had been under the control and protection of Austria-Hungary, after the personal intervention of Emperor Franz Joseph I, who was a pious Roman Catholic. The monastery was manned by soldiers under Austrian Army Captain Josef Klettinger and remained under Austrian control until 4 November 1918. In October 1917 the City Council of Częstochowa demanded permission to destroy the monument to Tsar Alexander II, to which General Governor of Warsaw Hans Hartwig von Beseler agreed. Polish authorities established control over the entire city on 11 November 1918, the day of the re-establishment of Poland's independence.

=== Second Polish Republic ===
On 12 November 1918, three companies of the freshly created Polish Army marched along the Holy Virgin Mary Avenue. In 1919–1921, Częstochowa was one of the centres of support of Silesian Poles fighting in the Silesian Uprisings. On 4 December 1920 Symon Petliura arrived, together with app. 2,000 Ukrainian soldiers. Their arrival spurred widespread protests, as the city already had a desperate food situation and was obliged to house and feed the Ukrainians.

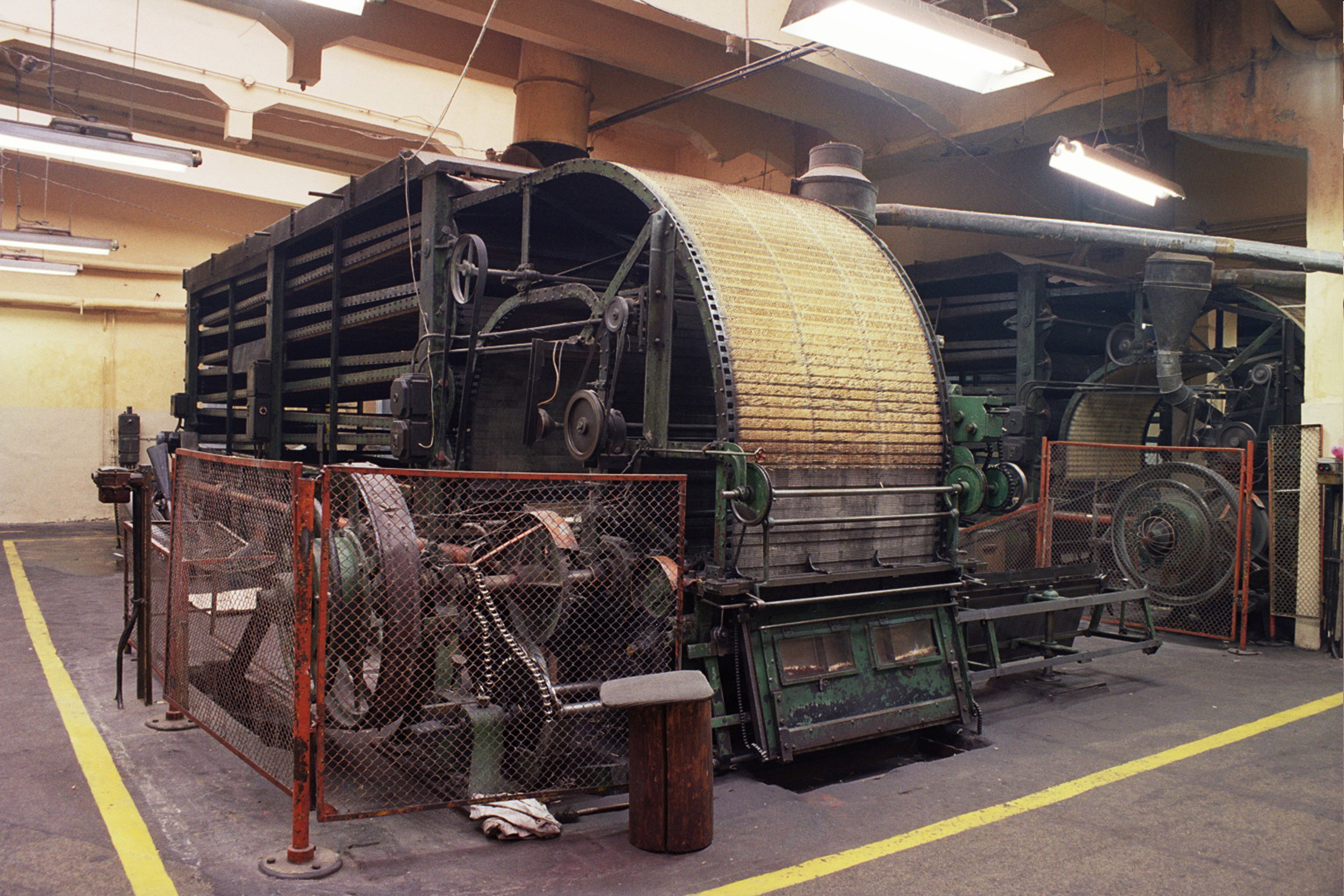
Match factory modernized in the 1920s, now a museum

In the Second Polish Republic, Częstochowa belonged to Kielce Voivodeship (Kieleckie), where from 1928 it constituted the City County of Częstochowa. In the 1920s, local industry still suffered from World War I losses, and having been cut off from Russian markets. Unemployment remained high, and thousands of workers left for France in search of work. The Great Depression was particularly difficult, resulting in strikes and workers' street clashes with the police.

In 1925, the Roman Catholic Archdiocese of Częstochowa was created. The city grew in size, when between 1928 and 1934, several local settlements and villages were incorporated into city limits. In 1939, the population of Częstochowa was 138,000, which made it the eighth-largest city of Poland. In 1938, the Polish government announced plans to liquidate Kielce Voivodeship, and create Sandomierz Voivodeship, based on Central Industrial Area. According to these plans, Częstochowa was to be transferred either to Łódź Voivodeship, or Silesian Voivodeship, together with Zagłębie Dąbrowskie.

=== World War II ===
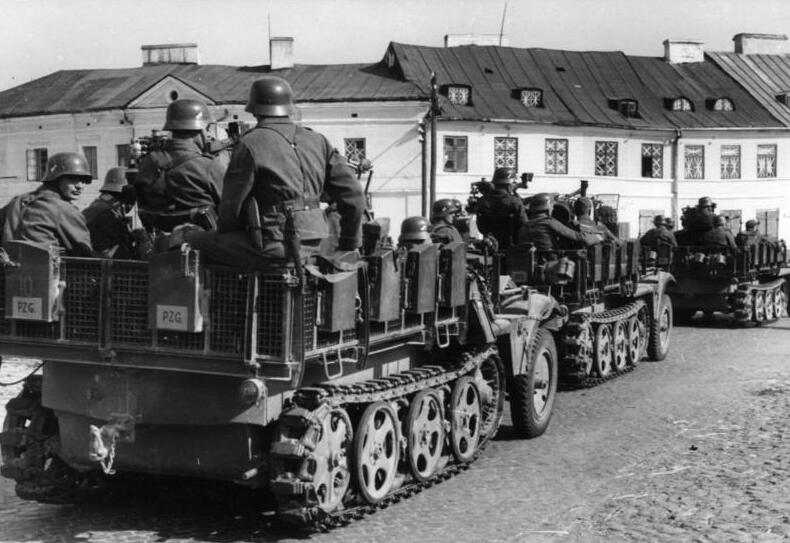
German troops in Częstochowa during the invasion of Poland

In the Polish Defensive War of 1939, Częstochowa was defended by the 7th Infantry Division, part of northern wing of Kraków Army. After the Battle of Mokra and other battles, Polish forces withdrew, and the Wehrmacht entered the city on Sunday 3 September 1939. Częstochowa was renamed by the Germans as Tschenstochau, and incorporated into the General Government. Monday 4 September 1939 became known as Bloody Monday or also Częstochowa massacre. The Germans killed 227 people (205 ethnic Poles and 22 Jews) in various places in the city, including the town hall courtyard, town squares and at a local factory (some estimates of victims put the number at more than 1,000; 990 ethnic Poles and 110 Jews).

From the beginning of the occupation, the Germans initiated a plan of cultural and physical extermination of the Polish nation (see Nazi crimes against the Polish nation). By a decision of 5 September 1939, one of the first three German special courts in occupied Poland was established in the city. On 6 September 1939 the Einsatzgruppe II entered the city to commit atrocities against the population. On 14–15 September 1939 the Germans arrested around 200 inhabitants of the district of Stradom. In order to terrorize the Polish population, on 9–11 November 1939 the Germans carried out mass arrests of dozens of Poles, including the mayor, vice-mayor, teachers, students, activists and local officials, but they were soon released. During the AB-Aktion, the Germans carried out mass arrests of Poles in March, June and August 1940, and also imprisoned 60 Poles from Radomsko and the Radomsko County in the local prison in March 1940. Arrested Poles were then either deported to the Sachsenhausen, Buchenwald and Ravensbrück concentration camps or massacred in the nearby forests of Olsztyn and Apolonka. Among the victims of the massacres committed in Olsztyn were school principals, teachers, lawyers, policemen, merchants, craftsmen, pharmacists, engineers, students and local officials, and among the victims of the Apolonka massacres were 20 girl scouts. Further executions of local Poles were carried out by the Germans throughout the war.

Over 100 Poles from Częstochowa, including civil servants, policemen, doctors, teachers, school principals and engineers, were murdered by the Russians in the Katyn massacre in 1940.

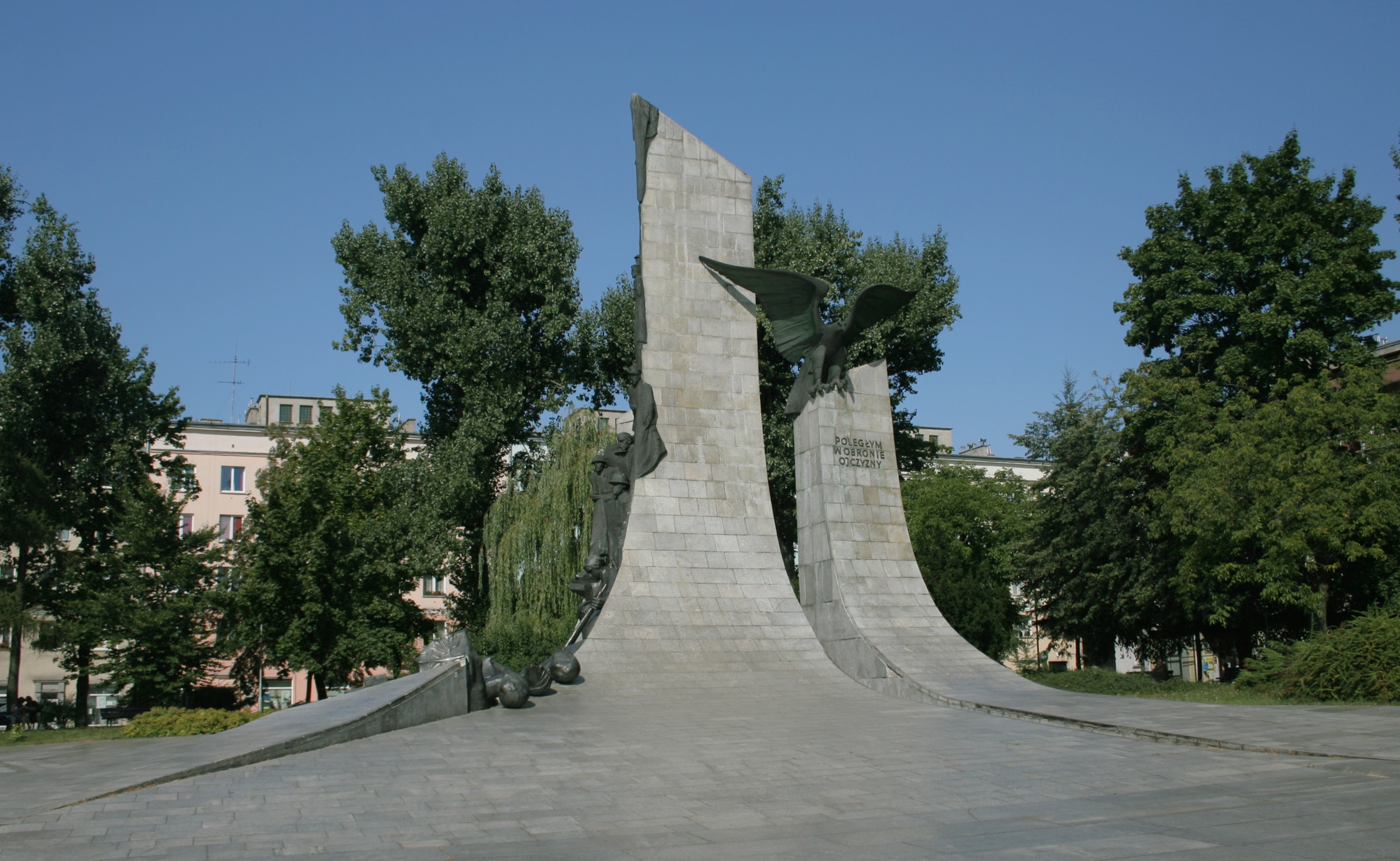
Monument dedicated to the fallen defenders of Poland in the Polish–Soviet War and World War II

Under German occupation Częstochowa administratively was a city-county (Stadkreis Tschenstochau), part of the Radom District of the General Government. The Polish resistance movement was active in the city, and units of the Home Army and National Armed Forces (NSZ) operated in its area. A branch of the secret Polish University of the Western Lands was located in the city, and it secretly continued Polish education. The secret Polish Council to Aid Jews "Żegota", established by the Polish resistance movement operated in the city. On 20 April 1943 a NZS unit attacked the local office of the Bank Emisyjny w Polsce. After the collapse of the Warsaw Uprising, Częstochowa was briefly the capital of the Polish Underground State.

On 9 April 1941 the Nazis created a ghetto for Jews in the city. Approximately 45,000 of Częstochowa's Jews, almost the entire community, were killed by the Germans. Life in German-occupied Częstochowa is depicted in the Pulitzer Prize-winning graphic novel Maus, by Art Spiegelman, the son of a Jewish Częstochowa resident. Before the Holocaust, Częstochowa was considered a great Jewish centre in Poland. By the end of World War II, nearly all Jews had been killed or deported to extermination camps to be killed, making Częstochowa what Nazi Germany called judenfrei. There are known cases of local Polish men and women, who were captured and persecuted by the Germans for rescuing and aiding Jews. These Poles were sentenced to death, prison or concentration camps, in which some died, some survived, while the fate of many remains unknown. Poles who saved Jews in other places in the region were also either sentenced to death by the local German court or incarcerated in the local prison. The Germans also tried to obscure the Catholic shrine and pilgrim devotion by renaming the road leading to the pilgrimage church after Hitler, though they did allow some pilgrimage activity to continue.

From 1941 to 1944, the German occuying administration operated the Stalag 367 prisoner-of-war camp for Italian and Soviet POWs in the city. During and after the Warsaw Uprising, in August–October 1944, the Germans deported thousands of Varsovians from the Dulag 121 camp in Pruszków, where they were initially imprisoned, to Częstochowa. Those Poles were mainly old people, ill people and women with children. In late December 1944, there were 14,671 registered Poles, who were expelled from Warsaw.

In the autumn 1944, Germans fortified the city, preparing for a lengthy defence. On January 16, 1945, however, the Wehrmacht retreated after just one day of fighting. The city was restored to Poland, however, with a Soviet-installed communist regime, which remained in power until the Fall of Communism in the 1980s.

=== Recent period ===
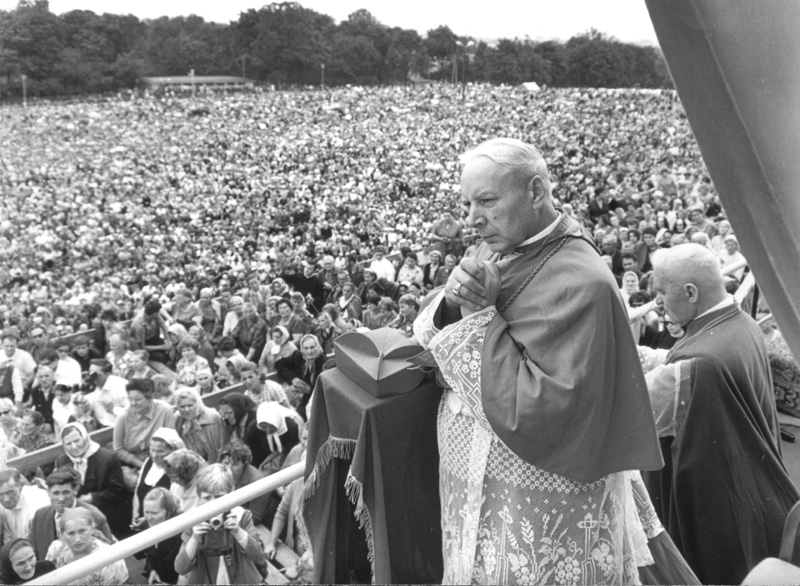
Celebration of the 1000th anniversary of the baptism of Poland with the participation of Primate of Poland Stefan Wyszyński in 1966

Due to the communist idea of fast industrialisation, the steel mill was significantly expanded and named after Bolesław Bierut. This, combined with the growing tourist movement, led to yet another period of fast city growth, concluded in 1975 with the creation of a separate Częstochowa Voivodeship. In the immediate post-war period, Częstochowa belonged to Kielce Voivodeship (1945–1950), and then the city was transferred to Katowice Voivodeship. In the Polish People's Republic, Częstochowa emerged not only as an industrial, but also academic centre of the region. The city expanded, with the first tram lines opened in 1959. On 1 January 1977 several villages and settlements were included within Częstochowa city limits. As a result, the area of the city expanded from 90 to 160 square kilometres (35 to 62 sq mi).

Pope John Paul II, prayed before the Black Madonna during his historic visit to his Polish homeland in 1979, several months after his election to the Chair of Peter. The Pope made another visit to Our Lady of Częstochowa in 1983 and again in 1987, 1991, 1997 and 1999. On 15 August 1991 John Paul II was named Honorary Citizen of Częstochowa. In 1998, the city was awarded the Europe Prize by the Parliamentary Assembly of the Council of Europe for having made exceptional efforts to spread the ideal of European unity. On 26 May 2006 the city was visited by Pope Benedict XVI.

== Climate ==
The climate is humid continental (Köppen: Dfb), but still with some oceanic characteristics (Cfb), especially in recent normals. Częstochowa is in one of the hottest summer regions in Poland; although its winters are not the most rigorous, they are colder than the more moderate climates of the west and the Baltic Sea.

On average, there are four hours a day with direct solar radiation. In the course of the year, the best insolation is observed in June, due to the greatest length of the day. There are few windless days in Częstochowa. Lull periods on an annual scale account for an average of 9.2%. Western winds prevail here – 18% and south-west – 18.2%. At the same time, they achieve the highest speeds from these directions – 2.2 m/s. The northern winds are least common – 7.7% and north-eastern winds – 7.4%.

Climate data for Częstochowa (Parkitka), elevation: 293 m, 1991–2020 normals, extremes 1951–present
Month	Jan	Feb	Mar	Apr	May	Jun	Jul	Aug	Sep	Oct	Nov	Dec	Year
Record high °C (°F)	13.4 (56.1)	18.4 (65.1)	23.1 (73.6)	29.5 (85.1)	34.1 (93.4)	35.6 (96.1)	36.0 (96.8)	36.9 (98.4)	33.7 (92.7)	27.0 (80.6)	20.1 (68.2)	16.6 (61.9)	36.9 (98.4)
Mean daily maximum °C (°F)	1.3 (34.3)	3.1 (37.6)	7.7 (45.9)	14.5 (58.1)	19.4 (66.9)	22.6 (72.7)	24.7 (76.5)	24.5 (76.1)	19.0 (66.2)	13.2 (55.8)	7.2 (45.0)	2.3 (36.1)	13.3 (55.9)
Daily mean °C (°F)	−1.4 (29.5)	−0.4 (31.3)	3.4 (38.1)	9.4 (48.9)	13.8 (56.8)	17.5 (63.5)	19.3 (66.7)	18.9 (66.0)	14.0 (57.2)	8.9 (48.0)	4.2 (39.6)	0.1 (32.2)	9.0 (48.2)
Mean daily minimum °C (°F)	−3.9 (25.0)	−3.1 (26.4)	−0.4 (31.3)	4.3 (39.7)	8.8 (47.8)	12.4 (54.3)	14.3 (57.7)	14.0 (57.2)	9.7 (49.5)	5.5 (41.9)	1.6 (34.9)	−2.4 (27.7)	5.1 (41.2)
Record low °C (°F)	−26.6 (−15.9)	−29.9 (−21.8)	−20.9 (−5.6)	−6.2 (20.8)	−2.9 (26.8)	0.8 (33.4)	4.6 (40.3)	5.2 (41.4)	−0.9 (30.4)	−6.5 (20.3)	−15.4 (4.3)	−23.2 (−9.8)	−29.9 (−21.8)
Average precipitation mm (inches)	35.7 (1.41)	33.1 (1.30)	40.3 (1.59)	43.2 (1.70)	74.9 (2.95)	79.2 (3.12)	93.7 (3.69)	62.1 (2.44)	60.8 (2.39)	48.3 (1.90)	41.8 (1.65)	34.9 (1.37)	647.9 (25.51)
Average extreme snow depth cm (inches)	8.8 (3.5)	9.0 (3.5)	6.5 (2.6)	1.8 (0.7)	0.3 (0.1)	0.0 (0.0)	0.0 (0.0)	0.0 (0.0)	0.0 (0.0)	0.6 (0.2)	2.7 (1.1)	4.7 (1.9)	9.0 (3.5)
Average precipitation days (≥ 0.1 mm)	17.73	15.73	15.69	12.57	14.52	14.23	15.17	12.33	12.20	14.37	15.17	17.27	176.97
Average snowy days (≥ 0 cm)	17.8	16.0	8.0	1.3	0.0	0.0	0.0	0.0	0.0	0.4	4.7	14.1	62.3
Average relative humidity (%)	86.2	82.2	75.9	67.2	69.7	69.9	70.3	71.5	77.8	82.6	86.7	87.4	77.3
Mean monthly sunshine hours	50.8	66.0	121.7	185.8	231.4	233.9	245.4	237.8	166.8	111.2	54.5	40.4	1,745.8
Source 1: Institute of Meteorology and Water Management
Source 2: Meteomodel.pl (records, relative humidity 1991–2020)

== Economy ==
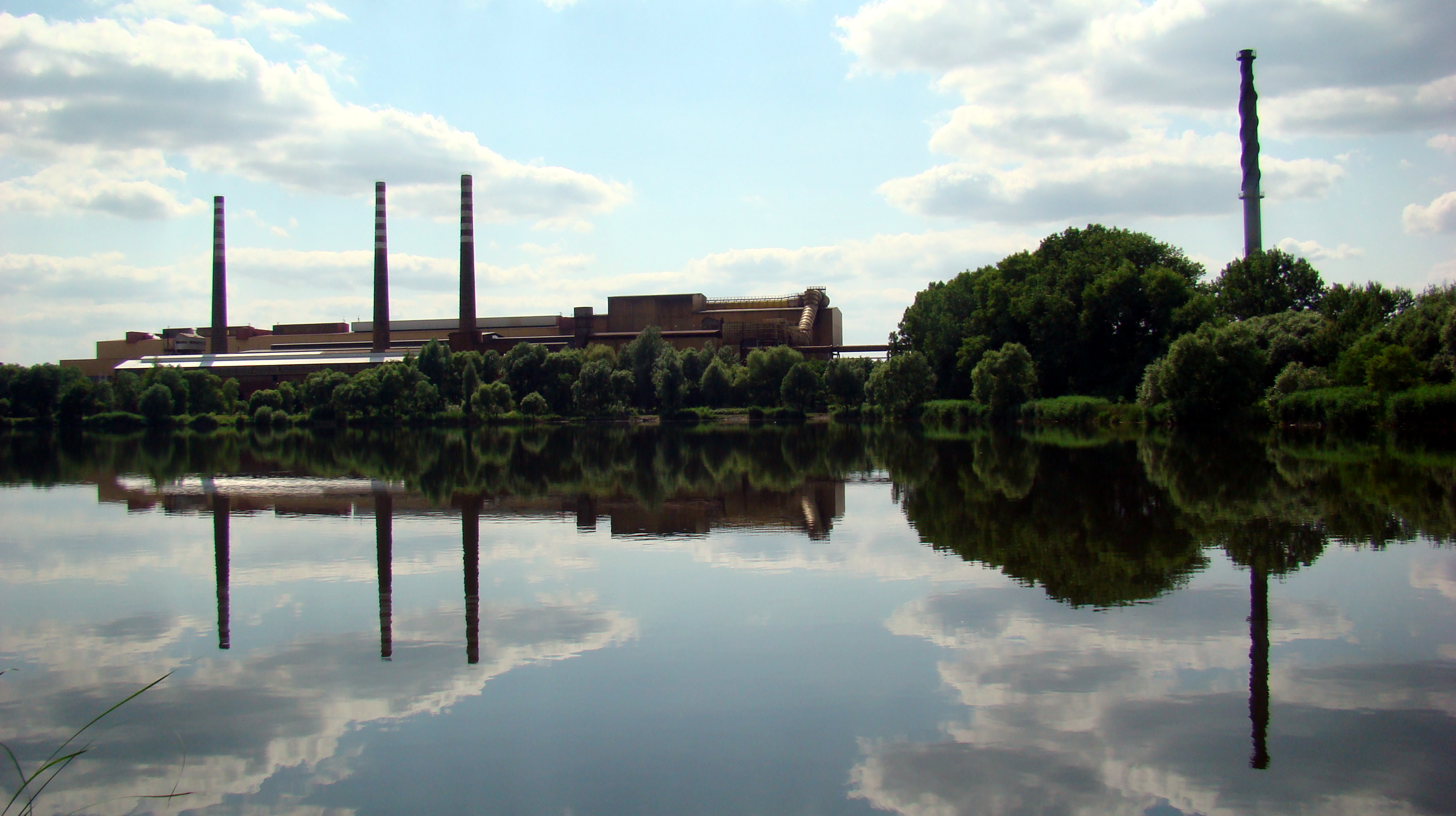
Huta Częstochowa steelworks

There are about 26,000 companies registered in Częstochowa. They are represented by the Regional Chamber of Commerce and Industry in Częstochowa. The investment areas form part of the Katowice Special Economic Zone. The main initiator of activities pertaining to the economic development and investments is the Agency of Regional Development. In 2007, in areas surrounding the ISD Częstochowa Steelworks, the Częstochowa Industry Park was established. In 2011, three industry clusters were established – The Cluster of Polymers Manufacturing "Plastosfera", Częstochowa Communal Cluster "Aglomeracja" and the Regional Cluster of Building Industry and Infrastructure "Budosfera".

=== Industry ===
Częstochowa is the main city in the Częstochowa Industrial District, which is the third biggest in the Silesian Voivodship. Since the medieval times, the metal industry has been developing, thanks to the iron ore deposits. The main factories in the city include:

- The ISD Częstochowa Steelworks – one of the biggest steelworks in Poland, initially established in 1896. The Steelworks produces over 65% of steel sheets manufactured in Poland and has an approximate 35% share in the entire national consumption of this product.
- TRW Automotive Częstochowa – a manufacturer of car safety systems.
- CSF Poland – producer of wires, anti-vibration systems and gaskets
- Brembo Poland – manufacturer of elements of braking systems
- CGR Poland – manufacturer of automotive components
- The Częstochowa Cokery Plant – one of the leading coke producers in Poland
- Guardian Industries Poland – glassworks
- Stolzle Częstochowa – the glassworks specialising in packaging glass for luxury products and perfumes.
- Iron Cast Foundry "Volcano" – the oldest operating factory in the city, established in 1894
- Dospel – producer of ventilation systems
- Metalplast – producer of locks and construction hardware fittings
- ViperPrint – one of the biggest printing houses in Poland

== Tourism ==
Currently, the city is one of the main tourist attractions of the area and is sometimes called the little Nuremberg because of the number of souvenir shops. It attracts millions (4.5 mln – 2005) of tourists and pilgrims every year. The Black Madonna of Częstochowa, housed at the Jasna Góra Monastery, is a particularly popular attraction.

Throughout the centuries, many buildings have been erected, most of them now have the status of tourist attractions and historical monuments since Częstochowa was established already in the Middle Ages. Among those attractions are old townhouses and the urban core of the city centre. The most popular with religious tourism as mentioned above is the Jasna Góra Monastery.

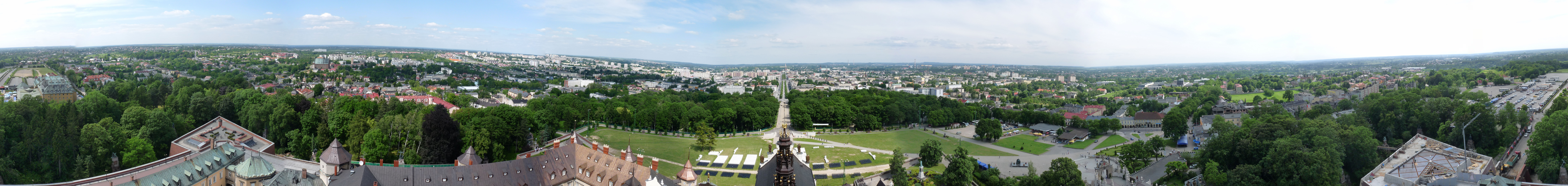
Panorama of Częstochowa

=== Architectural sites ===
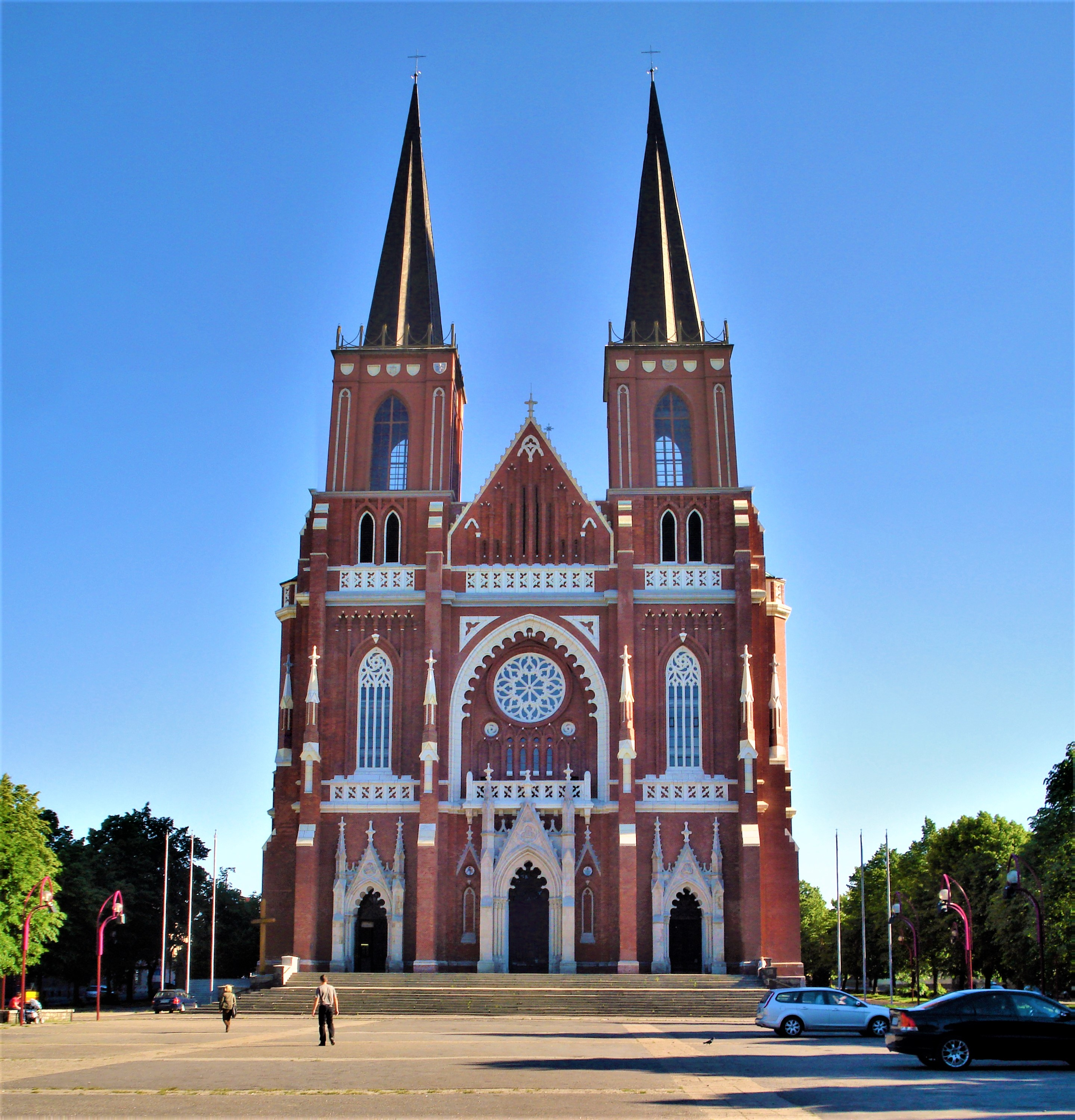
Cathedral Basilica of the Holy Family

The main representative artery in the city centre is the Najświętszej Maryi Panny Avenue (The Holy Virgin Mary Avenue). It was first built in the beginning of the 19th century, as a road linking Częstochowa with New Częstochowa, cities which were administratively merged in 1826. The most characteristic feature of the avenue is its layout, whereby the lanes are separated by the pedestrianised boulevard. During the pilgrimage period, the Avenues are used by pilgrims heading for Jasna Góra Monastery. The avenues are 1.5 km (1 mi) long and 44 m wide; primarily they perform trade, service, financial and cultural functions. The housing consists mostly of classicist, late-classicist houses, rarely eclectic. More modern buildings can also be noticed. The most interesting townhouses include:

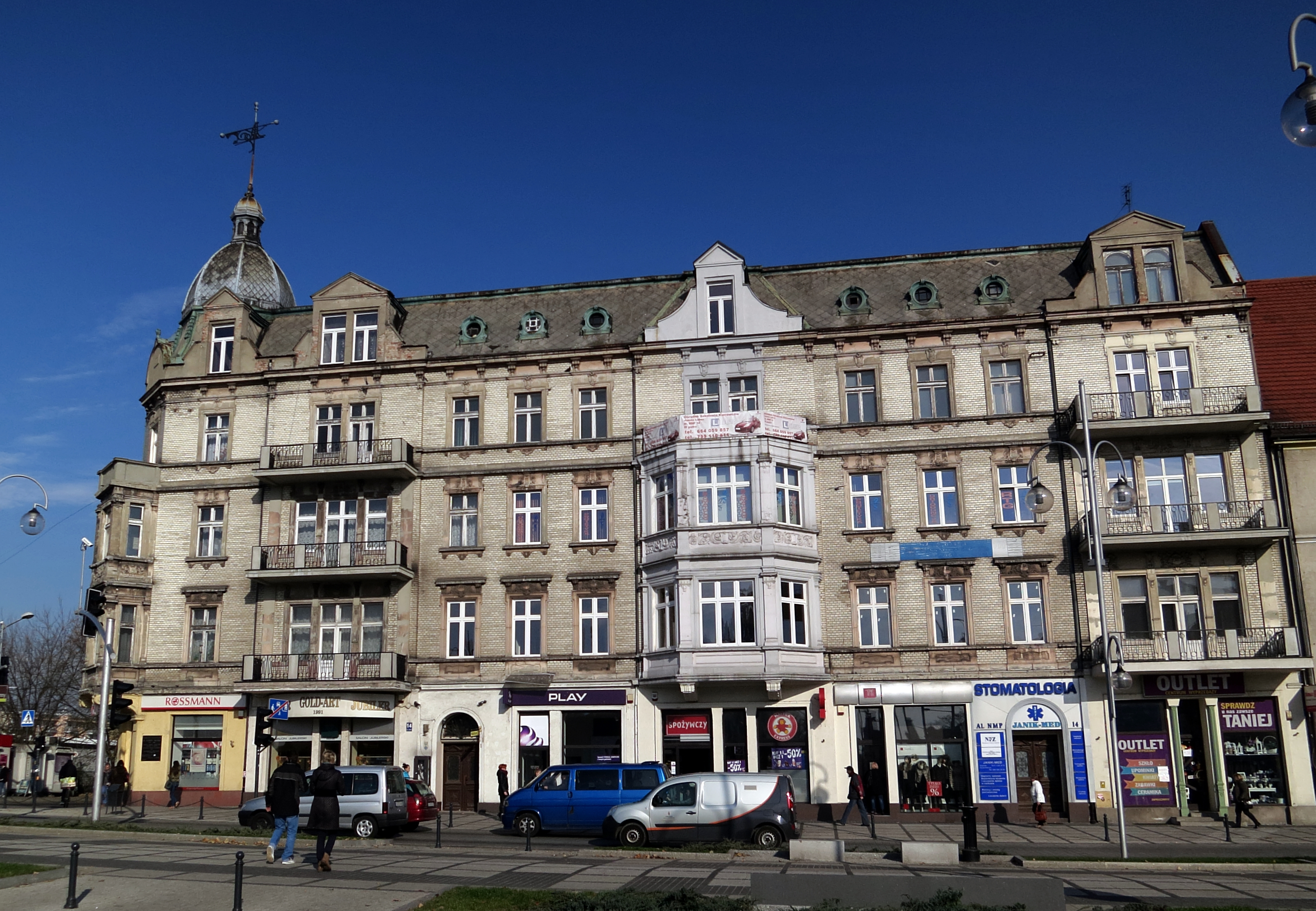
Franke's House

- Franke's House – in the beginning, it belonged to Adolf Franke, a Lutheran hailing from Greater Poland and also an owner of a spinning mill and textile mill. It was being built between 1901 and 1903. Between 1918 and 1939, Hotel 'Victoria' was located there. During World War II, it lay on the border of the Jewish ghetto, which made it the key point for those wanting to escape. After the dismantling of the ghetto, Franke's House housed a German hospital and army hotel, and after the war, it was the seat of the High School of Arts and a bursary. Eclectic with prevailing neo-renaissance features.

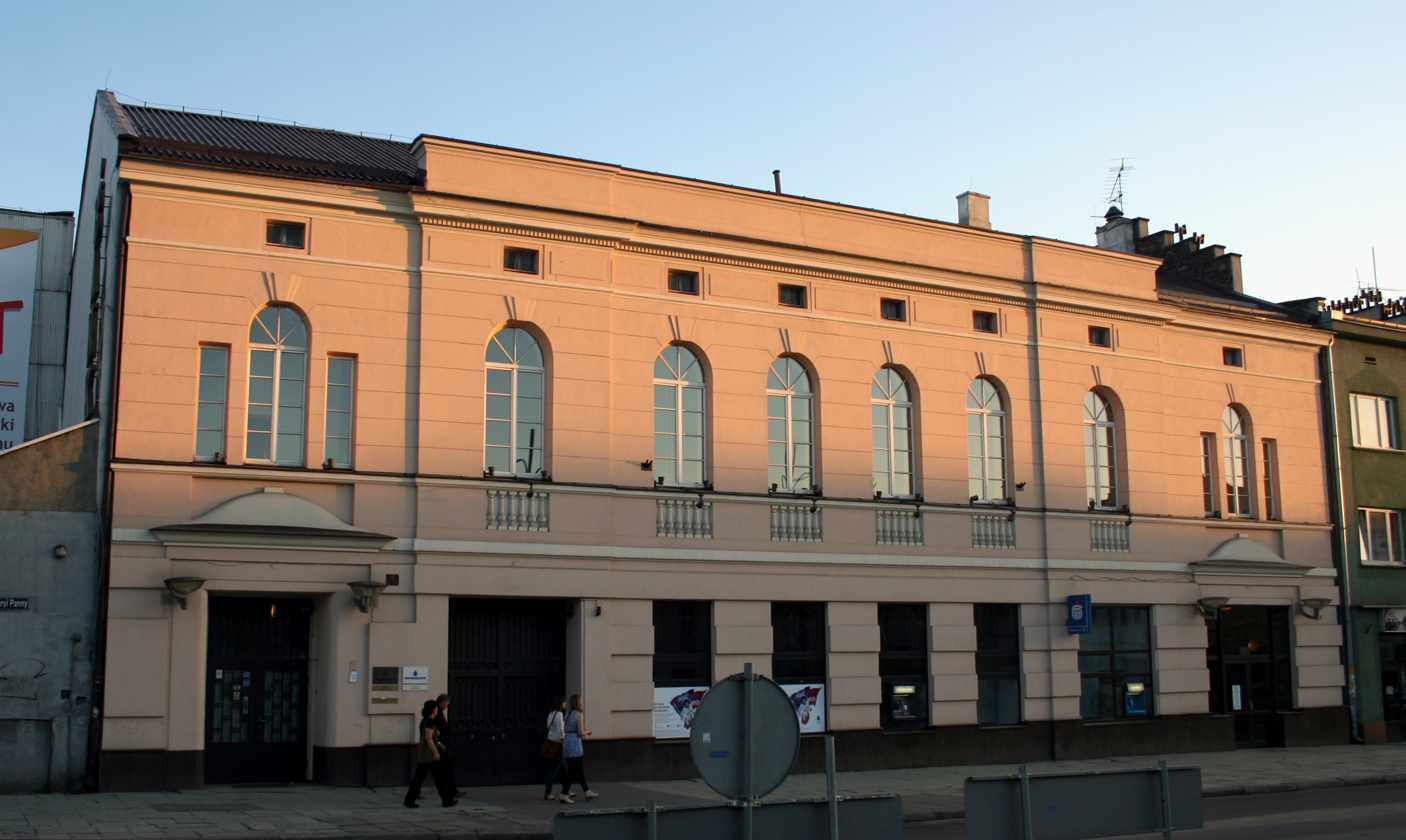
Zapałkiewicz House

- Zapałkiewicz House is a classicist townhouse, built in 1871. It was the seat of a theatre, which was functioning until 1908. Later, until 1923, there was a cinema "Paryskie" and subsequently, a number of financial institution have had their branches in the building.
- Mercantile Townhouse – eclectic townhouse, was being built between 1894 and 1907. At the beginning business and economics courses were taking place there. Before the World War 2, it was the seat of Warsaw Industrial Bank and Częstochowa Savings and Loans Bank.
- Kohn's House is a neo-classicist townhouse, built in 1865. Before the war, a number of enterprises were operating in the building, including Bankers, Jackowski's Restaurant and Cafe, and Bata's Shoe Shop and between 1909 and 1930 a cinema called "Odeon".

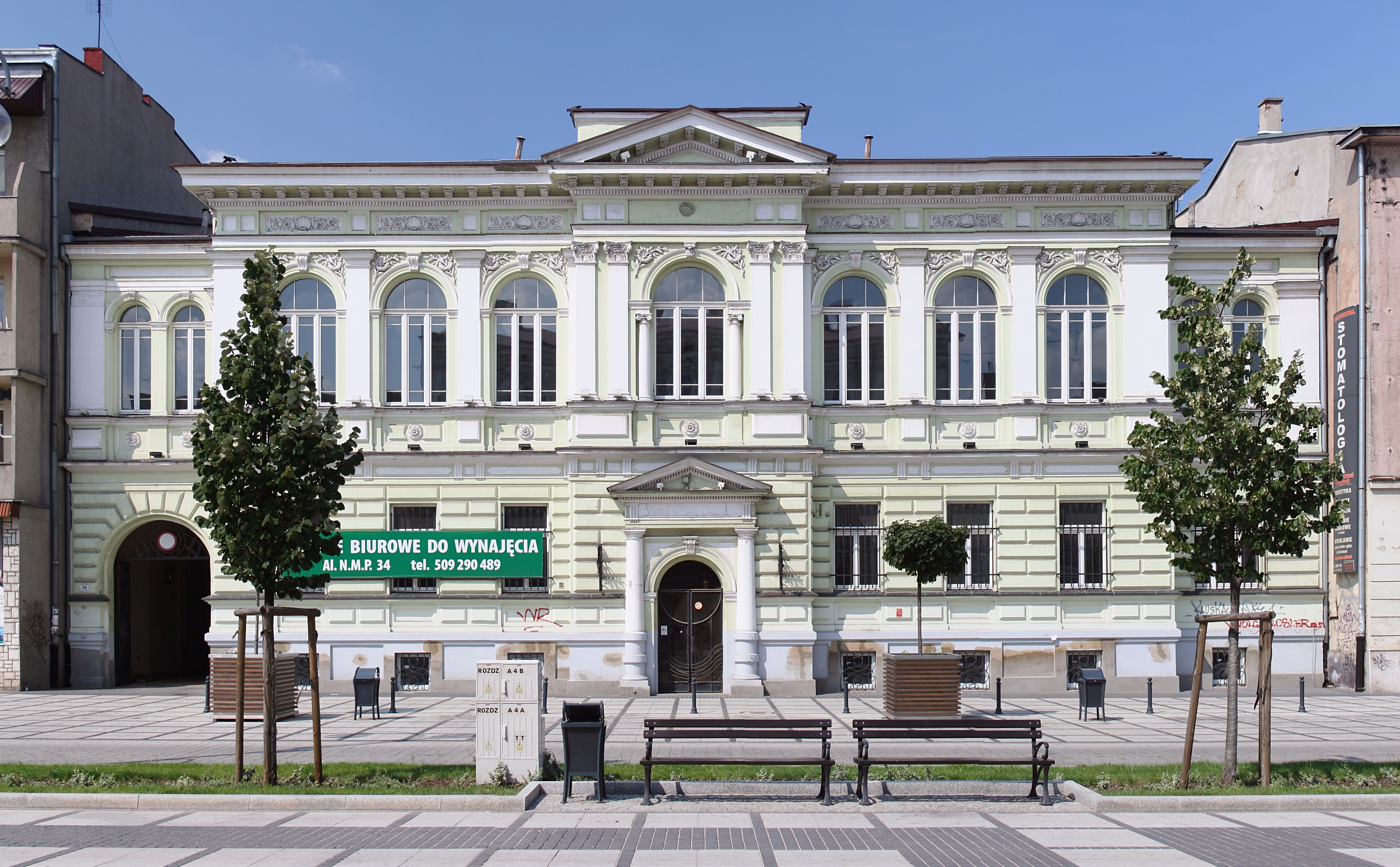
Polish Bank's Townhouse

- Polish Bank's Townhouse is an Art Nouveau townhouse, built in 1904. In the beginning, it was the seat of a local branch of the Russian State Bank. In 1927, the building was taken over by Bank Polski SA. After World War II, it became the property of the National Bank of Poland. In 1990, the building was sold to the ING Silesian Bank.
- Biegański's House is a one-storey classicist townhouse built in 1880. Initially, it was owned by Karol Henryk Rosenfeld and later by his son-in-law dr. Władysław Biegański. After the Second World War, the building was a seat of the Częstochowa's Doctors Association.
- Hantke's Palace is an example of Baroque Revival architecture, built to the order of an industrialist and entrepreneur Bernard Hantke, who established the ISD Częstochowa Steel Mill. The palace was built between 1900 and 1903. After WW2, the building was the seat of the Częstochowa Steel Mill Culture Centre.
- Former Orthodox Vicarage – classicist townhouse, built in 1875, until 1918 it was the seat of a local Orthodox priest. In 1918, it was taken over by the local Catholic diocese. After the war, there was a local headquarters of the Polish Army. Since the 1970s it has been a property of the Częstochowa Regional Museum.
- Old Square – a square located in the Old Town district with dimensions of 100m by 66m. Since medieval times it operated as the main square of Old Częstochowa. There are still preserved old townhouses, which are listed on the historic monuments register. Between the 15th century and 1812, a town hall was located there, which was then damaged because of a fire. In 2007, archaeological works began. As a result, a city well was found and also fundaments of city facilities such as a weigh house and gallows.
- Wieluńska Street – one of the historic streets in Częstochowa, located in the vicinity of Jasna Góra monastery. It is 300 meters long and the buildings on the street were erected in the late-classicist style in the second half of the 19th century.

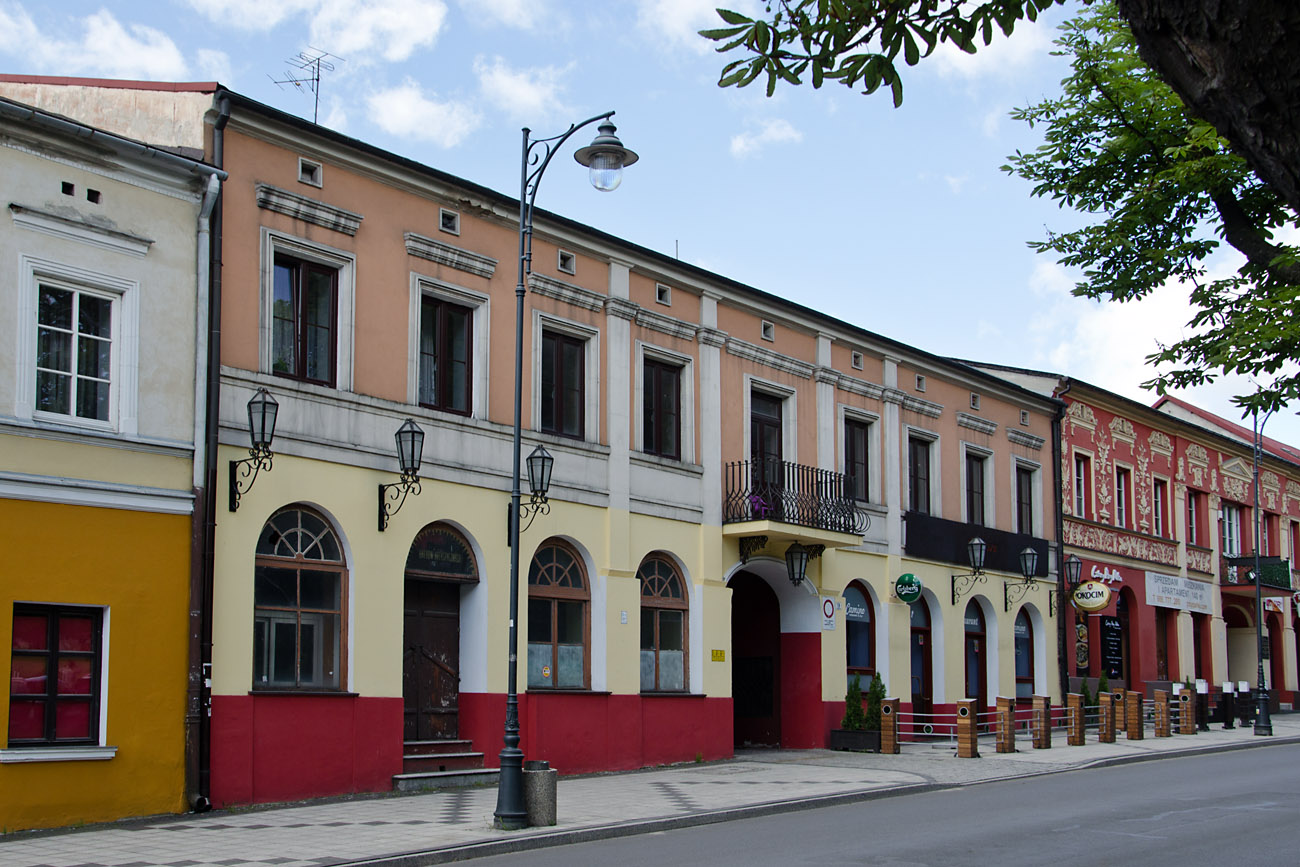
Old houses at Ulica 7 Kamienic

- Ulica 7 Kamienic (7 Townhouses Street) is one of the historical streets in Częstochowa. It is 600 metres long; the street was created in the first half of the 19th century. The name derives from the seven houses which had been built at the beginning.
- Cathedral Basilica of the Holy Family, Częstochowa – a cathedral built in the neo-gothic style between 1901 and 1927. In 1925, it became a cathedral of a Roman Catholic Diocese of Częstochowa and in 1992 it became the basilica of the Roman Catholic Archdiocese of Częstochowa.
- St James' Church – built between 1869 and 1872 under the initiative of a Tsar's representative for Częstochowa region – Parmen Kashernikov. Initially, it was a seat of an Orthodox parish of Saints Cyril and Methodius. In 1914, it became a property of a Catholic church, serving as an army parish church. After the end of First World War, it was retained by the Catholic church as part of the Recovery of Orthodox Churches in the Second Polish Republic. In 1937, the Archdiocese of Częstochowa established a parish of St James.
- St Sigismund's Church – a gothic church built in the 15th century, making it the oldest parish church in Częstochowa.
- St Barbara's Church – built in the 16th century under the initiative of Father Andrzej Gołdonowski from the Pauline Order. The place is linked to the icon of the Black Madonna of Częstochowa. Following the desecration of the icon by robbers in 1430 who left it at a spring next to the current location of the church.

=== Parks ===
Jasna Góra Parks are two city parks (Stanisław Staszic Park and 3 May Park) located in the city centre, on the slope of Jasna Góra Hill. The parks were established in 1843. The total area of both parks is 11.8 ha. The parks are a popular leisure place and a spot for those enjoying short walks. In 1909, the Great Exhibition of Agriculture and Industry took place in the park, it was attended by 660 exhibitors and 500,000 visitors. In Staszic Park, one can find an astronomical observatory, which was opened in 1909. The parks also accommodate the Iron Ore Museum.

There are also several other parks in various parts of the city, including Park Lisiniec, Las Aniołowski, Park Parkitka.

Avenues and parks

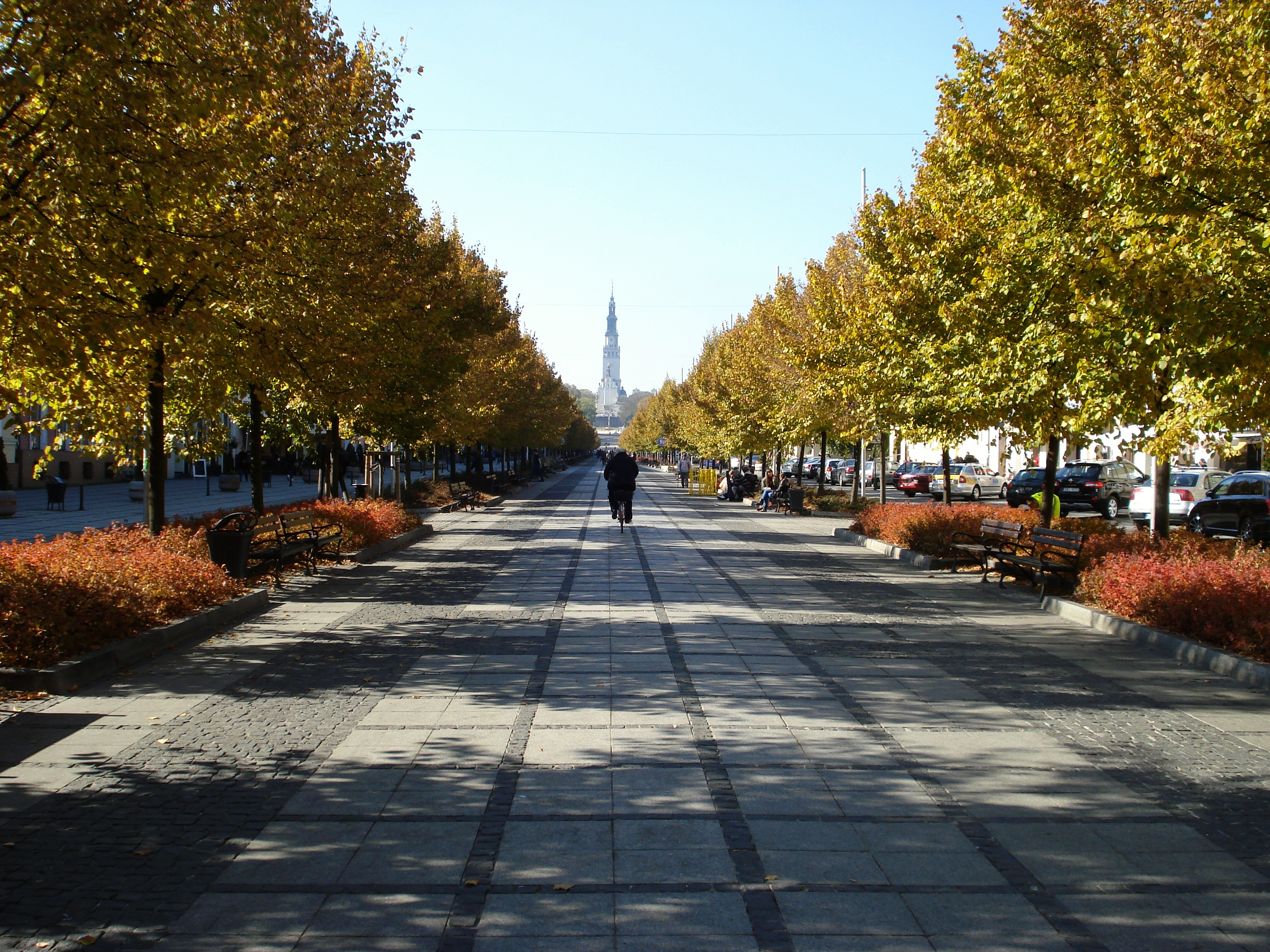
Maryi Panny Avenue

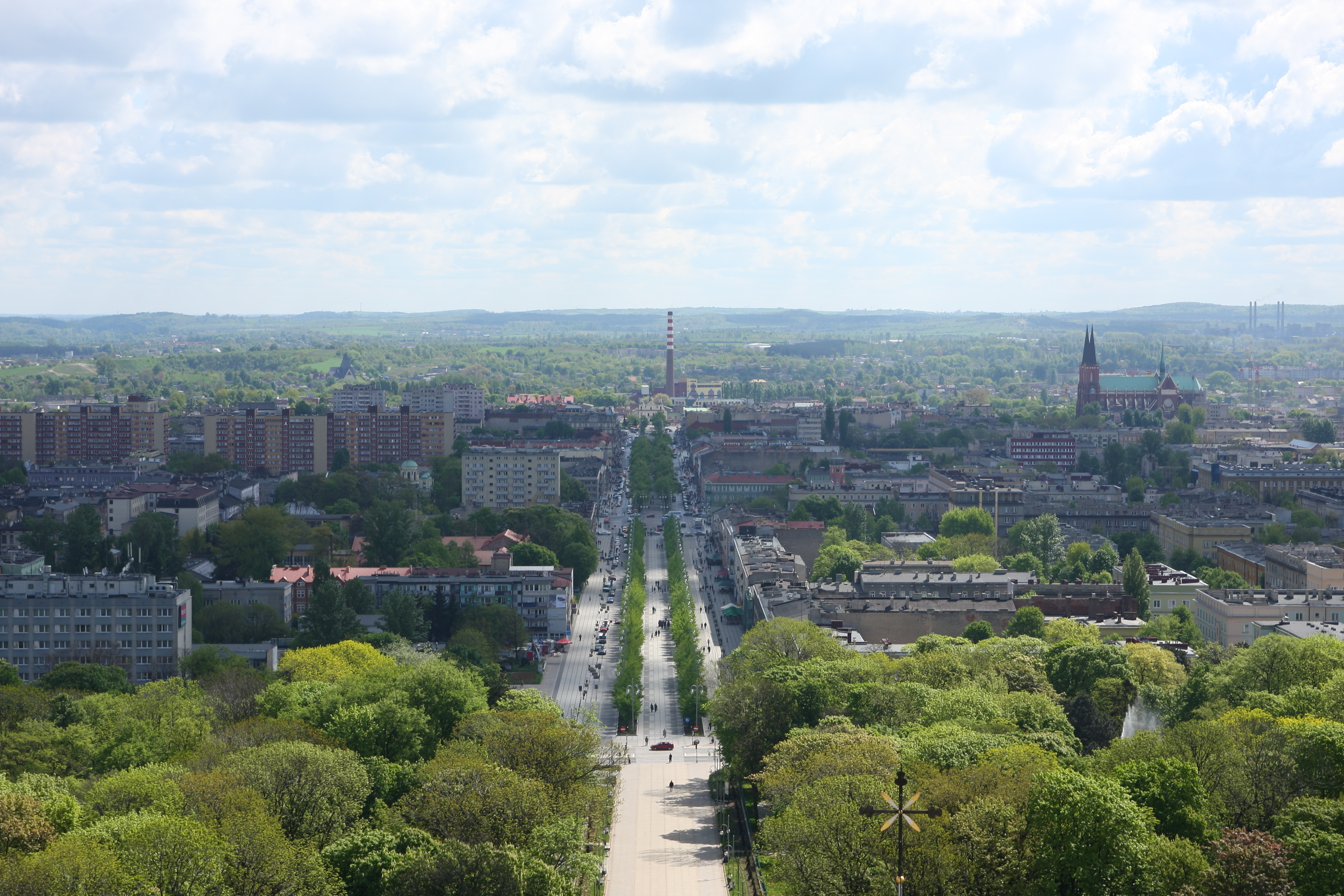
View on the Avenues

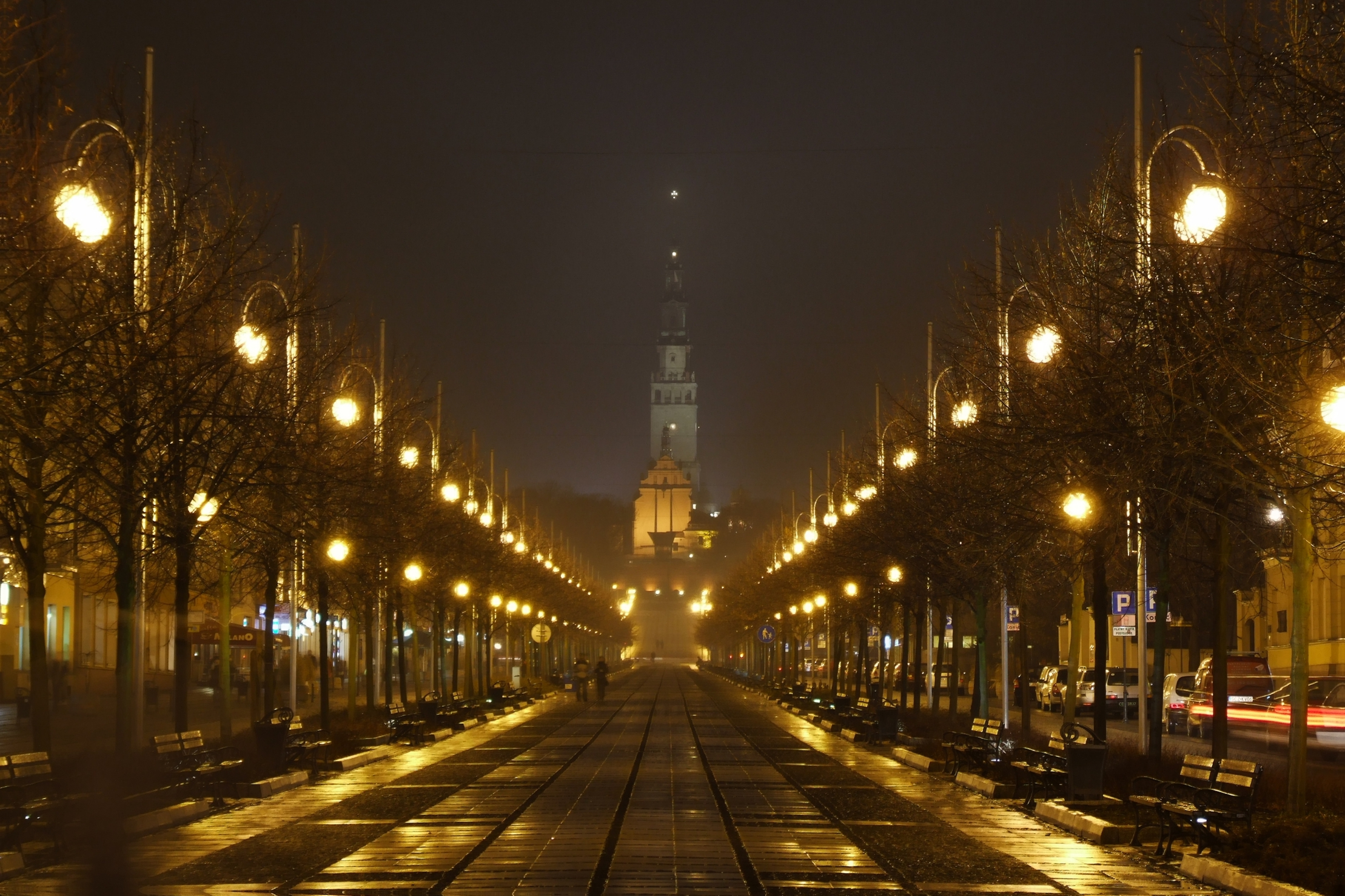
3rd Avenue during the night

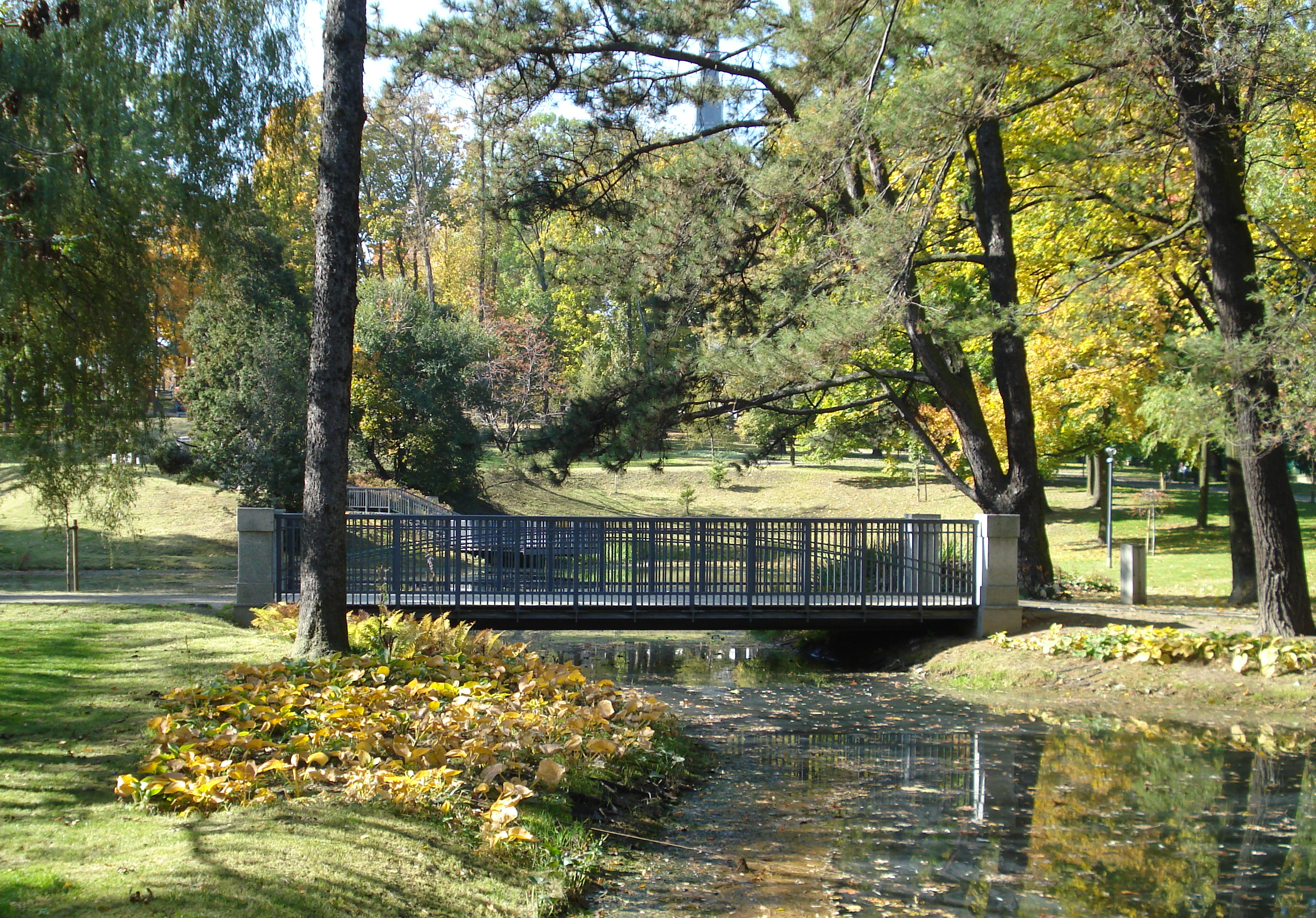
Staszic Park

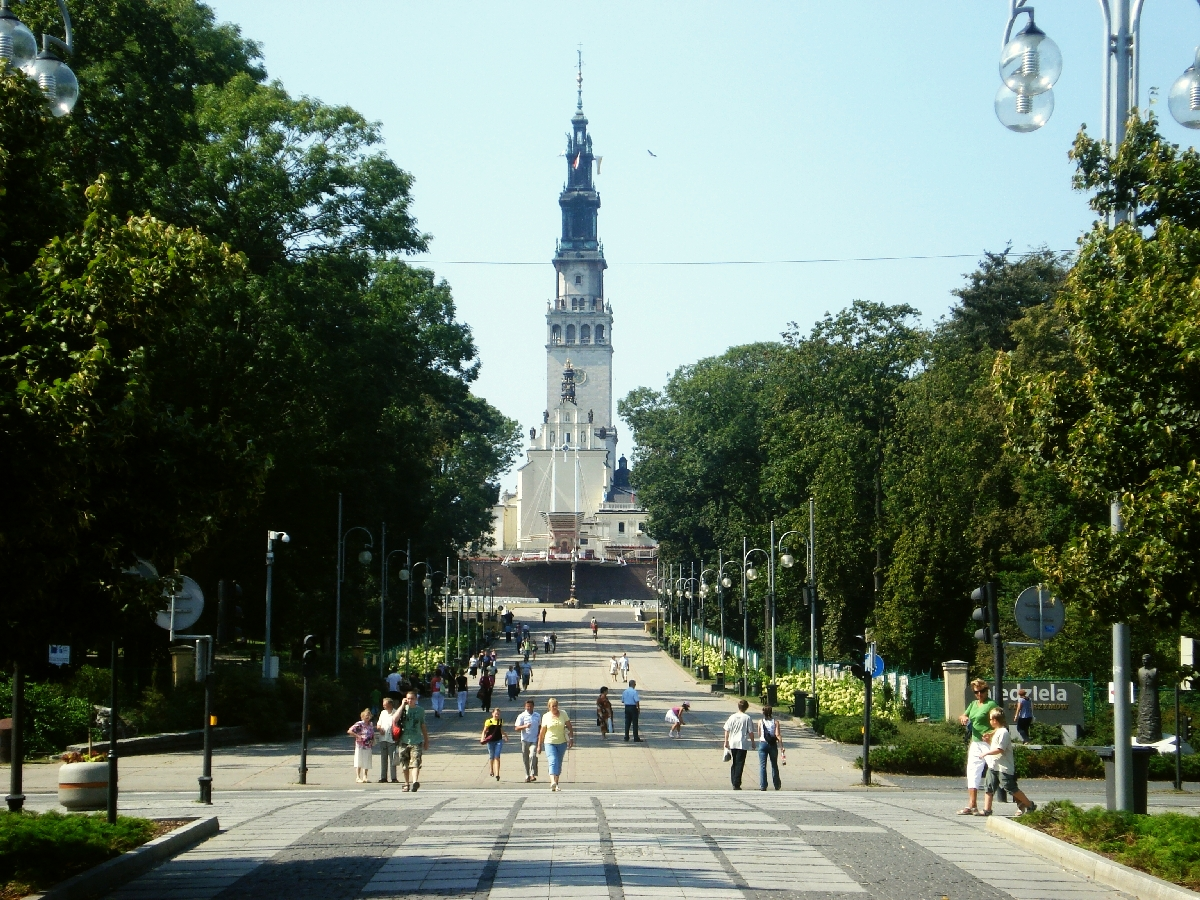
Sienkiewicz Avenue

== Transport ==
Main road connections from Częstochowa include a connection with Warsaw (to the north-east) and Katowice (to the south) via the European route E75 (Motorway). There are also three other national roads: to Wieluń, to Opole and to Piotrków Trybunalski. Furthermore, Częstochowa is a major railroad hub, located at the intersection of two important lines—west–east (from Lubliniec to Kielce) and north–south (from Warsaw to Katowice). Also, an additional northbound line stems from Częstochowa, which goes to Chorzew Siemkowice, where it joins the Polish Coal Trunk-Line. There are six railway stations in the city, the biggest ones being Częstochowa Osobowa and Częstochowa Stradom. The city has direct connections to many Polish cities as Warsaw, Kraków, Katowice, Wrocław and Szczecin, proteza koniecpolska makes some of the connections more comfortable.

The public transport is managed by the Częstochowa City Council of Roads and Transport. The public transport carriage is contracted to the City Public Transport Corporation (Miejskie Przedsiębiorstwo Komunikacyjne). The public transport in Częstochowa comprises 3 tram lines, 28 city bus lines and 4 suburban lines connecting Częstochowa with Poczesna, Olsztyn, Zawodzie and Nierada. The bus transport connecting Częstochowa with other towns and villages in the Częstochowa region is operated by the Częstochowa Bus Transport Ltd. (PKS Częstochowa) as well as other private operators

The closest airport is the Katowice International Airport, which is located 60 km (37 mi) from Częstochowa, and a small Częstochowa - Rudniki airport in Kościelec, Rędziny.

Transport

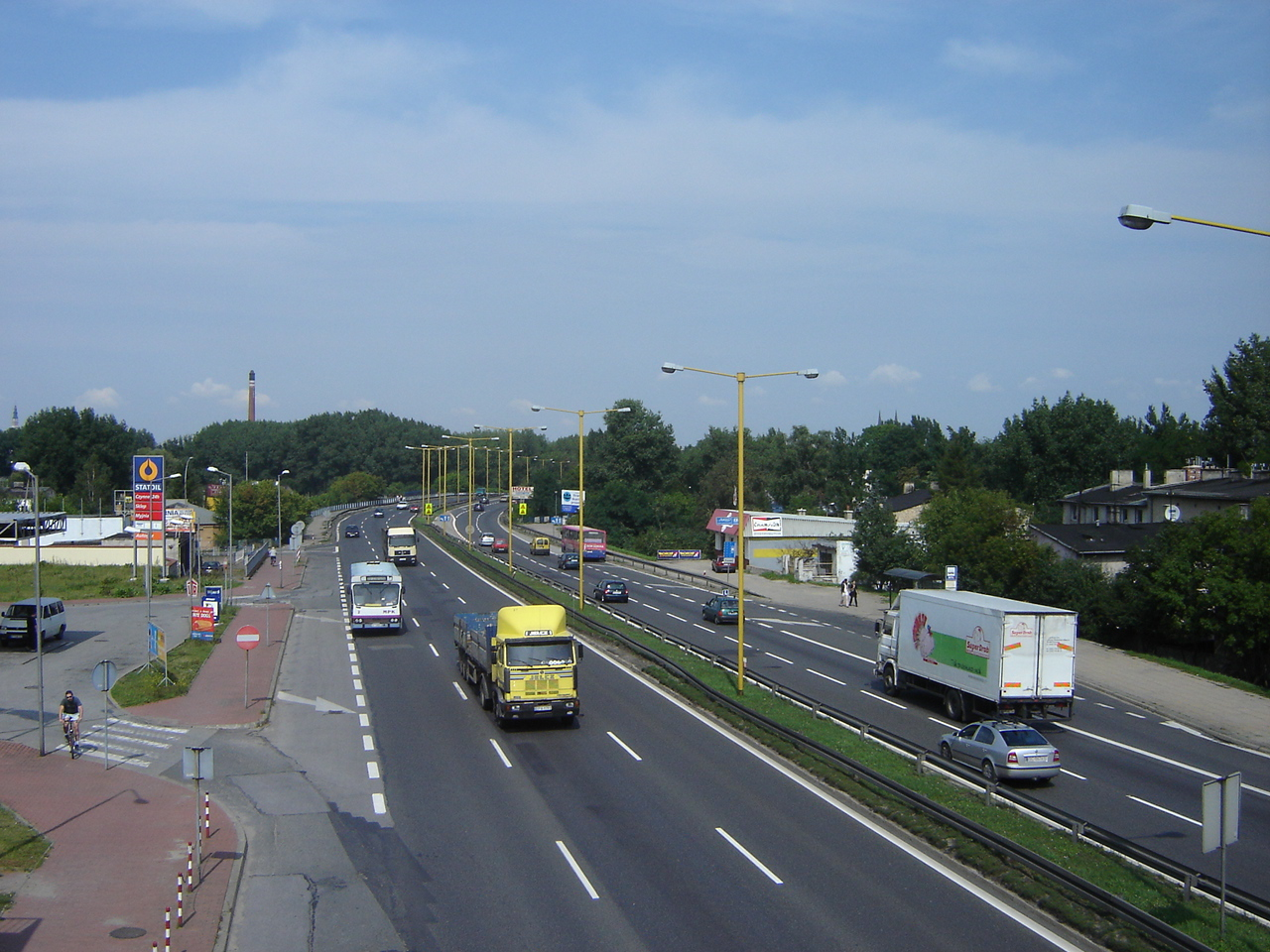
National Road DK 1 in Częstochowa

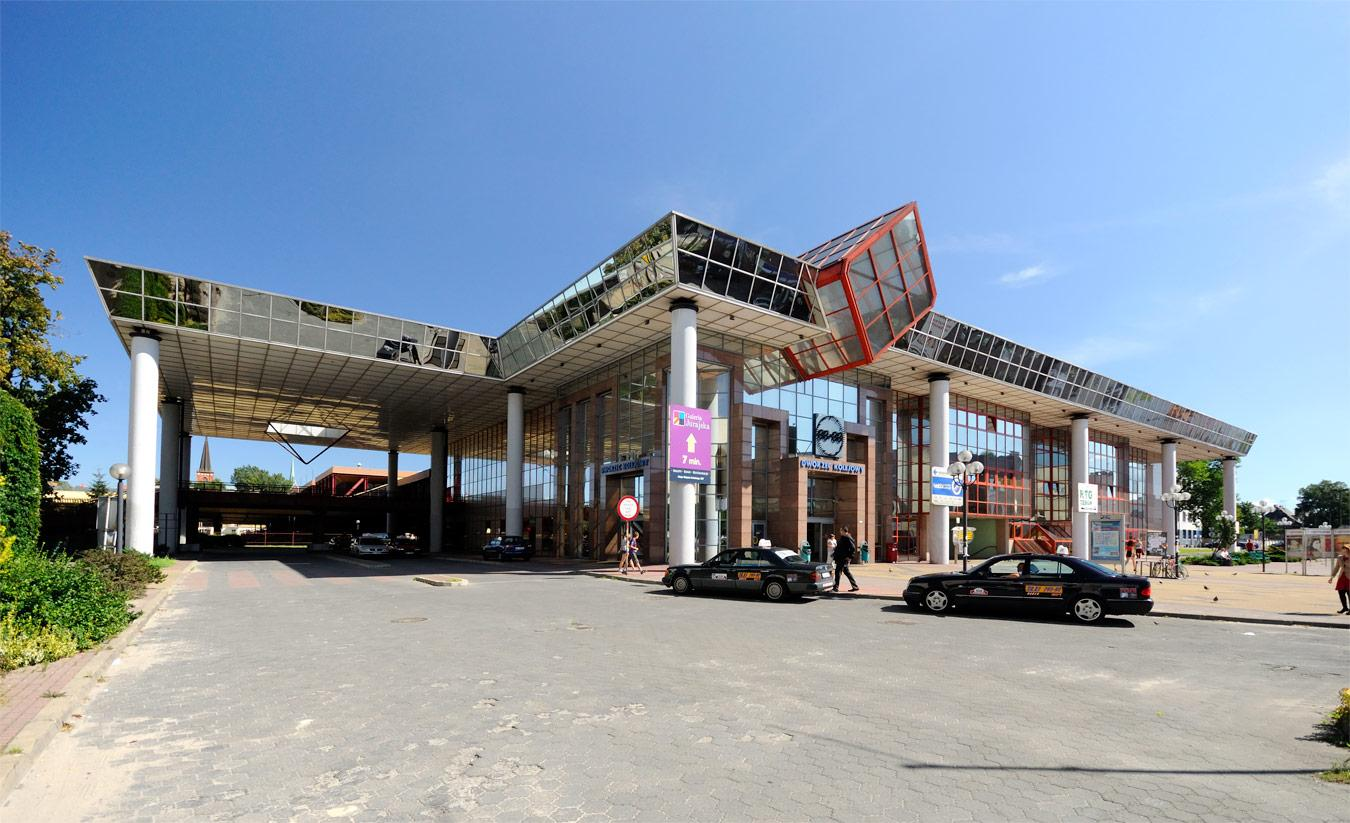
Częstochowa, Częstochowa Osobowa (Główna) Railway Station

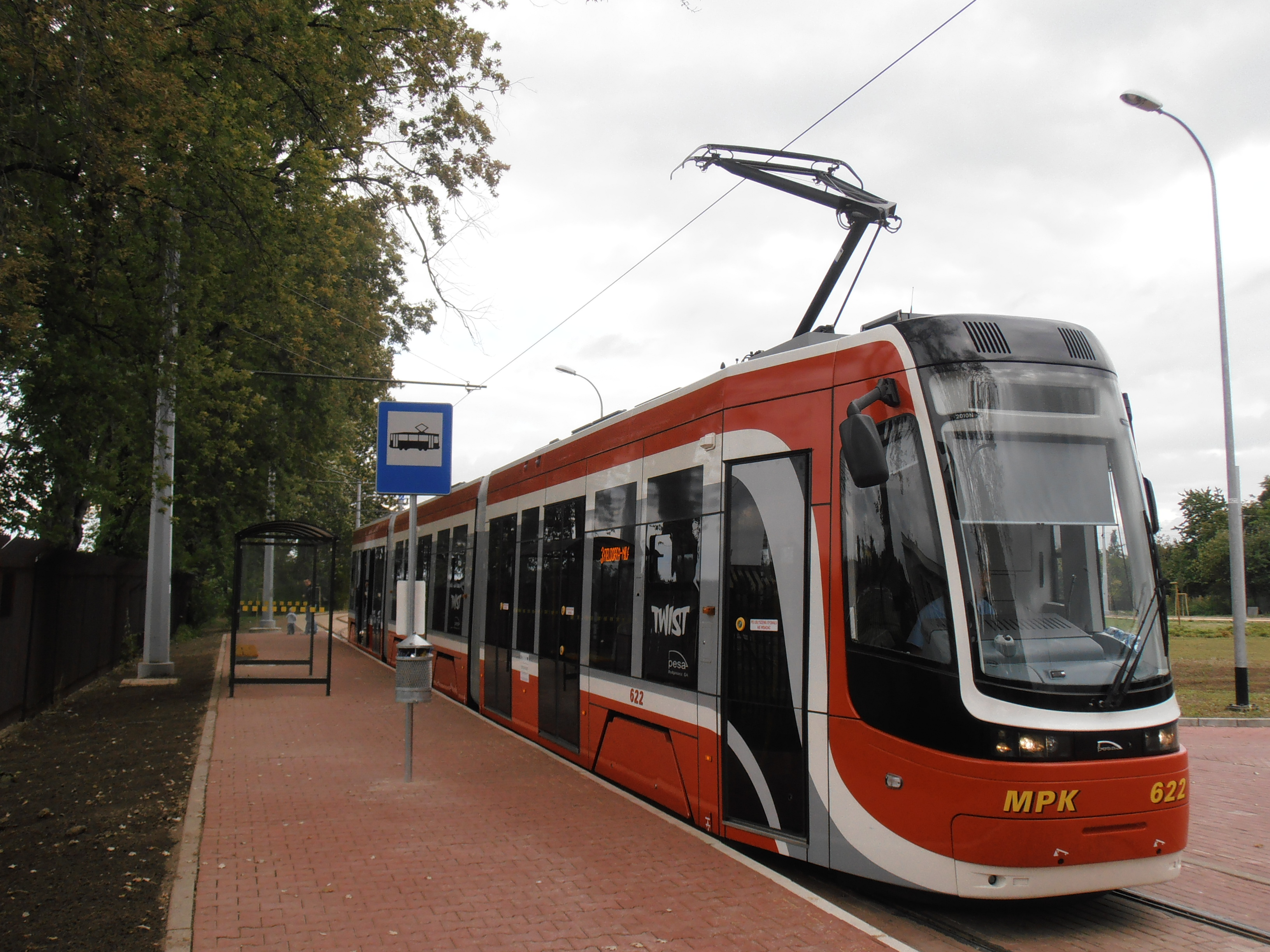
2012 Twist tram in Częstochowa

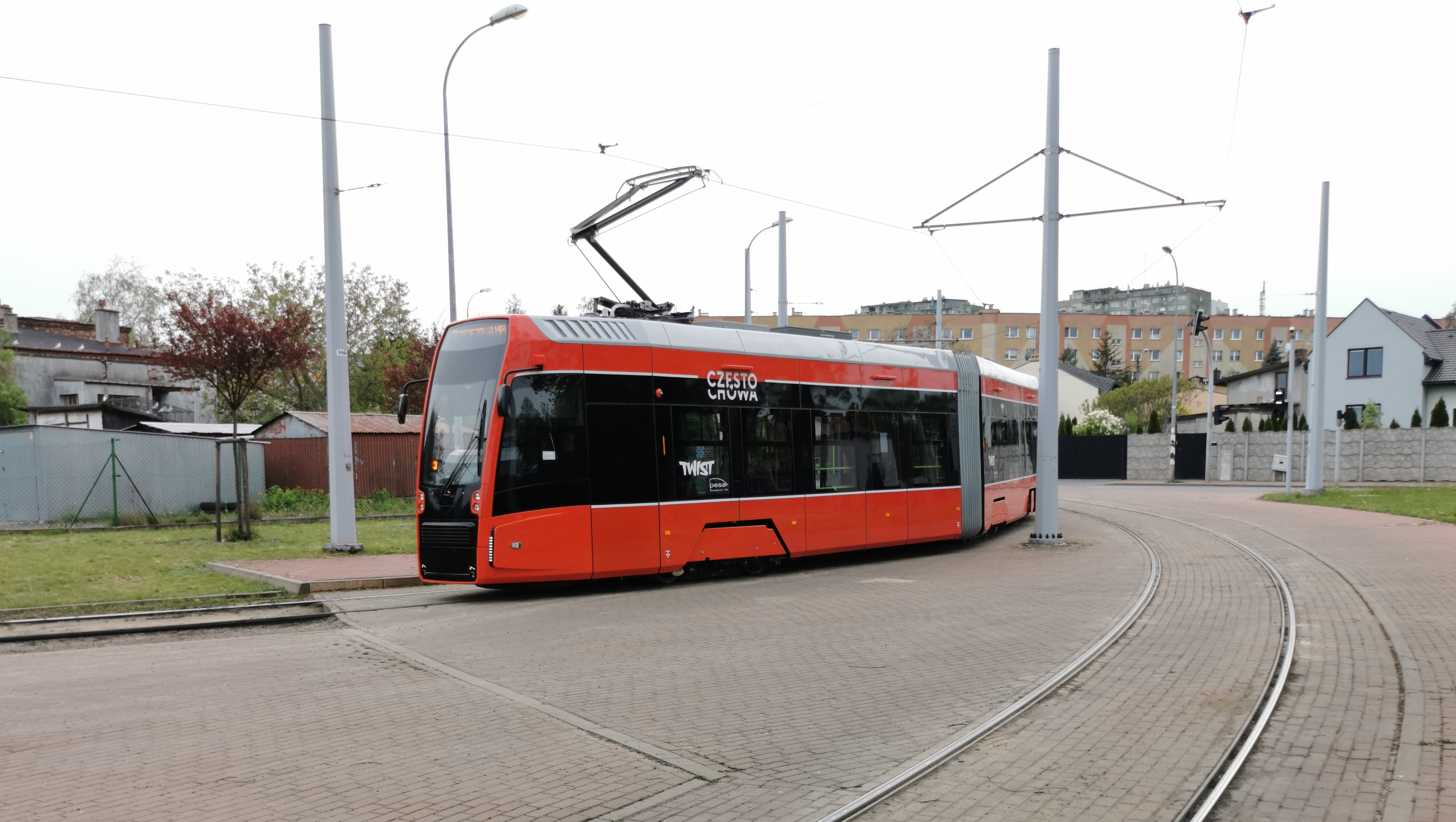
2020 Pesa Twist at the Stadion Raków loop

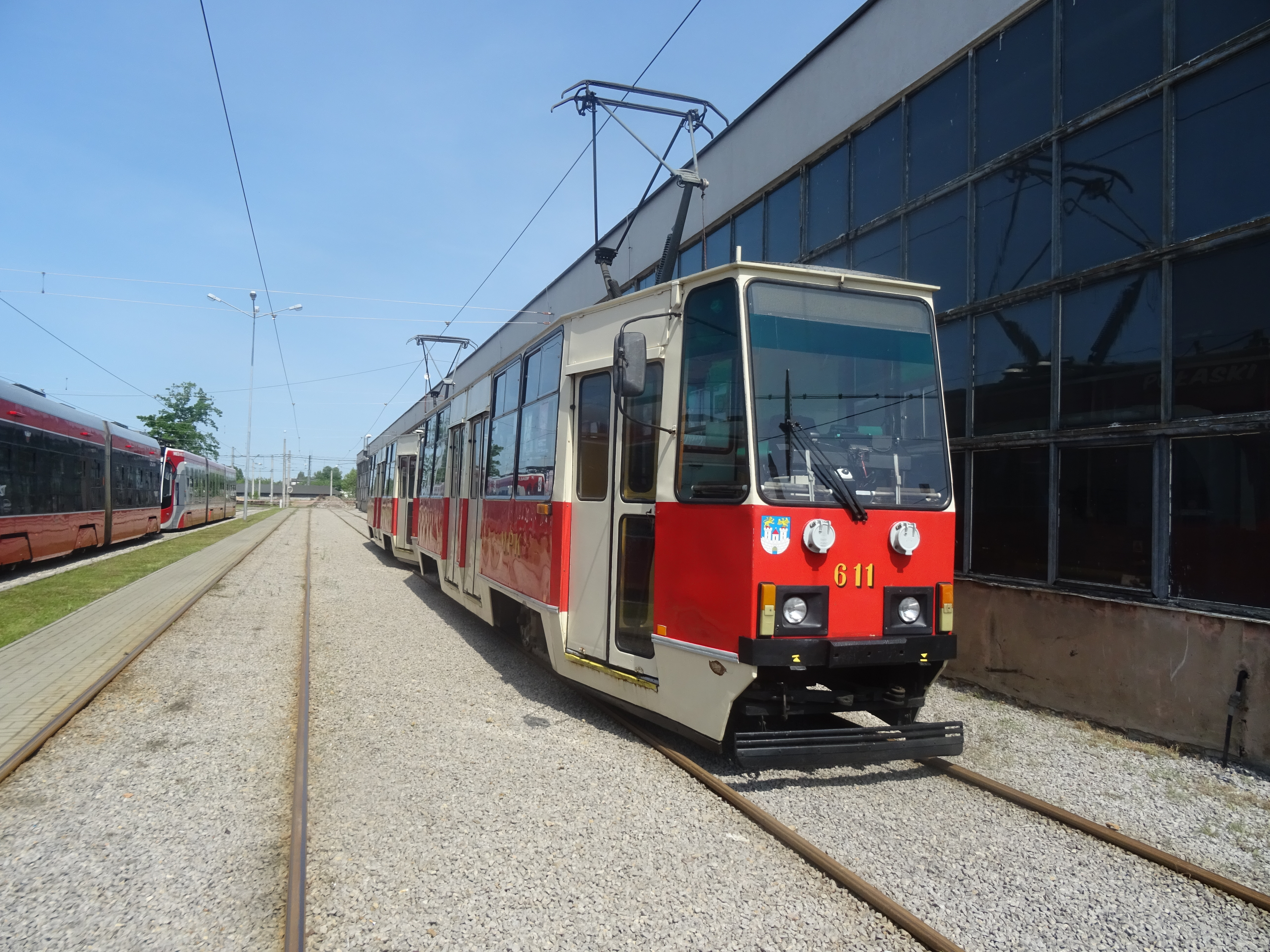
Konstal 105Na tram parked at the depot

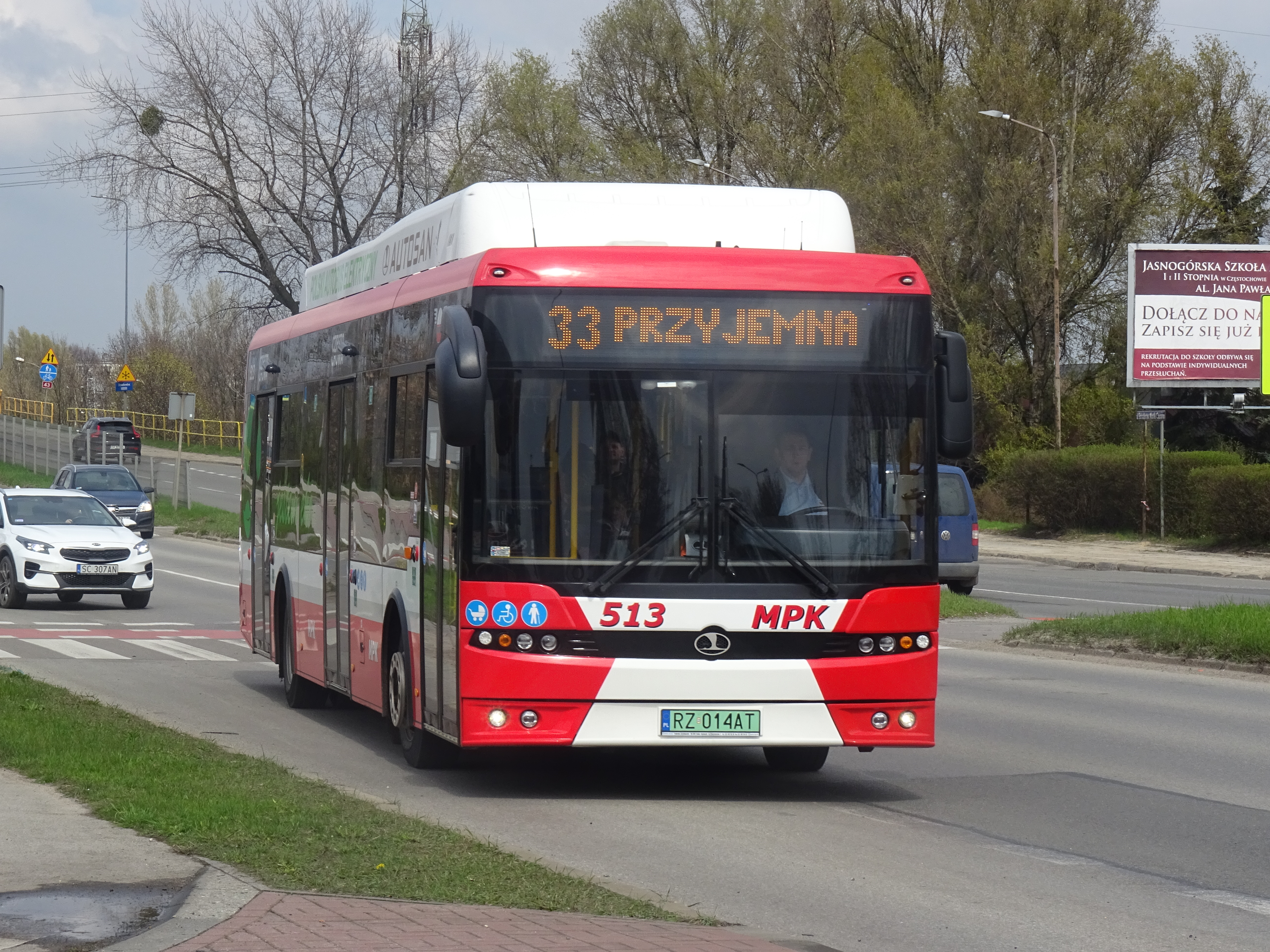
Autosan Sancity 12LFE bus on line 33 in Częstochowa

== Culture ==
=== Museums ===
In Częstochowa on top of the Jasna Góra Monastery serving the museum and exhibition functions, other similar institutions include:

- Częstochowa Regional Museum, the oldest museum in Częstochowa. The seat of the museum is in the building of a former town hall. The Częstochowa Regional Museum consists of a number of venues in Częstochowa and its surroundings.
- Town Hall, the most presentable Museum building in Częstochowa. It was built in 1828, because of administrative needs arising from the expansion and merger of two towns: Old Częstochowa and New Częstochowa. It has been the seat of Częstochowa Regional Museum since 1967. There is a permanent historical exhibition, History of the City of Częstochowa – Stage 1. It illustrates the development of the city, from its beginnings to the 17th century. The 'Gallery of Prominent Citizens of Częstochowa' reminds about individuals important to the local community. In the gallery 'Attic', occasional temporary exhibitions are presented.
- House of Poetry – Halina Poświatowska Museum, located on Jasnogórska Street 23. After World War 2, Halina Poświatowska and her family lived there. It has been opened since 2006. As a part of the permanent exhibition, the visitors can see documents, memorabilia, photographs and scripts of her poems. Sometimes, in the museum poetry evenings are organised.
- Gallery of 19th and 20th Century Sculpture and Painting, located on Katedralna Street inside a two-storey terrace house from the beginning of the 20th century. There are three exhibitions: Art of Young Poland, Polish Avant-garde and Modern Art, Częstochowa's Art of the 19th century and first half of the 20th century.
- Archaeological Reserve of Lusatian Culture, located in the Raków neighborhood on Łukasińskiego Street. This 2500-year-old burial ground was discovered in 1955 during construction works of Częstochowa's tram line. It is a permanently maintained burial ground from the early stages of the Iron Age (750–550 years BC). Tourists have been able to visit the site since 1965. Around the burial ground, there are showcases about the Lusatian culture.
- Museum of Iron Ore Mining, established in 1976 in underground corridors resembling mine corridors. The Museum recreates mine workings and is equipped with mining equipment from the closed down mine "Szczekaczka".
Prominent museums

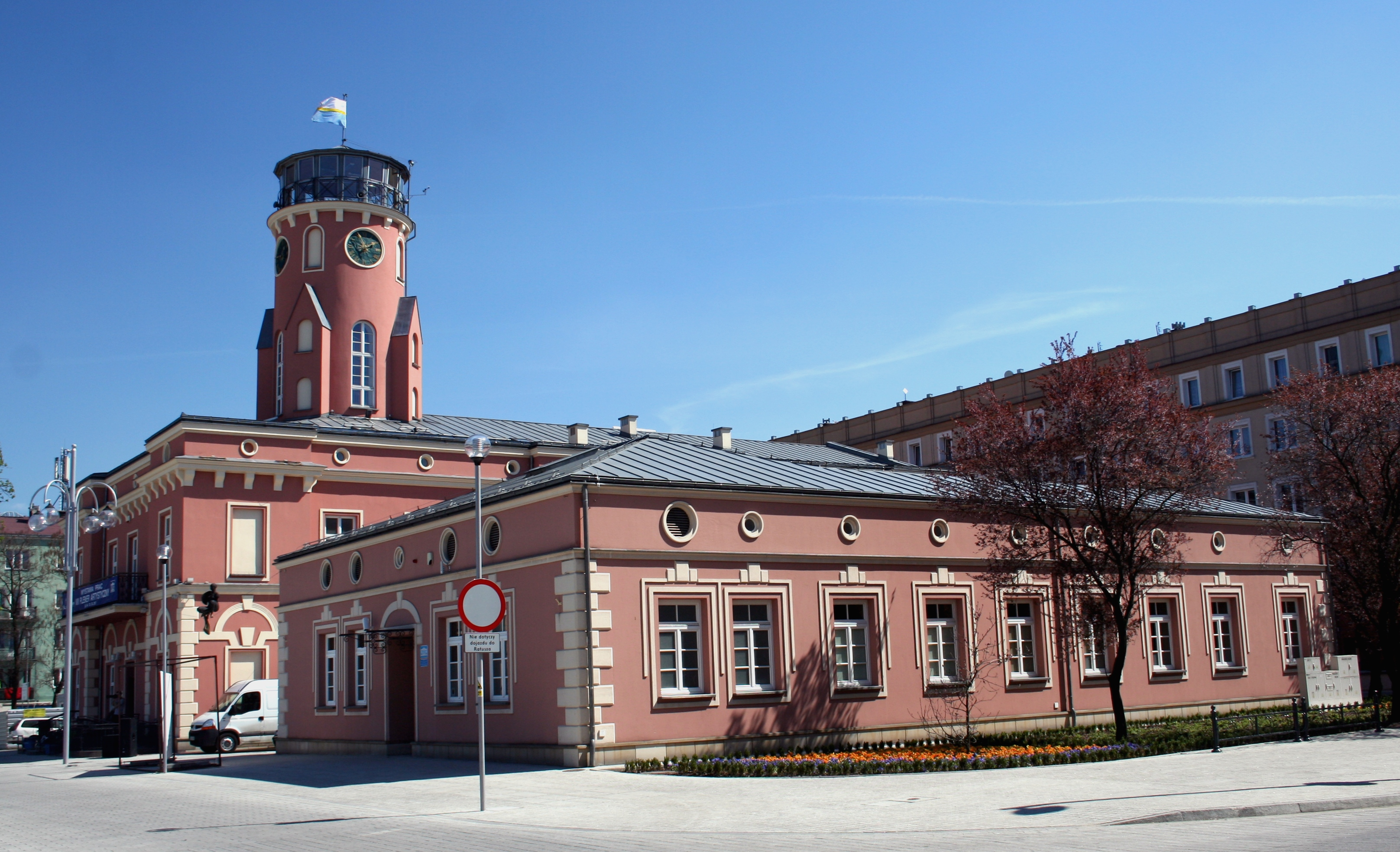
Town Hall and Częstochowa Regional Museum

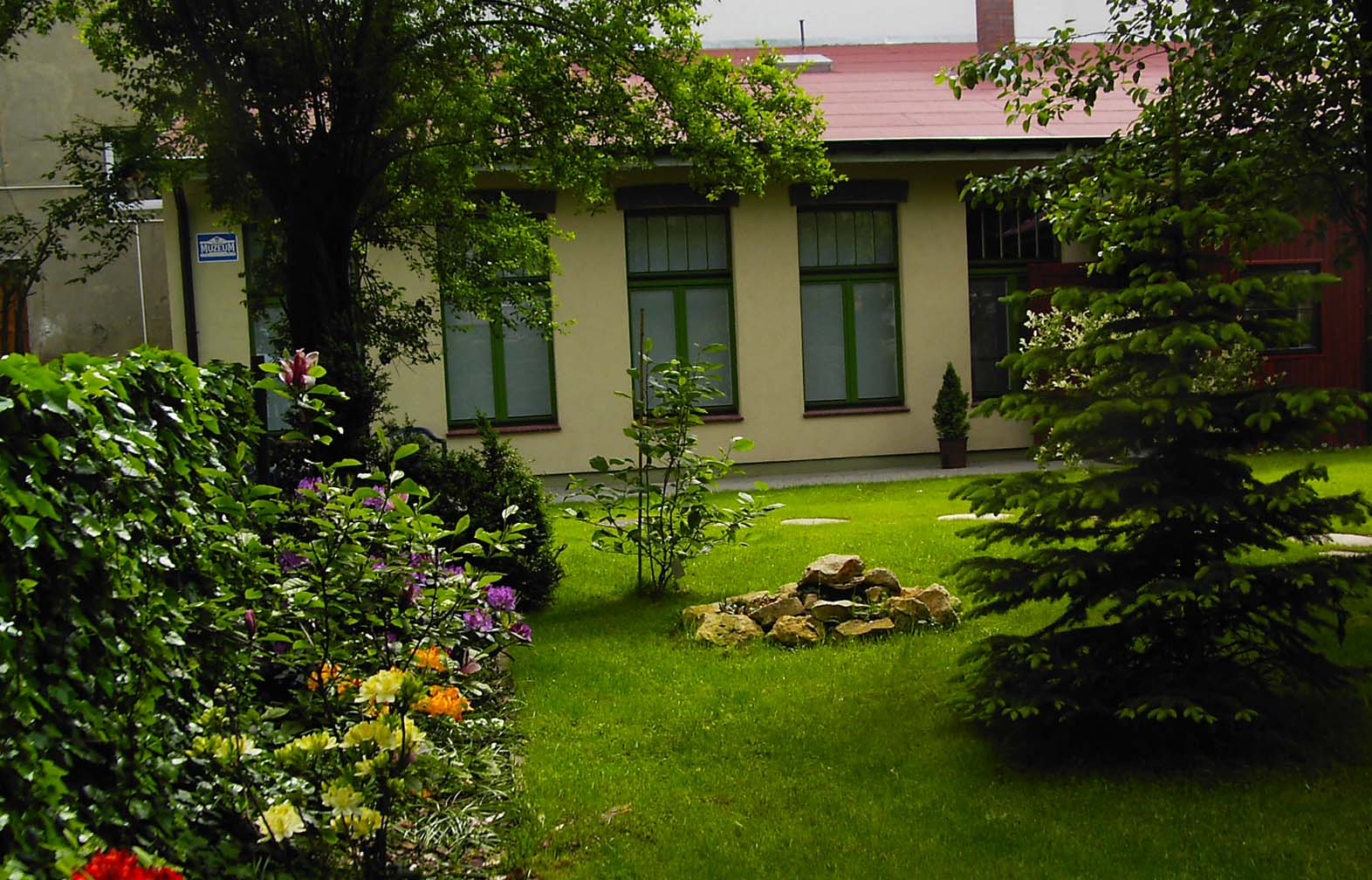
Halina Poświatowska Museum

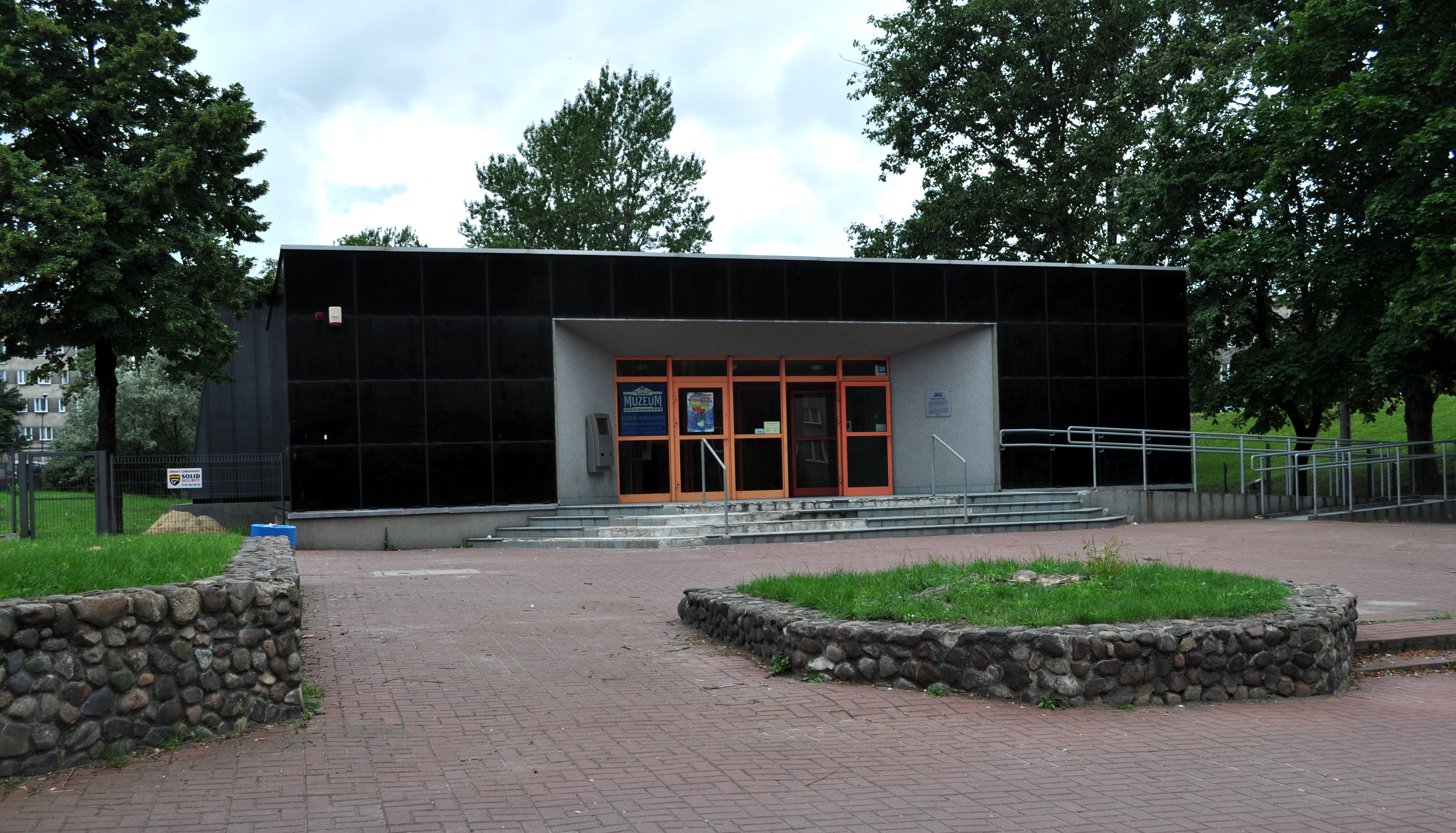
Archaeological Reserve in Częstochowa

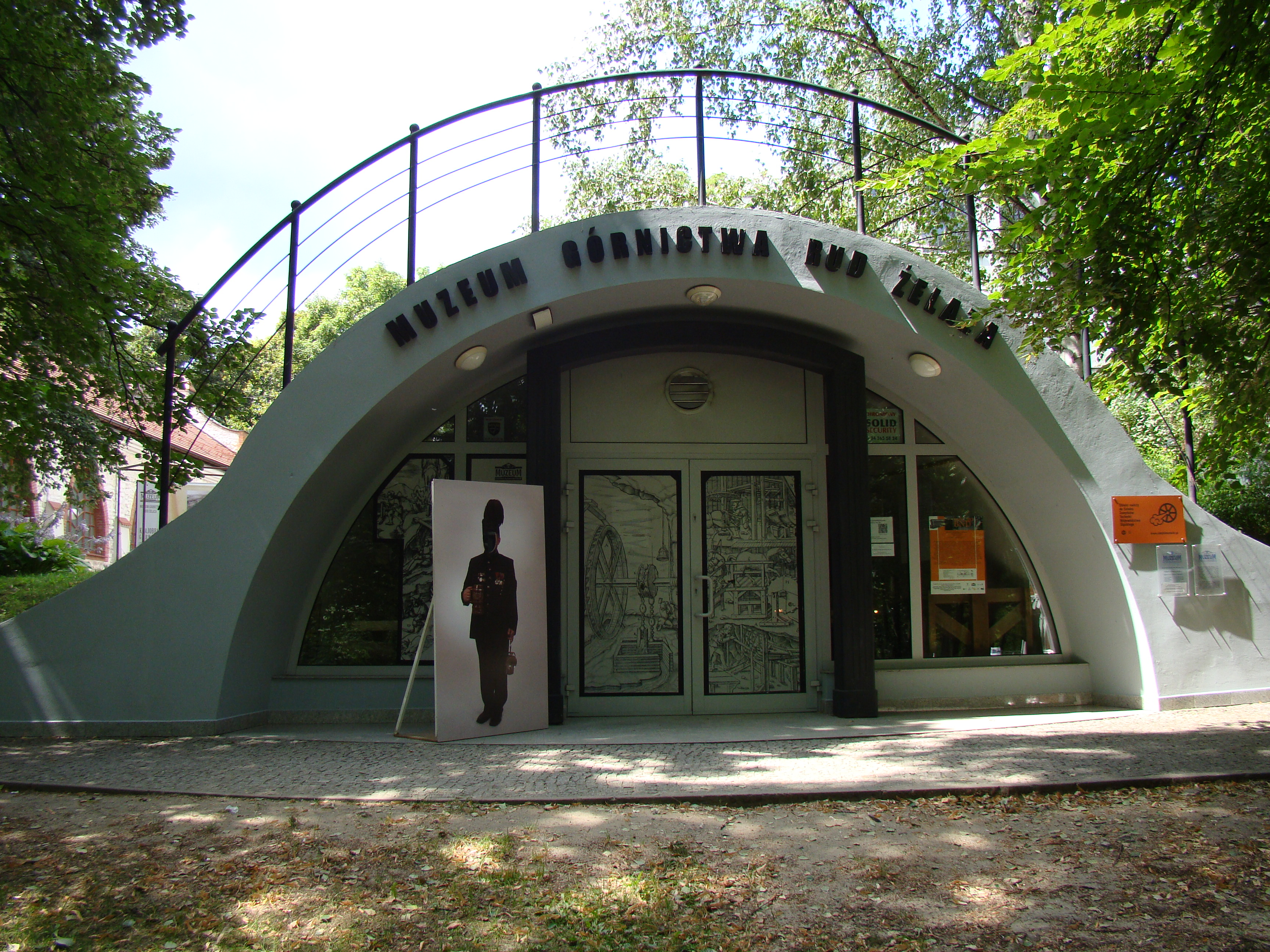
Iron Ore Mining Museum

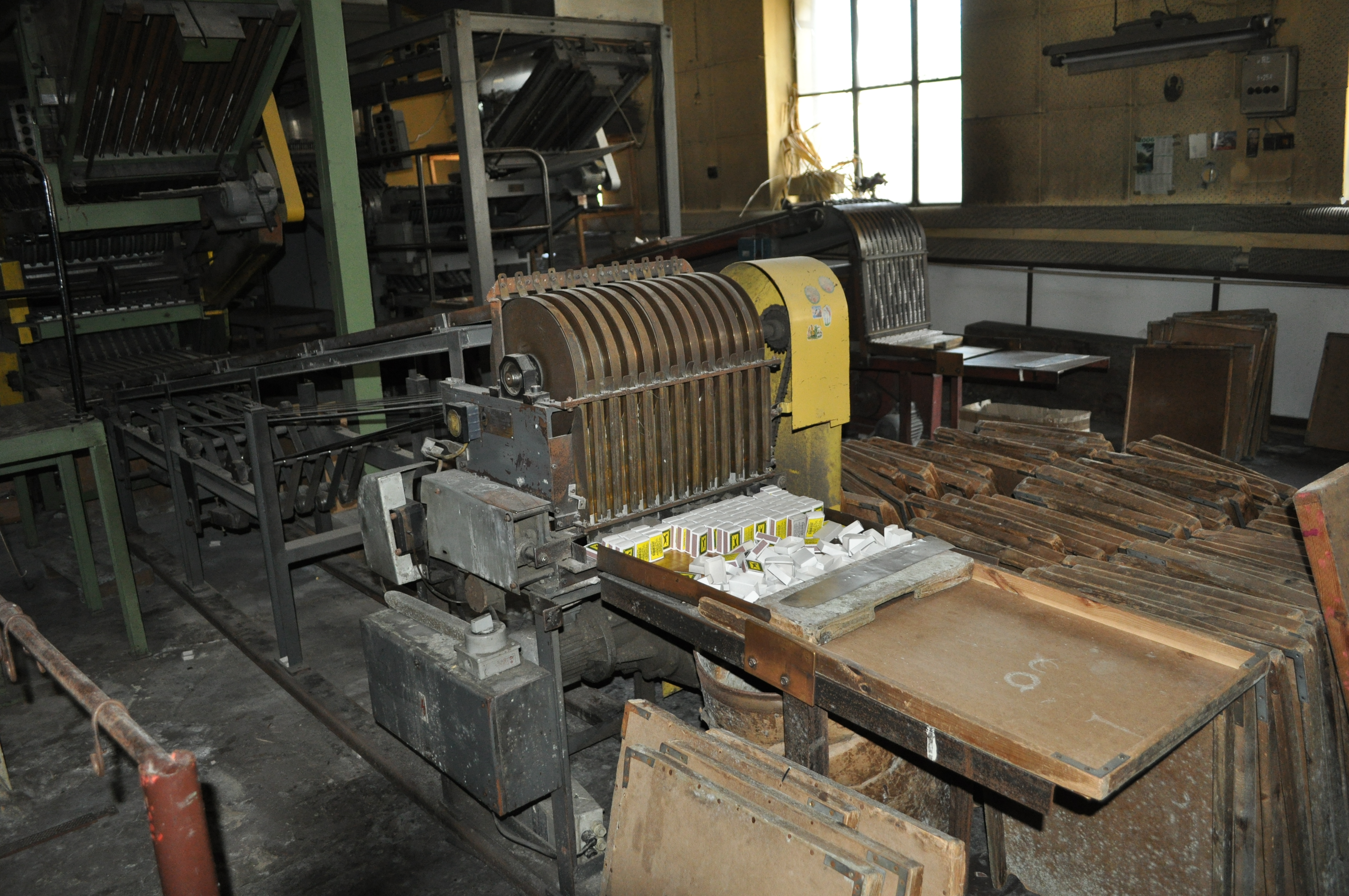
Museum of Match Production

==== Other museums and galleries ====
- City Gallery of Art, established in 1977. Promotes and presents modern art. Zdzisław Beksiński The museum forms part of the City Gallery of Art. It also organises cyclical cultural events such as IV Triennale of Art 'Sacrum', Jurajska Autumn, City Setting.
- Museum of Match Production (pl), located inside the building of a former match factory on Ogrodowa Street. The visitors can see the historic machine park from the late 19th century and retrace the match-making process – from barking through making 'sticks' to packing the matches. In the museum, there are also documents relating to the match-making industry and an exhibition called 'Sculptures from a single match'. In another hall, one can see a phillumenist exhibition, where matchbox labels from various periods are displayed.
- Museum of Railway History, where souvenirs, railway equipment and railway elements are gathered. The museum is located on the first floor of Częstochowa Stradom railway station. It was established in 2001. Two historical steam engines are under the care of the museum.
- Museum of the Roman Catholic Archdiocese of Częstochowa. The museum is located in the building of the Theological College of Roman Catholic Archdiocese of Częstochowa on Św. Barbary Street. It was established in 1997. Among exhibits are sculptures (including Mary the Virgin's sculpture from 1430, sculpture of St Martin from 1500) and pictures showing scenes from the life of Jesus Christ and Mary the Mother of God and saints. Additionally, there are commemoration numismatics and medals.
- Tomasz Sętowski's Museum of Imagination
- Museum of Coins and Medals commemorating John Paul II
- Gallery 'Konduktorownia'

=== Music ===
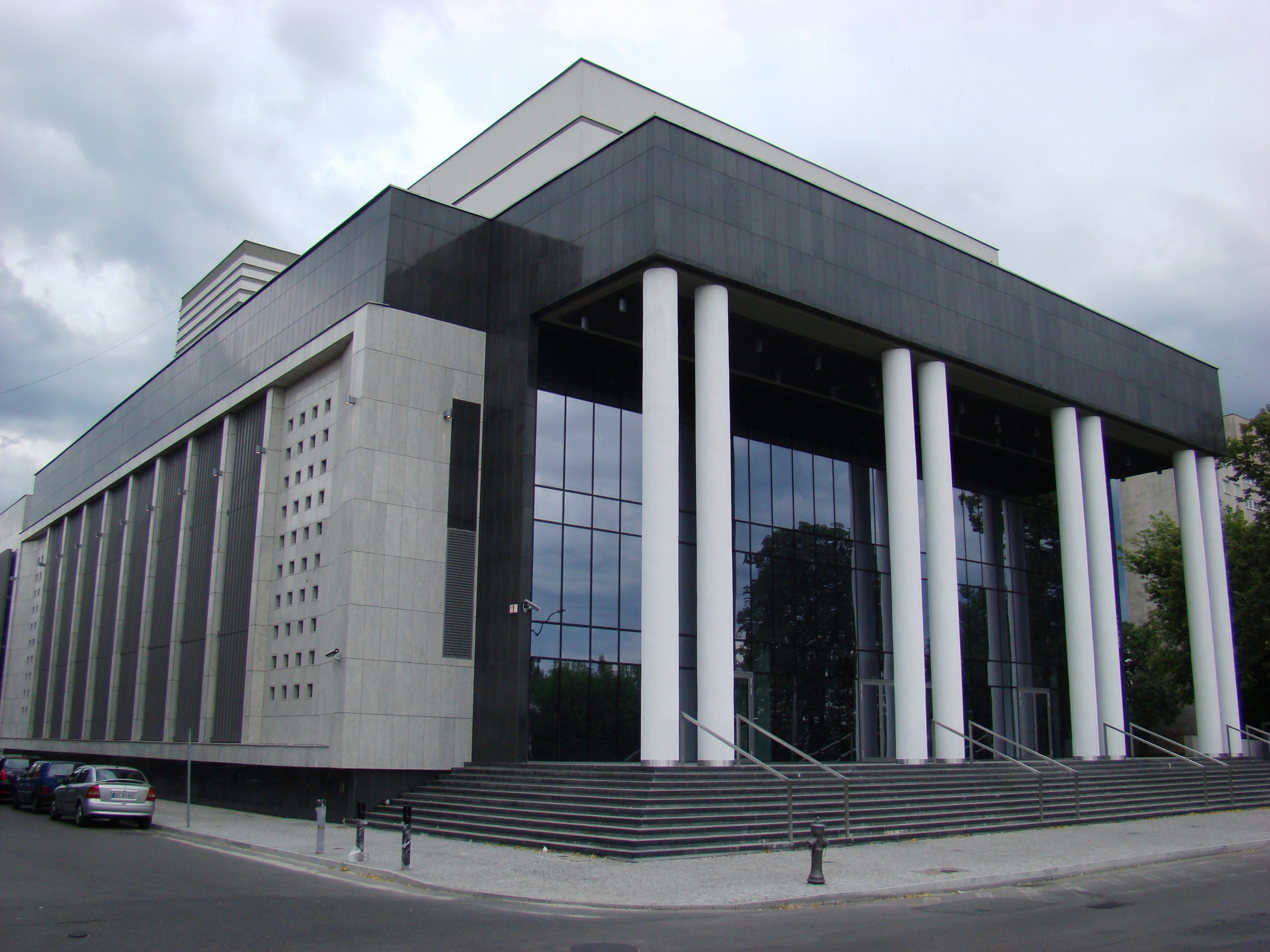
Philharmonic of Częstochowa

The Bronisław Huberman Philharmonic of Częstochowa is located in the city centre on Wilson Street, in the building erected between 1955 and 1965 on foundations of New Synagogue, which had been burnt down on 25 December 1939. The Philharmonic has at its disposal two concert halls and one rehearsal hall. The large concert hall can accommodate 825 people, whilst the small hall has 156 seats.

The concert hall of the Philharmonic of Częstochowa is a place where concerts of symphonic orchestra take place. The building itself is younger than the history of symphonic concerts in Częstochowa, as the first concert took place in March 1945. The mixed choir has been functioning since the Philharmonic was set up. The choir was professionalized in September 2012 and it was named The Częstochowa Philharmonic Choir "Collegium Cantorum".

The Philharmonic is also a co-organiser and a co-performer of operas, operettas and ballets. It is also a place where various exhibitions take place. The Philharmonic annually organises Bronisław Huberman International Violin Festival, Reszek Vocal Competition, Festival of Traditional Jazz "Hot Jazz Spring". The Philharmonic also engages in organising the "Night of Culture", the International Festival of Sacral Music "Gaude Mater" and the Bach Family Music Festival.

Music education is also an important part of the Philharmonic's activity. Its educational functions are carried out through a series of concerts such as "Music for children", "FEEL harmony - feel the climate!" and "Sunday Mornings with Philharmonic". In 2010, the building of The Philharmonic of Cżęstochowa was refurbished through the financial support from the European Fund of Regional Development.

In Częstochowa, there are many functioning female, male and mixed choirs. The oldest is the Male Choir "Pochodnia" (Torch). Others include the Academic Choir of the Częstochowa University of Technology, the Jasna Góra Vocal Ensemble "Camerata" and the Archcathedral Choir of the Holy Family "Basilica Cantans".

=== Theatre ===
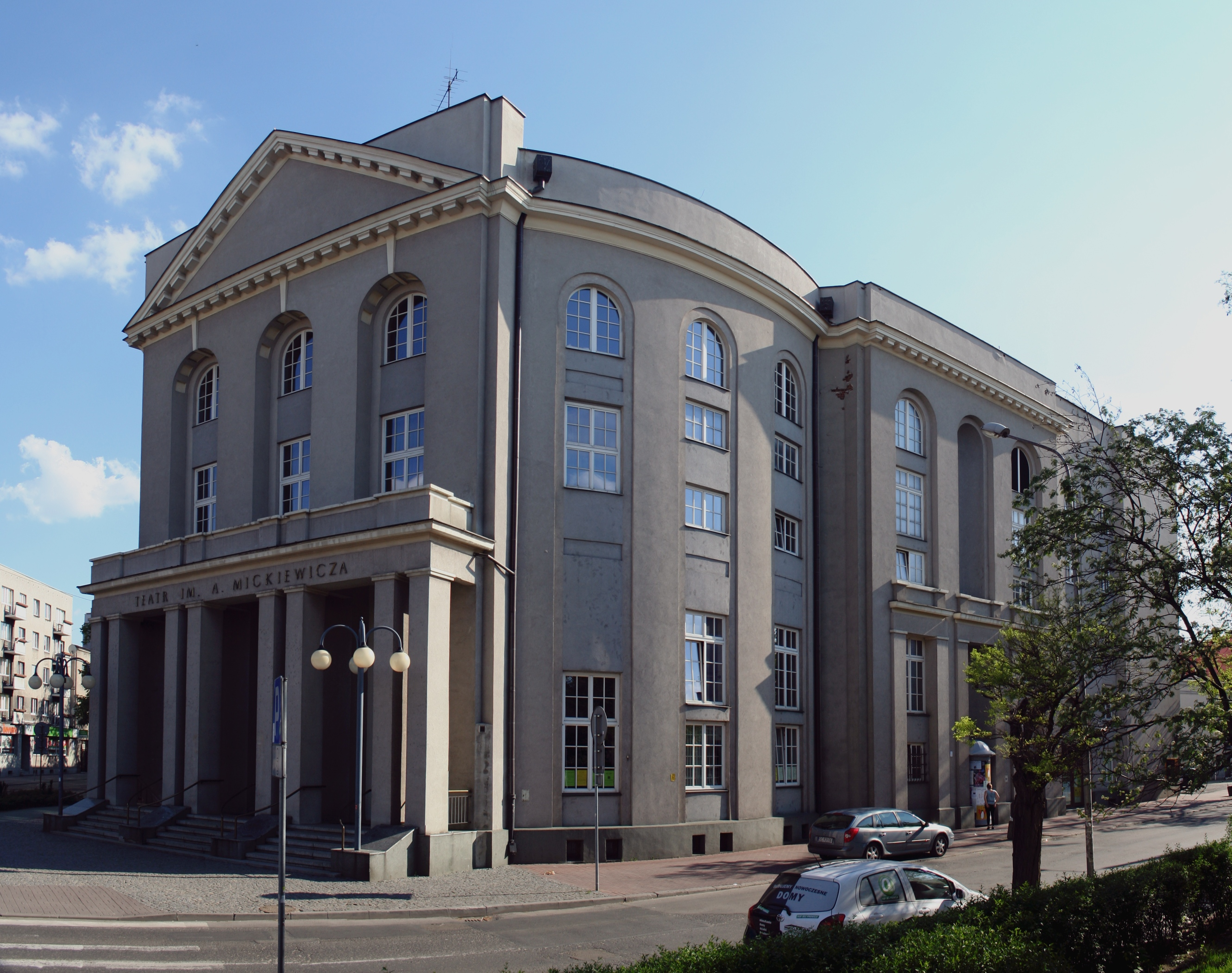
Adam Mickiewicz Theatre

Adam Mickiewicz Theatre is located on Kiliński Street in the city centre. The building was erected between 1928 and 1931. Between 1979 and 1984 it was refurbished. The theatre has three halls: Big, Small, Histrion and Marek Perepeczko Foyer. The Theatre organises "Festival of Important Plays - Through Touch", "Festival of High School Theatres" and "Children's Land of Sensitivity". It also takes part in annually organised "Night of Culture".

==== Festivals ====
The Centre for the Promotion of Culture 'Gaude Mater' is a cultural institution established in 1991. It is the organiser of various cultural events in Częstochowa, such as:

- International Festival of Sacral Music 'Gaude Mater'. It has been organised since 1991 and it takes place each year at the beginning of May. It is organised under the auspices of The Ministry of Culture and National Heritage and the Polish Episcopal Conference. The main aim of the festival is to bring various cultures closer through presenting music typical of different religions. It also seeks to present contemporary Polish music and to promote young composers through "Musica Sacra" - The International Competition for Young Composers. The Gaude Mater festival also addresses problematic aspects of the sacrum in music during various seminars organised during the Festival.
- The Night of Culture, the annual cultural event organised in Częstochowa. For a single fare, one can attend plays, performances, concerts and exhibitions specially prepared for that night.
- Days of Cżęstochowa
- Days of European Folk Culture
- Days of Christian Culture
- Low-key Jazz
- Kalina Jędrusik Festival
- Worldwide Congress of Częstochowians
- The Częstochowa Song and Dance Ensemble operating under the auspices of Gaude Mater

==== Music festivals ====
- The International Festival of Sacral Music "Gaude Mater"
- The International Festival of Traditional Jazz "Hot Jazz Spring Częstochowa"
- Częstochowa Festival of Alternative Culture "Frytka-OFF"
- ReaggeON Częstochowa
- HipHop Elements
- Aleje tu się dzieje (Avenues - Something's going on here)

==== Cinemas ====
In Częstochowa, there are three cinemas. Two are part of chain of cinemas Cinema City Poland: Cinema City "Wolność" (Freedom), which has 1766 seats, and Cinema City Galeria Jurajska, opened in 2009. There is also an independent cinema, Ośrodek Kultury Filmowej (Centre of Cinematography), established in 1991.

== Healthcare ==
Public hospitals

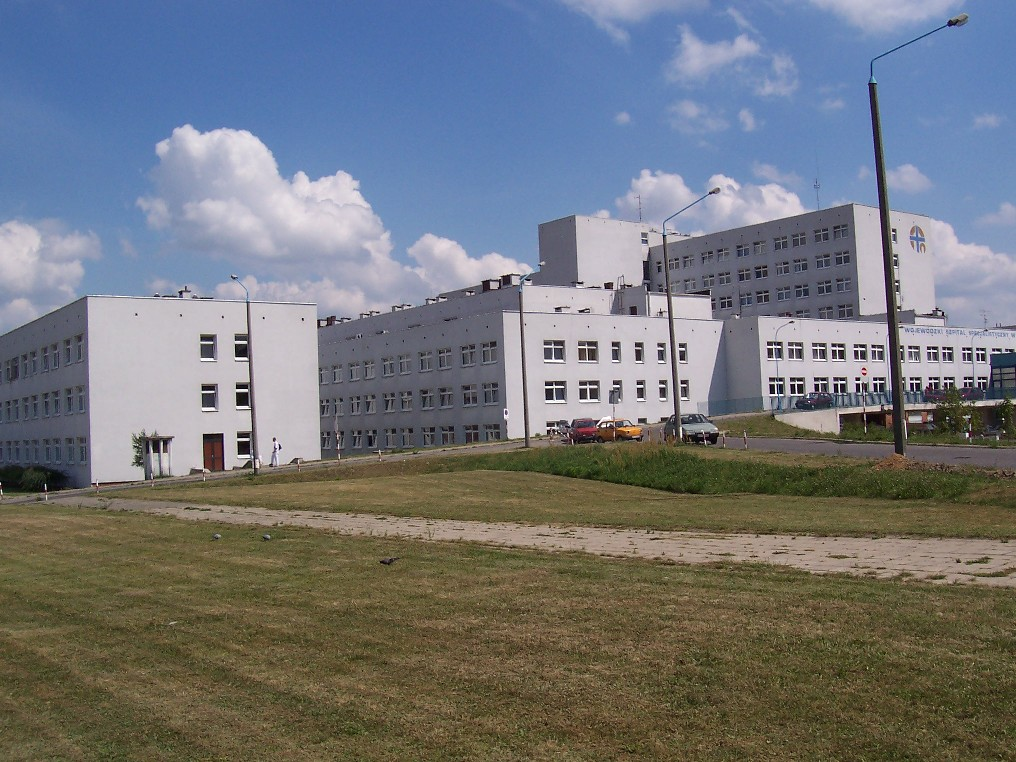
Regional Specialist Hospital – Parkitka, Nowobialska Street

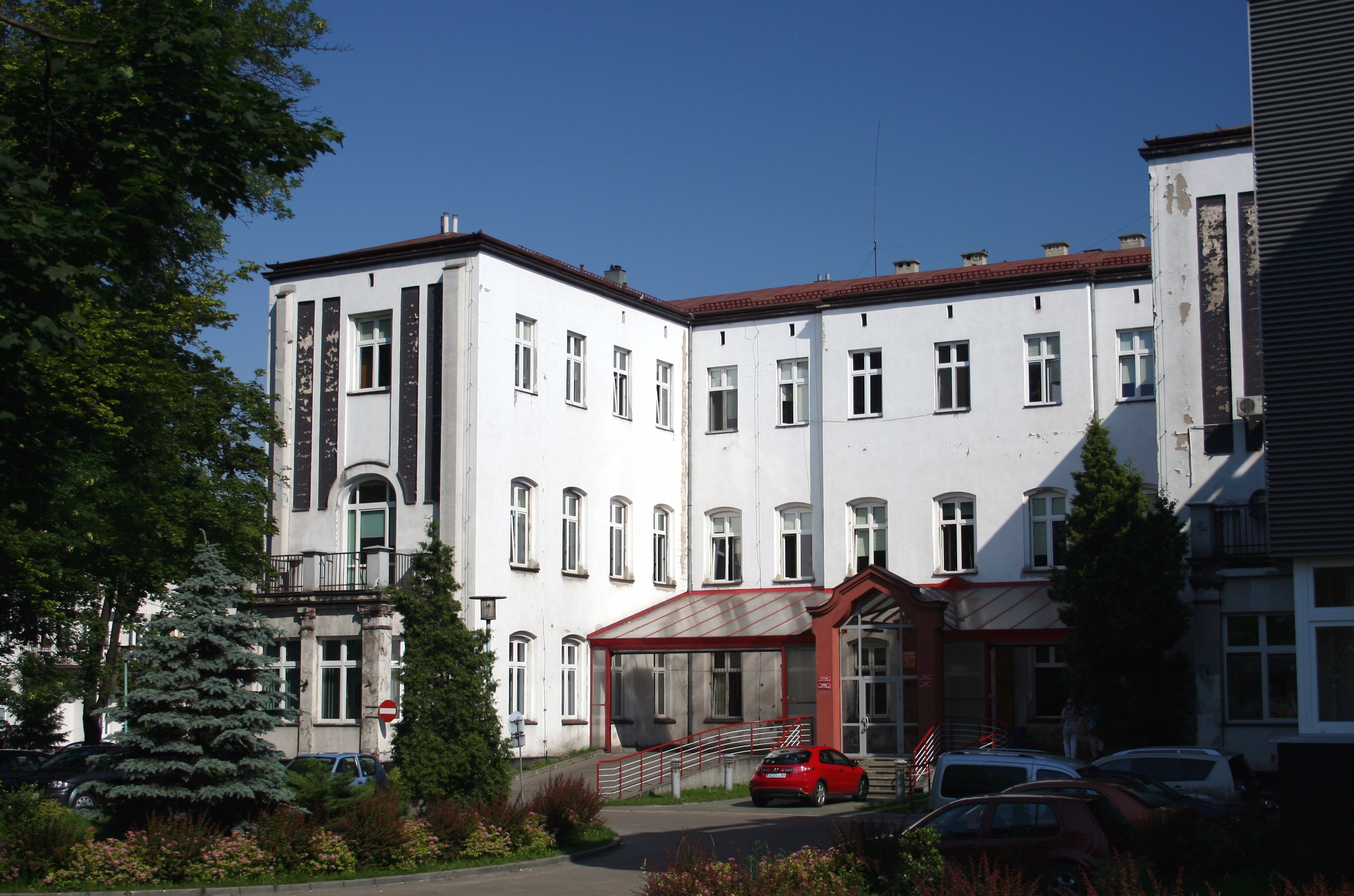
City Polyclinical Hospital – Mirowska Street

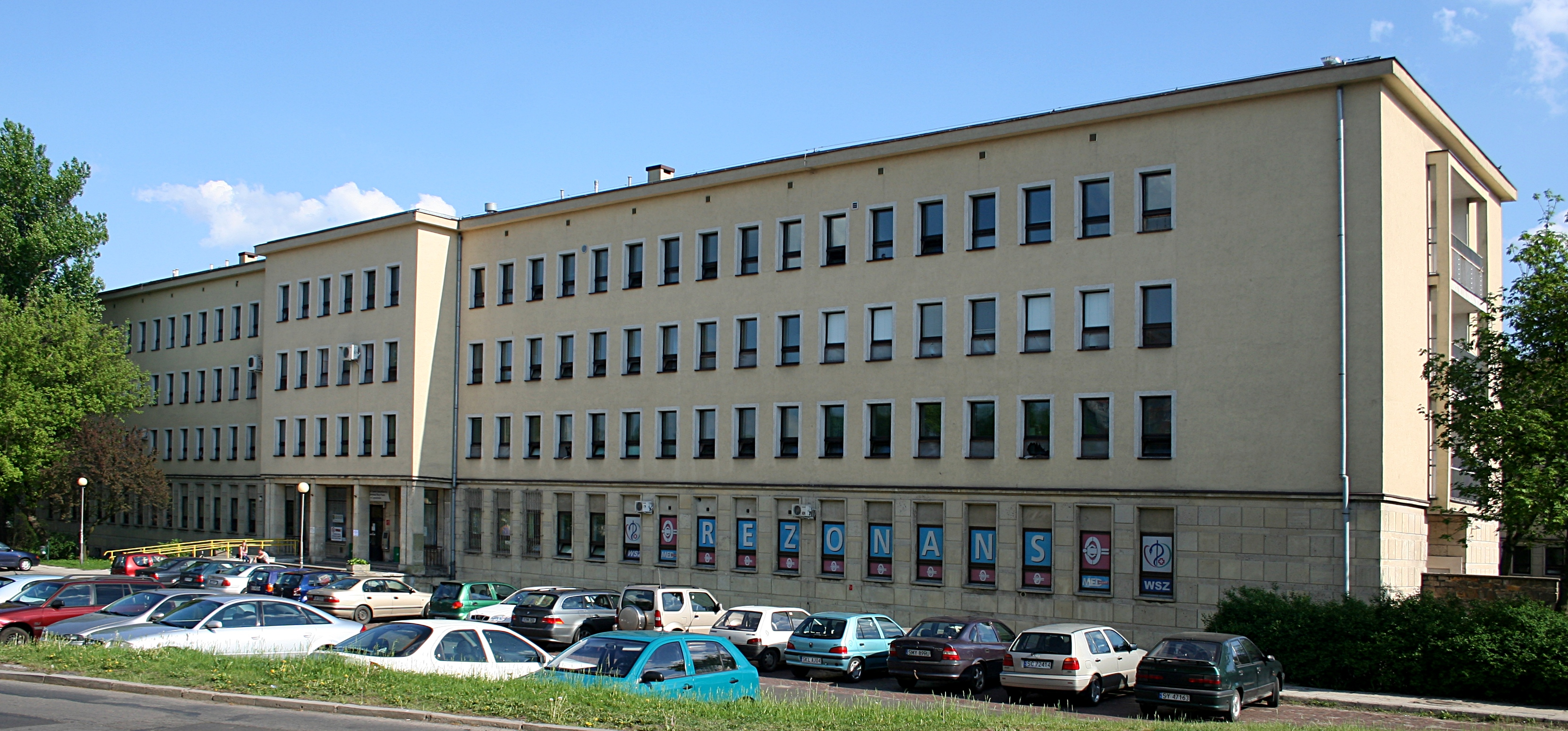
Regional Specialist Hospital – PCK Street

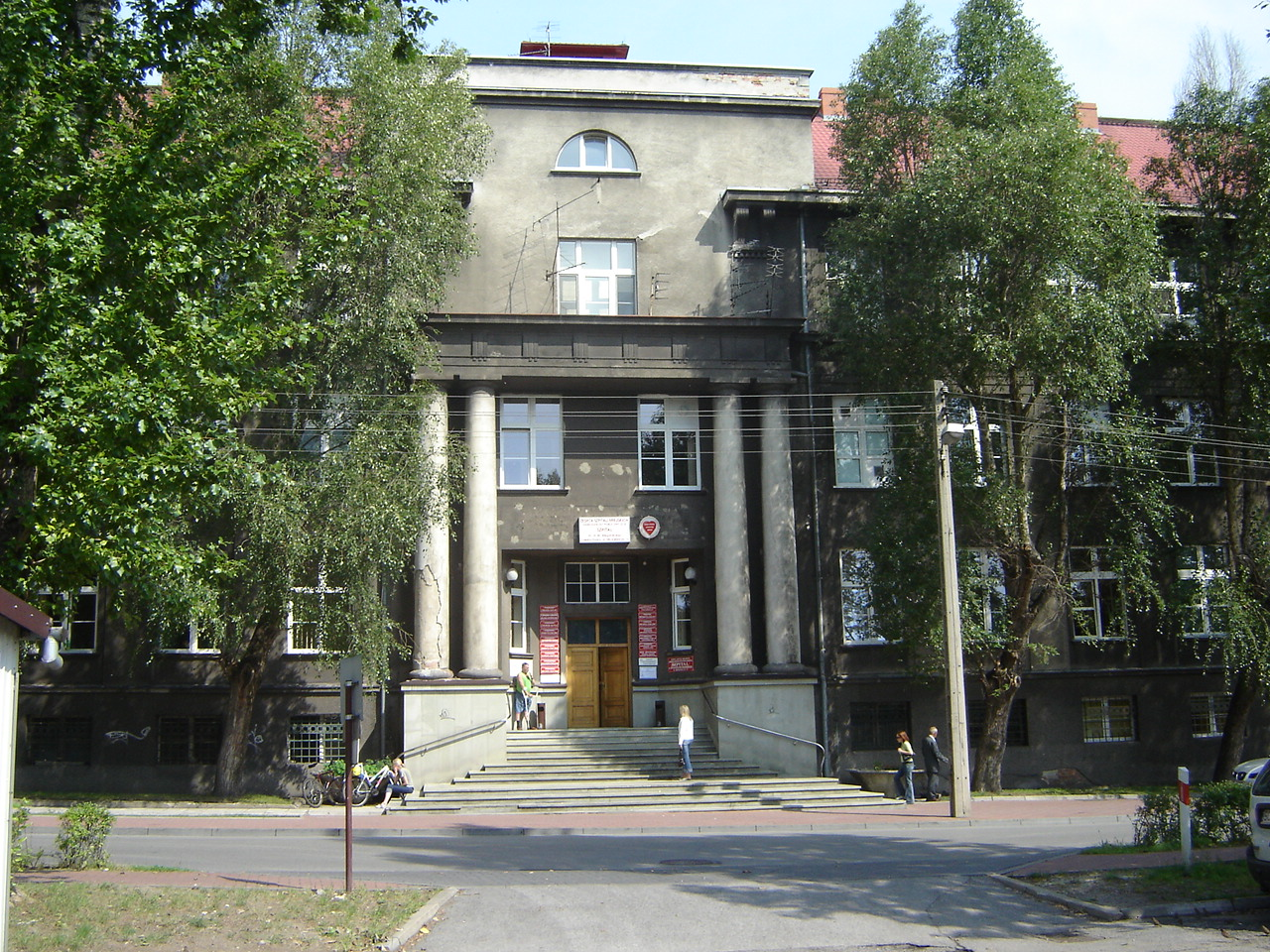
City Polyclinical Hospital – Mickiewicz Street
- Regional Specialist Hospital (Nowobialska Street and PCK Street)
- City Polyclinical Hospital (Bona Street, Mickiewicz Street and Mirowska Street)
- Weigel Hospital in Blachownia
- Metallurgic Hospital in Częstochowa

== Education ==
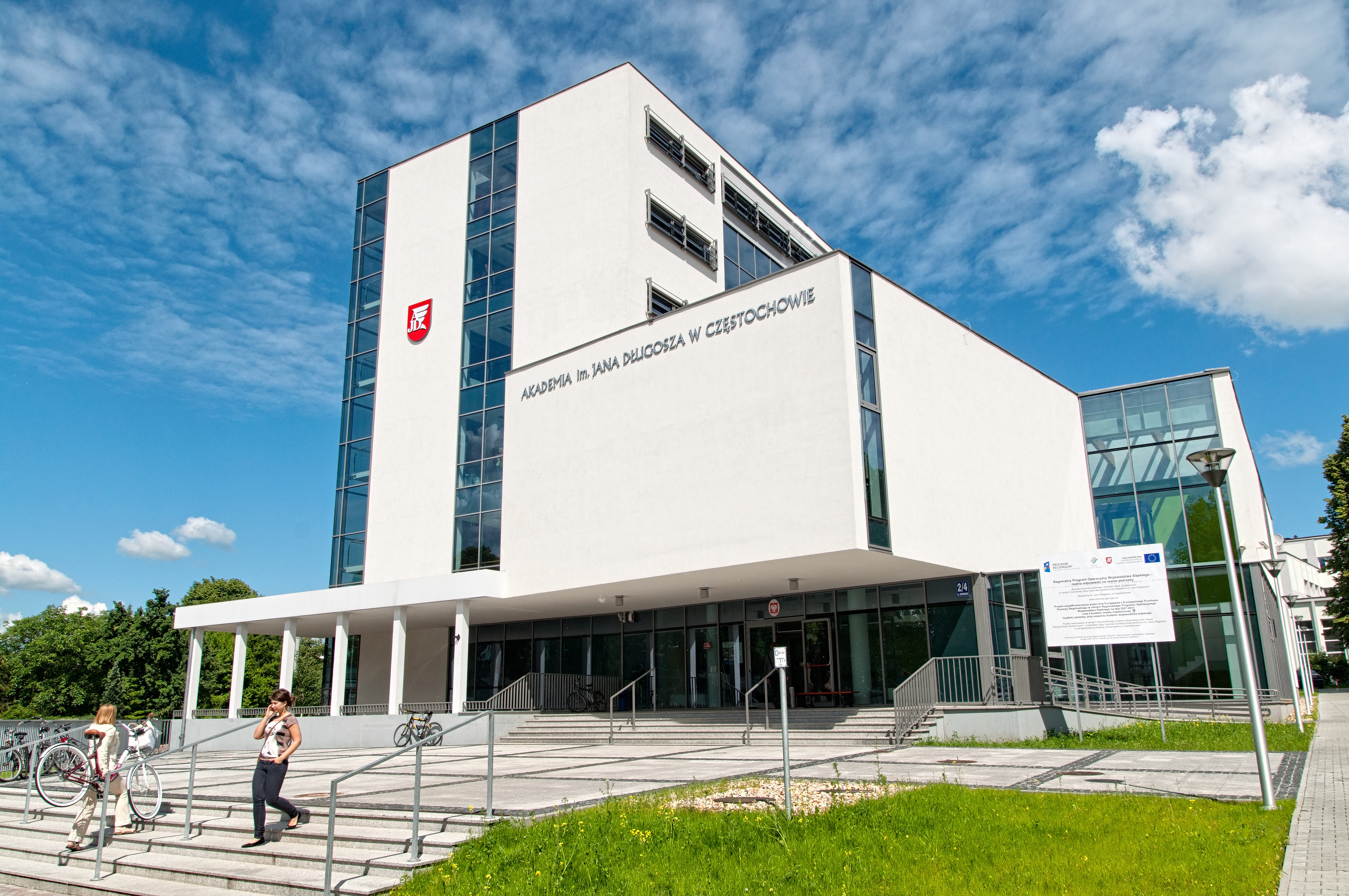
Jan Długosz University

Some of the tertiary educational institutions in Częstochowa include:

- Częstochowa University of Technology
- Jan Długosz University (previously Wyższa Szkoła Pedagogiczna)
- Polonia University (previously Wyższa Szkoła Języków Obcych i Ekonomii)
- Wyższa Szkoła Hotelarstwa i Turystyki (School of Graduate Studies in Hospitality Management and Tourism)
- Wyższa Szkoła Lingwistyczna (College of Foreign Language Studies)
- Wyższa Szkoła Zarządzania (College of Management)
- Centrum Języków Europejskich – Nauczycielskie Kolegium Języków Obcych (Center of European Languages – Teacher's College of Foreign Languages)
- Wyższe Seminarium Duchowne Archidiecezji Częstochowskiej (Theological College of Roman Catholic Archdiocese of Częstochowa)
- Centralna Szkoła Państwowej Straży Pożarnej w Częstochowie (The Central School of the State Fire Services in Częstochowa)

== Sports ==
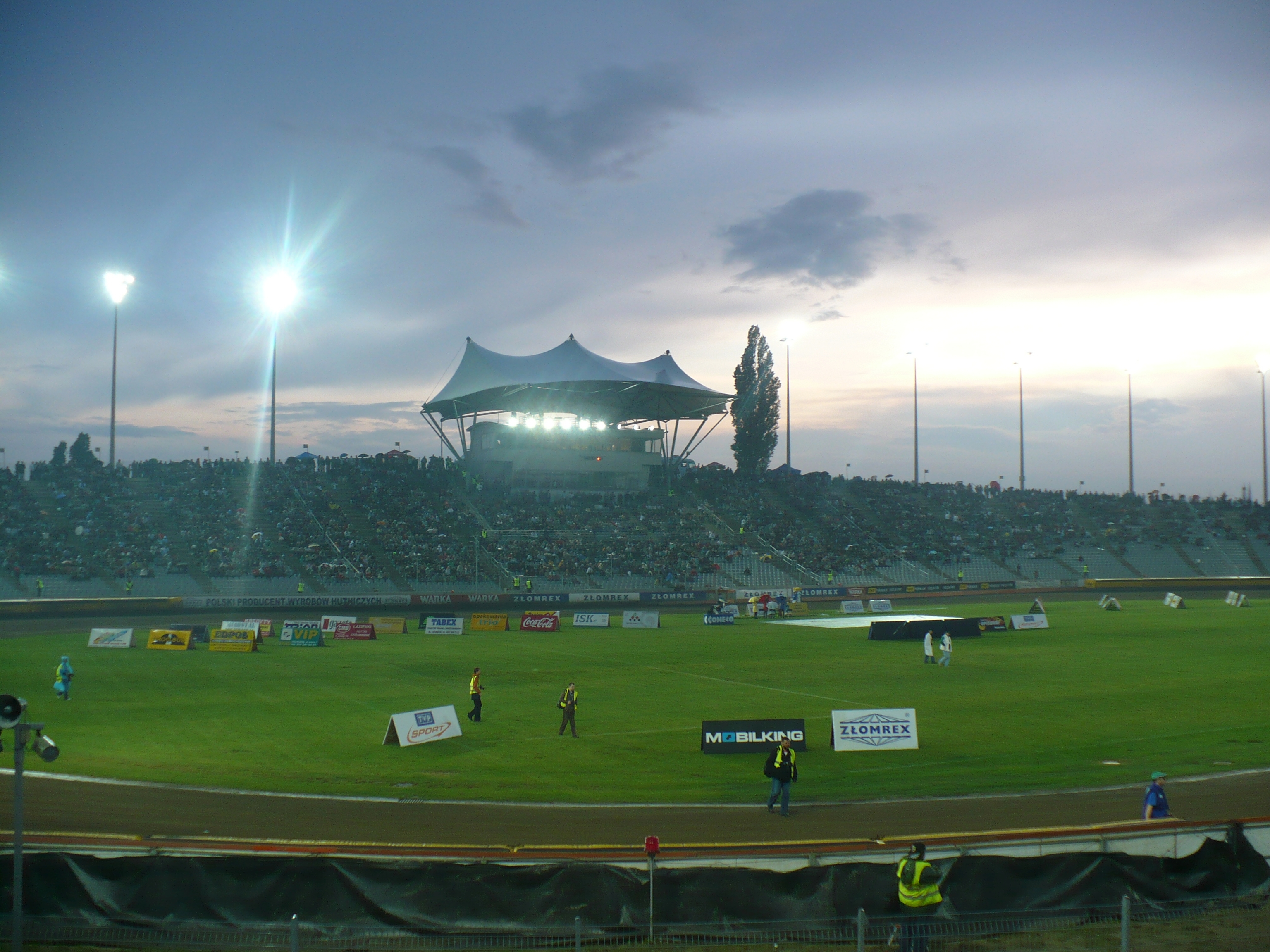
CKM Włókniarz Częstochowa stadium

The most popular sports in Częstochowa are speedway, volleyball and football. The following teams represent Częstochowa on a national level:

=== Speedway ===
- CKM Włókniarz Częstochowa – speedway team from Częstochowa, established in 1946, which competes in the Ekstraliga (top division), four times Polish champions.

=== Volleyball ===
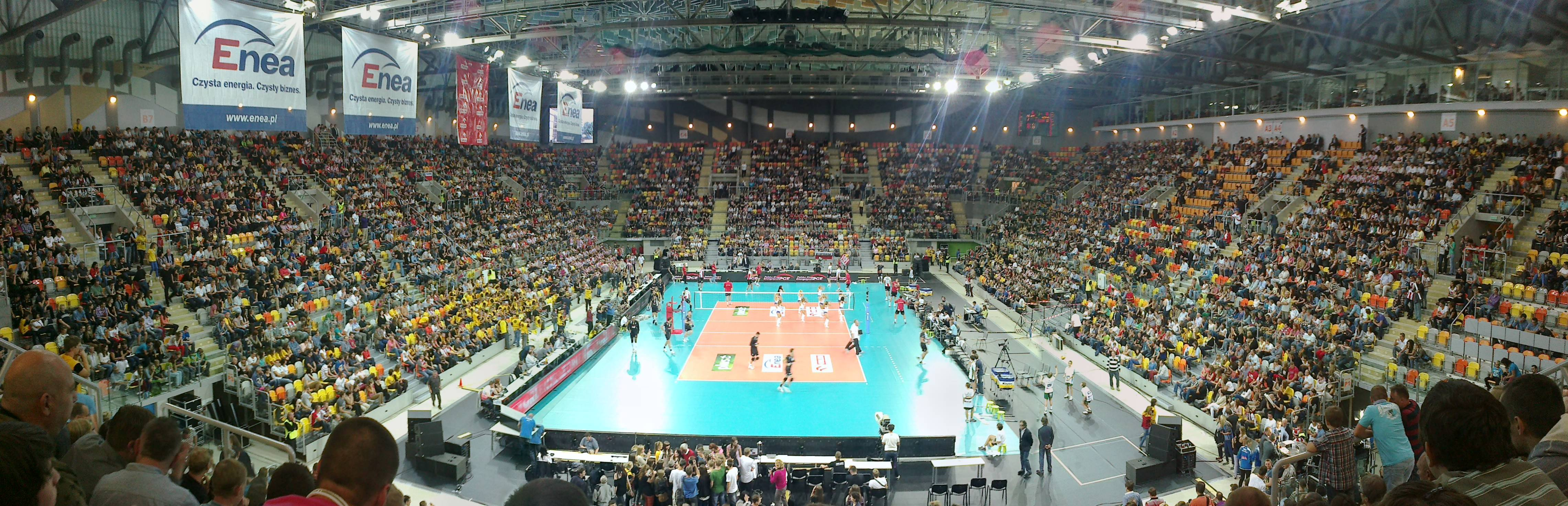
Sports Hall Częstochowa

- AZS Częstochowa – men's volleyball team playing in Krispol 1. Liga Siatkarzy (Polish 2nd Division), six-time Polish champion, six-time second-place in Polish championship, four-time third-place in Polish championship, two-time Polish Cup winner, winner of the CEV Challenge Cup 2011/2012, 16th place and relegation from PlusLiga in season 2016/2017. The club was established in 1945.
- KS Norwid Częstochowa – men's volleyball. The club was established in 2002. Team playing 7 seasons in 1. Liga Siatkarzy (2nd level in the Polish volleyball league system).In 2023 they win league and promoted lever higher. Now playing in best polish league PlusLiga (2023–).
- KS AJD Częstochowianka Częstochowa – women's volleyball team playing in PZPS Druga Liga Kobiet (3rd level in the Polish volleyball league system).

=== Football ===
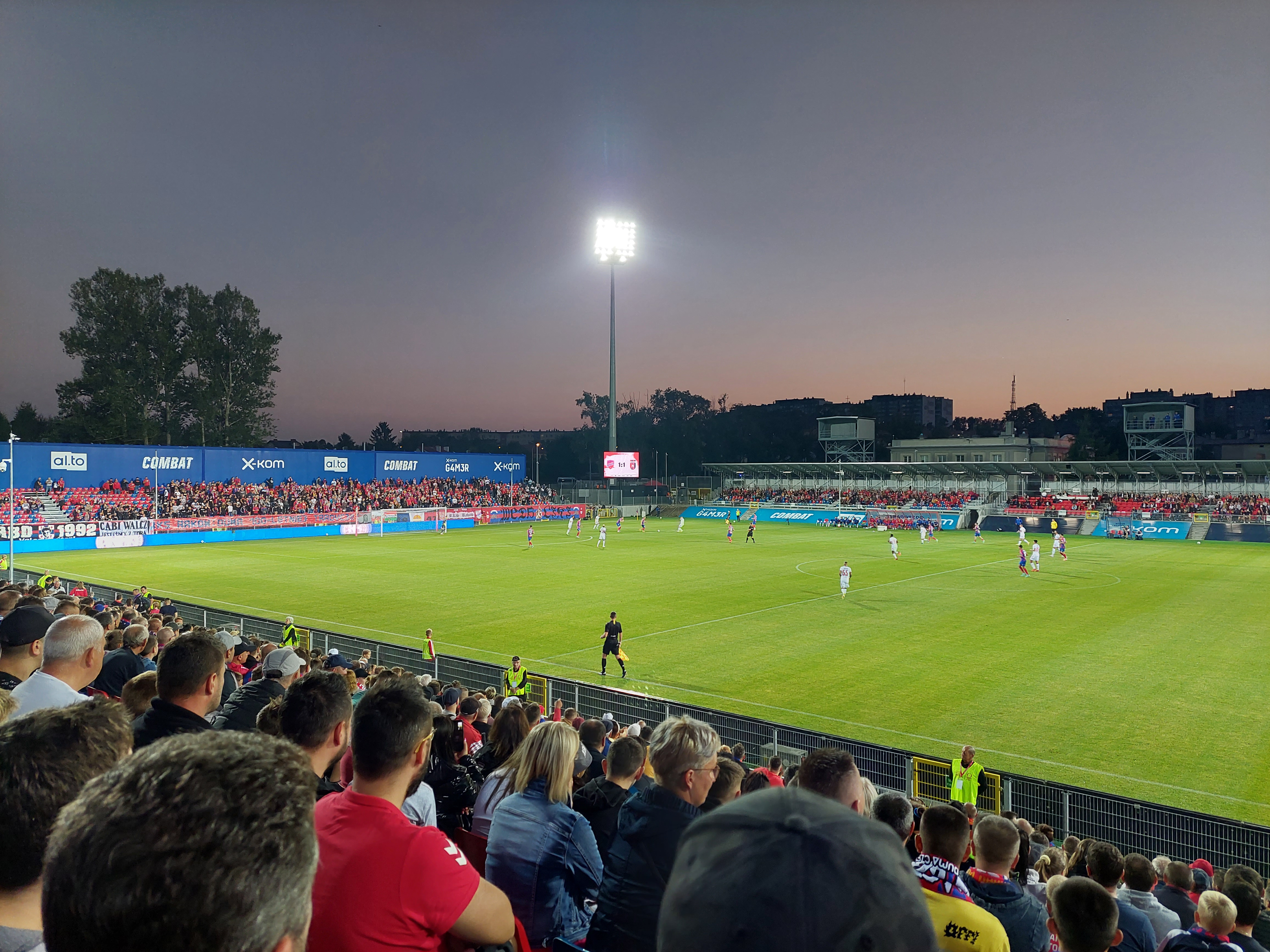
Miejski Stadion Piłkarski "Raków", home venue of Raków Częstochowa

- Raków Częstochowa – Częstochowa's best football team, plays in the Ekstraklasa (top division), 2022–23 Polish Champions and Polish Cup winners in seasons 2020–21 and 2021–22. As youngsters, both Jerzy Brzęczek and Jakub Błaszczykowski played for Raków, as well as Jacek Krzynówek. The club was established in 1921.
- Skra Częstochowa – Częstochowa's second-best football team, plays in the III liga (fourth division) as of 2025–26, but formerly played in the second division. The club was established in 1926.
- Victoria Częstochowa – team playing in Liga Okręgowa – Częstochowa Regional Division (6th level of the Polish football league system). The club was established in 1922.
- KS Stradom Częstochowa – team playing in Liga Okręgowa – Częstochowa Regional Division (6th level of the Polish football league system). The club was established in 1934.
- LKS Płomień Kuźnica Marianowa – team playing in Liga Okręgowa – Częstochowa Regional Division (6th level of the Polish football league system). The club was established in 1982.
- Orzeł Kiedrzyn – team playing in Liga Okręgowa – Częstochowa Regional Division (6th level of the Polish football league system). The club was established in 1950.
- UKS Ajaks Częstochowa – team playing in Klasa B – Częstochowa Regional Division (8th level of the Polish football league system). The club was established in 1998.
- Gol Częstochowa – women's football team playing in I Liga Kobiet (2nd level of the Polish female football league system). The club was on sixth place in season 2014/15.

=== Other teams ===
- KU AZS Częstochowa – Częstochowa's basketball team, plays in Druga Liga PzKosz (4th level of the Polish basketball league system)
- Rugby Club Częstochowa – Częstochowa's rugby team, plays in Polish 3rd League rugby XV and in 7's League, established in 2005
- Saints Częstochowa – American football team playing in PLFA II. The club was established in 2010.
- Defenders Częstochowa – Baseball team playing in Polish Baseball 2nd League. The club was established in 2013.
- Table Tennis – AJD Print Cycero Rolnik AZS Częstochowa, AZS AJD Mustang Częstochowa
- Tennis – CzKT Victoria
- Badminton – Kolejarz Częstochowa
- Chess – Hetman Częstochowa
- Weightlifting – KS Polonia Częstochowa
- Velodrome team – Lwy Częstochowa

=== Sport venues ===
- Arena Częstochowa – multifunctional stadium located in Zawodzie district. It is mostly used by the speedway club Włókniarz Częstochowa. The stadium was built in 1946. Following the modernisation, it can accommodate 16,850 spectators.
- Sports Hall Częstochowa – multifunctional sports hall located in Zawodzie district. It can accommodate 7,100 spectators. It meets all the criteria as set out by the FIVB and FIBA. It was officially opened on 29 September 2012. The hall has hosted various events including volley league matches of AZS Częstochowa, boxing fights and concerts.
- Polonia Hall – multifunctional sports hall in Tysiąclecie district. The hall was officially opened in 1985. It is administered by the City Council Centre of Sport and Leisure. The hall is mostly used by volleyball and basketball teams. It can accommodate 3,015 spectators.
- Miejski Stadion Piłkarski "Raków" – a football stadium located in Raków district. It is mostly used by Raków Częstochowa and Gol Częstochowa. The stadium was officially opened in 1955. Currently, it can accommodate up to 8,000 spectators. The stadium has 3,720 seats. There are further plans for modernisation, which include increasing the number of seats to 10,100.
- City Athletics Stadium – a stadium administered by the City Council Centre of Sport and Leisure. The stadium was built in 1965, but extensively modernised in 2000. The stadium has 894 seats.
- Rosa Private Golf Club – located in Konopiska, 17 km (11 mi) from Częstochowa
- Three indoor swimming pools and one outdoor swimming pool

== Administration ==
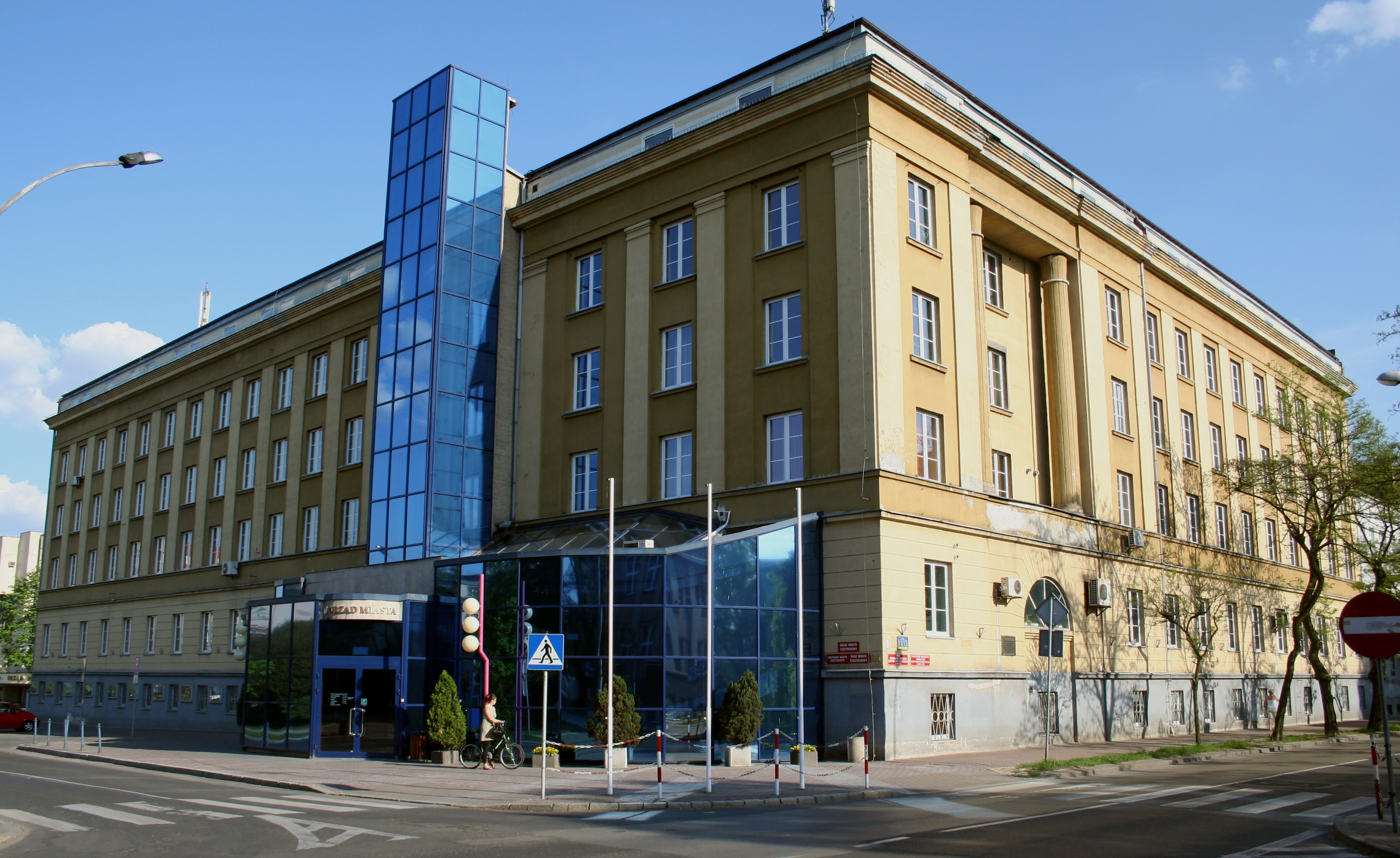
Municipal office

Częstochowa is a city with powiat rights. Residents of Częstochowa elect 28 city councillors. The executive branch of local government is a city mayor. The city hall is located in Śląska Street 11/13.

The city is divided into 20 neighborhoods. The residents of each neighborhood elect Neighborhood Council members.

The neighborhoods of Częstochowa include: Błeszno, Częstochówka-Parkitka, Dźbów, Gnaszyn-Kawodrza, Grabówka, Kiedrzyn, Lisiniec, Mirów, Ostatni Grosz, Podjasnogórska, Północ, Raków, Stare Miasto, Stradom, Śródmieście, Trzech Wieszczów, Tysiąclecie, Wrzosowiak, Wyczerpy-Aniołów, and Zawodzie-Dąbie.

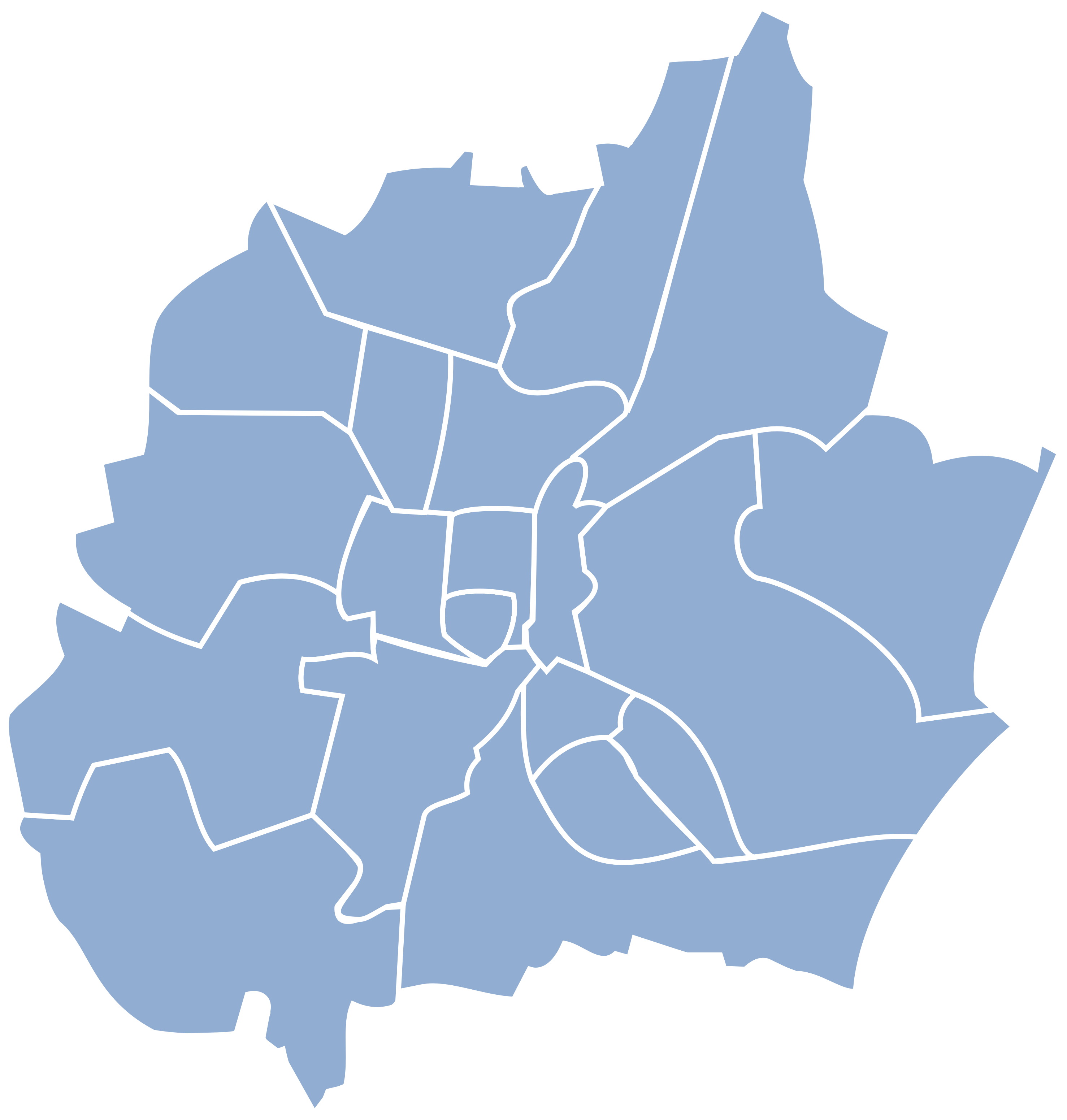
Map of Częstochowa's neighborhoods

== Politics ==
=== Local government ===
The current mayor of Częstochowa is Krzysztof Matyjaszczyk, a member of Democratic Left Alliance.

In the Częstochowa 2018 mayoral elections the results were as follows: Krzysztof Matyjaszczyk (Democratic Left Alliance) 59.76%, Artur Warzocha (Law and Justice) 25.54%, Marcin Maranda (Residents of Częstochowa) 6.17%, Tomasz Jaskóła (Kukiz'15) 5.27%, Jacek Krawczyk (Civic Coalition) 2.83%, Martin Saczek (Razem) 0.43%.

In the Częstochowa City Council Elections 2018 the results were as follows. Seats in the city council: Left Democratic Alliance (32.80%) 12, Law and Justice (26.04%) 10, Civic Coalition (15.98%) 5, Together for Częstochowa (Independents) (8.77%) 1. After elections in Częstochowa was formed a centre-left coalition between liberal and Pro-Market Civic Coalition and social democratic Left Democratic Alliance. Conservative Law and Justice remained in opposition.

=== Electoral districts ===
District	Seats
1. District (central): Podjasnogórska, Stare Miasto, Śródmieście, Trzech Wieszczów	SLD (2); PiS (2); KO (1)
2. District (northwestern): Częstochówka-Parkitka, Kiedrzyn, Tysiąclecie	SLD (2); PiS (2); KO (1)
3. District (northeastern): Mirów, Północ, Wyczerpy-Aniołów, Zawodzie-Dąbie	SLD (2); PiS (2); KO (1); Independent (1)
4. District (southeastern): Ostatni Grosz, Raków, Wrzosowiak	SLD (4); PiS (2); KO (1)
5. District (southwestern): Błeszno, Dźbów, Gnaszyn-Kawodrza, Grabówka, Lisiniec, Stradom	SLD (2); PiS (2); KO (1)

=== Częstochowa constituency ===
lower house of Parliament (Sejm)	higher house of Parliament (Senate)	Silesian Regional Assembly
Szymon Giżyński (PiS), Mariusz Trepka (PiS), Lidia Burzyńska (PiS), Andrzej Gawron (PiS), Izabela Leszczyna (KO), Andrzej Szewiński (KO), Zdzisław Wolski (SLD)	Wojciech Konieczny (SLD), Ryszard Majer (PiS)	Marta Salwierak (KO), Stanisław Gmitruk (PSL), Gabriela Łacna (SLD), Beata Kocik (PiS), Piotr Bańka (PiS)

== Media ==
Daily newspapers

- Gazeta Wyborcza – since 1991 it has been published with a local supplement
- Dziennik Zachodni – published with local supplement
- Życie Częstochowy i Powiatu (Life of Częstochowa and Region) – it has been published since 1947

Weeklies

- Gazeta Częstochowska (Częstochowa's newspaper) – since 1956
- Częstochowski Tygodnik Regionalny – 7 dni (Częstochowa's Regional Weekly – 7 days) – since 2004
- Niedziela (Sunday) – nationwide Catholic weekly newspaper that has been published since 1926
- Poniedziałek (Monday)
- Tydzień w Czestochowie.pl

There are also published cultural quarterlies such as: Aleje 3, Bulion; a monthly Puls Regionu and an annual – Ziemia Częstochowska

Radio and TV

- Radio Jasna Góra – Catholic radio station broadcast from the Jasna Góra Monastery
- Radio Fiat – Catholic radio station belonging to the Roman Catholic Archdiocese of Częstochowa
- Radio Jura – local radio station
- Polskie Radio Katowice
- Radio Złote Przeboje
- RMF Classic
- RMF Maxxx
- TV Orion

== Religion and places of worship ==
Prominent churches

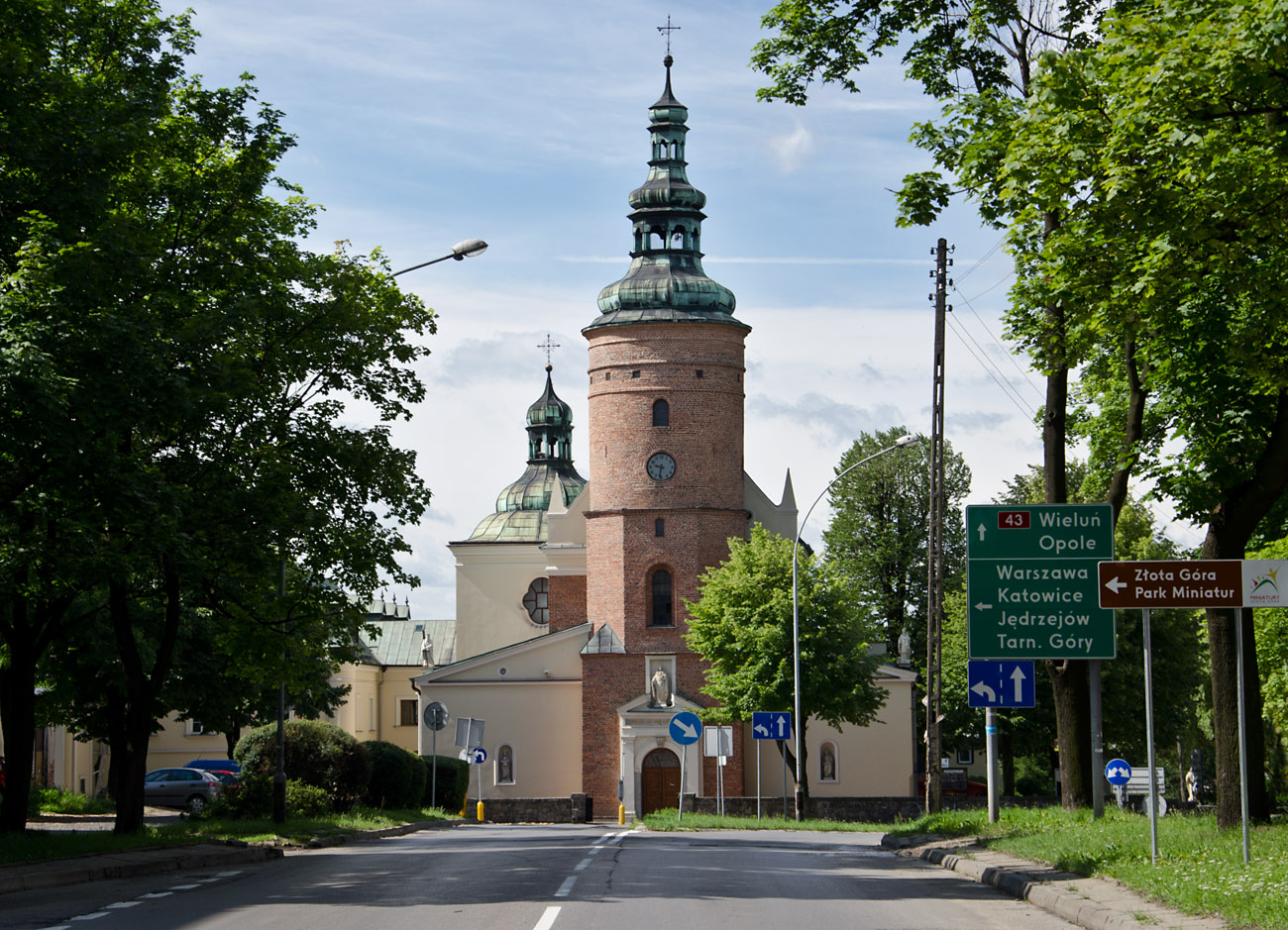
St Barbara and St Andrew Church

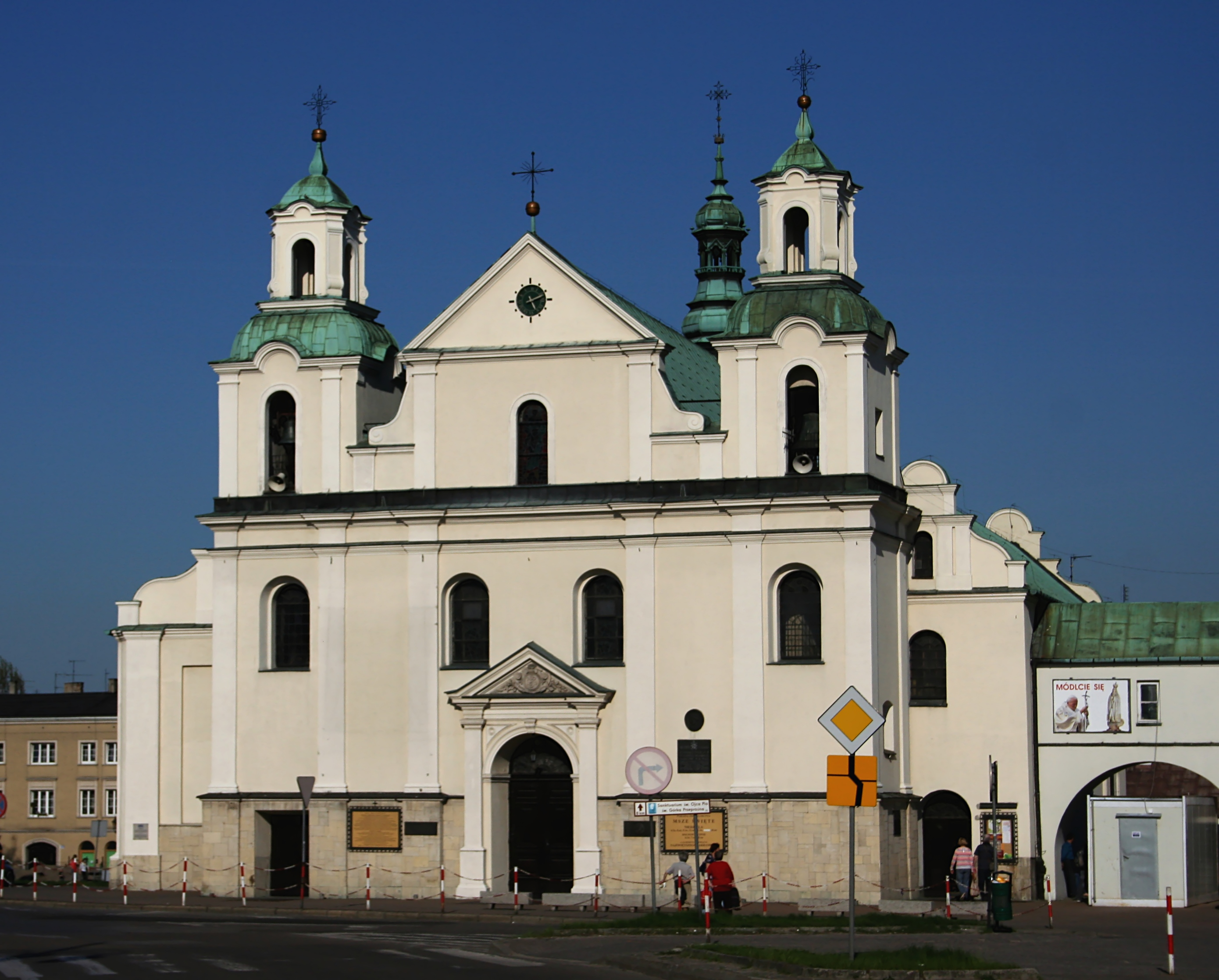
St Sigismund Church

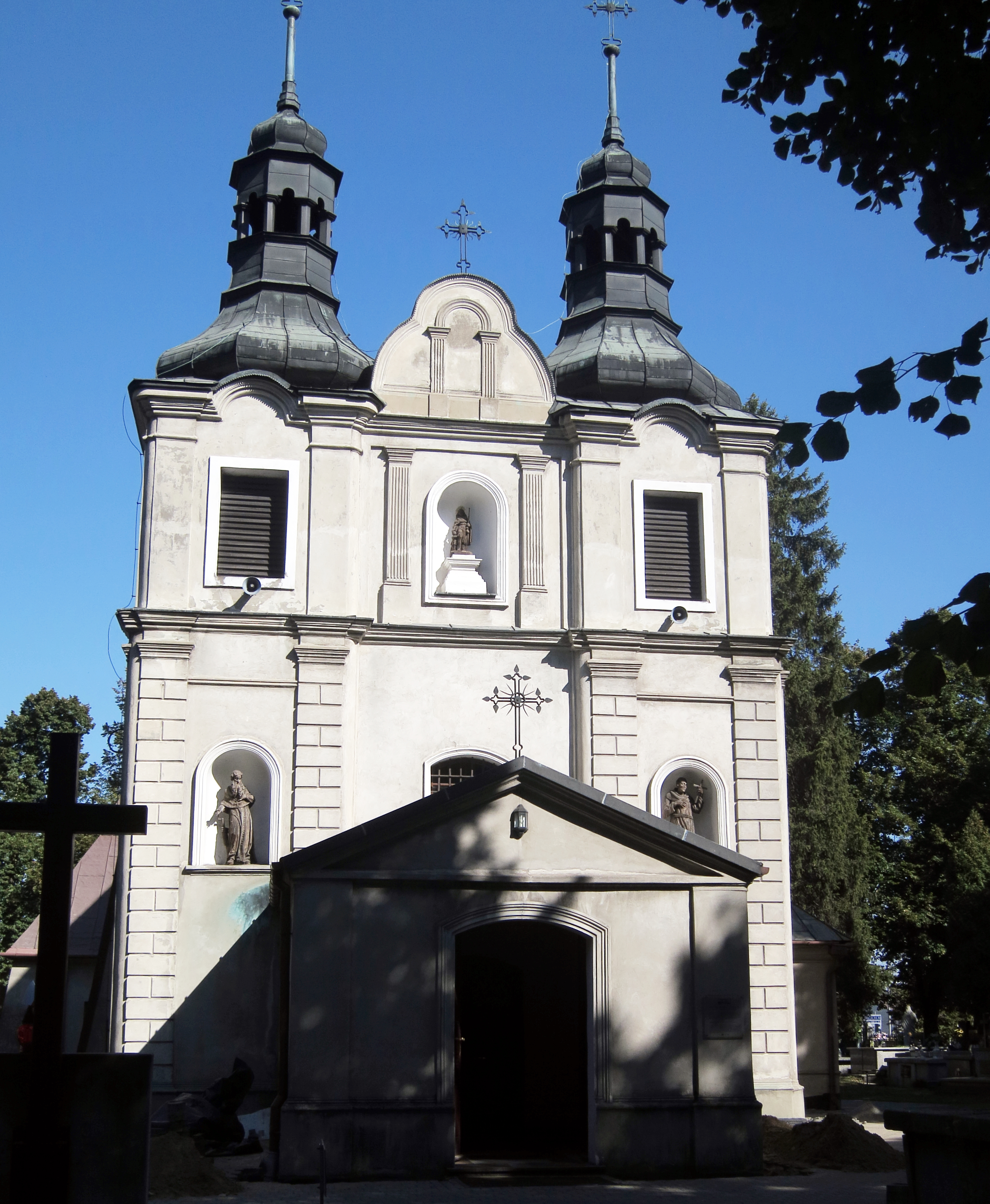
St Roch and Sebastian Church

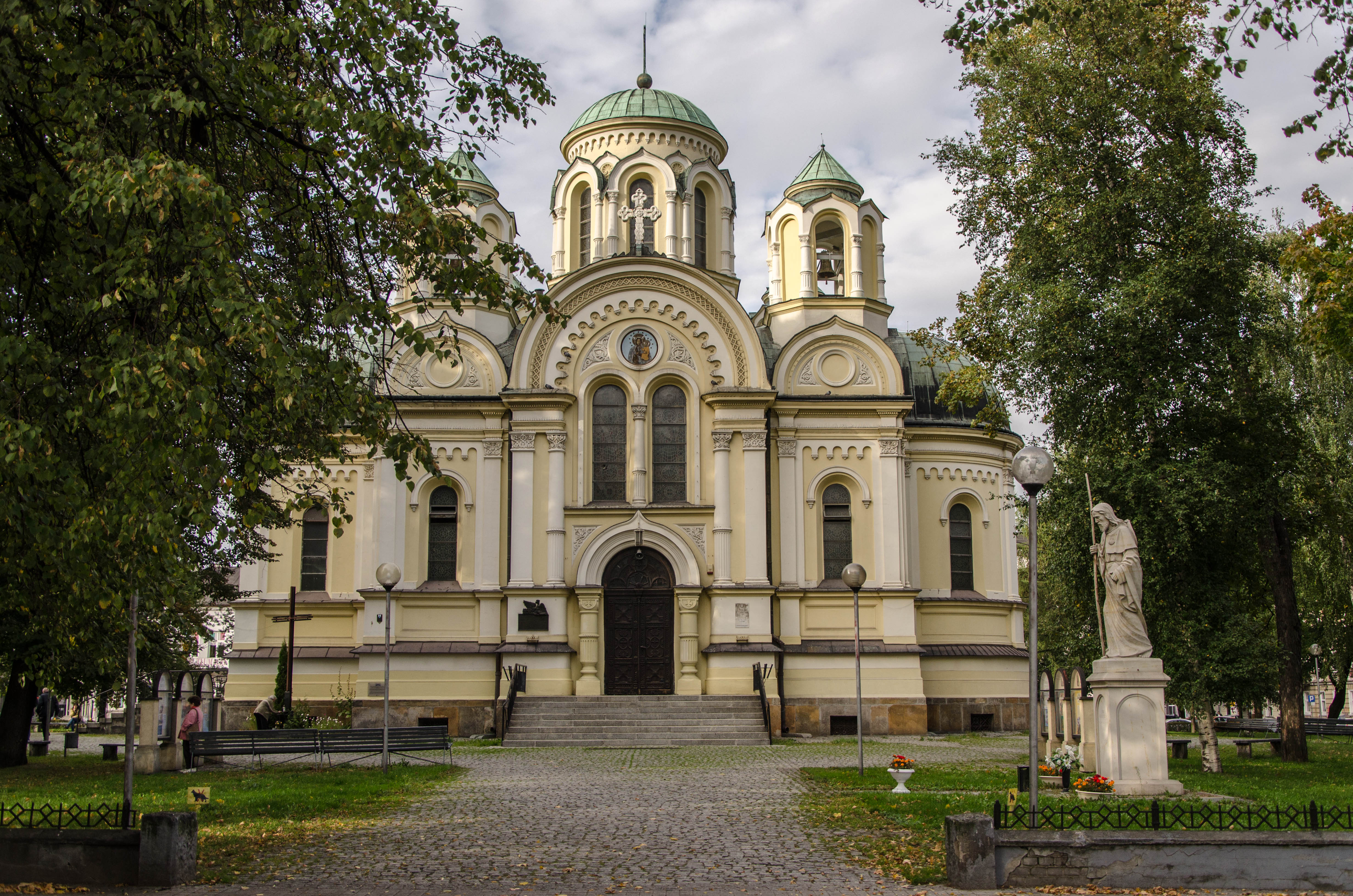
Saint James church

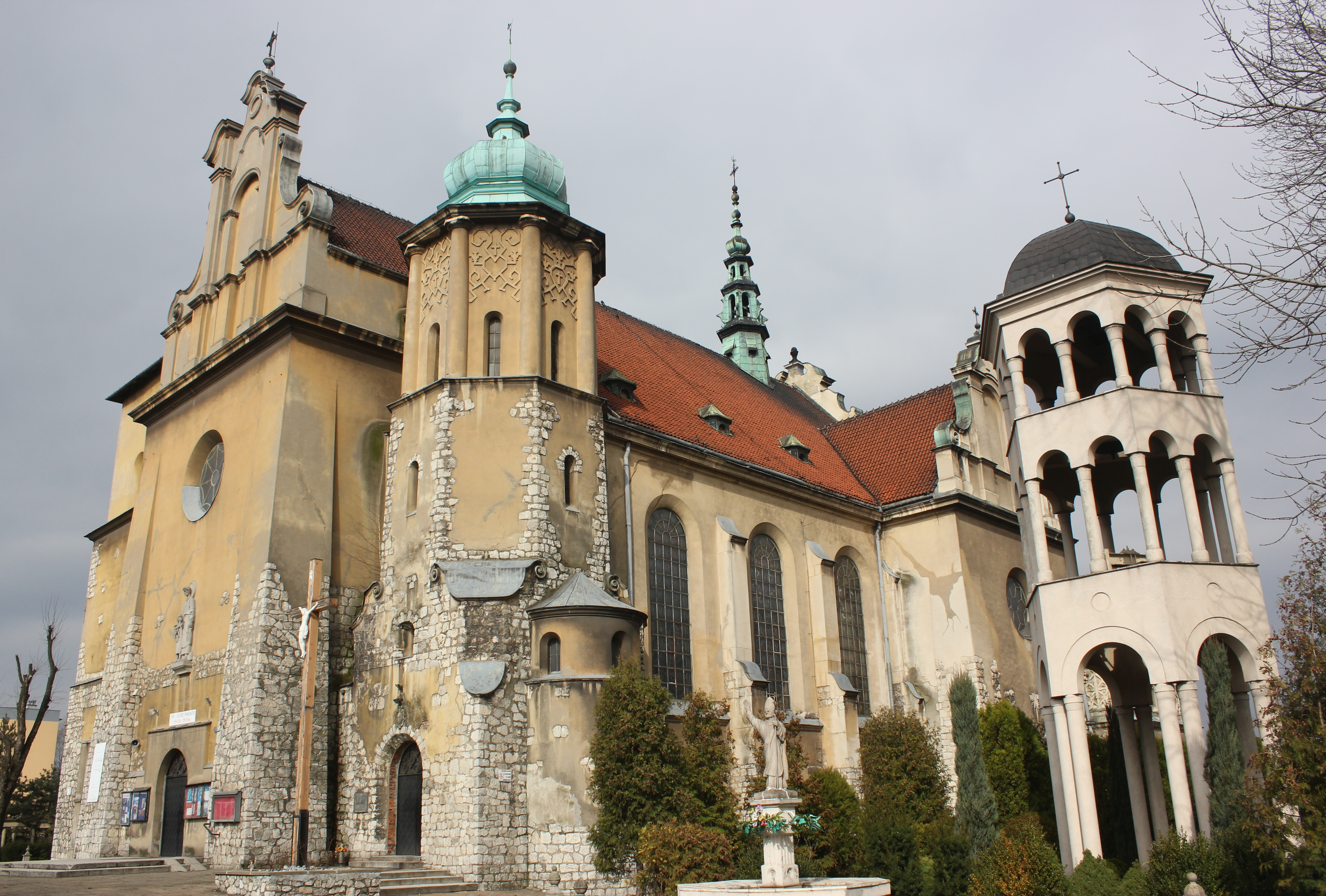
Saint Joseph church

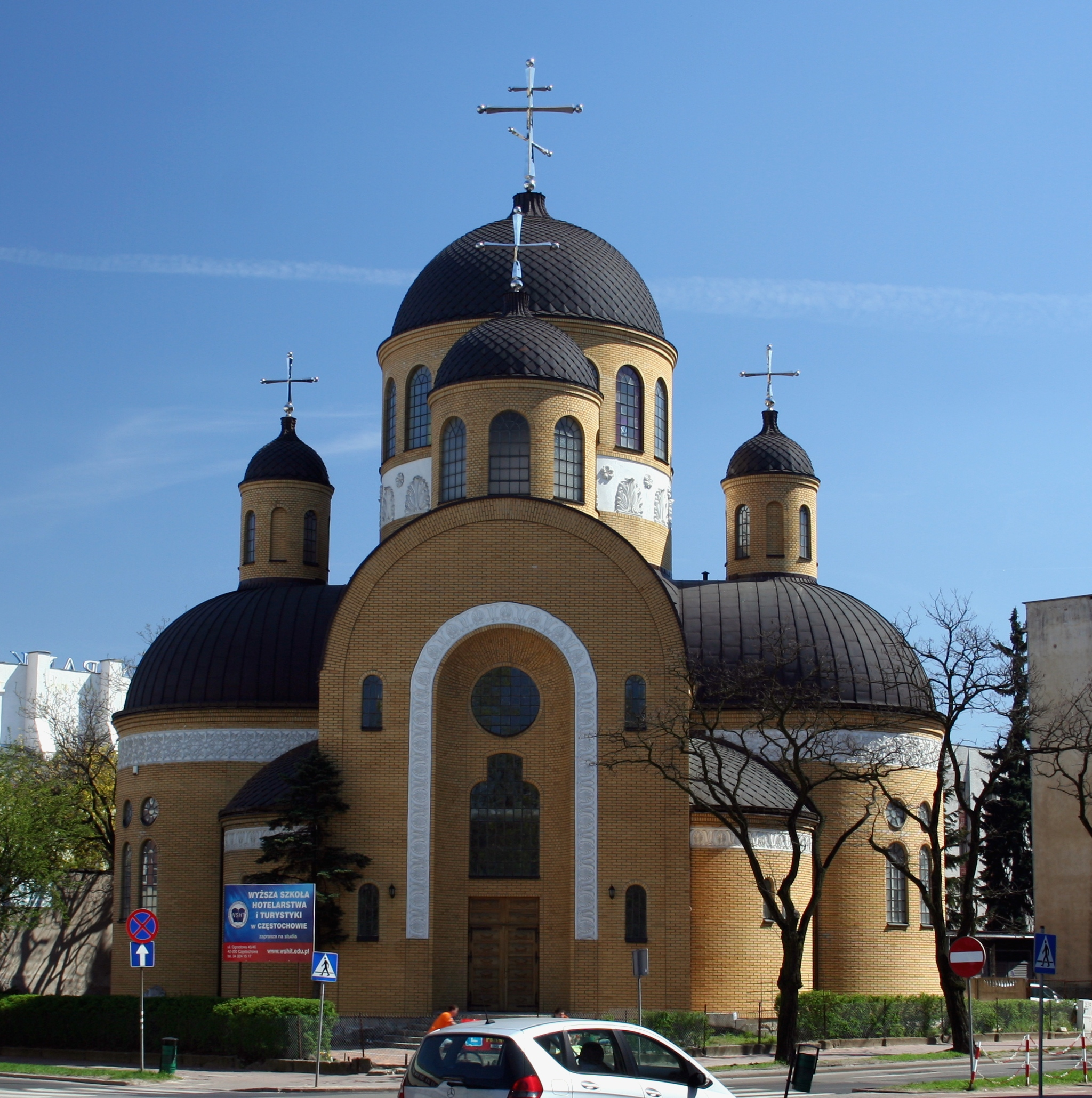
Orthodox Church of the Icon of Our Lady

In addition to the Roman Catholic Church and Polish Orthodox Church, various denominations are present in Częstochowa, including Evangelical Church of the Augsburg Confession in Poland, Baptist Union of Poland, Jehovah Witnesses, Pentecostal Church, Plymouth Brethren, Seventh-day Adventist Church, and Polish Catholic Church. Częstochowa is the Seat of the Roman Catholic Archdiocese of Częstochowa, as well as Holy Family Archdiocese Cathedral in Częstochowa, and the Jasna Góra Monastery along with 50 Catholic Parish Churches.

== Notable people ==
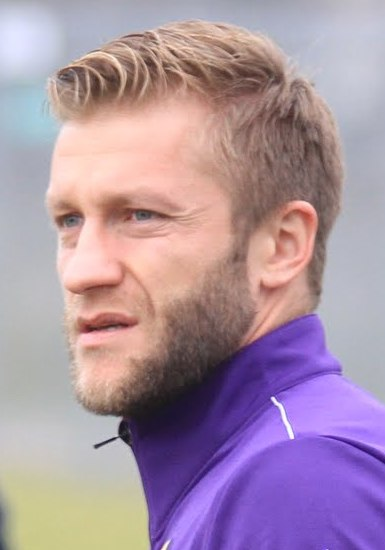
Jakub Błaszczykowski

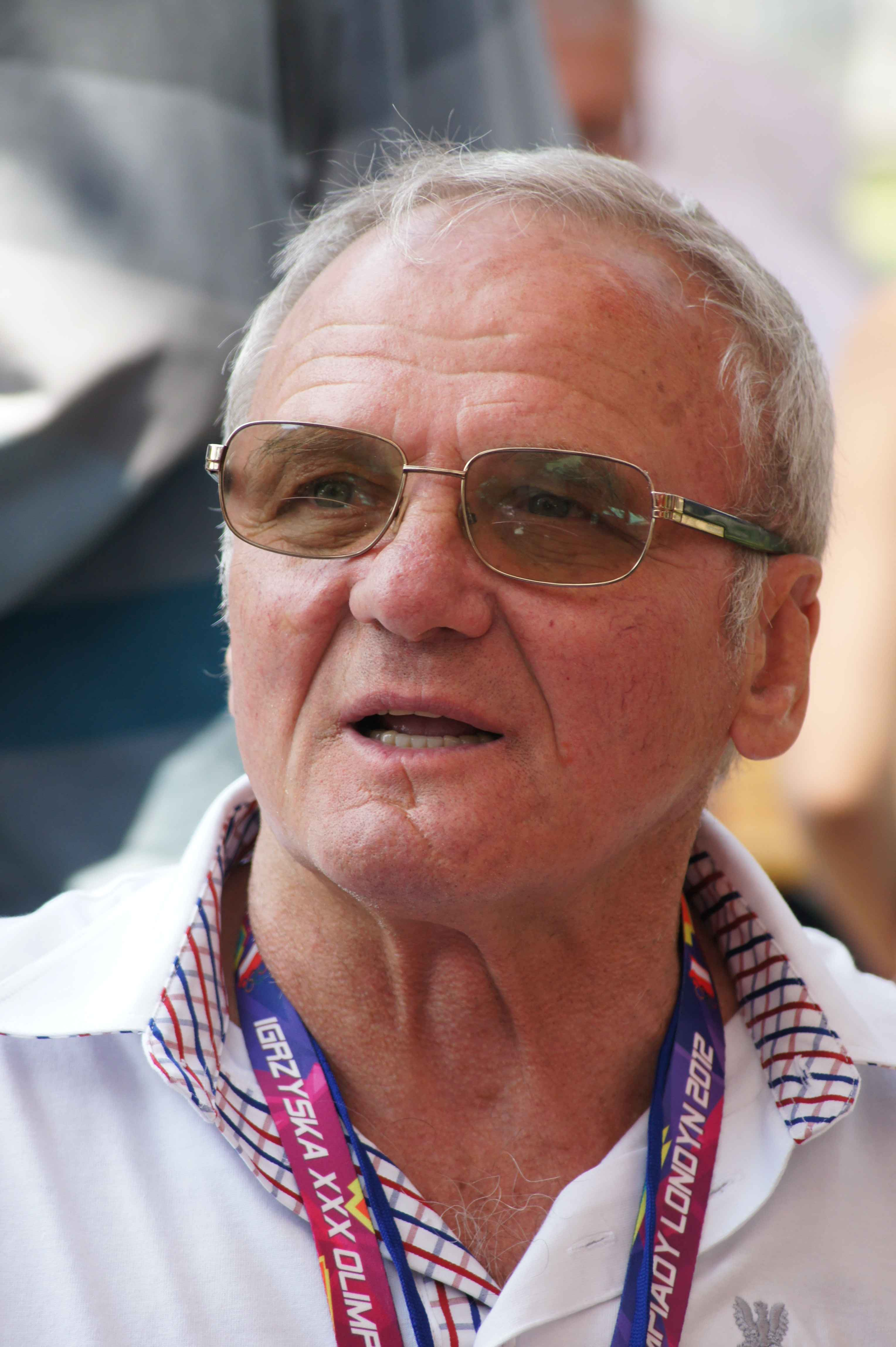
Jerzy Kulej

- Urszula Antoniak (born 1968), Polish-Dutch film director
- Julia Banaś (born 1997), model
- Stefan Bergman (1895–1977), Polish-American mathematician
- Avraham Bomba (1913-2000), Holocaust survivor and witness, Treblinka sonderkommando
- Władysław Biegański (1857–1917), medical doctor, philosopher and social activist
- Jakub Błaszczykowski (born 1985), footballer
- Krzysztof Boruń (1923–2000), Polish physicist, journalist and science fiction writer
- Millie Chissick (c. 1881–1975), Yiddish theatre actress
- Jerzy Duda-Gracz (1941–2004), painter
- Joseph S. Fruton (1912–2007), Polish-American biochemist and historian of science
- Bronisław Huberman (1882–1947), Polish-Jewish classical violinist and founder of the Palestine Philharmonic Orchestra, now Israel Philharmonic Orchestra
- Alexander Imich (1903–2014), Polish-American chemist
- Janusz Iwański (born 1956), jazz and rock guitarist, composer, songwriter and vocalist
- Janusz Kochanowski (1940-2010), lawyer, Polish Ombudsman for Citizen's Rights
- Marion Kozak (born 1934), Polish-born British activist, mother of British politicians David Miliband and Ed Miliband
- Jerzy Kulej (1940–2012), boxer and politician
- Tomasz Jaskóła (born 1974), Polish politician
- Kalina Jędrusik (1930–1991), singer and actress
- Pinchas Menachem Justman (1848–1920), Jewish Hasidic Rabbi
- Kazimierz Łaski (1921–2015), Polish-Austrian economist
- Agnes Milowka (1981–2011), Australian technical diver, underwater photographer, author, maritime archaeologist and cave explorer
- Samuel Willenberg (1923–2016), Polish-Jewish Treblinka survivor who participated in the uprising
- Hershl Sperling (1927–1989), participant in the Treblinka revolt and escapee
- Polia Pillin (1909–1992) Polish-born American ceramist
- Ingrid Pitt (1937–2010), Polish-British actress, author, and writer
- Halina Poświatowska (1935–1967), poet and writer
- Zygmunt Staszczyk (born 1963), singer
- Adam Szostkiewicz (born 1952), author and political commentator
- Dawid Celt (born 1985), tennis coach
- Sigmund Rolat (1930-2024), philanthropist, art collector, and businessman

== International relations ==
=== Consulates ===
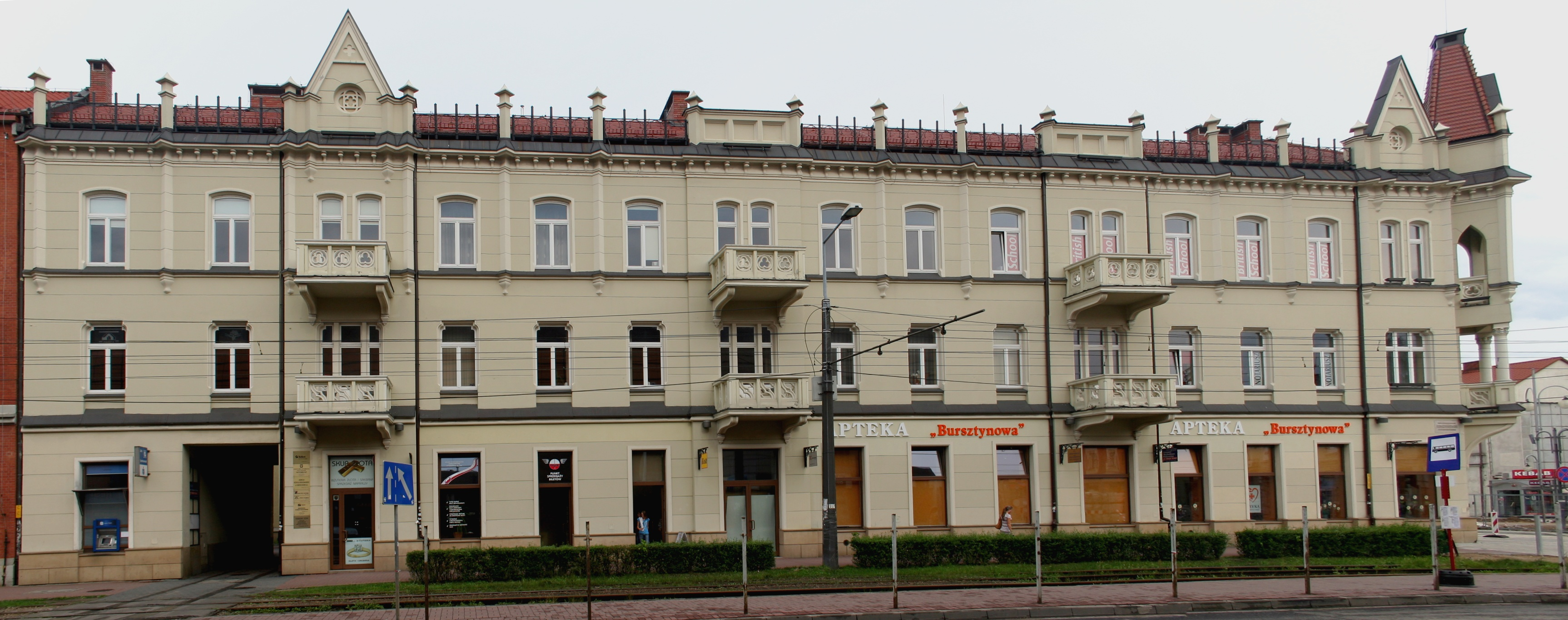
Building hosting the Honorary Consulate of the Czech Republic

There is an Honorary Consulate of the Czech Republic in Częstochowa.

=== Twin towns ===
Częstochowa is twinned with:

- Bethlehem, Palestine
- Irkutsk, Russia
- Kamianets-Podilskyi, Ukraine
- Trieste, Italy
- Reims, France
- Nazareth, Israel
- Ourém, Portugal
- Pforzheim, Germany
- Rēzekne, Latvia
- Šiauliai, Lithuania
- South Bend, United States
- Styria, Austria
- Zapopan, Mexico
