= Mayor of Częstochowa =

City mayor of Częstochowa
- Coat of arms of Częstochowa
- Incumbent; Krzysztof Matyjaszczyk since 10 December 2010
- Inaugural holder: Józef Gąsiorowski
- Formation: 1826

The city mayor of Częstochowa (the title in Polish is "prezydent miasta Częstochowy", literal translation "President of Częstochowa") is the head of the executive of Częstochowa. The mayor is elected for a 5-year term in the local elections.

== Current mayor ==
The current mayor is Krzysztof Matyjaszczyk (Democratic Left Alliance), who took office on 10 December 2010.

== Overview ==
Legislative and local executive powers are exercised by the city council (rada miasta), the directly elected mayor (prezydent), and the city offices (urząd miasta).

Since 1990 to 2002 the President of Częstochowa had been elected by the city council.

Since 2002 the President of Częstochowa is elected by all of the citizens of Częstochowa.

=== 1st election, 2002 ===
2002 Election (second round)
Independent	Tadeusz Wrona	33 571	58,41%	Steady
SLD-UP	Zdzisław Wolski	23 908	41,59%	Steady
Party	Candidate	Votes	%	±%

=== 2nd election, 2006 ===
2006 Election (second round)
Independent	Tadeusz Wrona	30695	60,77%	▲
PO	Halina Rozpondek	19 816	39,23%	Steady
Party	Candidate	Votes	%	±%

=== 3rd election, 2010 ===
2006 Election (second round)
SLD	Krzysztof Matyjaszczyk	33 696	70,89%	▲
PO	Izabela Leszczyna	13 840	29,11%	▼
Party	Candidate	Votes	%	±%

=== 4th election, 2014 ===
2014 Election (second round)
SLD	Krzysztof Matyjaszczyk	38 217	56,72%	▼
PiS	Artur Warzocha	29 162	43,28%	▲
Party	Candidate	Votes	%	±%

=== 5th election, 2018 ===
2018 Election (first round)
SLD	Krzysztof Matyjaszczyk	59 346	59,76%	▲
Party	Candidate	Votes	%	±%
PiS	Artur Warzocha	25 361	25,54%	▼
Independent	Marcin Maranda	6 130	6,17%	▼
Kukiz'15	Tomasz Jaskóła	5 235	5,27%	
PO	Jacek Krawczyk	2 814	2,83%	▼
Razem	Martin Saczek	427	0,43%	

== See also ==
- History of Częstochowa
- Częstochowa City Council
