= List of Marshals of Silesian Voivodeship =

This is a list of the Voivodeship Marshals of Silesia (Polish: marszałek województwa śląskiego) since the creation of the position in 1999. The Voivodeship Marshal of Silesia is the head of the provincial government and is the chief of the executive board. The marshal is appointed by the Silesian Regional Assembly and relies on its confidence for the duration of his or her term of office.

#	Picture	Name	From	Until	Political Party
1		Jan Olbrycht (1952-)	1 January 1999	26 November 2002	Solidarity Electoral Action
2		Michał Czarski (1949-)	26 November 2002	27 November 2006	Democratic Left Alliance
3		Janusz Moszyński (1956-)	27 November 2006	9 January 2008	Civic Platform
4		Bogusław Śmigielski (1958-)	12 January 2008	2 December 2010	Civic Platform
5		Adam Matusiewicz (1973-)	2 December 2010	21 January 2013	Civic Platform
6		Mirosław Sekuła (1955-)	21 January 2013	1 December 2014	Civic Platform
7		Wojciech Saługa (1969-)	1 December 2014	22 November 2018	Civic Platform
8		Jakub Chełstowski (1981-)	22 November 2018	7 May 2024	Law and Justice\Yes! For Poland
(7.)		Wojciech Saługa (1969-)	7 May 2024	Present	Civic Platform

== See also ==
- Voivodeship marshal
- Silesian Voivodeship
- Silesian Regional Assembly
