= Wiesław Maras =

Polish politician (born 1950)

Mayor of Częstochowa
- In office 2000–2002
- Preceded by: Ewa Janik
- Succeeded by: Tadeusz Wrona

Personal details
- Born: 28 January 1950 (age 76) Częstochowa
- Party: Democratic Left Alliance

Wiesław Maras (born 28 January 1950, in Wrocław) is a Polish politician, engineer and local official, and Mayor of Częstochowa (2000-2002).

== Biography ==
In 2000, after the resignation of Ewa Janik, the city council appointed him to the office of the Mayor of Częstochowa. In the direct local elections in 2002, the Democratic Left Alliance nominated Zdzisław Wolski as mayor candidate. On the other hand, Wiesław Maras obtained the mandate of the councilor of the Silesian Regional Assembly from SLD, after which he was appointed to the Silesian Voivodeship board. He was responsible for communication and transport, environmental protection and investments. He held this seat for a full four-year term. In 2006 and 2010 he got a re-election as a councilor. Maras did not run for the next election in 2014.
