= Marcin Maranda =

Polish politician

Marcin Maranda (born August 21, 1977 in Częstochowa) is a Polish politician, local official, social activist.

== Biography ==
He graduated from the Faculty of History at the Jan Długosz University.

In 2006, he joined the local center-right social initiative ''The Local Government Community of Tadeusz Wrona''. In the local elections in 2006 and 2010 he was elected a councilor of Częstochowa City Council from the list of this association. Then he left it and created in 2014 his own association ''Residents of Częstochowa''. His association won 13.69% and 4 seats in the local government elections in 2014 to the Częstochowa City Council. Maranda won the councilor's mandate and in the elections for the President of Częstochowa he reached the result of 15.62% of the votes, taking third place after Krzysztof Matyjaszczyk and Artur Warzocha. He became the vice-chairman of Częstochowa City Council, entering into a coalition with PO and SLD. In 2015, he started to the Senate from the Częstochowa district, winning 15.18% of the vote and taking third place after Arthur Warzocha and Andrzej Szewiński. In the local elections in 2018, his association suffered defeat in the elections to the Częstochowa City Council, gaining 7.67% and no mandate. Maranda again took third place in the elections for the President of Czestochowa, but with a worse result - 6.17% of votes.

He is the leader of the ''Local Association''.
