= Wojciech Konieczny =

Polish politician (born 1970)

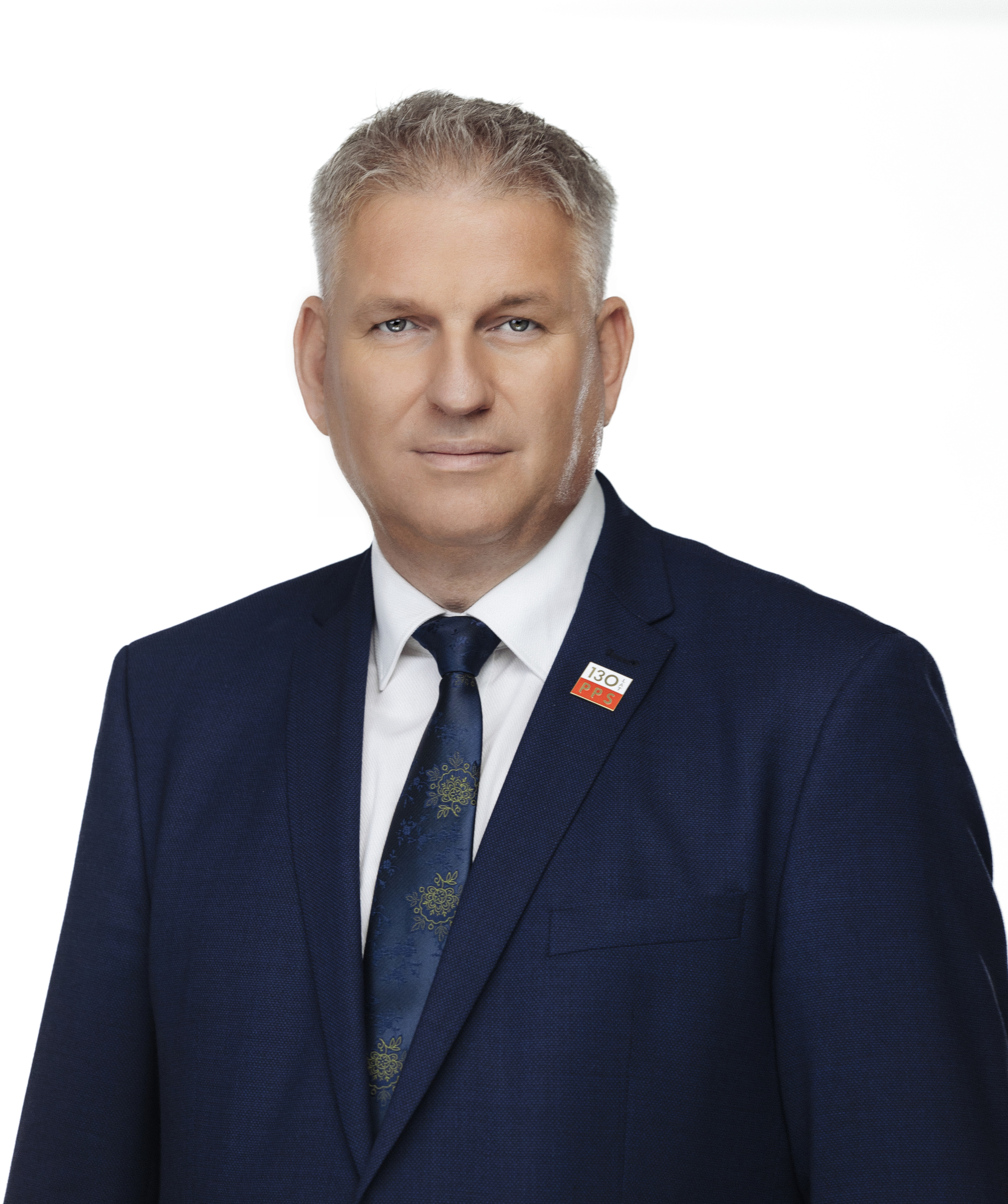

Member of the Senate
- Incumbent
- Assumed office 12 November 2019
- Preceded by: Artur Warzocha
- Parliamentary group: The Left
- Constituency: 69 (Częstochowa)

Chairman of Polish Socialist Party
- Incumbent
- Assumed office 16 March 2019
- Preceded by: Bogusław Gorski

Personal details
- Born: 30 September 1970 (age 55) Częstochowa, Poland
- Party: Polish Socialist Party
- Other political affiliations: The Left (2019–2021, since 2023)

Wojciech Jan Konieczny (born 30 September 1970) is a Polish physician and politician, member of the Senate since 2019.

== Political activity ==
He graduated from the Medical University of Silesia in Zabrze. In 2001 he won the Polish championship in basketball of doctors. In 1997 he started working at the Municipal Hospital in Częstochowa. In 2013 he became the director of this institution.

From the committees associated with the SLD, he ran unsuccessfully: in 2006 to the Częstochowa City Council, in 2007 and 2015 to the Sejm, in 2011 to the Senate, and in 2010, 2014 and 2018 to the Silesian Regional Assembly.

After the elections to the European Parliament in 2019, he assumed the seat in the Silesian Regional Assembly, replacing Marek Balt in the regional council, who became an MEP. In the parliamentary elections in 2019, he was a candidate for the Senate of the Republic of Poland from the Democratic Left Alliance (with the support of the Civic Coalition and the Polish People's Party) from Częstochowa. He obtained the mandate of the 10th term Senate, obtaining 49,261 votes (he defeated Artur Warzocha, who was seeking re-election from the Law and Justice). He was also elected to the 11th term.
