= Zdzisław Wolski =

Polish politician

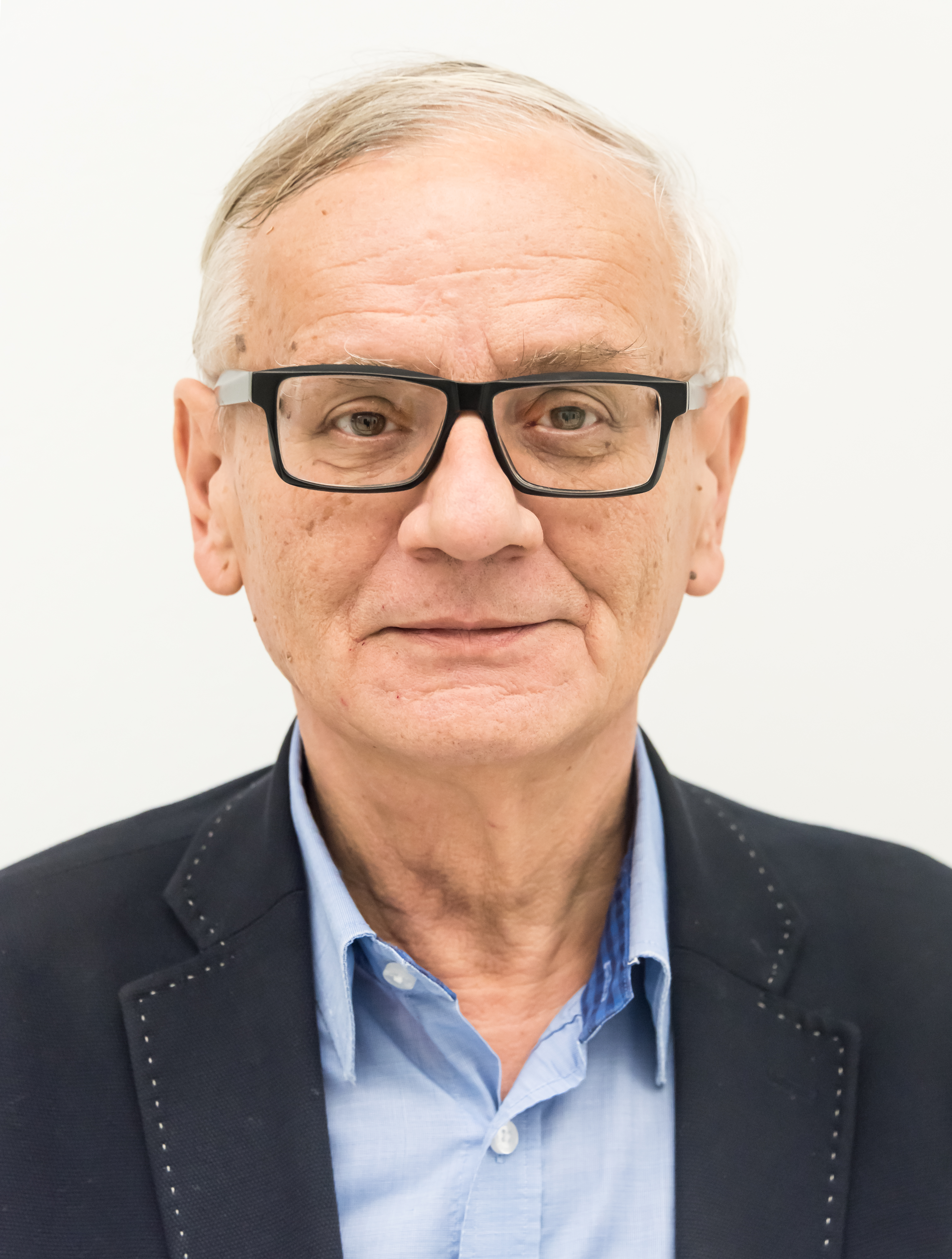
- Zdzisław Wolski in 2023

Member of the Sejm
- In office 12 November 2019 – 12 November 2023
- Constituency: 28 – Częstochowa

Personal details
- Born: 25 February 1956 (age 70) Szczawno-Zdrój
- Party: Democratic Left Alliance
- Education: Medical University of Silesia
- Occupation: Doctor, local official, politician

Zdzisław Wolski (born February 25, 1956, in Szczawno-Zdrój) is a doctor and politician, councilor of Częstochowa (1994–2019) and chairman of its city council (2011–2019), member of the 9th term Sejm of the Republic of Poland (2019–2023).

== Biography ==
He graduated from the Medical University of Silesia. In 1987–1991 he was the head of the health and social care department at the Częstochowa city hall. He became a doctor at one of the clinics in Częstochowa, as well as the owner of a construction company.

In 2002 he ran for Mayor of Częstochowa from the SLD-UP list, but he lost in the second round with Tadeusz Wrona, reaching 41.59%

Associated with the Democratic Left Alliance, Wolski was a Częstochowa city councilor for many terms (1994–2019). From 2011 to 2019 he was the chairman of the Częstochowa City Council. In addition, for many years he was the chairman of the SLD council club in Częstochowa.

In 2015, he unsuccessfully ran for the Sejm from the United Left list. In the elections in 2019, he was elected a deputy to the Sejm from the Częstochowa, from the SLD list (he won 18,527 votes).
