= Mirosław Sekuła =

Polish chemist and politician

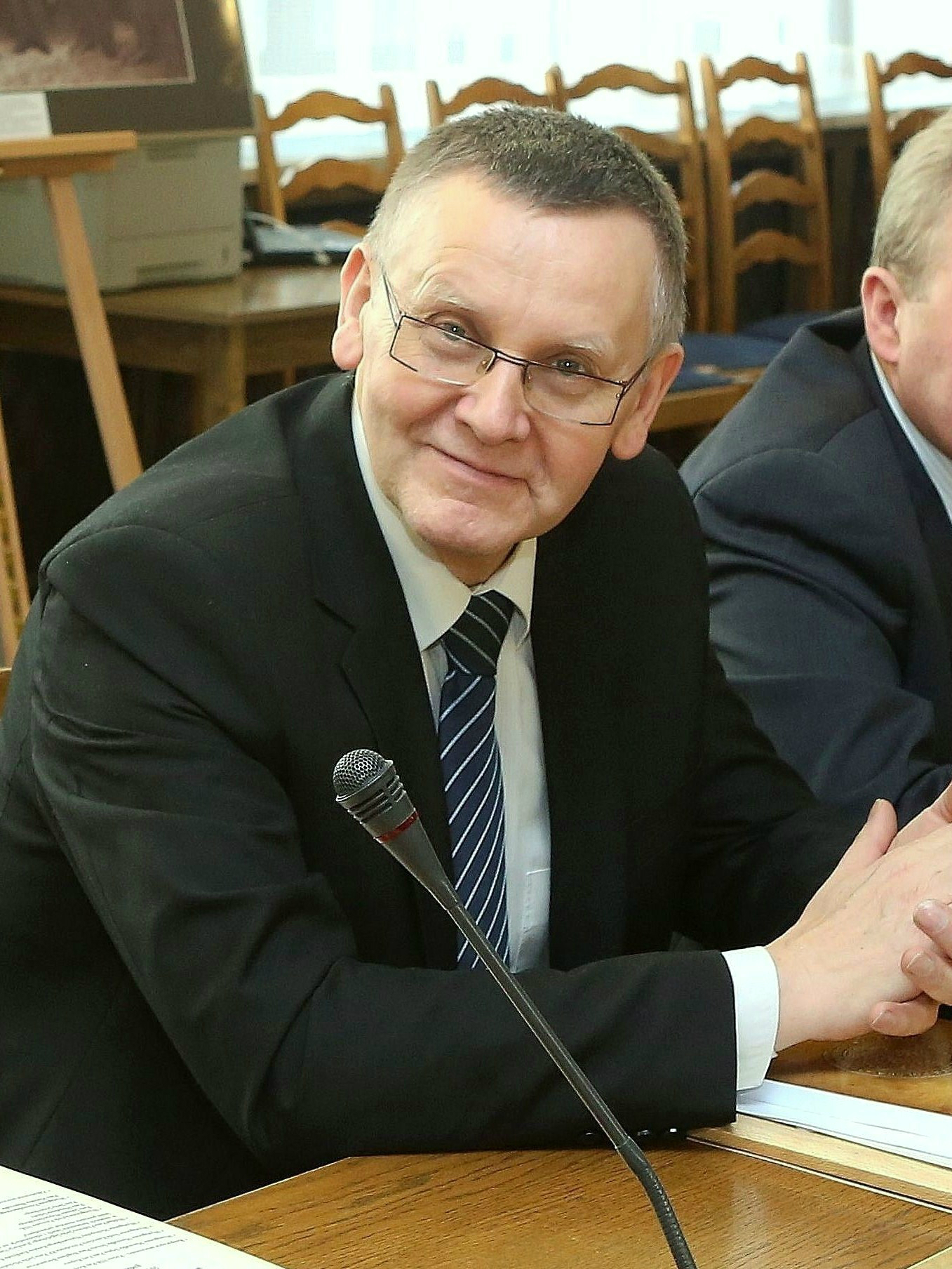

6th Marshal of Silesian Voivodeship
- In office 21 January 2013 – 1 December 2014
- Preceded by: Adam Matusiewicz
- Succeeded by: Wojciech Saługa

President of the Supreme Audit Office
- In office 20 July 2001 – 22 August 2007

Member of the Sejm
- In office 20 October 1997 – 20 July 2001
- Constituency: 16 - Katowice
- In office 5 November 2007 – 7 November 2011
- Constituency: 29 - Gliwice

Personal details
- Born: 20 June 1955 (age 71) Strzelce Opolskie, Poland
- Party: Solidarity Electoral Action (1997-2001); Civic Platform (2002-)
- Education: Silesian University of Technology
- Profession: Chemist

Mirosław Sekuła (born 20 June 1955, in Strzelce Opolskie) is a Polish chemist and politician. A member of the Sejm between 1997 and 2001 and again between 2007 and 2011, Sekuła also served as President of the Supreme Audit Office between 2001 and 2007, as Undersecretary of State at the Ministry of Finance between 2011 and 2013, and as the sixth Marshal of Silesian Voivodeship between 2013 and 2014.

== Early career ==
Sekuła graduated from the Silesian University of Technology in 1979, where he also undertook postgraduate studies at the university's Faculty of Organization and Management. Following his graduation, Sekuła was employed between 1980 and 1994 at the Institute for Chemical Processing of Coal in Zabrze, working as a manager of the institution as well as serving on its scientific council. Following the transition to democracy, Sekuła was elected to the Zabrze City Council in 1990, and between 1994 and 1998, was elected as deputy mayor of the city. He was elected to the Sejm during the 1997 parliamentary election as a member of Solidarity Electoral Action, representing the Katowice constituency. While in parliament, he acted as the chairman of the Public Finance Committee and vice-chairman of the Committee on Local Government and Regional Policy.

== Sejm ==
In 2001, Sekuła was appointed as president of the Supreme Audit Office by the Solidarity Electoral Action and Freedom Union majority in the Sejm. He presided over the office until 2007, when he was again reelected to parliament, now as a Civic Platform candidate. In 2009, Sekuła was confirmed as a member of the Sejm's special committee on investigating accusations of illicit lobbying connections between the gambling industry and members of the cabinet under Prime Minister Donald Tusk. Sekuła gained controversial notoriety after declaring in 2010 there was no evidence of illegal lobbying from cabinet officials, prompting members of the opposition also serving in the same committee to declare Sekuła's final report as a "corpse which the Law and Justice and the Democratic Left Alliance MPs tried to resuscitate with amendments." The SLD's Bartosz Arłukowicz heavily criticized the report prepared by Sekuła in parliament, saying, "I get the impression that you’re behaving like Howard Webb, you see fouls that aren’t there, goals that aren’t there and ignore the ones that are."

== Marshal of Silesia ==
Sekuła was appointed by the government as the Undersecretary of State for Finances in 2011. In 2013, he was elected as the sixth Marshal of Silesian Voivodeship by the Silesian Regional Assembly, replacing embattled Marshal Adam Matusiewicz. Following the election of Sekuła, the Silesian Autonomy Movement pulled out of the Civic Platform and Polish People's Party coalition in the executive board after the dismissal of its representative. As marshal, Sekuła successfully advocated the Polish Football Association to choose Silesian Stadium as a candidate for the UEFA Euro 2020 championship. Sekuła also supported finishing construction efforts for the new Silesian Museum in Katowice. During his marshalship, Sekuła was commonly found commenting on the neatness of dress and organization of provincial government officials, prompting pro-cycling groups to accuse the marshal of not approving bureaucrats commuting to work by bicycle. Sekuła also was an advocate for protecting children from the effects of the War in Donbas in eastern Ukraine, noting the strong connections Silesians had with the Donbas region.

In September 2014, Sekuła announced his resignation as marshal prior to that year's local elections. He was replaced by Wojciech Saługa.

== See also ==
- Members of Polish Sejm 2007-2011
