= Szewiński =

Szewiński (feminine: Szewińska) is a Polish surname. Notable people with the surname include:

- Andrzej Szewiński (born 1970), Polish volleyball player
- Irena Szewińska (1946–2018), Polish sprinter

== See also ==
- Ševínský, a Czech surname
