= Senate Constituency no. 69 =

Senate constituency in Poland

Senate Constituency no. 69 Częstochowa
- Okręg wyborczy nr 69
- Constituency for the Senate of Poland
- Location within Poland.
- City county: Częstochowa
- Voivodeship: Silesian
- Population: 208,282 (1 January 2023)
- Electorate: 160,015 (2023)
- Area: 159.72 km^{2} (61.67 sq mi)

Current constituency
- Created: 2011
- Party: PPS (The Left)
- Senator: Wojciech Konieczny
- Sejm constituency: 28 (Częstochowa)
- EP constituency: Silesian

Senate Constituency no. 69 (Polish: Okręg wyborczy nr 69 do Senatu) is a single-member constituency for the Senate of Poland in Silesian Voivodeship, consisting of city county of Częstochowa. Incumbent senator is Wojciech Konieczny, member of the Polish Socialist Party. He was elected at the 2023 parliamentary election as The Left alliance candidate and seats in the Senate as its parliamentary group member.

== Senators ==
Election	Senator	Party
2011	Andrzej Szewiński	PO
2015	Artur Warzocha	PiS
2019	Wojciech Konieczny	PPS
2023	Wojciech Konieczny	PPS

== Elections ==
=== 2011 ===
2011 parliamentary election: Częstochowa
Candidate	Party	Votes	%
Andrzej Szewiński	Civic Platform	37,471	37.12
Artur Warzocha	Law and Justice	20,799	20.60
Konrad Głębocki	Voters' Electoral Committee	12,264	12.15
Danuta Marzec	Democratic Left Alliance	12,207	12.09
Marek Drygas	Voters' Electoral Committee	10,024	9.93
Stefan Kramarski	New Right of Janusz Korwin-Mikke	4,325	4.28
Cezary Graj	Citizens for the Senate–Union of Mayors	3,862	3.83
Total		100,952	100.00
Valid votes		100,952	97.55
Invalid/blank votes		2,531	2.45
Total votes		103,483	100.00
Registered voters/turnout		193,215	53.56
Source: National Electoral Commission

=== 2015 ===
2015 parliamentary election: Częstochowa
Candidate	Party	Votes	%	+/–
Artur Warzocha	Law and Justice	34,969	35.18	+14.58
Andrzej Szewiński	Civic Platform	29,755	29.94	−7.18
Marcin Maranda	Voters' Electoral Committee	15,087	15.18	New
Jarosław Marszałek	United Left	13,412	13.49	+1.40 (Note: Compared with the Democratic Left Alliance candidate's result.)
Tomasz Bebłociński	JOW Bezpartyjni	6,168	6.21	New
Total		99,391	100.00	–
Valid votes		99,391	97.94	
Invalid/blank votes		2,093	2.06	
Total votes		101,484	100.00	
Registered voters/turnout		184,337	55.05	+1.49
Source: National Electoral Commission

=== 2019 ===
2019 parliamentary election: Częstochowa
Candidate	Party	Votes	%	+/–
Wojciech Konieczny	The Left	49,261	43.75	+30.26 (Note: Compared with the United Left candidate's result.)
Artur Warzocha	Law and Justice	43,893	38.99	+3.81
Krzysztof Świerczyński	Bezpartyjni i Samorządowcy	19,433	17.26	New
Total		112,587	100.00	–
Valid votes		112,587	98.78	
Invalid/blank votes		1,387	1.22	
Total votes		113,974	100.00	
Registered voters/turnout		173,075	65.85	+10.8
Source: National Electoral Commission

=== 2023 ===
2023 parliamentary election: Częstochowa
Candidate	Party	Votes	%	+/–
Wojciech Konieczny	The Left	59,980	49.44	+5.69
Monika Pohorecka	Law and Justice	36,866	30.39	−8.60 (Note: Compared with the result of a different candidate from the same party.)
Marcin Maranda	Bezpartyjni Samorządowcy	13,055	10.76	−6.50
Małgorzata Bieńskowska	Confederation	11,406	9.40	New
Total		121,307	100.00	–
Valid votes		121,307	98.67	
Invalid/blank votes		1,629	1.33	
Total votes		122,936	100.00	
Registered voters/turnout		160,015	76.83	+10.98
Source: National Electoral Commission
