= Adam Matusiewicz =

Polish politician

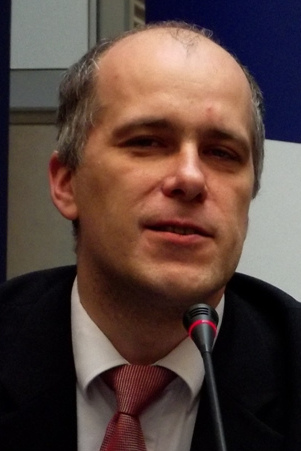

5th Marshal of Silesian Voivodeship
- In office 2 December 2010 – 21 January 2013
- Preceded by: Bogusław Śmigielski
- Succeeded by: Mirosław Sekuła

Personal details
- Born: 28 January 1973 (age 53) Katowice, Poland
- Party: Real Politics Union (1990-1995); Conservative People's Party (1997-2001); Civic Platform (2001-2013)
- Education: University of Economics in Katowice; Silesian University of Technology
- Profession: Accountant

Adam Matusiewicz (born 28 January 1973 in Katowice) is a Polish politician. Matusiewicz served as the fifth Marshal of Silesian Voivodeship from 2010 to 2013.

== Early career ==
Born and raised in Katowice, Matusiewicz studied accounting specialization at the University of Economics in Katowice. Between 1996 and 2000, Matusiewicz worked as a manager for the Silesian Union of Municipalities and Districts. While working as a member of the organization, Matusiewicz dismissed the politics of the Silesian Autonomy Movement, saying that ideas of Silesian autonomy were a minority opinion and "exist[ed] more in the mass media" than in reality. After this period, Matusiewicz worked as the town treasurer of Pszczyna from 2000 to 2007. In December 2007, Matusiewicz was appointed as the vice-voivode of the province, where he assisted the central government's activities in health care, the Ministry of Treasury's provincial assets, national road inspection, and education board supervision.

== Marshal of Silesia ==
In the 2010 local elections, Matusiewicz was elected as a member of Civic Platform to the Silesian Regional Assembly, representing the Katowice district. Matusiewicz sat as a member of the assembly's Rules Commission, and the International Cooperation and European Integration Commission.

Shortly after his election, Matusiewicz was chosen as the next Marshal of Silesia by the Civic Platform, Polish People's Party and Silesian Autonomy Movement parliamentary coalition. Upon his inauguration as the province's head of government, Matusiewicz declared his executive board would strongly prioritize ongoing provincial investments, including the expansion of Katowice International Airport, the construction of the Silesian Museum, upgrading voivodeship roads, cooperation with other provincial governments regarding regional transport, and the responsible appropriation of European Union funds. Under Matusiewicz's marshalship, economic ties with China were expanded.

Under Matusiewicz, the provincially-owned Silesian Railways began service in October 2011, with the marshal promising adequate and on time rail service between Katowice, Częstochowa, Sosnowiec and Wisła Głębce, with further expansions promised afterwards. The enlargement of Silesian Railways was part of Matusiewicz's plans to gradually replace national regional carrier Polregio with the province's own carrier by 2012.

Matusiewicz's marshalship underwent a massive political and popular backlash following the completion of Silesian Railways' takeover of the rest of Polregio's services in Silesia on 9 December 2012. Bad weather, poor organization, and multiple technical malfunctions with the provincial railway fleet facilitated a weeklong massive rail transport delay across the voivodeship, severely disrupting the new service's timetable, and forcing the intervention of Polregio and bus services to assist stranded passengers. As marshal, Matusiewicz assumed responsibility for the crisis, and offered his resignation to the assembly on 20 December, stating, "I prefer to leave with honor than to go down in history as part of a gallery of cowards afraid to make important decisions." The assembly accepted his resignation 38-1. Despite the crisis and the problematic beginning of the provincial-wide rail service, Matusiewicz stressed in January 2013 that he remained proud of its creation and expressed confidence in its future.

Following his resignation, Matusiewicz was replaced by former Sejm representative and ex-president of the Supreme Audit Office Mirosław Sekuła.

== Post-political career ==
In the aftermath of the railway crisis, it was revealed that Matusiewicz had been hired by Siemianowice Śląskie-based water company Aqua-Sprint as a director shortly after his resignation. In September 2013, Matusiewicz was ejected from Civic Platform, citing the damaged image his marshalship had given the party in Silesia.

Political offices
Preceded by Bogusław Śmigielski	Marshal of Silesia; 2010 – 2013	Succeeded by Mirosław Sekuła
