= Stanisław Gmitruk =

Polish politician

Chairperson of the Silesian Regional Assembly
- In office January 16, 2017 – November 21, 2018
- Preceded by: Grzegorz Wolnik
- Succeeded by: Jan Kawulok

Personal details
- Born: 23 October 1955 (age 70) Częstochowa
- Party: Polish People's Party
- Education: Warsaw University of Life Sciences
- Occupation: economist, manager, agricultural official, politician

Stanisław Gmitruk (born October 23, 1955, in Łosice) is a Polish politician, economist, manager and agricultural official.

== Biography ==
He graduated in economics at the Warsaw University of Life Sciences. He is a member of Polish People's Party (PSL). From 1988 to 1990 and in 1992 he was an administrator of branch of the party in Częstochowa. From 1998 to 2002 and from 2006 to 2010 he was a councilor in a Częstochowa City Council. Except that he was a councilor in Kiedrzyn Council, which he presided from 1995 to 1999 and from 2003 to 2006.

In 2014 local elections he successfully applied for the seat in the Silesian Regional Assembly, taking the position of the vice-chairperson of this body. On January 16, 2017, he became chairman of the regional council in the place of Grzegorz Wolnik. In the elections in 2018 he was re-elected. On November 21, 2018, he finished to execute the function of chairman of the regional council.
