= Krzysztof Matyjaszczyk =

Polish politician (born 1974)

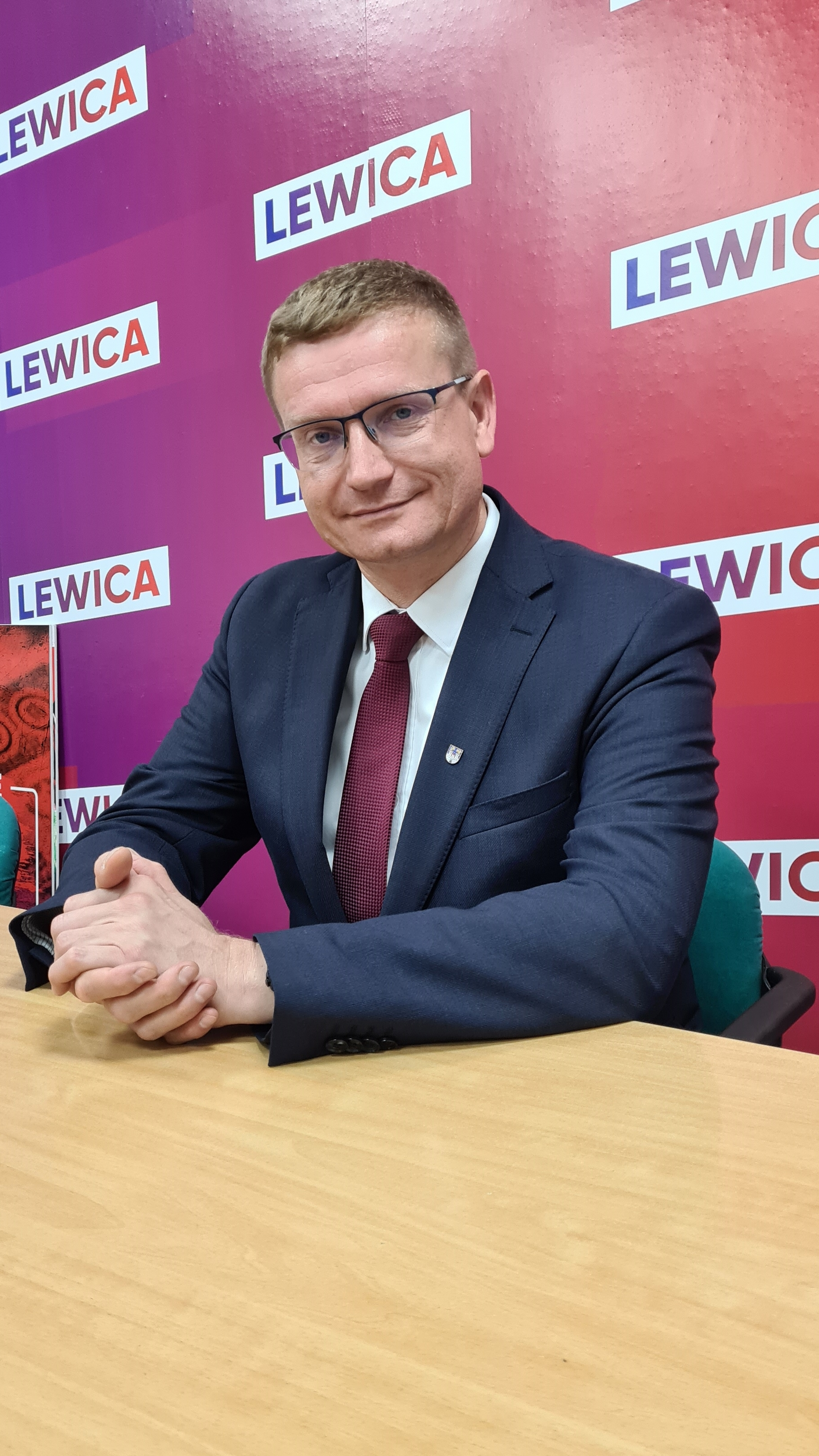

City mayor of Częstochowa
- In office 10 December 2010 – 25 October 2026
- Preceded by: Piotr Kurpios (Acting)

Personal details
- Born: 27 May 1974 (age 52) Radomsko, Poland
- Party: Democratic Left Alliance (until 2021); New Left (since 2021)
- Other political affiliations: The Left (since 2019)

Krzysztof Adam Matyjaszczyk (born 27 May 1974) is a Polish politician, member of the Polish Parliament (2007-2010), local official, since 2010 president of Częstochowa.

== Life and career ==
He graduated from construction and management at the Częstochowa University of Technology. He is a member of the Democratic Left Alliance. In the years 2002-2007 he was a member of the City Council of Częstochowa, serving as vice-chairman.

In the parliamentary election in 2005, from the list of SLD, he ran without success to the Sejm. In the local government elections in 2006 from LiD, he ran for the presidency of Czestochowa, taking 3rd place out of 6 candidates (obtained 14,683 votes, which was 20.83%).

In the parliamentary election in 2007, he was elected an MP, running from the LiD list in the Częstochowa constituency and receiving 16,432 votes.

In the local government elections in 2010, he started again as a SLD candidate for the office of President of Częstochowa. In the first round, he obtained 35,045 (45.83%) votes. He moved to the second round with Izabela Leszczyna from the PO, who received 16 815 votes (21.99%). In the second round, he obtained a score of 33,696 (70.89%) of the votes against 13,840 (29.11%) of votes for his opponent. In the local government elections in 2014, he successfully applied for re-election, receiving in the second round 56.72% of the votes and defeating the PiS candidate - Artur Warzocha. In 2018 local elections he was elected for the next term in the first round, obtaining 59.76% of votes.

== Reforms and political views ==
Krzysztof Matyjaszczyk is a politician with liberal-leftist views, but against the background of his own party he is a politician with very moderate and centrist views. He is a proponent of ruling a city in a coalition with a Civic Coalition.

As Mayor, Matyjaszczyk introduced a funding program for in vitro fertilisation in Częstochowa. He supports recreation of the Częstochowa Voivodeship.
