= Yes! For Poland =

Yes! For Poland Local Governments for Poland Tak! Dla Polski Samorządy dla Polski
- Abbreviation: T!DPL
- Leader: Rafał Trzaskowski
- Founded: 31 August 2020
- Registered: 6 October 2020
- Headquarters: ul. Kartuska 81/6; 80-136 Gdańsk
- Membership (2021): 500
- Ideology: Regionalism; Localism; Decentralisation; Pro-Europeanism
- Political position: Centre-left
- National affiliation: Senate Pact 2023 (for 2023 Senate election)
- Colours: White; Red
- Sejm: 2 / 460
- Senate: 1 / 100
- European Parliament: 0 / 53
- Regional assemblies: 4 / 552
- City Presidents: 16 / 107

Website
- ruchtakdlapolski.pl

Yes! For Poland (Polish: Tak! Dla Polski [ˈtak ˈdla ˈpɔl.ski], T!DPL), officially called Association "Local Governments for Poland" (Polish: Stowarzyszenie „Samorządy dla Polski” ) is a Polish association and a local government movement founded on 31 August 2020 in Gdańsk. It is the largest association of local government activists in Poland. Founded by officials of over 300 local governments in Poland, the party advocates for decentralisation of power, democratisation of the Polish school system, environmentalism, renewal and decentralisation of the health service and creation of an expansive development fund for local and regional projects. T!DPL believes that a powerful local government is the foundation of sound democracy and declared that "only a Poland built from the bottom up, from the most basic foundation which is the gmina, will be a strong, independent, secure and democratic European country". The movement especially focuses on empowering and representing small gminas and villages, considered underrepresented under the current Polish system.

The party is heavily critical of the government led by Law and Justice, accusing it of undermining local governments, recentralisation of Poland and undermining institutions of Polish Democracy. T!DPL is heavily aligned with the opposition parties such as Civic Platform, Polish People's Party and The Left and maintained its intention to cooperate with these parties and to avoid vote splitting. In May 2022, the party announced formal cooperation with the main four opposition parties - Civic Platform, PSL, The Left and Poland 2050; the leaders of the four opposition parties signed a declaration prepared by the Yes! For Poland, pledging decentralisation and strengthening local autonomies, providing local governments with more funding and creating a special fund for small municipalities. The party joined the Senate Pact with these parties, and announced its 6 main goals which include "democratic schools", "green local governments", "decentralised healthcare", "Local Poland Development Fund", "self-governing communities" and "stable budgets".

== History ==
The association was founded on 31 August 2020 in Gdańsk, on the 40th anniversary of the signing of the August Agreements. It was entered into the register of associations on 6 October 2020 under the name "Self-Governments for Poland" Association. On 15 December 2021, a unification convention was held in Poznań, whose task was to merge seven local associations and elect a board. Jacek Karnowski, Mayor of Sopot, became the President of the Management Board.

In the 2021 party convention in Poznań, the movement declared a Local Government Movement Yes! For Poland as the name for the political party. The party was founded with the intention to consolidate the mayors of large cities, mayors and mayors in a decentralised and federalised political organisation. The movement included the leaders of seven local government organisations, including Dolny Śląsk - Wspólna Sprawa, Ruch Wspólna Polska, Tak! Samorządy dla Polski, Wielkopolska - Kierunek Europa and Ruch Obrony Polskiej Samorządności. These organisations were led by, among others, Rafał Trzaskowski, Jacek Sutryk, Jacek Jaskowiak, Adam Struzik or Jacek Karnowski. The new party attracted attention and was heavily commented upon by major parties such as the Civic Platform.

The convention also decided on the program of the new political party, creating a two-fold objective program that was divided into two parts - the consolidation around specific demands and issues on a national basis such as opposition to widespread centralisation, the introduction of Polski Ład, expanded financial budgets for local governments and education reform. The convention also announced its intention to cooperate with other political parties and consolidate a front against the United Right government, stressing that the opposition required "further elements" to strengthen its platform.

On November 21, 2022, the Marshal of the Silesian Voivodeship Sejmik, Jakub Chełstowski, joined the association together with three councilors of the sejmik, who created the club of the association "Yes! for Poland” in the Sejmik, which resulted in the loss of the Law and Justice majority in this body.

From the beginning of the movement, it has opposed the centralization of power led by Mateusz Morawiecki's government and the reduction of local government revenues. Dziennik Bałtycki compared Yes! For Poland to other centre-left and opposition-aligned parties and organisations.

The party joined the Civic Coalition in January 2023, with numerous members of the party running for Sejm and Senat from the electoral lists of the Civic Coalition and the Senate Pact 2023. Ultimately two members of the party entered the Sejm - the leader of the party Jacek Karnowski, and the Vice Mayor of Wałbrzych Sylwia Bielawska. The party's candidate for the Senate, Wadim Tyszkiewicz, also won his seat as an independent candidate of the Senate Pact 2023.

== Actions ==
According to "21 local government theses", the movement postulates, among others, the full right of the local government community to independently decide on all local matters, building a solidary and open local community and transforming the Senate of the Republic of Poland into a Local Government Chamber. The role of increasing the powers of local governments, cooperation between them, decentralization, support for the idea of civil society, development of education and construction, care for the environment is emphasized. From the beginning of the movement, he has opposed the centralization of power led by Mateusz Morawiecki's government and the reduction of local government income.

T!DP is involved in initiatives related to the interests of local authorities. A protest of local governments was also organized to "dramatically draw attention to the deteriorating financial situation of Polish local governments" by turning off the lights in selected public buildings. More than 40 entities took part in the action.

The organization is involved in lawmaking by preparing bills, e.g. a bill amending the act on the income of local government units. The achievement of the movement is the White Book, i.e. a set of recommendations and legal changes in connection with the arrival of over 3 million refugees from Ukraine to Poland. By issuing an appeal, the president of Wody Polskie, Przemysław Daca, was dismissed. The association's media publish positions on the controversies of public life, eg Print 886, the crisis of the judiciary, inflation.

On May 29, 2023, the movement and opposition parties discussed the local government program for Poland. The leaders of the groupings - Donald Tusk (PO), Szymon Hołownia (Poland 2050), Włodzimierz Czarzasty (NL) and Władysław Kosiniak-Kamysz (PSL) declared that their postulates would be implemented within a year of the possible takeover of power in Poland. The postulates concern the economic stability of the local government, its competences in matters of education, health protection and climate. On June 27, a public consultation on these proposals was launched.

== Program ==
The party wants to decentralise Poland and build a system based on subsidiarity that would greatly empower the smallest local, municipal and urban-rural governments. The party wants to increase the share of local governments at all levels in PIT revenues, ensuring transparency and active participation of social institutions such as and local governments in the distribution of public funds, and to introduce the possibility to deduct VAT when implementing local government investments. The party is also in favour of creating a Local Poland Development Fund, which would be allocated to small, rural municipalities in particular. Yes! For Poland is considered a part of the wider left-wing movement in Poland.

Other demands of the movement are related to increasing educational subsidies, providing local governments with freedom in the organisation of education, simplifying the core curriculum and providing more autonomy to teachers. "YES! For Poland" also wants to support local governments in energy production and combating smog, providing municipalities with a 50 per cent share of revenues from the sale of carbon dioxide emission allowances (to be used for investments in renewable energy sources).

In regards to healthcare, the 'YES! For Poland' proposes, among other things, transferring some competences, including financial ones, to regional governments. It also expects the role of the Joint Commission of Government and Self-Government to be strengthened in the legislative process, so that every bill concerning self-governments is agreed with them. The movement also proposes that counties and provinces be enshrined in the constitution and that the limitation on the number of terms of office for mayors be lifted.

According to the party program, the main goal of the organisation is "a democratic, law-abiding Poland, based on European values, including the principle of subsidiarity, respecting the dignity of every human being, caring for the environment and being an important link in the international community". The representatives of the party declared "active support for the idea of self-government in the Republic of Poland" and support for "the essence of local self-government, which is the decentralisation of public authority and self-governance flowing from the principle of subsidiarity - self-governance based on a clear distribution of tasks, stable and fair financing, predictability of the law and the rule of law".

At the party convention, the movement made a following declaration: "We want a Poland of self-government and solidarity, in which the people decide the fate of their local communities". The program of the party includes the following 21 points:

- The full right of the local community to decide on all local matters;
- Building a community of solidarity and openness, combating exclusion;
- Transformation of Polish Senate into a Chamber of Regions (representation of local governments);
- Abolition of mandatory term limits;
- Obligation to consult representatives of local authorities and the community on all draft laws;
- Increased investment in education, higher salaries for teachers;
- Regional culture development for local communities;
- Decentralisation of health services;
- Stricter environmental protection, combating smog;
- Landscape and public space protection'
- Development of communal and social housing;
- Self-governance in the field of local taxation and economic activity;
- Higher state funding adequate to the tasks carried out by local authorities;
- Decentralisation of the distribution of EU funds;
- Transfer of public property to local communities;
- Freedom to form metropolitan associations and functional areas;
- Abolition of the governor's office, leaving the central authority in charge of supervising the legality of the operation of local self-government entities;
- Authority of the district and provincial governments over combined services;
- Depoliticisation of public media;
- Municipal and local police forces;
- Restoration of the civil service.

== Election results ==
=== Sejm ===
Election year	Leader	# of votes	% of vote	# of overall seats won	+/–	Government
2023	Jacek Karnowski	6,629,402	30.7 (#2)	2 / 460	New	
2023	Jacek Karnowski	6,629,402	30.7 (#2)	2 / 460	New	PiS Minority (2023)
2023	Jacek Karnowski	6,629,402	30.7 (#2)	2 / 460	New	KO–PL2050–PSL–NL (2023-present)
2023	As part of Civic Coalition, which won 157 seats in total.					

=== Senate ===
Election year	Number of votes	Percentage of vote	Number of overall seats won	+/–	Majority
2023	6,187,295	28.91 (#2)	1 / 100	▲1	KO–PL2050–KP–NL–LR
2023	As part of the Senate Pact 2023, which won 65 seats.				
