= Wojciech Saługa =

Polish economist and politician

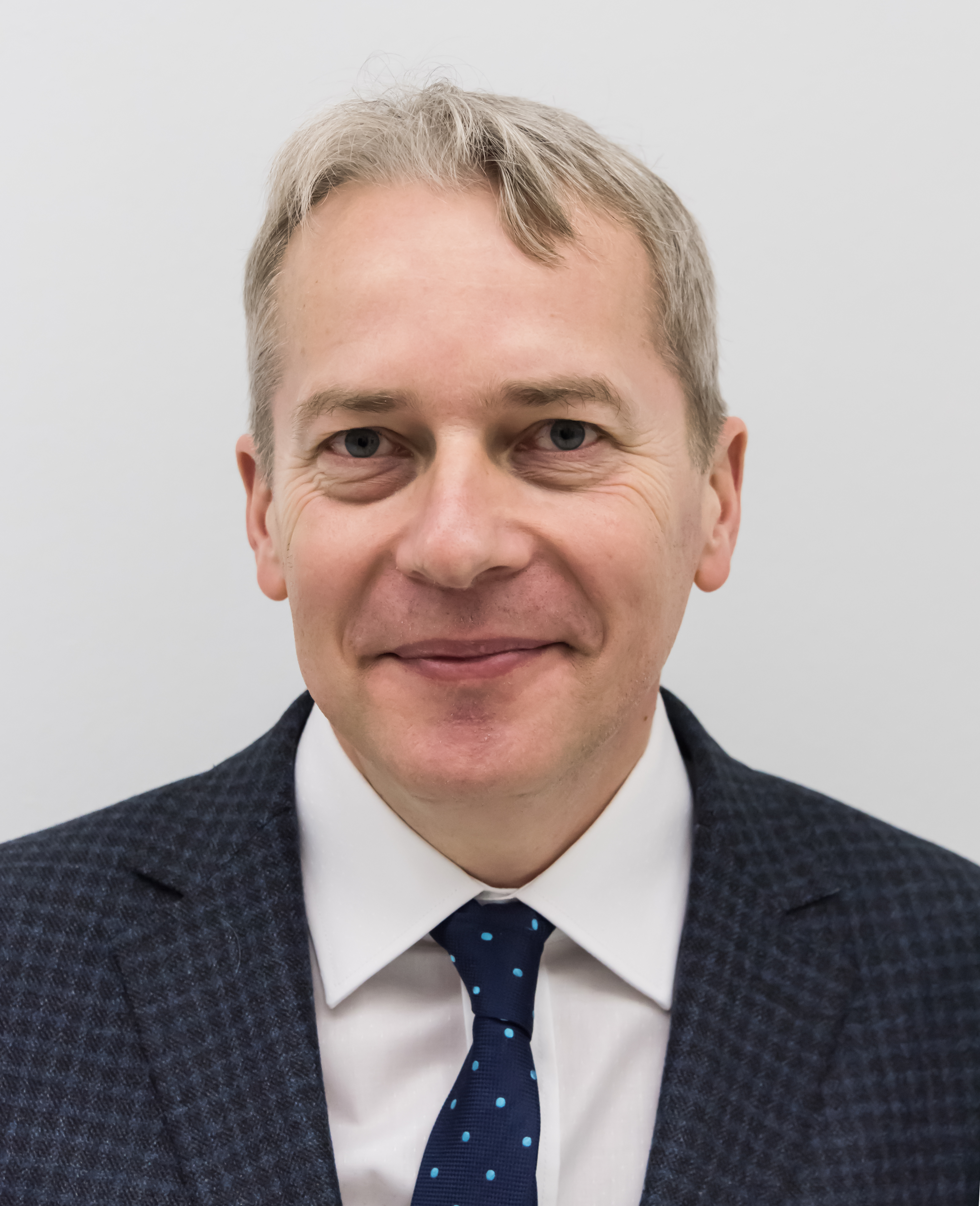

7th Marshal of Silesian Voivodeship
- Incumbent
- Assumed office 7 May 2024
- Preceded by: Jakub Chełstowski
- In office 1 December 2014 – 21 November 2018
- Preceded by: Mirosław Sekuła
- Succeeded by: Jakub Chełstowski

Member of the Sejm
- In office 12 November 2019 – 6 May 2024
- Constituency: 32 - Sosnowiec
- In office 25 September 2005 – 1 December 2014
- Constituency: 32 - Sosnowiec

Member of the Senate
- In office 29 September 2004 – 24 September 2005
- Constituency: 31 - Sosnowiec

Personal details
- Born: 27 March 1969 (age 57) Jaworzno, Poland
- Party: Real Politics Union (1994-1998); Conservative People's Party (1998-2002); Civic Platform (2002-)
- Education: Kraków University of Economics
- Profession: Economist

Wojciech Paweł Saługa (born 27 March 1969 in Jaworzno) is a Polish economist and politician. He is the current Marshal of Silesia.

A graduate of the Kraków University of Economics, Saługa worked at ING Bank Śląski between 1994 and 2002. At the same time, Saługa was involved in municipal politics, elected as an alderman to the Jaworzno City Council between 1998 and 2002, and later served as the town's deputy mayor between 2002 and 2004. He subsequently took a position in the Senate following a successful by-election in 2004 for Sosnowiec as a Civic Platform candidate. He was elected to the Sejm representing the Sosnowiec constituency in the 2005 parliamentary election, winning reelection again in 2007 and 2011. Saługa resigned from the Sejm in December 2014.

In December 2014, Saługa was elected as the seventh Marshal of Silesia by the Civic Platform, Polish People's Party and Democratic Left Alliance coalition within the Silesian Regional Assembly, becoming the chief executive of the province. As the head of the province's executive board, Saługa invited the Silesian Autonomy Movement to join the board's coalition in June 2015.

He was re-elected to the Regional Assembly in 2018. However, he was replaced as Marshal by Jakub Chełstowski from Law and Justice. He returned to the Sejm representing the Sosnowiec constituency in the 2019 parliamentary election, winning reelection in 2023. Saługa resigned as a Member of the Sejm in May 2024 after being elected as Marshal by the Regional Assembly.

== See also ==
- Members of Polish Sejm 2005-2007
- Members of Polish Sejm 2007-2011
