= Halina Rozpondek =

Polish politician (born 1950)

Halina Leokadia Rozpondek
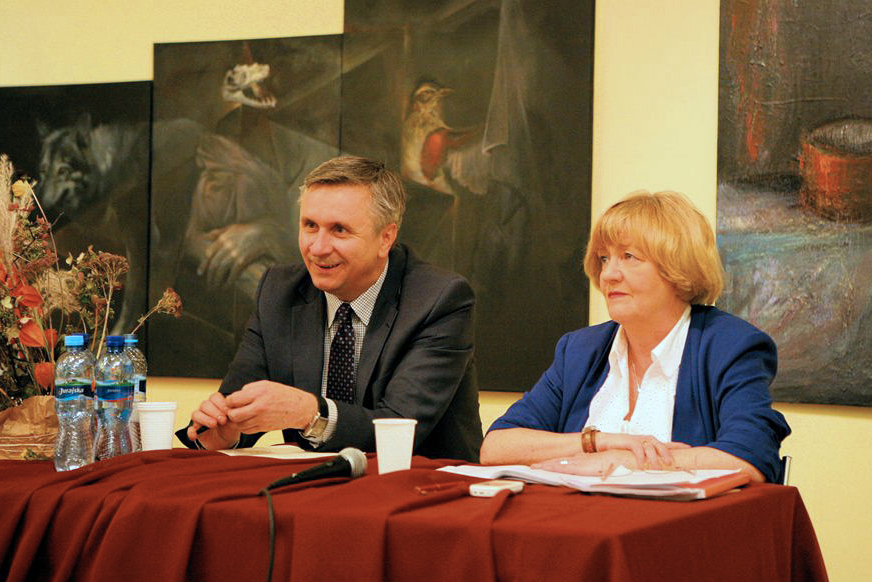

Mayor of Częstochowa
- In office 1995–1998
- Preceded by: Tadeusz Wrona
- Succeeded by: Ewa Janik

Personal details
- Born: 25 May 1950 (age 75) Częstochowa
- Party: Civic Platform

Halina Leokadia Rozpondek (born 25 May 1950 in Częstochowa) is a Polish politician, local government official and librarian.

== Biography ==
She graduated from the University of Wrocław as a librarian. In 1990 she became a councilor of the Częstochowa from Citizens' Committee. In 1995 she voted for the dismissal of President Tadeusz Wrona, who came from the City League, of which she was also a member. In the years 1995–1998 she was the president of Częstochowa, and after the subsequent elections lost by her party, she became an opposition councilor. In 2002 she was elected a councilor of the Silesian Regional Assembly, but she did not stay there. She took the office of deputy mayor of the city, which she held until 2005.

From the list of Civic Platform from Częstochowa, she ran unsuccessfully in the parliamentary election in 2001, but in 2005, 2007, 2011 and 2015 she obtained a parliamentary mandate from Częstochowa. In 2006, in the election for the office of the president of Częstochowa, she obtained the second result (23.89% support). In the second round of elections, she lost to Tadeusz Wrona, who was seeking re-election, receiving 39.23% of the vote.

In 2019 elections she did not receive a parliamentary reelection.
