= Ševínský =

Ševínský (feminine: Ševínská) is a Czech surname. Notable people with the surname include:

- Adam Ševínský (born 2004), Czech footballer
- František Ševínský (born 1979), Czech footballer and video analyst

== See also ==
- Szewiński, a Polish surname
