= Esteban González Pons =

Spanish politician (born 1964)

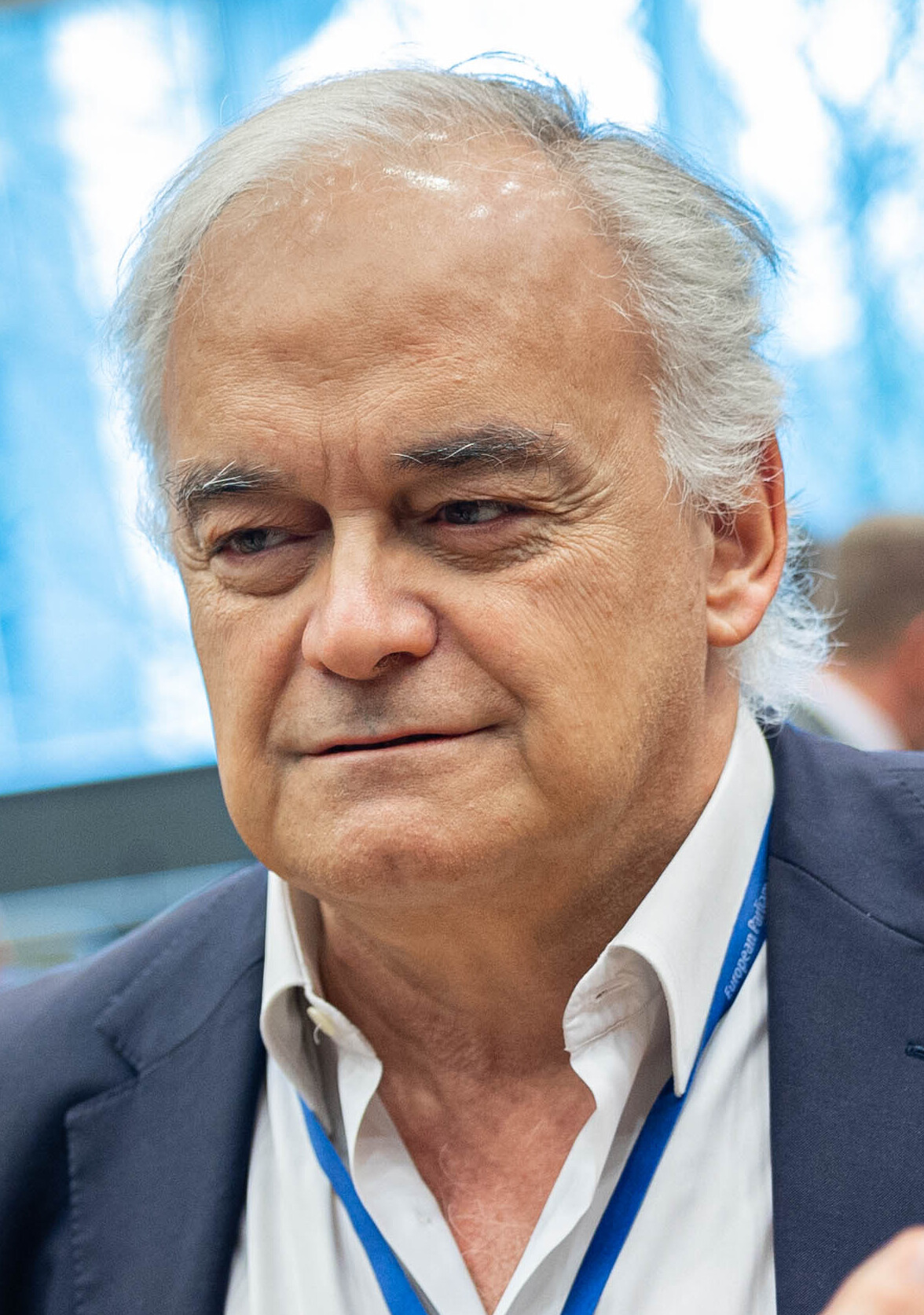
- González Pons in 2024

Member of the European Parliament for Spain
- Incumbent
- Assumed office 16 July 2024
- In office 1 July 2014 – 17 August 2023
- Succeeded by: Ana Collado Jiménez

Member of the Congress of Deputies
- In office 17 August 2023 – 15 July 2024
- Constituency: Valencia
- In office 1 April 2008 – 1 July 2014
- Constituency: Valencia

Member of the Corts Valencianes
- In office 14 June 2007 – 1 April 2008
- Constituency: Valencia

Member of the Senate
- In office 29 June 1993 – 20 June 2003
- Constituency: Valencia

Personal details
- Born: 21 August 1964 (age 62) Valencia, Spain
- Party: People's Party
- Other political affiliations: European People's Party
- Spouse: Pilar Bertolín (m. 2007)
- Children: 3
- Education: University of Valencia
- Occupation: Lawyer • Politician

Esteban González Pons (Spanish pronunciation: [esˈteβaŋ gonˈθaleθ ˈpons]; born 21 August 1964) is a Spanish politician of the People's Party (PP) who was a member of the European Parliament between 2014 and 2023. He was elected to the 15th Congress of Deputies from Valencia in the 2023 Spanish general election. In July 2024 he returned to the European Parliament as vicepresident

== Early life and career ==
Born in Valencia, González Pons is married and has three children. He is the son of Estebán González Bayo, a medical doctor who specialised in endocrinology, and Victoria Pons, who also worked in the medical field as a nurse. He gained a doctorate in law and constitutional rights at University of Valencia and practised as a chess player.

== Political career ==
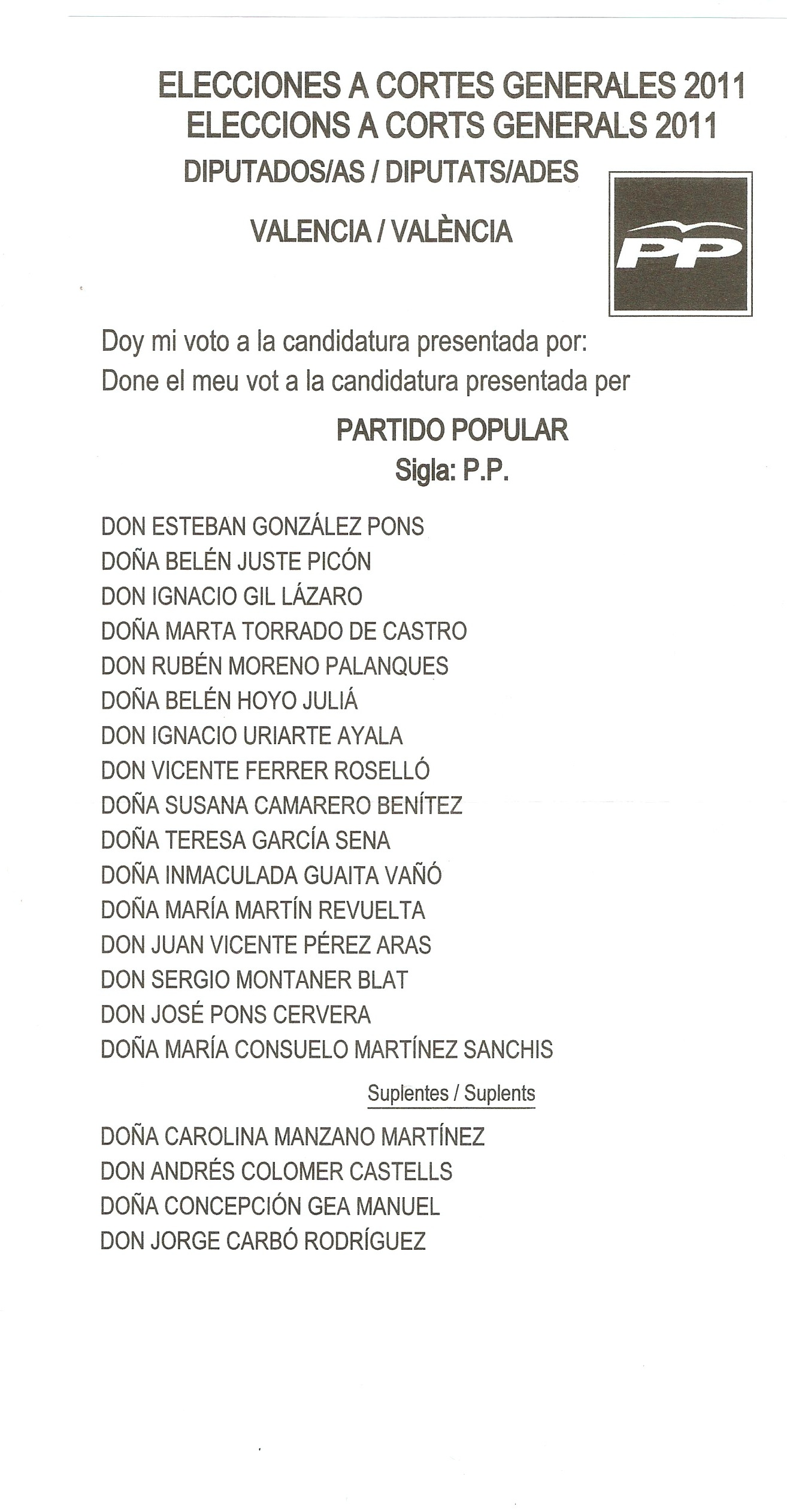
Ballot headed by Esteban González Pons.

=== Career in national politics ===
González Pons entered politics in 1993 serving as senator for Valencia province, in the process becoming the youngest member of the senate. He continued in that role until 2003, resigning after being chosen as minister of culture, education and sport in the Valencian regional parliament. He served as the PP spokesman from 2007 until 2008 when he was elected to the Spanish Congress of Deputies representing Valencia region. He headed the PP list for that election, virtually guaranteeing his election in a district where the PP and predecessors had won at least one seat at every election in the modern Spanish democratic era.

=== Member of the European Parliament, 2014–present ===
In early 2014, the PP chose González Pons to be party’s number 2 for the European elections, following Miguel Arias Cañete. As Member of the European Parliament, he has since been serving on the Committee on Budgets and the Committee on Constitutional Affairs.

González Pons is also a member of the parliament’s delegations for relations with Israel and the Parliamentary Assembly of the Union for the Mediterranean. In addition to his committee assignments, he is a member of the European Parliament Intergroup on LGBT Rights; the European Parliament Intergroup on Children’s Rights; the European Parliament Intergroup on SMEs; and the European Parliament Intergroup on Sports.

When Arias Cañete was nominated as European Commissioner in late 2014, González Pons took over as leader of the Spanish delegation in the EPP Group. In addition, he has been serving as co-chair of the EPP Justice and Home Affairs Ministers Meeting, alongside Thomas de Maizière (until 2018), Kai Mykkänen (2018–2019) and Pieter De Crem (2019–2020) and Annelies Verlinden (since 2020). He also chaired the EPP’s working group on Brexit.

Following the 2019 elections, González Pons was part of a cross-party working group in charge of drafting the European Parliament's four-year work program on the rule of law, borders and migration.

Within the EPP group, González Pons is one of the deputies of chairman Manfred Weber. In 2021, he was appointed to the group's task force for proposing changes to its rules of procedure to allow for “the possibility of the collective termination of membership of a group of Members rather than just individual membership”, alongside Esther de Lange, Othmar Karas, Jan Olbrycht and Paulo Rangel.

== Political positions ==
Following Brexit, González Pons joined Manfred Weber, David McAllister and Sandra Kalniete in co-signing a letter to David Sassoli, the president of the European Parliament, to establish an EU–UK Joint Parliamentary Assembly.

In a joint letter with 15 other MEPs from various political groups, González Pons urged the High Representative of the Union for Foreign Affairs and Security Policy, Josep Borrell, in early 2021 to replace Alberto Navarro, the European Union's ambassador to Cuba, for allegedly siding with the country's Communist leadership.
