= Ewa Janik =

Polish politician (born 1948)

Ewa Maria Janik

Mayor of Częstochowa
- In office 1998–2000
- Preceded by: Halina Rozpondek
- Succeeded by: Wiesław Maras

Personal details
- Born: 19 December 1948 (age 77) Częstochowa
- Party: Democratic Left Alliance

Ewa Maria Janik (born 19 December 1948) is a Polish political figure who served in the national Parliament (Sejm) from September 1997 to November 2007. Ewa Janik served as a Mayor of Częstochowa from 1998 to 2000.

A native of the historic southern city of Częstochowa, formerly the capital of Częstochowa Voivodeship and, since 1999, a part of Silesian Voivodeship, Ewa Janik is a member of the Democratic Left Alliance and was initially elected to the Sejm in the Polish parliamentary election of 1997. She was re-elected in 2001 and, in the election of 2005, received 6077 votes in Częstochowa district 28. She did not stand for re-election in 2007.

== See also ==
- Members of Polish Sejm 2005–2007
