= Piotr Kurpios =

Polish politician

Mayor of Częstochowa
- In office 2009–2010
- Preceded by: Tadeusz Wrona
- Succeeded by: Krzysztof Matyjaszczyk

Personal details
- Born: 4 April 1963 (age 62) Częstochowa, Poland
- Party: Civic Platform

Piotr Kurpios (born 4 April 1963 in Częstochowa) is a Polish politician, local official, doctor associated with Częstochowa.

He was the acting mayor of Częstochowa from 2009 to 2010, due to dismiss in referendum former mayor, Tadeusz Wrona. Kurpios belonged to Civic Platform.
