= Margarida Marques =

Portuguese politician

Margarida Marques MEP

Member of the European Parliament for Portugal
- In office 1 July 2019 – 15 July 2024

Personal details
- Born: 3 February 1954 (age 72) Bombarral, Portugal
- Party: Socialist Party

Maria Margarida Ferreira Marques (born 3 February 1954) is a Portuguese politician of the Socialist Party who served as a Member of the European Parliament between 2019 and 2024.

== Early career ==
In 1994 Marques moved to Brussels where she started working for the European Commission, first in the Directorate-General for Education and Culture (DG EAC), then in the Directorate-General for Communication (DG COMM). She subsequently held the position of European Commission representative in Portugal from 2005 to 2011.

== Career in national politics ==
From 2015 until 2019, Marques was a member of the Parliament of Portugal. During that time, she served as State Secretary for European Affairs in the government of Prime Minister António Costa from 2015 until 2017.

== Member of the European Parliament ==
Marques has been a Member of the European Parliament since the 2019 European elections. In parliament, she has since been serving on the Committee on Budgets. In this capacity, she was the parliament's co-rapporteur (alongside Jan Olbrycht) on the European Union's Multiannual Financial Framework (MFF) for 2021–2027. In 2020, she also joined the Committee on International Trade.

In addition to her committee assignments, Marques is part of the parliament's delegations for relations with China and the Parliamentary Assembly of the Union for the Mediterranean. She is also a member of the European Parliament Intergroup on Anti-Racism and Diversity.

== Honours ==
- Greece: Grand Cross of the Order of Honour (21 April 2017)
- Luxembourg: Grand Cross of the Order of Merit of the Grand Duchy of Luxembourg (23 May 2017)
- Spain: Dame Grand Cross of the Order of Isabella the Catholic (28 November 2016)
