= Emperor-Maximilian-Prize =

European prize in the field of european local and regional politics

The Emperor-Maximilian-Prize for European Service at the Regional and Local Level, is a European Prize in the field of European local and regional politics, awarded by the City of Innsbruck and the Region of Tyrol (Austria).

== Criteria for submissions ==
Submitted projects should: have an innovative focus; pursue new approaches or organisational methods; and include an assessment of the effects and developments of the project objectives, or the expected effects. Decisive here are the diverse aspects of European integration. Critical criteria include: the effectiveness of the project; sustainability and creativity; and the focus on motivating other target groups to engage independently with Europe.

== Awarding ==
The Emperor-Maximilian-Prize will be awarded every two years starting in 2019. The prize consists of a certificate, a medal (1509 Emperor Maximilian I medallion) and a cash prize in the amount of € 10,000. The cash prize is earmarked for the awarded project.
In 2019, the project "Rückenwind – Solidarity with the forgotten corners" was honoured for its European service at regional and local level.

== Emperor-Maximilian-Prize 2021 ==
In 2021, the motto of the Emperor-Maximilian-Prize was "Facing challenges together – for a stronger Europe". The focus was on all those projects that maintain their European ties despite the ongoing global crisis. In an international jury meeting in early March, the winning project was determined. It was honoured at the award ceremony in October 2021. Nana Walzer and Daniel Gerer accepted the prize in Innsbruck on behalf of the prize-winning project. The official award ceremony was framed by a students' event as well as a citizens' event. At the events, the winning project was also represented by Alexa Waschkau and Alexander Waschkau (Hoaxilla), Martin Moder and Florian Aigner (What the Fact), Sophia and Tommy Krappweis, Holm Gero Hümmler and Bernd Harder (WildMics-Ferngespräche).

== Background ==
The prize, named after Emperor Maximilian I, was established in 1997 by the Region of Tyrol and the City of Innsbruck on the occasion of the 85th birthday of Innsbruck Mayor Alois Lugger. Since then, the award has honoured outstanding achievements of personalities and institutions in European regional and local politics. In particular, efforts to implement the principle of subsidiarity and the contents of the European Charter of Local Self-Government and the European Charter of Regional Self-Government of the Council of Europe have been honoured.
In the context of the preparations for the 2019 Emperor Maximilian Commemorative Year, the Region of Tyrol and the City of Innsbruck jointly decided at the beginning of 2018 to fundamentally renew the existing tender and award process in order to make the overall concept of the award even more citizen-oriented and inclusive. Instead of awarding prizes for outstanding individual achievements, the call for entries will in future be directed at outstanding projects and initiatives that are committed to the central goals of the European unification process in a joint, creative and sustainable manner. In addition, the award has been renamed to “Emperor Maximilian Prize for European Service at the Regional and Local Level”. From now on, the call for applications is directed in particular at individuals, groups of persons (societies and associations), research institutions, interest groups and local authorities of all 47 Council of Europe member states, plus Belarus. Applications will be accepted exclusively via the application platform integrated into the homepage, whereby the application form can be filled in with German, English or French. The decision on the winning project will be announced after an (international) expert jury meeting.

== Award recipients ==
1998: Jordi Pujol
1999: Josef Hofmann
2000: Luc Van den Brande
2001: Josephine Farrington
2002: Erwin Teufel and Heinrich Hoffschulte
2003: Alain Chénard
2004: Elisabeth Gateau
2005: Jan Olbrycht
2007: Michael Häupl and Graham Meadows
2008: Dora Bakoyannis
2009: Giovanni Di Stasi
2010: Halvdan Skard
2011: Danuta Hübner
2012: Keith Whitmore
2013: Karl-Heinz Lambertz
2014: Herwig van Staa
2015: Mercedes Bresso
2016: Anders Knape
2017: Nicola Sturgeon
2019: Project Rückenwind – Solidarity with the forgotten corners
2021: #EUROPAgegenCovid19/#EUmythbusters (Nana Walzer, Daniel Gerer)
