= Jakub Chełstowski =

Marshal of Silesian Voivodeship from 2018 to 2024

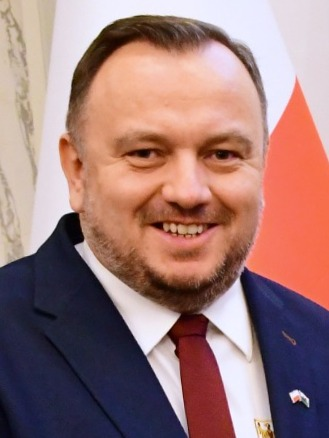
- Chełstowski in 2024

8th Marshal of Silesia
- In office 21 November 2018 – 6 May 2024
- Preceded by: Wojciech Saługa
- Succeeded by: Wojciech Saługa

Member of the Silesian Voivodeship Sejmik for District 2
- In office 21 October 2018 – 7 April 2024

Member of Tychy City Council for District 3
- In office 21 November 2010 – 21 October 2018

Personal details
- Born: Jakub Piotr Chełstowski; 7 April 1981 (age 45) Tychy, Poland
- Party: Yes! For Poland (since 2022); Law and Justice (2017–2022); Tychy Our Little Homeland (2006–2017)
- Other political affiliations: Civic Coalition (since 2023); Silesian Autonomy Movement (2013–2014)
- Spouse: Beata (m. 2004)
- Children: 2
- Education: Korczak University – Academy of Applied Sciences; SGH Warsaw School of Economics; University of Economics in Katowice

Jakub Piotr Chełstowski (born 7 April 1981) is a Polish executive and politician who served as the eighth marshal of Silesia and as a member of the Silesian Voivodeship Sejmik from 2018 to 2024. A member of Yes! For Poland (T!DPL) since 2022, he was previously a member of Law and Justice (PiS) from 2017 to 2022 and Tychy Our Little Homeland, a localist party in Tychy, from 2006 to 2017, which he led from 2014 to 2017.

Chełstowski was born in Tychy in 1981. He joined Tychy Our Little Homeland in 2006, becoming its vice-president before getting elected to represent the party on Tychy City Council in the 2010 Polish local elections, where he became leader of the opposition and feuded with Tychy's Civic Platform (PO) mayor Andrzej Dziuba, accusing him of corruption and mishandling funds. He became president of Tychy Our Little Homeland ahead of the 2014 local elections, where he was re-elected to a second term on the council and unsuccessfully stood against Dziuba for the mayoralty in an electoral pact with the Silesian Autonomy Movement (RAŚ), coming in second place with 18.76% of the vote to Dziuba's 64.76%.

From 2015, Chełstowski associated himself with PiS in Silesia, formally joining the party and leaving Tychy Our Little Homeland in 2017. In 2018, he was elected to represent PiS on the Silesian Voivodeship Sejmik, which also elected him as the eighth marshal of Silesia, succeeding PO's Wojciech Saługa. He defected from PiS to join T!DPL in 2022 but continued to serve as marshal until 2024, when he was succeeded by Saługa who was elected for another term in the role.

== Early life and career ==
Jakub Piotr Chełstowski was born in Tychy on 7 April 1981, the son of Zbigniew and Anna. He studied at Korczak University – Academy of Applied Sciences in Katowice, where he graduated with a master's degree in social science and pedagogy, and at SGH Warsaw School of Economics, where he received a postgraduate degree in business management. He completed his studies at the University of Economics in Katowice, where he graduated with a postgraduate degree in European project management in 2010.

Chełstowski began his career at the Mining Electronics Plant of Tychy, where he worked as an electronics engineer. He then worked at an automotive factory in the Katowice Special Economic Zone. After this, in the late 2000s, he worked as a community organiser for the Teresa housing cooperative in Tychy. He left Teresa in 2009 to work at the Oskard housing cooperative, also in Tychy, where he worked as a marketing and development specialist until 2014. He served as a probation officer at Tychy District Court from 2007 to 2014 and later became a director of ownership supervision and strategic assets at the Silesia Financial Society. He also became president of the Tychy-based Vistula Tourist Agency.

== Early political career ==
=== Early activities in Tychy ===
In 2006, Chełstowski joined the Tychy Nasza Mała Ojczyzna (English: Tychy Our Little Homeland) party, one of the main local political parties in Tychy alongside the governing electoral list of Tychy's Civic Platform mayor Andrzej Dziuba, after watching televised Tychy City Council debates and agreeing with its policy platform. He became a close friend and associate of Witold Bańka, who was also active in the party at this time, and eventually rose up the ranks to become its vice president, having been encouraged to do so by its leadership for his high level of participation in the party and his youth.

Chełstowski first rose to public prominence in 2008, when he was sued for defamation by the municipal education board of Tychy after he suggested the board and Tychy City Council's chairman Michał Gramatyka were corrupt on an episode of the national television programme Misja specjalna, after the board granted Gramatyka a contract to run the official city website. The education board sued Chełstowski for defamation but lost after a five month court battle, which ended in Chełstowski's favour in March 2009 when the court ruled that he had the right to express his views and publicly scrutinise the city's public bodies. In the aftermath of the case, Chełstowski publicly criticised Mayor Dziuba for the "sick situation in the city" where the municipal government had "[used] public money to fund trials in retaliation for critical words of truth", accusing him of the first "sad, historic act" of "repression" since the fall of communism in 1989 and comparing the political climate of Tychy to Belarus.

=== Feud with Andrzej Dziuba ===
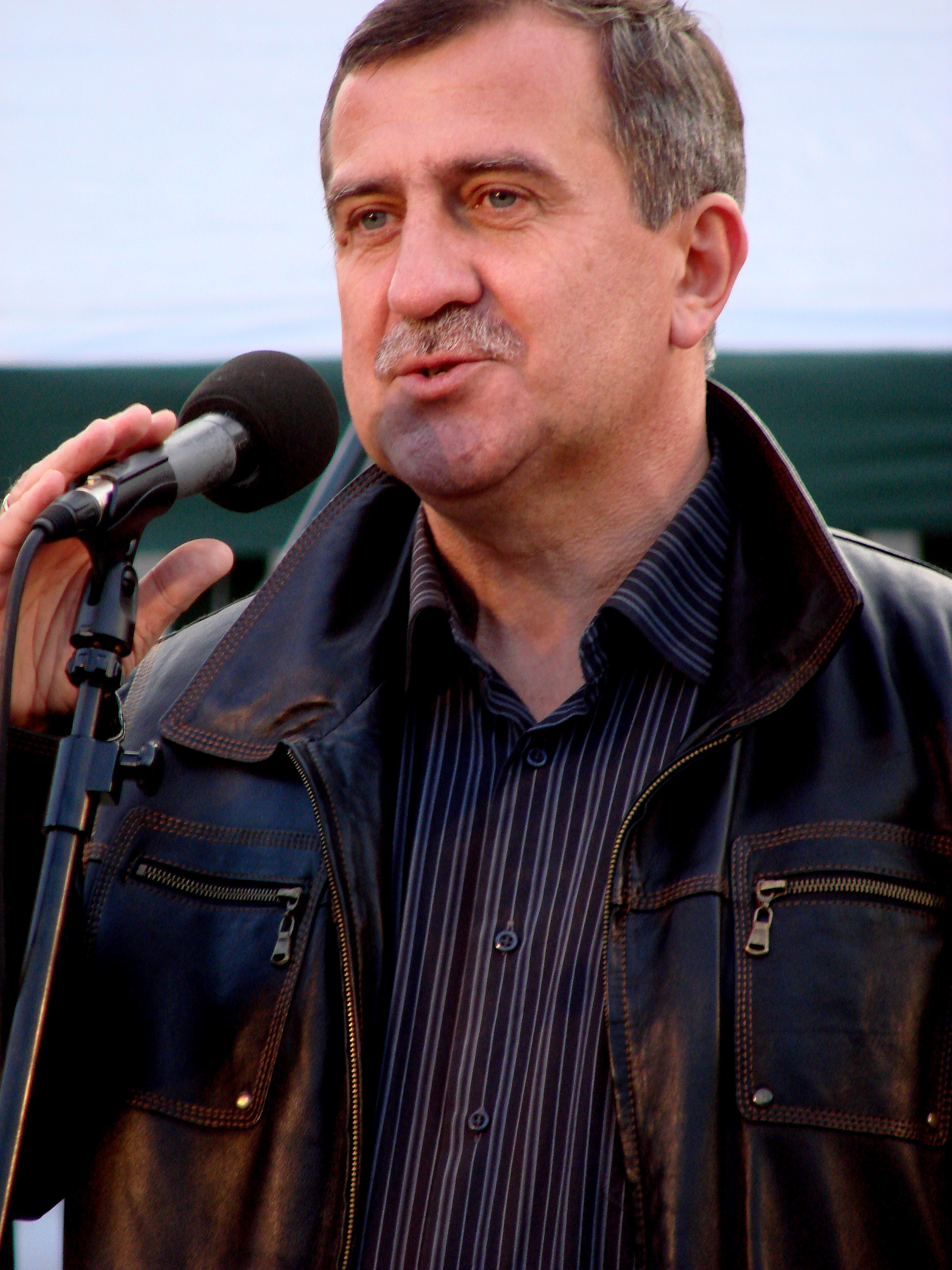
Andrzej Dziuba, Mayor of Tychy from 2000 to 2023

In the 2010 local elections, Chełstowski stood on Tychy Our Little Homeland's electoral list for District 3 of Tychy City Council. Chełstowski was successfully elected to represent District 3 on the council for Tychy Our Little Homeland, where he initiated a public feud with Dziuba, accusing him of corruption and mishandling public funds. By the end of his first term on the council in 2014, he had asked over 200 questions to Dziuba and built up a reputation as his main political opponent. In 2022, fellow councillor Michał Gramatyka said of Chełstowski:

I consider him an ambitious man, pushing ahead without compromise, unfortunately often over dead bodies. When he sets himself a goal, he will stop at nothing to overcome all the obstacles to achieving it […] He was [Andrzej Dziuba]'s fierce opponent. He wrote letters to the prosecutor's office, sued the city, and drafted hundreds of questions directed against Andrzej Dziuba.

— Michał Gramatyka

During his first term, Chełstowski broke the news that the city council under Dziuba's mayoralty had spent around half-a-million złoty from 2009 to 2011 on catering services at special banquets for the mayor and his guests. In 2014, he reported Dziuba to the public prosecutor's office, accusing him of illegally wasting public funds after he waived a 12 million złoty city council fine against local developers for delays to reconstruction works for National Road 1, arguing that this money could have been used instead to invest into local services. However, Dziuba's administration argued that enforcing the fine would have cost far more than 12 million złoty, with the council forced to find new contractors and possibly left liable for legal action by the developers, and the prosecutor's office threw out the case. Chełstowski also reported Dziuba's head of Tychy Municipal Cultural Centre, Wojciech Wieczorek, to the prosecutor's office after the Audit Department of Tychy City Council discovered significant financial irregularities in the public spending for the centre from 2012 to 2013, but this case was also dismissed in 2015.

Chełstowski opposed Dziuba's plans to privatise Tychy Hospital and worked with Solidarity to successfully pressure Dziuba to abandon the plans. After this, Dziuba reportedly attempted to have Chełstowski sacked from his job at Oskard in 2014, with the city council having the power to decide his dismissal, though he backed down after Solidarity and Chełstowski's supporters, including Michał Wójcik, protested against Chełstowski's dismissal outside Tychy City Council in February 2014.

=== 2014 Tychy mayoral candidacy ===
In the run-up to the 2014 local elections, Chełstowski won a power struggle with the existing leadership of Tychy Our Little Homeland, seizing the party presidency and becoming leader of the opposition in Tychy City Council after forcing the resignation of its previous president Barbara Konieczna when she tried to accept an offer by Dziuba to join him in a coalition administration. Chełstowski and the rest of the party opposed a coalition, and in March 2014 Konieczna and her ally Stefan Moćko left the party in protest, citing Chełstowski's campaign against her and a difference in political views. In 2013, Chełstowski agreed an electoral pact with the local branch of the Silesian Autonomy Movement (RAŚ) for the local elections, which agreed to select him as its joint-candidate for the Tychy mayoral election with Tychy Our Little Homeland, in a direct challenge to Dziuba's mayorship. In the local elections, he also led Tychy Our Little Homeland as its lead candidate for the city council election.

In his election campaign, Chełstowski ran on the slogan of a "modern, honest and safe Tychy". He criticised the administration of Dziuba for corruption and nepotism and also accused the council of failing to maintain checks and balances against him, highlighting that several senior city councillors and their family members had taken up senior positions in municipal bodies and agencies. As the joint-candidate of Tychy Our Little Homeland and the RAŚ, he aimed to incorporate elements of both party's platforms into his campaign. His manifesto included policy pledges designed to conserve citizens' money, such as free bus and tram travel, free transportation to cultural institutions, a reduction in parking and waste collection fees and a cut in property tax for two years. He also adopted many of the same pledges made by Dziuba, including the construction of an athletics stadium, taking ownership of Silesia Provincial Hospital, introducing a municipal bike rental scheme and renovating streets, street lights and sidewalks.

The mayoral election was won by Dziuba, who was re-elected to his fourth term as mayor in the first round of the contest with 25,801 votes, or 64.76% of the vote. Chełstowski came in second place with 7,474 votes, or 18.76%, ahead of Grzegorz Kołodziejczyk from Law and Justice (PiS) who won 12.79% of the vote. In the city council election, Chełstowski was re-elected to a second term on the city council after Tychy Our Little Homeland's list came in third place with 5,933 votes, or 15.74% of the vote, winning 4 of 25 seats, behind PiS with 7 seats and Dziuba and PO's lists with 13 seats. Tychy Our Little Homeland came ahead of the list of Barbara Konieczna, Chełstowski's predecessor as party leader who decided to run on her own list, who won the final seat on the council. After the local elections, Chełstowski left the RAŚ, later stating in 2019 that he had supported the movement because he believed they supported the economic development of Tychy and Silesia, but soon became alienated from the party after its leader Jerzy Gorzelik made statements disputing the Polish identity of Silesia and "revising historical facts".

At the end of the election campaign, Chełstowski was targeted by an anonymous libel campaign against him and his family, alleged to have been perpetrated by Maciej Gramatyka, the brother of Tychy City Council chairman Michał Gramatyka and a campaigner for Mayor Dziuba's re-election campaign. Chełstowski reported the matter to the police and initiated a private prosecution against Maciej Gramatyka. The case went to court, where Gramatyka apologised to Chełstowski but pled not guilty. Chełstowski and Gramatyka failed to reach a settlement, and Gramatyka was eventually acquitted in 2015.

== Marshal of Silesia ==
He served as Marshal of Silesia from 2018 to 2024.

== Personal life ==
Chełstowski is married with a wife, Beata, who he married in 2004. They have two children, a son and a daughter. In 2015, the family were involved in a car crash when the engine stalled on a busy road after an unknown perpetrator sabotaged their car by pouring sugar into the petrol tank. A police investigation into the incident failed to find the perpetrator, who has since remained unidentified.

In 2021, Chełstowski was awarded the Gold Cross of Merit by President Andrzej Duda for services to society and local government.
