= Jan Olbrycht =

Polish politician of the Civic Platform (born 1952)

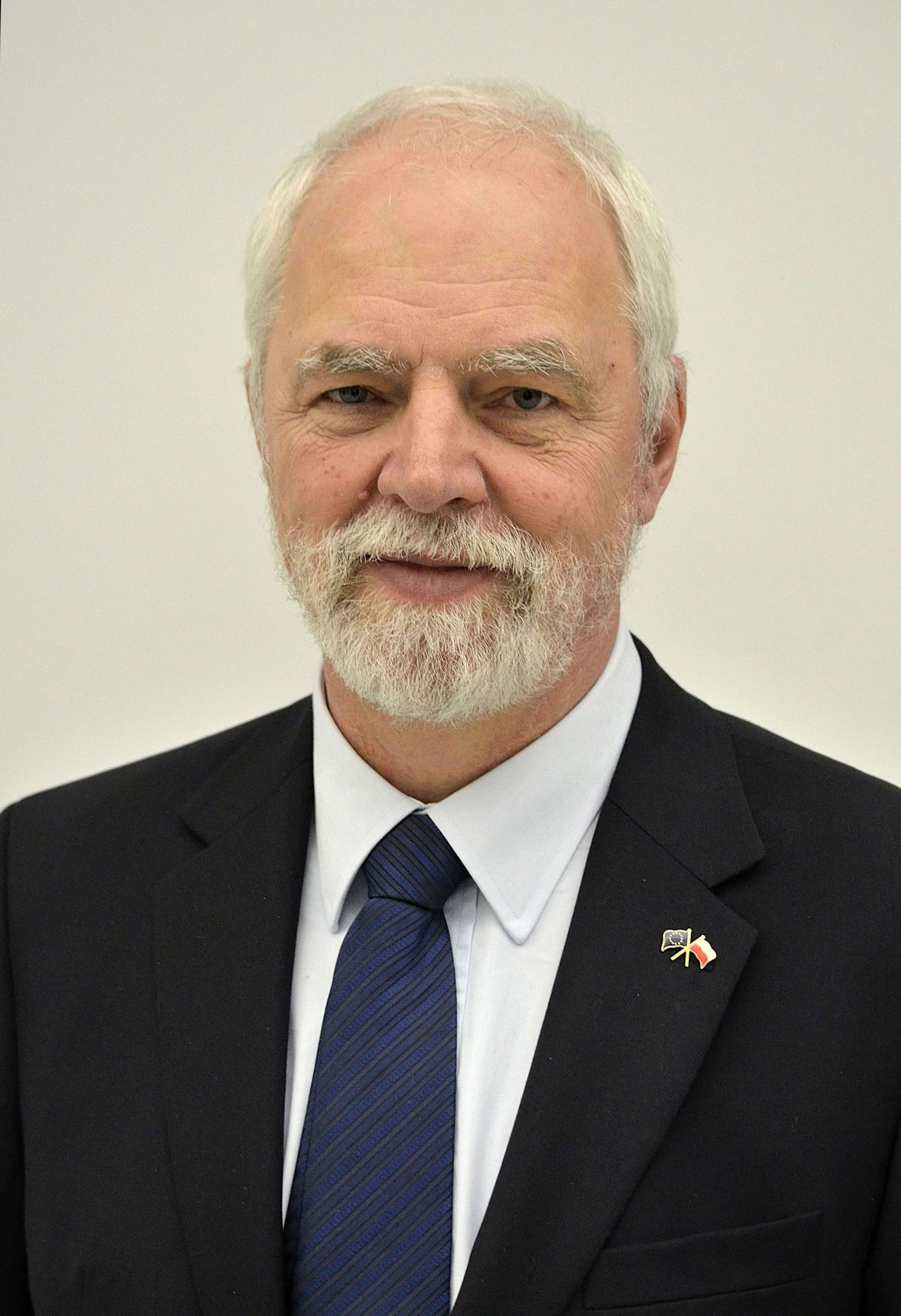

Member of the European Parliament for Silesia
- Incumbent
- Assumed office 20 July 2004

1st Marshal of Silesian Voivodeship
- In office 1 January 1999 – 26 November 2002
- Preceded by: Inaugural holder
- Succeeded by: Michał Czarski

Personal details
- Born: 22 September 1952 (age 74) Rybnik, Poland
- Party: Civic Platform (2004–present)
- Other political affiliations: Solidarity Electoral Action (1997–2001); Social Movement (2002–2004)
- Children: 2
- Education: Jagiellonian University
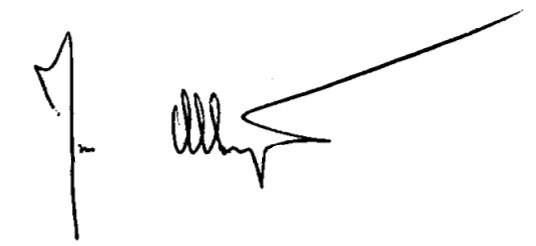
- Signature
- Website: janolbrycht.pl

Jan Marian Olbrycht (born 21 September 1952, in Rybnik) is a Polish politician of the Civic Platform who has been serving Member of the European Parliament (MEP) for Silesian Voivodeship since 2004. Olbrycht sits as part of the European People's Party. Before entering European politics, he was the first Marshal of Silesian Voivodeship between 1999 and 2002.

== Education ==
- 1984: Doctor of Sociology, Jagiellonian University
- Lecturer

== Political career ==
=== Career in national politics ===
- 2002-2004: Chairman of the Policy Council of the Social Movement
- since 2004: Member of the National Council of the Citizens' Platform
- 1990-1998: Mayor and member of the town council in Cieszyn
- 1998-2004: Regional Councillor of the Silesian Voivodeship
- 1998-2002: Marshal of the Silesian Voivodeship
- 1995-2001: Vice-Chairman of the Council of European Municipalities and Regions
- 2000-2004: Member of the Organisation of the Assembly of European Regions (ARE)
- 2004: Member of the World Council of United Cities and Local Governments
- 2000-2004: Member of the National Council for Regional Policy
- since 2003: Member of the Committee for National Spatial Planning, Polish Academy of Sciences (PAN)

=== Member of the European Parliament, 2004–present ===
Olbrycht has been a Member of the European Parliament since the 2004 European elections. In parliament, he has since served on the Committee on Regional Development (2004–2014), the Committee on Budgetary Control (2009–2011) and the Committee on Budgets (since 2014). In the latter capacity, he is the parliament's co-rapporteur (alongside Margarida Marques) on the European Union's Multiannual Financial Framework (MFF) for 2021–2027.

In addition to his committee assignments, Olbrycht has been part of the parliament's delegations for relations with China (2004–2009); Albania, Bosnia and Herzegovina, Serbia, Montenegro and Kosovo (2009–2014); the countries of Southeast Asia and the Association of Southeast Asian Nations (2014–2019); and Canada (since 2019). He also chairs the URBAN Intergroup and is a member of the European Internet Forum.

Following the 2019 elections, Olbrycht was part of a cross-party working group in charge of drafting the European Parliament's four-year work program on digitization.

Within the centre-right European People's Party Group (EPP) group, Olbrycht is one of the deputies of chairman Manfred Weber. In 2021, he was appointed to the group's task force for proposing changes to its rules of procedure to allow for “the possibility of the collective termination of membership of a group of Members rather than just individual membership”, alongside Esteban González Pons, Othmar Karas, Esther de Lange and Paulo Rangel.

== Decorations and awards ==
- Knight's Cross of the Order of Polonia Restituta (2000)
- Emperor-Maximilian-Prize (2005)
- Franciszka Cegielska's Rose Award (2010)
- MEP Award in the economic and monetary affairs category (2018)

== See also ==
- 2004 European Parliament election in Poland

Political offices
Preceded by Inaugural holder	Marshal of Silesia; 1999 – 2002	Succeeded by Michał Czarski
Preceded by Ryszard Mazur	Mayor of Cieszyn; 1990 – 1998	Succeeded by Bogdan Ficek
