= Self-Governance Union =

2002 electoral committee in Poland

The Self-Governance Union (Polish: Unia Samorządowa, US) was an nationwide electoral committee founded on the behalf of the Freedom Union for the 2002 Polish local elections. The committee was founded when the leadership of UW decided to start independently in the 2002 local elections. Its founding was consecutive to the dissolution of the "Electors' Committee Democratic "Community 2002"" operated by the Freedom Union, Social Movement and Conservative People's Party.

== History ==
The decision of Freedom Union to create a separate committee for the 2002 elections under different name was caused by the party's organisational and identity problems, along with the party's failure in the 2001 Polish parliamentary election.

Before founding the Self-Governance Union, Freedom Union sought to form an electoral alliance for the 2002 elections, Democratic Front Community 2002 (Polish: Front Demokratyczny Wspólnota 2002), together with two right-of-centre parties - the Social Movement and the Conservative People's Party. The goal of the alliance was to "defend democracy from Andrzej Lepper", who was a far-left populist and leader of the Self-Defence of the Republic of Poland. The alliance collapsed because Freedom Union sought to adjust the alliance's symbolism and name to its own, proposing the name of Self-Governance Union. Social Movement and the Conservative People's Party refused the change. After Freedom Union accused its electoral partners of undermining its popularity (the party polled 4%, but after it formed the alliance, its support fell), the alliance was dissolved and the Self-Governance Union was formed. The Conservative People's Party pursued talks with Law and Justice instead.

Self-Governance Union was built around Freedom Union, but it advertised itself as an independent, regionalist committee. According to Polish political scientist Maciej Onasz, this strategy was pursued by numerous right-of-centre parties in the 2002 local elections, including remnants of the Solidarity Electoral Action. He argues that committees such as the Self-Governance should "be seen as a search for lifeboats by fragmented political circles." Freedom Union sought to copy the strategy of mainstream parties such as Civic Platform and the Polish People's Party, which likewise competed in local elections through localist and regionalist committees under different names.

Freedom Union justified the creation of the Self-Governance Union by stating that "current electoral regulations [of local elections] have condemned non-governmental organizations to electoral non-existence". The committee's campaign was described as neglected. Locally, Self-Governance Union used different names meant to promote its more well-known candidates, such as "Witold Rosset - Łódź na fali". It failed to advance to second round in mayoral and local presidential elections; it did not issue endorsements for the runoffs.

It failed to register an electoral list in some of the districts. Despite registering lists in most districts of every voivodeships, it managed to cross the 5% electoral threshold needed to gain seats in only two voivodeships - the Lower Silesian Voivodeship (7.49%) and Silesian Voivodeship (5.82%). Conversely, its 3 seats came from these two voivodeships alone - 2 from Lower Silesia, and 1 from Silesia.

As the committee managed to win only three seats, its performance was considered a failure and a confirmation of the Freedom Union's collapse that had already been made visible in the 2001 Polish parliamentary election. It won 2.29% of the nationwide vote, and its 3 elected candidates were: Antoni Piechniczek in Silesia and Emilian Stańczyszyn and Artur Zieliński in Lower Silesia.

The centre-left Democratic Left Alliance and the Self-Governance Union's declared enemy, the far-left populist Self-Defence of the Republic of Poland, were considered victors of the election. The Union dissolved after the elections. Three more Freedom Union-affiliated members of voivodeship sejmiks were elected from the lists of SLD-UP, and one from the Małopolska Community.

== Program ==
The committee's slogan was "A small homeland with great opportunities" (Polish: Mała Ojczyzna dużych możliwości); its political program promoted business interests, advocated entering and seeking aid from the European Union and investment from Western Europe, along with launching regional high-speed railways, investing in tourism, and "seeking employment for Poles in other European countries". It declared that it had "a clear centre-right agenda" It was described as right-wing.

It argued that Polish economy can be improved by creating better conditions for investors and that Poland must join the European Union, claiming that it would otherwise be "doomed to a relationship with Moscow". It argued that Poland has the same cultural background with Western Europe, rather than Russia. It accused populist and Catholic-nationalist parties such as Self-Defence of the Republic of Poland, League of Polish Families and Christian National Union of being a threat to democracy, and criticized parties such as Civic Platform for not ruling cooperation with them. Self-Governance Union was accused of elitism, as many of its candidates were wealthy businessmen, with Kurier Poranny remarking that the candidates of all other parties look like "beggars" in comparison.
