= Andrzej Szewiński =

Polish volleyball player, sports activist, and politician

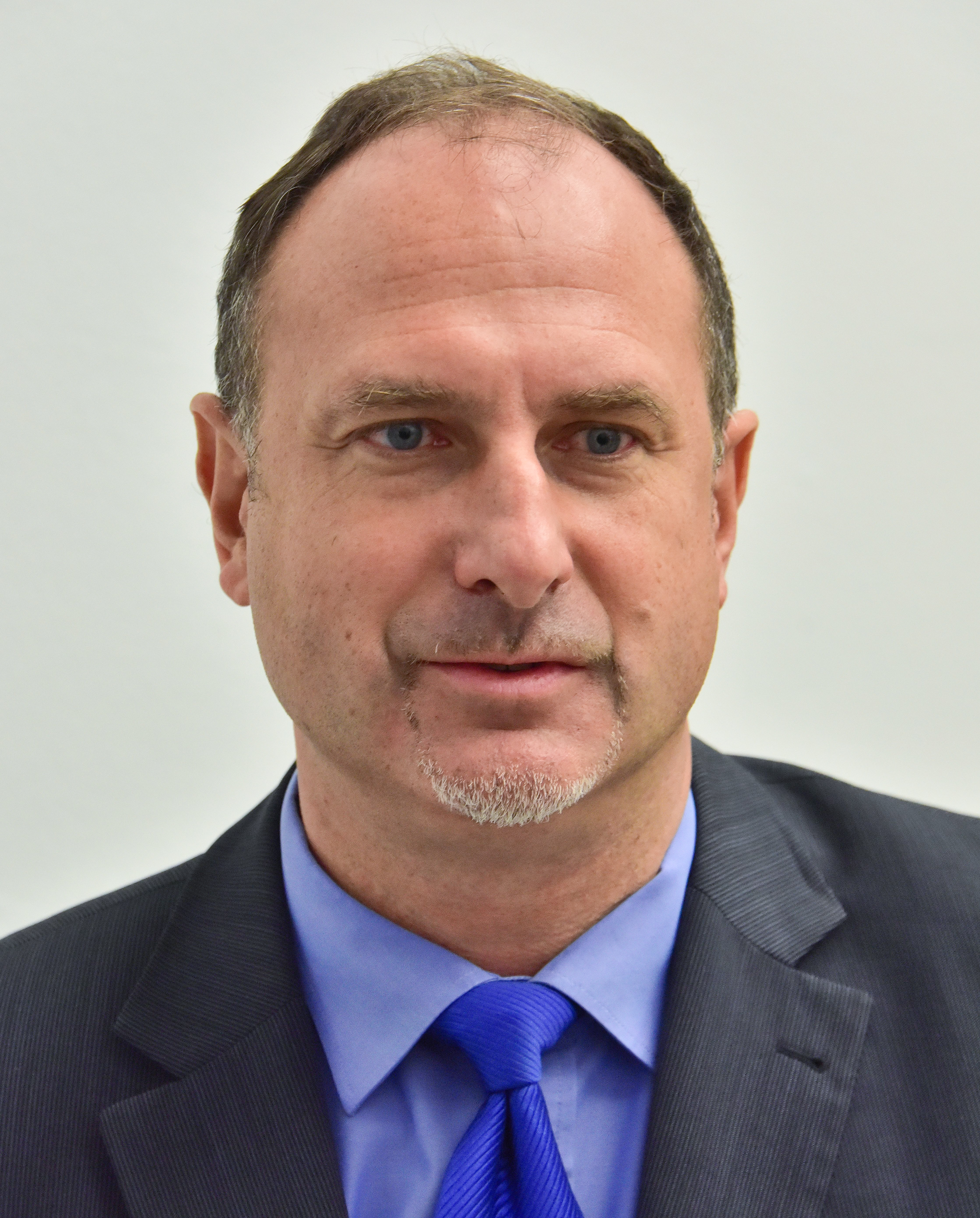

Member of Sejm
- Incumbent
- Assumed office 12 November 2019
- Constituency: Częstochowa

Member of Senate
- In office 5 November 2007 – 11 November 2015
- Succeeded by: Artur Warzocha
- Constituency: Częstochowa

Personal details
- Born: 20 February 1970 (age 55) Warsaw, Poland
- Party: Civic Coalition
- Sports career
- Height: 198 cm (6 ft 6 in)
- Sport: Volleyball
- Club: AZS Częstochowa; Bipop Brescia; Maccabi Tel Aviv; Beşiktaş JK; Galatasaray S.K.
- Retired: 2005

Andrzej Szewiński (born 20 February 1970) is a Polish former professional volleyball player (198 cm, opposite hitter), sport activist and politician. He is the son of the sprinter Irena Szewińska.

== Career as sportsman ==
From 1989/90 to 2004/05 (altogether 16 seasons), he played for AZS Częstochowa, Bipop Brescia, Maccabi Tel Aviv, Beşiktaş JK and Galatasaray S.K.

== Political activity ==
From 2006 to 2007, he was a councilor of the Silesian Regional Assembly from PO. In the parliamentary election in 2007 he was elected to a Senate in Częstochowa district, receiving 81,777 votes. Later he joined Civic Platform. In the parliamentary election in 2011, he won 37,471 votes and again won a seat to Senate from Częstochowa district. In 2014, he ran for the presidency of Częstochowa, taking 4th place out of 7 candidates. In 2015, Artur Warzocha defeated him in his senatorial reelection bid. On 30 December 2015, he replaced Krzysztof Łoziński as the vice-president of Częstochowa. In 2018, he ran unsuccessfully for the regional assembly. In the parliamentary election in 2019 he was elected to Sejm in Częstochowa district.
