= Artur Warzocha =

Polish politician (born 1969)

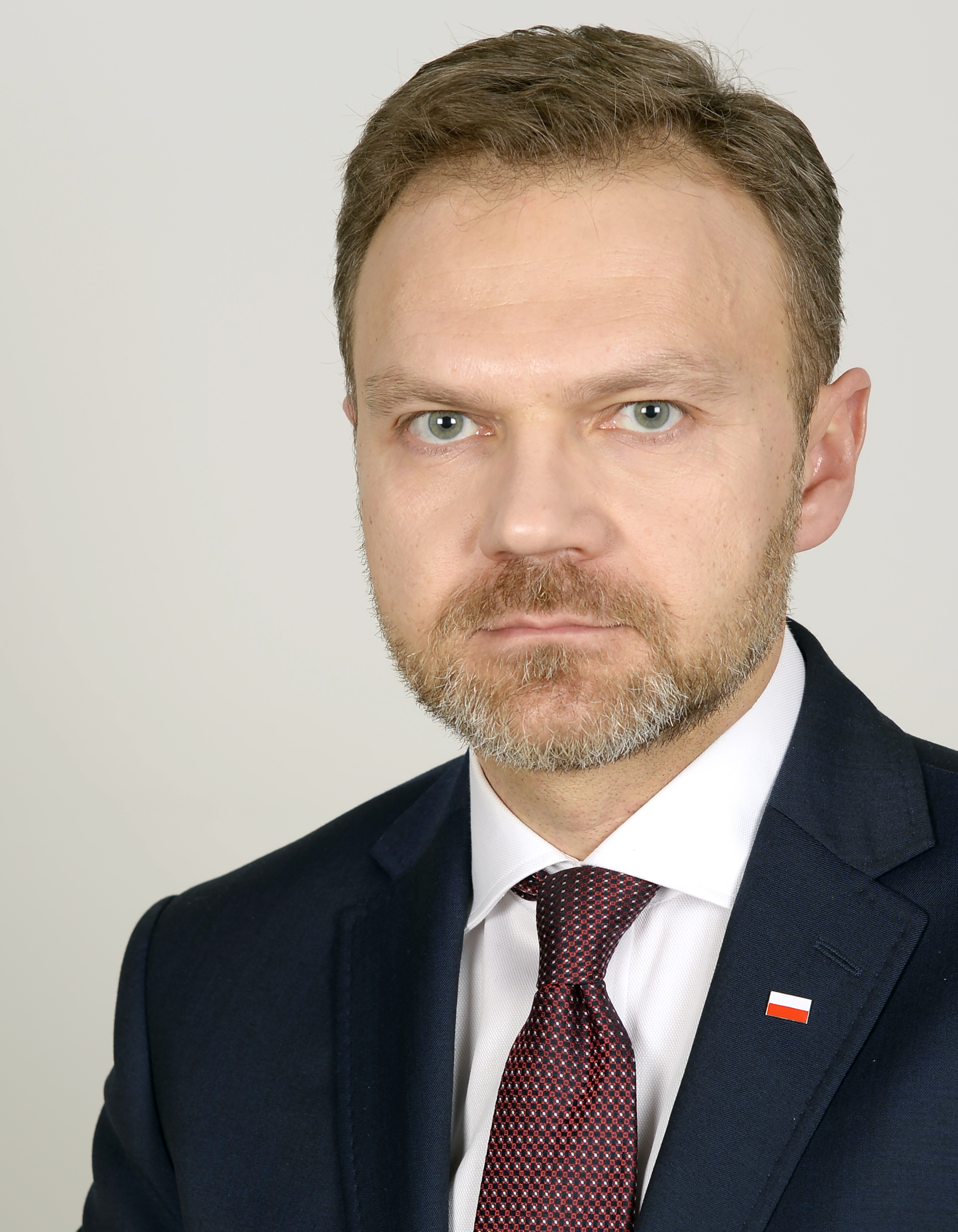

Member of Senate
- In office 2015–2019
- Preceded by: Andrzej Szewiński
- Succeeded by: Wojciech Konieczny
- Constituency: 69-Częstochowa

Personal details
- Born: 11 November 1969 (age 56) Piotrków Trybunalski
- Party: Law and Justice

Artur Ryszard Warzocha (born 11 November 1969, in Piotrków Trybunalski) is a Polish politician, local official, first deputy voivode of Silesia (2006–2007), and member of the Senate of the Republic of Poland since 2015.

== Biography ==
He graduated from the Faculty of Pedagogy of the Pedagogical University in Częstochowa, and completed post-graduate studies at the Warsaw School of Economics. He became an academic teacher at the Institute of Political Sciences of the Jan Długosz University.

In 1998 and in 2002 he was elected to the Częstochowa City Council. In 2009, he unsuccessfully ran for the European Parliament. In 2010, he was elected a councilor of the Silesian Regional Assembly of the 4th term.

He then joined the Law and Justice party. In 2011, he applied unsuccessfully for the Senate's mandate. In 2014, he was a candidate of Law and Justice in the elections for the office of President of Częstochowa, but he was not elected to this seat. In the parliamentary election in 2015, he was once again from the PiS party to the Senate from the district of Częstochowa, this time obtaining the mandate of a senator.

In 2018 he was once again the candidate of his party for the presidency of Częstochowa in the local elections, but he did not get a choice for this function.

In 2019 he lost the mandate of a senator in the district of Częstochowa.
