= 2002 Polish local elections =

2002 Polish regional assembly election
← 1998	27 October 2002 (first round); 10 November 2002 (second round)	2006 →

561 seats to regional assemblies
- Registered: 29,572,213
- Turnout: 13,078,372 (44.23%) ▼1.12pp
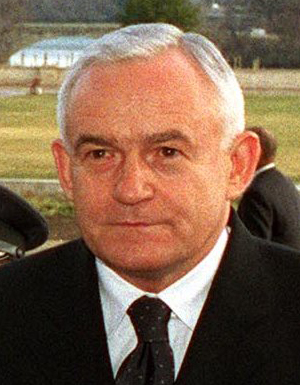

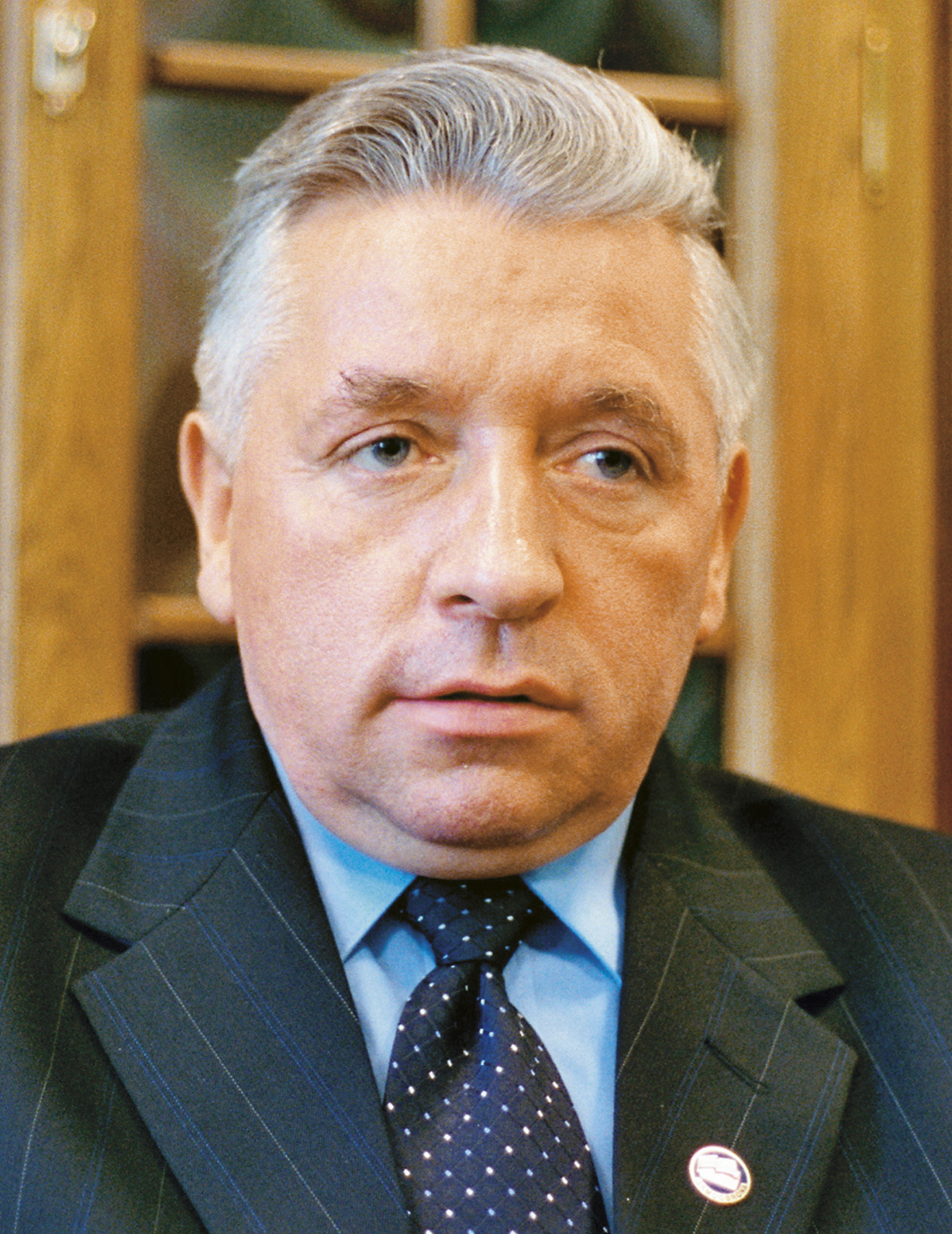

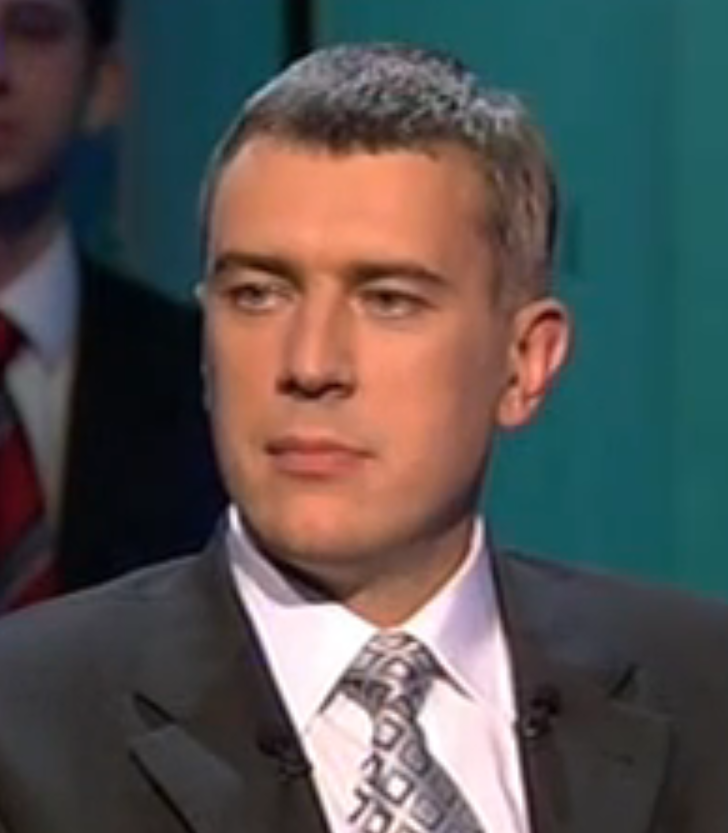

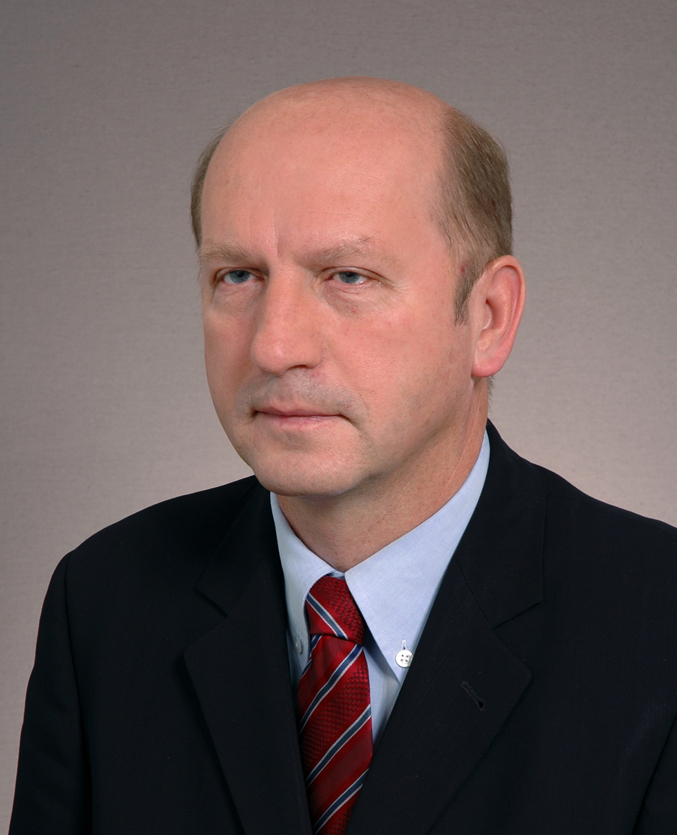

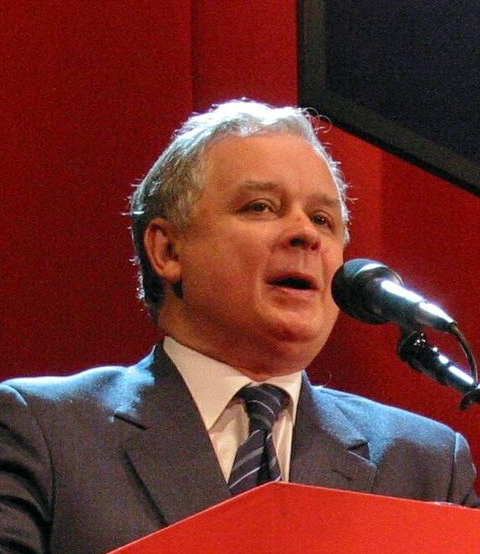

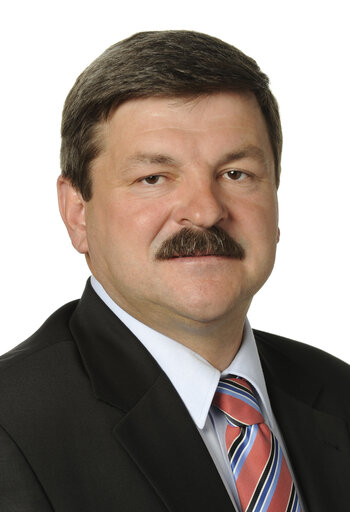

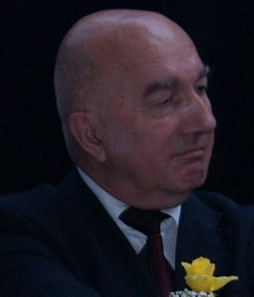
	First party	Second party	Third party
Leader	Leszek Miller	Andrzej Lepper	Roman Giertych
Party	SLD-UP	SRP	LPR
Leader since	1 July 1999	10 January 1992	26 January 2002 (Note: De facto leader of the party, while Marek Kotlinowski was the party president. Giertych was also the president of the party congress since 2002.)
Last election	31.8%, 329 seats	12.0%, 89 seats (Note: As Social Alliance.)	Did not exist
Seats won	189	101	92
Seat change	▼140	▲12	Did not exist
Popular vote	2,752,318	1,784,610	1,603,081
Percentage	24.7%	16.0%	14.4%
Swing	▼7.1pp	▲4.0pp	Did not exist
	Fourth party	Fifth party	Sixth party
Leader	Maciej Płażyński; Lech Kaczyński	Jarosław Kalinowski	Henryk Kroll
Party	POPiS	PSL	MN
Leader since	2002	11 October 1997	23 March 1991
Last election	Did not exist	12.0%, 89 seats	0.6%, 7 seats
Seats won	79	58	7
Seat change	Did not exist	▼31	0
Popular vote	1,351,856	1,207,161	54,385
Percentage	12.1%	10.8%	0.5%
Swing	Did not exist	▼1.2pp	▼0.1pp
- Result of the voivodeship sejmik elections

The 2002 Polish local elections were held in two parts, with the first round on 27 October and the second on 10 November 2002. All 16 provincial voivodeship sejmiks, 314 powiat county councils, 2,748 Gmina municipal councils, and town and city mayors were up for election. The event was the first of its kind to allow direct elections for mayors of municipalities. The local polls followed one year after the decisive victory of the Democratic Left Alliance in the 2001 parliamentary elections and were seen as a test of the popularity of the Democratic Left Alliance and Polish People's Party coalition government under Prime Minister Leszek Miller.

== Voivodship councils ==
Electoral committee	% of seats	Seats
Democratic Left Alliance-Labour Union (SLD-UP)	33.70%	189
Self-Defense of the Republic of Poland (SRP)	18.00%	101
Civic Platform-Law and Justice (POPiS)	14.08%	79
League of Polish Families (LPR)	16.40%	92
Polish People's Party (PSL)	10.34%	58
Solidarity Electoral Action (AWS) and affiliated groups	3.03%	17
Law and Justice (PiS) (Note: Ran individually in the Mazovian Voivodeship.)	1.78%	10
German Minority (MN)	1.25%	7
Civic Platform (PO)	0.89%	5
Self-Governance Union (UW)	0.53%	3
Total	100.00%	561

Party	Votes	%	Seats
Democratic Left Alliance – Labor Union	2,752,318	24.65	189
Self-Defence of the Republic of Poland	1,784,610	15.98	101
League of Polish Families	1,603,081	14.36	92
Civic Platform – Law and Justice Coalition Committee	1,351,856	12.11	79
Polish People's Party	1,207,161	10.81	58
Law and Justice	261,983	2.35	10
Confederation Movement for Defending the Unemployed	261,633	2.34	0
Self-Governance Union	256,012	2.29	3
Real Politics Union	254,013	2.27	0
Alternative Labour Party	167,349	1.50	0
Małopolska Community	135,424	1.21	6
Civic Platform	127,828	1.14	5
National Party of Retirees and Pensioners	127,299	1.14	0
Together Poland	121,841	1.09	0
Podkarpacie Together	106,504	0.95	7
Self-Governing Community of the Silesian Voivodeship	99,741	0.89	4
Anticlerical Poland	94,614	0.85	0
Silesian Autonomy Movement	56,632	0.51	0
German Minority	54,385	0.49	7
2002 Community	50,405	0.45	0
Social Initiative Self-Governance Community	38,297	0.34	0
Lesser Polish Forum of Women	34,100	0.31	0
Confederation of Independent Poland	29,406	0.26	0
Germans of Upper Silesia	20,412	0.18	0
Truth and Common Good	19,802	0.18	0
Our Podlasie	17,157	0.15	0
Belarusian Electoral Committee	15,544	0.14	0
Polish Economic Union	12,406	0.11	0
OPTIMAL	8,498	0.08	0
Defence of Podlasie	6,985	0.06	0
Defence of Polish Land	6,728	0.06	0
Peasants Together	6,565	0.06	0
Greens of the Republic of Poland	4,788	0.04	0
Association for the Help of Children in Gmina Gogolin	4,456	0.04	0
Driving Instructor's Association	4,073	0.04	0
Front for Włocławek	3,985	0.04	0
Common Initiative - Poland Podlasie	3,867	0.03	0
National Alliance of Retirees and Pensioners	3,415	0.03	0
Self-Governance Agreement of Powiats	3,135	0.03	0
Family	2,986	0.03	0
Entrepreneurship of the 21st Century	2,986	0.03	0
Alicja Wojciechowska Committee	2,971	0.03	0
Committee of Growth for Sierpc and the Powiat	2,675	0.02	0
Z. Krzeszowski Committee	2,659	0.02	0
KW Stowarzyszenia Śląska Liga Walki z Rakiem	2,633	0.02	0
Organisation of the Polish Nation	2,559	0.02	0
Rzeczpospolita Babska	2,496	0.02	0
Active Women	2,495	0.02	0
Tczew Powiat - Alternative 2002	2,433	0.02	0
Grażyna Kutzner Committee - Supporters of Law and Order	2,389	0.02	0
Committee in Service of Wielkopolans	2,298	0.02	0
Railwaymens' Association	2,061	0.02	0
Wałowski Committee	1,792	0.02	0
Kuyavian Citizen's Association "Our Region"	1,753	0.02	0
Małopolska Right-wing	1,461	0.01	0
Independents in the 2002 elections	1,412	0.01	0
KW Fundacja Promocji Twórców Kultury i Sztuki im. A. Zauchy	1,393	0.01	0
Right for the Republic	1,161	0.01	0
Forum of Retirees and Pensioners	1,055	0.01	0
Opportunity for Poor Poles Truth and Labor	982	0.01	0
Citizen's Union	921	0.01	0
Self-Governing League of Ziemia Jastrzębska	841	0.01	0
Truth - List of Irena Puciłowska	781	0.01	0
Total	11,165,501	100.00	561
Valid votes	11,165,501	85.37	
Invalid/blank votes	1,912,871	14.63	
Total votes	13,078,372	100.00	
Registered voters/turnout	29,572,213	44.23	
Source: National Electoral Commission
