= Medical University of Silesia =

Medical school in Katowice, Poland

Coordinates: 50°13′29.84″N 18°57′13.21″E

Medical University of Silesia in Katowice
- Śląski Uniwersytet Medyczny w Katowicach
- Latin: Universitas Medica Silesiensis
- Type: Public
- Established: March 20, 1948
- Rector: prof. dr hab. n. med. Tomasz Szczepański
- Academic staff: 1,201
- Administrative staff: 2,272
- Students: 10,203 (12.2023)
- Address: ul. Józefa Poniatowskiego 15, 40–055 Kato, Katowice, Poland
- Website: http://www.sum.edu.pl

The Medical University of Silesia (Polish: Śląski Uniwersytet Medyczny) is a university located in Katowice, Poland.

The university has 10,218 students and a teaching staff of 1201, including 295 professors. There are five faculties: Medicine, Dentistry, Pharmacy, Public Health, Health Sciences (includes degrees in nursing, physical therapy, dietetics). The English divisions in the Faculties of Medicine and Dentistry have 517 and 57 students, respectively.

== History ==
The university was established as the Akademia Lekarska (English: Medical Academy) upon its establishment on March 20, 1948 in Bytom. The name was officially changed to Śląska Akademia Medyczna im. Ludwika Waryńskiego (English: Ludwik Waryński Silesian Medical Academy) in March 1950.

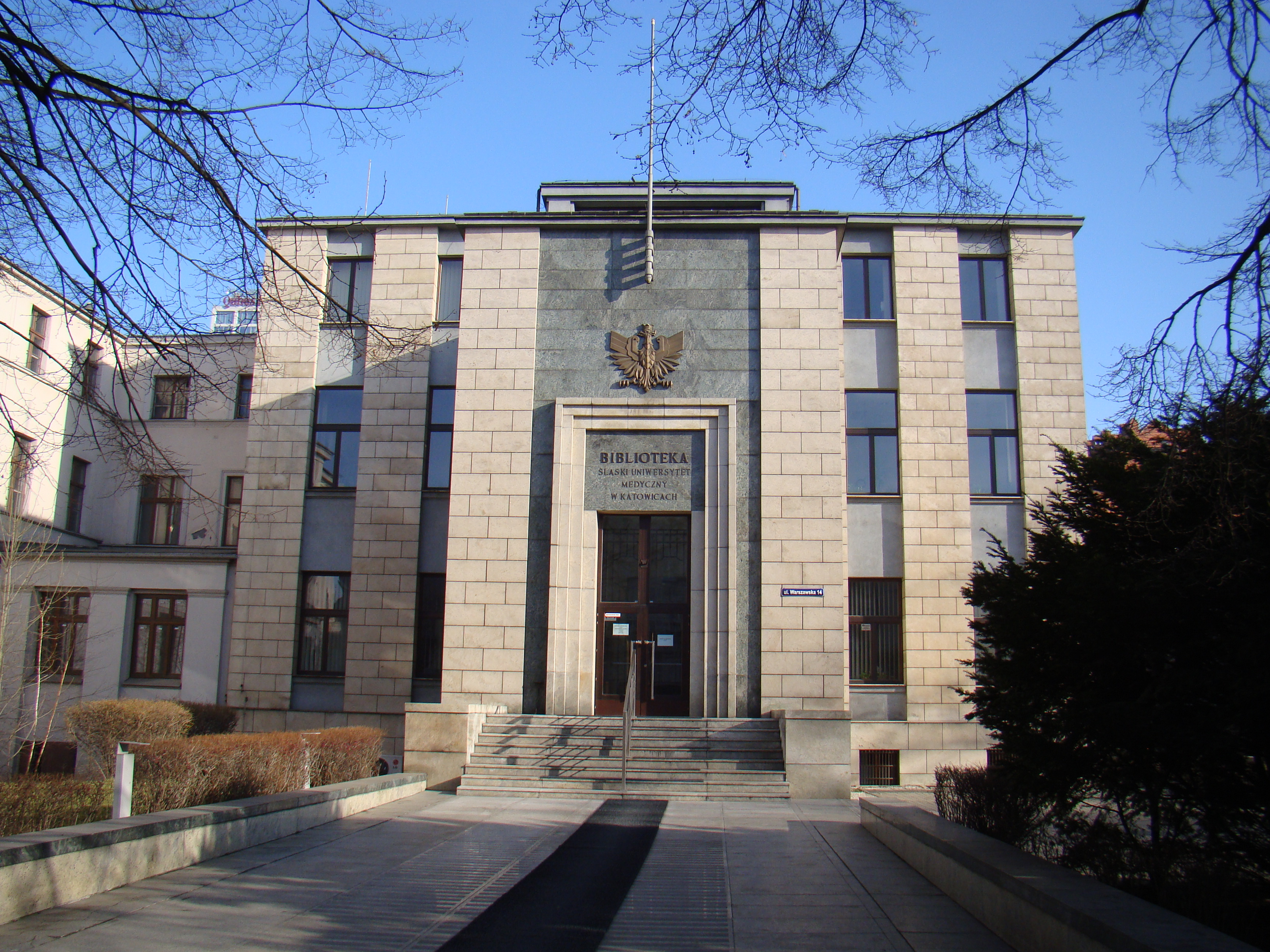
Medical University of Silesia main building

The university's first rector and one of its key founders was epidemiologist Professor Brunon Nowakowski. During the first decade of the life of the school, four towns were considered as its possible seats, namely Rokitnica, Zabrze, Bytom and Katowice. In December 1957 the Regional Council a passed decree establishing the ultimate location of the school in Katowice.

In 1971 the Faculty of Pharmacy was established with majors in pharmacy, medical analytics, and environmental bioanalysis (the latter since 1978). In 1974 the Central Teaching Hospital in Katowice-Ligota started admitting patients. Also, the Nursing Faculty in Katowice-Ligota was established, which awards a master's degree in nursing (in 1990 the faculty was changed into a division of the Katowice Medical Faculty and in 2002 was included in the Faculty of Health Care and Education).

In 1975 the Clinical Teaching Center was opened in Tychy, and the second Medical Faculty was established in Katowice-Ligota. In the same year the Interdepartmental Institute of Anesthesiology and Resuscitation was established (presently, Department of Anesthesiology and Intensive Care). In 1977 the Polish Institute of Ophthalmology was established as a Department of the Medical Faculty in Katowice.

In 1996 the university was accredited by United States Department of Education and an English language division was established. The university has since obtained accreditation from all 50 states' medical boards, most recently California. The inaugural class consisted of a handful of students from the United States and the division now includes 517 students from countries in seven continents, most commonly the United States, Sweden, Norway, the United Kingdom, Israel, and Saudi Arabia and South Africa . A chapter of the American Medical Students Association (AMSA) was established by the division's students in 2002. The division's Israeli students have the option of completing their final two years of study in Barzilai Medical Center in Ashkelon, Israel.

In 1998, the Zabrze-Gliwice Medical Complex was founded.

In 2002 the Faculty of Public Health and Faculty of Health Care and Education were established and the Faculty of Public Health was founded.

The Sejm of the Republic of Poland granted university status on March 30, 2007 and the current name has been used since its official chance on June 20, 2007.
