= Tadeusz Wrona (politician) =

Polish politician

Tadeusz Stanisław Wrona

Mayor of Częstochowa
- In office 19 November 2002 – 18 November 2009
- Preceded by: Wiesław Maras
- Succeeded by: Piotr Kurpios (Acting)

Mayor of Częstochowa
- In office 18 June 1990 – 3 November 1995
- Preceded by: Wiesław Brągoszewski (PZPR)
- Succeeded by: Halina Rozpondek

Personal details
- Born: 26 March 1951 (age 75) Szczecin, Poland
- Party: Independent

Tadeusz Stanisław Wrona (born 26 March 1951 in Szczecin) is a Polish politician, local official, President of Częstochowa (1990-1995 and 2002–2009), Member of the Polish Parliament (1997–2001). In 2010 counselor of Lech Kaczyński.

== Biography ==
Wrona graduated from Henryk Sienkiewicz High School in Częstochowa and in 1974 from the Częstochowa Polytechnic. In 1982 he earned a doctorate in engineering, then worked in the Polytechnic until 1990 and again from 1996 to 1997.

In 1980 he was co-founder of the Solidarity movement at the Polytechnic. From 18 June 1990 to 3 November 1995 he was mayor of Częstochowa and member of City Council (1990–1998). From 1997 to 2001 he was a member of the national Sejm.

In 2002 he again became mayor of Częstochowa and was re-elected in 2006. In 2009 a group of citizens tried to change the mayor by petition, and as a result of a referendum, he was dismissed.

In 2010 he was again a candidate in local elections but didn't become mayor; he did become a member of City Council. In 2011 he started work with the Supreme Audit Office (Najwyższa Izba Kontroli) and resigned his seat on City Council.

== Political views ==
He is strongly associated with right-wing parties such as AWS or PiS. He created in Częstochowa his local social initiative - the Local Government Community, referred to as the center-right organization, from which he left in 2011.

He was repeatedly criticized for his attachment to Jasna Góra and the Catholic Church - inhabitants accused him of taking more care of the interests of the church than the residents. This was the main argument of his opponents during the referendum on his dismiss.
