= Częstochowa City Council =

Governing body of Częstochowa, Poland

Częstochowa City Council Rada Miasta Częstochowy

Type
- Type: Unicameral

Leadership
- Chairman: Łukasz Banaś, KO
- Vice-Chairwomen: Małgorzata Iżyńska, L Monika Pohorecka, PiS; Marta Salwierak, KO

Structure
- Seats: 25
- Political groups: Mayoral coalition (15): Civic Coalition (8); The Left (6); Independent (1); Opposition (10): Law and Justice (9); Independent (1)

Elections
- Voting system: Multi-member electoral districts with five-year terms
- Last election: 7 April 2024

Website
- bip.czestochowa.pl/artykuly/71369/rada-miasta

Częstochowa City Council (Polish: Rada Miasta Częstochowy) is a unicameral governing body of the city of Częstochowa, the second biggest city in Silesian Voivodeship. It consists of 28 councilors elected in free elections for a five-year term (since 2018). The current chairman of the council is Zdzisław Wolski (SLD).

== Election results ==
Political groups of the Częstochowa City Council after 2018 elections

Political groups of the Częstochowa City Council after 2014 elections

Political groups of the Częstochowa City Council after 2010 elections

Political groups of the Częstochowa City Council after 2006 elections

Political groups of the Częstochowa City Council after 2002 elections

=== 2024 ===
All seats on the city council were being contested in the 2024 election. The number of seats was lowered from 28 to 25.

Party	Votes	%	+/–	Seats	+/–
Law and Justice	21,967	27.39	▲1.35	9	▼1
Civic Coalition	18,326	22.85	▲6.87	7	▲2
The Left	15,768	19.66	▼13.14	6	▼6
Third Way	8,043	10.03	New	2	New
In Common for Częstochowa Krzysztof Matyjaszczyk	6,196	7.72	▼1.05	1	Steady
Alternative for Częstochowa	5,555	6.93	New	0	New
I Choose Częstochowa!	3,786	4.72	New	0	New
Association Democratic RP	569	0.71	New	0	New
Total	80,210	100.00	–	25	▼3
Source: National Electoral Commission

=== 2018 ===
All 28 seats on the city council were being contested in the 2018 election.

Częstochowa City Council Elections, 2018
Party	Votes			Seats		
Party	No.	%	+/−	No.	+/−	%
Democratic Left Alliance	31,998	32.80	▲6.21	12	▲3	42.86
Law and Justice	25,407	26.04	▼3.72	10	Steady	35.71
Civic Coalition	15,589	15.98	▼1.67	5	Steady	17.86
Together for Częstochowa	8,554	8.77	New	1	New	3.57
Marcin Maranda.Citizens of Częstochowa	7,479	7.67	▼6.02	0	▼4	0
Kukiz'15	6,601	6.77	New	0	New	0
Open Częstochowa	1,000	1.02	New	0	New	0
Senior 500+	936	0.96	New	0	New	0

=== 2014 ===
All 28 seats on the city council were being contested in the 2014 election.

Częstochowa City Council Elections, 2014
Party	Votes			Seats		
Party	No.	%	+/−	No.	+/−	%
Law and Justice	21,512	29.76	▲13.18	10	▲5	35.71
SLD Left Together	19,222	26.59	▼5.06	9	▼1	32.14
Civic Platform	12,755	17.65	▼9.07	5	▼4	17.86
Citizens of Częstochowa	9,893	13.69	▼3.03	4	Steady	14.29
Polish People's Party	4,687	6.48	New	0	New	0
New Right – Janusz Korwin-Mikke	2,587	3.58	New	0	New	0
Free City Częstochowa	1,627	2.25	New	0	New	0

=== 2010 ===
All 28 seats on the city council were being contested in the 2010 election.

Częstochowa City Council Elections, 2010
Party	Votes			Seats		
Party	No.	%	+/−	No.	+/−	%
Democratic Left Alliance	23,751	31.65	▲8.92	10	▲3	35.71
Civic Platform	20,050	26.72	▲1.04	9	▲1	32.14
Self-government Cooperative	12,542	16.72	▼6.09	4	▼3	14.29
Law and Justice	12,439	16.58	▼1.50	5	▼1	17.86
Civic Block Częstochowianie	2,603	3.47	New	0	New	0
New Częstochowa	2,357	3.14	New	0	New	0
Nationwide Association of Retirees and Pensioners	1,159	1.54	▼0.39	0	Steady	0
Agreement Independents	131	0.17	New	0	New	0

=== 2006 ===
All 28 seats on the city council were being contested in the 2006 election.

Częstochowa City Council Elections, 2006
Party	Votes			Seats		
Party	No.	%	+/−	No.	+/−	%
Civic Platform	17,940	25.68	New	8	New	28.57
Self-government Cooperative of Tadeusz Wrona	15,936	22.81	▼0.40	7	▼2	25.00
SLD+SDPL+PD+UP Left and Democrats	15,879	22.73	▼8.49	7	▼7	25.00
Law and Justice	12,634	18.08	▲4.86	6	▲1	21.43
League of Polish Families	2,585	3.70	▼2.34	0	Steady	0
Now Częstochowa	1,773	2.54	New	0	New	0
Nationwide Association of Retirees and Pensioners	1,350	1.93	▲1.47	0	Steady	0
Self-Defence of the Republic of Poland	1,157	1.66	▼5.15	0	Steady	0
Civic Agreement of the Left	549	0.79	New	0	New	0
Our Beautiful City	60	0.09	New	0	New	0

=== 2002 ===
All 28 seats on the city council were being contested in the 2002 election.

Częstochowa City Council Elections, 2002
Party	Votes			Seats		
Party	No.	%	+/−	No.	+/−	%
Democratic Left Alliance – Labour Union	17,344	31.22		14		50.00
Self-government Cooperative "Community"	12,890	23.21		9		32.14
Supporters of Law and Justice	7,342	13.22		5		17.86
Voivodeship Częstochowa	3,793	6.83		0		0
Self-Defence of the Republic of Poland	3,783	6.81		0		0
Union for Częstochowa	3,522	6.34		0		0
League of Polish Families	3,355	6.04		0		0
Polish Economic Union	1,016	1.83		0		0
Defense of Tenant and Public Trust	690	1.24		0		0
Work and Dignity	630	1.13		0		0
Time of the Young	627	1.13		0		0
Citizens Strong Together	298	0.54		0		0
Nationwide Association of Retirees and Pensioners	256	0.46		0		0

== See also ==
- History of Częstochowa
- List of mayors of Częstochowa
