= Silesian Voivodeship Sejmik =

Regional Legislature in Poland

Silesian Voivodeship Sejmik Sejmik Województwa Śląskiego

Type
- Type: Unicameral

Leadership
- Chairperson: Jacek Jarco, PL2050
- Vice-Chairpersons: Stanisław Gmitruk, PSL; Mirosław Mazur, KO; Alina Bednarz, KO
- Marshal: Wojciech Saługa, KO

Structure
- Seats: 45 councillors
- Political groups: Executive board (27): KO (20); PSL (3); Unaffiliated (Note: As grouped by councillors' club affiliation) (4); PL2050 (2); NL (2); Opposition (18): PiS (18)

Elections
- Last election: 7 April 2024

Meeting place
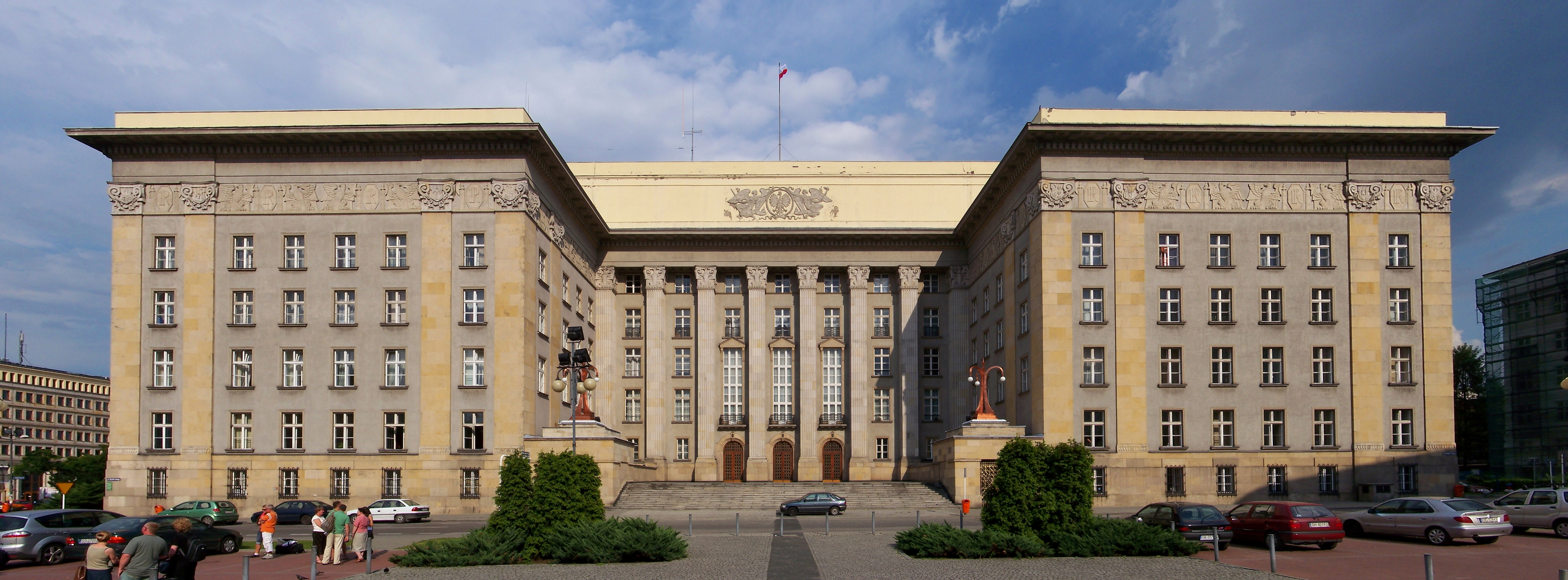
- Silesian Parliament Building, Katowice

Website
- Silesian Regional Assembly

The Silesian Voivodeship Sejmik (Polish: Sejmik Województwa Śląskiego) is the regional legislature of the Voivodeship of Silesia in Poland. It is a unicameral parliamentary body consisting of forty-five councillors elected for a five-year term. The current chairperson of the assembly is Jacek Jarco of PL2050.

The assembly elects the executive board that acts as the collective executive for the regional government, headed by the voivodeship marshal. The current Executive Board of Silesia is a coalition government between Civic Coalition, Third Way and The Left, with Wojciech Saługa of the Civic Coalition presiding as marshal.

The Silesian Assembly convenes in the Silesian Parliament building in Katowice.

== Districts ==
Members of the assembly are elected from seven districts and serve five-year terms. Districts do not have formal names. Instead, each constituency has a number and territorial description.

Number	Seats	City counties	Land counties
1	7	Bielsko-Biała	Bielsko, Cieszyn, Żywiec
2	6	Katowice, Mysłowice, Tychy	Bieruń-Lędziny, Pszczyna
3	7	Jastrzębie-Zdrój, Rybnik, Żory	Mikołów, Racibórz, Rybnik, Wodzisław
4	7	Bytom, Gliwice	Gliwice, Lubliniec, Tarnowskie Góry
5	6	Chorzów, Piekary Śląskie, Ruda Śląska, Siemianowice Śląskie, Świętochłowice, Zabrze	None
6	5	Częstochowa	Częstochowa, Kłobuck, Myszków
7	7	Dąbrowa Górnicza, Jaworzno, Sosnowiec	Będzin, Zawiercie

== Composition ==
=== 1998 ===
First Silesian Regional Assembly

Political groups	Mandates
Solidarity Electoral Action	31
Democratic Left Alliance	31
Freedom Union	12
Social Alliance (Poland)	1
Total	75

=== 2002 ===
Political groups	Mandates
Democratic Left Alliance - Labour Union	20
Civic Platform - Law and Justice	10
League of Polish Families	7
Self-Defence of the Republic of Poland	6
Wspólnota Samorządowa Województwa Śląskiego	4
Self-Governance Union	1
Total	48

=== 2006 ===
2006 Silesian Regional Assembly

Political groups	Mandates
Civic Platform	21
Law and Justice	16
Left and Democrats	8
Polish People's Party	3
Total	48

=== 2010 ===
2010 Silesian Regional Assembly

Political groups	Mandates
Civic Platform	22
Law and Justice	11
Democratic Left Alliance	10
Silesian Autonomy Movement	3
Polish People's Party	2
Total	48

=== 2014 ===
2014 Silesian Regional Assembly

Political groups	Mandates
Civic Platform	17
Law and Justice	16
Polish People's Party	5
Silesian Autonomy Movement	4
SLD Left Together	3
Total	45

=== 2018 ===
2018 Silesian Regional Assembly

Political groups	Mandates
Law and Justice	22
Civic Coalition	20
SLD Left Together	2
Polish People's Party	1
Total	45

=== 2024 ===
2024 Silesian Regional Assembly

Political groups	Mandates
Civic Coalition	20
Law and Justice	18
Third Way	1
The Left	2
Total	45

== See also ==
- Polish Regional Assembly
- Silesian Voivodeship
