= List of ambassadors of Poland to the United States =

Ambassador of the Republic of Poland to the United States
- Ambasador Rzeczypospolitej Polskiej w Stanach Zjednoczonych
- Coat of arms of Poland

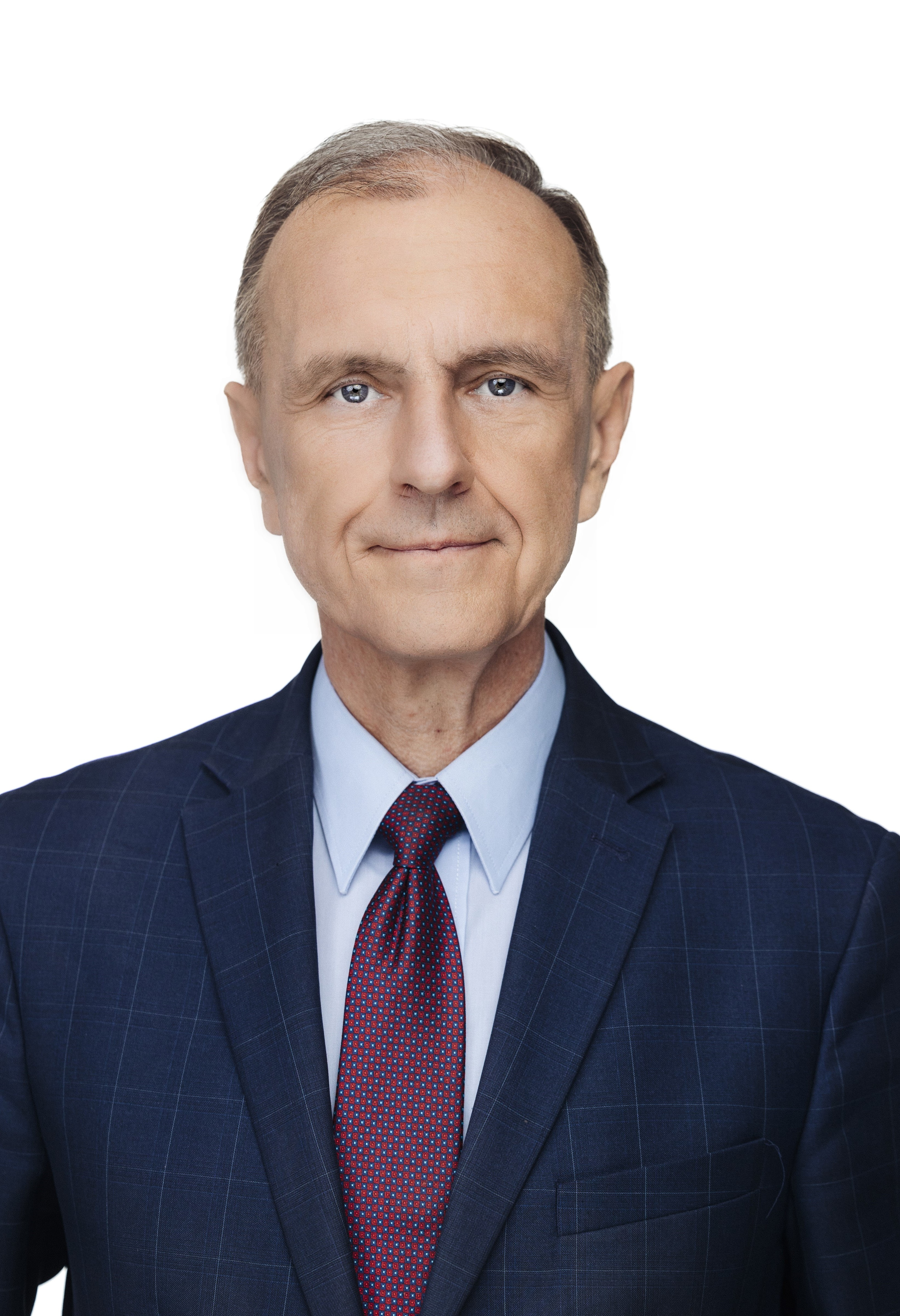
- Incumbent; Bogdan Klich; Chargé d'affaires ad interim since 18 November 2024
- Embassy of Poland in Washington, D.C.
- Style: Mr. Ambassador (informal); His Excellency (diplomatic)
- Reports to: Minister of Foreign Affairs
- Seat: Washington, D.C., United States
- Appointer: President of Poland
- Term length: No fixed term
- Formation: 1919
- Website: www.gov.pl/web/usa

The Poland Ambassador to the United States (officially the Ambassador Extraordinary and Plenipotentiary of the Republic of Poland to the United States) is the official representative of the government of the Poland to the government of the United States.

== History ==
The first permanent Polish diplomatic mission was created in late 18th century by the last king of Poland, Stanislaus Augustus. After partitions of Poland, there was over a century gap in diplomatic relations. The mission was re-established following Poland regaining independence in the aftermath of World War I.

== List of ambassadors ==
=== Second Polish Republic ===
Note: Second Republic was created in 1918.

1. 1919–1922: Kazimierz Lubomirski (envoy)
2. 1923–1925: Władysław Wróblewski (envoy)
3. 1925–1929: Jan Ciechanowski (envoy)
4. 1929–1932: Tytus Filipowicz (Ambassador beginning in 1930)
5. 1932–1933: Władysław Sokołowski (chargé d'affaires)
6. 1933–1935: Stanisław Patek
7. 1935–1936: Władysław Sokołowski (chargé d'affaires)
8. 1936–1940: Jerzy Antoni Potocki
9. 1940–1945: Jan Ciechanowski
10. 1945–1945: Janusz Żółtowski (chargé d'affaires)

=== Polish People's Republic ===
Note: Officially, Polish People's Republic is the name used since 1952. Unofficially, this name is used for all Polish communist governments since 1944.

1. 1945–1947 – Oskar Lange
2. 1947–1955 – Józef Winiewicz
3. 1955–1961 – Romuald Spasowski
4. 1961–1967 – Edward Drożniak
5. 1967–1972 – Jerzy Michałowski
6. 1972–1977 – Witold Trąmpczyński
7. 1978–1982 – Romuald Spasowski
8. 1982–1988 – Zdzisław Ludwiczak (chargé d’affaires)
9. 1988–1990 – Jan Kinast

=== Third Polish Republic ===
Note: modern Poland.

1. 1990–1993: Kazimierz Dziewanowski
2. 1993–1994: Maciej Kozłowski (chargé d'affaires)
3. 1994–2000: Jerzy Koźmiński
4. 2000–2005: Przemysław Grudziński
5. 2005–2007: Janusz Reiter
6. 2008–2012: Robert Kupiecki
7. 2012–2016: Ryszard Schnepf
8. 2016–2021: Piotr Wilczek
9. 2021–2024: Marek Magierowski
10. since 2024: Bogdan Klich (chargé d'affaires)

== See also ==
- List of ambassadors of the United States to Poland
- Poland–United States relations
