= Marta Salwierak =

Polish politician

Councilor of the Silesian Regional Assembly
- Incumbent
- Assumed office 2014

Personal details
- Born: 27 April 1984 (age 42) Częstochowa
- Party: Civic Platform
- Education: Jan Długosz University
- Occupation: economist, manager, local official, politician

Marta Salwierak (born April 27, 1984 in Blachownia) – is a Polish politician, local official, economist and manager.

== Biography ==
She graduated from the Faculty of Management at the Jan Długosz University and finished WSL in Częstochowa.

She is a member of Civic Platform. From 2010 to 2014 she was a councilor in the Częstochowa City Council. In 2014 local elections she successfully applied for the mandate of the councilor of the Silesian Regional Assembly. In 2015 parliamentary elections she started without success to the Sejm from Częstochowa district. In 2018 local elections she successfully applied for re-election to the regional council.
