= Jan Kobylański =

Polish-Paraguayan businessman (1923–2019)

- Born: 23 July 1923; Równe, Poland
- Died: 27 March 2019 (aged 95); Montevideo, Uruguay
- Occupation: businessman
- Known for: honorary consul
- Father: Stanisław Kobylański

Jan Kobylański (21 July 1923, Równe, Poland – 27 March 2019, Montevideo, Uruguay) was a Polish-Paraguayan businessman. He was the founder of the Union of Polish Associations and Organizations in Latin America (pol. Unia Stowarzyszeń i Organizacji Polskich w Ameryce Łacińskiej, USOPAŁ) the largest Polish immigrant organization of South America. He was also a founder of one of the world's largest companies involved in editing postage stamps, and coins mintage. He has written books on philately, as well as on the mediation policy of the Roman Curia. He was formerly the honorary consul of Poland to Paraguay, and the honorary consul of Paraguay to Santa Cruz de Tenerife, Spain.

== Biography ==
Kobylański was the son of Polish attorney at law Stanisław Kobylański. In 1943 he was arrested by the Nazis, and imprisoned at Warsaw's infamous Pawiak prison. He was a prisoner in the German concentration camps Mauthausen and Gross Rosen. After World War II, he moved to Italy, where he produced toothbrushes, and sold kitchen appliances. He became co-owner of the Astral Metal Technica company in Milan.

In 1952, he arrived in Paraguay, taking advantage of President Federico Chaves' immigration program, which allowed 18,000 families from Europe to settle in that country. Soon he won a contract to import kitchen appliances, and another to print postage stamps for the National Postal Service. In the next few years, he developed one of the world's largest stamp printing and coin minting companies.

According to Polish journalists Jerzy Morawski and Mikołaj Lizut, Kobylański had a good relationship with Paraguayan president, General Alfredo Stroessner. Kobylański, however, denies this.

From 1989 to 2000, Kobylański was an honorary Polish consul in Argentina. He was removed from office by the Polish minister of foreign affairs Władysław Bartoszewski, after former Polish ambassador Jarosław Gugała to Uruguay and Costa Rica accused Kobylański of antisemitism and of acting against Polish interests. Right wing Polish senators Jan Szafraniec, Ryszard Bender and Czesław Ryszka have since spoken up in his defence. He is a longtime sponsor of privately owned broadcast station Radio Maryja in Poland.

Kobylański helped to establish 8 June as the "Day of the Polish Settler in Argentina". He helped to fund monuments to John Paul II in Buenos Aires and Montevideo, as well as a monument to Frédéric Chopin in Punta del Este. He is a sponsor and patron of an elementary school in the region of Podlasie in Poland.

== Awards ==
In 1995 Kobylański was awarded with the Krzyż Oświęcimski.

== Accusations ==
In 2004, a reporter for Gazeta Wyborcza, Mikołaj Lizut, accused Kobylański of collaborating with the Nazis when Poland was occupied by German forces during World War II, which Kobylański denies. In 2005, the allegations were repeated by a columnist for Rzeczpospolita, Jerzy Morawski. In 2004, the investigative section of the Instytut Pamięci Narodowej (IPN) began legal proceedings to determine if the accusations of handling over a Jewish family named Szenker to the Gestapo were true. A person named Janusz Kobylański was supposedly involved.

In April 2006 the chief of the investigative section of the IPN, Witold Kulesza, reported: "so far, we have not found any evidence of the charges that... Jan Kobylański, handed over to the Germans a married Jewish couple."

In January 2007, the section of IPN in Warsaw reported that it had refused to re-open the investigation. In his explanation, the leading prosecutor recalled the testimonies of witnesses who decided not to testify against Kobylański:

In the winter of 1942-1943 Leokadia Sarnowska met Janusz Kobylański (...) During the conversation Janusz Kobylański said, that he was earning money producing false documents for Jews trying to hide themselves. Sarnowska soon sent the Szenker family to Kobylański, which consisted of three people - a married couple and their relative (...) Leokadia Sarnowska arranged the meeting of the two parties, during which Janusz Kobylański told Sarnowska and the Szenkers that false identity documents would be delivered for a certain sum of dollars in gold. The money was delivered to Judge Stanisław Juński, known to Sarnowska, who promised to give them to Kobylański after he delivered the money. Some days after the meeting Kobylański called Sarnowska and said, that the Szenker family had been arrested, and probably executed by the Germans, so he had to destroy the false documents that he had prepared.

Kobylański informed Sarnowska that Judge Juński, on the request of one of Szenkers, handed the money over to a "Polish policeman". Then Kobylański demanded payment from Sarnowska under threat of calling the Germans. Sarnowska delivered a part of the sum to Kobylański at once, and the second part was sent to an office of the father of Janusz Kobylański, att. Stanisław Kobylański (...) After some time one of the Szenker family called Judge Juński, and asked to arrange a meeting with Sarnowska, who immediately came to Warsaw to meet Szenker. Szenker told her that Kobylański denounced them to the Gestapo. According to his version, Gestapo officers went to the hostel where he stayed with his family, and showed him his personal notes, which he handed to Kobylański, hoping that it would help in the preparation of false documents. The Gestapo men ordered a Polish policeman to escort the Szenkers to the ghetto. On their way, Szenker convinced the policeman that he should free them for the money held in the judge's office. Policeman took the money from Juński and freed the Szenkers.

Stanisław Kobylański worked in Warsaw as a lawyer for the remainder of his life. Jan Kobylański, however, escaped from Poland to Western Europe, probably in 1945.

According to documents collected by the Prosecutor's Office in Warsaw, the evidence that Jan Kobylański was the perpetrator in the denunciation of the Szenkers family cannot be proved. Legal proceedings against Stanisław Kobylański were denied, and those against Janusz Kobylański were suspended by the Regional Court in Warsaw on 31 June 1948. On April 19, 1955, prosecutors decided to cancel the case of Janusz Kobylański. Prosecutor Paweł Karolak of the IPN investigative section in Warsaw stated that his office was looking for evidence not only in Poland (archives, Museum of Auschwitz-Birkenau, Ministry of Foreign Affairs), but also in Germany (KL Gross-Rosen), Israel, and the United States as well. Furthermore, they found no evidence that "Janusz Kobylański" and "Jan Kobylański" were the same person.

In 2005, Mikołaj Lizut wrote in the Gazeta Wyborcza that Jan Kobylański falsified documents of the Red Cross, that he was a prisoner at Auschwitz, Mauthausen, Gusen, Gross Rosen, and Dachau concentration camps. Documents used by Kobylański, are different from those in the Auschwitz Museum.

In December 2007, the minister of Foreign Affairs, Radosław Sikorski, sent a message to Polish embassies abroad to discontinue contact with Kobylański. In late November 2008, two independent internet services reported that Kobylański was going to open a legal case against Polish politicians and journalists (among others against Adam Michnik, Jerzy Baczyński and Ryszard Schnepf) on charges of slander.
