= Beata Kocik =

Polish politician (born 1963)

Vice-Chairperson of the Silesian Regional Assembly
- Incumbent
- Assumed office November 21, 2018

Personal details
- Born: 30 June 1963 (age 63) Częstochowa
- Party: Law and Justice
- Education: Jan Długosz University
- Occupation: local official, politician

Beata Kocik (born June 30, 1963, in Częstochowa) – is a Polish politician and local official.

== Biography ==
She graduated from the Jan Długosz University. Kocik is a member of Law and Justice. She was a councilor from 2010 to 2014 in the Częstochowa City Council. In 2014 local elections she successfully applied for a seat in the Silesian Regional Assembly. In 2018 local elections she managed to get reelection, furthermore she was nominated to the office of vice-chairperson of the regional council in 2018.
