= Jarosław Gugała =

Polish journalist, actor, musician, diplomat

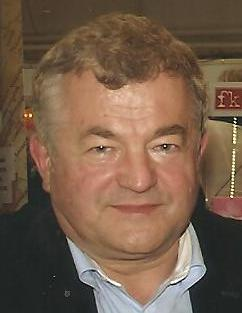

Poland Ambassador to Uruguay
- In office 1999–2003
- Preceded by: Ryszard Schnepf
- Succeeded by: Lech Kubiak

Personal details
- Born: 13 April 1959 (age 67) Młynary, Poland
- Education: University of Warsaw
- Profession: Journalist, actor, musician, university teacher, diplomat

Jarosław Rafał Gugała (born 13 April 1959, in Młynary) is a Polish radio and television journalist, actor, musician, university teacher, from 1999 to 2003 serving as an ambassador to Uruguay.

== Life ==
Gugała holds an M.A. in Hispanic Studies from the University of Warsaw. He also studied economics at the Warsaw School of Economics.

In 1983, he co-founded the band Zespół Reprezentacyjny and became its singer. The band was playing songs of different cultural heritages, e.g. Brazilian, Sefardic, by Lluís Llach, Georges Brassens.

In 1990, he joined news program Wiadomości (News) at TVP1 and started his career as a journalist and presenter. Between 1992 and 1995, he was director of the TVP1 and Television Information Agency.

In 1999, Gugała was appointed ambassador to Uruguay. Thanks to his reports to the Ministry of Foreign Affairs on Jan Kobylański's antisemitism it was possible to remove Kobylański from the office of honorary consul.

In 2003, Gugała ended his term in Montevideo and returned to his journalist profession. He started working for Polsat television channel, becoming host of the chief news program. In 2005, he was presented as a candidate for ambassadorial post in Cuba but did not receive an agrément. In 2008, he joined Polsat News. In 2010, he was carrying out a final debate of the presidential campaign between Bronisław Komorowski and Jarosław Kaczyński. From February 2011 to August 2012 he was holding the post of the head of the News and the Publications and Information Division.

He was working also for TOK FM radio station (2005–2007), TV4 television channel, Newsweek Polska as a columnist, University of Warsaw as a lecturer. Occasionally, he plays as a film actor.

In 2014, Gugała was awarded with the Officer's Cross of the Order of Polonia Restituta.

== Works ==
Books

- Gugała, Jarosław (2012). Doskonale a nawet gorzej : świat we mgle absurdu (in Polish). Warszawa: Wydawnictwo Albatros A. Kuryłowicz. p. 351. ISBN 9788376597522.

Music albums as Zespół Reprezentacyjny

- Za nami noc... (pieśni Lluisa Llacha) (1985)
- Śmierć za idee – ballady Georgesa Brassensa (1986)
- Sefarad (1991)
- Pornograf (1993)
- Kumple to grunt (2007)

Filmography

- Tylko strach, as TV presenter (1993)
- Gracze, as himself (1995)
- Persona non grata, as a passenger (2005)
- Agentki (2008)
- Pierwsza miłość, as himself (2012)
- Pakt, as a journalist (2016)
