= Maciej Ganczar =

Polish literary scholar and translator

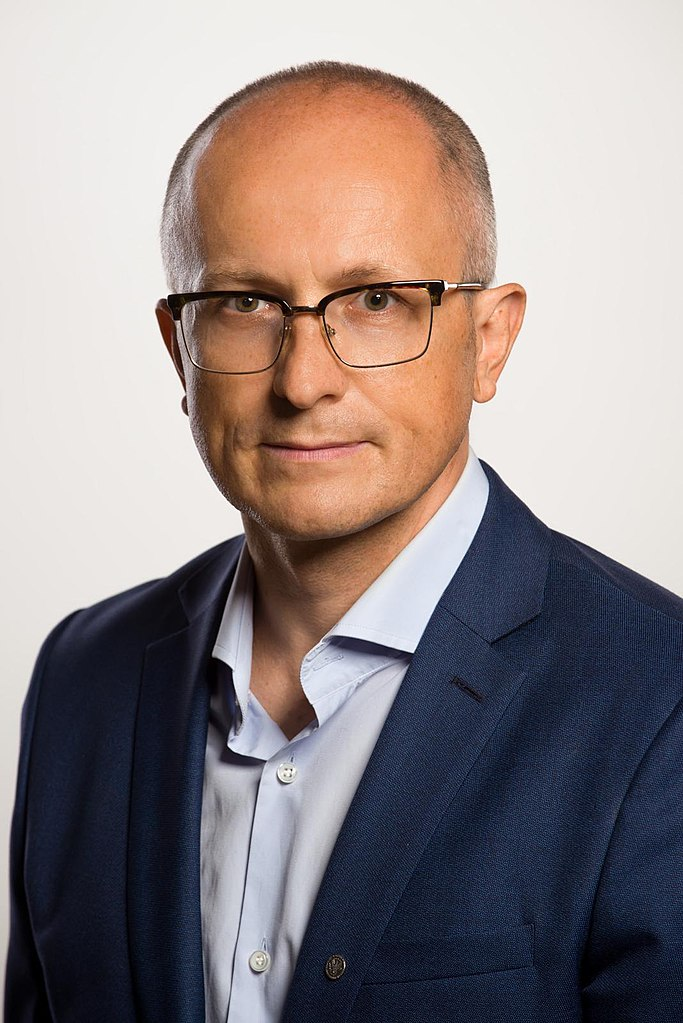
- Ganczar 2019
- Born: 19 January 1976; Łódź
- Education: Jan Długosz University; Szczecin University; University of Silesia
- Occupations: Literary scholar; Literary translator

Maciej Ganczar (born January 19, 1976, in Łódź) is a Polish literary scholar specializing in German literature, literary translator, author of publications for foreign language teaching, since 2024 Professor at the Medical University of Warsaw.

== Life ==
Maciej Ganczar was born on January 19, 1976, in Łódź, Poland, and he spent his childhood and youth in Piotrków Trybunalski, where he attended the Juliusz Słowacki 3rd Secondary School. He followed the course of German studies at the Jan Długosz University in Częstochowa, at the Szczecin University and finally at the University of Silesia, where he was awarded a doctoral degree in 2007. In 2020 he completed postgraduate studies in glottodidactics in the Institute of Literary Research of the Polish Academy of Sciences.

Since 2001 he has lectured at many universities, among others at the University of Warsaw, the Medical Academy in Warsaw (now: Medical University of Warsaw) and Università del Salento in Lecce (Italy). He is currently the Head of the Centre for Foreign Languages and the Head of the Premed College at the Medical University of Warsaw, as well as a coursebook expert in the Polish Ministry of Education. In 2023 he became part of the Medical Language Commission in the Council for the Polish Language at the Presidium of the Polish Academy of Sciences. A year later, he was appointed by the Polish Minister of Science to the State Commission for the Certification of Proficiency in Polish as a Foreign Language.

He is also active as an editor and translator of German literature, above all of theatrical plays. His translations include dramas by Marc Becker, Wilhelm Genazino, Kerstin Specht, Lukas Holliger, Wolfgang Sréter, Andrea M. Schenkel, Ödön von Horváth, Max Frisch, Rolf Hochhuth, Arthur Schnitzler and Hermann Broch.

Maciej Ganczar is also the editor of a scientific series devoted to links between medicine and the humanities ars medica ac humanitas and Noctes Medicae.

Since 2011 he has been a member of the International Hermann Broch’s Society in Washington. In the same year he was appointed Chairman of the Polish Literary Translators' Association and he held the position for two terms, until 2017. Since 2015 he is also a member of the BRISTOL Association of Polish and Foreign Teachers of Polish Culture and Polish as a Foreign Language, as well as of the Polish Association for Theatre Research. In 2019 he joined Open Republic – Association against Antisemitism and Xenophobia.

In 2016 he was awarded the Medal of the Commission of National Education.

== Works ==
=== Coursebooks (selected) ===
- Zasady polskiego nazewnictwa substancji czynnych produktów leczniczych, Warszawa: WUM 2025.
- Jak się pani dzisiaj czuje? Podręcznik do nauki medycznego języka polskiego jako obcego. Część 1. Poziom B1, Warszawa: PWN 2023.
- English-Polish and Polish-English Dictionary of Medical Terms, Warsaw: Medipage 2017.
- Historia literatury austriackiej [The History of Austrian Literature], Warsaw: PWN 2016.
- Romantische Künstlerfiguren in der Prosa von Peter Härtling, Frankfurt am Main: Peter Lang 2015.
- Niemiecki w praktyce ratownika medycznego, Warsaw: PZWL 2011.
- Hörverstehen. Podręcznik do nauki rozumienia ze słuchu + CD, Warsaw: Poltext 2010.
- Deutsch für Krankenpflege und Hebammenkunde + CD, Warsaw: PZWL 2010.
- English for Business + CD, Warsaw: Poltext 2009.
- Prawo. Język niemiecki. Ćwiczenia i słownictwo specjalistyczne, Warsaw: Hueber Polska 2009.
- Jak pisać po niemiecku?, Warsaw: Langenscheidt 2008.
- Medycyna. [German-Polish, Polish-German medical pocket dictionary], Warsaw: Hueber Polska 2008.
- Medycyna. Język niemiecki. Ćwiczenia i słownictwo specjalistyczne, Warsaw: Hueber Polska 2007.
- Fachsprache Wirtschaft, Poznań: LektorKlett 2007.

=== Editorships (selected) ===
- Pandemia albo końcówka. Kulturowe świadectwa czasów zarazy, Gdańsk: Fundacja Terytoria Książki 2024 (co-editors: Małgorzata Grzegorzewska, Ireneusz Gielata).
- Fragmenty dyskursu żałobnego, Gdańsk: Fundacja Terytoria Książki 2021 (co-editors: Grzegorz Olszański, Monika Ładoń).
- Fragmenty dyskursu maladycznego, Gdańsk: Fundacja Terytoria Książki 2019 (co-editors: Ireneusz Gielata, Monika Ładoń).
- Jeszcze raz o starości z chorobą. On Ageing and Illness, One More Time, Kraków: Homini 2019 (co-editor: Hanna Serkowska).
- Medycyna w teatrze [Medicine on Stage], Kraków: Homini 2017 (co-editor: Krzysztof Rutkowski).
- Medycyna w filmie [Medicine on Screen], Kraków: Homini 2017 (co-editor: Michał Oleszczyk).
- Max Frisch: Dramaty zebrane, Volume I and II, Warsaw: ADiT 2016.
- Literatura piękna i medycyna [Belles Lettres and Medicine], Kraków: Homini 2015 (co-editor: Piotr Wilczek).
- Arthur Schnitzler: Dramaty wybrane. Volume I and II, Warsaw: ADiT 2014.
- Tłumacz i przekład – wyzwania współczesności, Katowice: ŚLĄSK 2013 (co-editor: Piotr Wilczek).
- Ödön von Horváth: Dramaty zebrane, Volume I and II, Warsaw: ADiT 2012.
- Rola tłumacza i przekładu w epoce wielokulturowości i globalizacji, Katowice: ŚLĄSK 2012 (co-editor: Piotr Wilczek).
- Deutsche Grammatik für alle, Warsaw: Poltext 2011.
- Współczesne sztuki uznanych autorów niemieckich. Zbliżenia. Antologia, Volume I, Warsaw: ADiT 2010.
- Współczesne sztuki młodych autorów niemieckich. Końce świata. Antologia, Volume II, Warsaw: ADiT 2010.

=== Articles (selected) ===
- Hermanna Brocha analiza faszyzmu. In: "Acta Universitatis Lodziensis. Folia Litteraria Polonica 41", no. 3/2018, p. [7]–26.
- W poszukiwaniu tożsamości – o dramatopisarstwie Maxa Frischa. In: M. Frisch, Dramaty zebrane, Volume I, Warsaw: ADiT 2017, p. 5–41.
- "Lekarki" Rolfa Hochhutha na tle jego oskarżycielskiej twórczości literackiej. In: Rolf Hochhuth: Lekarki, Warsaw: ADiT 2016, p. 5–10.
- Aspekty medyczne i rewolucyjne w dramacie Woyzeck Georga Büchnera. In: Literatura piękna i medycyna, Kraków: Homini 2015, p. 121–140.
- Diagnozy wiedeńskiego lekarza albo dramaturgia Arthura Schnitzlera. In: Arthur Schnitzler: Dramaty wybrane, Volume I, Warsaw: ADiT 2014, p. 5–33.
- "Przeciw głupocie i kłamstwu", czyli dramaturgia Ödöna von Horvátha. In: Ödön von Horváth: Dramaty zebrane, Volume I, Warsaw: ADiT 2012, p. 5–20.
- W kręgu samotności, czyli kilka słów o dramaturgii austriackiej. In: Antologia nowych sztuk austriackich autorów, Warsaw: ADiT 2012, p. 5–16.
- O Wolfie Wondratschku i jego Strażaku. In: "RED" 2/12 2010, p. 41–43.
- Literatura austriacka w dobie faszyzmu. In: "Philology issue 1, Zeszyty Naukowe" 23/2009, p. 23–35.
- O Hermanie Brochu i Mowie pożegnalnej Hitlera. In: "Odra" 5/2008, p. 36–38.
- "Ich finde um zu erfinden." Peter Härtling im Gespräch mit Maciej Ganczar. In: "Studia niemcoznawcze", Vol. XXXVII. Warsaw 2008, p. 305–308.
- Eine Studie über die Identität des Künstlers Wilhelm Waiblinger im Roman "Waiblingers Augen" von Peter Härtling. In: W dialogu języków i kultur. Warsaw 2007, p. 313–322.
- Peter Härtlings Künstlerbiographie "Schumanns Schatten" – das Dokumentarische und das Fiktionale. In: "Studia niemcoznawcze", Vol. XXXII. Warsaw 2006, p. 527–538.
- Der Künstler E.T.A. Hoffmann im Roman "Hoffmann oder Die vielfältige Liebe" von Peter Härtling. Vom Verarbeiten des Biographischen im literarischen Werk. In: "Studia niemcoznawcze", Vol. XXXI, Warsaw 2005, p. 529–538.

=== Literary translations (selected) ===
- Frisch Max, Andora. Sztuka w dwunastu obrazach. In: Max Frisch, Dramaty zebrane. Volume II, Warsaw: ADiT 2017, p. 189–273.
- Frisch Max, Rip van Winkle. Słuchowisko. In: Max Frisch, Dramaty zebrane. Volume I, Warsaw: ADiT 2017, p. 377–428.
- Frisch Max, Santa Cruz. In: Max Frisch, Dramaty zebrane. Volume I, Warsaw: ADiT 2017, p. 43–108.
- Hochhuth Rolf: Lekarki, Warsaw: ADiT 2016.
- Schnitzler Arthur: Partnerka. In: Arthur Schnitzler: Dramaty wybrane. Volume I, Warsaw: ADiT 2014, p. 417–434.
- Schnitzler Arthur: Literatura. In: Arthur Schnitzler: Dramaty wybrane. Volume I, Warsaw: ADiT 2014, p. 489–517.
- Schnitzler Arthur: Lalkarz. In: Arthur Schnitzler: Dramaty wybrane. Volume I, Warsaw: ADiT 2014, p. 601–620.
- Schnitzler Arthur: Mężny Kasjan. In: Arthur Schnitzler: Dramaty wybrane. Volume I, Warsaw: ADiT 2014, p. 621–639.
- Schnitzler Arthur: Rozmowa młodego krytyka ze starym. In: Arthur Schnitzler: Dramaty wybrane. Volume II, Warsaw: ADiT 2014, p. 7–13.
- Schnitzler Arthur: Intermezzo. In: Arthur Schnitzler: Dramaty wybrane. Volume II, Warsaw: ADiT 2014, p. 15–88.
- Schnitzler Arthur: Hrabianka Mizzi albo dzień z rodziną. In: Arthur Schnitzler: Dramaty wybrane. Volume II, Warsaw: ADiT 2014, p. 89–122.
- Schnitzler Arthur: Godzina prawdy. In: Arthur Schnitzler: Dramaty wybrane. Volume II, Warsaw: ADiT 2014, p. 369–398.
- Schnitzler Arthur: Wielka scena. In: Arthur Schnitzler: Dramaty wybrane. Volume II, Warsaw: ADiT 2014, p. 399–440.
- Schnitzler Arthur: Święto Bachusa. In: Arthur Schnitzler: Dramaty wybrane. Volume II, Warsaw: ADiT 2014, p. 441–468.
- Horváth Ödön von: Pod pięknym widokiem. In: Ödön von Horváth: Dramaty zebrane. Volume I, Warsaw: ADiT 2012, p. 23–90.
- Horváth Ödön von: Głową w mur. In: Ödön von Horváth: Dramaty zebrane. Volume I, Warsaw: ADiT 2012, p. 415–486.
- Horváth Ödön von: Wieś bez mężczyzn. In: Ödön von Horváth: Dramaty zebrane. Volume II, Warsaw: ADiT 2012, p. 257–330.
- Genazino Wilhelm: Dobry Boże, spraw, żebym oślepł. Dramaty, Warsaw: ADiT 2011. [Polish premiere: 03.11.2012, Polish Radio Programme II, directed by Maciej Wojtyszko]
- Broch Hermann: Rozgrzeszenie. Z powietrza wzięte. Dramaty, Warsaw: ADiT 2010.
- Becker Marc: Końce świata. ADiT, [Polish premiere: 16.03.2012, HOTELOKO Theatre, directed by Karolina Kirsz].
- Becker Marc: My w finale. ADiT.
- Wondratschek Wolf: Strażak. In: "RED" 2/12 2010, p. 44–49.
- Broch Hermann: Ostatni wybuch manii wielkości. Mowa pożegnalna Hitlera. In: "Odra" 5/2008, p. 39–44.
