= Jan Ciechanowski =

Polish diplomat (1887–1973)

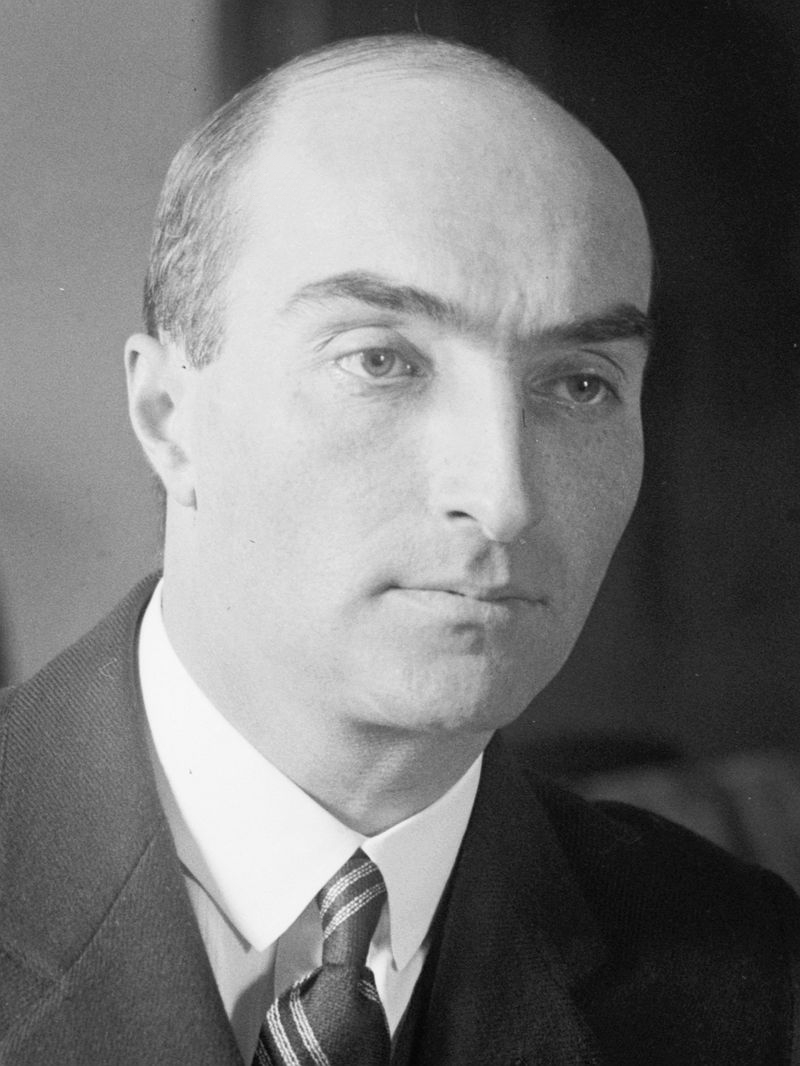
- Jan Ciechanowski in 1925

Ambassador of Poland to the United States
- In office 16 December 1940 – 5 July 1945
- Preceded by: Jerzy Potocki
- Succeeded by: Janusz Żółtowski (chargé d’affaires); Oskar R. Lange (ambassador)

Envoy of Poland to the United States
- In office 12 October 1925 – 20 February 1929
- Preceded by: Władysław Wróblewski
- Succeeded by: Tytus Filipowicz

Personal details
- Born: Jan Maria Włodzimierz Ciechanowski; 15 May 1887 Grodziec, Congress Poland, Russian Empire (now part of Będzin, Poland)
- Died: 16 April 1973 (aged 85) Washington, D.C., United States
- Party: League of Polish Independence
- Parents: Stanisław Ciechanowski; Maria Garbińska
- Occupation: economist; diplomat

Jan Maria Włodzimierz Ciechanowski (Note: Polish pronunciation: [ˈjan ˈma.rja vwɔˈd͡ʑi.mjɛʂ t͡ɕɛ.xaˈnɔf.ski]) (15 May 1887 – 16 April 1973) was a Polish economist and diplomat. He was the envoy of Poland to the United States from 1925 to 1929, and later the ambassador of Poland (Polish government-in-exile) to the United States from 1940 to 1945. From 1939 to 1940 he was the secretary-general of the Ministry of Foreign Affairs of Poland.

== Biography ==
Jan Maria Włodzimierz Ciechanowski was born on 15 May 1887 in Grodziec, Congress Poland, Russian Empire (now part of Będzin, Poland). He was a son of Stanisław Ciechanowski (1845–1927) and Maria Garbińska (1863–1953), and an older brother of Stanisław Ciechanowski (1913–1992). He came from the minor noble family of Ciechanowski, which was of Jewish descent. His father was a businessperson, and owner of several mines and factories in Grodziec. From 1911 to 1917, Jan Ciechanowski was the administration manager of his father's operations.

From 1919 to 1925 he was a legation counselor at the embassy of Poland in London, England. From 12 October 1925 to 20 February 1929, he was the envoy of Poland to the United States. In 1928, he and Frank B. Kellogg, United States Secretary of State signed treaties of conciliation and international arbitration between Poland and the United States.

From 1939 to 1940, during the Second World War he was the secretary-general of the Ministry of Foreign Affairs of Poland. From 16 December 1940 to 5 July 1945 he was the ambassador of Poland (Polish government-in-exile) to the United States. On 1 January 1942, he signed the Declaration by United Nations as the representative of Poland. From 1 November to 7 December 1944, he led a Polish delegation to the convention of the International Civil Aviation Organization held in Chicago, Illinois, United States, which led to the signing of the Convention on International Civil Aviation on 7 December 1944.

Following the end of the Second World War and end of his service as the ambassador, he decided to stay permanently in the United States. He became a member of the League of Polish Independence, a political party and organization formed in 1944, which advocated for the independence of Poland from outside powers, mainly the Soviet Union.

Ciechanowski died on 16 April 1973 in Washington, D.C., United States.

== Works ==
- 1947: Defeat in Victory (Garden City, New York: Doubleday & Co.)

== Awards and decorations ==
- Commander's Cross of the Order of Polonia Restituta
