= Tytus Filipowicz =

Polish politician and diplomat (1873–1953)

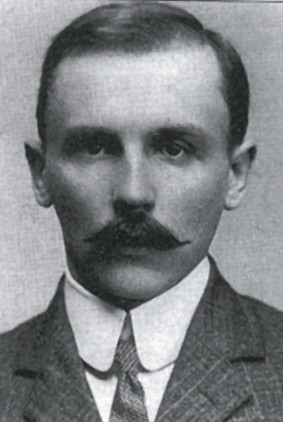
- Filipowicz before 1921

Minister of Foreign Affairs
- In office November 16, 1918 – November 17, 1918
- Preceded by: Władysław Wróblewski
- Succeeded by: Leon Wasilewski

Polish Chargé d'Affaires to RFSFR
- In office July 1, 1921 – October 22, 1921
- Preceded by: Office established
- Succeeded by: Zygmunt Stefanski

Polish ambassador to Finland
- In office October 27, 1922 – September 6, 1927
- Preceded by: Michał Sokolnicki
- Succeeded by: Tomasz Sariusz-Bielski

Polish ambassador to Belgium
- In office September 6, 1927 – February 1, 1929
- Preceded by: Anatol Mühlstein
- Succeeded by: Tomasz Sariusz-Bielski

Polish ambassador to the U.S.
- In office March 1, 1929 – December 17. 1932
- Preceded by: Jan Ciechanowski
- Succeeded by: Władysław Sokołowski

Personal details
- Born: November 21, 1873 Warsaw, Congress Poland
- Died: June 13, 1953 (aged 79) London, United Kingdom

Tytus Filipowicz (1873–1953) was a Polish politician and diplomat.

== Life ==
Filipowicz was born on 21 November 1873 in Warsaw. He attended school in Dąbrowa Górnicza. He worked as a coal miner and became a socialist political activist; from 1895 he was active in the Dąbrowa Workers' Committee. He became an active member of the Polish Socialist Party (PPS) and editor of a socialist paper for miners (Górnik, Miner). In 1901 he was arrested by the authorities but escaped to Russian-ruled Warsaw.

During the PPS split, he sided with the Polish Socialist Party – Revolutionary Faction and became a close collaborator of future Polish statesman Józef Piłsudski. He accompanied Piłsudski on his 1904 voyage to Japan. In 1905 Filipowicz was imprisoned by the Russian Empire in the Warsaw Citadel, but escaped.

Under the Second Polish Republic, he was briefly deputy or acting (sources vary) Polish Minister of Foreign Affairs (11–17 November 1918). Later he was named Poland's ambassador to Georgia—due to his involvement in Piłsudski's Prometheist project—but in the aftermath of the Soviet invasion of Georgia (which was subsequently annexed as the Georgian Soviet Socialist Republic) he did not assume this post but was instead arrested there by the Soviets and interned. After the treaty of Riga ended the Polish-Soviet War in 1921, he became the first Polish chargé d'affaires in the Soviet Union, organizing the Polish embassy there. Later he was a diplomat in Finland, Belgium and the United States (1929-32).

In 1934, with Gabriel Czechowicz, Filipowicz co-founded the Polish Radical Party (Polska Partia Radykalna), a dissident offshoot of Sanation that, while largely adhering to political liberalism, advocated that Poland become a Christian state, with official preferences given to ethnic Poles, and Jews being encouraged to emigrate.

During and after World War II, Filipowicz was a member of the Polish Government in Exile and of the National Council of the Republic of Poland (1941–42 and 1949–53).

He died on 18 August 1953 in London.

== See also ==
- Prometheism
- List of Poles
