= Piotr Wilczek =

Polish historian, literary translator, and diplomat

Professor Piotr Wilczek
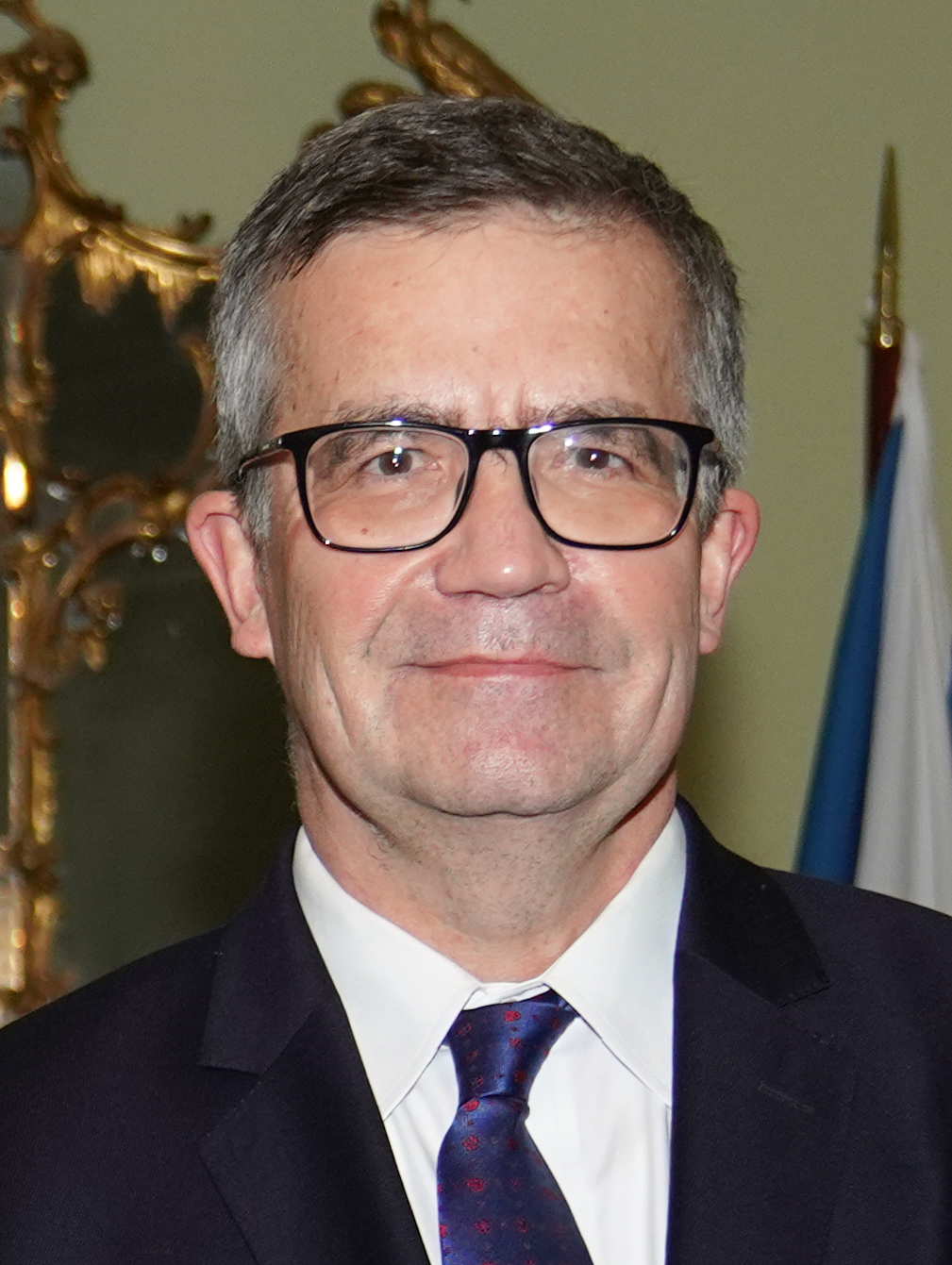
- Piotr Wilczek (2024)

Poland Ambassador to the United Kingdom
- In office 15 February 2022 – October 2025
- Appointed by: Andrzej Duda
- Monarch: Elizabeth II; Charles III
- Preceded by: Arkady Rzegocki

Poland Ambassador to the United States
- In office 9 November 2016 – 31 October 2021
- Appointed by: Andrzej Duda
- President: Barack Obama; Donald Trump; Joe Biden
- Preceded by: Ryszard Schnepf
- Succeeded by: Marek Magierowski

Personal details
- Born: 26 April 1962 (age 64) Chorzów, Poland
- Education: University of Silesia in Katowice
- Profession: Diplomat, scientist, historian
- Website: http://www.al.uw.edu.pl/kadra/wilczek-piotr/

Piotr Antoni Wilczek (born 26 April 1962, Chorzów) is a Polish intellectual historian, a specialist in comparative literature and a literary translator. He served as the Ambassador of Poland to the United States (2016–2021) and the United Kingdom (2022-2025).

== Academic career ==
Piotr Wilczek graduated from the University of Silesia in Katowice, Poland (1986) where he received his Ph.D. (1992) and Habilitation (2001) degrees. In 2006 he was nominated professor of the humanities by the President of the Republic of Poland. Doctor of Humane Letters (honoris causa) of Cleveland State University.

He was an assistant and associate professor at the University of Silesia (1986–2008), where he also served as Dean of the Faculty of Languages (2002–2008). Since 2008 he has been a tenured full professor at the Faculty of „Artes Liberales", University of Warsaw and until 2016 served there as Head of the Collegium Artes Liberales (College of Liberal Arts and Sciences) and Head of the Centre for the Study of the Reformation and Intellectual Culture in Early Modern Europe.

He did his postgraduate work in intellectual history and Neo-Latin Studies at the Universities of Oxford (St Anne's College, 1988) and Łódź, Poland (1989). He was a visiting translator at The British Centre for Literary Translation, University of East Anglia (1994, 1996). Between 1998 and 2001 he was a visiting professor at Rice University, the University of Illinois at Chicago and the University of Chicago and gave invited public lectures at Harvard and the University of Texas at Austin. He was also a visiting scholar at Boston College and Cleveland State University.

He has been a board member of numerous international scholarly journals (e.g. “Reformation and Renaissance Review”, “The Sarmatian Review”), book series (at Springer-Verlag GmbH and Walter de Gruyter GmbH) and academic initiatives (including the Reformation Research Consortium (RefoRC) and the Post-Reformation Digital Library), and a member of several professional organizations (e.g. Modern Language Association of America, the Polish Literary Translators' Association). Since 2014 Representative in Poland of the Kosciuszko Foundation, Inc. (New York) and President of the Management Board of the Kosciuszko Foundation Poland. Member of the American Study Group at the Polish Institute of International Affairs.

== Diplomatic career ==
Starting 9 November 2016, Wilczek served as the Ambassador of Poland to the United States, succeeding Ryszard Schnepf. He ended his term on 31 October 2021. On 22 December 2021 he was nominated ambassador to the United Kingdom. He started his term on 15 February 2022. He stepped down from his role of ambassador on health grounds in October 2025.

== Honours ==
- Knight's Cross of the Order of Polonia Restituta (2022)

== Books ==
=== Books in English (authored and edited) ===
- Polonia Reformata. Essays on the Polish Reformation(s). Vandenhoeck & Ruprecht, Göttingen 2016.
- Collegium / College / Kolegium. College and the Academic Community in the European and the American Tradition. Edited by Mark O'Connor and Piotr Wilczek. Wydawnictwo Sub Lupa: Boston – Warsaw, 2011.
- (Mis)translation and (Mis)interpretation: Polish Literature in the Context of Cross-Cultural Communication. Peter Lang: Frankfurt am Main, 2005.
- Treny: The Laments of Kochanowski. Translated by Adam Czerniawski. Foreword by Donald Davie. Edited and annotated by Piotr Wilczek. Legenda: Oxford, 2001.

=== Books in Polish (authored and edited) ===
- Literatura piękna i medycyna. Homini, Kraków 2015 (co-editor: Maciej Ganczar).
- Tłumacz i przekład – wyzwania współczesności, Katowice: ŚLĄSK 2013 (co-editor: Maciej Ganczar).
- Rola tłumacza i przekładu w epoce wielokulturowości i globalizacji. ŚLĄSK, Katowice 2012 (co-editor: Maciej Ganczar).
- Wiesław Mincer, Jan Kalwin w Polsce. Bibliografia. Edited by Piotr Wilczek. Sub Lupa: Warszawa 2012.
- Angielsko-polskie związki literackie. Szkice o przekładzie artystycznym. Wydawnictwo Naukowe "Śląsk": Katowice, 2011.
- Jan Kochanowski. Wydawnictwo Nomen Omen: Katowice, 2011 (e-book).
- Reformacja w Polsce i Europie Środkowo-Wschodniej. Postulaty badawcze. Edited by Piotr Wilczek. Assistant Editors: Michał Choptiany, Jakub Koryl, Alan Ross. Wydawnictwo Sub Lupa: Warszawa, 2010.
- Retoryka. Edited by Piotr Wilczek, Maria Barłowska, Agnieszka Budzyńska-Daca. Wydawnictwo Naukowe PWN: Warszawa, 2008.
- Polonice et Latine. Studia o literaturze staropolskiej. Wydawnictwo Uniwersytetu Śląskiego: Katowice, 2007.
- Literatura polskiego renesansu. Wydawnictwo Uniwersytetu Śląskiego: Katowice, 2005.
- Dyskurs – przekład – interpretacja: literatura staropolska i jej trwanie we współczesnej kulturze. Gnome: Katowice, 2001.
- Poezja polskiego renesansu. Interpretacje. Książnica: Katowice, 2000 (co-author: Kazimierz Martyn).
- Erazm Otwinowski, Pisma poetyckie. Edited by Piotr Wilczek. IBL PAN: Warszawa, 1999.
- Szkolny słownik literatury staropolskiej. Videograf II: Katowice, 1999 (co-authors: Janusz K. Goliński, Roman Mazurkiewicz).
- Ślady egzystencji. Szkice o polskich pisarzach emigracyjnych. Wydawnictwo Naukowe „Śląsk”: Katowice, 1997.
- Jan Kochanowski, Treny. Translated by Adam Czerniawski. Foreword Donald Davie. Edited and annotated by Piotr Wilczek. Wydawnictwo Uniwersytetu Śląskiego: Katowice, 1996.
- Erazm Otwinowski – pisarz ariański. Gnome: Katowice, 1994.
- Spory o Biblię w literaturze Renesansu i Reformacji. Schumacher: Kielce 1995.

=== Translations from English into Polish ===
- Aleksander Topolski: Biez wodki. Moje wojenne przeżycia w Rosji [Without Vodka. Adventures in Wartime Russia]. REBIS: Poznań, 2011.
- Thomas M. Gannon, George W. Traub, Pustynia i miasto [The Desert and the city. An Interpretation of the History of Christian Spirituality]. WAM: Kraków, 1999.
- John Berendt, Północ w ogrodzie dobra i zła. Opowieść o Savannah [Midnight in the Garden of Good and Evil. A Savannah Story]. Prószyński i S-ka: Warszawa, 1998.
- John J. O'Donnell, Tajemnica Trójcy Świętej [The Mystery of the Triune God]. WAM: Kraków, 1993.
- Carlos G. Valles, Szkice o Bogu [Sketches of God]. WAM: Kraków, 1994.
- Michael Paul Gallagher, Możesz wierzyć. Dziesięć etapów na drodze do wiary [Free to Believe. Ten Steps to Faith]. WAM: Kraków, 1995.

== Sources ==
- Piotr Wilczek – "Scientists" – database of OPI (Information Processing Centre)
