= Romuald Spasowski =

Polish diplomat (1921–1995)

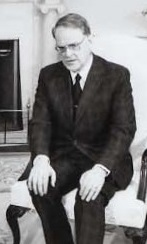
- Spasowski in December 1981

Personal details
- Born: Francis Romuald Spasowski; August 20, 1921 Warsaw, Republic of Poland
- Died: August 9, 1995 (aged 73) Oakton, Virginia, U.S.
- Resting place: Columbia Gardens Cemetery; Arlington County, Virginia, U.S.
- Spouse: Wanda Alina Sikorska
- Children: Maria Grochulska, Władysław Spasowski
- Occupation: diplomat

Francis Romuald Spasowski (August 20, 1921 – August 9, 1995), once an ardent Communist and Poland's ambassador to the United States, is best known for having defected at the height of the Solidarity crisis in 1981.

== Early life and education ==
Spasowski was born in Warsaw, Poland, on August 20, 1921. His father, Władysław, was a university professor and leading intellectual. Although not a member of the Polish Communist party, Władysław Spasowski wrote The Liberation of Man, a communist theoretical work, and raised Romuald to believe in Marxism long before it was fashionable in some Polish intellectual circles. Romuald studied and then taught at the College of Mechanics until Poland's invasion by Germany in 1939, then by Soviets in 1942.

The Spasowski family was active in the Polish resistance during World War II. Spasowski and his father were arrested several times by the German occupying Poland police Gestapo. His father committed suicide in 1941 after being tortured by the Nazis. Spasowski hid in his mother's home in Milanówek for a time, where the family harbored several Jewish families. In 1942, he fled to the Soviet Union.

== Career ==
Spasowski served as an officer in the Polish Army division formed in the Soviet Union under General Zygmunt Berling. Intensely loyal to Poland and convinced that Communism held great promise for his homeland, he joined the Polish United Workers' Party, the official Communist party in Poland, and entered government service almost immediately after the war. In time, Spasowski served on the Central Auditing Commission, which maintained and audited the party's finances.

Spasowski was appointed a member of the Polish War Crimes Mission at the Nuremberg trials.

Fluent in both English and Spanish, Spasowski served at the embassy in London from 1951 to 1953 and then two years as ambassador to Argentina.

Spasowski's first tour as Polish ambassador to the United States lasted from 1955 to 1961. He was the youngest member of the ambassadorial corps at the time. He kept a low profile during the Cold War with the exception his annual appearances at observances marking the anniversary of the Warsaw Ghetto Uprising of 1943. His and his family's commitment to religious tolerance led him to denounce Polish anti-Semitism during these occasions. In a speech in 1958, Spasowski said, 'I will not say to you here that in Poland anti-Semitism has been eliminated.'

In 1964, Spasowski represented Poland as a member of the International Commission for Supervision and Control in Vietnam, which was established to mediate peace between Hanoi and Saigon during the Vietnam War. From 1967 till 1971 Spasowski served as Poland's ambassador to India.

In the mid-1970s, Spasowski was named Deputy Foreign Minister in the Polish Foreign Ministry. In the mid-1970s, he also served as the Chief of the Polish Military Mission in West Berlin.

=== Second U.S. ambassadorial tour and defection ===
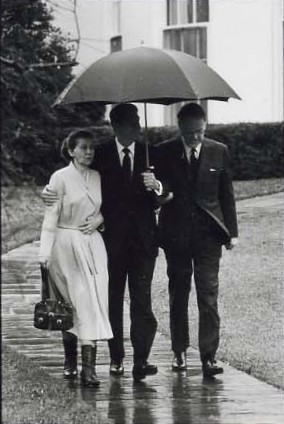
The Spasowskis visited with Ronald Reagan at the White House shortly after their defection

Spasowski returned to the United States for a second tour as ambassador in 1978.

Spasowski's wife had been a practicing Catholic for many years. The former Wanda Alina Sikorska was a cousin of Poland's former prime minister, General Władysław Sikorski. Wanda Spasowska's influence and religious views helped undermine her husband's belief in Communism. For years, Spasowski's faith in the Polish Communist regime had been wavering, but the ascension of a Pole to the papacy in 1978 provided the impetus for a clear break. The day Karol Cardinal Wojtyła became Pope John Paul II, Spasowski attended a special Mass at St. Matthew's Cathedral in Washington, D.C., taking a place of honor in the first pew. It marked the beginning of an increasingly contentious relationship with the Polish Foreign Ministry.

The formation of Solidarity in September 1980 deeply moved Spasowski. He is said to have privately voiced support for Solidarity's leader, Lech Wałęsa, and the labor movement's goals. Spasowski's daughter and son-in-law, supporters of Solidarity, fled to the United States early in 1981 and received asylum.

In October 1981, the Polish government ordered Spasowski home. He protested, and the recall order was rescinded.

On December 13, 1981, Polish government leader General Wojciech Jaruzelski started a crack-down on Solidarity, declaring martial law.

On the afternoon of December 19, 1981, Spasowski telephoned the U.S. State Department to announce that he was defecting and requesting asylum. The next day he told a worldwide radio audience that he had defected to show support for Solidarity and Lech Wałęsa. "The cruel night of darkness and silence was spread over my country," he said.

The Polish government confiscated his family's property, branded him a traitor and condemned him to death in absentia.

== Later years ==
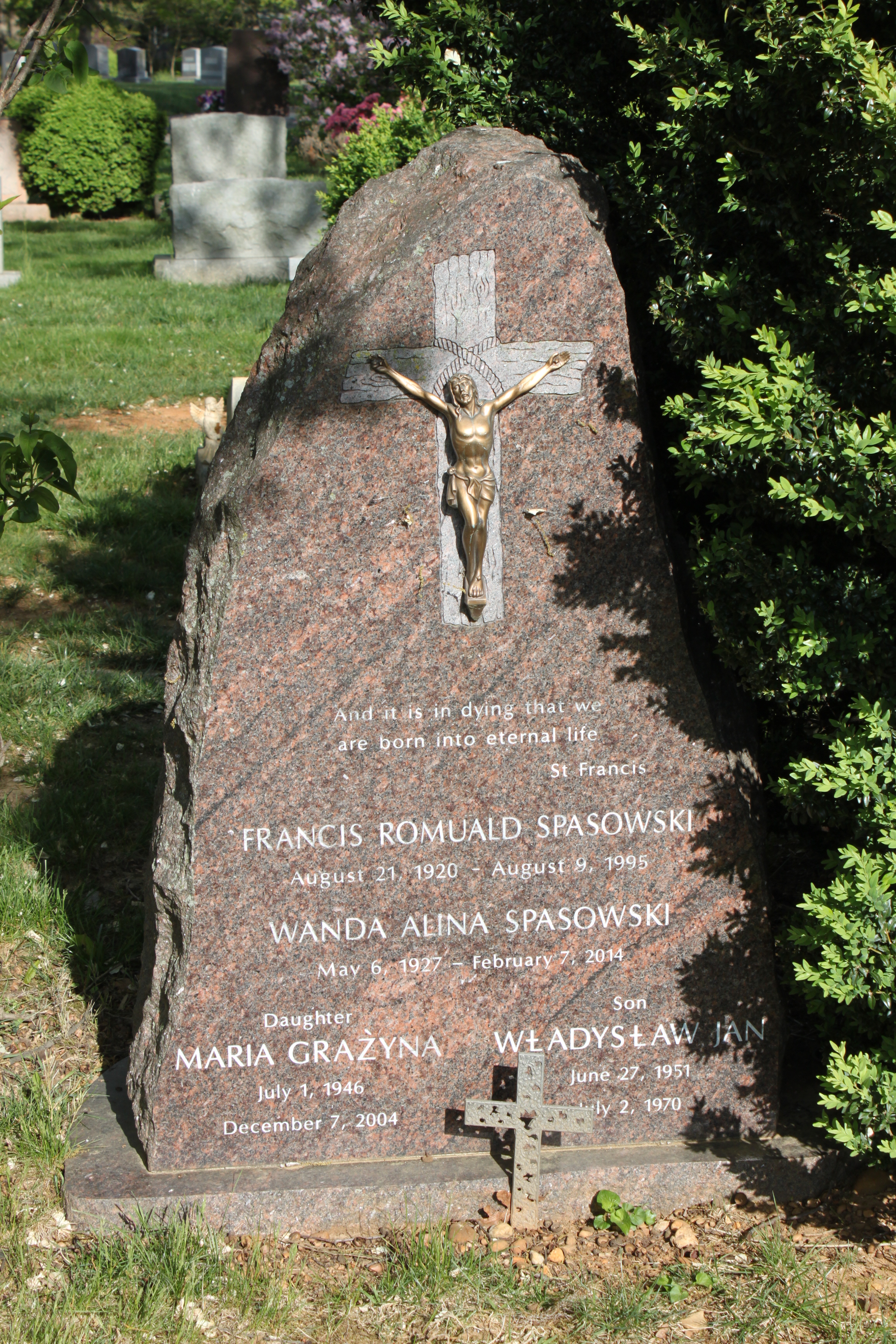
Grave of Spasowski and his family at Columbia Gardens Cemetery

Spasowski toured the United States throughout the 1980s, denouncing the Communist regime in Poland and playing a leading role in the U.S. Information Agency's anti-Communist television program, 'Let Poland Be Poland'.

In 1985, Spasowski, who was of a Calvinist family, was baptized a Catholic by Archbishop John Krol of Philadelphia.

In 1986, Spasowski published his autobiography, The Liberation of One, and eventually became an American citizen.

After the overthrow of Communist rule in Poland in 1989, Spasowski's death sentence was revoked.

In 1993, Polish President Lech Wałęsa restored Spasowski's Polish citizenship.

== Death ==
Spasowski died at his home in Oakton, Virginia, on August 9, 1995. The cause of death was cancer. Spasowski was survived by his wife, Wanda, and a daughter, Maria Grochulska, of Warsaw. His son, Władysław, died in India in 1970.

== Honours ==
- Gold Cross of Merit (1947)
- Medal of the 10th Anniversary of People's Poland (1955)
- Officer's Cross of the Order of Polonia Restituta (1955)

== See also ==
- List of Eastern Bloc defectors

== Sources ==
- Greenhouse, Linda (1981-12-21). "Man in the News: Disenchanted Diplomat". New York Times.
- Binder, David (1995-08-12). "Romuald Spasowski, 74, Dies; Polish Envoy Defected to U.S.". New York Times.
