= Ryszard Schnepf =

Polish politician and diplomat

Ryszard Schnepf Ph.D.
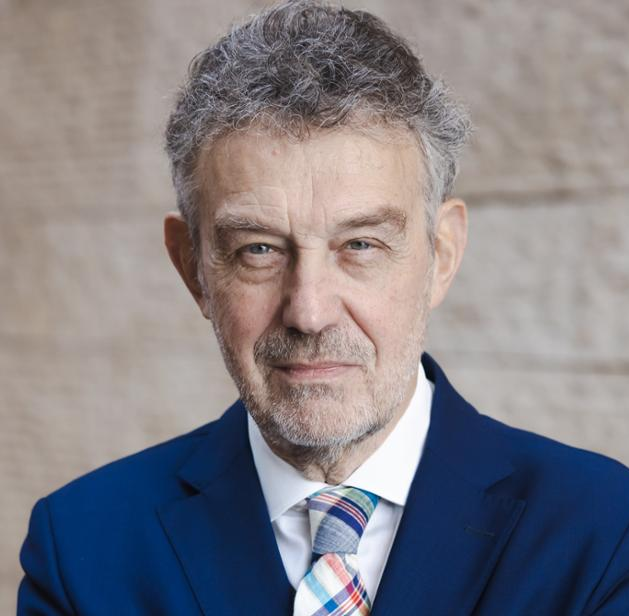
- Schnepf in 2025

Poland Ambassador to Uruguay
- In office 1991–1996
- Preceded by: Konstanty Rozwadowski
- Succeeded by: Jarosław Gugała

Poland Ambassador to Costa Rica
- In office 2001–2005
- Preceded by: Mieczysław Biernacki
- Succeeded by: Andrzej Braiter

Poland Ambassador to Spain
- In office 2008–2012
- Preceded by: Grażyna Bernatowicz
- Succeeded by: Tomasz Arabski

Poland Ambassador to the United States
- In office 2012–2016
- Preceded by: Robert Kupiecki
- Succeeded by: Piotr Wilczek

Personal details
- Born: 22 September 1951 (age 75) Warsaw, Poland
- Spouse: Dorota Wysocka-Schnepf
- Children: Zuzanna Schnepf-Kołacz
- Parent(s): Alicja Szczepaniak-Schnepf; Maksymilian Schnepf
- Education: University of Warsaw
- Profession: Diplomat, lecturer

Ryszard Marian Schnepf (born 22 September 1951) is a Polish politician and diplomat.

== Early life ==
Schnepf was born in Warsaw, Poland on 22 September 1951, to Polish mother Alicja Szczepaniak-Schnepf (born 1930), recognized as Righteous Among The Nations, and father, colonel Maksymilian Schnepf (1920–2003), who, until 1968, was head of the communist military office (Studium Wojskowe) at the University of Warsaw.

Ryszard Schnepf graduated from history at the University of Warsaw. He defended doctoral thesis there.

== Career ==
Since 1978 he has been working as a lecturer at the University of Warsaw. In the early 1990s Schnepf joined the diplomatic service. Between 1991 and 1996 he served as Ambassador to Uruguay and Paraguay and between 2001 and 2005 to Costa Rica. From 2007 to late 2008 he served as the under-secretary of state of Poland, as part of the Foreign Ministry. From 2008 to 2012 he was ambassador to Spain.

On 14 January 2013, Ryszard Schnepf presented his credentials to U.S. President Barack Obama in a formal ceremony at the Oval Office, marking his official recognition as Ambassador of the Republic of Poland to the United States. He served as Poland's Ambassador until 31 July 2016. He was succeeded as Ambassador by Piotr Wilczek. On 26 August 2024, he took the post of Chargé d'affaires to Italy, accredited also to San Marino.

== Honours ==
- Grand Cross of the Order of Isabella the Catholic (Spain, 2012)
- Grand Cross of the National Order of Juan Mora Fernández (Costa Rica, 2004)
