= Jan Długosz University =

Public university in Częstochowa, Poland

Jan Dlugosz University in Czestochowa
- Uniwersytet Jana Długosza w Częstochowie
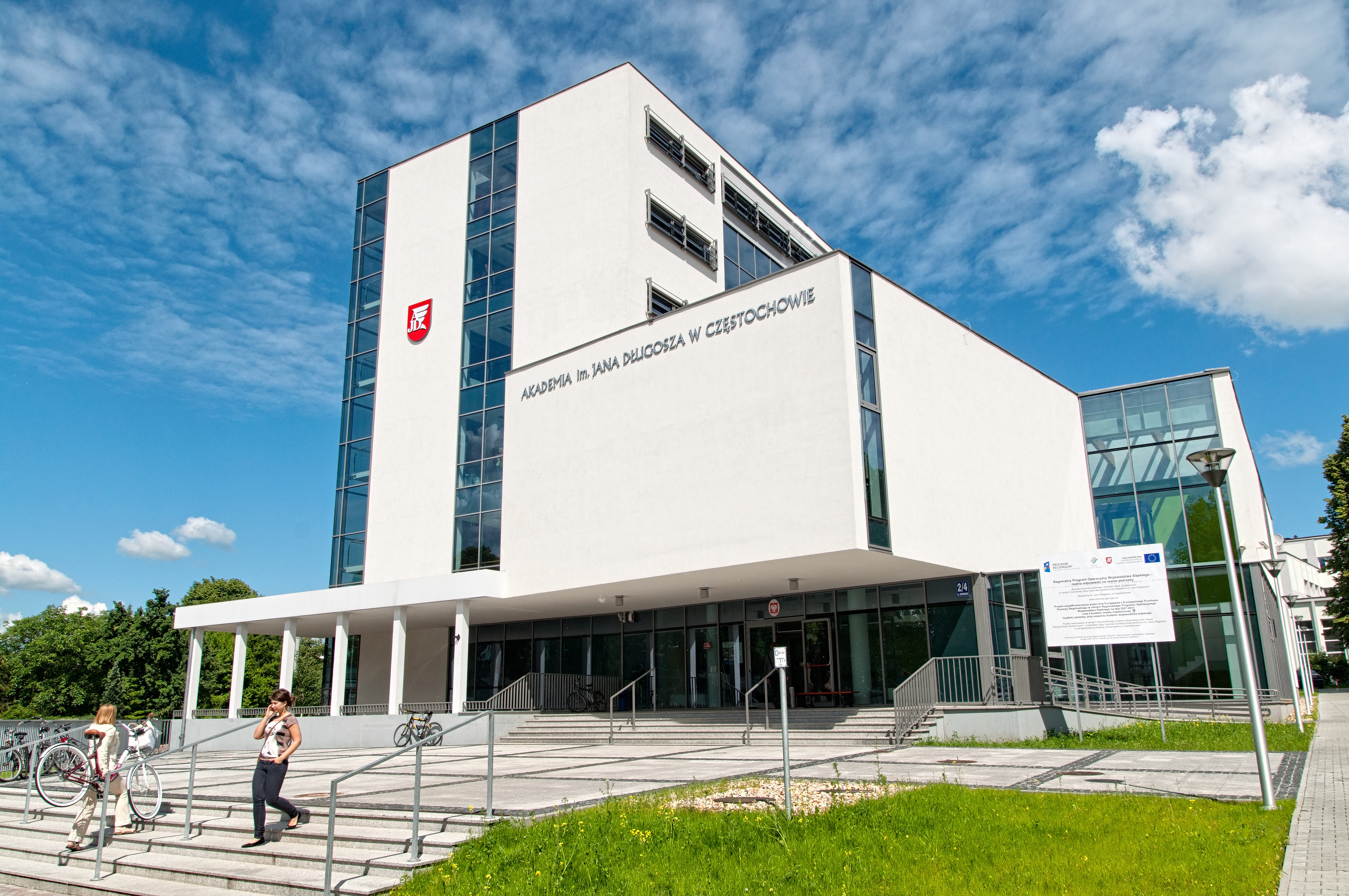
- Latin: Universitas Ioannis Dlugossii Czestochoviensis
- Type: Public teacher training college
- Established: 1971
- Rector: prof. dr hab. Janusz Kapuśniak
- Academic staff: c.a. 700
- Students: 5,631 (12.2023)
- Location: Częstochowa, Silesian, Poland; 50.810281°N 19.115851°E
- Website: link

Jan Długosz University in Czestochowa (JDU) is a Polish public university in Czestochowa, established in 1971 as the Higher Teacher Education School in Czestochowa. Since 2004, it has been named after Jan Długosz.

== History ==
The origins of the university date back to 1957, when in the former barracks at Dąbrowskiego St., the Teacher Training College was established offering two-year studies in mathematics, biology and economics of households and public nutrition. Next, philology and physics were launched. At the end of the 1960s, the school was moved to a new building at Armii Krajowej Av.

In 1971, by decision of the Council of Ministers, the Higher Teacher Education School in Czestochowa was established. Initially, there were two faculties: Faculty of Mathematics and Natural Sciences and Faculty of Humanities and Pedagogy. It employed 12 assistant professors and 10 Doctors of Philosophy.

In 1974, four-year Master's studies were launched at the Faculty of Mathematics and Natural Sciences, Faculty of Philology and History and Faculty of Artistic Education, and the name was changed to the Higher Pedagogical School in Czestochowa. The first Master's diplomas were issued by HPS authorities in 1977.

On January 29, 2001, the Central Commission for Degrees and Titles granted HPS the first right to award PhD degrees at the Faculty of Philology and History in the discipline of history. In the same year, the project of establishing the University of Czestochowa on the basis of the HPS and the Theological Institute did not pass in the parliamentary committee on education, science and youth. The reason for its rejection was the lack of qualified staff. A year later, the Ministry of National Education considered creating a university by merging HPS and Czestochowa University of Technology, but due to the lack of a clear declaration from CUT, the project was abandoned.

After numerous debates in the academic community, it was decided that the best candidate for the university's patron at the moment of transformation of HPS into JDA would be Jan Długosz. The figure of the chronicler is associated with the Czestochowa region, where he was born and later served as a priest. After presenting this proposal, on March 26, 2003, the HPS Senate decided to elect Jan Długosz as the patron of the university.

On October 1, 2004, the Higher Pedagogical School in Czestochowa was transformed into Jan Dlugosz Academy in Czestochowa. On March 1, 2016, there was a change in the structure of the University. The Faculty of Social Sciences merged with the Faculty of Philology and History. The new unit was called the Faculty of Philology and History. The JDA authorities explained this step by the need to create a strong faculty that will soon apply for the new right to award doctorate (PhD) qualifications.

The efforts to change the name of the Academy into a University were sealed on May 7, 2018 with the signing of the ordinance on changing the name of the university by the Minister of Science and Higher Education. On June 1, 2018, the university changed its name to Jan Dlugosz University of Humanities and Natural Sciences. On October 1, 2019, the structure of the University changed. Instead of 4 Faculties, 6 new units were created. Competences related to the education of persons seeking scientific degrees were taken over by the Doctoral School. An important step towards the development of the University was obtaining the consent to launch the programme in medicine (consent of the Minister of Education and Science of July 14, 2022), which resulted in the first enrollment of candidates for these studies for the academic year 2022/2023. Thus, the University joined the small group of Polish academic institutions which provide medical education.

As a result of the evaluation announced at the end of July 2022 (and then, as a result of the appeal - in February 2023), scientific disciplines received high categories:

- history - category A
- literary studies - category A
- chemical sciences - category A
- law - category A
- linguistics - category B+
- physical sciences - category B+
- physical culture science - category B+
- health sciences - category B+
- educational sciences - category B+
- music - category A
- fine arts and art conservation - category A
- philosophy - category B +
- security studies - category B +.

The high results obtained in the evaluation made it possible to change the name of the University to Jan Dlugosz University in Czestochowa on June 1, 2023.

== Basic statistics ==
The university has 5 faculties: Faculty of Humanities; Faculty of Science and Technology; Faculty of Social Sciences; Faculty of Law and Economics and Faculty of Art. The structure also includes Wladyslaw Bieganski Collegium Medicum (established on June 1, 2023 from the transformation from the Faculty of Health Sciences). The University employs nearly 750 people, including approximately 500 research and teaching staff, including 180 research and scientific staff with habilitation degrees (including nearly 60 full professors). The University educates approximately 5 500 students (full-time, part-time and postgraduate studies) in over 50 fields of studies and 34 postgraduate programmes.

This group is complemented by approximately 100 PhD students. In spring 2021, the University signed the membership declaration Magna Charta Universitatum 2020. In the summer of 2023, by decision of the European Executive Agency for Education and Culture in Brussels (EACEA), Jan Dlugosz University in Czestochowa obtained the status of the European University.

== Didactic program ==
The University offers nearly 60 fields of studies and several dozen postgraduate programmes. It has the right to issue diplomas of completion of first- and second-cycle studies.

The University offers education at the Doctoral School in the following disciplines: chemistry, philosophy, physics, history, linguistics, literary studies, educational sciences, music and fine arts and art conservation, as well as law, health sciences, security studies and physical culture science. The University has obtained the right to award habilitated doctor degrees (dr hab.) in the following disciplines: history, philosophy, literary studies, chemical sciences, law, linguistics, physical sciences, physical culture science, health sciences, security studies, educational sciences, music and fine arts and art conservation. It also offers several dozen different courses and trainings.

The University systematically introduces modern teaching methods in the form of online education, tutoring and linguistic education. As part of the implementation of the tutoring program, the University cooperates with the Institute of School Tutoring and is a co-implementer of the “Raising a Wise Person” project - the Faculty of Social Sciences (former Faculty of Pedagogy) evaluates the project.

There is a long-standing tradition of dual education in physics with the University of Le Mans in France, as well as in social work, specialization "Case Management" with the Hochschule der Bundesagentur für Arbeit in Mannheim, Germany. PhD students of the Faculty of Science and Technology can realize PhD programmes in the co-tutelle system under the supervision of two co-supervisors: a research employee of the Faculty of Science and Technology and an employee of an external university, receiving a double diploma, Polish and foreign.

== Faculties ==
=== Faculty of Humanities ===
Dean: Przemysław Sznurkowski

Structure:

- Institute of History
- Institute of Literary Studies
- Institute of Linguistics
- Department of Philosophy

Fields of study:

- Journalism and media cultures
- Polish & foreign philology
- philosophy
- history
- Iberian studies
- Philosophy (in English)
- Specialized English for Business

=== Faculty of Social Sciences ===
Dean: Daniel Kukla

Structure:

- Department of Research on Education
- Department of Pedagogy
- Department of Social Policy and Social Work and Tourism
- Department of Security Sciences
- Department of Psychology

Fields of study:

- Social analytics and creativity
- National security
- Pedagogy
- Intercultural pedagogy with mediation
- Pre-school and early school pedagogy
- Special pedagogy
- Political science
- Developmental counselling and psychological aid
- Social work
- Psychology
- Psycho-prophylaxis
- East European and Balkan studies
- Tourism and recreation
- Social services

=== Faculty of Law and Economics ===
Dean: Ewelina Żelasko-Makowska

Structure:

- Department of Economics and Finance
- Department of Administrative and Financial Law
- Department of Judicial Law
- Department of Constitutional and Comparative Law

Fields of study:

- Administration
- Economics
- Law
- Accounting and taxes

=== Faculty of Science and Technology ===
Dean: Marcin Sosnowski

Structure:

- Institute of Chemistry
- Department of Biochemistry, Biotechnology and Ecotoxicology
- Department of Dietetics and Food Research
- Department of Theoretical Physics
- Department of Experimental and Applied Physics
- Department of Mathematics and Computer Science
- Department of Photoinduced Phenomena
- Department of Contemporary Security Problems
- Department of Advanced Computational Methods

Fields of study:

- Biotechnology
- Chemistry
- Computer science
- Nutrition
- Pharmacy
- Physics
- Innovative technologies and modern materials
- Safety engineering
- Medical engineering
- Multimedia engineering
- Forensics and security systems
- Mathematics
- Food production and marketing
- Human nutrition and dietetics

=== Wladyslaw Bieganski Collegium Medicum ===
Dean: Sławomir Letkiewicz

Structure:

- Department of Health Sciences and Physiotherapy
- Department of Physical Culture Science
- Department of Kinesiology and Health Prevention
- Department of Medical Sciences
- Department of Cosmetology and Medical Biology
- Department of Nursing

Fields of study:

- Physiotherapy
- Medicine
- Cosmetology
- Nursing
- Emergency medical services
- Physical education

=== Faculty of Art ===
Dean: Katarzyna Winczek

Structure:

- Department of Painting
- Department of Graphics
- Department of Music

Fields of studies:

- Art education in musical art
- Art education in visual arts
- Photography and visual communication creation
- Graphics
- Painting
- Music in public space

== University-wide units ==
• Academic Sports Center

• JDU Library, whose collections consist of nearly 390,000 items

• JDU Publishing House

• Centre for Knowledge Transfer & Innovation in the Areas of Science & Art

• Centre for Lifelong Learning

• University Centre for Culture, Art and Science

• Distance Learning Centre

• Planetarium – built in 1990–2000, launched in 2007. It is equipped with a modern digital DIGISTAR III SP system

• University of the Third Age (over 600 listeners every year).

== National and international cooperation ==
Jan Dlugosz University in Czestochowa cooperates with universities and research centres from all over Poland in conducting joint scientific research as part of short- and long-term research internships or as part of ongoing scientific and research projects financed, for example, by the National Science Centre. The University units are members of scientific consortiums, which include academic centres from all over the country and industry representatives. Jan Dlugosz University in Czestochowa cooperates with approximately 170 research centres abroad under bilateral agreements and in connection with the implementation of the ERASMUS+ program. Bilateral agreements on scientific, educational and cultural cooperation have been concluded, among others: with the following units:

• University of Jan Evangelista in Ústí nad Labem (UJEP) (the Czech Republic)

• Palacky University (the Czech Republic)

• University of Ostrava (the Czech Republic)

• Université du Mans (France)

• Universidad de Almeria (Spain)

• Acharya Nagarjuna University (India)

• Ariel University (Israel)

• State University of Physical Education and Sport (Moldova)

• Hochschule der Bundesagentur für Arbeit (Germany)

• Universität Koblenz-Landau (Germany)

• Universität Osnabrück (Germany)

• European University Viadrina (Germany)

• Universidad Nacional Toribio Rodríguez de Mendoza de Amazonas (Peru)

• Faculty of Entrepreneurial Business and Management of the University "Union - Nikola Tesla" (Serbia)

• Catholic University in Ružomberok (Slovakia)

• University of Žilina (Slovakia)

• Wright State University (USA)

• Kansas State University (USA)

• Kharkiv National Medical University (Ukraine)

• Kherson State Pedagogical University (Ukraine)

• Bohdan Khmelnytsky National University of Cherkasy (Ukraine)

• Pavlo Tychyna Uman State Pedagogical University (Ukraine)

• Ivano-Frankivsk National Technical University of Oil and Gas (Ukraine)

• Taras Shevchenko National University of Kyiv (Ukraine)

• University of Education Management of NAPS of Ukraine (Ukraine)

• Ivan Franko National University of Lviv (Ukraine)

• Lesya Ukrainka Eastern European National University (Ukraine)

• Mukachevo State University (Ukraine)

• Rivne State Humanitarian University (Ukraine)

• Sumy State A. S. Makarenko Pedagogical University (Ukraine)

• Ternopil Volodymyr Hnatiuk National Pedagogical University (Ukraine)

• Mykola Lysenko Lviv National Music Academy (Ukraine)

== Current authorities ==
- Rector prof. dr hab. Janusz Kapuśniak;
- Vice-Rector for Cooperation & Internationalisation dr hab. inż. Marcin Sosnowski;
- Vice-Rector for Research dr hab. Bogusław Przywora;
- Vice-Rector for Vice-Rector for Organisation & Development dr hab. Barbara Kowalska;
- Vice-Rector for Education & Student Affairs dr hab. Jakub Jakubowski;
- Vice-Rector for Collegium Medicum dr hab. n. med., dr n. hum. Sławomir Letkiewicz.

== Rectors ==
Rectors of the Higher Teacher Education School, the Higher Pedagogical School, Jan Dlugosz Academy, Jan Dlugosz University of Humanities and Natural Sciences, Jan Dlugosz University in Czestochowa:

1. 1971-1977 doc. dr Marian Jakubowski, pedagogy

2. 1977-1980 prof. dr hab. Janusz Sztumski, pedagogy

3. 1980-1984 prof. dr hab. Włodzimierz Brzezin, accounting

4. 1984-1990 prof. dr hab. Edward Polanowski, history of literature

5. 1990-1996 prof. dr hab. Józef Świątek, physics

6. 1996-2002 prof. dr hab. Ryszard Szwed, history

7. 2002-2008 prof. dr hab. Janusz Berdowski, physics

8. 2008-2016 dr hab. Zygmunt Bąk, prof. UJD, physics

9. 2016-2024 prof. dr hab. Anna Wypych-Gawrońska, literary studies.

== Affiliations ==
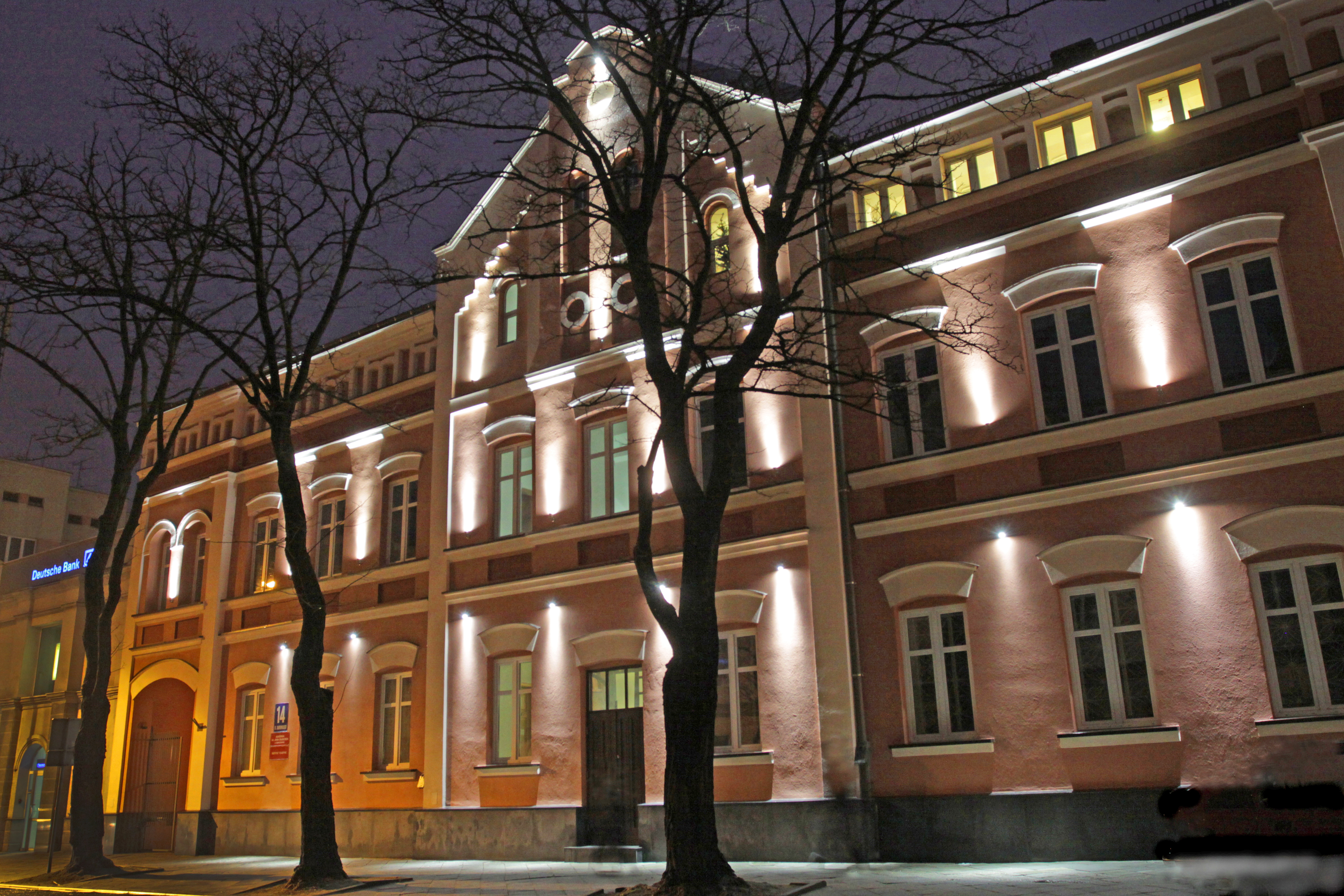
Faculty of Art Education

Lifelong Learning Program ERASMUS

The Jan Długosz University was a part of the Lifelong Learning Programme 2007–2013. The Jan Długosz University is a part of the European University Alliance COLOURS 2024-2028

== Doctors Honoris causa ==
- Henryk Samsonowicz,
- Jerzy Strzelczyk,
- Gerhard Fieguth,
- Marian Kisiel,
- Andrzej Jan Zakrzewski.

== Honorary professors of JDU ==
Jan Dlugosz University in Czestochowa awards the title of honorary professor to people who have made outstanding contributions to science or education. It is also awarded to people unrelated to science who have significantly contributed to the development of JDU and its good name; this title was awarded to:

- Prof. dr hab. Jurij Bielaiew – Kherson State University (Ukraine), 2007,
- Prof. dr hab. Ołeksandr Głuzman – Crimean State Humanitarian University in Jalta (Ukraine), 2007,
- Prof. dr hab. Ołeksandr Spiwakowski – Kherson State University (Ukraine), 2008,
- Prof. dr hab. Augustyn Bańka – (academic institutions: Poznan, Torun, Katowice, Krakow, Lublin, Czestochowa), 2009,
- Prof. Anna Claude-Gaumont – University of Caen (France), 2009,
- Prof. Abdelhadi Kassiba – Le Mans University (France), 2010,
- Prof. dr hab. Christian von Bar, Osnabrück University (Germany), 2011,
- Prof. dr hab. inż. Władysław Walkowiak, Wroclaw University of Science and Technology, 2012,
- Heinrich Alt, long-time member of the management board and labor market council of the Bundesagentur für Arbeit in Germany, 2013,
- Prof. dr hab. Janusz Sztumski, Jan Dlugosz Academy in Czestochowa 2013,
- Prof. dr hab. Evgen G. Sinkievicz, Kherson State University (Ukraine), 2013,
- Zygmunt Rolat, cultural activist, art patron, businessman, activist for Polish-Jewish dialogue, president of the World Association of Jews of Czestochowa and their Descendants, 2014,
- Prof. Charles Stirling, University of Sheffield, 2015,
- Prof. dr hab. inż. Janusz Rachoń – Gdańsk University of Technology, 2016,
- Prof. dr hab. inż. dr h.c. Zbigniew Florjańczyk – Warsaw University of Technology, 2016,
- Prof. Claudio Santi – University of Perugia, 2018.

== Notable alumni ==
- Andrzej Biernat – a Polish politician and a member of the Civic Platform party;
- Jakub Błaszczykowski – a Polish professional footballer;
- Maciej Ganczar – a Polish literary scholar specializing in German literature, literary translator;
- Wioletta Grzegorzewska – a Polish poet and writer;
- Tomasz Lubaszka – a Polish painter;
- Jacek Magiera – a Polish football manager and former footballer
- Radosław Panas – a Polish volleyball player;
- Andrzej Szewiński – a former professional volleyball player, sport activist and politician;
- Krzysztof Szramiak – a Polish weightlifter.

== Campuses and university buildings ==
Location of didactic and research centres in the centre of Czestochowa:

1. Rector’s Office, Faculty of Social Sciences, Faculty of Art, Wladyslaw Bieganski Collegium Medicum (4/8 Waszyngtona st.);

2. Faculty of Science and Technology; Wladyslaw Bieganski Collegium Medicum; Planetarium (13/15 Armii Krajowej av.);

3. Faculty of Humanities, University Library (36a Armii Krajowej av.);

4. Faculty of Law and Economics, Faculty of Art (2/4 Zbierskiego st.);

5. Faculty of Art (14 Dąbrowskiego st.);

6. Academic Sports Center (6 Zbierskiego st.);

7. “Skrzat” Student Home (76/78 Dąbrowskiego st.).

== Coat of arms ==
The author of the coat of arms is prof. Andrzej Desperak, employee of the Faculty of Art of the University. The senators made their choice during the JDA Senate meeting on May 30, 2018. The project was consulted with medievalist and heraldist dr. hab. Marceli Antoniewicz (employee of the Institute of History of the Faculty of Humanities of JDU).
